= 2001–02 Florida Panthers season =

National Hockey League team season

2001–02 Florida Panthers
- Division: 4th Southeast
- Conference: 14th Eastern
- 2001–02 record: 22–44–10–6
- Home record: 11–23–3–4
- Road record: 11–21–7–2
- Goals for: 180
- Goals against: 250

Team information
- General manager: Bill Torrey (Oct.–Dec.); Chuck Fletcher (Dec.–Apr.)
- Coach: Duane Sutter (Oct.–Dec.); Mike Keenan (Dec.–Apr.)
- Captain: Pavel Bure (Oct.–Dec.); Paul Laus (Oct.–Dec.); Vacant (Dec.–Apr.)
- Alternate captains: Sandis Ozolinsh (Jan.–Apr.); Robert Svehla
- Arena: National Car Rental Center
- Average attendance: 16,074
- Minor league affiliates: Utah Grizzlies; Florida Everblades

Team leaders
- Goals: Kristian Huselius (23)
- Assists: Pavel Bure (27)
- Points: Pavel Bure (49)
- Penalty minutes: Peter Worrell (354)
- Plus/minus: Darren Van Impe (+3)
- Wins: Roberto Luongo (16)
- Goals against average: Roberto Luongo (2.77)

The 2001–02 Florida Panthers season was their ninth season in the National Hockey League (NHL). The Panthers failed to qualify for the playoffs for the second consecutive season for the first time since the 1997–98 season and the 1998–99 season.

== Offseason ==
Prior to the beginning of the regular season it was announced that Pavel Bure and Paul Laus would alternate the captaincy every five games. This was discontinued when Mike Keenan was named the team’s new head coach in early December.

== Regular season ==
On December 3, it was announced that Mike Keenan would replace Duane Sutter as head coach and Bill Torrey would step down as general manager. Assistant general manager Chuck Fletcher was named interim general manager.

=== Final standings ===
Southeast Division
No.	CR		GP	W	L	T	OTL	GF	GA	Pts
1	3	**Carolina Hurricanes**	82	35	26	16	5	217	217	91
2	9	Washington Capitals	82	36	33	11	2	228	240	85
3	13	Tampa Bay Lightning	82	27	40	11	4	178	219	69
4	14	Florida Panthers	82	22	44	10	6	180	250	60
5	15	Atlanta Thrashers	82	19	47	11	5	187	288	54

Note: CR = Conference rank; GP = Games played; W = Wins; L = Losses; T = Ties; OTL = Overtime loss; GF = Goals for; GA = Goals against; Pts = Points
Bolded teams qualified for the playoffs.

Eastern Conference
R		Div	GP	W	L	T	OTL	GF	GA	Pts
**1**	**Z-** Boston Bruins	**NE**	**82**	**43**	**24**	**6**	**9**	**236**	**201**	101
**2**	**Y-** Philadelphia Flyers	**AT**	**82**	**42**	**27**	**10**	**3**	**234**	**192**	97
**3**	**Y-** Carolina Hurricanes	**SE**	**82**	**35**	**26**	**16**	**5**	**217**	**217**	91
**4**	**X-** Toronto Maple Leafs	**NE**	**82**	**43**	**25**	**10**	**4**	**249**	**207**	100
**5**	**X-** New York Islanders	**AT**	**82**	**42**	**28**	**8**	**4**	**239**	**220**	96
**6**	**X-** New Jersey Devils	**AT**	**82**	**41**	**28**	**9**	**4**	**205**	**187**	95
**7**	**X-** Ottawa Senators	**NE**	**82**	**39**	**27**	**9**	**7**	**243**	**208**	94
**8**	**X-** Montreal Canadiens	**NE**	**82**	**36**	**31**	**12**	**3**	**207**	**209**	87
8.5
9	Washington Capitals	SE	82	36	33	11	2	228	240	85
10	Buffalo Sabres	NE	82	35	35	11	1	213	200	82
11	New York Rangers	AT	82	36	38	4	4	227	258	80
12	Pittsburgh Penguins	AT	82	28	41	8	5	198	249	69
13	Tampa Bay Lightning	SE	82	27	40	11	4	178	219	69
14	Florida Panthers	SE	82	22	44	10	6	180	250	60
15	Atlanta Thrashers	SE	82	19	47	11	5	187	288	54

Divisions: AT – Atlantic, NE – Northeast, SE – Southeast

Z – Clinched conference; Y – Clinched division; X – Clinched playoff spot

== Schedule and results ==
2001–02 regular season
October: 3–7–2–1 (home: 1–3–0–1; road: 2–4–2–0)

Game	Date	Score	Opponent	Record	Recap
1	October 4, 2001	2–5	@ Philadelphia Flyers (2001–02)	0–1–0–0	L
2	October 6, 2001	0–3	New York Islanders (2001–02)	0–2–0–0	L
3	October 7, 2001	5–0	@ Tampa Bay Lightning (2001–02)	1–2–0–0	W
4	October 10, 2001	0–2	Ottawa Senators (2001–02)	1–3–0–0	L
5	October 13, 2001	2–5	Philadelphia Flyers (2001–02)	1–4–0–0	L
6	October 16, 2001	2–2 OT	@ Vancouver Canucks (2001–02)	1–4–1–0	T
7	October 18, 2001	1–3	@ Calgary Flames (2001–02)	1–5–1–0	L
8	October 20, 2001	2–6	@ Edmonton Oilers (2001–02)	1–6–1–0	L
9	October 24, 2001	3–4 OT	Washington Capitals (2001–02)	1–6–1–1	OTL
10	October 26, 2001	3–2	Los Angeles Kings (2001–02)	2–6–1–1	W
11	October 28, 2001	2–2 OT	@ Pittsburgh Penguins (2001–02)	2–6–2–1	T
12	October 30, 2001	2–3	@ New York Islanders (2001–02)	2–7–2–1	L
13	October 31, 2001	3–1	@ New York Rangers (2001–02)	3–7–2–1	W

November: 3–7–0–2 (home: 2–4–0–1; road: 1–3–0–1)

Game	Date	Score	Opponent	Record	Recap
14	November 3, 2001	3–5	New York Rangers (2001–02)	3–8–2–1	L
15	November 7, 2001	2–0	Pittsburgh Penguins (2001–02)	4–8–2–1	W
16	November 10, 2001	2–3 OT	Philadelphia Flyers (2001–02)	4–8–2–2	OTL
17	November 12, 2001	3–5	Buffalo Sabres (2001–02)	4–9–2–2	L
18	November 14, 2001	2–3	Toronto Maple Leafs (2001–02)	4–10–2–2	L
19	November 16, 2001	2–0	@ Buffalo Sabres (2001–02)	5–10–2–2	W
20	November 17, 2001	0–1 OT	@ Montreal Canadiens (2001–02)	5–10–2–3	OTL
21	November 19, 2001	1–5	@ Toronto Maple Leafs (2001–02)	5–11–2–3	L
22	November 21, 2001	6–0	Mighty Ducks of Anaheim (2001–02)	6–11–2–3	W
23	November 24, 2001	1–5	New Jersey Devils (2001–02)	6–12–2–3	L
24	November 27, 2001	1–4	@ Colorado Avalanche (2001–02)	6–13–2–3	L
25	November 29, 2001	0–6	@ Minnesota Wild (2001–02)	6–14–2–3	L

December: 6–6–1–0 (home: 4–4–0–0; road: 2–2–1–0)

Game	Date	Score	Opponent	Record	Recap
26	December 1, 2001	2–5	Atlanta Thrashers (2001–02)	6–15–2–3	L
27	December 5, 2001	2–0	Columbus Blue Jackets (2001–02)	7–15–2–3	W
28	December 8, 2001	2–3	Carolina Hurricanes (2001–02)	7–16–2–3	L
29	December 12, 2001	1–4	@ Carolina Hurricanes (2001–02)	7–17–2–3	L
30	December 14, 2001	3–2	@ New Jersey Devils (2001–02)	8–17–2–3	W
31	December 15, 2001	3–1	@ New York Islanders (2001–02)	9–17–2–3	W
32	December 17, 2001	2–4	@ New York Rangers (2001–02)	9–18–2–3	L
33	December 19, 2001	5–2	Washington Capitals (2001–02)	10–18–2–3	W
34	December 22, 2001	0–2	St. Louis Blues (2001–02)	10–19–2–3	L
35	December 26, 2001	3–3 OT	@ Atlanta Thrashers (2001–02)	10–19–3–3	T
36	December 28, 2001	1–7	Boston Bruins (2001–02)	10–20–3–3	L
37	December 29, 2001	4–2	Toronto Maple Leafs (2001–02)	11–20–3–3	W
38	December 31, 2001	4–3	Atlanta Thrashers (2001–02)	12–20–3–3	W

January: 4–10–1–0 (home: 1–7–0–0; road: 3–3–1–0)

Game	Date	Score	Opponent	Record	Recap
39	January 2, 2002	1–3	@ Los Angeles Kings (2001–02)	12–21–3–3	L
40	January 4, 2002	2–1	@ Mighty Ducks of Anaheim (2001–02)	13–21–3–3	W
41	January 5, 2002	0–6	@ San Jose Sharks (2001–02)	13–22–3–3	L
42	January 7, 2002	2–1	@ Washington Capitals (2001–02)	14–22–3–3	W
43	January 9, 2002	2–3	Dallas Stars (2001–02)	14–23–3–3	L
44	January 11, 2002	2–4	Ottawa Senators (2001–02)	14–24–3–3	L
45	January 12, 2002	0–1	Washington Capitals (2001–02)	14–25–3–3	L
46	January 16, 2002	0–3	Chicago Blackhawks (2001–02)	14–26–3–3	L
47	January 18, 2002	3–2	@ Dallas Stars (2001–02)	15–26–3–3	W
48	January 19, 2002	1–6	Atlanta Thrashers (2001–02)	15–27–3–3	L
49	January 21, 2002	7–5	Montreal Canadiens (2001–02)	16–27–3–3	W
50	January 23, 2002	1–3	New Jersey Devils (2001–02)	16–28–3–3	L
51	January 25, 2002	1–1 OT	@ Carolina Hurricanes (2001–02)	16–28–4–3	T
52	January 26, 2002	2–4	@ Boston Bruins (2001–02)	16–29–4–3	L
53	January 30, 2002	1–3	Phoenix Coyotes (2001–02)	16–30–4–3	L

February: 1–5–1–1 (home: 0–1–1–1; road: 1–4–0–0)

Game	Date	Score	Opponent	Record	Recap
54	February 4, 2002	6–6 OT	New York Islanders (2001–02)	16–30–5–3	T
55	February 6, 2002	2–3	Tampa Bay Lightning (2001–02)	16–31–5–3	L
56	February 7, 2002	3–1	@ Tampa Bay Lightning (2001–02)	17–31–5–3	W
57	February 9, 2002	1–4	@ Boston Bruins (2001–02)	17–32–5–3	L
58	February 12, 2002	0–1	@ Nashville Predators (2001–02)	17–33–5–3	L
59	February 13, 2002	4–5	@ Chicago Blackhawks (2001–02)	17–34–5–3	L
60	February 26, 2002	3–4	@ Washington Capitals (2001–02)	17–35–5–3	L
61	February 27, 2002	2–3 OT	Detroit Red Wings (2001–02)	17–35–5–4	OTL

March: 4–7–2–1 (home: 2–3–2–0; road: 2–4–0–1)

Game	Date	Score	Opponent	Record	Recap
62	March 2, 2002	2–3	@ Tampa Bay Lightning (2001–02)	17–36–5–4	L
63	March 5, 2002	5–6 OT	@ Pittsburgh Penguins (2001–02)	17–36–5–5	OTL
64	March 8, 2002	5–4	Edmonton Oilers (2001–02)	18–36–5–5	W
65	March 9, 2002	2–2 OT	Nashville Predators (2001–02)	18–36–6–5	T
66	March 13, 2002	3–3 OT	Calgary Flames (2001–02)	18–36–7–5	T
67	March 15, 2002	5–2	Buffalo Sabres (2001–02)	19–36–7–5	W
68	March 17, 2002	0–2	@ Ottawa Senators (2001–02)	19–37–7–5	L
69	March 20, 2002	1–4	Montreal Canadiens (2001–02)	19–38–7–5	L
70	March 21, 2002	2–3	@ Carolina Hurricanes (2001–02)	19–39–7–5	L
71	March 23, 2002	1–3	Boston Bruins (2001–02)	19–40–7–5	L
72	March 25, 2002	1–3	@ New Jersey Devils (2001–02)	19–41–7–5	L
73	March 26, 2002	2–1	@ Montreal Canadiens (2001–02)	20–41–7–5	W
74	March 28, 2002	4–3	@ Ottawa Senators (2001–02)	21–41–7–5	W
75	March 30, 2002	2–4	New York Rangers (2001–02)	21–42–7–5	L

April: 1–2–3–1 (home: 1–1–0–1; road: 0–1–3–0)

Game	Date	Score	Opponent	Record	Recap
76	April 3, 2002	3–2	Pittsburgh Penguins (2001–02)	22–42–7–5	W
77	April 5, 2002	1–3	@ Buffalo Sabres (2001–02)	22–43–7–5	L
78	April 6, 2002	2–2 OT	@ Toronto Maple Leafs (2001–02)	22–43–8–5	T
79	April 8, 2002	4–4 OT	@ Philadelphia Flyers (2001–02)	22–43–9–5	T
80	April 10, 2002	4–4 OT	@ Atlanta Thrashers (2001–02)	22–43–10–5	T
81	April 12, 2002	1–3	Carolina Hurricanes (2001–02)	22–44–10–5	L
82	April 14, 2002	2–3 OT	Tampa Bay Lightning (2001–02)	22–44–10–6	OTL

Legend: W Win (2 points) L Loss (0 points) T Tie (1 point) OTL Overtime loss (1 point)

== Player statistics ==
=== Scoring ===
- Position abbreviations: C = Center; D = Defense; G = Goaltender; LW = Left wing; RW = Right wing
- † = Joined team via a transaction (e.g., trade, waivers, signing) during the season. Stats reflect time with the Panthers only.
- ‡ = Left team via a transaction (e.g., trade, waivers, release) during the season. Stats reflect time with the Panthers only.

No.	Player	Pos	Regular season					
No.	Player	Pos	GP	G	A	Pts	+/-	PIM
10	Pavel Bure‡	RW	56	22	27	49	−14	56
22	Kristian Huselius	LW	79	23	22	45	−4	14
18	Marcus Nilson	LW	81	14	19	33	−14	55
28	Jason Wiemer	C	70	11	20	31	−4	178
39	Ivan Novoseltsev	RW	70	13	16	29	−10	44
44	Sandis Ozolinsh†	D	37	10	19	29	−3	24
12	Olli Jokinen	C	80	9	20	29	−16	98
24	Robert Svehla	D	82	7	22	29	−19	87
14	Niklas Hagman	LW	78	10	18	28	−6	8
25	Viktor Kozlov	C	50	9	18	27	−16	20
20	Valeri Bure	RW	31	8	10	18	−3	12
45	Brad Ference	D	80	2	15	17	−13	254
16	Kevyn Adams‡	C	44	4	8	12	−3	28
43	Byron Ritchie†	C	31	5	6	11	−2	34
11	Bill Lindsay‡	RW	63	4	7	11	−11	117
4	Bret Hedican‡	D	31	3	7	10	−4	12
8	Peter Worrell	LW	79	4	5	9	−15	354
26	Pierre Dagenais†	RW	26	7	1	8	−5	4
3	Paul Laus	D	45	4	3	7	1	157
29	Darren Van Impe†‡	D	36	1	6	7	3	31
26	Dan Boyle‡	D	25	3	3	6	−1	12
49	Lance Ward	D	68	1	4	5	−20	131
38	Eric Beaudoin	LW	8	1	3	4	−2	4
17	Ryan Johnson	C	29	1	3	4	−5	10
5	Jeff Norton†	D	29	0	4	4	−5	8
55 (Note: Ulanov wore number 5 in his first twelve games after being acquired.)	Igor Ulanov†	D	14	0	4	4	−3	11
21	Denis Shvidki	RW	8	1	2	3	−4	2
2	Lance Pitlick	D	35	1	1	2	−14	12
19	Stephen Weiss	C	7	1	1	2	0	0
32 (Note: Jardine wore number 41 in his first game.)	Ryan Jardine	LW	8	0	2	2	0	2
42	Brad Norton	D	22	0	2	2	−2	45
36	Joey Tetarenko	RW	38	1	0	1	−5	123
37	Trevor Kidd	G	33	0	1	1		0
1	Roberto Luongo	G	58	0	1	1		2
31	Wade Flaherty	G	4	0	0	0		0
42 (Note: Herr wore number 7 in his first two games.)	Matt Herr	C	3	0	0	0	−2	0
29	Lukas Krajicek	D	5	0	0	0	0	0
33	David Morisset	RW	4	0	0	0	−7	5
23	Kyle Rossiter	D	2	0	0	0	−1	2
41 (Note: Smith wore number 42 in his first three games.)	Nick Smith	C	15	0	0	0	−1	0
23	Rocky Thompson	D	6	0	0	0	0	12

=== Goaltending ===
No.	Player	Regular season									
No.	Player	GP	W	L	T	SA	GA	GAA	SV%	SO	TOI
1	Roberto Luongo	58	16	33	4	1653	140	2.77	.915	4	3030
37	Trevor Kidd	33	4	16	5	857	90	3.21	.895	1	1683
31	Wade Flaherty	4	2	1	1	148	12	2.94	.919	0	245

== Awards and records ==
=== Awards ===
Type	Award/honor	Recipient	Ref
League (annual)	NHL All-Rookie Team	Kristian Huselius (Forward)	
League (in-season)	NHL All-Star Game selection	Sandis Ozolinsh (Note: Ozolinsh was voted to the starting lineup.)	
League (in-season)	NHL Rookie of the Month	Kristian Huselius (October)	
League (in-season)	NHL Rookie of the Month	Niklas Hagman (March)	
League (in-season)	NHL YoungStars Game selection	Kristian Huselius	
League (in-season)	NHL YoungStars Game selection	Roberto Luongo	

=== Milestones ===
Milestone	Player	Date	Ref
First game	Niklas Hagman	October 4, 2001	
First game	Kristian Huselius	October 4, 2001	
First game	David Morisset	November 21, 2001	
First game	Nick Smith	December 1, 2001	
First game	Brad Norton	January 21, 2002	
First game	Ryan Jardine	March 17, 2002	
First game	Eric Beaudoin	March 20, 2002	
First game	Kyle Rossiter	April 3, 2002	
First game	Stephen Weiss	April 3, 2002	
First game	Lukas Krajicek	April 6, 2002	
400th goal scored	Pavel Bure	January 26, 2002	

== Transactions ==
The Panthers were involved in the following transactions from June 10, 2001, the day after the deciding game of the 2001 Stanley Cup Final, through June 13, 2002, the day of the deciding game of the 2002 Stanley Cup Final.

=== Trades ===
Date	Details		Ref
June 23, 2001	To Florida Panthers: St. Louis’ 1st-round pick in 2001	To New Jersey Devils: Phoenix’s 2nd-round pick in 2001; Vancouver’s 2nd-round pick in 2001	
June 23, 2001	To Florida Panthers: 2nd-round pick in 2001	To Philadelphia Flyers: Rights to Jiri Dopita	
June 23, 2001	To Florida Panthers: Valeri Bure; Jason Wiemer	To Calgary Flames: Rob Niedermayer; Philadelphia’s 2nd-round pick in 2001	
June 23, 2001	To Florida Panthers: 3rd-round pick in 2001	To New York Islanders: 4th-round pick in 2001; 3rd-round pick in 2002	
June 30, 2001	To Florida Panthers: Future considerations	To New York Rangers: Dave Duerden	
July 10, 2001	To Florida Panthers: Ryan Johnson; 6th-round pick in 2003	To Tampa Bay Lightning: Vaclav Prospal	
January 7, 2002	To Florida Panthers: 5th-round pick in 2003	To Tampa Bay Lightning: Dan Boyle	
January 16, 2002	To Florida Panthers: Sandis Ozolinsh; Byron Ritchie	To Carolina Hurricanes: Kevyn Adams; Bret Hedican; Rights to Tomas Malec; Conditional 2nd-round pick in 2003	
March 18, 2002	To Florida Panthers: Igor Ulanov; Rights to Filip Novak; 1st-round pick in 2002; 2nd-round pick in 2002; 4th-round pick in 2003	To New York Rangers: Pavel Bure; 2nd-round pick in 2002	
March 19, 2002	To Florida Panthers: 5th-round pick in 2003	To New York Islanders: Darren Van Impe	
March 19, 2002	To Florida Panthers: 6th-round pick in 2002	To Boston Bruins: Jeff Norton	

=== Players acquired ===
Date	Player	Former team	Term	Via	Ref
July 5, 2001	Paul Elliott	Regina Pats (WHL)		Free agency	
July 10, 2001	Jeff Norton	San Jose Sharks		Free agency	
July 27, 2001	Brad Norton	Edmonton Oilers		Free agency	
August 2, 2001	Andrew Allen	Dayton Bombers (ECHL)		Free agency	
August 2, 2001	Wade Flaherty	Tampa Bay Lightning	2-year	Free agency	
August 20, 2001	Matt Herr	Philadelphia Flyers	1-year	Free agency	
August 23, 2001	Bill Lindsay	San Jose Sharks	2-year	Free agency	
December 18, 2001	Darren Van Impe	New York Rangers		Waivers	
January 12, 2002	Pierre Dagenais	New Jersey Devils		Waivers	

=== Players lost ===
Date	Player	New team	Via (Note: In parentheses is the player's free agency group on July 1 if applicable.)	Ref
N/A	Yan Golubovsky	Metallurg Magnitogorsk (RSL)	Free agency (VI)	
July 1, 2001	Greg Adams (Note: Adams was inactive during the 2001–02 season.)		Contract expiration (III)	
July 1, 2001	Len Barrie (Note: Barrie retired.)		Contract expiration (UFA)	
July 4, 2001	Anders Eriksson	Toronto Maple Leafs	Free agency (UFA)	
July 5, 2001	Mike Wilson	Pittsburgh Penguins	Free agency (UFA)	
July 19, 2001	Richard Shulmistra	Eisbaren Berlin (DEL)	Free agency (VI)	
August 14, 2001	Peter Ratchuk	Pittsburgh Penguins	Free agency (UFA)	
August 15, 2001	Andrej Podkonicky	HIFK (Liiga)	Free agency (UFA)	
September 13, 2001	Paul Brousseau	AIK (SHL)	Free agency (VI)	
September 21, 2001	Ryan Bach	Sheffield Steelers (BISL)	Free agency (VI)	
N/A	Sean Gauthier	Reading Royals (ECHL)	Free agency (VI)	
October 2, 2001	Chris Allen	B.C. Icemen (UHL)	Free agency (UFA)	
October 2, 2001	John Jakopin	Pittsburgh Penguins	Waivers	
October 23, 2001	Remi Royer	Pensacola Ice Pilots (ECHL)	Free agency (UFA)	
March 19, 2002	Bill Lindsay	Montreal Canadiens	Waivers	

=== Signings ===
Date	Player	Term	Contract type	Ref
June 30, 2001	Vaclav Prospal	1-year	Option exercised	
July 5, 2001	Niklas Hagman		Entry-level	
July 5, 2001	Kristian Huselius		Entry-level	
July 16, 2001	Dan Boyle	1-year	Re-signing	
July 16, 2001	Ivan Majesky	1-year	Entry-level	
July 18, 2001	John Jakopin	1-year	Re-signing	
July 20, 2001	Olli Jokinen	1-year	Re-signing	
July 27, 2001	Joey Tetarenko	1-year	Re-signing	
July 27, 2001	Rocky Thompson	2-year	Re-signing	
August 14, 2001	Marcus Nilson	3-year	Re-signing	
August 20, 2001	David Morisset	3-year	Entry-level	
August 20, 2001	Lance Ward	2-year	Re-signing	
September 13, 2001	Roberto Luongo	4-year	Extension	
September 15, 2001	Ryan Johnson	2-year	Re-signing	
September 20, 2001	Valeri Bure	3-year	Re-signing	
April 16, 2002	Lukas Krajicek	3-year	Entry-level	
April 16, 2002	Stephen Weiss	3-year	Entry-level	
May 31, 2002	Filip Novak		Entry-level	
May 31, 2002	Byron Ritchie	multi-year	Extension	

== Draft picks ==
Florida's draft picks at the 2001 NHL entry draft held at the National Car Rental Center in Sunrise, Florida.

Round	#	Player	Nationality	College/Junior/Club team (League)
1	4	Stephen Weiss	Canada	Plymouth Whalers (OHL)
1	24	Lukas Krajicek	Czech Republic	Peterborough Petes (OHL)
2	34	Greg Watson	Canada	Prince Albert Raiders (WHL)
3	64	Tomas Malec	Slovakia	Rimouski Oceanic (QMJHL)
3	68	Grant McNeill	Canada	Prince Albert Raiders (WHL)
4	117	Michael Woodford	United States	Cushing Academy (USHS-MA)
5	136	Billy Thompson	Canada	Prince George Cougars (WHL)
6	169	Dustin Johner	Canada	Seattle Thunderbirds (WHL)
7	200	Toni Koivisto	Finland	Lukko (Finland)
8	231	Kyle Bruce	Canada	Prince Albert Raiders (WHL)
9	263	Jan Blanar	Slovakia	Dukla Trencin (Slovakia)
9	267	Ivan Majesky	Slovakia	Ilves (Finland)

== See also ==
- 2001–02 NHL season
