= 2001–02 New York Islanders season =

NHL hockey team season

2001–02 New York Islanders
- Division: 2nd Atlantic
- Conference: 5th Eastern
- 2001–02 record: 42–28–8–4
- Home record: 21–13–5–2
- Road record: 21–15–3–2
- Goals for: 239
- Goals against: 220

Team information
- General manager: Mike Milbury
- Coach: Peter Laviolette
- Captain: Michael Peca
- Alternate captains: Claude Lapointe (Note: During the first half of the season, Lapointe was the second alternate in home games and Scatchard in road games. During the second half of the season, Scatchard was the second alternate in home games and Lapointe in road games.); Dave Scatchard; Alexei Yashin
- Arena: Nassau Veterans Memorial Coliseum
- Average attendance: 14,548 (89.6%)
- Minor league affiliates: Bridgeport Sound Tigers; Trenton Titans

Team leaders
- Goals: Alexei Yashin (32)
- Assists: Alexei Yashin (43)
- Points: Alexei Yashin (75)
- Penalty minutes: Eric Cairns (176)
- Plus/minus: Adrian Aucoin (+23)
- Wins: Chris Osgood (32)
- Goals against average: Chris Osgood (2.50)

The 2001–02 New York Islanders season was the 30th season of the professional ice hockey team. This season saw the Islanders finish in second place in the Atlantic Division with a record of 42 wins, 28 losses, eight ties and four overtime losses for 96 points. They qualified for the playoffs for the first time since 1994 as the fifth seed in the Eastern Conference, but lost their first-round playoff series to the Toronto Maple Leafs in seven games.

== Off-season ==
Newly acquired forward Michael Peca was named team captain.

== Regular season ==
The Islanders scored the most shorthanded goals during the regular season, with 17.

=== Final standings ===
Atlantic Division
No.	CR		GP	W	L	T	OTL	GF	GA	Pts
1	2	**Philadelphia Flyers**	82	42	27	10	3	234	192	97
2	5	**New York Islanders**	82	42	28	8	4	239	220	96
3	6	**New Jersey Devils**	82	41	28	9	4	205	187	95
4	11	New York Rangers	82	36	38	4	4	227	258	80
5	12	Pittsburgh Penguins	82	28	41	8	5	198	249	69

Note: CR = Conference rank; GP = Games played; W = Wins; L = Losses; T = Ties; OTL = Overtime loss; GF = Goals for; GA = Goals against; Pts = Points
Bolded teams qualified for the playoffs.

Eastern Conference
R		Div	GP	W	L	T	OTL	GF	GA	Pts
**1**	**Z-** Boston Bruins	**NE**	**82**	**43**	**24**	**6**	**9**	**236**	**201**	101
**2**	**Y-** Philadelphia Flyers	**AT**	**82**	**42**	**27**	**10**	**3**	**234**	**192**	97
**3**	**Y-** Carolina Hurricanes	**SE**	**82**	**35**	**26**	**16**	**5**	**217**	**217**	91
**4**	**X-** Toronto Maple Leafs	**NE**	**82**	**43**	**25**	**10**	**4**	**249**	**207**	100
**5**	**X-** New York Islanders	**AT**	**82**	**42**	**28**	**8**	**4**	**239**	**220**	96
**6**	**X-** New Jersey Devils	**AT**	**82**	**41**	**28**	**9**	**4**	**205**	**187**	95
**7**	**X-** Ottawa Senators	**NE**	**82**	**39**	**27**	**9**	**7**	**243**	**208**	94
**8**	**X-** Montreal Canadiens	**NE**	**82**	**36**	**31**	**12**	**3**	**207**	**209**	87
8.5
9	Washington Capitals	SE	82	36	33	11	2	228	240	85
10	Buffalo Sabres	NE	82	35	35	11	1	213	200	82
11	New York Rangers	AT	82	36	38	4	4	227	258	80
12	Pittsburgh Penguins	AT	82	28	41	8	5	198	249	69
13	Tampa Bay Lightning	SE	82	27	40	11	4	178	219	69
14	Florida Panthers	SE	82	22	44	10	6	180	250	60
15	Atlanta Thrashers	SE	82	19	47	11	5	187	288	54

Divisions: AT – Atlantic, NE – Northeast, SE – Southeast

Z – Clinched conference; Y – Clinched division; X – Clinched playoff spot

== Schedule and results ==
=== Regular season ===
2001–02 regular season
October: 9–0–1–1 (home: 3–0–1–1; road: 6–0–0–0)

Game	Date	Score	Opponent	Record	Recap
1	October 5, 2001	3–2	@ Tampa Bay Lightning (2001–02)	1–0–0–0	W
2	October 6, 2001	3–0	@ Florida Panthers (2001–02)	2–0–0–0	W
3	October 10, 2001	6–3	@ Pittsburgh Penguins (2001–02)	3–0–0–0	W
4	October 11, 2001	6–4	@ New Jersey Devils (2001–02)	4–0–0–0	W
5	October 13, 2001	4–5 OT	Detroit Red Wings (2001–02)	4–0–0–1	OTL
6	October 17, 2001	4–0	@ Carolina Hurricanes (2001–02)	5–0–0–1	W
7	October 18, 2001	2–1 OT	Carolina Hurricanes (2001–02)	6–0–0–1	W
8	October 20, 2001	2–2 OT	San Jose Sharks (2001–02)	6–0–1–1	T
9	October 26, 2001	3–2 OT	@ Carolina Hurricanes (2001–02)	7–0–1–1	W
10	October 28, 2001	3–2 OT	Dallas Stars (2001–02)	8–0–1–1	W
11	October 30, 2001	3–2	Florida Panthers (2001–02)	9–0–1–1	W

November: 6–5–3–0 (home: 4–1–2–0; road: 2–4–1–0)

Game	Date	Score	Opponent	Record	Recap
12	November 2, 2001	1–2	@ Detroit Red Wings (2001–02)	9–1–1–1	L
13	November 3, 2001	2–1	@ Philadelphia Flyers (2001–02)	10–1–1–1	W
14	November 6, 2001	3–0	Tampa Bay Lightning (2001–02)	11–1–1–1	W
15	November 8, 2001	2–6	New York Rangers (2001–02)	11–2–1–1	L
16	November 10, 2001	2–3	@ Montreal Canadiens (2001–02)	11–3–1–1	L
17	November 14, 2001	3–3 OT	@ Pittsburgh Penguins (2001–02)	11–3–2–1	T
18	November 16, 2001	0–1	@ Colorado Avalanche (2001–02)	11–4–2–1	L
19	November 17, 2001	1–6	@ Phoenix Coyotes (2001–02)	11–5–2–1	L
20	November 19, 2001	3–2	@ Dallas Stars (2001–02)	12–5–2–1	W
21	November 21, 2001	5–4	Colorado Avalanche (2001–02)	13–5–2–1	W
22	November 23, 2001	3–1	Toronto Maple Leafs (2001–02)	14–5–2–1	W
23	November 24, 2001	5–3	Mighty Ducks of Anaheim (2001–02)	15–5–2–1	W
24	November 27, 2001	5–5 OT	Washington Capitals (2001–02)	15–5–3–1	T
25	November 29, 2001	1–1 OT	Montreal Canadiens (2001–02)	15–5–4–1	T

December: 4–6–1–1 (home: 2–4–1–0; road: 2–2–0–1)

Game	Date	Score	Opponent	Record	Recap
26	December 1, 2001	2–4	Buffalo Sabres (2001–02)	15–6–4–1	L
27	December 4, 2001	2–3	Philadelphia Flyers (2001–02)	15–7–4–1	L
28	December 6, 2001	2–0	@ Philadelphia Flyers (2001–02)	16–7–4–1	W
29	December 7, 2001	3–4	@ Chicago Blackhawks (2001–02)	16–8–4–1	L
30	December 11, 2001	2–2 OT	Ottawa Senators (2001–02)	16–8–5–1	T
31	December 12, 2001	2–3 OT	@ New Jersey Devils (2001–02)	16–8–5–2	OTL
32	December 15, 2001	1–3	Florida Panthers (2001–02)	16–9–5–2	L
33	December 18, 2001	4–1	Edmonton Oilers (2001–02)	17–9–5–2	W
34	December 21, 2001	2–1	@ New York Rangers (2001–02)	18–9–5–2	W
35	December 22, 2001	2–4	Boston Bruins (2001–02)	18–10–5–2	L
36	December 27, 2001	2–5	@ Ottawa Senators (2001–02)	18–11–5–2	L
37	December 29, 2001	6–5 OT	Montreal Canadiens (2001–02)	19–11–5–2	W

January: 7–7–0–1 (home: 2–4–0–1; road: 5–3–0–0)

Game	Date	Score	Opponent	Record	Recap
38	January 1, 2002	2–3	@ Washington Capitals (2001–02)	19–12–5–2	L
39	January 3, 2002	4–2	Pittsburgh Penguins (2001–02)	20–12–5–2	W
40	January 5, 2002	0–3	Los Angeles Kings (2001–02)	20–13–5–2	L
41	January 6, 2002	3–2	@ Atlanta Thrashers (2001–02)	21–13–5–2	W
42	January 8, 2002	2–5	Calgary Flames (2001–02)	21–14–5–2	L
43	January 10, 2002	0–4	@ Montreal Canadiens (2001–02)	21–15–5–2	L
44	January 12, 2002	5–4	@ Boston Bruins (2001–02)	22–15–5–2	W
45	January 15, 2002	3–1	@ Calgary Flames (2001–02)	23–15–5–2	W
46	January 17, 2002	2–3	@ San Jose Sharks (2001–02)	23–16–5–2	L
47	January 19, 2002	3–2	@ Los Angeles Kings (2001–02)	24–16–5–2	W
48	January 22, 2002	4–5	New York Rangers (2001–02)	24–17–5–2	L
49	January 24, 2002	4–5 OT	Pittsburgh Penguins (2001–02)	24–17–5–3	OTL
50	January 26, 2002	6–2	Tampa Bay Lightning (2001–02)	25–17–5–3	W
51	January 29, 2002	1–3	New Jersey Devils (2001–02)	25–18–5–3	L
52	January 30, 2002	6–3	@ New York Rangers (2001–02)	26–18–5–3	W

February: 3–1–2–0 (home: 2–0–1–0; road: 1–1–1–0)

Game	Date	Score	Opponent	Record	Recap
53	February 4, 2002	6–6 OT	@ Florida Panthers (2001–02)	26–18–6–3	T
54	February 5, 2002	4–3	St. Louis Blues (2001–02)	27–18–6–3	W
55	February 7, 2002	4–1	Toronto Maple Leafs (2001–02)	28–18–6–3	W
56	February 10, 2002	3–4	@ Minnesota Wild (2001–02)	28–19–6–3	L
57	February 12, 2002	1–0 OT	@ Philadelphia Flyers (2001–02)	29–19–6–3	W
58	February 26, 2002	3–3 OT	Boston Bruins (2001–02)	29–19–7–3	T

March: 7–8–0–1 (home: 5–3–0–0; road: 2–5–0–1)

Game	Date	Score	Opponent	Record	Recap
59	March 1, 2002	3–4	@ Atlanta Thrashers (2001–02)	29–20–7–3	L
60	March 2, 2002	4–1	Atlanta Thrashers (2001–02)	30–20–7–3	W
61	March 4, 2002	2–4	Pittsburgh Penguins (2001–02)	30–21–7–3	L
62	March 7, 2002	0–5	Buffalo Sabres (2001–02)	30–22–7–3	L
63	March 8, 2002	2–4	@ Columbus Blue Jackets (2001–02)	30–23–7–3	L
64	March 10, 2002	6–1	Atlanta Thrashers (2001–02)	31–23–7–3	W
65	March 12, 2002	3–0	@ Buffalo Sabres (2001–02)	32–23–7–3	W
66	March 13, 2002	2–3	@ New Jersey Devils (2001–02)	32–24–7–3	L
67	March 16, 2002	3–4	@ Ottawa Senators (2001–02)	32–25–7–3	L
68	March 19, 2002	2–3 OT	@ Toronto Maple Leafs (2001–02)	32–25–7–4	OTL
69	March 21, 2002	3–2	Vancouver Canucks (2001–02)	33–25–7–4	W
70	March 23, 2002	2–1	Minnesota Wild (2001–02)	34–25–7–4	W
71	March 25, 2002	4–2	New York Rangers (2001–02)	35–25–7–4	W
72	March 27, 2002	1–4	Ottawa Senators (2001–02)	35–26–7–4	L
73	March 28, 2002	5–4	@ Toronto Maple Leafs (2001–02)	36–26–7–4	W
74	March 30, 2002	2–4	@ Washington Capitals (2001–02)	36–27–7–4	L

April: 6–1–1–0 (home: 3–1–0–0; road: 3–0–1–0)

Game	Date	Score	Opponent	Record	Recap
75	April 1, 2002	4–2	New Jersey Devils (2001–02)	37–27–7–4	W
76	April 3, 2002	1–1 OT	@ Buffalo Sabres (2001–02)	37–27–8–4	T
77	April 4, 2002	2–1 OT	@ Boston Bruins (2001–02)	38–27–8–4	W
78	April 6, 2002	5–4	Washington Capitals (2001–02)	39–27–8–4	W
79	April 8, 2002	1–2	Carolina Hurricanes (2001–02)	39–28–8–4	L
80	April 11, 2002	5–2	@ Nashville Predators (2001–02)	40–28–8–4	W
81	April 12, 2002	3–1	@ Tampa Bay Lightning (2001–02)	41–28–8–4	W
82	April 14, 2002	3–1	Philadelphia Flyers (2001–02)	42–28–8–4	W

Legend: W Win (2 points) L Loss (0 points) T Tie (1 point) OTL Overtime loss (1 point)

=== Playoffs ===
2002 Stanley Cup playoffs
Eastern Conference Quarterfinals vs. (4) Toronto Maple Leafs – Maple Leafs win 4–3

Game	Date	Score	Opponent	Series	Recap
1	April 18, 2002	1–3	@ Toronto Maple Leafs	Maple Leafs lead 1–0	L
2	April 20, 2002	0–2	@ Toronto Maple Leafs	Maple Leafs lead 2–0	L
3	April 23, 2002	6–1	Toronto Maple Leafs	Maple Leafs lead 2–1	W
4	April 24, 2002	4–3	Toronto Maple Leafs	Series tied 2–2	W
5	April 26, 2002	3–6	@ Toronto Maple Leafs	Maple Leafs lead 3–2	L
6	April 28, 2002	5–3	Toronto Maple Leafs	Series tied 3–3	W
7	April 30, 2002	2–4	@ Toronto Maple Leafs	Maple Leafs win 4–3	L

Legend: W Win L Loss

== Player statistics ==
=== Scoring ===
- Position abbreviations: C = Center; D = Defense; G = Goaltender; LW = Left wing; RW = Right wing
- † = Joined team via a transaction (e.g., trade, waivers, signing) during the season. Stats reflect time with the Islanders only.
- ‡ = Left team via a transaction (e.g., trade, waivers, release) during the season. Stats reflect time with the Islanders only.

No.	Player	Pos	Regular season						Playoffs					
No.	Player	Pos	GP	G	A	Pts	+/-	PIM	GP	G	A	Pts	+/-	PIM
79	Alexei Yashin	C	78	32	43	75	−3	25	7	3	4	7	−2	2
37	Mark Parrish	RW	78	30	30	60	10	32	7	2	1	3	−6	6
27	Michael Peca	C	80	25	35	60	19	62	5	1	0	1	−5	2
17	Shawn Bates	C	71	17	35	52	18	30	7	2	4	6	−5	11
21	Mariusz Czerkawski	RW	82	22	29	51	−8	48	7	2	2	4	−3	4
15	Brad Isbister	LW	79	17	21	38	1	113	3	1	1	2	0	17
12	Oleg Kvasha	LW	71	13	25	38	−4	80	7	0	1	1	1	6
4	Roman Hamrlik	D	70	11	26	37	7	78	7	1	6	7	−6	6
3	Adrian Aucoin	D	81	12	22	34	23	62	7	2	5	7	−1	4
29	Kenny Jonsson	D	76	10	22	32	15	26	5	1	2	3	−2	4
38	Dave Scatchard	C	80	12	15	27	−4	111	7	1	1	2	−2	22
11	Kip Miller†	C	37	7	17	24	2	6	7	4	2	6	−2	2
13	Claude Lapointe	C	80	9	12	21	−9	60	7	0	0	0	−2	14
8 (Note: Tarnstrom wore number 47 through February 12.)	Dick Tarnstrom	D	62	3	16	19	−12	38	5	0	0	0	−2	2
55	Jason Blake	C	82	8	10	18	−11	36	7	0	1	1	−2	13
10	Mats Lindgren	LW	59	3	12	15	0	16	—	—	—	—	—	—
33	Eric Cairns	D	74	2	5	7	−2	176	7	0	0	0	−2	15
20	Steve Webb	RW	60	2	4	6	0	104	7	0	0	0	1	12
45	Marko Kiprusoff‡	D	27	0	6	6	0	4	—	—	—	—	—	—
24	Radek Martinek	D	23	1	4	5	5	16	—	—	—	—	—	—
35	Chris Osgood	G	66	0	4	4		10	7	0	0	0		4
28	Darren Van Impe†	D	14	1	2	3	6	16	7	0	4	4	−5	8
25	Juraj Kolnik	RW	7	2	0	2	−2	0	—	—	—	—	—	—
36	Evgeny Korolev	D	17	0	2	2	0	6	2	0	0	0	0	0
2	Branislav Mezei	D	24	0	2	2	2	12	—	—	—	—	—	—
6	Ken Sutton	D	21	0	2	2	−5	8	—	—	—	—	—	—
16	Raffi Torres	LW	14	0	1	1	2	6	—	—	—	—	—	—
18	Jim Cummins†	RW	10	0	0	0	−5	31	1	0	0	0	0	9
14	Ted Donato†‡	LW	1	0	0	0	−1	0	—	—	—	—	—	—
41	Ray Giroux	D	2	0	0	0	−1	2	—	—	—	—	—	—
7	Kevin Haller	D	1	0	0	0	−1	2	—	—	—	—	—	—
14	Alexander Kharitonov	LW	5	0	0	0	−1	4	—	—	—	—	—	—
28	Jason Krog	C	2	0	0	0	0	0	—	—	—	—	—	—
56	Jason Podollan	RW	1	0	0	0	0	2	—	—	—	—	—	—
51	Dave Roche‡†	LW	1	0	0	0	0	0	—	—	—	—	—	—
39	Ray Schultz	D	2	0	0	0	−1	5	2	0	0	0	2	2
30	Garth Snow	G	25	0	0	0		14	1	0	0	0		0
46	Marko Tuomainen	RW	1	0	0	0	−1	0	—	—	—	—	—	—
43	Trent Hunter	RW	—	—	—	—	—	—	4	1	1	2	1	2

=== Goaltending ===
No.	Player	Regular season										Playoffs								
No.	Player	GP	W	L	T	SA	GA	GAA	SV%	SO	TOI	GP	W	L	SA	GA	GAA	SV%	SO	TOI
35	Chris Osgood	66	32	25	6	1727	156	2.50	.910	4	3743	7	3	4	193	17	2.60	.912	0	392
30	Garth Snow	25	10	7	2	549	55	2.71	.900	2	1217	1	0	0	19	2	4.62	.895	0	26

== Awards and records ==
=== Awards ===
Type	Award/honor	Recipient	Ref
League (annual)	Frank J. Selke Trophy	Michael Peca	
League (in-season)	NHL All-Star Game selection	Mark Parrish	
League (in-season)	NHL All-Star Game selection	Alexei Yashin	
League (in-season)	NHL Player of the Month	Chris Osgood (October)	
League (in-season)	NHL Player of the Week	Mark Parrish (October 15)	
Team	Bob Nystrom Award	Steve Webb	

=== Milestones ===
Milestone	Player	Date	Ref
First game	Radek Martinek	October 5, 2001	
First game	Dick Tarnstrom	October 30, 2001	
First game	Raffi Torres	November 24, 2001	
First game	Trent Hunter	April 24, 2002	

== Transactions ==
The Islanders were involved in the following transactions from June 10, 2001, the day after the deciding game of the 2001 Stanley Cup Final, through June 13, 2002, the day of the deciding game of the 2002 Stanley Cup Final.

=== Trades ===
Date	Details		Ref
June 22, 2001	To New York Islanders: Adrian Aucoin; Alexander Kharitonov	To Tampa Bay Lightning: Mathieu Biron; 2nd-round pick in 2002	
June 23, 2001	To New York Islanders: Alexei Yashin	To Ottawa Senators: Zdeno Chara; Bill Muckalt; 1st-round pick in 2001	
June 23, 2001	To New York Islanders: 4th-round pick in 2001; 3rd-round pick in 2002	To Florida Panthers: 3rd-round pick in 2001	
June 24, 2001	To New York Islanders: Rights to Michael Peca	To Buffalo Sabres: Tim Connolly; Taylor Pyatt	
January 14, 2002	To New York Islanders: Jim Cummins	To Anaheim Mighty Ducks: Dave Roche	
March 19, 2002	To New York Islanders: Darren Van Impe	To Florida Panthers: 5th-round pick in 2003	
March 19, 2002	To New York Islanders: Dave Roche	To Anaheim Mighty Ducks: Ben Guite; Rights to Bjorn Melin	

=== Players acquired ===
Date	Player	Former team	Term	Via	Ref
June 15, 2001	Marko Kiprusoff	Kloten Flyers (NLA)	multi-year	Free agency	
July 1, 2001	Garth Snow	Pittsburgh Penguins	2-year	Free agency	
July 5, 2001	Ken Sutton	New Jersey Devils	2-year	Free agency	
July 6, 2001	Shawn Bates	Boston Bruins	2-year	Free agency	
July 18, 2001	Marko Tuomainen	Los Angeles Kings		Free agency	
August 1, 2001	Chris Armstrong	Minnesota Wild	1-year	Free agency	
August 1, 2001	Ben Guite	Tallahassee Tiger Sharks (ECHL)		Free agency	
August 16, 2001	Dave Roche	Calgary Flames		Free agency	
August 24, 2001	Jason Podollan	Tampa Bay Lightning		Free agency	
September 28, 2001	Chris Osgood	Detroit Red Wings		Waiver draft	
January 16, 2002	Ted Donato	Manchester Monarchs (AHL)		Free agency	
January 16, 2002	Kip Miller	Grand Rapids Griffins (AHL)	1-year	Free agency	

=== Players lost ===
Date	Player	New team	Via (Note: In parentheses is the player's free agency group on July 1 if applicable.)	Ref
August 1, 2001	Aris Brimanis	Anaheim Mighty Ducks	Free agency (UFA)	
August 3, 2001	Chris Terreri		Retirement (III)	
August 30, 2001	Steve Martins	Ottawa Senators	Free agency (UFA)	
September 18, 2001	Craig Berube	Calgary Flames	Free agency (III)	
September 25, 2001	Mark Lawrence	Kalamazoo Wings (UHL)	Free agency (UFA)	
October 2001	Anders Myrvold	Hartford Wolf Pack (AHL)	Free agency (VI)	
December 22, 2001	Garry Galley		Retirement (III)	
January 30, 2002	Ted Donato	Los Angeles Kings	Waivers	
January 30, 2002	Marko Kiprusoff	HC TPS (Liiga) (Note: Kiprusoff signed with TPS.)	Mutual release	
April 17, 2002	Marko Tuomainen	Espoo Blues (Liiga)	Free agency	

=== Signings ===
Date	Player	Term	Contract type	Ref
June 15, 2001	Mats Lindgren		Re-signing	
June 15, 2001	Radek Martinek	multi-year	Entry-level	
June 15, 2001	Dick Tarnstrom	multi-year	Entry-level	
July 6, 2001	Dusan Salficky	1-year	Entry-level	
July 10, 2001	Mariusz Czerkawski	3-year	Re-signing	
July 11, 2001	Brad Isbister	2-year	Re-signing	
July 26, 2001	Steve Valiquette	2-year	Re-signing	
July 30, 2001	Ray Schultz	1-year	Re-signing	
July 31, 2001	Evgeny Korolev	2-year	Re-signing	
August 2, 2001	Adrian Aucoin	1-year	Re-signing	
August 2, 2001	Jason Krog	1-year	Re-signing	
August 7, 2001	Jason Blake	3-year	Extension	
August 9, 2001	Mark Parrish	1-year	Re-signing	
August 13, 2001	Kenny Jonsson	2-year	Re-signing	
August 15, 2001	Alexander Kharitonov	1-year (Note: Club option for a second year.)	Re-signing	
August 29, 2001	Michael Peca	5-year	Re-signing	
September 5, 2001	Alexei Yashin	10-year	Re-signing	

== Draft picks ==
New York's draft picks at the 2001 NHL entry draft held at the National Car Rental Center in Sunrise, Florida.

Round	#	Player	Nationality	College/Junior/Club team (League)
4	101	Cory Stillman	Canada	Kingston Frontenacs (OHL)
5	132	Dusan Salficky	Czech Republic	HC Plzeň (Czech Republic)
6	166	Andy Chiodo	Canada	Toronto St. Michael's Majors (OHL)
7	197	Jan Holub	Czech Republic	HC Bílí Tygři Liberec (Czech Republic)
8	228	Mike Bray	Canada	Quebec Remparts (QMJHL)
9	260	Brian Perez	United States	Des Moines Buccaneers (USHL)
9	280	Roman Kukhtinov	Russia	Metallurg Novokuznetsk (Russia)
9	287	Juha-Pekka Ketola	Finland	Lukko (Finland)

== See also ==
- 2001–02 NHL season
