= Jan Holub =

Jan Holub may refer to:

- Jan Holub (ice hockey) (born 1983), Czech ice hockey player
- Jan Holub I (1942–2018), Czech speedway rider
- Jan Holub II (born 1968), Czech speedway rider
- Jan Holub III (born 1991), Czech speedway rider
