= 2001–02 Atlanta Thrashers season =

American ice hockey club season

2001–02 Atlanta Thrashers
- Division: 5th Southeast
- Conference: 15th Eastern
- 2001–02 record: 19–47–11–5
- Home record: 11–21–9–0
- Road record: 8–26–2–5
- Goals for: 187
- Goals against: 288

Team information
- General manager: Don Waddell
- Coach: Curt Fraser
- Captain: Ray Ferraro (Oct-Mar); Vacant (Mar-Apr)
- Alternate captains: Jeff Odgers; Chris Tamer
- Arena: Philips Arena
- Average attendance: 13,668
- Minor league affiliates: Chicago Wolves; Greenville Grrrowl

Team leaders
- Goals: Ilya Kovalchuk (29)
- Assists: Dany Heatley (41)
- Points: Dany Heatley (67)
- Penalty minutes: Jeff Odgers (135)
- Plus/minus: Andy Sutton (0)
- Wins: Milan Hnilicka (13)
- Goals against average: Norm Maracle (3.00)

The 2001–02 Atlanta Thrashers season was the 20th season of play for the National Hockey League franchise that was established on June 22, 1979, and 27th season for the organization overall. For the second time in three seasons, the team finished the season with the worst record in the whole NHL, and failed to qualify for the playoffs for the third consecutive season.

== Off-season ==
With Steve Staios departing to the Edmonton Oilers via free agency, Ray Ferraro was named the team’s new captain.

== Regular season ==
The Thrashers struggled defensively, finishing 30th overall in goaltending, with 288 goals allowed, and on the power play, with only 37 power-play goals scored. They also allowed the most-short-handed goals of all 30 teams, with 12.

=== Final standings ===
Southeast Division
No.	CR		GP	W	L	T	OTL	GF	GA	Pts
1	3	**Carolina Hurricanes**	82	35	26	16	5	217	217	91
2	9	Washington Capitals	82	36	33	11	2	228	240	85
3	13	Tampa Bay Lightning	82	27	40	11	4	178	219	69
4	14	Florida Panthers	82	22	44	10	6	180	250	60
5	15	Atlanta Thrashers	82	19	47	11	5	187	288	54

Note: CR = Conference rank; GP = Games played; W = Wins; L = Losses; T = Ties; OTL = Overtime loss; GF = Goals for; GA = Goals against; Pts = Points
Bolded teams qualified for the playoffs.

Eastern Conference
R		Div	GP	W	L	T	OTL	GF	GA	Pts
**1**	**Z-** Boston Bruins	**NE**	**82**	**43**	**24**	**6**	**9**	**236**	**201**	101
**2**	**Y-** Philadelphia Flyers	**AT**	**82**	**42**	**27**	**10**	**3**	**234**	**192**	97
**3**	**Y-** Carolina Hurricanes	**SE**	**82**	**35**	**26**	**16**	**5**	**217**	**217**	91
**4**	**X-** Toronto Maple Leafs	**NE**	**82**	**43**	**25**	**10**	**4**	**249**	**207**	100
**5**	**X-** New York Islanders	**AT**	**82**	**42**	**28**	**8**	**4**	**239**	**220**	96
**6**	**X-** New Jersey Devils	**AT**	**82**	**41**	**28**	**9**	**4**	**205**	**187**	95
**7**	**X-** Ottawa Senators	**NE**	**82**	**39**	**27**	**9**	**7**	**243**	**208**	94
**8**	**X-** Montreal Canadiens	**NE**	**82**	**36**	**31**	**12**	**3**	**207**	**209**	87
8.5
9	Washington Capitals	SE	82	36	33	11	2	228	240	85
10	Buffalo Sabres	NE	82	35	35	11	1	213	200	82
11	New York Rangers	AT	82	36	38	4	4	227	258	80
12	Pittsburgh Penguins	AT	82	28	41	8	5	198	249	69
13	Tampa Bay Lightning	SE	82	27	40	11	4	178	219	69
14	Florida Panthers	SE	82	22	44	10	6	180	250	60
15	Atlanta Thrashers	SE	82	19	47	11	5	187	288	54

Divisions: AT – Atlantic, NE – Northeast, SE – Southeast

Z – Clinched conference; Y – Clinched division; X – Clinched playoff spot

== Schedule and results ==
2001–02 regular season
October: 3–4–1–2 (home: 2–4–1–0; road: 1–0–0–2)

Game	Date	Score	Opponent	Record	Recap
1	October, 4, 2001	2–1	@ Buffalo Sabres (2001-02)	1–0–0–0	W
2	October, 6, 2001	3–4 OT	@ Boston Bruins (2001-02)	1–0–0–1	OTL
3	October 13, 2001	5–2	Carolina Hurricanes (2001-02)	1–1–0–1	L
4	October 16, 2001	3–3	Philadelphia Flyers (2001-02)	1–1–1–1	T
5	October 19, 2001	3–4	New York Rangers (2001–02)	1–2–1–1	L
6	October 20, 2001	1–2 OT	@ Carolina Hurricanes (2001–02)	1–2–1–2	OTL
7	October 23, 2001	2–4	Pittsburgh Penguins (2001–02)	1–3–1–2	L
8	October 26, 2001	1–0	Washington Capitals (2001–02)	2–3–1–2	W
9	October 27, 2001	4–3	Tampa Bay Lightning (2001–02)	3–3–1–2	W
10	October 30, 2001	3–6	Ottawa Senators (2001–02)	3–4–1–2	L

November: 2–11–1–0 (home: 1–1–1–0; road: 1–10–0–0)

Game	Date	Score	Opponent	Record	Recap
11	November 1, 2001	2–5	@ San Jose Sharks (2001–02)	3–5–1–2	L
12	November 3, 2001	1–4	@ Los Angeles Kings (2001–02)	3–6–1–2	L
13	November 4, 2001	0–5	@ Mighty Ducks of Anaheim (2001–02)	3–7–1–2	L
14	November 7, 2001	2–3	@ New Jersey Devils (2001–02)	3–8–1–2	L
15	November 8, 2001	0–8	@ Buffalo Sabres (2001–02)	3–9–1–2	L
16	November 10, 2001	0–3	@ Washington Capitals (2001–02)	3–10–1–2	L
17	November 13, 2001	2–4	@ Minnesota Wild (2001–02)	3–11–1–2	L
18	November 16, 2001	4–4 OT	Nashville Predators (2001–02)	3–11–2–2	T
19	November 18, 2001	2–6	@ New York Rangers (2001–02)	3–12–2–2	L
20	November 19, 2001	3–2	Buffalo Sabres (2001–02)	4–12–2–2	W
21	November 22, 2001	2–5	Montreal Canadiens (2001–02)	4–13–2–2	L
22	November 24, 2001	6–3	@ Ottawa Senators (2001–02)	5–13–2–2	W
23	November 27, 2001	1–5	@ Montreal Canadiens (2001–02)	5–14–2–2	L
24	November 29, 2001	2–5	@ Tampa Bay Lightning (2001–02)	5–15–2–2	L

December: 3–8–3–1 (home: 1–5–3–0; road: 2–3–0–1)

Game	Date	Score	Opponent	Record	Recap
25	December 1, 2001	5–2	@ Florida Panthers (2001–02)	6–15–2–2	W
26	December 4, 2001	2–3	Boston Bruins (2001–02)	6–16–2–2	L
27	December 6, 2001	3–3 OT	Washington Capitals (2001–02)	6–16–3–2	T
28	December 8, 2001	3–6	@ Pittsburgh Penguins (2001–02)	6–17–3–2	L
29	December 10, 2001	1–3	Philadelphia Flyers (2001–02)	6–18–3–2	L
30	December 12, 2001	3–3 OT	Montreal Canadiens (2001–02)	6–18–4–2	T
31	December 14, 2001	1–3	Chicago Blackhawks (2001–02)	6–19–4–2	L
32	December 15, 2001	2–5	@ Washington Capitals (2001–02)	6–20–4–2	L
33	December 18, 2001	3–2 OT	@ Boston Bruins (2001–02)	7–20–4–2	W
34	December 19, 2001	2–4	San Jose Sharks (2001–02)	7–21–4–2	L
35	December 21, 2001	4–5 OT	@ Carolina Hurricanes (2001–02)	7–21–4–3	OTL
36	December 23, 2001	1–4	Dallas Stars (2001–02)	7–22–4–3	L
37	December 26, 2001	3–3 OT	Florida Panthers (2001–02)	7–22–5–3	T
38	December 28, 2001	5–4	Toronto Maple Leafs (2001–02)	8–22–5–3	W
39	December 31, 2001	3–4	@ Florida Panthers (2001–02)	8–23–5–3	L

January: 5–8–1–1 (home: 3–4–1–0; road: 2–4–0–1)

Game	Date	Score	Opponent	Record	Recap
40	January 2, 2002	1–2	@ Dallas Stars (2001–02)	8–24–5–3	L
41	January 3, 2002	1–2	@ Phoenix Coyotes (2001–02)	8–25–5–3	L
42	January 6, 2002	2–3	New York Islanders (2001–02)	8–26–5–3	L
43	January 8, 2002	4–7	@ Philadelphia Flyers (2001–02)	8–27–5–3	L
44	January 9, 2002	4–3 OT	Ottawa Senators (2001–02)	9–27–5–3	W
45	January 11, 2002	1–0	Calgary Flames (2001–02)	10–27–5–3	W
46	January 13, 2002	2–2 OT	Tampa Bay Lightning (2001–02)	10–27–6–3	T
47	January 15, 2002	3–2	@ Toronto Maple Leafs (2001–02)	11–27–6–3	W
48	January 17, 2002	3–6	@ Philadelphia Flyers (2001–02)	11–28–6–3	L
49	January 19, 2002	6–1	@ Florida Panthers (2001–02)	12–28–6–3	W
50	January 22, 2002	0–3	Washington Capitals (2001–02)	12–29–6–3	L
51	January 24, 2002	4–2	New Jersey Devils (2001–02)	13–29–6–3	W
52	January 26, 2002	2–3 OT	@ Pittsburgh Penguins (2001–02)	13–29–6–4	OTL
53	January 28, 2002	2–4	Phoenix Coyotes (2001–02)	13–30–6–4	L
54	January 30, 2002	0–6	Toronto Maple Leafs (2001–02)	13–31–6–4	L

February: 2–3–1–0 (home: 2–1–0–0; road: 0–2–1–0)

Game	Date	Score	Opponent	Record	Recap
55	February 5, 2002	3–2	Edmonton Oilers (2001–02)	14–31–6–4	W
56	February 7, 2002	3–3 OT	@ New Jersey Devils (2001–02)	14–31–7–4	T
57	February 8, 2002	1–2	New York Rangers (2001–02)	14–32–7–4	L
58	February 11, 2002	4–5	@ Toronto Maple Leafs (2001–02)	14–33–7–4	L
59	February 12, 2002	0–3	@ St. Louis Blues (2001–02)	14–34–7–4	L
60	February 26, 2002	2–1	Buffalo Sabres (2001–02)	15–34–7–4	W

March: 4–10–1–0 (home: 2–5–1–0; road: 2–5–0–0)

Game	Date	Score	Opponent	Record	Recap
61	March 1, 2002	4–3	New York Islanders (2001–02)	16–34–7–4	W
62	March 2, 2002	1–4	@ New York Islanders (2001–02)	16–35–7–4	L
63	March 4, 2002	3–5	@ Montreal Canadiens (2001–02)	16–36–7–4	L
64	March 6, 2002	1–4	Mighty Ducks of Anaheim (2001–02)	16–37–7–4	L
65	March 8, 2002	0–3	Boston Bruins (2001–02)	16–38–7–4	L
66	March 10, 2002	1–6	@ New York Islanders (2001–02)	16–39–7–4	L
67	March 12, 2002	4–4 OT	Tampa Bay Lightning (2001–02)	16–39–8–4	T
68	March 14, 2002	2–0	Colorado Avalanche (2001–02)	17–39–8–4	W
69	March 16, 2002	2–4	Vancouver Canucks (2001–02)	17–40–8–4	L
70	March 18, 2002	2–4	Pittsburgh Penguins (2001–02)	17–41–8–4	L
71	March 20, 2002	2–4	@ Tampa Bay Lightning (2001–02)	17–42–8–4	L
72	March 22, 2002	5–2	@ New York Rangers (2001–02)	18–42–8–4	W
73	March 23, 2002	3–2 OT	@ Ottawa Senators (2001–02)	19–42–8–4	W
74	March 27, 2002	2–4	Minnesota Wild (2001–02)	19–43–8–4	L
75	March 30, 2002	1–4	@ Detroit Red Wings (2001–02)	19–44–8–4	L

April: 0–3–3–1 (home: 0–1–2–0; road: 0–2–1–1)

Game	Date	Score	Opponent	Record	Recap
76	April 2, 2002	2–4	@ Calgary Flames (2001–02)	19–45–8–4	L
77	April 3, 2002	0–6	@ Colorado Avalanche (2001–02)	19–46–8–4	L
78	April 5, 2002	1–3	New Jersey Devils (2001–02)	19–47–8–4	L
79	April 7, 2002	1–1 OT	@ Carolina Hurricanes (2001–02)	19–47–9–4	T
80	April 10, 2002	4–4 OT	Florida Panthers (2001–02)	19–47–10–4	T
81	April 12, 2002	4–5 OT	@ Columbus Blue Jackets (2001–02)	19–47–10–5	OTL
82	April 14, 2002	2–2 OT	Carolina Hurricanes (2001–02)	19–47–11–5	T

Legend: W Win (2 points) L Loss (0 points) T Tie (1 point) OTL Overtime loss (1 point)

== Player statistics ==
=== Scoring ===
- Position abbreviations: C = Center; D = Defense; G = Goaltender; LW = Left wing; RW = Right wing
- † = Joined team via a transaction (e.g., trade, waivers, signing) during the season. Stats reflect time with the Thrashers only.
- ‡ = Left team via a transaction (e.g., trade, waivers, release) during the season. Stats reflect time with the Thrashers only.

No.	Player	Pos	Regular season					
No.	Player	Pos	GP	G	A	Pts	+/-	PIM
15	Dany Heatley	LW	82	26	41	67	−19	56
17	Ilya Kovalchuk	LW	65	29	22	51	−19	28
12	Tony Hrkac	C	80	18	26	44	−12	12
18	Lubos Bartecko	LW	71	13	14	27	−15	30
21	Ray Ferraro‡	C	61	8	19	27	−32	66
8	Frantisek Kaberle	D	61	5	20	25	−11	24
38	Yannick Tremblay	D	66	9	15	24	−15	47
13	Patrik Stefan	C	59	7	16	23	−4	22
14	Tomi Kallio	LW	60	8	14	22	−8	12
26	Pascal Rheaume†	C	42	11	9	20	−3	25
9	Hnat Domenichelli‡	LW	40	8	11	19	−18	34
36	Daniel Tjarnqvist	D	75	2	16	18	−22	14
39	Per Svartvadet	C	78	3	12	15	−12	24
22	Shean Donovan‡	RW	48	6	6	12	−16	40
3	Brian Pothier	D	33	3	6	9	−19	22
20	Jeff Odgers	RW	46	4	4	8	−3	135
28	Todd Reirden	D	65	3	5	8	−25	82
71	Jiri Slegr‡	D	38	3	5	8	−21	51
24	Andreas Karlsson	C	42	1	7	8	−8	20
27	Bob Corkum‡	C	65	3	4	7	−30	16
4	Chris Tamer	D	78	3	3	6	−11	111
19	Brad Tapper	RW	20	2	4	6	−3	43
16	Jeff Cowan†	LW	38	4	1	5	−11	50
47	J. P. Vigier	RW	15	4	1	5	−5	4
25	Andy Sutton†	D	24	0	4	4	0	46
10	Yuri Butsayev†	LW	8	2	0	2	1	4
29	Darcy Hordichuk‡	LW	33	1	1	2	−5	127
37	Dan Snyder	C	11	1	1	2	−3	30
33	Milan Hnilicka	G	60	0	2	2		8
6	David Harlock‡	D	19	0	1	1	−2	18
22 (Note: Piros wore number 25 in his first five games.)	Kamil Piros	C	8	0	1	1	−2	4
43	Mike Weaver	D	16	0	1	1	0	10
2	Petr Buzek‡	D	9	0	0	0	−4	13
35	Frederic Cassivi†	G	6	0	0	0		0
23	Brett Clark‡	D	2	0	0	0	−3	0
9	Mark Hartigan†	C	2	0	0	0	−2	2
6	Francis Lessard†	RW	5	0	0	0	0	26
23	Derek MacKenzie	C	1	0	0	0	−1	2
34	Norm Maracle	G	1	0	0	0		0
31	Pasi Nurminen	G	9	0	0	0		0
1	Damian Rhodes	G	15	0	0	0		0
29	Kirill Safronov†	D	2	0	0	0	−3	2
40	Luke Sellars	D	1	0	0	0	0	2
45	Ben Simon	LW	6	0	0	0	1	6

=== Goaltending ===
- † = Joined team via a transaction (e.g., trade, waivers, signing) during the season. Stats reflect time with the Thrashers only.

No.	Player	Regular season									
No.	Player	GP	W	L	T	SA	GA	GAA	SV%	SO	TOI
33	Milan Hnilicka	60	13	33	10	1956	179	3.19	.908	3	3367
35	Frederic Cassivi†	6	2	3	0	207	17	3.32	.918	0	307
31	Pasi Nurminen	9	2	5	0	275	28	3.61	.898	0	465
1	Damian Rhodes	15	2	10	1	439	47	3.67	.893	0	769
34	Norm Maracle	1	0	1	0	20	3	3.00	.850	0	60

== Awards and records ==
=== Awards ===
Type	Award/honor	Recipient	Ref
League (annual)	Calder Memorial Trophy	Dany Heatley	
League (annual)	NHL All-Rookie Team	Dany Heatley (Forward)	
League (annual)	NHL All-Rookie Team	Ilya Kovalchuk (Forward)	
League (in-season)	NHL Rookie of the Month	Dany Heatley & Ilya Kovalchuk (December)	
League (in-season)	NHL Rookie of the Month	Ilya Kovalchuk (January)	
League (in-season)	NHL YoungStars Game selection	Dany Heatley	
League (in-season)	NHL YoungStars Game selection	Ilya Kovalchuk	
Team	Community Service Award	Jeff Odgers	
Team	Players' Player Award	Jeff Odgers	
Team	Team MVP	Dany Heatley	
Team	Team MVP	Ilya Kovalchuk	
Team	Three Stars of the Game Award	Dany Heatley	
Team	Three Stars of the Game Award	Milan Hnilicka	

=== Milestones ===
Milestone	Player	Date	Ref
First game	Dany Heatley	October 4, 2001	
First game	Ilya Kovalchuk	October 4, 2001	
First game	Kamil Piros	October 4, 2001	
First game	Daniel Tjarnqvist	October 4, 2001	
First game	Ben Simon	November 10, 2001	
First game	Mike Weaver	November 27, 2001	
First game	Pasi Nurminen	January 30, 2002	
First game	Frederic Cassivi	March 20, 2002	
First game	Luke Sellars	March 23, 2002	
First game	Francis Lessard	March 27, 2002	
First game	Mark Hartigan	April 2, 2002	
First game	Derek MacKenzie	April 12, 2002	
400th goal scored	Ray Ferraro	December 28, 2001	

== Transactions ==
The Thrashers were involved in the following transactions from June 10, 2001, the day after the deciding game of the 2001 Stanley Cup Final, through June 13, 2002, the day of the deciding game of the 2002 Stanley Cup Final.

=== Trades ===
Date	Details		Ref
June 24, 2001	To Atlanta Thrashers: 4th-round pick in 2001; 7th-round pick in 2002	To New Jersey Devils: 3rd-round pick in 2002	
June 24, 2001	To Atlanta Thrashers: Lubos Bartecko	To St. Louis Blues: 4th-round pick in 2001	
June 24, 2001	To Atlanta Thrashers: Jeff Dessner	To New York Rangers: 8th-round pick in 2001	
July 2, 2001	To Atlanta Thrashers: Future considerations	To Anaheim Mighty Ducks: Denny Lambert	
December 18, 2001	To Atlanta Thrashers: Jeff Cowan; Rights to Kurtis Foster	To Calgary Flames: Petr Buzek; Conditional draft pick in 2003 (Note: 6th-round pick in 2004)	
January 22, 2002	To Atlanta Thrashers: Andy Sutton	To Minnesota Wild: Hnat Domenichelli	
January 24, 2002	To Atlanta Thrashers: Frederic Cassivi	To Colorado Avalanche: Brett Clark	
March 6, 2002	To Atlanta Thrashers: Joe DiPenta	To Philadelphia Flyers: Jarrod Skalde	
March 16, 2002	To Atlanta Thrashers: Francis Lessard	To Philadelphia Flyers: David Harlock; 3rd-round pick in 2003; 7th-round pick in 2003	
March 18, 2002	To Atlanta Thrashers: 4th-round pick in 2002	To St. Louis Blues: Ray Ferraro	
March 19, 2002	To Atlanta Thrashers: 5th-round pick in 2002	To Buffalo Sabres: Bob Corkum	
March 19, 2002	To Atlanta Thrashers: Kirill Safronov; Rights to Ruslan Zainullin; 4th-round pick in 2002	To Phoenix Coyotes: Darcy Hordichuk; 4th-round pick in 2002; 5th round pick in 2002	
March 19, 2002	To Atlanta Thrashers: Yuri Butsayev; 3rd-round pick in 2002	To Detroit Red Wings: Jiri Slegr	

=== Players acquired ===
Date	Player	Former team	Term	Via	Ref
July 16, 2001	Bob Corkum	New Jersey Devils		Free agency	
July 16, 2001	Tony Hrkac	Anaheim Mighty Ducks		Free agency	
July 16, 2001	Todd Reirden	St. Louis Blues		Free agency	
September 28, 2001	Karl Stewart	Plymouth Whalers (OHL)		Free agency	
November 14, 2001	Pascal Rheaume	Chicago Blackhawks		Waivers	
March 27, 2002	Mark Hartigan	St. Cloud State University (WCHA)		Free agency	

=== Players lost ===
Date	Player	New team	Via (Note: In parentheses is the player's free agency group on July 1 if applicable.)	Ref
June 19, 2001	Yves Sarault	Nashville Predators	Waivers	
June 25, 2001	Dean Sylvester		Retirement (UFA)	
July 1, 2001	Brian Wesenberg (Note: Wesenberg retired.)		Contract expiration (UFA)	
July 2, 2001	Andrei Skopintsev	HC Dynamo Moscow (RSL)	Free agency (VI)	
July 6, 2001	Andrew Brunette	Minnesota Wild	Free agency (UFA)	
July 12, 2001	Steve Staios	Edmonton Oilers	Free agency (UFA)	
August 7, 2001	Rumun Ndur	Chicago Blackhawks	Free agency (VI)	
August 10, 2001	Herbert Vasiljevs	Vancouver Canucks	Free agency (VI)	
August 23, 2001	Wes Mason	Augusta Lynx (ECHL)	Free agency (UFA)	
August 29, 2001	Hugo Boisvert	Grand Rapids Griffins (AHL)	Free agency (UFA)	
September 8, 2001	Sean Ritchlin	Reading Royals (ECHL)	Free agency (UFA)	
October 10, 2001	Ladislav Kohn	Detroit Red Wings	Free agency (UFA)	
October 18, 2001	Chris Joseph	HC TPS (Liiga)	Free agency (III)	
October 21, 2001	Steve Guolla	New Jersey Devils	Free agency (UFA)	
January 29, 2002	Gord Murphy	Boston Bruins	Free agency (III)	
March 15, 2002	Shean Donovan	Pittsburgh Penguins	Waivers	

=== Signings ===
Date	Player	Term	Contract type	Ref
June 19, 2001	J. P. Vigier		Re-signing	
July 2, 2001	Hnat Domenichelli		Re-signing	
July 3, 2001	Jeff Dessner		Entry-level	
July 3, 2001	Libor Ustrnul		Entry-level	
July 12, 2001	Norm Maracle		Re-signing	
July 12, 2001	Pasi Nurminen		Entry-level	
July 17, 2001	Frantisek Kaberle		Re-signing	
July 18, 2001	Brett Clark		Re-signing	
July 18, 2001	Per Svartvadet		Re-signing	
July 27, 2001	Jiri Slegr		Re-signing	
July 30, 2001	Bryan Adams		Re-signing	
July 30, 2001	Lubos Bartecko		Re-signing	
July 30, 2001	Daniel Tjarnqvist		Entry-level	
July 31, 2001	Shean Donovan		Re-signing	
August 14, 2001	Ilya Kovalchuk		Entry-level	
August 27, 2001	Simon Gamache		Entry-level	
December 19, 2001	Kurtis Foster		Entry-level	
May 6, 2002	Jeff Odgers		Extension	
May 23, 2002	Frederic Cassivi		Extension	

== Draft picks ==
Atlanta's draft picks at the 2001 NHL entry draft held at the National Car Rental Center in Sunrise, Florida.

Round	#	Player	Nationality	College/Junior/Club team (League)
1	1	Ilya Kovalchuk	Russia	Spartak Moscow (Russia)
3	80	Michael Garnett	Canada	Saskatoon Blades (WHL)
4	100	Brian Sipotz	United States	Miami University (NCAA)
4	112	Milan Gajic	Canada	Burnaby Express (BCJHL)
5	135	Colin Stuart	United States	Colorado College (NCAA)
6	189	Pasi Nurminen	Finland	Jokerit (Finland)
7	199	Matt Suderman	Canada	Saskatoon Blades (WHL)
7	201	Colin FitzRandolph	United States	Phillips Exeter Academy (NH)
9	262	Mario Cartelli	Czech Republic	Ocelari Trinec (Czech Republic)

== See also ==
- 2001-02 NHL season
