= 2001–02 Carolina Hurricanes season =

National Hockey League team season

2001–02 Carolina Hurricanes
- Eastern Conference champions
- Southeast Division champions
- Division: 1st Southeast
- Conference: 3rd Eastern
- 2001–02 record: 35–26–16–5
- Home record: 15–13–11–2
- Road record: 20–13–5–3
- Goals for: 217
- Goals against: 217

Team information
- General manager: Jim Rutherford
- Coach: Paul Maurice
- Captain: Ron Francis
- Alternate captains: Rod Brind'Amour; Glen Wesley
- Arena: Raleigh Sports and Entertainment Arena
- Average attendance: 15,508
- Minor league affiliates: Lowell Lock Monsters; Florida Everblades

Team leaders
- Goals: Jeff O'Neill (31)
- Assists: Ron Francis (50)
- Points: Ron Francis (77)
- Penalty minutes: Darren Langdon (106)
- Plus/minus: Sami Kapanen (+9)
- Wins: Arturs Irbe (20)
- Goals against average: Arturs Irbe (2.54)

The 2001–02 Carolina Hurricanes season was the franchise's 23rd season in the National Hockey League and fifth as the Hurricanes. The Hurricanes made it as far as the Stanley Cup Finals, but lost in five games to the Detroit Red Wings.

== Regular season ==
The Hurricanes had the most power-play opportunities of all 30 NHL teams, with 391.

On January 29, 2002, in a 2-2 tie against the Buffalo Sabres, Ron Francis was honored in a pregame ceremony due to his many high achievements, such as 1,500 games played overall, 1,000 games played as a member of the Hurricanes and recording his 500th career goal (which he achieved 27 days prior in a 6-3 loss to the Boston Bruins), and earning second place in all-time assists in National Hockey League history, passing Ray Bourque (which he achieved three days earlier in a 4-2 loss to the Philadelphia Flyers).

=== Final standings ===
Southeast Division
| No. | CR | | GP | W | L | T | OTL | GF | GA | Pts |
|---|---|---|---|---|---|---|---|---|---|---|
| 1 | 3 | **Carolina Hurricanes** | 82 | 35 | 26 | 16 | 5 | 217 | 217 | 91 |
| 2 | 9 | Washington Capitals | 82 | 36 | 33 | 11 | 2 | 228 | 240 | 85 |
| 3 | 13 | Tampa Bay Lightning | 82 | 27 | 40 | 11 | 4 | 178 | 219 | 69 |
| 4 | 14 | Florida Panthers | 82 | 22 | 44 | 10 | 6 | 180 | 250 | 60 |
| 5 | 15 | Atlanta Thrashers | 82 | 19 | 47 | 11 | 5 | 187 | 288 | 54 |

Note: CR = Conference rank; GP = Games played; W = Wins; L = Losses; T = Ties; OTL = Overtime loss; GF = Goals for; GA = Goals against; Pts = Points
Bolded teams qualified for the playoffs.

Eastern Conference
| R | | Div | GP | W | L | T | OTL | GF | GA | Pts |
|---|---|---|---|---|---|---|---|---|---|---|
| **1** | **Z-** Boston Bruins | **NE** | **82** | **43** | **24** | **6** | **9** | **236** | **201** | 101 |
| **2** | **Y-** Philadelphia Flyers | **AT** | **82** | **42** | **27** | **10** | **3** | **234** | **192** | 97 |
| **3** | **Y-** Carolina Hurricanes | **SE** | **82** | **35** | **26** | **16** | **5** | **217** | **217** | 91 |
| **4** | **X-** Toronto Maple Leafs | **NE** | **82** | **43** | **25** | **10** | **4** | **249** | **207** | 100 |
| **5** | **X-** New York Islanders | **AT** | **82** | **42** | **28** | **8** | **4** | **239** | **220** | 96 |
| **6** | **X-** New Jersey Devils | **AT** | **82** | **41** | **28** | **9** | **4** | **205** | **187** | 95 |
| **7** | **X-** Ottawa Senators | **NE** | **82** | **39** | **27** | **9** | **7** | **243** | **208** | 94 |
| **8** | **X-** Montreal Canadiens | **NE** | **82** | **36** | **31** | **12** | **3** | **207** | **209** | 87 |
8.5
| 9 | Washington Capitals | SE | 82 | 36 | 33 | 11 | 2 | 228 | 240 | 85 |
| 10 | Buffalo Sabres | NE | 82 | 35 | 35 | 11 | 1 | 213 | 200 | 82 |
| 11 | New York Rangers | AT | 82 | 36 | 38 | 4 | 4 | 227 | 258 | 80 |
| 12 | Pittsburgh Penguins | AT | 82 | 28 | 41 | 8 | 5 | 198 | 249 | 69 |
| 13 | Tampa Bay Lightning | SE | 82 | 27 | 40 | 11 | 4 | 178 | 219 | 69 |
| 14 | Florida Panthers | SE | 82 | 22 | 44 | 10 | 6 | 180 | 250 | 60 |
| 15 | Atlanta Thrashers | SE | 82 | 19 | 47 | 11 | 5 | 187 | 288 | 54 |

Divisions: AT – Atlantic, NE – Northeast, SE – Southeast

Z – Clinched conference; Y – Clinched division; X – Clinched playoff spot

== Schedule and results ==
=== Regular season ===
2001–02 regular season
October: 6–5–0–2 (home: 4–4–0–1; road: 2–1–0–1)

| Game | Date | Score | Opponent | Record | Attendance | Recap |
|---|---|---|---|---|---|---|
| 1 | October 5, 2001 | 3–1 | New York Rangers (2001–02) | 1–0–0–0 | 18,730 | W |
| 2 | October 7, 2001 | 3–0 | Dallas Stars (2001–02) | 2–0–0–0 | 15,365 | W |
| 3 | October 9, 2001 | 2–6 | Ottawa Senators (2001–02) | 2–1–0–0 | 10,052 | L |
| 4 | October 11, 2001 | 2–3 | Toronto Maple Leafs (2001–02) | 2–2–0–0 | 14,106 | L |
| 5 | October 13, 2001 | 5–2 | @ Atlanta Thrashers (2001–02) | 3–2–0–0 | 18,545 | W |
| 6 | October 17, 2001 | 0–4 | New York Islanders (2001–02) | 3–3–0–0 | 12,237 | L |
| 7 | October 18, 2001 | 1–2 OT | @ New York Islanders (2001–02) | 3–3–0–1 | 9,647 | OTL |
| 8 | October 20, 2001 | 2–1 OT | Atlanta Thrashers (2001–02) | 4–3–0–1 | 14,219 | W |
| 9 | October 23, 2001 | 1–5 | @ Colorado Avalanche (2001–02) | 4–4–0–1 | 18,007 | L |
| 10 | October 24, 2001 | 7–3 | @ Minnesota Wild (2001–02) | 5–4–0–1 | 18,064 | W |
| 11 | October 26, 2001 | 2–3 OT | New York Islanders (2001–02) | 5–4–0–2 | 18,730 | OTL |
| 12 | October 28, 2001 | 3–2 OT | Los Angeles Kings (2001–02) | 6–4–0–2 | 14,355 | W |
| 13 | October 30, 2001 | 2–5 | Detroit Red Wings (2001–02) | 6–5–0–2 | 18,730 | L |

November: 6–6–4–0 (home: 4–1–2–0; road: 2–5–2–0)

| Game | Date | Score | Opponent | Record | Attendance | Recap |
|---|---|---|---|---|---|---|
| 14 | November 1, 2001 | 3–4 | @ St. Louis Blues (2001–02) | 6–6–0–2 | 16,970 | L |
| 15 | November 2, 2001 | 3–2 | New York Rangers (2001–02) | 7–6–0–2 | 18,730 | W |
| 16 | November 4, 2001 | 1–0 OT | Phoenix Coyotes (2001–02) | 8–6–0–2 | 12,599 | W |
| 17 | November 6, 2001 | 2–2 OT | Pittsburgh Penguins (2001–02) | 8–6–1–2 | 15,938 | T |
| 18 | November 8, 2001 | 3–2 | @ Washington Capitals (2001–02) | 9–6–1–2 | 15,372 | W |
| 19 | November 9, 2001 | 3–2 | San Jose Sharks (2001–02) | 10–6–1–2 | 17,387 | W |
| 20 | November 11, 2001 | 1–1 OT | Edmonton Oilers (2001–02) | 10–6–2–2 | 12,390 | T |
| 21 | November 13, 2001 | 3–4 | @ Detroit Red Wings (2001–02) | 10–7–2–2 | 20,058 | L |
| 22 | November 15, 2001 | 1–1 OT | @ Ottawa Senators (2001–02) | 10–7–3–2 | 14,117 | T |
| 23 | November 17, 2001 | 0–2 | @ Tampa Bay Lightning (2001–02) | 10–8–3–2 | 19,758 | L |
| 24 | November 19, 2001 | 5–2 | Columbus Blue Jackets (2001–02) | 11–8–3–2 | 12,479 | W |
| 25 | November 21, 2001 | 4–4 OT | @ Dallas Stars (2001–02) | 11–8–4–2 | 18,532 | T |
| 26 | November 25, 2001 | 0–4 | Tampa Bay Lightning (2001–02) | 11–9–4–2 | 13,561 | L |
| 27 | November 27, 2001 | 5–2 | @ Toronto Maple Leafs (2001–02) | 12–9–4–2 | 19,258 | W |
| 28 | November 29, 2001 | 0–5 | @ New York Rangers (2001–02) | 12–10–4–2 | 17,542 | L |
| 29 | November 30, 2001 | 2–6 | @ Washington Capitals (2001–02) | 12–11–4–2 | 17,372 | L |

December: 8–2–1–3 (home: 3–2–0–1; road: 5–0–1–2)

| Game | Date | Score | Opponent | Record | Attendance | Recap |
|---|---|---|---|---|---|---|
| 30 | December 2, 2001 | 3–4 OT | Washington Capitals (2001–02) | 12–11–4–3 | 18,730 | OTL |
| 31 | December 4, 2001 | 2–4 | Buffalo Sabres (2001–02) | 12–12–4–3 | 11,838 | L |
| 32 | December 8, 2001 | 3–2 | @ Florida Panthers (2001–02) | 13–12–4–3 | 15,774 | W |
| 33 | December 10, 2001 | 4–3 OT | @ New York Rangers (2001–02) | 14–12–4–3 | 17,554 | W |
| 34 | December 12, 2001 | 4–1 | Florida Panthers (2001–02) | 15–12–4–3 | 10,281 | W |
| 35 | December 14, 2001 | 2–3 OT | @ Buffalo Sabres (2001–02) | 15–12–4–4 | 15,787 | OTL |
| 36 | December 16, 2001 | 7–0 | @ Pittsburgh Penguins (2001–02) | 16–12–4–4 | 14,226 | W |
| 37 | December 18, 2001 | 1–5 | Ottawa Senators (2001–02) | 16–13–4–4 | 11,166 | L |
| 38 | December 21, 2001 | 5–4 OT | Atlanta Thrashers (2001–02) | 17–13–4–4 | 17,288 | W |
| 39 | December 22, 2001 | 3–4 OT | @ Philadelphia Flyers (2001–02) | 17–13–4–5 | 19,685 | OTL |
| 40 | December 26, 2001 | 4–3 | Toronto Maple Leafs (2001–02) | 18–13–4–5 | 18,730 | W |
| 41 | December 27, 2001 | 3–2 | @ Tampa Bay Lightning (2001–02) | 19–13–4–5 | 16,413 | W |
| 42 | December 30, 2001 | 5–5 OT | @ Washington Capitals (2001–02) | 19–13–5–5 | 18,672 | T |
| 43 | December 31, 2001 | 5–4 | @ Buffalo Sabres (2001–02) | 20–13–5–5 | 18,173 | W |

January: 3–6–5–0 (home: 1–4–4–0; road: 2–2–1–0)

| Game | Date | Score | Opponent | Record | Attendance | Recap |
|---|---|---|---|---|---|---|
| 44 | January 2, 2002 | 3–6 | Boston Bruins (2001–02) | 20–14–5–5 | 12,404 | L |
| 45 | January 5, 2002 | 1–2 | New Jersey Devils (2001–02) | 20–15–5–5 | 18,730 | L |
| 46 | January 6, 2002 | 3–4 | Philadelphia Flyers (2001–02) | 20–16–5–5 | 18,730 | L |
| 47 | January 10, 2002 | 4–1 | @ Edmonton Oilers (2001–02) | 21–16–5–5 | 16,322 | W |
| 48 | January 12, 2002 | 1–7 | @ Vancouver Canucks (2001–02) | 21–17–5–5 | 18,422 | L |
| 49 | January 15, 2002 | 2–0 | Minnesota Wild (2001–02) | 22–17–5–5 | 10,712 | W |
| 50 | January 17, 2002 | 1–1 OT | Montreal Canadiens (2001–02) | 22–17–6–5 | 16,589 | T |
| 51 | January 19, 2002 | 3–3 OT | @ New Jersey Devils (2001–02) | 22–17–7–5 | 19,040 | T |
| 52 | January 21, 2002 | 5–7 | Vancouver Canucks (2001–02) | 22–18–7–5 | 10,526 | L |
| 53 | January 23, 2002 | 2–2 OT | Nashville Predators (2001–02) | 22–18–8–5 | 11,129 | T |
| 54 | January 25, 2002 | 1–1 OT | Florida Panthers (2001–02) | 22–18–9–5 | 18,730 | T |
| 55 | January 26, 2002 | 2–4 | @ Philadelphia Flyers (2001–02) | 22–19–9–5 | 19,747 | L |
| 56 | January 29, 2002 | 2–2 OT | Buffalo Sabres (2001–02) | 22–19–10–5 | 18,730 | T |
| 57 | January 30, 2002 | 3–1 | @ Tampa Bay Lightning (2001–02) | 23–19–10–5 | 13,234 | W |

February: 2–3–1–0 (home: 0–0–1–0; road: 2–3–0–0)

| Game | Date | Score | Opponent | Record | Attendance | Recap |
|---|---|---|---|---|---|---|
| 58 | February 5, 2002 | 3–3 OT | Pittsburgh Penguins (2001–02) | 23–19–11–5 | 18,730 | T |
| 59 | February 7, 2002 | 1–2 | @ Los Angeles Kings (2001–02) | 23–20–11–5 | 15,960 | L |
| 60 | February 8, 2002 | 4–1 | @ Mighty Ducks of Anaheim (2001–02) | 24–20–11–5 | 10,589 | W |
| 61 | February 10, 2002 | 0–4 | @ San Jose Sharks (2001–02) | 24–21–11–5 | 17,486 | L |
| 62 | February 26, 2002 | 1–4 | @ Toronto Maple Leafs (2001–02) | 24–22–11–5 | 19,359 | L |
| 63 | February 28, 2002 | 6–2 | @ Boston Bruins (2001–02) | 25–22–11–5 | 16,850 | W |

March: 7–2–3–0 (home: 2–1–3–0; road: 5–1–0–0)

| Game | Date | Score | Opponent | Record | Attendance | Recap |
|---|---|---|---|---|---|---|
| 64 | March 2, 2002 | 4–3 | @ Montreal Canadiens (2001–02) | 26–22–11–5 | 21,204 | W |
| 65 | March 5, 2002 | 2–1 OT | @ Chicago Blackhawks (2001–02) | 27–22–11–5 | 13,255 | W |
| 66 | March 7, 2002 | 3–1 | @ Pittsburgh Penguins (2001–02) | 28–22–11–5 | 15,111 | W |
| 67 | March 8, 2002 | 2–2 OT | Washington Capitals (2001–02) | 28–22–12–5 | 18,730 | T |
| 68 | March 11, 2002 | 3–3 OT | Calgary Flames (2001–02) | 28–22–13–5 | 12,665 | T |
| 69 | March 16, 2002 | 2–3 | @ Montreal Canadiens (2001–02) | 28–23–13–5 | 21,273 | L |
| 70 | March 18, 2002 | 1–1 OT | Montreal Canadiens (2001–02) | 28–23–14–5 | 16,472 | T |
| 71 | March 21, 2002 | 3–2 | Florida Panthers (2001–02) | 29–23–14–5 | 15,088 | W |
| 72 | March 23, 2002 | 4–2 | @ New Jersey Devils (2001–02) | 30–23–14–5 | 18,099 | W |
| 73 | March 26, 2002 | 2–3 | Boston Bruins (2001–02) | 30–24–14–5 | 18,005 | L |
| 74 | March 28, 2002 | 4–1 | Philadelphia Flyers (2001–02) | 31–24–14–5 | 18,730 | W |
| 75 | March 30, 2002 | 2–0 | @ Boston Bruins (2001–02) | 32–24–14–5 | 17,565 | W |

April: 3–2–2–0 (home: 1–1–1–0; road: 2–1–1–0)

| Game | Date | Score | Opponent | Record | Attendance | Recap |
|---|---|---|---|---|---|---|
| 76 | April 2, 2002 | 3–4 | @ Ottawa Senators (2001–02) | 32–25–14–5 | 16,371 | L |
| 77 | April 3, 2002 | 2–3 | New Jersey Devils (2001–02) | 32–26–14–5 | 16,587 | L |
| 78 | April 7, 2002 | 1–1 OT | Atlanta Thrashers (2001–02) | 32–26–15–5 | 18,730 | T |
| 79 | April 8, 2002 | 2–1 | @ New York Islanders (2001–02) | 33–26–15–5 | 13,729 | W |
| 80 | April 10, 2002 | 4–2 | Tampa Bay Lightning (2001–02) | 34–26–15–5 | 18,210 | W |
| 81 | April 12, 2002 | 3–1 | @ Florida Panthers (2001–02) | 35–26–15–5 | 19,250 | W |
| 82 | April 14, 2002 | 2–2 OT | @ Atlanta Thrashers (2001–02) | 35–26–16–5 | 18,545 | T |

Legend: W Win (2 points) L Loss (0 points) T Tie (1 point) OTL Overtime loss (1 point)

=== Playoffs ===
2002 Stanley Cup playoffs
Eastern Conference Quarterfinals vs. (6) New Jersey Devils – Hurricanes win 4–2

| Game | Date | Score | Opponent | Series | Recap |
|---|---|---|---|---|---|
| 1 | April 17, 2002 | 2–1 | New Jersey Devils | Hurricanes lead 1–0 | W |
| 2 | April 19, 2002 | 2–1 OT | New Jersey Devils | Hurricanes lead 2–0 | W |
| 3 | April 21, 2002 | 0–4 | @ New Jersey Devils | Hurricanes lead 2–1 | L |
| 4 | April 23, 2002 | 1–3 | @ New Jersey Devils | Series tied 2–2 | L |
| 5 | April 24, 2002 | 3–2 OT | New Jersey Devils | Hurricanes lead 3–2 | W |
| 6 | April 27, 2002 | 1–0 | @ New Jersey Devils | Hurricanes win 4–2 | W |

Eastern Conference Semifinals vs. (8) Montreal Canadiens – Hurricanes win 4–2

| Game | Date | Score | Opponent | Series | Recap |
|---|---|---|---|---|---|
| 1 | May 3, 2002 | 2–0 | Montreal Canadiens | Hurricanes lead 1–0 | W |
| 2 | May 5, 2002 | 1–4 | Montreal Canadiens | Series tied 1–1 | L |
| 3 | May 7, 2002 | 1–2 OT | @ Montreal Canadiens | Canadiens lead 2–1 | L |
| 4 | May 9, 2002 | 4–3 OT | @ Montreal Canadiens | Series tied 2–2 | W |
| 5 | May 12, 2002 | 5–1 | Montreal Canadiens | Hurricanes lead 3–2 | W |
| 6 | May 13, 2002 | 8–2 | @ Montreal Canadiens | Hurricanes win 4–2 | W |

Eastern Conference Finals vs. (4) Toronto Maple Leafs - Hurricanes win 4–2

| Game | Date | Score | Opponent | Series | Recap |
|---|---|---|---|---|---|
| 1 | May 16, 2002 | 1–2 | Toronto Maple Leafs | Maple Leafs lead 1–0 | L |
| 2 | May 19, 2002 | 2–1 OT | Toronto Maple Leafs | Series tied 1–1 | W |
| 3 | May 21, 2002 | 2–1 OT | @ Toronto Maple Leafs | Hurricanes lead 2–1 | W |
| 4 | May 23, 2002 | 3–0 | @ Toronto Maple Leafs | Hurricanes lead 3–1 | W |
| 5 | May 25, 2002 | 0–1 | Toronto Maple Leafs | Hurricanes lead 3-2 | L |
| 6 | May 28, 2002 | 2–1 OT | @ Toronto Maple Leafs | Hurricanes win 4–2 | W |

Stanley Cup Final vs. (W1) Detroit Red Wings – Red Wings win 4–1

| Game | Date | Score | Opponent | Series | Recap |
|---|---|---|---|---|---|
| 1 | June 4, 2002 | 3–2 OT | @ Detroit Red Wings | Hurricanes lead 1–0 | W |
| 2 | June 6, 2002 | 1–3 | @ Detroit Red Wings | Series tied 1–1 | L |
| 3 | June 8, 2002 | 2–3 3OT | Detroit Red Wings | Red Wings lead 2–1 | L |
| 4 | June 10, 2002 | 0–3 | Detroit Red Wings | Red Wings lead 3–1 | L |
| 5 | June 13, 2002 | 1–3 | @ Detroit Red Wings | Red Wings win 4–1 | L |

Legend: W Win L Loss

== Player statistics ==
=== Scoring ===
- Position abbreviations: C = Center; D = Defense; G = Goaltender; LW = Left wing; RW = Right wing
- † = Joined team via a transaction (e.g., trade, waivers, signing) during the season. Stats reflect time with the Hurricanes only.
- ‡ = Left team via a transaction (e.g., trade, waivers, release) during the season. Stats reflect time with the Hurricanes only.

| No. | Player | Pos | Regular season | | | | | | Playoffs | | | | | |
| No. | Player | Pos | GP | G | A | Pts | +/- | PIM | GP | G | A | Pts | +/- | PIM |
|---|---|---|---|---|---|---|---|---|---|---|---|---|---|---|
| 10 | Ron Francis | C | 80 | 27 | 50 | 77 | 4 | 18 | 23 | 6 | 10 | 16 | −2 | 6 |
| 24 | Sami Kapanen | RW | 77 | 27 | 42 | 69 | 9 | 23 | 23 | 1 | 8 | 9 | −2 | 6 |
| 92 | Jeff O'Neill | LW | 76 | 31 | 33 | 64 | −5 | 63 | 22 | 8 | 5 | 13 | 2 | 27 |
| 17 | Rod Brind'Amour | C | 81 | 23 | 32 | 55 | 3 | 40 | 23 | 4 | 8 | 12 | −3 | 16 |
| 13 | Bates Battaglia | LW | 82 | 21 | 25 | 46 | −6 | 44 | 23 | 5 | 9 | 14 | 2 | 14 |
| 26 | Erik Cole | RW | 81 | 16 | 24 | 40 | −10 | 35 | 23 | 6 | 3 | 9 | −2 | 30 |
| 63 | Josef Vasicek | C | 78 | 14 | 17 | 31 | −7 | 53 | 23 | 3 | 2 | 5 | 6 | 12 |
| 22 | Sean Hill† | D | 49 | 7 | 23 | 30 | −1 | 61 | 23 | 4 | 4 | 8 | 0 | 20 |
| 23 | Martin Gelinas | LW | 72 | 13 | 16 | 19 | −1 | 30 | 23 | 3 | 4 | 7 | 6 | 10 |
| 5 | Marek Malik | D | 82 | 4 | 19 | 23 | 8 | 88 | 23 | 0 | 3 | 3 | 3 | 18 |
| 8 | Sandis Ozolinsh‡ | D | 46 | 4 | 19 | 23 | −4 | 34 | — | — | — | — | — | — |
| 2 | Glen Wesley | D | 77 | 5 | 13 | 18 | −8 | 56 | 22 | 0 | 2 | 2 | 0 | 12 |
| 25 | Shane Willis‡ | RW | 59 | 7 | 10 | 17 | −8 | 24 | — | — | — | — | — | — |
| 45 | David Tanabe | D | 78 | 1 | 15 | 16 | −13 | 35 | 1 | 0 | 1 | 1 | 0 | 0 |
| 4 | Aaron Ward | D | 79 | 3 | 11 | 14 | 0 | 74 | 23 | 1 | 1 | 2 | 0 | 22 |
| 6 | Bret Hedican† | D | 26 | 2 | 4 | 6 | 3 | 10 | 23 | 1 | 4 | 5 | 0 | 20 |
| 11 | Jeff Daniels | C | 65 | 4 | 1 | 5 | −6 | 12 | 23 | 0 | 1 | 1 | −1 | 0 |
| 15 | Kevyn Adams† | C | 33 | 2 | 3 | 5 | −2 | 15 | 23 | 1 | 0 | 1 | −1 | 4 |
| 62 | Jaroslav Svoboda | LW | 10 | 2 | 2 | 4 | 0 | 2 | 23 | 1 | 4 | 5 | 2 | 28 |
| 20 | Darren Langdon | LW | 58 | 2 | 1 | 3 | 2 | 106 | — | — | — | — | — | — |
| 7 | Niclas Wallin | D | 52 | 1 | 2 | 3 | 1 | 36 | 23 | 2 | 1 | 3 | 4 | 12 |
| 12 | Craig MacDonald | C | 12 | 1 | 1 | 2 | −1 | 0 | 4 | 0 | 0 | 0 | −1 | 2 |
| 16 | Tommy Westlund | RW | 40 | 0 | 2 | 2 | −8 | 6 | 19 | 1 | 0 | 1 | 2 | 0 |
| 27 | Craig Adams | RW | 33 | 0 | 1 | 1 | 2 | 38 | 1 | 0 | 0 | 0 | 0 | 0 |
| 19 | Chris Dingman‡ | LW | 30 | 0 | 1 | 1 | −2 | 77 | — | — | — | — | — | — |
| 14 | Steven Halko‡ | D | 5 | 0 | 1 | 1 | 3 | 6 | — | — | — | — | — | — |
| 1 | Artus Irbe | G | 51 | 0 | 1 | 1 | | 10 | 18 | 0 | 0 | 0 | | 0 |
| 35 | Tom Barrasso‡ | G | 34 | 0 | 0 | 0 | | 4 | — | — | — | — | — | — |
| 21 | Josh Holden‡ | C | 8 | 0 | 0 | 0 | 0 | 2 | — | — | — | — | — | — |
| 15 | Byron Ritchie‡ | C | 4 | 0 | 0 | 0 | 0 | 2 | — | — | — | — | — | — |
| 48 | Nikos Tselios | D | 2 | 0 | 0 | 0 | −2 | 6 | — | — | — | — | — | — |
| 80 | Kevin Weekes† | G | 2 | 0 | 0 | 0 | | 0 | 8 | 0 | 0 | 0 | | 0 |

=== Goaltending ===
- † = Joined team via a transaction (e.g., trade, waivers, signing) during the season. Stats reflect time with the Hurricanes only.
- ‡ = Left team via a transaction (e.g., trade, waivers, release) during the season. Stats reflect time with the Hurricanes only.

| No. | Player | Regular season | | | | | | | | | | Playoffs | | | | | | | | |
| No. | Player | GP | W | L | T | SA | GA | GAA | SV% | SO | TOI | GP | W | L | SA | GA | GAA | SV% | SO | TOI |
|---|---|---|---|---|---|---|---|---|---|---|---|---|---|---|---|---|---|---|---|---|
| 1 | Arturs Irbe | 51 | 20 | 19 | 11 | 1282 | 126 | 2.54 | .902 | 3 | 2974 | 18 | 10 | 8 | 480 | 30 | 1.67 | .938 | 1 | 1078 |
| 35 | Tom Barrasso‡ | 34 | 13 | 12 | 5 | 886 | 83 | 2.61 | .906 | 2 | 1908 | — | — | — | — | — | — | — | — | — |
| 80 | Kevin Weekes† | 2 | 2 | 0 | 0 | 41 | 3 | 1.50 | .927 | 0 | 120 | 8 | 3 | 2 | 180 | 11 | 1.62 | .939 | 2 | 408 |

== Awards and honors ==
=== Awards ===
| Type | Award/honor | Recipient | Ref |
|---|---|---|---|
| League (annual) | King Clancy Memorial Trophy | Ron Francis | |
| League (annual) | Lady Byng Memorial Trophy | Ron Francis | |
| League (in-season) | NHL All-Star Game selection | Sami Kapanen | |
| League (in-season) | NHL Player of the Week | Tom Barrasso (December 17) | |
| League (in-season) | NHL Player of the Week | Ron Francis (January 7) | |
| League (in-season) | NHL YoungStars Game selection | David Tanabe | |
| Team | Good Guy Award | Arturs Irbe | |
| Team | Most Valuable Player | Ron Francis | |
| Team | Steve Chiasson Award | Ron Francis | |

=== Milestones ===
| Milestone | Player | Date | Ref |
|---|---|---|---|
| First game | Erik Cole | October 5, 2001 | |
| First game | Jaroslav Svoboda | March 11, 2002 | |
| First game | Nikos Tselios | April 12, 2002 | |
| 500th game | Arturs Irbe | January 23, 2002 | |

== Transactions ==
The Hurricanes were involved in the following transactions from June 10, 2001, the day after the deciding game of the 2001 Stanley Cup Final, through June 13, 2002, the day of the deciding game of the 2002 Stanley Cup Final.

=== Trades ===
| Date | Details | | Ref |
|---|---|---|---|
| June 24, 2001 | To Carolina Hurricanes: Nashville’s 4th-round pick in 2001 | To Philadelphia Flyers: 3rd-round pick in 2002 | |
| June 24, 2001 | To Carolina Hurricanes: Chris Dingman | To Colorado Avalanche: 5th-round pick in 2001 | |
| July 9, 2001 | To Carolina Hurricanes: Aaron Ward | To Detroit Red Wings: 2nd-round pick in 2002 | |
| December 5, 2001 | To Carolina Hurricanes: Sean Hill | To St. Louis Blues: Steven Halko; 4th-round pick in 2002 | |
| December 28, 2001 | To Carolina Hurricanes: Kaspars Astashenko | To Tampa Bay Lightning: Harlan Pratt | |
| January 16, 2002 | To Carolina Hurricanes: Kevyn Adams; Bret Hedican; Rights to Tomas Malec; Conditional 2nd-round pick in 2003 | To Florida Panthers: Sandis Ozolinsh; Byron Ritchie | |
| February 13, 2002 | To Carolina Hurricanes: Jesse Boulerice | To Philadelphia Flyers: Greg Koehler | |
| March 4, 2002 | To Carolina Hurricanes: Ted Drury | To New Jersey Devils: Mike Rucinski | |
| March 5, 2002 | To Carolina Hurricanes: Kevin Weekes | To Tampa Bay Lightning: Chris Dingman; Shane Willis | |
| March 15, 2002 | To Carolina Hurricanes: 4th-round pick in 2003 | To Toronto Maple Leafs: Tom Barrasso | |

=== Players acquired ===
| Date | Player | Former team | Term | Via | Ref |
|---|---|---|---|---|---|
| July 17, 2001 | Tom Barrasso | Ottawa Senators | 1-year | Free agency | |
| September 28, 2001 | Josh Holden | Vancouver Canucks | | Waiver draft | |

=== Players lost ===
| Date | Player | New team | Via (Note: In parentheses is the player's free agency group on July 1 if applicable.) | Ref |
|---|---|---|---|---|
| July 1, 2001 | Rob DiMaio | Dallas Stars | Free agency (III) | |
| July 1, 2001 | Kevin Hatcher (Note: Hatcher retired.) | | Contract expiration (III) | |
| July 1, 2001 | Dave Karpa | New York Rangers | Free agency (V) | |
| July 1, 2001 | Jon Rohloff (Note: Rohloff retired.) | | Contract expiration (UFA) | |
| July 26, 2001 | Scott Pellerin | Boston Bruins | Free agency (III) | |
| September 6, 2001 | Marc Magliarditi | Houston Aeros (AHL) | Free agency (UFA) | |
| N/A | Mark McMahon | Toledo Storm (ECHL) | Free agency (UFA) | |
| October 25, 2001 | Josh Holden | Vancouver Canucks | Waivers | |

=== Signings ===
| Date | Player | Term | Contract type | Ref |
|---|---|---|---|---|
| July 11, 2001 | Chris Dingman | 1-year | Re-signing | |
| July 15, 2001 | Igor Knyazev | 3-year | Entry-level | |
| July 23, 2001 | Shane Willis | 1-year | Re-signing | |
| July 27, 2001 | Bates Battaglia | 2-year | Re-signing | |
| July 30, 2001 | Aaron Ward | 1-year | Re-signing | |
| July 31, 2001 | Craig Adams | 2-year | Re-signing | |
| July 31, 2001 | Rod Brind'Amour | 1-year | Re-signing | |
| August 1, 2001 | Marek Malik | 2-year | Re-signing | |
| August 2, 2001 | Craig MacDonald | 1-year | Re-signing | |
| August 2, 2001 | Jean-Marc Pelletier | 2-year | Re-signing | |
| August 2, 2001 | Byron Ritchie | 1-year | Re-signing | |
| August 3, 2001 | Greg Kuznik | 1-year | Re-signing | |
| August 3, 2001 | Jeremiah McCarthy | 1-year | Re-signing | |
| August 3, 2001 | Randy Petruk | 1-year | Re-signing | |
| August 14, 2001 | Jeff Daniels | 1-year | Re-signing | |
| August 30, 2001 | Tomas Kurka | 3-year | Entry-level | |
| September 6, 2001 | Rod Brind'Amour | 5-year (Note: Option for a sixth year.) | Extension | |
| October 4, 2001 | Ryan Murphy | multi-year | Entry-level | |
| October 4, 2001 | Rob Zepp | multi-year | Entry-level | |
| October 4, 2001 | Michael Zigomanis | 3-year | Entry-level | |
| October 5, 2001 | Arturs Irbe | 3-year | Extension | |
| October 26, 2001 | Peter Reynolds | 3-year | Entry-level | |
| March 20, 2002 | Craig MacDonald | 1-year | Extension | |
| March 20, 2002 | Ryan Bayda | 3-year | Entry-level | |
| April 12, 2002 | Tomas Malec | 3-year | Entry-level | |
| April 24, 2002 | Jared Newman | 3-year | Entry-level | |

== Draft picks ==
Carolina's picks at the 2001 NHL entry draft in Sunrise, Florida. The Hurricanes have the 15th overall pick.

| Round | # | Player | Position | Nationality | College/Junior/Club team |
|---|---|---|---|---|---|
| 1 | 15 | Igor Knyazev | Defense | Russia | Spartak Moscow (Russia) |
| 2 | 46 | Michael Zigomanis | Center | Canada | Kingston Frontenacs (OHL) |
| 3 | 91 | Kevin Estrada | Left wing | Canada | Chilliwack (BCHL) |
| 4 | 110 | Rob Zepp | Goaltender | Canada | Plymouth Whalers (OHL) |
| 6 | 181 | Daniel Boisclair | Goaltender | Canada | Cape Breton Screaming Eagles (QMJHL) |
| 7 | 211 | Sean Curry | Defense | United States | Tri-City Americans (WHL) |
| 8 | 244 | Carter Trevisani | Defense | Canada | Ottawa 67's (OHL) |
| 9 | 274 | Peter Reynolds | Defense | Canada | North Bay Centennials (OHL) |

== Farm teams ==
=== American Hockey League ===
The Lowell Lock Monsters were the Hurricanes American Hockey League affiliate for the 2001–02 AHL season.

=== East Coast Hockey League ===
The Florida Everblades were the Hurricanes East Coast Hockey League affiliate.
