= 2001–02 Tampa Bay Lightning season =

National Hockey League team season

2001–02 Tampa Bay Lightning
- Division: 3rd Southeast
- Conference: 13th Eastern
- 2001–02 record: 27–40–11–4
- Home record: 16–17–5–3
- Road record: 11–23–6–1
- Goals for: 178
- Goals against: 219

Team information
- General manager: Rick Dudley (Oct.–Feb.); Jay Feaster (Feb.–Apr.)
- Coach: John Tortorella
- Captain: Vacant
- Alternate captains: Vincent Lecavalier; Fredrik Modin; Tim Taylor
- Arena: Ice Palace
- Average attendance: 15,722
- Minor league affiliates: Springfield Falcons; Pensacola Ice Pilots

Team leaders
- Goals: Dave Andreychuk (21)
- Assists: Brad Richards (42)
- Points: Brad Richards (62)
- Penalty minutes: Dave Andreychuk (109)
- Plus/minus: Martin St. Louis (+4)
- Wins: Nikolai Khabibulin (24)
- Goals against average: Nikolai Khabibulin (2.36)

The 2001–02 Tampa Bay Lightning season was the franchise's tenth season of operation in the National Hockey League (NHL). The Lightning failed to qualify for the playoffs for the sixth consecutive year for the first time in franchise history.

== Regular season ==
On February 10, general manager Rick Dudley resigned and was replaced by assistant general manager Jay Feaster.

=== Final standings ===
Southeast Division
No.	CR		GP	W	L	T	OTL	GF	GA	Pts
1	3	**Carolina Hurricanes**	82	35	26	16	5	217	217	91
2	9	Washington Capitals	82	36	33	11	2	228	240	85
3	13	Tampa Bay Lightning	82	27	40	11	4	178	219	69
4	14	Florida Panthers	82	22	44	10	6	180	250	60
5	15	Atlanta Thrashers	82	19	47	11	5	187	288	54

Note: CR = Conference rank; GP = Games played; W = Wins; L = Losses; T = Ties; OTL = Overtime loss; GF = Goals for; GA = Goals against; Pts = Points
Bolded teams qualified for the playoffs.

Eastern Conference
R		Div	GP	W	L	T	OTL	GF	GA	Pts
**1**	**Z-** Boston Bruins	**NE**	**82**	**43**	**24**	**6**	**9**	**236**	**201**	101
**2**	**Y-** Philadelphia Flyers	**AT**	**82**	**42**	**27**	**10**	**3**	**234**	**192**	97
**3**	**Y-** Carolina Hurricanes	**SE**	**82**	**35**	**26**	**16**	**5**	**217**	**217**	91
**4**	**X-** Toronto Maple Leafs	**NE**	**82**	**43**	**25**	**10**	**4**	**249**	**207**	100
**5**	**X-** New York Islanders	**AT**	**82**	**42**	**28**	**8**	**4**	**239**	**220**	96
**6**	**X-** New Jersey Devils	**AT**	**82**	**41**	**28**	**9**	**4**	**205**	**187**	95
**7**	**X-** Ottawa Senators	**NE**	**82**	**39**	**27**	**9**	**7**	**243**	**208**	94
**8**	**X-** Montreal Canadiens	**NE**	**82**	**36**	**31**	**12**	**3**	**207**	**209**	87
8.5
9	Washington Capitals	SE	82	36	33	11	2	228	240	85
10	Buffalo Sabres	NE	82	35	35	11	1	213	200	82
11	New York Rangers	AT	82	36	38	4	4	227	258	80
12	Pittsburgh Penguins	AT	82	28	41	8	5	198	249	69
13	Tampa Bay Lightning	SE	82	27	40	11	4	178	219	69
14	Florida Panthers	SE	82	22	44	10	6	180	250	60
15	Atlanta Thrashers	SE	82	19	47	11	5	187	288	54

Divisions: AT – Atlantic, NE – Northeast, SE – Southeast

Z – Clinched conference; Y – Clinched division; X – Clinched playoff spot

== Schedule and results ==
2001–02 regular season
October: 4–6–1–0 (home: 2–2–1–0; road: 2–4–0–0)

Game	Date	Score	Opponent	Record	Recap
1	October 5, 2001	2–3	New York Islanders (2001–02)	0–1–0–0	L
2	October 7, 2001	0–5	Florida Panthers (2001–02)	0–2–0–0	L
3	October 11, 2001	3–4	@ San Jose Sharks (2001–02)	0–3–0–0	L
4	October 13, 2001	1–0	@ Los Angeles Kings (2001–02)	1–3–0–0	W
5	October 14, 2001	3–2	@ Mighty Ducks of Anaheim (2001–02)	2–3–0–0	W
6	October 16, 2001	1–2	@ Colorado Avalanche (2001–02)	2–4–0–0	L
7	October 20, 2001	5–2	New York Rangers (2001–02)	3–4–0–0	W
8	October 23, 2001	1–1 OT	Washington Capitals (2001–02)	3–4–1–0	T
9	October 25, 2001	3–0	Los Angeles Kings (2001–02)	4–4–1–0	W
10	October 27, 2001	3–4	@ Atlanta Thrashers (2001–02)	4–5–1–0	L
11	October 30, 2001	2–3	@ Toronto Maple Leafs (2001–02)	4–6–1–0	L

November: 6–6–0–1 (home: 5–2–0–0; road: 1–4–0–1)

Game	Date	Score	Opponent	Record	Recap
12	November 2, 2001	1–4	@ Buffalo Sabres (2001–02)	4–7–1–0	L
13	November 3, 2001	1–2 OT	@ Pittsburgh Penguins (2001–02)	4–7–1–1	OTL
14	November 6, 2001	0–3	@ New York Islanders (2001–02)	4–8–1–1	L
15	November 8, 2001	1–2	Philadelphia Flyers (2001–02)	4–9–1–1	L
16	November 10, 2001	3–2 OT	Pittsburgh Penguins (2001–02)	5–9–1–1	W
17	November 15, 2001	2–3	Toronto Maple Leafs (2001–02)	5–10–1–1	L
18	November 17, 2001	2–0	Carolina Hurricanes (2001–02)	6–10–1–1	W
19	November 20, 2001	3–2	Mighty Ducks of Anaheim (2001–02)	7–10–1–1	W
20	November 21, 2001	2–3	@ Washington Capitals (2001–02)	7–11–1–1	L
21	November 23, 2001	2–0	New Jersey Devils (2001–02)	8–11–1–1	W
22	November 25, 2001	4–0	@ Carolina Hurricanes (2001–02)	9–11–1–1	W
23	November 27, 2001	3–6	@ Boston Bruins (2001–02)	9–12–1–1	L
24	November 29, 2001	5–2	Atlanta Thrashers (2001–02)	10–12–1–1	W

December: 5–6–2–1 (home: 2–2–0–1; road: 3–4–2–0)

Game	Date	Score	Opponent	Record	Recap
25	December 1, 2001	0–2	@ Philadelphia Flyers (2001–02)	10–13–1–1	L
26	December 2, 2001	0–1	@ New York Rangers (2001–02)	10–14–1–1	L
27	December 4, 2001	1–1 OT	@ New Jersey Devils (2001–02)	10–14–2–1	T
28	December 6, 2001	1–0	Columbus Blue Jackets (2001–02)	11–14–2–1	W
29	December 8, 2001	2–5	@ Ottawa Senators (2001–02)	11–15–2–1	L
30	December 10, 2001	1–1 OT	@ Vancouver Canucks (2001–02)	11–15–3–1	T
31	December 12, 2001	3–1	@ Calgary Flames (2001–02)	12–15–3–1	W
32	December 14, 2001	1–2	@ Edmonton Oilers (2001–02)	12–16–3–1	L
33	December 17, 2001	4–3	@ Montreal Canadiens (2001–02)	13–16–3–1	W
34	December 21, 2001	4–3 OT	St. Louis Blues (2001–02)	14–16–3–1	W
35	December 26, 2001	1–0	@ Nashville Predators (2001–02)	15–16–3–1	W
36	December 27, 2001	2–3	Carolina Hurricanes (2001–02)	15–17–3–1	L
37	December 29, 2001	4–5 OT	Boston Bruins (2001–02)	15–17–3–2	OTL
38	December 31, 2001	1–4	Toronto Maple Leafs (2001–02)	15–18–3–2	L

January: 4–9–2–0 (home: 1–4–1–0; road: 3–5–1–0)

Game	Date	Score	Opponent	Record	Recap
39	January 2, 2002	0–2	@ Minnesota Wild (2001–02)	15–19–3–2	L
40	January 4, 2002	0–2	@ Chicago Blackhawks (2001–02)	15–20–3–2	L
41	January 6, 2002	3–0	@ Phoenix Coyotes (2001–02)	16–20–3–2	W
42	January 8, 2002	1–2	Dallas Stars (2001–02)	16–21–3–2	L
43	January 12, 2002	1–2	Ottawa Senators (2001–02)	16–22–3–2	L
44	January 13, 2002	2–2 OT	@ Atlanta Thrashers (2001–02)	16–22–4–2	T
45	January 15, 2002	5–4 OT	@ New Jersey Devils (2001–02)	17–22–4–2	W
46	January 18, 2002	2–2 OT	Chicago Blackhawks (2001–02)	17–22–5–2	T
47	January 19, 2002	1–5	Montreal Canadiens (2001–02)	17–23–5–2	L
48	January 21, 2002	3–2	New Jersey Devils (2001–02)	18–23–5–2	W
49	January 23, 2002	1–5	@ Pittsburgh Penguins (2001–02)	18–24–5–2	L
50	January 25, 2002	1–4	@ Buffalo Sabres (2001–02)	18–25–5–2	L
51	January 26, 2002	2–6	@ New York Islanders (2001–02)	18–26–5–2	L
52	January 28, 2002	1–0	@ New York Rangers (2001–02)	19–26–5–2	W
53	January 30, 2002	1–3	Carolina Hurricanes (2001–02)	19–27–5–2	L

February: 1–3–1–1 (home: 0–2–1–1; road: 1–1–0–0)

Game	Date	Score	Opponent	Record	Recap
54	February 4, 2002	4–4 OT	Ottawa Senators (2001–02)	19–27–6–2	T
55	February 6, 2002	3–2	@ Florida Panthers (2001–02)	20–27–6–2	W
56	February 7, 2002	1–3	Florida Panthers (2001–02)	20–28–6–2	L
57	February 9, 2002	2–4	Washington Capitals (2001–02)	20–29–6–2	L
58	February 11, 2002	1–3	@ Washington Capitals (2001–02)	20–30–6–2	L
59	February 26, 2002	3–4 OT	Detroit Red Wings (2001–02)	20–30–6–3	OTL

March: 5–5–4–1 (home: 5–2–2–1; road: 0–3–2–0)

Game	Date	Score	Opponent	Record	Recap
60	March 1, 2002	4–2	San Jose Sharks (2001–02)	21–30–6–3	W
61	March 2, 2002	3–2	Florida Panthers (2001–02)	22–30–6–3	W
62	March 6, 2002	2–3	Edmonton Oilers (2001–02)	22–31–6–3	L
63	March 8, 2002	2–4	Philadelphia Flyers (2001–02)	22–32–6–3	L
64	March 10, 2002	5–1	Nashville Predators (2001–02)	23–32–6–3	W
65	March 12, 2002	4–4 OT	@ Atlanta Thrashers (2001–02)	23–32–7–3	T
66	March 14, 2002	3–2	Calgary Flames (2001–02)	24–32–7–3	W
67	March 17, 2002	2–2 OT	Buffalo Sabres (2001–02)	24–32–8–3	T
68	March 18, 2002	3–3 OT	@ Philadelphia Flyers (2001–02)	24–32–9–3	T
69	March 20, 2002	4–2	Atlanta Thrashers (2001–02)	25–32–9–3	W
70	March 22, 2002	3–3 OT	Montreal Canadiens (2001–02)	25–32–10–3	T
71	March 24, 2002	3–4 OT	Boston Bruins (2001–02)	25–32–10–4	OTL
72	March 26, 2002	2–7	@ Toronto Maple Leafs (2001–02)	25–33–10–4	L
73	March 28, 2002	1–2	@ Montreal Canadiens (2001–02)	25–34–10–4	L
74	March 30, 2002	1–3	@ Ottawa Senators (2001–02)	25–35–10–4	L

April: 2–5–1–0 (home: 1–3–0–0; road: 1–2–1–0)

Game	Date	Score	Opponent	Record	Recap
75	April 1, 2002	4–6	New York Rangers (2001–02)	25–36–10–4	L
76	April 3, 2002	1–4	@ Washington Capitals (2001–02)	25–37–10–4	L
77	April 4, 2002	4–2	Pittsburgh Penguins (2001–02)	26–37–10–4	W
78	April 7, 2002	3–5	Buffalo Sabres (2001–02)	26–38–10–4	L
79	April 9, 2002	2–2 OT	@ Boston Bruins (2001–02)	26–38–11–4	T
80	April 10, 2002	2–4	@ Carolina Hurricanes (2001–02)	26–39–11–4	L
81	April 12, 2002	1–3	New York Islanders (2001–02)	26–40–11–4	L
82	April 14, 2002	3–2 OT	@ Florida Panthers (2001–02)	27–40–11–4	W

Legend: W Win (2 points) L Loss (0 points) T Tie (1 point) OTL Overtime loss (1 point)

== Player statistics ==
=== Scoring ===
- Position abbreviations: C = Center; D = Defense; G = Goaltender; LW = Left wing; RW = Right wing
- † = Joined team via a transaction (e.g., trade, waivers, signing) during the season. Stats reflect time with the Lightning only.
- ‡ = Left team via a transaction (e.g., trade, waivers, release) during the season. Stats reflect time with the Lightning only.

No.	Player	Pos	Regular season					
No.	Player	Pos	GP	G	A	Pts	+/-	PIM
19	Brad Richards	C	82	20	42	62	−18	13
20	Vaclav Prospal	C	81	18	37	55	−11	38
25	Dave Andreychuk	LW	82	21	17	38	−12	109
4	Vincent Lecavalier	C	76	20	17	37	−18	61
26	Martin St. Louis	RW	53	16	19	35	4	20
7	Ben Clymer	RW	81	14	20	34	−10	36
13	Pavel Kubina	D	82	11	23	34	−22	106
33	Fredrik Modin	LW	54	14	17	31	0	27
22 (Note: Boyle wore number 29 in his first game.)	Dan Boyle†	D	41	5	15	20	−15	27
41	Jimmie Olvestad	LW	74	3	11	14	3	24
28 (Note: Keefe wore number 42 in his first twelve games.)	Sheldon Keefe	RW	39	6	7	13	−11	16
5	Jassen Cullimore	D	78	4	9	13	−1	58
16	Juha Ylonen‡	C	65	3	10	13	−10	8
18	Zdeno Ciger†‡	LW	27	6	6	12	−12	10
21	Cory Sarich	D	72	0	11	11	−4	105
15	Nikita Alexeev	RW	44	4	4	8	−9	8
27	Tim Taylor	C	48	4	4	8	−2	25
2	Stan Neckar	D	77	1	7	8	−18	24
24 (Note: Willis wore number 14 in his first game.)	Shane Willis†	RW	21	4	3	7	0	6
46	Martin Cibak	C	26	1	5	6	−6	8
3	Grant Ledyard	D	53	1	3	4	−5	12
11	Chris Dingman†	LW	14	0	4	4	−8	26
9	Brian Holzinger	C	23	1	2	3	−4	4
44	Nolan Pratt	D	46	0	3	3	−4	51
36	Andre Roy†	RW	9	1	1	2	−5	63
34	Gordie Dwyer	LW	26	0	2	2	−4	60
35	Nikolai Khabibulin	G	70	0	2	2		6
30	Andrei Zyuzin‡	D	9	0	2	2	−6	6
29	Dmitry Afanasenkov	LW	5	0	0	0	−1	0
36	Matthew Barnaby‡	RW	29	0	0	0	−7	70
43	Mathieu Biron	D	36	0	0	0	−16	12
55	Josef Boumedienne†	D	3	0	0	0	−1	4
6	Sascha Goc†	D	9	0	0	0	0	0
31	Dieter Kochan	G	5	0	0	0		0
11	Kristian Kudroc	D	2	0	0	0	0	0
14	Glen Metropolit‡	C	2	0	0	0	−2	0
54	Gaetan Royer†	RW	3	0	0	0	−1	2
17 (Note: Tobler wore number 18 in his first game.)	Ryan Tobler	LW	4	0	0	0	−2	5
80	Kevin Weekes‡	G	19	0	0	0		0

=== Goaltending ===
- ‡ = Left team via a transaction (e.g., trade, waivers, release) during the season. Stats reflect time with the Lightning only.

No.	Player	Regular season									
No.	Player	GP	W	L	T	SA	GA	GAA	SV%	SO	TOI
35	Nikolai Khabibulin	70	24	32	10	1914	153	2.36	.920	7	3896
80	Kevin Weekes‡	19	3	9	0	470	40	2.89	.915	2	830
31	Dieter Kochan	5	0	3	1	129	16	4.05	.876	0	237

== Awards and records ==
=== Awards ===
Type	Award/honor	Recipient	Ref
League (in-season)	NHL All-Star Game selection	Nikolai Khabibulin	
League (in-season)	NHL Player of the Week	Nikolai Khabibulin (November 26)	
League (in-season)	NHL YoungStars Game selection	Brad Richards	

=== Milestones ===
Milestone	Player	Date	Ref
First game	Jimmie Olvestad	October 5, 2001	
First game	Nikita Alexeev	October 7, 2001	
First game	Ryan Tobler	October 7, 2001	
First game	Martin Cibak	February 9, 2002	
First game	Gaetan Royer	April 1, 2002	
25th shutout	Nikolai Khabibulin	November 25, 2001	
1,000th game played	Grant Ledyard	December 12, 2001	

== Transactions ==
The Lightning were involved in the following transactions from June 10, 2001, the day after the deciding game of the 2001 Stanley Cup Final, through June 13, 2002, the day of the deciding game of the 2002 Stanley Cup Final.

=== Trades ===
Date	Details		Ref
June 18, 2001	To Tampa Bay Lightning: Juha Ylonen	To Phoenix Coyotes: Todd Warriner	
June 22, 2001	To Tampa Bay Lightning: Mathieu Biron; 2nd-round pick in 2002	To New York Islanders: Adrian Aucoin; Alexander Kharitonov	
June 23, 2001	To Tampa Bay Lightning: New Jersey’s 2nd-round pick in 2001	To Washington Capitals: 2nd-round pick in 2002	
June 23, 2001	To Tampa Bay Lightning: New Jersey’s 3rd-round pick in 2001	To Ottawa Senators: 4th-round pick in 2001; Buffalo’s 7th-round pick in 2001	
June 24, 2001	To Tampa Bay Lightning: 4th-round pick in 2001; 5th-round pick in 2001; 7th-round pick in 2001	To Philadelphia Flyers: 3rd-round pick in 2002	
June 24, 2001	To Tampa Bay Lightning: 6th-round pick in 2001; Buffalo’s 6th-round pick in 2001	To Los Angeles Kings: Toronto’s 5th-round pick in 2001	
June 24, 2001	To Tampa Bay Lightning: Nolan Pratt	To Colorado Avalanche: Los Angeles’ 6th-round pick in 2001	
June 24, 2001	To Tampa Bay Lightning: 8th-round pick in 2001; 9th-round pick in 2002	To Philadelphia Flyers: 7th-round pick in 2002	
June 24, 2001	To Tampa Bay Lightning: 9th-round pick in 2001	To Colorado Avalanche: 9th-round pick in 2002	
June 30, 2001	To Tampa Bay Lightning: Tim Taylor (Note: The Rangers agreed to pay two-thirds of Taylor’s remaining salary on his contract.)	To New York Rangers: Nils Ekman; Kyle Freadrich	
July 10, 2001	To Tampa Bay Lightning: Vaclav Prospal	To Florida Panthers: Ryan Johnson; 6th-round pick in 2003	
November 9, 2001	To Tampa Bay Lightning: Josef Boumedienne; Sascha Goc; Rights to Anton But	To New Jersey Devils: Andrei Zyuzin	
December 12, 2001	To Tampa Bay Lightning: Zdeno Ciger	To New York Rangers: Matthew Barnaby	
December 28, 2001	To Tampa Bay Lightning: Harlan Pratt	To Carolina Hurricanes: Kaspars Astashenko	
January 7, 2002	To Tampa Bay Lightning: Dan Boyle	To Florida Panthers: 5th-round pick in 2003	
March 5, 2002	To Tampa Bay Lightning: Chris Dingman; Shane Willis	To Carolina Hurricanes: Kevin Weekes	
March 15, 2002	To Tampa Bay Lightning: Andre Roy; 6th-round pick in 2002	To Ottawa Senators: Juha Ylonen	

=== Players acquired ===
Date	Player	Former team	Term	Via	Ref
July 13, 2001	Dave Andreychuk	Buffalo Sabres		Free agency	
July 13, 2001	Grant Ledyard	Dallas Stars		Free agency	
August 21, 2001	Ryan Tobler	New York Rangers		Free agency	
September 28, 2001	Glen Metropolit	Washington Capitals		Waiver draft	
October 23, 2001	Gaetan Royer	Saint John Flames (AHL)		Free agency	
May 29, 2002	Kevin Hodson	Montreal Canadiens	1-year (Note: Club option for a second year.)	Free agency	

=== Players lost ===
Date	Player	New team	Via (Note: In parentheses is the player's free agency group on July 1 if applicable.)	Ref
July 1, 2001	Stan Drulia (Note: Drulia retired.)		Free agency (UFA)	
July 1, 2001	Dale Rominski (Note: Rominski retired.)		Free agency (UFA)	
August 2, 2001	Wade Flaherty	Florida Panthers	Free agency (III)	
August 2, 2001	Dan Kesa	Avangard Omsk (RSL)	Free agency (UFA)	
August 8, 2001	John Emmons	Boston Bruins	Free agency (VI)	
August 9, 2001	Mario Larocque	Buffalo Sabres	Free agency (UFA)	
August 12, 2001	Marek Posmyk	HC Zlin (ELH)	Free agency (II) (Note: Tampa Bay retained Posmyk’s NHL rights through the 2006–07 season.)	
August 24, 2001	Jason Podollan	New York Islanders	Free agency (VI)	
October 9, 2001	Konstantin Kalmikov	Louisiana IceGators (ECHL)	Free agency (UFA)	
October 20, 2001	Glen Metropolit	Washington Capitals	Waivers	
March 8, 2002	Zdeno Ciger		Release	
May 1, 2002	Petr Svoboda		Retirement	

=== Signings ===
Date	Player	Term	Contract type	Ref
July 9, 2001	Brian Holzinger	multi-year	Re-signing	
July 11, 2001	Kevin Weekes	multi-year	Re-signing	
July 12, 2001	Michal Lanicek	3-year	Entry-level	
July 12, 2001	Alexander Polukeyev	3-year	Entry-level	
July 12, 2001	Marek Priechodsky	3-year	Entry-level	
July 16, 2001	Jimmie Olvestad	3-year	Entry-level	
July 16, 2001	Stan Neckar	multi-year	Re-signing	
July 18, 2001	Nolan Pratt		Re-signing	
July 26, 2001	Gordie Dwyer		Re-signing	
July 31, 2001	Andrei Zyuzin	multi-year	Re-signing	
August 6, 2001	Mike Jones		Re-signing	
August 6, 2001	Cory Sarich		Re-signing	
August 21, 2001	Mikko Kuparinen		Re-signing	
October 5, 2001	Vincent Lecavalier	multi-year	Re-signing	
May 21, 2002	Nolan Pratt	1-year	Option exercised	
May 21, 2002	Martin St. Louis	multi-year	Extension	
May 29, 2002	Brian Eklund	2-year	Entry-level	
June 6, 2002	Ryan Tobler	1-year	Option exercised	

== Draft picks ==
Tampa Bay's draft picks at the 2001 NHL entry draft held at the National Car Rental Center in Sunrise, Florida.

Round	#	Player	Nationality	College/Junior/Club team (League)
1	3	Alexander Svitov	Russia	Avangard Omsk (Russia)
2	47	Alexander Polushin	Russia	THK Tver (Russia)
2	61	Andreas Holmqvist	Sweden	Hammarby IF (Sweden)
3	94	Evgeny Artyukhin	Russia	HC Podolsk (Russia)
4	123	Aaron Lobb	Canada	London Knights (OHL)
5	138	Paul Lynch	United States	Valley Jr. Warriors (EJHL)
6	188	Art Femenella	United States	Sioux City Musketeers (USHL)
7	219	Dennis Packard	United States	Harvard University (NCAA)
7	222	Jeremy Van Hoof	Canada	Ottawa 67's (OHL)
8	252	Jean-Francois Soucy	Canada	Montreal Rocket (QMJHL)
8	259	Dmitri Bezrukov	Russia	Neftekhimik Nizhnekamsk (Russia)
9	261	Vitali Smolyaninov	Kazakhstan	Neftekhimik Nizhnekamsk (Russia)
9	281	Ilya Solaryov	Kazakhstan	Molot-Prikamye Perm (Russia)
9	289	Henrik Bergfors	Sweden	Sodertalje SK Jr. (Sweden)

== See also ==
- 2001–02 NHL season
