= Nick Smith (ice hockey) =

Canadian ice hockey player (born 1979)

- Born: March 23, 1979 (age 47) Hamilton, Ontario, Canada
- Height: 6 ft 2 in (188 cm)
- Weight: 190 lb (86 kg; 13 st 8 lb)
- Position: Centre
- Shot: Left
- Played for: Florida Panthers; Trondheim Black Panthers; Bietigheim Steelers
- NHL draft: 74th overall, 1997; Florida Panthers
- Playing career: 1999–2007

Nick Smith (born March 23, 1979) is a Canadian former professional ice hockey center who played in the National Hockey League from Hamilton, Ontario. He played for the Florida Panthers during the 2001–02 season. He was selected by the Panthers during the 1997 NHL entry draft, in the 3rd round (74th overall).

== Career statistics ==
			Regular season					Playoffs
Season	Team	League	GP	G	A	Pts	PIM	GP	G	A	Pts	PIM
1995–96	Shelburne Hornets	MetJHL	42	13	18	31	12	—	—	—	—	—
1996–97	Barrie Colts	OHL	63	10	18	28	15	9	3	8	11	13
1997–98	Barrie Colts	OHL	63	13	21	34	21	6	1	2	3	4
1998–99	Barrie Colts	OHL	69	19	34	53	18	12	3	8	11	8
1999–00	Louisville Panthers	AHL	53	8	4	12	8	4	0	0	0	0
1999–00	Port Huron Border Cats	UHL	2	1	1	2	0	—	—	—	—	—
2000–01	Louisville Panthers	AHL	23	1	2	3	25	—	—	—	—	—
2001–02	Florida Panthers	NHL	15	0	0	0	0	—	—	—	—	—
2001–02	Bridgeport Sound Tigers	AHL	22	3	6	9	4	—	—	—	—	—
2001–02	Saint John Flames	AHL	41	8	9	17	10	—	—	—	—	—
2002–03	Cincinnati Mighty Ducks	AHL	79	12	26	38	28	—	—	—	—	—
2003–04	Cincinnati Mighty Ducks	AHL	67	4	11	15	66	3	0	1	1	0
2004–05	Trondheim Black Panthers	NOR	38	28	31	59	81	8	5	4	9	14
2005–06	Bietigheim Steelers	2.GBun	50	15	30	45	93	7	4	4	8	10
2006–07	Bietigheim Steelers	2.GBun	34	9	23	32	38	—	—	—	—	—
2007–08	Dundas Real McCoys	MLH	15	13	21	34	4	8	2	12	14	2
2008–09	Dundas Real McCoys	MLH	26	20	43	63	13	6	3	8	11	6
2009–10	Dundas Real McCoys	MLH	17	19	28	47	6	7	2	7	9	2
2012–13	Dundas Real McCoys	ACH	17	10	24	34	32	9	1	12	13	0
2013–14	Dundas Real McCoys	ACH	22	7	19	26	6	10	5	11	16	4
NHL totals			15	0	0	0	0	—	—	—	—	—
