= David Morisset (ice hockey) =

Canadian ice hockey player

- Born: April 6, 1981 (age 45) Langley, British Columbia, Canada
- Height: 6 ft 1 in (185 cm)
- Weight: 191 lb (87 kg; 13 st 9 lb)
- Position: Right wing
- Shot: Right
- Played for: Florida Panthers
- NHL draft: 65th overall, 2000; St. Louis Blues
- Playing career: 2001–2005

David Morisset (born April 6, 1981) is a Canadian former professional ice hockey forward who played briefly in the National Hockey League for the Florida Panthers.

== Playing career ==
As a youth, Morriset played in the 1994 Quebec International Pee-Wee Hockey Tournament with a minor ice hockey team from Langley, British Columbia.

Morriset was selected by the St. Louis Blues in the second round, 65th overall, in the 2000 NHL entry draft. Morisset played major junior hockey in the Western Hockey League for the Seattle Thunderbirds when his NHL rights were traded by the Blues to the Florida Panthers in exchange for Scott Mellanby. Morriset made his professional debut in the 2001–02 season with the Bridgeport Sound Tigers of the American Hockey League before he was recalled to the Panthers to make his NHL debut and feature in four games. Morisset retired from professional hockey after an attempted return from injury with the Idaho Steelheads of the ECHL in 2005.

== Career statistics ==
=== Regular season and playoffs ===
			Regular season					Playoffs
Season	Team	League	GP	G	A	Pts	PIM	GP	G	A	Pts	PIM
1997–98	Seattle Thunderbirds	WHL	58	6	2	8	104	5	1	0	1	6
1998–99	Seattle Thunderbirds	WHL	17	4	0	4	31	11	1	1	2	22
1999–2000	Seattle Thunderbirds	WHL	60	23	34	57	69	7	3	4	7	12
2000–01	Seattle Thunderbirds	WHL	61	32	36	68	95	9	4	2	6	12
2001–02	Bridgeport Sound Tigers	AHL	62	9	10	19	46	19	0	1	1	13
2001–02	Florida Panthers	NHL	4	0	0	0	5	—	—	—	—	—
2002–03	San Antonio Rampage	AHL	30	3	3	6	13	—	—	—	—	—
2004–05	Idaho Steelheads	ECHL	30	7	10	17	27	—	—	—	—	—
AHL totals			92	12	13	25	59	19	0	1	1	13
NHL totals			4	0	0	0	5	—	—	—	—	—

=== International ===
Year	Team	Event	Result	GP	G	A	Pts	PIM
1998	Canada	U18	1st place, gold medalist(s)	3	4	1	5	6
2001	Canada	WJC	3rd place, bronze medalist(s)	7	0	1	1	18
Junior totals				10	4	2	6	24
