= Jan Holub (ice hockey) =

Czech ice hockey player

- Born: May 3, 1983 (age 43) Liberec, Czechoslovakia
- Height: 6 ft 2 in (188 cm)
- Weight: 180 lb (82 kg; 12 st 12 lb)
- Position: Defence
- Shot: Left
- Played for: HC Liberec; HC Litvínov; HC Slavia Praha; BK Mladá Boleslav
- NHL draft: 197th overall, 2001; New York Islanders
- Playing career: 2001–2018

Jan Holub (born May 3, 1983, in Liberec, Czechoslovakia) is a former Czech professional ice hockey defenceman who played in the Czech Extraliga.

== Playing career ==
Holub has spent his whole career with HC Liberec, beginning at junior-level. He was picked for the 2001 NHL entry draft by the New York Islanders as a seventh-round pick, but has never played for the Islanders. He represented the Czech Republic junior team in 2003 World Junior Ice Hockey Championships, when Czech team was in quarterfinals.

== Career statistics ==
=== Regular season and playoffs ===
			Regular season					Playoffs
Season	Team	League	GP	G	A	Pts	PIM	GP	G	A	Pts	PIM
1999–2000	HC Liberec	CZE U18	27	1	3	4	59	—	—	—	—	—
2000–01	Bílí Tygři Liberec	CZE U20	31	0	3	3	36	—	—	—	—	—
2001–02	Bílí Tygři Liberec	CZE U20	11	2	0	2	24	—	—	—	—	—
2001–02	Bílí Tygři Liberec	CZE.2	30	1	3	4	22	17	0	0	0	6
2001–02	HC Vlci Jablonec nad Nisou	CZE.3	3	0	0	0	2	—	—	—	—	—
2002–03	Bílí Tygři Liberec	CZE U20	13	0	6	6	63	8	0	1	1	8
2002–03	Bílí Tygři Liberec	ELH	21	2	2	4	4	—	—	—	—	—
2002–03	HC Vlci Jablonec nad Nisou	CZE.3		0	2	2		—	—	—	—	—
2003–04	Bílí Tygři Liberec	CZE U20	1	0	1	1	0	—	—	—	—	—
2003–04	Bílí Tygři Liberec	ELH	30	1	0	1	22	—	—	—	—	—
2003–04	HC Berounští Medvědi	CZE.2	17	2	3	5	26	—	—	—	—	—
2004–05	Bílí Tygři Liberec	ELH	30	1	3	4	18	—	—	—	—	—
2004–05	HC Berounští Medvědi	CZE.2	20	0	2	2	16	—	—	—	—	—
2005–06	Bílí Tygři Liberec	ELH	39	3	1	4	18	5	0	1	1	22
2005–06	HC Berounští Medvědi	CZE.2	8	1	1	2	10	—	—	—	—	—
2006–07	Bílí Tygři Liberec	ELH	11	1	0	1	10	3	0	0	0	2
2007–08	Bílí Tygři Liberec	ELH	44	1	0	1	24	6	0	0	0	0
2007–08	HC Vrchlabí	CZE.2	7	1	0	1	16	—	—	—	—	—
2008–09	Bílí Tygři Liberec	ELH	13	0	0	0	6	—	—	—	—	—
2008–09	BK Mladá Boleslav	ELH	29	0	4	4	16	—	—	—	—	—
2009–10	Bílí Tygři Liberec	ELH	33	2	0	2	30	12	0	1	1	8
2009–10	HC Benátky nad Jizerou	CZE.2	5	0	0	0	2	—	—	—	—	—
2010–11	Bílí Tygři Liberec	ELH	30	1	0	1	26	7	0	0	0	10
2010–11	HC Benátky nad Jizerou	CZE.2	2	0	0	0	2	—	—	—	—	—
2011–12	Bílí Tygři Liberec	ELH	49	1	4	5	20	11	0	1	1	2
2012–13	Bílí Tygři Liberec	ELH	5	0	0	0	0	—	—	—	—	—
2012–13	HC Verva Litvínov	ELH	19	0	3	3	12	—	—	—	—	—
2012–13	HC Slavia Praha	ELH	13	0	2	2	8	9	2	0	2	4
2013–14	HC Slavia Praha	ELH	51	1	2	3	18	5	0	0	0	2
2014–15	HC Slavia Praha	ELH	24	0	2	2	28	—	—	—	—	—
2014–15	BK Mladá Boleslav	ELH	12	0	0	0	2	3	0	2	2	2
2015–16	BK Mladá Boleslav	ELH	35	1	3	4	32	3	0	0	0	0
2016–17	BK Mladá Boleslav	ELH	24	0	0	0	16	1	0	0	0	0
2016–17	HC Benátky nad Jizerou	CZE.2	8	0	0	0	4	—	—	—	—	—
2017–18	HC Vlci Jablonec nad Nisou	CZE.3	6	0	1	1	2	—	—	—	—	—
ELH totals			512	15	26	41	310	65	2	5	7	52
CZE.2 totals			97	5	9	14	96	17	0	0	0	6

=== International ===
Year	Team	Event	GP	G	A	Pts	PIM
2001	Czech Republic	WJC18	7	0	0	0	6
2003	Czech Republic	WJC	6	0	0	0	14
Junior totals			13	0	0	0	20
