= Darren Van Impe =

Canadian ice hockey player (born 1973)

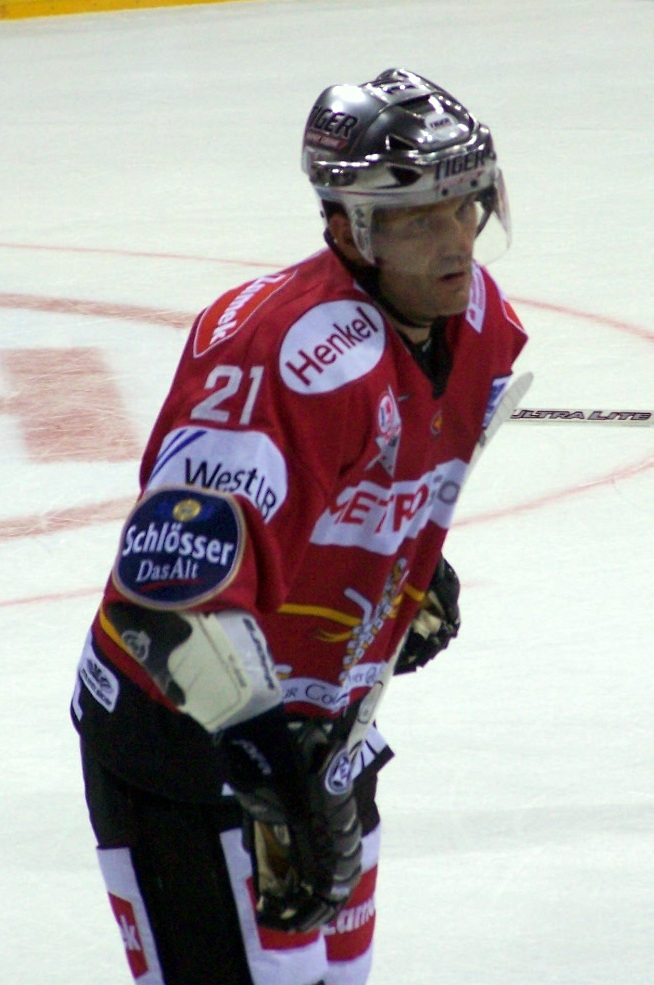
- Darren Van Impe (2007)
- Born: May 18, 1973 (age 53) Saskatoon, Saskatchewan, Canada
- Height: 6 ft 1 in (185 cm)
- Weight: 193 lb (88 kg; 13 st 11 lb)
- Position: Defence
- Shot: Left
- Played for: Mighty Ducks of Anaheim; Boston Bruins; New York Rangers; Florida Panthers; New York Islanders; Columbus Blue Jackets; Hamburg Freezers (DEL); DEG Metro Stars (DEL)
- NHL draft: 170th overall, 1993; New York Islanders
- Playing career: 1995–2008

Darren Cyril Van Impe (born May 18, 1973) is a Canadian former ice hockey defenceman. He played in the National Hockey League for the Mighty Ducks of Anaheim, Boston Bruins, New York Rangers, Florida Panthers, New York Islanders, Columbus Blue Jackets between 1995 and 2003.

== Playing career ==
Van Impe was drafted 170th overall by the New York Islanders in the 1993 NHL entry draft and started his National Hockey League career with the Mighty Ducks of Anaheim in 1995. He also played for the Boston Bruins, New York Rangers, Florida Panthers, New York Islanders, and Columbus Blue Jackets. In total, Van Impe played 411 regular season games, scoring 25 goals and 90 assists for 115 points, collecting 397 penalty minutes. He also played 33 playoff games, scoring 3 goals and 9 assists for 12 points and collecting 28 penalty minutes. He scored his first NHL goal on Easter Sunday 4/7/1996 at San Jose in a 5-3 Anaheim win. He left the NHL after the 2003 season and moved to Germany to play in the Deutsche Eishockey Liga. He first played for the Hamburg Freezers between 2003 and 2006 before moving to the DEG Metro Stars before retiring in 2008.

== Career statistics ==
=== Regular season and playoffs ===
			Regular season					Playoffs
Season	Team	League	GP	G	A	Pts	PIM	GP	G	A	Pts	PIM
1989–90	Prince Albert Raiders U18 AAA	SMAAAHL	32	16	31	47	100	—	—	—	—	—
1989–90	Prince Albert Raiders	WHL	1	0	1	1	0	—	—	—	—	—
1990–91	Prince Albert Raiders	WHL	70	15	45	60	57	3	1	1	2	2
1991–92	Prince Albert Raiders	WHL	69	9	37	46	129	8	1	5	6	10
1992–93	Red Deer Rebels	WHL	54	23	47	70	118	4	2	5	7	16
1993–94	Red Deer Rebels	WHL	58	20	64	84	125	4	2	4	6	6
1994–95	Mighty Ducks of Anaheim	NHL	1	0	1	1	4	—	—	—	—	—
1994–95	San Diego Gulls	IHL	76	6	17	23	74	5	0	0	0	0
1995–96	Mighty Ducks of Anaheim	NHL	16	1	2	3	14	—	—	—	—	—
1995–96	Baltimore Bandits	AHL	63	11	47	58	79	—	—	—	—	—
1996–97	Mighty Ducks of Anaheim	NHL	74	4	19	23	90	9	0	2	2	16
1997–98	Mighty Ducks of Anaheim	NHL	19	1	3	4	4	—	—	—	—	—
1997–98	Boston Bruins	NHL	50	2	8	10	36	6	2	1	3	0
1998–99	Boston Bruins	NHL	60	5	15	20	66	11	1	2	3	4
1999–00	Boston Bruins	NHL	79	5	23	28	73	—	—	—	—	—
2000–01	Boston Bruins	NHL	31	3	10	13	41	—	—	—	—	—
2001–02	New York Rangers	NHL	17	1	0	1	12	—	—	—	—	—
2001–02	Florida Panthers	NHL	36	1	6	7	31	—	—	—	—	—
2001–02	New York Islanders	NHL	14	1	2	3	16	7	0	4	4	8
2002–03	Columbus Blue Jackets	NHL	14	1	1	2	10	—	—	—	—	—
2002–03	Syracuse Crunch	AHL	6	1	4	5	8	—	—	—	—	—
2003–04	Hamburg Freezers	DEL	51	9	22	31	115	10	3	5	8	25
2004–05	Hamburg Freezers	DEL	49	7	29	36	82	5	1	1	2	8
2005–06	Hamburg Freezers	DEL	39	7	22	29	117	6	0	3	3	14
2006–07	DEG Metro Stars	DEL	45	8	18	26	94	9	2	5	7	24
2007–08	DEG Metro Stars	DEL	45	5	16	21	78	12	0	7	7	12
2008–09	Fairview Kings	NPHL	—	—	—	—	—	—	—	—	—	—
2009–10	Bentley Generals	ChHL	5	0	1	1	2	6	1	3	4	10
2012–13	Bentley Generals	ChHL	2	0	0	0	2	2	0	0	0	2
DEL totals			226	36	107	143	486	42	6	21	27	93
NHL totals			411	25	90	115	397	33	3	9	12	28

== Awards ==
- WHL East First All-Star Team – 1993 & 1994
