= 2001–02 Nashville Predators season =

Professional ice hockey team season

2001–02 Nashville Predators
- Division: 4th Central
- Conference: 14th Western
- 2001–02 record: 28–41–13–0
- Home record: 17–16–8–0
- Road record: 11–25–5–0
- Goals for: 196
- Goals against: 230

Team information
- General manager: David Poile
- Coach: Barry Trotz
- Captain: Tom Fitzgerald (Oct-Mar); Vacant (Mar-Apr)
- Alternate captains: Bill Houlder (road); Greg Johnson (home); Cliff Ronning (home); Kimmo Timonen (road)
- Arena: Gaylord Entertainment Center
- Average attendance: 14,788
- Minor league affiliates: Milwaukee Admirals; Cincinnati Cyclones

Team leaders
- Goals: Denis Arkhipov (20)
- Assists: Cliff Ronning (31)
- Points: Cliff Ronning (49)
- Penalty minutes: Cale Hulse (121)
- Plus/minus: Scott Hartnell (+5)
- Wins: Mike Dunham (23)
- Goals against average: Mike Dunham (2.61)

The 2001–02 Nashville Predators season was the Nashville Predators' fourth season in the National Hockey League (NHL). The Predators missed the playoffs for the fourth straight year.

== Regular season ==
=== Final standings ===
Central Division
No.	CR		GP	W	L	T	OTL	GF	GA	Pts
1	1	**Detroit Red Wings**	82	51	17	10	4	251	187	116
2	4	**St. Louis Blues**	82	43	27	8	4	227	188	98
3	5	**Chicago Blackhawks**	82	41	27	13	1	216	207	96
4	14	Nashville Predators	82	28	41	13	0	196	230	69
5	15	Columbus Blue Jackets	82	22	47	8	5	164	255	57

Note: CR = Conference rank; GP = Games played; W = Wins; L = Losses; T = Ties; OTL = Overtime loss; GF = Goals for; GA = Goals against; Pts = Points
Bolded teams qualified for the playoffs.

Western Conference
R		Div	GP	W	L	T	OTL	GF	GA	Pts
**1**	**p – Detroit Red Wings**	**CEN**	**82**	**51**	**17**	**10**	**4**	**251**	**187**	**116**
**2**	**y – Colorado Avalanche**	**NW**	**82**	**45**	**28**	**8**	**1**	**212**	**169**	**99**
**3**	**y – San Jose Sharks**	**PAC**	**82**	**44**	**27**	**8**	**3**	**248**	**199**	**99**
**4**	**St. Louis Blues**	**CEN**	**82**	**43**	**27**	**8**	**4**	**227**	**188**	**98**
**5**	**Chicago Blackhawks**	**CEN**	**82**	**41**	**27**	**13**	**1**	**216**	**207**	**96**
**6**	**Phoenix Coyotes**	**PAC**	**82**	**40**	**27**	**9**	**6**	**228**	**210**	**95**
**7**	**Los Angeles Kings**	**PAC**	**82**	**40**	**27**	**11**	**4**	**214**	**190**	**95**
**8**	**Vancouver Canucks**	**NW**	**82**	**42**	**30**	**7**	**3**	**254**	**211**	**94**
8.5
9	Edmonton Oilers	NW	82	38	28	12	4	205	182	92
10	Dallas Stars	PAC	82	36	28	13	5	215	213	90
11	Calgary Flames	NW	82	32	35	12	3	201	220	79
12	Minnesota Wild	NW	82	26	35	12	9	195	238	73
13	Mighty Ducks of Anaheim	PAC	82	29	42	8	3	175	198	69
14	Nashville Predators	CEN	82	28	41	13	0	196	230	69
15	Columbus Blue Jackets	CEN	82	22	47	8	5	164	255	57

Divisions: CEN – Central, PAC – Pacific, NW – Northwest

bold – Qualified for playoffs; p – Won Presidents' Trophy; y – Won division

== Schedule and results ==
2001–02 regular season
October: 4–7–2–0 (home: 1–5–1–0; road: 3–2–1–0)

Game	Date	Score	Opponent	Record	Recap
1	October 5, 2001	1–4	@ Dallas Stars (2001–02)	0–1–0–0	L
2	October 6, 2001	2–2 OT	St. Louis Blues (2001–02)	0–1–1–0	T
3	October 11, 2001	1–0	Calgary Flames (2001–02)	1–1–1–0	W
4	October 13, 2001	3–4	Edmonton Oilers (2001–02)	1–2–1–0	L
5	October 16, 2001	3–3 OT	@ Buffalo Sabres (2001–02)	1–2–2–0	T
6	October 18, 2001	3–5	Chicago Blackhawks (2001–02)	1–3–2–0	L
7	October 20, 2001	1–2	Boston Bruins (2001–02)	1–4–2–0	L
8	October 22, 2001	4–2	@ Edmonton Oilers (2001–02)	2–4–2–0	W
9	October 23, 2001	2–4	@ Vancouver Canucks (2001–02)	2–5–2–0	L
10	October 25, 2001	5–4 OT	@ Calgary Flames (2001–02)	3–5–2–0	W
11	October 27, 2001	0–1	Detroit Red Wings (2001–02)	3–6–2–0	L
12	October 30, 2001	2–4	Minnesota Wild (2001–02)	3–7–2–0	L
13	October 31, 2001	6–4	@ Minnesota Wild (2001–02)	4–7–2–0	W

November: 5–6–1–0 (home: 5–0–0–0; road: 0–6–1–0)

Game	Date	Score	Opponent	Record	Recap
14	November 2, 2001	0–3	@ Dallas Stars (2001–02)	4–8–2–0	L
15	November 3, 2001	4–1	Dallas Stars (2001–02)	5–8–2–0	W
16	November 8, 2001	1–3	@ Montreal Canadiens (2001–02)	5–9–2–0	L
17	November 10, 2001	2–3	@ Ottawa Senators (2001–02)	5–10–2–0	L
18	November 13, 2001	4–1	Buffalo Sabres (2001–02)	6–10–2–0	W
19	November 16, 2001	4–4 OT	@ Atlanta Thrashers (2001–02)	6–10–3–0	T
20	November 17, 2001	3–2	Columbus Blue Jackets (2001–02)	7–10–3–0	W
21	November 20, 2001	3–6	@ Detroit Red Wings (2001–02)	7–11–3–0	L
22	November 21, 2001	4–3	Chicago Blackhawks (2001–02)	8–11–3–0	W
23	November 23, 2001	5–0	Pittsburgh Penguins (2001–02)	9–11–3–0	W
24	November 27, 2001	2–3	@ San Jose Sharks (2001–02)	9–12–3–0	L
25	November 29, 2001	0–1	@ Phoenix Coyotes (2001–02)	9–13–3–0	L

December: 5–4–3–0 (home: 4–1–3–0; road: 1–3–0–0)

Game	Date	Score	Opponent	Record	Recap
26	December 1, 2001	2–4	@ Los Angeles Kings (2001–02)	9–14–3–0	L
27	December 2, 2001	2–4	@ Mighty Ducks of Anaheim (2001–02)	9–15–3–0	L
28	December 6, 2001	4–2	Ottawa Senators (2001–02)	10–15–3–0	W
29	December 8, 2001	2–2 OT	Edmonton Oilers (2001–02)	10–15–4–0	T
30	December 11, 2001	1–1 OT	Los Angeles Kings (2001–02)	10–15–5–0	T
31	December 12, 2001	4–2	@ New York Rangers (2001–02)	11–15–5–0	W
32	December 15, 2001	5–2	Chicago Blackhawks (2001–02)	12–15–5–0	W
33	December 20, 2001	6–2	Vancouver Canucks (2001–02)	13–15–5–0	W
34	December 23, 2001	1–1 OT	San Jose Sharks (2001–02)	13–15–6–0	T
35	December 26, 2001	0–1	Tampa Bay Lightning (2001–02)	13–16–6–0	L
36	December 29, 2001	3–2 OT	Detroit Red Wings (2001–02)	14–16–6–0	W
37	December 30, 2001	2–7	@ St. Louis Blues (2001–02)	14–17–6–0	L

January: 6–8–3–0 (home: 3–2–2–0; road: 3–6–1–0)

Game	Date	Score	Opponent	Record	Recap
38	January 1, 2002	4–4 OT	Colorado Avalanche (2001–02)	14–17–7–0	T
39	January 3, 2002	4–3	@ New Jersey Devils (2001–02)	15–17–7–0	W
40	January 4, 2002	1–2	@ Minnesota Wild (2001–02)	15–18–7–0	L
41	January 6, 2002	3–4	@ Columbus Blue Jackets (2001–02)	15–19–7–0	L
42	January 8, 2002	3–4	@ Toronto Maple Leafs (2001–02)	15–20–7–0	L
43	January 10, 2002	2–2 OT	Minnesota Wild (2001–02)	15–20–8–0	T
44	January 12, 2002	2–1	Mighty Ducks of Anaheim (2001–02)	16–20–8–0	W
45	January 14, 2002	3–5	@ Mighty Ducks of Anaheim (2001–02)	16–21–8–0	L
46	January 15, 2002	0–2	@ Los Angeles Kings (2001–02)	16–22–8–0	L
47	January 17, 2002	3–2 OT	Toronto Maple Leafs (2001–02)	17–22–8–0	W
48	January 19, 2002	2–1	Columbus Blue Jackets (2001–02)	18–22–8–0	W
49	January 21, 2002	0–1	Phoenix Coyotes (2001–02)	18–23–8–0	L
50	January 23, 2002	2–2 OT	@ Carolina Hurricanes (2001–02)	18–23–9–0	T
51	January 24, 2002	3–2 OT	@ Philadelphia Flyers (2001–02)	19–23–9–0	W
52	January 26, 2002	1–3	Mighty Ducks of Anaheim (2001–02)	19–24–9–0	L
53	January 28, 2002	1–5	@ Vancouver Canucks (2001–02)	19–25–9–0	L
54	January 30, 2002	5–2	@ Colorado Avalanche (2001–02)	20–25–9–0	W

February: 4–1–1–0 (home: 2–1–1–0; road: 2–0–0–0)

Game	Date	Score	Opponent	Record	Recap
55	February 6, 2002	2–1	Dallas Stars (2001–02)	21–25–9–0	W
56	February 8, 2002	3–3 OT	Washington Capitals (2001–02)	21–25–10–0	T
57	February 9, 2002	1–0 OT	@ Columbus Blue Jackets (2001–02)	22–25–10–0	W
58	February 12, 2002	1–0	Florida Panthers (2001–02)	23–25–10–0	W
59	February 26, 2002	1–5	San Jose Sharks (2001–02)	23–26–10–0	L
60	February 28, 2002	3–2	@ Edmonton Oilers (2001–02)	24–26–10–0	W

March: 2–10–3–0 (home: 1–6–1–0; road: 1–4–2–0)

Game	Date	Score	Opponent	Record	Recap
61	March 2, 2002	2–5	@ Calgary Flames (2001–02)	24–27–10–0	L
62	March 5, 2002	2–0	@ San Jose Sharks (2001–02)	25–27–10–0	W
63	March 7, 2002	2–3	Los Angeles Kings (2001–02)	25–28–10–0	L
64	March 9, 2002	2–2 OT	@ Florida Panthers (2001–02)	25–28–11–0	T
65	March 10, 2002	1–5	@ Tampa Bay Lightning (2001–02)	25–29–11–0	L
66	March 12, 2002	0–5	Vancouver Canucks (2001–02)	25–30–11–0	L
67	March 15, 2002	2–3	Phoenix Coyotes (2001–02)	25–31–11–0	L
68	March 17, 2002	4–5	Colorado Avalanche (2001–02)	25–32–11–0	L
69	March 19, 2002	1–5	@ St. Louis Blues (2001–02)	25–33–11–0	L
70	March 21, 2002	3–4	New Jersey Devils (2001–02)	25–34–11–0	L
71	March 23, 2002	5–1	Montreal Canadiens (2001–02)	26–34–11–0	W
72	March 25, 2002	3–3 OT	Detroit Red Wings (2001–02)	26–34–12–0	T
73	March 27, 2002	1–4	@ Chicago Blackhawks (2001–02)	26–35–12–0	L
74	March 28, 2002	3–3 OT	@ Detroit Red Wings (2001–02)	26–35–13–0	T
75	March 30, 2002	2–4	St. Louis Blues (2001–02)	26–36–13–0	L

April: 2–5–0–0 (home: 1–1–0–0; road: 1–4–0–0)

Game	Date	Score	Opponent	Record	Recap
76	April 1, 2002	1–5	@ Colorado Avalanche (2001–02)	26–37–13–0	L
77	April 3, 2002	3–1	@ Chicago Blackhawks (2001–02)	27–37–13–0	W
78	April 4, 2002	1–2	@ Columbus Blue Jackets (2001–02)	27–38–13–0	L
79	April 6, 2002	3–1	Calgary Flames (2001–02)	28–38–13–0	W
80	April 9, 2002	2–3	@ St. Louis Blues (2001–02)	28–39–13–0	L
81	April 11, 2002	2–5	New York Islanders (2001–02)	28–40–13–0	L
82	April 14, 2002	4–6	@ Phoenix Coyotes (2001–02)	28–41–13–0	L

Legend: W Win (2 points) L Loss (0 points) T Tie (1 point) OTL Overtime loss (1 point)

== Player statistics ==
=== Scoring ===
- Position abbreviations: C = Center; D = Defense; G = Goaltender; LW = Left wing; RW = Right wing
- † = Joined team via a transaction (e.g., trade, waivers, signing) during the season. Stats reflect time with the Predators only.
- ‡ = Left team via a transaction (e.g., trade, waivers, release) during the season. Stats reflect time with the Predators only.

No.	Player	Pos	Regular season					
No.	Player	Pos	GP	G	A	Pts	+/-	PIM
7	Cliff Ronning‡	C	67	18	31	49	0	24
22	Greg Johnson	C	82	18	26	44	−14	38
25	Denis Arkhipov	C	82	20	22	42	−18	16
44	Kimmo Timonen	D	82	13	29	42	2	28
17	Scott Hartnell	LW	75	14	27	41	5	111
5	Andy Delmore	D	73	16	22	38	−13	22
33	Vladimir Orszagh	RW	79	15	21	36	−15	56
19	Martin Erat	RW	80	9	24	33	−11	32
11	David Legwand	C	63	11	19	30	1	54
43	Vitali Yachmenev	LW	75	11	16	27	−16	14
15	Petr Tenkrat†	RW	58	8	16	24	−4	28
3	Karlis Skrastins	D	82	4	13	17	−12	36
21	Tom Fitzgerald‡	RW	63	7	9	16	−4	33
9	Greg Classen	C	55	5	6	11	1	30
26	Andrew Berenzweig	D	26	3	7	10	−3	14
24	Scott Walker	RW	28	4	5	9	−13	18
4	Mark Eaton	D	58	3	5	8	−12	24
23	Bill Houlder	D	82	0	8	8	−1	40
14	Steve Dubinsky†	C	26	5	2	7	−2	10
12	Reid Simpson†	LW	26	5	0	5	−1	69
27	Jukka Hentunen†	RW	10	2	2	4	0	0
10	Patric Kjellberg‡	RW	12	1	3	4	−3	6
39	Marian Cisar	RW	10	1	2	3	−3	8
18	Mark Mowers	C	14	1	2	3	−2	2
20	Nathan Perrott†	RW	22	1	2	3	−1	74
8	Stu Grimson	LW	30	1	1	2	0	76
1	Mike Dunham	G	58	0	2	2		2
32	Cale Hulse	D	63	0	2	2	−18	121
34	Adam Hall	RW	1	0	1	1	0	0
13 (Note: Karalahti wore number 16 in his first game.)	Jere Karalahti†	D	15	0	1	1	−1	12
48	Jonas Andersson	RW	5	0	0	0	−2	2
14	Rich Brennan‡	D	4	0	0	0	0	2
40	David Gosselin	RW	3	0	0	0	−1	5
14	Brett Hauer†	D	3	0	0	0	−3	6
35	Jan Lasak	G	3	0	0	0		2
16	Marc Moro‡	D	13	0	0	0	−3	23
12	Yves Sarault‡	LW	1	0	0	0	0	0
42	Robert Schnabel	D	1	0	0	0	0	0
42	Pavel Skrbek	D	3	0	0	0	−2	2
28	Jeremy Stevenson	LW	4	0	0	0	0	9
29	Tomas Vokoun	G	29	0	0	0		2

=== Goaltending ===
No.	Player	Regular season									
No.	Player	GP	W	L	T	SA	GA	GAA	SV%	SO	TOI
1	Mike Dunham	58	23	24	9	1525	144	2.61	.906	3	3316
29	Tomas Vokoun	29	5	14	4	678	66	2.69	.903	2	1471
35	Jan Lasak	3	0	3	0	104	13	4.41	.875	0	177

== Awards and records ==
=== Awards ===
Type	Award/honor	Recipient	Ref
League (in-season)	NHL YoungStars Game selection	Scott Hartnell	
League (in-season)	NHL YoungStars Game selection	David Legwand	

=== Milestones ===
Milestone	Player	Date	Ref
First game	Martin Erat	October 5, 2001	
First game	Robert Schnabel	January 12, 2002	
First game	Nathan Perrott	February 9, 2002	
First game	Jonas Andersson	March 19, 2002	
First game	Jan Lasak	April 9, 2002	
First game	Adam Hall	April 14, 2002	
1,000th game played	Cliff Ronning	March 9, 2002	

== Transactions ==
The Predators were involved in the following transactions from June 10, 2001, the day after the deciding game of the 2001 Stanley Cup Final, through June 13, 2002, the day of the deciding game of the 2002 Stanley Cup Final.

=== Trades ===
Date	Details		Ref
June 24, 2001	To Nashville Predators: NY Islanders' 4th-round pick in 2001	To Philadelphia Flyers: 4th-round pick in 2001; 5th-round pick in 2001; 7th-round pick in 2001	
July 31, 2001	To Nashville Predators: Andy Delmore	To Philadelphia Flyers: 3rd-round pick in 2002	
October 9, 2001	To Nashville Predators: Nathan Perrott	To Chicago Blackhawks: Conditional draft pick in 2003	
November 1, 2001	To Nashville Predators: Petr Tenkrat	To Anaheim Mighty Ducks: Patric Kjellberg	
December 4, 2001	To Nashville Predators: Jay Legault	To Anaheim Mighty Ducks: Bert Robertsson	
December 18, 2001	To Nashville Predators: Brett Hauer	To Los Angeles Kings: Rich Brennan	
January 11, 2002	To Nashville Predators: Jason Beckett; Petr Hubacek	To Philadelphia Flyers: Yves Sarault; Conditional draft pick in 2003 (Note: Condition not met. The Flyers would have received the draft pick if either Beckett or Hubacek played in the NHL for the Predators during the 2001–02 or 2002–03 season.)	
February 6, 2002	To Nashville Predators: Steve Dubinsky	To Chicago Blackhawks: Future considerations	
March 1, 2002	To Nashville Predators: D. J. Smith; Marty Wilford	To Toronto Maple Leafs: Marc Moro	
March 1, 2002	To Nashville Predators: Conditional draft pick (Note: 9th-round pick in 2002)	To Colorado Avalanche: D. J. Smith	
March 13, 2002	To Nashville Predators: 4th-round pick in 2003; Future considerations	To Chicago Blackhawks: Tom Fitzgerald	
March 16, 2002	To Nashville Predators: Jere Karalahti; Conditional draft pick in 2003	To Los Angeles Kings: Cliff Ronning	
March 17, 2002	To Nashville Predators: Jukka Hentunen	To Calgary Flames: Conditional draft pick in 2003	
March 19, 2002	To Nashville Predators: Peter Smrek	To New York Rangers: Richard Lintner	
May 15, 2002	To Nashville Predators: Steve Parsons	To Pittsburgh Penguins: Future considerations	

=== Players acquired ===
Date	Player	Former team	Term	Via	Ref
June 19, 2001	Yves Sarault	Atlanta Thrashers		Waivers	
July 2, 2001	Stu Grimson	Los Angeles Kings	2-year	Free agency	
August 8, 2001	Erik Anderson	St. Lawrence University (ECAC)		Free agency	
August 8, 2001	Rich Brennan	Los Angeles Kings		Free agency	
January 30, 2002	Reid Simpson	Montreal Canadiens		Waivers	
May 6, 2002	Vernon Fiddler	Norfolk Admirals (AHL)		Free agency	

=== Players lost ===
Date	Player	New team	Via (Note: In parentheses is the player's free agency group on July 1 if applicable.)	Ref
N/A	Evgeny Namestnikov	HC Lada Togliatti (RSL)	Free agency (VI)	
July 1, 2001	Jayson More (Note: More suffered a career-ending injury during the 1998–99 season.)		Contract expiration (III)	
July 7, 2001	Randy Robitaille	Los Angeles Kings	Free agency (UFA)	
July 18, 2001	Alexei Vasiliev	Lokomotiv Yaroslavl (RSL)	Free agency	
August 15, 2001	Jayme Filipowicz	Quebec Citadelles (AHL)	Free agency (UFA)	
August 16, 2001	Rob Valicevic	Los Angeles Kings	Free agency (UFA)	
September 6, 2001	Dan Riva	Reading Royals (ECHL)	Free agency (UFA)	
October 10, 2001	Sean Haggerty	Providence Bruins (AHL)	Free agency (VI)	
October 17, 2001	Richard Lintner	HK Dukla Trencin (Slovakia)	Free agency (Note: Nashville retained Lintner’s NHL rights until trading them to the New York Rangers on March 19, 2002.)	
May 14, 2002	Alexandre Boikov	Metallurg Magnitogorsk (RSL)	Free agency	
May 15, 2002	Petr Tenkrat	Karpat (Liiga)	Free agency (Note: Nashville retained Tenkrat’s NHL rights until he was claimed by the Florida Panthers in the 2002 NHL waiver draft.)	

=== Signings ===
Date	Player	Term	Contract type	Ref
June 11, 2001	Mark Eaton		Re-signing	
July 13, 2001	Yves Sarault		Re-signing	
July 13, 2001	Robert Schnabel		Re-signing	
July 16, 2001	Martin Erat		Entry-level	
July 31, 2001	Bill Bowler		Re-signing	
July 31, 2001	Mikhail Chernov		Re-signing	
July 31, 2001	Marian Cisar		Re-signing	
July 31, 2001	David Gosselin		Re-signing	
July 31, 2001	Pavel Skrbek		Re-signing	
August 1, 2001	Scott Walker	3-year	Re-signing	
August 8, 2001	Andrew Berenzweig		Re-signing	
August 8, 2001	Evgeny Pavlov		Entry-level	
August 12, 2001	Cale Hulse	1-year	Arbitration award	
August 13, 2001	Mike Dunham		Re-signing	
March 25, 2002	Adam Hall		Entry-level	
March 25, 2002	Andrew Hutchinson		Entry-level	
April 17, 2002	Bill Houlder		Extension	
April 17, 2002	Greg Johnson		Extension	
June 12, 2002	Nathan Perrott	1-year	Option exercised	

== Draft picks ==
Nashville's draft picks at the 2001 NHL entry draft held at the National Car Rental Center in Sunrise, Florida.

Round	#	Player	Nationality	College/Junior/Club team (League)
1	12	Dan Hamhuis	Canada	Prince George Cougars (WHL)
2	33	Timofei Shishkanov	Russia	Spartak Moscow (Russia)
2	42	Tomas Slovak	Slovakia	HC Kosice (Slovakia)
3	75	Denis Platonov	Russia	HC Saratov (Russia)
3	76	Oliver Setzinger	Austria	Ilves (Finland)
4	98	Jordin Tootoo	Canada	Brandon Wheat Kings (WHL)
6	178	Anton Lavrentiev	United States	Ak Bars Kazan (Russia)
8	240	Gustav Grasberg	Sweden	Mora IK (Sweden)
9	271	Mikko Lehtonen	Finland	Karpat (Finland)

== See also ==
- 2001–02 NHL season
