= 2001–02 Minnesota Wild season =

National Hockey League team season

2001–02 Minnesota Wild
- Division: 5th Northwest
- Conference: 12th Western
- 2001–02 record: 26–35–12–9
- Home record: 14–14–8–5
- Road record: 12–21–4–4
- Goals for: 195
- Goals against: 238

Team information
- General manager: Doug Risebrough
- Coach: Jacques Lemaire
- Captain: Rotating; Jim Dowd (Oct.); Filip Kuba (Nov.); Brad Brown (Dec.–Jan.); Andrew Brunette (Feb.–Apr.)
- Alternate captains: Brad Bombardir; Darby Hendrickson
- Arena: Xcel Energy Center
- Average attendance: 18,455
- Minor league affiliates: Houston Aeros; Louisiana IceGators

Team leaders
- Goals: Marian Gaborik (30)
- Assists: Andrew Brunette (48)
- Points: Andrew Brunette (69)
- Penalty minutes: Matt Johnson (183)
- Plus/minus: Marian Gaborik (0); Nick Schultz (0); Wes Walz (0)
- Wins: Dwayne Roloson (14)
- Goals against average: Dwayne Roloson (2.68)

The 2001–02 Minnesota Wild season was the team's second season of operation in the National Hockey League (NHL). The Wild missed the Stanley Cup playoffs for the second straight season, finishing last in the Northwest Division.

== Regular season ==
=== Final standings ===
Northwest Division
No.	CR		GP	W	L	T	OTL	GF	GA	Pts
1	2	**Colorado Avalanche**	82	45	28	8	1	212	169	99
2	8	**Vancouver Canucks**	82	42	30	7	3	254	211	94
3	9	Edmonton Oilers	82	38	28	12	4	205	182	92
4	11	Calgary Flames	82	32	35	12	3	201	220	79
5	12	Minnesota Wild	82	26	35	12	9	195	238	73

Note: CR = Conference rank; GP = Games played; W = Wins; L = Losses; T = Ties; OTL = Overtime loss; GF = Goals for; GA = Goals against; Pts = Points
Bolded teams qualified for the playoffs.

Western Conference
R		Div	GP	W	L	T	OTL	GF	GA	Pts
**1**	**p – Detroit Red Wings**	**CEN**	**82**	**51**	**17**	**10**	**4**	**251**	**187**	**116**
**2**	**y – Colorado Avalanche**	**NW**	**82**	**45**	**28**	**8**	**1**	**212**	**169**	**99**
**3**	**y – San Jose Sharks**	**PAC**	**82**	**44**	**27**	**8**	**3**	**248**	**199**	**99**
**4**	**St. Louis Blues**	**CEN**	**82**	**43**	**27**	**8**	**4**	**227**	**188**	**98**
**5**	**Chicago Blackhawks**	**CEN**	**82**	**41**	**27**	**13**	**1**	**216**	**207**	**96**
**6**	**Phoenix Coyotes**	**PAC**	**82**	**40**	**27**	**9**	**6**	**228**	**210**	**95**
**7**	**Los Angeles Kings**	**PAC**	**82**	**40**	**27**	**11**	**4**	**214**	**190**	**95**
**8**	**Vancouver Canucks**	**NW**	**82**	**42**	**30**	**7**	**3**	**254**	**211**	**94**
8.5
9	Edmonton Oilers	NW	82	38	28	12	4	205	182	92
10	Dallas Stars	PAC	82	36	28	13	5	215	213	90
11	Calgary Flames	NW	82	32	35	12	3	201	220	79
12	Minnesota Wild	NW	82	26	35	12	9	195	238	73
13	Mighty Ducks of Anaheim	PAC	82	29	42	8	3	175	198	69
14	Nashville Predators	CEN	82	28	41	13	0	196	230	69
15	Columbus Blue Jackets	CEN	82	22	47	8	5	164	255	57

Divisions: CEN – Central, PAC – Pacific, NW – Northwest

bold – Qualified for playoffs; p – Won Presidents' Trophy; y – Won division

== Schedule and results ==
2001–02 regular season
October: 4–3–3–1 (home: 2–2–2–1; road: 2–1–1–0)

Game	Date	Score	Opponent	Record	Recap
1	October 6, 2001	0–0 OT	@ San Jose Sharks (2001–02)	0–0–1–0	T
2	October 7, 2001	4–3	@ Los Angeles Kings (2001–02)	1–0–1–0	W
3	October 10, 2001	2–1	Boston Bruins (2001–02)	2–0–1–0	W
4	October 12, 2001	6–4	Chicago Blackhawks (2001–02)	3–0–1–0	W
5	October 14, 2001	3–3 OT	Edmonton Oilers (2001–02)	3–0–2–0	T
6	October 16, 2001	3–3 OT	San Jose Sharks (2001–02)	3–0–3–0	T
7	October 19, 2001	2–3 OT	St. Louis Blues (2001–02)	3–0–3–1	OTL
8	October 24, 2001	3–7	Carolina Hurricanes (2001–02)	3–1–3–1	L
9	October 27, 2001	2–4	@ Calgary Flames (2001–02)	3–2–3–1	L
10	October 30, 2001	4–2	@ Nashville Predators (2001–02)	4–2–3–1	W
11	October 31, 2001	4–6	Nashville Predators (2001–02)	4–3–3–1	L

November: 7–6–1–1 (home: 5–3–1–0; road: 2–3–0–1)

Game	Date	Score	Opponent	Record	Recap
12	November 2, 2001	4–2	Colorado Avalanche (2001–02)	5–3–3–1	W
13	November 4, 2001	0–2	Edmonton Oilers (2001–02)	5–4–3–1	L
14	November 6, 2001	1–3	@ New York Rangers (2001–02)	5–5–3–1	L
15	November 8, 2001	5–3	@ Boston Bruins (2001–02)	6–5–3–1	W
16	November 11, 2001	0–5	Vancouver Canucks (2001–02)	6–6–3–1	L
17	November 13, 2001	4–2	Atlanta Thrashers (2001–02)	7–6–3–1	W
18	November 14, 2001	0–1	@ Colorado Avalanche (2001–02)	7–7–3–1	L
19	November 16, 2001	3–8	@ Detroit Red Wings (2001–02)	7–8–3–1	L
20	November 18, 2001	2–2 OT	Los Angeles Kings (2001–02)	7–8–4–1	T
21	November 20, 2001	1–2 OT	@ Phoenix Coyotes (2001–02)	7–8–4–2	OTL
22	November 21, 2001	2–0	@ San Jose Sharks (2001–02)	8–8–4–2	W
23	November 23, 2001	5–2	Phoenix Coyotes (2001–02)	9–8–4–2	W
24	November 25, 2001	3–4	Dallas Stars (2001–02)	9–9–4–2	L
25	November 27, 2001	2–1	Vancouver Canucks (2001–02)	10–9–4–2	W
26	November 29, 2001	6–0	Florida Panthers (2001–02)	11–9–4–2	W

December: 2–8–2–1 (home: 0–1–2–1; road: 2–7–0–0)

Game	Date	Score	Opponent	Record	Recap
27	December 2, 2001	4–4 OT	St. Louis Blues (2001–02)	11–9–5–2	T
28	December 5, 2001	2–4	@ Chicago Blackhawks (2001–02)	11–10–5–2	L
29	December 8, 2001	1–5	@ Philadelphia Flyers (2001–02)	11–11–5–2	L
30	December 10, 2001	0–4	@ Montreal Canadiens (2001–02)	11–12–5–2	L
31	December 14, 2001	5–2	@ Pittsburgh Penguins (2001–02)	12–12–5–2	W
32	December 16, 2001	2–3 OT	Colorado Avalanche (2001–02)	12–12–5–3	OTL
33	December 18, 2001	1–5	Mighty Ducks of Anaheim (2001–02)	12–13–5–3	L
34	December 22, 2001	2–1	@ Vancouver Canucks (2001–02)	13–13–5–3	W
35	December 23, 2001	3–6	@ Colorado Avalanche (2001–02)	13–14–5–3	L
36	December 26, 2001	3–3 OT	Detroit Red Wings (2001–02)	13–14–6–3	T
37	December 28, 2001	2–3	@ Edmonton Oilers (2001–02)	13–15–6–3	L
38	December 29, 2001	3–4	@ Calgary Flames (2001–02)	13–16–6–3	L
39	December 31, 2001	2–4	@ Detroit Red Wings (2001–02)	13–17–6–3	L

January: 4–6–3–2 (home: 3–3–2–1; road: 1–3–1–1)

Game	Date	Score	Opponent	Record	Recap
40	January 2, 2002	2–0	Tampa Bay Lightning (2001–02)	14–17–6–3	W
41	January 4, 2002	2–1	Nashville Predators (2001–02)	15–17–6–3	W
42	January 6, 2002	1–4	Buffalo Sabres (2001–02)	15–18–6–3	L
43	January 8, 2002	4–2	Montreal Canadiens (2001–02)	16–18–6–3	W
44	January 10, 2002	2–2 OT	@ Nashville Predators (2001–02)	16–18–7–3	T
45	January 11, 2002	2–2 OT	Mighty Ducks of Anaheim (2001–02)	16–18–8–3	T
46	January 13, 2002	1–3	Dallas Stars (2001–02)	16–19–8–3	L
47	January 15, 2002	0–2	@ Carolina Hurricanes (2001–02)	16–20–8–3	L
48	January 18, 2002	3–1	@ Columbus Blue Jackets (2001–02)	17–20–8–3	W
49	January 19, 2002	1–4	@ Ottawa Senators (2001–02)	17–21–8–3	L
50	January 23, 2002	2–3 OT	@ Mighty Ducks of Anaheim (2001–02)	17–21–8–4	OTL
51	January 24, 2002	1–4	@ Los Angeles Kings (2001–02)	17–22–8–4	L
52	January 26, 2002	2–2 OT	New Jersey Devils (2001–02)	17–22–9–4	T
53	January 28, 2002	2–3 OT	Calgary Flames (2001–02)	17–22–9–5	OTL
54	January 30, 2002	0–2	Los Angeles Kings (2001–02)	17–23–9–5	L

February: 2–4–1–0 (home: 1–2–0–0; road: 1–2–1–0)

Game	Date	Score	Opponent	Record	Recap
55	February 5, 2002	1–3	@ Toronto Maple Leafs (2001–02)	17–24–9–5	L
56	February 6, 2002	1–2	@ Washington Capitals (2001–02)	17–25–9–5	L
57	February 8, 2002	0–6	Colorado Avalanche (2001–02)	17–26–9–5	L
58	February 10, 2002	4–3	New York Islanders (2001–02)	18–26–9–5	W
59	February 12, 2002	3–3 OT	@ Columbus Blue Jackets (2001–02)	18–26–10–5	T
60	February 13, 2002	0–2	Detroit Red Wings (2001–02)	18–27–10–5	L
61	February 27, 2002	5–3	@ Mighty Ducks of Anaheim (2001–02)	19–27–10–5	W

March: 6–5–1–2 (home: 2–2–1–2; road: 4–3–0–0)

Game	Date	Score	Opponent	Record	Recap
62	March 2, 2002	3–6	@ Vancouver Canucks (2001–02)	19–28–10–5	L
63	March 5, 2002	2–3 OT	New York Rangers (2001–02)	19–28–10–6	OTL
64	March 7, 2002	3–0	@ St. Louis Blues (2001–02)	20–28–10–6	W
65	March 8, 2002	5–3	@ Dallas Stars (2001–02)	21–28–10–6	W
66	March 10, 2002	5–0	Columbus Blue Jackets (2001–02)	22–28–10–6	W
67	March 12, 2002	3–4 OT	Ottawa Senators (2001–02)	22–28–10–7	OTL
68	March 17, 2002	2–2 OT	Phoenix Coyotes (2001–02)	22–28–11–7	T
69	March 18, 2002	4–2	Calgary Flames (2001–02)	23–28–11–7	W
70	March 20, 2002	1–3	Columbus Blue Jackets (2001–02)	23–29–11–7	L
71	March 23, 2002	1–2	@ New York Islanders (2001–02)	23–30–11–7	L
72	March 26, 2002	2–1	@ St. Louis Blues (2001–02)	24–30–11–7	W
73	March 27, 2002	4–2	@ Atlanta Thrashers (2001–02)	25–30–11–7	W
74	March 29, 2002	1–3	Chicago Blackhawks (2001–02)	25–31–11–7	L
75	March 31, 2002	1–2	@ Chicago Blackhawks (2001–02)	25–32–11–7	L

April: 1–3–1–2 (home: 1–1–0–0; road: 0–2–1–2)

Game	Date	Score	Opponent	Record	Recap
76	April 2, 2002	1–2 OT	@ Edmonton Oilers (2001–02)	25–32–11–8	OTL
77	April 4, 2002	3–4	@ Calgary Flames (2001–02)	25–33–11–8	L
78	April 5, 2002	4–5 OT	@ Vancouver Canucks (2001–02)	25–33–11–9	OTL
79	April 8, 2002	3–1	San Jose Sharks (2001–02)	26–33–11–9	W
80	April 10, 2002	4–4 OT	@ Dallas Stars (2001–02)	26–33–12–9	T
81	April 12, 2002	1–7	@ Phoenix Coyotes (2001–02)	26–34–12–9	L
82	April 14, 2002	2–4	Edmonton Oilers (2001–02)	26–35–12–9	L

Legend: W Win (2 points) L Loss (0 points) T Tie (1 point) OTL Overtime loss (1 point)

== Player statistics ==
=== Scoring ===
- Position abbreviations: C = Center; D = Defense; G = Goaltender; LW = Left wing; RW = Right wing
- † = Joined team via a transaction (e.g., trade, waivers, signing) during the season. Stats reflect time with the Wild only.
- ‡ = Left team via a transaction (e.g., trade, waivers, release) during the season. Stats reflect time with the Wild only.

No.	Player	Pos	Regular season					
No.	Player	Pos	GP	G	A	Pts	+/-	PIM
15	Andrew Brunette	LW	81	21	48	69	−4	18
10	Marian Gaborik	RW	78	30	37	67	0	34
34	Jim Dowd	C	82	13	30	43	−14	54
33	Sergei Zholtok	C	73	19	20	39	−10	28
24	Antti Laaksonen	LW	82	16	17	33	−5	22
37	Wes Walz	C	64	10	20	30	0	43
11	Pascal Dupuis	LW	76	15	12	27	−10	16
18	Richard Park	RW	63	10	15	25	−1	10
14	Darby Hendrickson	C	68	9	15	24	−22	50
17	Filip Kuba	D	62	5	19	24	−6	32
77	Lubomir Sekeras	D	69	4	20	24	−7	38
22	Stacy Roest	RW	58	10	11	21	−3	8
44	Aaron Gavey	C	71	6	11	17	−21	38
2	Willie Mitchell	D	68	3	10	13	−16	68
23 (Note: Marshall wore number 32 through December 14.)	Jason Marshall	D	80	5	6	11	−8	148
55	Nick Schultz	D	52	4	6	10	0	14
3	Ladislav Benysek	D	74	1	7	8	−12	28
42	Andy Sutton‡	D	19	2	4	6	−4	35
9	Hnat Domenichelli†	LW	27	1	5	6	−5	10
26	Tony Virta	RW	8	2	3	5	0	0
71	Sebastien Bordeleau‡	C	14	1	4	5	−1	8
12	Matt Johnson	LW	60	4	0	4	−13	183
4	Brad Brown	D	51	0	4	4	−11	123
5	Brad Bombardir	D	28	1	2	3	−6	14
31	Roman Simicek	C	6	2	0	2	1	8
25	Sergei Krivokrasov‡	RW	9	1	1	2	−1	17
36	Sylvain Blouin	LW	43	0	2	2	−11	130
19	David Cullen†	D	3	0	0	0	−3	0
35	Manny Fernandez	G	44	0	0	0		4
31	Derek Gustafson	G	1	0	0	0		0
6	Mike Matteucci	D	3	0	0	0	1	2
39	Travis Roche	D	4	0	0	0	−1	2
30	Dwayne Roloson	G	45	0	0	0		8

=== Goaltending ===
No.	Player	Regular season									
No.	Player	GP	W	L	T	SA	GA	GAA	SV%	SO	TOI
30	Dwayne Roloson	45	14	20	7	1132	112	2.68	.901	5	2506
35	Manny Fernandez	44	12	24	5	1157	125	3.05	.892	1	2463
31	Derek Gustafson	1	0	0	0	7	0	0.00	1.000	0	26

== Awards and records ==
=== Awards ===
Type	Award/honor	Recipient	Ref
League (in-season)	NHL Player of the Week	Marian Gaborik (March 11)	
League (in-season)	NHL YoungStars Game selection	Marian Gaborik	
Team	Three Star Award	Marian Gaborik	

=== Milestones ===
Milestone	Player	Date	Ref
First game	Nick Schultz	October 14, 2001	
First game	Tony Virta	March 20, 2002	

== Transactions ==
The Wild were involved in the following transactions from June 10, 2001, the day after the deciding game of the 2001 Stanley Cup Final, through June 13, 2002, the day of the deciding game of the 2002 Stanley Cup Final.

=== Trades ===
Date	Details		Ref
June 23, 2001	To Minnesota Wild: 3rd-round pick in 2001	To New York Rangers: 3rd-round pick in 2001; 5th-round pick in 2001	
June 29, 2001	To Minnesota Wild: Sergei Zholtok	To Edmonton Oilers: Future considerations	
November 1, 2001	To Minnesota Wild: 7th-round pick in 2002; Conditional draft pick in 2003	To Anaheim Mighty Ducks: Sergei Krivokrasov	
January 4, 2002	To Minnesota Wild: David Cullen	To Phoenix Coyotes: Sebastien Bordeleau	
January 22, 2002	To Minnesota Wild: Hnat Domenichelli	To Atlanta Thrashers: Andy Sutton	
March 19, 2002	To Minnesota Wild: Greg Crozier	To Boston Bruins: Darryl Laplante	
May 24, 2002	To Minnesota Wild: Rights to Chris Dyment	To Montreal Canadiens: 5th-round pick in 2002	

=== Players acquired ===
Date	Player	Former team	Term	Via	Ref
June 18, 2001	Shawn Carter	Houston Aeros (AHL)		Free agency	
June 19, 2001	Curtis Murphy	Orlando Solar Bears (IHL)		Free agency	
July 2, 2001	Jason Marshall	Washington Capitals		Free agency	
July 2, 2001	Dwayne Roloson	St. Louis Blues		Free agency	
July 6, 2001	Andrew Brunette	Atlanta Thrashers	multi-year	Free agency	
July 9, 2001	Martin Brochu	Calgary Flames		Free agency	
July 13, 2001	Trent Cull	Pittsburgh Penguins		Free agency	
July 16, 2001	Mark Beaufait	Orlando Solar Bears (IHL)		Free agency	
July 25, 2001	Mike Crowley	Anaheim Mighty Ducks		Free agency	
July 31, 2001	Brad Brown	New York Rangers		Free agency	
September 28, 2001	Sebastien Bordeleau	St. Louis Blues		Waiver draft	
September 29, 2001	Zbynek Michalek	Shawinigan Cataractes (QMJHL)		Free agency	
November 23, 2001	Frederic Cloutier	Louisiana IceGators (ECHL)		Free agency	
April 4, 2002	Jeff Hoggan	University of Nebraska Omaha (CCHA)		Free agency	
April 8, 2002	Matt Cullen	Colorado College (WCHA)		Free agency	
June 3, 2002	Rastislav Pavlikovsky	HV71 (SHL)		Free agency	

=== Players lost ===
Date	Player	New team	Via (Note: In parentheses is the player's free agency group on July 1 if applicable.)	Ref
July 1, 2001	Jeff Nielsen (Note: Nielsen retired.)		Contract expiration (UFA)	
August 1, 2001	Chris Armstrong	New York Islanders	Free agency (VI)	
August 2, 2001	Christian Matte	Buffalo Sabres	Free agency (VI)	
August 29, 2001	Brendan Walsh	Wilkes-Barre/Scranton Penguins (AHL)	Free agency (UFA)	
August 30, 2001	Zac Bierk	Phoenix Coyotes	Free agency (UFA)	
August 31, 2001	Ian Herbers	Ayr Scottish Eagles (BISL)	Free agency (VI)	
N/A	David Brumby	Columbus Cottonmouths (ECHL)	Free agency (UFA)	
September 28, 2001	Martin Brochu	Vancouver Canucks	Waiver draft	
October 4, 2001	Nick Naumenko	Portland Pirates (AHL)	Free agency (VI)	
April 8, 2002	Roman Simicek	HIFK (Liiga)	Free agency	
May 3, 2002	Mark Beaufait	Eisbaren Berlin (DEL)	Free agency	

=== Signings ===
Date	Player	Term	Contract type	Ref
June 28, 2001	Tony Virta		Entry-level	
July 1, 2001	Darby Hendrickson	3-year	Re-signing	
July 3, 2001	Brad Bombardir		Re-signing	
July 3, 2001	Cam Stewart		Re-signing	
July 9, 2001	Pavel Patera		Re-signing	
July 16, 2001	Dan Cavanaugh		Entry-level	
July 17, 2001	Aaron Gavey		Re-signing	
August 2, 2001	Lubomir Sekeras	2-year	Re-signing	
August 3, 2001	Andy Sutton		Re-signing	
August 10, 2001	Manny Fernandez	2-year	Arbitration award	
August 13, 2001	Filip Kuba	2-year	Arbitration award	
August 15, 2001	Sergei Zholtok	1-year	Arbitration award	
September 13, 2001	Sergei Krivokrasov		Re-signing	
September 18, 2001	Stephane Veilleux		Entry-level	
September 23, 2001	Kyle Wanvig		Entry-level	
November 15, 2001	Jim Dowd	multi-year	Extension	
March 9, 2002	Sergei Zholtok	multi-year	Extension	
April 15, 2002	Marc Cavosie		Entry-level	
April 23, 2002	Kyle Kettles		Entry-level	
May 31, 2002	Chris Dyment		Entry-level	

== Draft picks ==
Minnesota's draft picks at the 2001 NHL entry draft held at the National Car Rental Center in Sunrise, Florida.

Round	#	Player	Nationality	College/Junior/Club team (League)
1	6	Mikko Koivu	Finland	TPS (SM-liiga)
2	36	Kyle Wanvig	Canada	Red Deer Rebels (WHL)
3	74	Chris Heid	Canada	Spokane Chiefs (WHL)
3	93	Stephane Veilleux	Canada	Val-d'Or Foreurs (QMJHL)
4	103	Tony Virta	Finland	TPS (SM-liiga)
7	202	Derek Boogaard	Canada	Prince George Cougars (WHL)
8	239	Jake Riddle	United States	Seattle Thunderbirds (WHL)

== See also ==
- 2001–02 NHL season
