= 2001–02 Los Angeles Kings season =

National Hockey League team season

2001–02 Los Angeles Kings
- Division: 3rd Pacific
- Conference: 7th Western
- 2001–02 record: 40–27–11–4
- Home record: 22–12–6–1
- Road record: 18–15–5–3
- Goals for: 214
- Goals against: 190

Team information
- General manager: Dave Taylor
- Coach: Andy Murray; Dave Tippett (interim)
- Captain: Mattias Norstrom
- Alternate captains: Kelly Buchberger; Ian Laperriere; Mathieu Schneider; Bryan Smolinski
- Arena: Staples Center
- Average attendance: 16,756
- Minor league affiliates: Manchester Monarchs; Reading Royals

Team leaders
- Goals: Zigmund Palffy (32)
- Assists: Jason Allison (55)
- Points: Jason Allison (74)
- Penalty minutes: Ian Laperriere (125)
- Plus/minus: Craig Johnson (+14); Aaron Miller (+14)
- Wins: Felix Potvin (31)
- Goals against average: Jamie Storr (1.90)

The 2001–02 Los Angeles Kings season was the Kings' 35th season in the National Hockey League (NHL). Los Angeles hosted the 52nd National Hockey League All-Star Game, which took place on February 2, 2002.

== Offseason ==
Mattias Norstrom was named team captain.

== Regular season ==
Head coach Andy Murray was involved in a car crash on February 15, suffering four broken ribs, a separated shoulder, and later symptoms of post-concussion syndrome. Assistant coach Dave Tippett served as interim head coach until Murray returned to the team on March 6.

The Kings tied the Red Wings for most power-play goals scored during the regular season, with 73, and had the best power-play percentage, at 20.68%.

=== Season standings ===
Pacific Division
No.	CR		GP	W	L	T	OTL	GF	GA	Pts
1	3	**San Jose Sharks**	82	44	27	8	3	248	189	99
2	6	**Phoenix Coyotes**	82	40	27	9	6	228	210	95
3	7	**Los Angeles Kings**	82	40	27	11	4	214	190	95
4	10	Dallas Stars	82	36	28	13	5	215	213	90
5	13	Mighty Ducks of Anaheim	82	29	42	8	3	175	198	69

Note: CR = Conference rank; GP = Games played; W = Wins; L = Losses; T = Ties; OTL = Overtime loss; GF = Goals for; GA = Goals against; Pts = Points
Bolded teams qualified for the playoffs.

Western Conference
R		Div	GP	W	L	T	OTL	GF	GA	Pts
**1**	**p – Detroit Red Wings**	**CEN**	**82**	**51**	**17**	**10**	**4**	**251**	**187**	**116**
**2**	**y – Colorado Avalanche**	**NW**	**82**	**45**	**28**	**8**	**1**	**212**	**169**	**99**
**3**	**y – San Jose Sharks**	**PAC**	**82**	**44**	**27**	**8**	**3**	**248**	**199**	**99**
**4**	**St. Louis Blues**	**CEN**	**82**	**43**	**27**	**8**	**4**	**227**	**188**	**98**
**5**	**Chicago Blackhawks**	**CEN**	**82**	**41**	**27**	**13**	**1**	**216**	**207**	**96**
**6**	**Phoenix Coyotes**	**PAC**	**82**	**40**	**27**	**9**	**6**	**228**	**210**	**95**
**7**	**Los Angeles Kings**	**PAC**	**82**	**40**	**27**	**11**	**4**	**214**	**190**	**95**
**8**	**Vancouver Canucks**	**NW**	**82**	**42**	**30**	**7**	**3**	**254**	**211**	**94**
8.5
9	Edmonton Oilers	NW	82	38	28	12	4	205	182	92
10	Dallas Stars	PAC	82	36	28	13	5	215	213	90
11	Calgary Flames	NW	82	32	35	12	3	201	220	79
12	Minnesota Wild	NW	82	26	35	12	9	195	238	73
13	Mighty Ducks of Anaheim	PAC	82	29	42	8	3	175	198	69
14	Nashville Predators	CEN	82	28	41	13	0	196	230	69
15	Columbus Blue Jackets	CEN	82	22	47	8	5	164	255	57

Divisions: CEN – Central, PAC – Pacific, NW – Northwest

bold – Qualified for playoffs; p – Won Presidents' Trophy; y – Won division

== Playoffs ==
In a rematch of the previous playoff season, Colorado defeated the Kings in the first round in seven games.

== Schedule and results ==
=== Regular season ===
2001–02 regular season
October: 3–7–1–2 (home: 1–2–1–1; road: 2–5–0–1)

Game	Date	Score	Opponent	Record	Recap
1	October 4, 2001	2–2 OT	Phoenix Coyotes (2001–02)	0–0–1–0	T
2	October 7, 2001	3–4	Minnesota Wild (2001–02)	0–1–1–0	L
3	October 9, 2001	1–2	@ Dallas Stars (2001–02)	0–2–1–0	L
4	October 11, 2001	6–5	@ St. Louis Blues (2001–02)	1–2–1–0	W
5	October 13, 2001	0–1	Tampa Bay Lightning (2001–02)	1–3–1–0	L
6	October 16, 2001	2–3 OT	Washington Capitals (2001–02)	1–3–1–1	OTL
7	October 18, 2001	4–1	Mighty Ducks of Anaheim (2001–02)	2–3–1–1	W
8	October 20, 2001	2–3	@ Detroit Red Wings (2001–02)	2–4–1–1	L
9	October 23, 2001	7–1	@ Columbus Blue Jackets (2001–02)	3–4–1–1	W
10	October 25, 2001	0–3	@ Tampa Bay Lightning (2001–02)	3–5–1–1	L
11	October 26, 2001	2–3	@ Florida Panthers (2001–02)	3–6–1–1	L
12	October 28, 2001	2–3 OT	@ Carolina Hurricanes (2001–02)	3–6–1–2	OTL
13	October 30, 2001	1–5	@ Chicago Blackhawks (2001–02)	3–7–1–2	L

November: 4–5–2–0 (home: 3–4–0–0; road: 1–1–2–0)

Game	Date	Score	Opponent	Record	Recap
14	November 1, 2001	2–3	Chicago Blackhawks (2001–02)	3–8–1–2	L
15	November 3, 2001	4–1	Atlanta Thrashers (2001–02)	4–8–1–2	W
16	November 8, 2001	2–3	Calgary Flames (2001–02)	4–9–1–2	L
17	November 10, 2001	3–2 OT	Detroit Red Wings (2001–02)	5–9–1–2	W
18	November 15, 2001	3–4	Dallas Stars (2001–02)	5–10–1–2	L
19	November 17, 2001	2–4	@ Detroit Red Wings (2001–02)	5–11–1–2	L
20	November 18, 2001	2–2 OT	@ Minnesota Wild (2001–02)	5–11–2–2	T
21	November 20, 2001	5–5 OT	@ Calgary Flames (2001–02)	5–11–3–2	T
22	November 22, 2001	4–2	@ Edmonton Oilers (2001–02)	6–11–3–2	W
23	November 24, 2001	3–1	San Jose Sharks (2001–02)	7–11–3–2	W
24	November 29, 2001	1–3	Edmonton Oilers (2001–02)	7–12–3–2	L

December: 7–4–4–0 (home: 3–2–2–0; road: 4–2–2–0)

Game	Date	Score	Opponent	Record	Recap
25	December 1, 2001	4–2	Nashville Predators (2001–02)	8–12–3–2	W
26	December 3, 2001	0–2	Calgary Flames (2001–02)	8–13–3–2	L
27	December 6, 2001	1–1 OT	St. Louis Blues (2001–02)	8–13–4–2	T
28	December 8, 2001	0–2	@ St. Louis Blues (2001–02)	8–14–4–2	L
29	December 9, 2001	5–2	@ Chicago Blackhawks (2001–02)	9–14–4–2	W
30	December 11, 2001	1–1 OT	@ Nashville Predators (2001–02)	9–14–5–2	T
31	December 13, 2001	6–3	Vancouver Canucks (2001–02)	10–14–5–2	W
32	December 15, 2001	3–2	Columbus Blue Jackets (2001–02)	11–14–5–2	W
33	December 16, 2001	3–2 OT	@ Mighty Ducks of Anaheim (2001–02)	12–14–5–2	W
34	December 18, 2001	3–1	@ Toronto Maple Leafs (2001–02)	13–14–5–2	W
35	December 20, 2001	4–2	@ Ottawa Senators (2001–02)	14–14–5–2	W
36	December 22, 2001	1–2	@ Montreal Canadiens (2001–02)	14–15–5–2	L
37	December 26, 2001	1–1 OT	@ Phoenix Coyotes (2001–02)	14–15–6–2	T
38	December 27, 2001	2–2 OT	Mighty Ducks of Anaheim (2001–02)	14–15–7–2	T
39	December 29, 2001	4–5	New York Rangers (2001–02)	14–16–7–2	L

January: 11–3–0–0 (home: 4–2–0–0; road: 7–1–0–0)

Game	Date	Score	Opponent	Record	Recap
40	January 2, 2002	3–1	Florida Panthers (2001–02)	15–16–7–2	W
41	January 5, 2002	3–0	@ New York Islanders (2001–02)	16–16–7–2	W
42	January 7, 2002	3–2	@ New Jersey Devils (2001–02)	17–16–7–2	W
43	January 9, 2002	4–0	@ New York Rangers (2001–02)	18–16–7–2	W
44	January 10, 2002	0–5	@ Boston Bruins (2001–02)	18–17–7–2	L
45	January 12, 2002	3–2	@ San Jose Sharks (2001–02)	19–17–7–2	W
46	January 15, 2002	2–0	Nashville Predators (2001–02)	20–17–7–2	W
47	January 17, 2002	4–2	Buffalo Sabres (2001–02)	21–17–7–2	W
48	January 19, 2002	2–3	New York Islanders (2001–02)	21–18–7–2	L
49	January 21, 2002	4–2	@ Mighty Ducks of Anaheim (2001–02)	22–18–7–2	W
50	January 24, 2002	4–1	Minnesota Wild (2001–02)	23–18–7–2	W
51	January 26, 2002	2–4	Colorado Avalanche (2001–02)	23–19–7–2	L
52	January 28, 2002	6–4	@ Colorado Avalanche (2001–02)	24–19–7–2	W
53	January 30, 2002	2–0	@ Minnesota Wild (2001–02)	25–19–7–2	W

February: 4–1–1–1 (home: 2–1–1–0; road: 2–0–0–1)

Game	Date	Score	Opponent	Record	Recap
54	February 4, 2002	1–3	Philadelphia Flyers (2001–02)	25–20–7–2	L
55	February 7, 2002	2–1	Carolina Hurricanes (2001–02)	26–20–7–2	W
56	February 8, 2002	5–6 OT	@ Phoenix Coyotes (2001–02)	26–20–7–3	OTL
57	February 11, 2002	2–1	Dallas Stars (2001–02)	27–20–7–3	W
58	February 13, 2002	2–2 OT	Phoenix Coyotes (2001–02)	27–20–8–3	T
59	February 26, 2002	5–1	@ Columbus Blue Jackets (2001–02)	28–20–8–3	W
60	February 27, 2002	5–4	@ Pittsburgh Penguins (2001–02)	29–20–8–3	W

March: 7–5–2–1 (home: 5–1–1–0; road: 2–4–1–1)

Game	Date	Score	Opponent	Record	Recap
61	March 2, 2002	0–2	Columbus Blue Jackets (2001–02)	29–21–8–3	L
62	March 4, 2002	1–1 OT	Ottawa Senators (2001–02)	29–21–9–3	T
63	March 6, 2002	2–3 OT	@ Dallas Stars (2001–02)	29–21–9–4	OTL
64	March 7, 2002	3–2	@ Nashville Predators (2001–02)	30–21–9–4	W
65	March 9, 2002	3–4	@ Colorado Avalanche (2001–02)	30–22–9–4	L
66	March 11, 2002	2–1	Chicago Blackhawks (2001–02)	31–22–9–4	W
67	March 14, 2002	2–1	St. Louis Blues (2001–02)	32–22–9–4	W
68	March 16, 2002	4–3	Pittsburgh Penguins (2001–02)	33–22–9–4	W
69	March 18, 2002	3–2	@ San Jose Sharks (2001–02)	34–22–9–4	W
70	March 21, 2002	3–1	Colorado Avalanche (2001–02)	35–22–9–4	W
71	March 23, 2002	3–0	San Jose Sharks (2001–02)	36–22–9–4	W
72	March 24, 2002	0–4	@ Phoenix Coyotes (2001–02)	36–23–9–4	L
73	March 26, 2002	0–4	@ Vancouver Canucks (2001–02)	36–24–9–4	L
74	March 28, 2002	2–2 OT	@ Edmonton Oilers (2001–02)	36–24–10–4	T
75	March 30, 2002	3–5	@ Calgary Flames (2001–02)	36–25–10–4	L

April: 4–2–1–0 (home: 4–0–1–0; road: 0–2–0–0)

Game	Date	Score	Opponent	Record	Recap
76	April 2, 2002	4–4 OT	Vancouver Canucks (2001–02)	36–25–11–4	T
77	April 4, 2002	3–0	Detroit Red Wings (2001–02)	37–25–11–4	W
78	April 6, 2002	4–3 OT	Edmonton Oilers (2001–02)	38–25–11–4	W
79	April 8, 2002	3–0	Dallas Stars (2001–02)	39–25–11–4	W
80	April 11, 2002	2–5	@ Vancouver Canucks (2001–02)	39–26–11–4	L
81	April 13, 2002	1–3	@ San Jose Sharks (2001–02)	39–27–11–4	L
82	April 14, 2002	1–0	Mighty Ducks of Anaheim (2001–02)	40–27–11–4	W

Legend: W Win (2 points) L Loss (0 points) T Tie (1 point) OTL Overtime loss (1 point)

=== Playoffs ===
2002 Stanley Cup playoffs
Western Conference Quarterfinals vs. (2) Colorado Avalanche – Avalanche win 4–3

Game	Date	Score	Opponent	Series	Recap
1	April 18, 2002	3–4	@ Colorado Avalanche	Avalanche lead 1–0	L
2	April 20, 2002	3–5	@ Colorado Avalanche	Avalanche lead 2–0	L
3	April 22, 2002	3–1	Colorado Avalanche	Avalanche lead 2–1	W
4	April 23, 2002	0–1	Colorado Avalanche	Avalanche lead 3–1	L
5	April 25, 2002	1–0 OT	@ Colorado Avalanche	Avalanche lead 3–2	W
6	April 27, 2002	3–1	Colorado Avalanche	Series tied 3–3	W
7	April 29, 2002	0–4	@ Colorado Avalanche	Avalanche win 4–3	L

Legend: W Win L Loss

== Player statistics ==
=== Scoring ===
- Position abbreviations: C = Center; D = Defense; G = Goaltender; LW = Left wing; RW = Right wing
- † = Joined team via a transaction (e.g., trade, waivers, signing) during the season. Stats reflect time with the Kings only.
- ‡ = Left team via a transaction (e.g., trade, waivers, release) during the season. Stats reflect time with the Kings only.

No.	Player	Pos	Regular season						Playoffs					
No.	Player	Pos	GP	G	A	Pts	+/-	PIM	GP	G	A	Pts	+/-	PIM
41	Jason Allison†	C	73	19	55	74	2	68	7	3	3	6	2	4
28	Adam Deadmarsh	RW	76	29	33	62	8	71	4	1	3	4	0	2
33	Zigmund Palffy	RW	63	32	27	59	5	26	7	4	5	9	4	0
44	Jaroslav Modry	D	80	4	38	42	−4	65	7	0	2	2	1	0
21	Bryan Smolinski	C	80	13	25	38	7	56	7	2	0	2	−1	2
57	Steve Heinze	RW	73	15	16	31	−15	46	4	0	0	0	−1	2
43	Philippe Boucher	D	80	7	23	30	0	94	5	0	1	1	2	2
10	Mathieu Schneider	D	55	7	23	30	3	68	7	0	1	1	−8	18
23	Craig Johnson	LW	72	13	14	27	14	24	7	1	2	3	3	2
25	Eric Belanger	C	53	8	16	24	2	21	7	0	0	0	−5	4
22	Ian Laperriere	RW	81	8	14	22	5	125	7	0	1	1	−5	9
17	Lubomir Visnovsky	D	72	4	17	21	−5	14	4	0	1	1	1	0
42	Mikko Eloranta†	LW	71	9	9	18	0	54	7	1	1	2	−1	2
3	Aaron Miller	D	74	5	12	17	14	54	7	0	0	0	1	0
29	Brad Chartrand	C	46	7	9	16	5	40	7	1	1	2	0	2
9	Kelly Buchberger	RW	74	6	7	13	−13	105	7	0	0	0	−3	7
27	Glen Murray‡	RW	9	6	5	11	5	0	—	—	—	—	—	—
14	Mattias Norstrom	D	79	2	9	11	−2	38	7	0	0	0	0	4
19	Nelson Emerson	RW	41	5	2	7	−8	25	5	0	1	1	1	2
26	Randy Robitaille‡	C	18	4	3	7	−9	17	—	—	—	—	—	—
27 (Note: Bednar wore number 7 until Ronning was acquired.)	Jaroslav Bednar	RW	22	4	2	6	−4	8	3	0	0	0	0	0
6	Andreas Lilja	D	26	1	4	5	3	22	5	0	0	0	−1	6
7	Cliff Ronning†	C/RW	14	1	4	5	0	8	4	0	1	1	−1	2
15	Jozef Stumpel‡	C	9	1	3	4	1	4	—	—	—	—	—	—
12	Ken Belanger	LW	43	2	0	2	−5	85	—	—	—	—	—	—
24	Adam Mair	C	18	1	1	2	1	57	—	—	—	—	—	—
38	Rob Valicevic	RW	17	1	1	2	−4	8	—	—	—	—	—	—
8	Jere Karalahti‡	D	30	0	1	1	−5	29	—	—	—	—	—	—
11	Steve Kelly	C	8	0	1	1	−1	2	1	0	0	0	0	0
39	Felix Potvin	G	71	0	1	1		19	7	0	0	0		0
37	Kip Brennan	LW	4	0	0	0	1	22	—	—	—	—	—	—
15	Ted Donato†‡†	LW	2	0	0	0	−2	2	—	—	—	—	—	—
49	Ryan Flinn†	LW	10	0	0	0	0	51	—	—	—	—	—	—
53	Jason Holland	D	3	0	0	0	−1	0	—	—	—	—	—	—
1	Jamie Storr	G	19	0	0	0		4	1	0	0	0		0

=== Goaltending ===
No.	Player	Regular season										Playoffs								
No.	Player	GP	W	L	T	SA	GA	GAA	SV%	SO	TOI	GP	W	L	SA	GA	GAA	SV%	SO	TOI
29	Felix Potvin	71	31	27	8	1686	157	2.31	.907	6	4071	7	3	4	201	15	2.16	.925	1	417
1	Jamie Storr	19	9	4	3	360	28	1.90	.922	2	886	1	0	0	0	0	0.00		0	1

== Awards and records ==
=== Awards ===
Type	Award/honor	Recipient	Ref
League (in-season)	NHL All-Star Game selection	Jaroslav Modry	
League (in-season)	NHL All-Star Game selection	Zigmund Palffy	
Team	Best Newcomer	Jason Allison	
Team	Bill Libby Memorial Award	Jason Allison	
Team	Defensive Player	Aaron Miller	
Team	Jim Fox Community Service	Jamie Storr	
Team	Leading Scorer	Jason Allison	
Team	Most Inspirational	Zigmund Palffy	
Team	Most Popular Player	Adam Deadmarsh	
Team	Outstanding Defenseman	Aaron Miller	
Team	Unsung Hero	Aaron Miller	

=== Milestones ===
Milestone	Player	Date	Ref
First game	Jaroslav Bednar	October 4, 2001	
First game	Kip Brennan	January 5, 2002	
First game	Ryan Flinn	January 24, 2002	
500th game played	Felix Potvin	October 16, 2001	
1,000th game played	Kelly Buchberger	January 7, 2002	
25th shutout	Felix Potvin	April 8, 2002	

== Transactions ==
The Kings were involved in the following transactions from June 10, 2001, the day after the deciding game of the 2001 Stanley Cup Final, through June 13, 2002, the day of the deciding game of the 2002 Stanley Cup Final.

=== Trades ===
Date	Details		Ref
June 24, 2001	To Los Angeles Kings: 5th-round pick in 2001	To Tampa Bay Lightning: 6th-round pick in 2001; 6th-round pick in 2001	
October 24, 2001	To Los Angeles Kings: Mikko Eloranta; Rights to Jason Allison	To Boston Bruins: Glen Murray; Jozef Stumpel	
December 18, 2001	To Los Angeles Kings: Rich Brennan	To Nashville Predators: Brett Hauer	
March 16, 2002	To Los Angeles Kings: Cliff Ronning	To Nashville Predators: Jere Karalahti; Conditional draft pick in 2003 (Note: 4th-round pick)	
March 19, 2002	To Los Angeles Kings: Conditional draft pick	To Montreal Canadiens: Stephane Fiset	

=== Players acquired ===
Date	Player	Former team	Term	Via	Ref
July 2, 2001	Ken Belanger	Boston Bruins	2-year	Free agency	
July 2, 2001	Brett Hauer	Edmonton Oilers	2-year	Free agency	
July 3, 2001	Steve Heinze	Buffalo Sabres	3-year	Free agency	
July 7, 2001	Randy Robitaille	Nashville Predators	1-year	Free agency	
August 16, 2001	Rob Valicevic	Nashville Predators	1-year	Free agency	
August 23, 2001	Jason Holland	Buffalo Sabres		Free agency	
September 25, 2001	Derek Bekar	Washington Capitals		Free agency	
January 9, 2002	Ryan Flinn	Manchester Monarchs (AHL)		Free agency	
January 30, 2002	Ted Donato	New York Islanders		Waivers	
March 19, 2002	Ted Donato	St. Louis Blues		Waivers	

=== Players lost ===
Date	Player	New team	Via (Note: In parentheses is the player's free agency group on July 1 if applicable.)	Ref
July 2, 2001	Stu Grimson	Nashville Predators	Free agency (III)	
July 2, 2001	Luc Robitaille	Detroit Red Wings	Free agency (III)	
July 13, 2001	David Hymovitz	Ottawa Senators	Free agency (UFA)	
July 18, 2001	Marko Tuomainen	New York Islanders	Free agency (UFA)	
August 8, 2001	Rich Brennan	Nashville Predators	Free agency (VI)	
September 29, 2001	Peter Leboutillier	Sheffield Steelers (BISL)	Free agency (VI)	
January 4, 2002	Randy Robitaille	Pittsburgh Penguins	Waivers	
March 6, 2002	Ted Donato	St. Louis Blues	Waivers	

=== Signings ===
Date	Player	Term	Contract type	Ref
June 28, 2001	Travis Scott	2-year	Re-signing	
June 28, 2001	Scott Thomas	1-year	Re-signing	
July 2, 2001	Mathieu Schneider	3-year	Re-signing	
July 6, 2001	Tomas Zizka	3-year	Entry-level	
July 10, 2001	Jaroslav Bednar	1-year	Entry-level	
July 10, 2001	Jaroslav Modry	2-year	Re-signing	
July 31, 2001	Marcel Cousineau	1-year	Re-signing	
July 31, 2001	Andreas Lilja	multi-year	Re-signing	
July 31, 2001	Greg Phillips	1-year	Re-signing	
July 31, 2001	Jamie Storr	1-year	Re-signing	
August 1, 2001	Eric Belanger	1-year	Re-signing	
August 1, 2001	Philippe Boucher	1-year	Re-signing	
August 13, 2001	Bryan Smolinski	2-year	Re-signing	
August 14, 2001	Aaron Miller	2-year	Arbitration award	
September 4, 2001	Lubomir Visnovsky	multi-year	Re-signing	
September 10, 2001	Felix Potvin	1-year (Note: Club option for a second year.)	Re-signing	
October 24, 2001	Jason Allison	3-year	Re-signing	
April 9, 2002	Yanick Lehoux	3-year	Entry-level	
June 1, 2002	Jared Aulin	3-year	Entry-level	

== Draft picks ==
Los Angeles's draft picks at the 2001 NHL entry draft held at the National Car Rental Center in Sunrise, Florida.

Round	#	Player	Nationality	College/Junior/Club team (League)
1	18	Jens Karlsson	Sweden	Frolunda HC (Sweden)
1	30	Dave Steckel	United States	Ohio State University (NCAA)
2	49	Michael Cammalleri	Canada	University of Michigan (NCAA)
2	51	Jaroslav Bednar	Czech Republic	HIFK (Finland)
3	83	Henrik Juntunen	Finland	Karpat (Finland)
4	116	Richard Petiot	Canada	Camrose Kodiaks (AJHL)
5	152	Terry Denike	Canada	Weyburn Red Wings (SJHL)
5	153	Tuukka Mantyla	Finland	Tappara (Finland)
7	214	Cristobal Huet	France	HC Lugano (Switzerland)
8	237	Mike Gabinet	Canada	University of Nebraska at Omaha (NCAA)
9	277	Sebastien Laplante	Canada	Rayside-Balfour Sabrecats (NOJHL)
