= 2001–02 Mighty Ducks of Anaheim season =

NHL team season

2001–02 Mighty Ducks of Anaheim
- Division: 5th Pacific
- Conference: 13th Western
- 2001–02 record: 29–42–8–3
- Home record: 15–19–5–2
- Road record: 14–23–3–1
- Goals for: 175
- Goals against: 198

Team information
- General manager: Pierre Gauthier
- Coach: Bryan Murray
- Captain: Paul Kariya
- Alternate captains: Dan Bylsma; Steve Rucchin; Oleg Tverdovsky
- Arena: Arrowhead Pond
- Average attendance: 12,002 (69.9%); Total: 492,089
- Minor league affiliate: Cincinnati Mighty Ducks

Team leaders
- Goals: Paul Kariya (32)
- Assists: Matt Cullen (30)
- Points: Paul Kariya (57)
- Penalty minutes: Kevin Sawyer (221)
- Plus/minus: Keith Carney (+14)
- Wins: Jean-Sebastien Giguere (20)
- Goals against average: Jean-Sebastien Giguere (2.13)

The 2001–02 Mighty Ducks of Anaheim season was the Ducks' ninth season in the National Hockey League (NHL). For the third straight year, the Mighty Ducks failed to qualify for the playoffs.

== Off-season ==
Bryan Murray was hired as the team’s new head coach on May 25, 2001.

The Ducks only made a few moves that summer after making a lot of roster moves in early 2001 acquiring Keith Carney from Phoenix for a 2001 second round draft pick on June 19, signing defenseman Jason York and enforcer Denny Lambert rejoining the franchise on July 2 for 2002 eighth round draft pick.

== Regular season ==
The season after trading Teemu Selanne to the Sharks did not see the Mighty Ducks improve their scoring depth as the team was second to last in the west with 175 goals. Trying to fill this void the scoring of Mike Leclerc and Matt Cullen improved and Jeff Friesen delivered the scoring expected from him, it was not enough. German Titov, while improving could still not live up to the expectations. Marty McInnis rebound season in 2000–2001 had the Mighty Ducks hoping for another 20 goal season but ended up with only 9 goals before getting traded to Boston. After missing almost all of last season, Steve Rucchin missed the first half of this season appearing in only 38 games while still recovering from the face injury he sustained. The Mighty Ducks also heavily struggled on the power play during the regular season, finishing 30th overall in power-play percentage, at 11.53% (43 for 373). Their defense and goaltending improved considerably, allowing only 198 goals (245 the season before). Giguere settled in nicely as the new number one, winning 20 games, while Steve Shields served as a solid backup.

=== Final standings ===
Pacific Division
No.	CR		GP	W	L	T	OTL	GF	GA	Pts
1	3	**San Jose Sharks**	82	44	27	8	3	248	189	99
2	6	**Phoenix Coyotes**	82	40	27	9	6	228	210	95
3	7	**Los Angeles Kings**	82	40	27	11	4	214	190	95
4	10	Dallas Stars	82	36	28	13	5	215	213	90
5	13	Mighty Ducks of Anaheim	82	29	42	8	3	175	198	69

Note: CR = Conference rank; GP = Games played; W = Wins; L = Losses; T = Ties; OTL = Overtime loss; GF = Goals for; GA = Goals against; Pts = Points
Bolded teams qualified for the playoffs.

Western Conference
R		Div	GP	W	L	T	OTL	GF	GA	Pts
**1**	**p – Detroit Red Wings**	**CEN**	**82**	**51**	**17**	**10**	**4**	**251**	**187**	**116**
**2**	**y – Colorado Avalanche**	**NW**	**82**	**45**	**28**	**8**	**1**	**212**	**169**	**99**
**3**	**y – San Jose Sharks**	**PAC**	**82**	**44**	**27**	**8**	**3**	**248**	**199**	**99**
**4**	**St. Louis Blues**	**CEN**	**82**	**43**	**27**	**8**	**4**	**227**	**188**	**98**
**5**	**Chicago Blackhawks**	**CEN**	**82**	**41**	**27**	**13**	**1**	**216**	**207**	**96**
**6**	**Phoenix Coyotes**	**PAC**	**82**	**40**	**27**	**9**	**6**	**228**	**210**	**95**
**7**	**Los Angeles Kings**	**PAC**	**82**	**40**	**27**	**11**	**4**	**214**	**190**	**95**
**8**	**Vancouver Canucks**	**NW**	**82**	**42**	**30**	**7**	**3**	**254**	**211**	**94**
8.5
9	Edmonton Oilers	NW	82	38	28	12	4	205	182	92
10	Dallas Stars	PAC	82	36	28	13	5	215	213	90
11	Calgary Flames	NW	82	32	35	12	3	201	220	79
12	Minnesota Wild	NW	82	26	35	12	9	195	238	73
13	Mighty Ducks of Anaheim	PAC	82	29	42	8	3	175	198	69
14	Nashville Predators	CEN	82	28	41	13	0	196	230	69
15	Columbus Blue Jackets	CEN	82	22	47	8	5	164	255	57

Divisions: CEN – Central, PAC – Pacific, NW – Northwest

bold – Qualified for playoffs; p – Won Presidents' Trophy; y – Won division

== Schedule and results ==
2001–02 regular season
October: 4–7–1–0 (home: 2–3–1–0; road: 2–4–0–0)

Game	Date	Score	Opponent	Record	Recap
1	October 4, 2001	2–4	@ Boston Bruins	0–1–0–0	L
2	October 6, 2001	4–2	@ Pittsburgh Penguins	1–1–0–0	W
3	October 8, 2001	1–6	@ Toronto Maple Leafs	1–2–0–0	L
4	October 9, 2001	1–3	@ Montreal Canadiens	1–3–0–0	L
5	October 12, 2001	2–1	Washington Capitals	2–3–0–0	W
6	October 14, 2001	2–3	Tampa Bay Lightning	2–4–0–0	L
7	October 17, 2001	2–2 OT	Boston Bruins	2–4–1–0	T
8	October 18, 2001	1–4	@ Los Angeles Kings	2–5–1–0	L
9	October 21, 2001	3–1	Vancouver Canucks	3–5–1–0	W
10	October 24, 2001	3–2 OT	@ Phoenix Coyotes	4–5–1–0	W
11	October 28, 2001	2–3	Colorado Avalanche	4–6–1–0	L
12	October 31, 2001	2–4	San Jose Sharks	4–7–1–0	L

November: 3–9–2–0 (home: 2–4–2–0; road: 1–5–0–0)

Game	Date	Score	Opponent	Record	Recap
13	November 2, 2001	5–2	Chicago Blackhawks	5–7–1–0	W
14	November 4, 2001	5–0	Atlanta Thrashers	6–7–1–0	W
15	November 7, 2001	3–3 OT	Calgary Flames	6–7–2–0	T
16	November 9, 2001	0–1	Detroit Red Wings	6–8–2–0	L
17	November 11, 2001	2–2 OT	Dallas Stars	6–8–3–0	T
18	November 14, 2001	2–4	San Jose Sharks	6–9–3–0	L
19	November 16, 2001	2–3	@ Columbus Blue Jackets	6–10–3–0	L
20	November 17, 2001	1–4	@ Washington Capitals	6–11–3–0	L
21	November 20, 2001	2–3	@ Tampa Bay Lightning	6–12–3–0	L
22	November 21, 2001	0–6	@ Florida Panthers	6–13–3–0	L
23	November 24, 2001	3–5	@ New York Islanders	6–14–3–0	L
24	November 25, 2001	3–2	@ New York Rangers	7–14–3–0	W
25	November 28, 2001	0–2	Edmonton Oilers	7–15–3–0	L
26	November 30, 2001	2–5	San Jose Sharks	7–16–3–0	L

December: 6–5–2–3 (home: 2–1–0–2; road: 4–4–2–1)

Game	Date	Score	Opponent	Record	Recap
27	December 2, 2001	4–2	Nashville Predators	8–16–3–0	W
28	December 5, 2001	2–3 OT	@ Edmonton Oilers	8–16–3–1	OTL
29	December 6, 2001	2–3	@ Vancouver Canucks	8–17–3–1	L
30	December 8, 2001	4–0	@ Calgary Flames	9–17–3–1	W
31	December 10, 2001	1–1 OT	@ Colorado Avalanche	9–17–4–1	T
32	December 12, 2001	0–1 OT	Vancouver Canucks	9–17–4–2	OTL
33	December 14, 2001	2–3	Columbus Blue Jackets	9–18–4–2	L
34	December 16, 2001	2–3 OT	Los Angeles Kings	9–18–4–3	OTL
35	December 18, 2001	5–1	@ Minnesota Wild	10–18–4–3	W
36	December 19, 2001	1–2	@ Colorado Avalanche	10–19–4–3	L
37	December 21, 2001	2–1	Phoenix Coyotes	11–19–4–3	W
38	December 23, 2001	4–0	@ Phoenix Coyotes	12–19–4–3	W
39	December 26, 2001	2–1	@ San Jose Sharks	13–19–4–3	W
40	December 27, 2001	2–2 OT	@ Los Angeles Kings	13–19–5–3	T
41	December 30, 2001	1–2	@ Chicago Blackhawks	13–20–5–3	L
42	December 31, 2001	1–3	@ Columbus Blue Jackets	13–21–5–3	L

January: 6–8–1–0 (home: 3–4–0–0; road: 3–4–1–0)

Game	Date	Score	Opponent	Record	Recap
43	January 2, 2002	3–5	@ Detroit Red Wings	13–22–5–3	L
44	January 4, 2002	1–2	Florida Panthers	13–23–5–3	L
45	January 9, 2002	2–3	St. Louis Blues	13–24–5–3	L
46	January 11, 2002	2–2 OT	@ Minnesota Wild	13–24–6–3	T
47	January 12, 2002	1–2	@ Nashville Predators	13–25–6–3	L
48	January 14, 2002	5–3	Nashville Predators	14–25–6–3	W
49	January 16, 2002	1–3	Buffalo Sabres	14–26–6–3	L
50	January 18, 2002	1–3	@ Edmonton Oilers	14–27–6–3	L
51	January 19, 2002	1–2	@ Calgary Flames	14–28–6–3	L
52	January 21, 2002	2–4	Los Angeles Kings	14–29–6–3	L
53	January 23, 2002	3–2 OT	Minnesota Wild	15–29–6–3	W
54	January 25, 2002	6–1	@ Dallas Stars	16–29–6–3	W
55	January 26, 2002	3–1	@ Nashville Predators	17–29–6–3	W
56	January 28, 2002	1–0	@ St. Louis Blues	18–29–6–3	W
57	January 30, 2002	3–1	Columbus Blue Jackets	19–29–6–3	W

February: 2–3–0–0 (home: 2–3–0–0; road: 0–0–0–0)

Game	Date	Score	Opponent	Record	Recap
58	February 6, 2002	5–4	Philadelphia Flyers	20–29–6–3	W
59	February 8, 2002	1–4	Carolina Hurricanes	20–30–6–3	L
60	February 10, 2002	1–5	Dallas Stars	20–31–6–3	L
61	February 13, 2002	3–2	Calgary Flames	21–31–6–3	W
62	February 27, 2002	3–5	Minnesota Wild	21–32–6–3	L

March: 6–7–1–0 (home: 2–3–1–0; road: 4–4–0–0)

Game	Date	Score	Opponent	Record	Recap
63	March 3, 2002	1–2	@ Chicago Blackhawks	21–33–6–3	L
64	March 6, 2002	4–1	@ Atlanta Thrashers	22–33–6–3	W
65	March 8, 2002	2–1	New Jersey Devils	23–33–6–3	W
66	March 10, 2002	2–4	Ottawa Senators	23–34–6–3	L
67	March 13, 2002	4–2	Pittsburgh Penguins	24–34–6–3	W
68	March 15, 2002	1–1 OT	Chicago Blackhawks	24–34–7–3	T
69	March 17, 2002	2–3	St. Louis Blues	24–35–7–3	L
70	March 19, 2002	2–1	@ Detroit Red Wings	25–35–7–3	W
71	March 21, 2002	1–2	@ Philadelphia Flyers	25–36–7–3	L
72	March 22, 2002	2–3	@ St. Louis Blues	25–37–7–3	L
73	March 24, 2002	2–1	@ Dallas Stars	26–37–7–3	W
74	March 27, 2002	2–4	Phoenix Coyotes	26–38–7–3	L
75	March 28, 2002	2–1 OT	@ Phoenix Coyotes	27–38–7–3	W
76	March 30, 2002	1–4	@ Vancouver Canucks	27–39–7–3	L

April: 2–3–1–0 (home: 2–1–1–0; road: 0–2–0–0)

Game	Date	Score	Opponent	Record	Recap
77	April 2, 2002	1–3	@ San Jose Sharks	27–40–7–3	L
78	April 3, 2002	1–1 OT	Detroit Red Wings	27–40–8–3	T
79	April 5, 2002	2–0	Edmonton Oilers	28–40–8–3	W
80	April 7, 2002	4–1	Dallas Stars	29–40–8–3	W
81	April 12, 2002	1–3	Colorado Avalanche	29–41–8–3	L
82	April 14, 2002	0–1	@ Los Angeles Kings	29–42–8–3	L

Legend: W Win (2 points) L Loss (0 points) T Tie (1 point) OTL Overtime loss (1 point)

== Player statistics ==
=== Scoring ===
- Position abbreviations: C = Center; D = Defense; G = Goaltender; LW = Left wing; RW = Right wing
- † = Joined team via a transaction (e.g., trade, waivers, signing) during the season. Stats reflect time with the Mighty Ducks only.
- ‡ = Left team via a transaction (e.g., trade, waivers, release) during the season. Stats reflect time with the Mighty Ducks only.

No.	Player	Pos	Regular season					
No.	Player	Pos	GP	G	A	Pts	+/-	PIM
9	Paul Kariya	RW	82	32	25	57	−15	28
17	Matt Cullen	C	79	18	30	48	−1	24
12	Mike Leclerc	LW	82	20	24	44	−12	107
11	Jeff Friesen	RW	81	17	26	43	−1	44
10	Oleg Tverdovsky	D	73	6	26	32	0	31
19	Andy McDonald	C	53	7	21	28	2	31
13	German Titov	LW	66	13	14	27	4	36
33	Jason York	D	74	5	20	25	−11	60
16	Marty McInnis‡	RW	60	9	14	23	−14	25
20	Steve Rucchin	C	38	7	16	23	−3	6
26	Samuel Pahlsson	C	80	6	14	20	−16	26
21	Dan Bylsma	RW	77	8	9	17	5	28
18	Patric Kjellberg†	LW	65	7	8	15	−9	10
3	Keith Carney	D	60	5	9	14	14	30
7	Pavel Trnka	D	71	2	11	13	−5	66
24	Ruslan Salei	D	82	4	7	11	−10	97
32	Marc Chouinard	C	45	4	5	9	2	10
27	Denny Lambert	LW	73	2	5	7	1	213
28	Niclas Havelid	D	52	1	2	3	−13	40
23	Sergei Krivokrasov†	RW	17	1	2	3	−1	19
29	Timo Parssinen	LW	17	0	3	3	0	2
5	Vitaly Vishnevsky	D	74	0	3	3	−10	60
25	Kevin Sawyer	LW	57	1	1	2	−4	221
36	Drew Bannister	D	1	0	0	0	0	0
37	Aris Brimanis	D	5	0	0	0	−1	0
30	Ilya Bryzgalov	G	1	0	0	0		0
15	Jim Cummins‡	RW	2	0	0	0	−1	0
35	Jean-Sebastien Giguere	G	53	0	0	0		28
4	Antti-Jussi Niemi	D	1	0	0	0	−1	0
31	Steve Shields	G	33	0	0	0		4
18	Petr Tenkrat‡	RW	9	0	0	0	−6	6

=== Goaltending ===
No.	Player	Regular season									
No.	Player	GP	W	L	T	SA	GA	GAA	SV%	SO	TOI
35	Jean-Sebastien Giguere	53	20	25	6	1384	111	2.13	.920	4	3127
31	Steve Shields	33	9	20	2	850	79	2.67	.907	0	1777
30	Ilya Bryzgalov	1	0	0	0	12	1	1.87	.917	0	32

== Awards and records ==
=== Awards ===
Type	Award/honor	Recipient	Ref
League (in-season)	NHL All-Star Game selection	Paul Kariya	

=== Milestones ===
Milestone	Player	Date	Ref
First game	Timo Parssinen	October 4, 2001	
First game	Ilya Bryzgalov	October 8, 2001	
500th coaching win	Bryan Murray	January 25, 2002	

== Transactions ==
The Mighty Ducks were involved in the following transactions from June 10, 2001, the day after the deciding game of the 2001 Stanley Cup Final, through June 13, 2002, the day of the deciding game of the 2002 Stanley Cup Final.

=== Trades ===
Date	Details		Ref
June 19, 2001	To Mighty Ducks of Anaheim: Keith Carney	To Phoenix Coyotes: 2nd-round pick in 2001	
July 2, 2001	To Mighty Ducks of Anaheim: Denny Lambert	To Atlanta Thrashers: Future considerations	
November 1, 2001	To Mighty Ducks of Anaheim: Patric Kjellberg	To Nashville Predators: Petr Tenkrat	
November 1, 2001	To Mighty Ducks of Anaheim: Sergei Krivokrasov	To Minnesota Wild: 7th-round pick in 2002; Future considerations	
December 4, 2001	To Mighty Ducks of Anaheim: Bert Robertsson	To Nashville Predators: Jay Legault	
January 15, 2002	To Mighty Ducks of Anaheim: Dave Roche	To New York Islanders: Jim Cummins	
March 5, 2002	To Mighty Ducks of Anaheim: 3rd-round pick in 2002	To Boston Bruins: Marty McInnis	
March 8, 2002	To Mighty Ducks of Anaheim: Mark Moore	To Pittsburgh Penguins: Bert Robertsson	
March 18, 2002	To Mighty Ducks of Anaheim: Ben Guite; Rights to Bjorn Melin	To New York Islanders: Dave Roche	

=== Players acquired ===
Date	Player	Former team	Term	Via	Ref
July 3, 2001	Jason York	Ottawa Senators	3-year	Free agency	
July 27, 2001	Drew Bannister	New York Rangers	1-year	Free agency	
August 1, 2001	Aris Brimanis	New York Islanders	1-year	Free agency	
August 14, 2001	Brian White	Colorado Avalanche	1-year (Note: Club option for a second year.)	Free agency	
June 6, 2002	Kurt Sauer	Spokane Chiefs (WHL)	3-year	Free agency	
June 11, 2002	Travis Brigley	Cincinnati Mighty Ducks (AHL)	2-year	Free agency	

=== Players lost ===
Date	Player	New team	Via (Note: In parentheses is the player's free agency group on July 1 if applicable.)	Ref
June 22, 2001	Chris O'Sullivan	Kloten Flyers (NLA)	Free agency (VI)	
July 1, 2001	Dean Malkoc (Note: Malkoc was inactive during the 2001–02, 2002–03, and 2003–04 seasons.)		Contract expiration (UFA)	
July 1, 2001	Tony Mohagen (Note: Mohagen, who last played during the 1998–99 season, retired.)		Contract expiration (UFA)	
July 16, 2001	Tony Hrkac	Atlanta Thrashers	Free agency (III)	
July 24, 2001	Bob Wren	Toronto Maple Leafs	Free agency (VI)	
July 25, 2001	Mike Crowley	Minnesota Wild	Free agency (VI)	
September 6, 2001	Pascal Trepanier	Colorado Avalanche	Free agency (UFA)	
October 16, 2001	Scott Langkow	Kalamazoo Wings (UHL)	Free agency (VI)	
October 30, 2001	Alexei Tezikov	Vancouver Canucks	Waivers	
April 25, 2002	Jonas Ronnqvist	Lulea HF (SHL)	Free agency	
April 26, 2002	Timo Parssinen	HIFK (Liiga)	Free agency (Note: Anaheim retained Parssinen’s NHL rights through the 2005–06 season.)	

=== Signings ===
Date	Player	Term	Contract type	Ref
June 11, 2001	Dan Bylsma	1-year	Option exercised	
June 11, 2001	Jim Cummins	1-year	Option exercised	
June 14, 2001	Steve Shields	1-year	Option exercised	
July 12, 2001	Timo Parssinen	1-year	Entry-level	
July 15, 2001	Ilya Bryzgalov	3-year	Entry-level	
July 20, 2001	Mike Leclerc	2-year	Re-signing	
July 30, 2001	Marc Chouinard	1-year	Re-signing	
July 31, 2001	Matt Cullen	1-year	Re-signing	
July 31, 2001	Gregg Naumenko	1-year	Re-signing	
August 17, 2001	Jean-Sebastien Giguere	2-year	Re-signing	
August 23, 2001	Jeff Friesen	2-year	Re-signing	
September 5, 2001	Niclas Havelid	2-year	Re-signing	
June 6, 2002	Mark Popovic	3-year	Entry-level	
June 11, 2002	Jonathan Hedstrom	1-year	Entry-level	

== Draft picks ==
Anaheim's draft picks at the 2001 NHL entry draft held at the National Car Rental Center in Sunrise, Florida.

Round	Pick	Player	Position	Nationality	College/Junior/Club team (League)
1	5	Stanislav Chistov	Left wing	Russia	Avangard Omsk (RUS)
2	35	Mark Popovic	Defense	Canada	Toronto St. Michael's Majors (OHL)
3	69	Joel Stepp	Left wing	Canada	Red Deer Rebels (WHL)
4	102	Timo Parssinen	Center	Finland	HPK (Finland)
4	105	Vladimir Korsunov	Defense	Russia	Spartak Moscow (Russia)
4	118	Brandon Rogers	Defense	United States	Hotchkiss School (USHS-CT)
5	137	Joel Perrault	Center	Canada	Baie-Comeau Drakkar (QMJHL)
6	170	Jan Tabacek	Defense	Slovakia	Martimex ZTS Martin HC (Slovakia)
7	224	Tony Martensson	Center	Sweden	Brynas IF (Sweden)
8	232	Martin Gerber	Goaltender	Switzerland	Langnau-Sui (Switzerland)
9	264	P. A. Parenteau	Left wing	Canada	Chicoutimi Sagueneens (QMJHL)

== Farm teams ==
- The Mighty Ducks farm team was the Cincinnati Mighty Ducks of the American Hockey League. The team finished third in the Central Division with a record of 32-33-11-3. The club had 216 goals scored for and 211 goals scored against. The team lost 2 games to 1 to the Chicago Wolves in the postseason.

== See also ==
- 2001–02 NHL season
