= 2001–02 St. Louis Blues season =

National Hockey League team season

2001–02 St. Louis Blues
- Division: 2nd Central
- Conference: 4th Western
- 2001–02 record: 43–27–8–4
- Home record: 27–12–1–1
- Road record: 16–15–7–3
- Goals for: 227
- Goals against: 188

Team information
- General manager: Larry Pleau
- Coach: Joel Quenneville
- Captain: Chris Pronger
- Alternate captains: Al MacInnis; Doug Weight
- Arena: Savvis Center
- Average attendance: 18,968
- Minor league affiliates: Worcester IceCats; Peoria Rivermen

Team leaders
- Goals: Keith Tkachuk (38)
- Assists: Pavol Demitra (43)
- Points: Pavol Demitra (78)
- Penalty minutes: Reed Low (160)
- Plus/minus: Chris Pronger (+23)
- Wins: Brent Johnson (34)
- Goals against average: Brent Johnson (2.18)

The 2001–02 St. Louis Blues season was the 35th for the franchise in St. Louis, Missouri. The Blues finished the regular-season with a record of 43 wins, 27 losses, 8 ties and 4 overtime losses, enough for 98 points. The Blues qualified for the playoffs for the 23rd consecutive season, and defeated the Chicago Blackhawks, four games to one, in the Western Conference Quarterfinals before losing the Western Conference Semifinals to the eventual Stanley Cup Champion Detroit Red Wings, also in five games.

== Regular season ==
=== Final standings ===
Central Division
No.	CR		GP	W	L	T	OTL	GF	GA	Pts
1	1	**Detroit Red Wings**	82	51	17	10	4	251	187	116
2	4	**St. Louis Blues**	82	43	27	8	4	227	188	98
3	5	**Chicago Blackhawks**	82	41	27	13	1	216	207	96
4	14	Nashville Predators	82	28	41	13	0	196	230	69
5	15	Columbus Blue Jackets	82	22	47	8	5	164	255	57

Note: CR = Conference rank; GP = Games played; W = Wins; L = Losses; T = Ties; OTL = Overtime loss; GF = Goals for; GA = Goals against; Pts = Points
Bolded teams qualified for the playoffs.

Western Conference
R		Div	GP	W	L	T	OTL	GF	GA	Pts
**1**	**p – Detroit Red Wings**	**CEN**	**82**	**51**	**17**	**10**	**4**	**251**	**187**	**116**
**2**	**y – Colorado Avalanche**	**NW**	**82**	**45**	**28**	**8**	**1**	**212**	**169**	**99**
**3**	**y – San Jose Sharks**	**PAC**	**82**	**44**	**27**	**8**	**3**	**248**	**199**	**99**
**4**	**St. Louis Blues**	**CEN**	**82**	**43**	**27**	**8**	**4**	**227**	**188**	**98**
**5**	**Chicago Blackhawks**	**CEN**	**82**	**41**	**27**	**13**	**1**	**216**	**207**	**96**
**6**	**Phoenix Coyotes**	**PAC**	**82**	**40**	**27**	**9**	**6**	**228**	**210**	**95**
**7**	**Los Angeles Kings**	**PAC**	**82**	**40**	**27**	**11**	**4**	**214**	**190**	**95**
**8**	**Vancouver Canucks**	**NW**	**82**	**42**	**30**	**7**	**3**	**254**	**211**	**94**
8.5
9	Edmonton Oilers	NW	82	38	28	12	4	205	182	92
10	Dallas Stars	PAC	82	36	28	13	5	215	213	90
11	Calgary Flames	NW	82	32	35	12	3	201	220	79
12	Minnesota Wild	NW	82	26	35	12	9	195	238	73
13	Mighty Ducks of Anaheim	PAC	82	29	42	8	3	175	198	69
14	Nashville Predators	CEN	82	28	41	13	0	196	230	69
15	Columbus Blue Jackets	CEN	82	22	47	8	5	164	255	57

Divisions: CEN – Central, PAC – Pacific, NW – Northwest

bold – Qualified for playoffs; p – Won Presidents' Trophy; y – Won division

== Schedule and results ==
=== Regular season ===
2001–02 regular season
October: 5–3–3–0 (home: 2–2–1–0; road: 3–1–2–0)

Game	Date	Score	Opponent	Record	Recap
1	October 4, 2001	3–3 OT	@ Columbus Blue Jackets (2001–02)	0–0–1–0	T
2	October 6, 2001	2–2 OT	@ Nashville Predators (2001–02)	0–0–2–0	T
3	October 11, 2001	5–6	Los Angeles Kings (2001–02)	0–1–2–0	L
4	October 13, 2001	5–2	@ Toronto Maple Leafs (2001–02)	1–1–2–0	W
5	October 17, 2001	2–2 OT	Dallas Stars (2001–02)	1–1–3–0	T
6	October 19, 2001	3–2 OT	@ Minnesota Wild (2001–02)	2–1–3–0	W
7	October 20, 2001	2–1 OT	Pittsburgh Penguins (2001–02)	3–1–3–0	W
8	October 22, 2001	2–3	Calgary Flames (2001–02)	3–2–3–0	L
9	October 25, 2001	5–1	New York Rangers (2001–02)	4–2–3–0	W
10	October 27, 2001	1–4	@ Ottawa Senators (2001–02)	4–3–3–0	L
11	October 31, 2001	1–0	@ Colorado Avalanche (2001–02)	5–3–3–0	W

November: 7–5–0–1 (home: 6–1–0–0; road: 1–4–0–1)

Game	Date	Score	Opponent	Record	Recap
12	November 1, 2001	4–3	Carolina Hurricanes (2001–02)	6–3–3–0	W
13	November 3, 2001	4–1	Washington Capitals (2001–02)	7–3–3–0	W
14	November 6, 2001	1–4	San Jose Sharks (2001–02)	7–4–3–0	L
15	November 8, 2001	3–1	Vancouver Canucks (2001–02)	8–4–3–0	W
16	November 10, 2001	4–1	Phoenix Coyotes (2001–02)	9–4–3–0	W
17	November 13, 2001	2–3 OT	@ Columbus Blue Jackets (2001–02)	9–4–3–1	OTL
18	November 15, 2001	1–2	@ Vancouver Canucks (2001–02)	9–5–3–1	L
19	November 17, 2001	0–2	@ Calgary Flames (2001–02)	9–6–3–1	L
20	November 20, 2001	0–2	@ Edmonton Oilers (2001–02)	9–7–3–1	L
21	November 23, 2001	1–3	@ Detroit Red Wings (2001–02)	9–8–3–1	L
22	November 24, 2001	5–3	Phoenix Coyotes (2001–02)	10–8–3–1	W
23	November 27, 2001	4–2	Ottawa Senators (2001–02)	11–8–3–1	W
24	November 29, 2001	3–1	@ Columbus Blue Jackets (2001–02)	12–8–3–1	W

December: 6–3–3–2 (home: 5–1–0–1; road: 1–2–3–1)

Game	Date	Score	Opponent	Record	Recap
25	December 1, 2001	4–3	Columbus Blue Jackets (2001–02)	13–8–3–1	W
26	December 2, 2001	4–4 OT	@ Minnesota Wild (2001–02)	13–8–4–1	T
27	December 5, 2001	0–3	@ Phoenix Coyotes (2001–02)	13–9–4–1	L
28	December 6, 2001	1–1 OT	@ Los Angeles Kings (2001–02)	13–9–5–1	T
29	December 8, 2001	2–0	Los Angeles Kings (2001–02)	14–9–5–1	W
30	December 12, 2001	2–2 OT	@ Chicago Blackhawks (2001–02)	14–9–6–1	T
31	December 13, 2001	3–4 OT	Toronto Maple Leafs (2001–02)	14–9–6–2	OTL
32	December 15, 2001	4–0	Calgary Flames (2001–02)	15–9–6–2	W
33	December 18, 2001	3–6	@ Philadelphia Flyers (2001–02)	15–10–6–2	L
34	December 21, 2001	3–4 OT	@ Tampa Bay Lightning (2001–02)	15–10–6–3	OTL
35	December 22, 2001	2–0	@ Florida Panthers (2001–02)	16–10–6–3	W
36	December 26, 2001	1–3	Chicago Blackhawks (2001–02)	16–11–6–3	L
37	December 28, 2001	3–0	Montreal Canadiens (2001–02)	17–11–6–3	W
38	December 30, 2001	7–2	Nashville Predators (2001–02)	18–11–6–3	W

January: 11–4–0–0 (home: 5–2–0–0; road: 6–2–0–0)

Game	Date	Score	Opponent	Record	Recap
39	January 1, 2002	1–2	@ New Jersey Devils (2001–02)	18–12–6–3	L
40	January 3, 2002	4–2	Columbus Blue Jackets (2001–02)	19–12–6–3	W
41	January 5, 2002	5–2	Dallas Stars (2001–02)	20–12–6–3	W
42	January 8, 2002	6–2	@ San Jose Sharks (2001–02)	21–12–6–3	W
43	January 9, 2002	3–2	@ Mighty Ducks of Anaheim (2001–02)	22–12–6–3	W
44	January 12, 2002	4–1	@ Pittsburgh Penguins (2001–02)	23–12–6–3	W
45	January 15, 2002	3–2	Edmonton Oilers (2001–02)	24–12–6–3	W
46	January 17, 2002	5–4	Vancouver Canucks (2001–02)	25–12–6–3	W
47	January 19, 2002	2–1 OT	Boston Bruins (2001–02)	26–12–6–3	W
48	January 21, 2002	4–3 OT	@ Boston Bruins (2001–02)	27–12–6–3	W
49	January 23, 2002	5–2	@ Buffalo Sabres (2001–02)	28–12–6–3	W
50	January 25, 2002	1–2	@ Chicago Blackhawks (2001–02)	28–13–6–3	L
51	January 26, 2002	2–5	Detroit Red Wings (2001–02)	28–14–6–3	L
52	January 28, 2002	0–1	Mighty Ducks of Anaheim (2001–02)	28–15–6–3	L
53	January 30, 2002	4–1	@ Washington Capitals (2001–02)	29–15–6–3	W

February: 2–4–1–0 (home: 2–1–0–0; road: 0–3–1–0)

Game	Date	Score	Opponent	Record	Recap
54	February 5, 2002	3–4	@ New York Islanders (2001–02)	29–16–6–3	L
55	February 7, 2002	3–1	Edmonton Oilers (2001–02)	30–16–6–3	W
56	February 9, 2002	0–5	Philadelphia Flyers (2001–02)	30–17–6–3	L
57	February 12, 2002	3–0	Atlanta Thrashers (2001–02)	31–17–6–3	W
58	February 13, 2002	1–3	@ Colorado Avalanche (2001–02)	31–18–6–3	L
59	February 26, 2002	4–4 OT	@ Vancouver Canucks (2001–02)	31–18–7–3	T
60	February 28, 2002	2–3	@ Calgary Flames (2001–02)	31–19–7–3	L

March: 6–6–1–1 (home: 3–4–0–0; road: 3–2–1–1)

Game	Date	Score	Opponent	Record	Recap
61	March 2, 2002	1–1 OT	@ Edmonton Oilers (2001–02)	31–19–8–3	T
62	March 7, 2002	0–3	Minnesota Wild (2001–02)	31–20–8–3	L
63	March 9, 2002	2–5	Detroit Red Wings (2001–02)	31–21–8–3	L
64	March 11, 2002	2–3	Colorado Avalanche (2001–02)	31–22–8–3	L
65	March 13, 2002	2–0	@ San Jose Sharks (2001–02)	32–22–8–3	W
66	March 14, 2002	1–2	@ Los Angeles Kings (2001–02)	32–23–8–3	L
67	March 17, 2002	3–2	@ Mighty Ducks of Anaheim (2001–02)	33–23–8–3	W
68	March 19, 2002	5–1	Nashville Predators (2001–02)	34–23–8–3	W
69	March 20, 2002	2–3	@ Dallas Stars (2001–02)	34–24–8–3	L
70	March 22, 2002	3–2	Mighty Ducks of Anaheim (2001–02)	35–24–8–3	W
71	March 24, 2002	3–4 OT	@ Chicago Blackhawks (2001–02)	35–24–8–4	OTL
72	March 26, 2002	1–2	Minnesota Wild (2001–02)	35–25–8–4	L
73	March 28, 2002	4–1	Buffalo Sabres (2001–02)	36–25–8–4	W
74	March 30, 2002	4–2	@ Nashville Predators (2001–02)	37–25–8–4	W

April: 6–2–0–0 (home: 4–1–0–0; road: 2–1–0–0)

Game	Date	Score	Opponent	Record	Recap
75	April 1, 2002	3–5	@ Phoenix Coyotes (2001–02)	37–26–8–4	L
76	April 3, 2002	2–1 OT	@ Dallas Stars (2001–02)	38–26–8–4	W
77	April 5, 2002	5–1	Chicago Blackhawks (2001–02)	39–26–8–4	W
78	April 7, 2002	2–4	Colorado Avalanche (2001–02)	39–27–8–4	L
79	April 9, 2002	3–2	Nashville Predators (2001–02)	40–27–8–4	W
80	April 11, 2002	4–1	San Jose Sharks (2001–02)	41–27–8–4	W
81	April 13, 2002	3–2 OT	Detroit Red Wings (2001–02)	42–27–8–4	W
82	April 14, 2002	5–3	@ Detroit Red Wings (2001–02)	43–27–8–4	W

Legend: W Win (2 points) L Loss (0 points) T Tie (1 point) OTL Overtime loss (1 point)

=== Playoffs ===
2002 Stanley Cup playoffs
Western Conference Quarterfinals vs. (5) Chicago Blackhawks: Blues win 4–1

Game	Date	Score	Opponent	Attendance	Series	Recap
1	April 18, 2002	1–2	Chicago Blackhawks	18,807	Blackhawks lead 1–0	L
2	April 20, 2002	2–0	Chicago Blackhawks	19,143	Series tied 1–1	W
3	April 21, 2002	4–0	@ Chicago Blackhawks	20,532	Blues lead 2–1	W
4	April 23, 2002	1–0	@ Chicago Blackhawks	18,019	Blues lead 3–1	W
5	April 25, 2002	5–3	Chicago Blackhawks	19,999	Blues win 4–1	W

Western Conference Semifinals vs. (1) Detroit Red Wings: Red Wings win 4–1

Game	Date	Score	Opponent	Attendance	Series	Recap
1	May 2, 2002	0–2	@ Detroit Red Wings	20,058	Red Wings lead 1–0	L
2	May 4, 2002	2–3	@ Detroit Red Wings	20,058	Red Wings lead 2–0	L
3	May 7, 2002	6–1	Detroit Red Wings	19,107	Red Wings lead 2–1	W
4	May 9, 2002	3–4	Detroit Red Wings	19,999	Red Wings lead 3–1	L
5	May 11, 2002	0–4	@ Detroit Red Wings	20,058	Red Wings win 4–1	L

Legend: W Win L Loss

== Player statistics ==
=== Scoring ===
- Position abbreviations: C = Center; D = Defense; G = Goaltender; LW = Left wing; RW = Right wing
- † = Joined team via a transaction (e.g., trade, waivers, signing) during the season. Stats reflect time with the Blues only.
- ‡ = Left team via a transaction (e.g., trade, waivers, release) during the season. Stats reflect time with the Blues only.

No.	Player	Pos	Regular season						Playoffs					
No.	Player	Pos	GP	G	A	Pts	+/-	PIM	GP	G	A	Pts	+/-	PIM
38	Pavol Demitra	LW	82	35	43	78	13	46	10	4	7	11	3	6
7	Keith Tkachuk	LW	73	38	37	75	21	117	10	5	5	10	1	18
39	Doug Weight	C	61	15	34	49	20	40	10	1	1	2	0	4
44	Chris Pronger	D	78	7	40	47	23	120	9	1	7	8	5	24
2	Al MacInnis	D	71	11	35	46	3	52	10	0	7	7	3	4
61 (Note: Stillman wore number 12 through November 23.)	Cory Stillman	LW	80	23	22	45	8	36	9	0	2	2	−1	2
48	Scott Young	RW	67	19	22	41	11	26	10	3	0	3	−1	2
19	Scott Mellanby	RW	64	15	26	41	−5	93	10	7	3	10	1	18
10	Dallas Drake	RW	80	11	15	26	8	87	8	0	0	0	0	8
29	Alexander Khavanov	D	81	3	21	24	9	55	4	0	0	0	0	2
21	Jamal Mayers	RW	77	9	8	17	9	99	10	3	0	3	−1	2
32	Mike Eastwood	C	71	7	10	17	−2	41	10	0	0	0	−1	6
9	Tyson Nash	LW	64	6	7	13	2	100	9	0	1	1	0	20
27	Bryce Salvador	D	66	5	7	12	3	78	10	0	1	1	−1	4
17	Sergei Varlamov	LW	52	5	7	12	4	26	1	0	0	0	0	2
15	Daniel Corso	C	41	4	7	11	3	6	2	0	0	0	0	0
13	Ray Ferraro†	C	15	6	4	10	2	8	10	0	3	3	−2	4
12 (Note: Keane wore number 25 through November 23.)	Mike Keane‡	RW	56	4	6	10	−2	22	—	—	—	—	—	—
43	Mike Van Ryn	D	48	2	8	10	10	18	9	0	0	0	−2	0
25	Shjon Podein†	LW	23	2	4	6	2	2	10	0	0	0	0	6
37	Jeff Finley	D	78	0	6	6	12	30	10	0	0	0	−1	8
34	Reed Low	RW	58	0	5	5	−3	160	—	—	—	—	—	—
35	Brent Johnson	G	58	0	4	4		2	10	0	0	0		4
4	Marc Bergevin†	D	30	0	3	3	6	2	7	0	0	0	0	4
6	Sean Hill‡	D	23	0	3	3	1	28	—	—	—	—	—	—
42	Mark Rycroft	RW	9	0	3	3	0	4	—	—	—	—	—	—
47	Rich Pilon	D	8	0	2	2	−1	9	—	—	—	—	—	—
33 (Note: Boguniecki wore number 14 during the regular season.)	Eric Boguniecki	C	8	0	1	1	−2	4	1	0	1	1	1	0
46	Christian Laflamme	D	8	0	1	1	3	4	—	—	—	—	—	—
40	Fred Brathwaite	G	25	0	0	0		0	1	0	0	0		0
30	Reinhard Divis	G	1	0	0	0		0	—	—	—	—	—	—
6	Ted Donato†‡	LW	2	0	0	0	−2	2	—	—	—	—	—	—
5	Barret Jackman	D	1	0	0	0	0	0	1	0	0	0	0	2
26	Justin Papineau	C	1	0	0	0	−2	0	—	—	—	—	—	—

=== Goaltending ===
No.	Player	Regular season										Playoffs								
No.	Player	GP	W	L	T	SA	GA	GAA	SV%	SO	TOI	GP	W	L	SA	GA	GAA	SV%	SO	TOI
35	Brent Johnson	58	34	20	4	1293	127	2.18	.902	5	3491	10	5	5	252	18	1.83	.929	3	590
40	Fred Brathwaite	25	9	11	4	543	54	2.24	.901	2	1446	1	0	0	0	0	0.00		0	1
30	Reinhard Divis	1	0	0	0	4	0	0.00	1.000	0	25	—	—	—	—	—	—	—	—	—

== Awards and records ==
=== Awards ===
Type	Award/honor	Recipient	Ref
League (annual)	Lester Patrick Trophy	Larry Pleau	
League (in-season)	NHL All-Star Game selection	Pavol Demitra	
League (in-season)	NHL All-Star Game selection	Chris Pronger (Note: Pronger was voted to the starting lineup.)	

=== Milestones ===
Milestone	Player	Date	Ref
First game	Mark Rycroft	October 4, 2001	
First game	Justin Papineau	March 7, 2002	
First game	Reinhard Divis	April 7, 2002	
First game	Barret Jackman	April 14, 2002	
1,000th game played	Mike Keane	January 17, 2002	

== Transactions ==
The Blues were involved in the following transactions from June 10, 2001, the day after the deciding game of the 2001 Stanley Cup Final, through June 13, 2002, the day of the deciding game of the 2002 Stanley Cup Final.

=== Trades ===
Date	Details		Ref
June 23, 2001	To St. Louis Blues: Fred Brathwaite; Daniel Tkaczuk; Sergei Varlamov; 9th-round pick in 2001	To Calgary Flames: Roman Turek; 4th-round pick in 2001	
June 24, 2001	To St. Louis Blues: 4th-round pick in 2001	To Atlanta Thrashers: Lubos Bartecko	
June 30, 2001	To St. Louis Blues: Michel Riesen; Doug Weight	To Edmonton Oilers: Jochen Hecht; Jan Horacek; Marty Reasoner	
December 5, 2001	To St. Louis Blues: Steven Halko; 4th-round pick in 2002	To Carolina Hurricanes: Sean Hill	
February 11, 2002	To St. Louis Blues: Shjon Podein	To Colorado Avalanche: Mike Keane	
March 18, 2002	To St. Louis Blues: Ray Ferraro	To Atlanta Thrashers: 4th-round pick in 2002	

=== Players acquired ===
Date	Player	Former team	Term	Via	Ref
July 5, 2001	Mike Keane	Dallas Stars	multi-year	Free agency	
July 5, 2001	Rich Pilon	San Jose Sharks	1-year	Free agency	
July 16, 2001	Steve McLaren	Philadelphia Flyers		Free agency	
July 17, 2001	Ed Campbell	Worcester IceCats (AHL)		Free agency	
July 26, 2001	Jamie Thompson	Worcester IceCats (AHL)		Free agency	
August 21, 2001	Christian Laflamme	Montreal Canadiens		Free agency	
November 6, 2001	Marc Bergevin	Pittsburgh Penguins		Free agency	
March 6, 2002	Ted Donato	Los Angeles Kings		Waivers	

=== Players lost ===
Date	Player	New team	Via (Note: In parentheses is the player's free agency group on July 1 if applicable.)	Ref
July 1, 2001	Alexei Gusarov (Note: Gusarov retired.)		Contract expiration (III)	
July 1, 2001	Pierre Turgeon	Dallas Stars	Free agency (III)	
July 2, 2001	Dwayne Roloson	Minnesota Wild	Free agency (III)	
July 16, 2001	Todd Reirden	Atlanta Thrashers	Free agency (UFA)	
July 31, 2001	Pascal Rheaume	Chicago Blackhawks	Free agency (UFA)	
August 1, 2001	Mike Peluso	Chicago Blackhawks	Free agency (VI)	
August 7, 2001	Chris Murray	Toronto Maple Leafs	Free agency (UFA)	
August 9, 2001	Jaroslav Obsut	Colorado Avalanche	Free agency (UFA)	
September 5, 2001	Vladimir Chebaturkin	Chicago Blackhawks	Free agency	
September 10, 2001	Reid Simpson	Montreal Canadiens	Free agency (III)	
September 28, 2001	Sebastien Bordeleau	Minnesota Wild	Waiver draft	
October 2, 2001	Michel Riesen	HC Davos (NLA)	Free agency (Note: St. Louis retained Riesen’s NHL rights through the 2006–07 season.)	
October 12, 2001	Dan Trebil	Hammarby IF (Allsvenskan)	Free agency (UFA)	
March 19, 2002	Ted Donato	Los Angeles Kings	Waivers	

=== Signings ===
Date	Player	Term	Contract type	Ref
June 29, 2001	Alexander Khavanov	1-year	Option exercised	
June 29, 2001	Jamal Mayers	1-year	Option exercised	
June 30, 2001	Scott Mellanby	2-year	Re-signing	
July 1, 2001	Doug Weight	multi-year	Re-signing	
July 12, 2001	Keith Tkachuk	1-year	Re-signing	
July 18, 2001	Darren Rumble		Re-signing	
July 18, 2001	Cory Stillman	1-year	Re-signing	
August 18, 2001	Pavol Demitra	2-year	Arbitration award	
August 29, 2001	Eric Boguniecki	multi-year	Re-signing	
October 15, 2001	Al MacInnis	2-year	Extension	

== Draft picks ==
St. Louis's draft picks at the 2001 NHL entry draft held at the National Car Rental Center in Sunrise, Florida.

Round	#	Player	Nationality	College/Junior/Club team (League)
2	57	Jay McClement	Canada	Brampton Battalion (OHL)
3	89	Tuomas Nissinen	Finland	KalPa (Finland)
4	122	Igor Valeev	Russia	North Bay Centennials (OHL)
5	159	Dmitri Semin	Russia	Spartak Moscow (Russia)
6	190	Brett Scheffelmaier	Canada	Medicine Hat Tigers (WHL)
8	253	Petr Cajanek	Czech Republic	RI OKNA Zlín (Czech Republic)
9	270	Grant Jacobsen	Canada	Regina Pats (WHL)
9	283	Simon Skoog	Sweden	Mörrums GoIS IK Jr. (Sweden)

== See also ==
- 2001–02 NHL season
