= Tony Virta =

Finnish ice hockey player

- Born: June 28, 1972 (age 53) Hämeenlinna, Finland
- Height: 5 ft 10 in (178 cm)
- Weight: 178 lb (81 kg; 12 st 10 lb)
- Position: Right wing
- Shot: Left
- Played for: SM-l; HPK; TPS; Jokerit; DEL; Frankfurt Lions; NHL; Minnesota Wild; SEL; Södertälje SK; NLA; ZSC Lions
- National team: Finland
- NHL draft: 103rd overall, 2001; Minnesota Wild
- Playing career: 1991–2015

Tony Virta (born June 18, 1972) is a Finnish former professional ice hockey forward. He was drafted by the Minnesota Wild as their fourth-round pick in the 2001 NHL entry draft.

On December 5, 2005, Virta received a serious knee injury from a failed hip check against him in a game against Ilves, but recovered to play in the last games of the season.

In the summer of 2001 Virta signed with Färjestads BK, but before the season had started he signed with the NHL club Minnesota Wild, who had drafted the same summer, and therefore never played a game for Färjestad.

== Awards ==
- Lasse Oksanen trophy for best player during the SM-liiga regular season - 2001

== Career statistics ==
=== Regular season and playoffs ===
			Regular season					Playoffs
Season	Team	League	GP	G	A	Pts	PIM	GP	G	A	Pts	PIM
1988–89	HPK	FIN.2 U20	10	6	2	8	0	—	—	—	—	—
1989–90	HPK	FIN.2 U20	17	1	16	17	40	—	—	—	—	—
1990–91	HPK	FIN.2 U20	28	17	34	51	42	14	7	13	20	20
1991–92	HPK	FIN U20	35	24	31	55	114	—	—	—	—	—
1991–92	HPK	SM-l	23	1	2	3	0	—	—	—	—	—
1992–93	HPK	SM-l	48	9	8	17	35	12	1	0	1	0
1993–94	HPK	SM-l	47	17	16	33	50	—	—	—	—	—
1994–95	HPK	SM-l	43	9	24	33	75	—	—	—	—	—
1995–96	HPK	SM-l	48	15	19	34	12	9	1	3	4	31
1996–97	Frankfurt Lions	DEL	48	13	13	26	40	8	1	2	3	56
1997–98	TPS	SM-l	48	17	15	32	26	3	0	0	0	0
1998–99	TPS	SM-l	54	16	27	43	32	10	6	6	12	8
1999–2000	TPS	SM-l	53	14	37	51	57	11	2	7	9	6
2000–01	TPS	SM-l	56	27	32	59	24	10	2	5	7	6
2001–02	Houston Aeros	AHL	67	25	33	58	29	14	1	9	10	10
2001–02	Minnesota Wild	NHL	8	2	3	5	0	—	—	—	—	—
2002–03	Houston Aeros	AHL	39	6	12	18	14	—	—	—	—	—
2002–03	Södertälje SK	SEL	5	2	1	3	31	—	—	—	—	—
2003–04	HPK	SM-l	55	18	20	38	81	8	0	3	3	6
2004–05	GCK Lions	SUI.2	1	0	0	0	0	—	—	—	—	—
2004–05	ZSC Lions	NLA	40	10	14	24	12	14	7	6	13	14
2005–06	Jokerit	SM-l	36	7	12	19	48	—	—	—	—	—
2006–07	Jokerit	SM-l	26	5	10	15	18	10	0	10	10	4
2007–08	Jokerit	SM-l	56	10	23	33	67	14	1	6	7	10
2008–09	HPK	SM-l	50	8	15	23	65	6	1	2	3	6
2009–10	HPK	SM-l	34	4	14	18	28	—	—	—	—	—
2009–10	Leksands IF	Allsv	17	6	6	12	8	—	—	—	—	—
2011–12	PaKa	FIN.4	1	2	4	6	2	—	—	—	—	—
2014–15	HauSi	FIN.5	3	2	10	12	0	—	—	—	—	—
SM-l totals			677	177	274	451	618	93	14	42	56	77

=== International ===
Year	Team	Event	GP	G	A	Pts	PIM
1992	Finland	WJC	7	0	1	1	10
2000	Finland	WC	9	1	1	2	0
2001	Finland	WC	9	2	6	8	2
2003	Finland	WC	2	0	0	0	0
2004	Finland	WC	7	0	1	1	0
Junior totals			7	0	1	1	10
Senior totals			27	3	8	11	2

Preceded by Timo Pärssinen	Winner of the Lasse Oksanen trophy 2000–01	Succeeded by Janne Ojanen
