= Ryan Flinn (ice hockey) =

Canadian ice hockey player (born 1980)

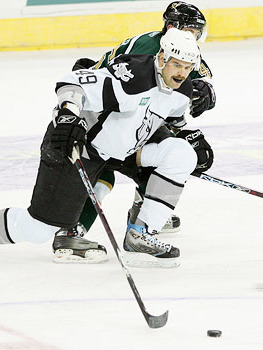
- Flinn with the San Antonio Rampage in 2007
- Born: April 20, 1980 (age 46) Halifax, Nova Scotia, Canada
- Height: 6 ft 5 in (196 cm)
- Weight: 248 lb (112 kg; 17 st 10 lb)
- Position: Left wing
- Shot: Left
- Played for: Los Angeles Kings
- NHL draft: 143rd overall, 1998; New Jersey Devils
- Playing career: 2001–2010

Ryan Flinn (born April 20, 1980) is a Canadian former professional ice hockey winger who played with the Los Angeles Kings in the National Hockey League (NHL).

== Playing career ==
Flinn was known as an enforcer. He was drafted in the fifth round, 143rd overall by the New Jersey Devils, in the 1998 NHL entry draft. Selected from the QMJHL Flinn accumulated over 200 penalty minutes in each of his four full seasons with the Titans, Halifax Mooseheads and the Cape Breton Screaming Eagles.

Unsigned by the Devils, Flinn began his professional career in the East Coast Hockey League with the Reading Royals. Leading the ECHL in penalty minutes, Flinn was signed to a try-out contract with the Manchester Monarchs of the AHL, before signing with NHL affiliate, the Los Angeles Kings midway through the 2001–02 season and appearing in 10 NHL games. Flinn spent 2002–03 split between the Monarchs and the Kings, scoring his first NHL goal with the Kings.

After missing the majority of the 2004–05 season with the Monarchs due to a foot and leg injury, Flinn returned the following year, only to be lost to a serious concussion suffered against the Chicago Blackhawks on November 26, 2005. After two consecutive injury-riddled seasons Flinn was released by the Kings. Unable to attract other NHL interest, he was signed by the AHL's San Antonio Rampage for the 2006–07 season.

The Edmonton Oilers signed Flinn to a one-year contract on July 17, 2007. He was then assigned to the Springfield Falcons, playing in 24 games before he was loaned to the Hershey Bears for the remainder of the year.

Flinn signed a one-year contract with the Montreal Canadiens on July 7, 2008. He was assigned to the Canadiens' AHL affiliate, the Hamilton Bulldogs, for the year. In the 2009–10 season, Flinn played two games for the Rockford Icehogs, tallying nine penalty minutes; he was then released but later signed a Professional Try-Out agreement with the IceHogs on November 17, 2009.

== Career statistics ==
			Regular season					Playoffs
Season	Team	League	GP	G	A	Pts	PIM	GP	G	A	Pts	PIM
1996–97	Laval Titan College Francais	QMJHL	23	3	2	5	66	2	0	0	0	0
1997–98	Laval Titan College Francais	QMJHL	59	4	12	16	217	15	1	0	1	63
1998–99	Acadie-Bathurst Titan	QMJHL	44	3	4	7	195	23	2	0	2	37
1999–00	Halifax Mooseheads	QMJHL	67	14	19	33	365	—	—	—	—	—
2000–01	Cape Breton Screaming Eagles	QMJHL	57	16	17	33	280	9	1	1	2	43
2001–02	Reading Royals	ECHL	20	1	3	4	120	—	—	—	—	—
2001–02	Manchester Monarchs	AHL	37	0	1	1	113	1	0	0	0	0
2001–02	Los Angeles Kings	NHL	10	0	0	0	51	—	—	—	—	—
2002–03	Manchester Monarchs	AHL	27	2	2	4	95	—	—	—	—	—
2002–03	Los Angeles Kings	NHL	19	1	0	1	28	—	—	—	—	—
2003–04	Manchester Monarchs	AHL	59	3	5	8	164	6	0	0	0	4
2004–05	Manchester Monarchs	AHL	14	1	1	2	112	—	—	—	—	—
2005–06	Manchester Monarchs	AHL	6	0	1	1	38	—	—	—	—	—
2005–06	Los Angeles Kings	NHL	2	0	0	0	5	—	—	—	—	—
2006–07	San Antonio Rampage	AHL	61	2	4	6	166	—	—	—	—	—
2007–08	Springfield Falcons	AHL	24	0	1	1	82	—	—	—	—	—
2007–08	Hershey Bears	AHL	17	3	0	3	53	2	0	0	0	2
2008–09	Hamilton Bulldogs	AHL	52	2	2	4	122	4	0	0	0	0
2009–10	Rockford IceHogs	AHL	20	2	2	4	74	—	—	—	—	—
AHL totals			311	16	19	35	1019	13	—	—	—	6
NHL totals			31	1	0	1	84	—	—	—	—	—
