= Robert Schnabel (ice hockey) =

Czech ice hockey player

- Born: November 10, 1978 (age 47) Prague, Czechoslovakia
- Height: 6 ft 5 in (196 cm)
- Weight: 238 lb (108 kg; 17 st 0 lb)
- Position: Defence
- Shot: Left
- Played for: HC Slavia Praha; Timrå IK; Nashville Predators; HC Sparta Praha; HIFK; Jokerit; HC Kladno; BK Mladá Boleslav; HK 36 Skalica; HC Slovan Bratislava; HC Plzeň; HC Fassa
- NHL draft: 79th overall, 1997; New York Islanders; 129th overall, 1998; Phoenix Coyotes
- Playing career: 1996–2014

Robert Schnabel (born November 10, 1978) is a Czech former professional ice hockey defenceman. He played 22 games in the National Hockey League with the Nashville Predators between 2002 and 2004. The rest of his career, which lasted from 1996 to 2014, was mainly spent in various European leagues.

== Playing career ==
Schnabel was drafted by the New York Islanders in round 3, #79 overall, of the 1997 NHL entry draft and again by the Phoenix Coyotes in round 5, #129 overall, in the 1998 NHL entry draft.

He was a product of HC Slavia Praha in the Czech league. After several seasons in North America, including 22 National Hockey League games for the Nashville Predators, Schnabel returned to Europe to represent first his hometown team in Prague and then HIFK in the Finnish SM-liiga. In January 2007, Schnabel's contract with HIFK was terminated upon the arrival of Billy Tibbetts, as the SM-liiga only allowed a team to dress four foreign-born players per game, and Tibbets was HIFK's fifth foreign player. Schnabel was subsequently signed by Jokerit of the same league. He played for BK Mladá Boleslav on loan from HC Kladno.

During his two seasons at the Manchester Phoenix, Schnabel won an EPIHL League Championship winners medal as well as both winners and runners-up medals in the Playoffs. In 2013–14, he was named to the EPIHL's First All Star Team by Ice Hockey Journalists.

His retirement from hockey was announced via the Manchester Phoenix on 7 April 2014, the day after Phoenix lost 5–3 in the EPIHL Playoff Final to Basingstoke Bison at the Skydome Arena in Coventry.

== Career statistics ==
=== Regular season and playoffs ===
			Regular season					Playoffs
Season	Team	League	GP	G	A	Pts	PIM	GP	G	A	Pts	PIM
1994–95	HC Slavia Praha U20	CZE U20	35	11	6	17	14	—	—	—	—	—
1995–96	HC Slavia Praha U20	CZE U20	38	3	5	8	—	—	—	—	—	—
1996–97	HC Slavia Praha U20	CZE U20	36	5	2	7	—	—	—	—	—	—
1996–97	HC Slavia Praha	CZE	4	0	0	0	4	1	0	0	0	0
1997–98	Red Deer Rebels	WHL	61	1	22	23	143	5	0	0	0	16
1998–99	Springfield Falcons	AHL	77	1	7	8	155	3	1	0	1	4
1998–99	Red Deer Rebels	WHL	1	0	0	0	2	—	—	—	—	—
1999–00	Springfield Falcons	AHL	40	2	8	10	133	5	0	0	0	14
2000–01	Springfield Falcons	AHL	22	1	2	3	38	—	—	—	—	—
2000–01	Timrå IK	SWE	16	0	2	2	72	—	—	—	—	—
2001–02	Nashville Predators	NHL	1	0	0	0	0	—	—	—	—	—
2001–02	Milwaukee Admirals	AHL	67	2	7	9	130	—	—	—	—	—
2002–03	Nashville Predators	NHL	1	0	0	0	0	—	—	—	—	—
2002–03	Milwaukee Admirals	AHL	62	3	6	9	178	6	0	0	0	0
2003–04	Nashville Predators	NHL	20	0	3	3	34	—	—	—	—	—
2003–04	Milwaukee Admirals	AHL	11	1	0	1	27	—	—	—	—	—
2004–05	HC Sparta Praha	CZE	47	1	4	5	85	4	0	0	0	12
2005–06	HIFK	FIN	51	3	11	14	165	11	0	0	0	63
2006–07	HIFK	FIN	32	1	3	4	120	—	—	—	—	—
2006–07	Jokerit	FIN	12	0	2	2	16	9	0	0	0	20
2007–08	HC Kladno	CZE	34	0	1	1	133	—	—	—	—	—
2007–08	BK Mladá Boleslav	CZE-2	3	0	0	0	2	15	1	3	4	74
2008–09	BK Mladá Boleslav	CZE	45	1	4	5	75	—	—	—	—	—
2008–09	HC Benátky nad Jizerou	CZE-2	3	0	1	1	6	—	—	—	—	—
2009–10	HK 36 Skalica	SVK	41	0	4	4	77	6	1	1	2	2
2010–11	HC Slovan Bratislava	SVK	26	1	4	5	43	—	—	—	—	—
2010–11	KLH Chomutov	CZE-2	5	0	0	0	8	10	0	0	0	8
2011–12	HC Plzeň 1929	CZE	9	0	1	1	31	—	—	—	—	—
2011–12	HC Fassa	ITA	26	5	10	15	83	4	0	1	1	10
2012–13	Manchester Phoenix	EPIHL	45	8	18	26	126	4	2	2	4	8
2013–14	Manchester Phoenix	EPIHL	53	11	32	43	170	4	0	1	1	2
CZE totals			139	2	10	12	328	11	0	0	0	18
NHL totals			22	0	3	3	34	—	—	—	—	—

=== International ===
Year	Team	Event	GP	G	A	Pts	PIM
1998	Czech Republic	WJC	7	0	0	0	2
Junior totals			7	0	0	0	2
