= Chris Heid =

Canadian-German ice hockey player

- Born: March 14, 1983 (age 43) Langley, British Columbia, Canada
- Height: 6 ft 1 in (185 cm)
- Weight: 205 lb (93 kg; 14 st 9 lb)
- Position: Defence
- Shot: Left
- Played for: Houston Aeros; Cleveland Barons; Eisbären Berlin; Krefeld Pinguine; Augsburger Panther; ERC Ingolstadt
- NHL draft: 74th overall, 2001; Minnesota Wild
- Playing career: 2003–2014

Chris Heid (born March 14, 1983) is a dual Canadian-German professional ice hockey defenceman who played in the American Hockey League (AHL) and Deutsche Eishockey Liga (DEL).

== Playing career ==
Heid was drafted 74th overall in the 2001 NHL entry draft by the Minnesota Wild. On September 1, 2011, Heid left Augsburger Panther after two seasons, and joined rival ERC Ingolstadt on a two-year contract.

== Career statistics ==
			Regular season					Playoffs
Season	Team	League	GP	G	A	Pts	PIM	GP	G	A	Pts	PIM
1998–99	Spokane Chiefs	WHL	1	0	0	0	0	—	—	—	—	—
1999–00	Spokane Chiefs	WHL	44	1	7	8	25	6	0	0	0	4
2000–01	Spokane Chiefs	WHL	51	2	15	17	76	12	0	4	4	12
2001–02	Spokane Chiefs	WHL	69	7	28	35	56	11	1	4	5	8
2002–03	Spokane Chiefs	WHL	60	9	36	45	64	11	2	11	13	10
2003–04	Houston Aeros	AHL	58	3	10	13	35	—	—	—	—	—
2004–05	Houston Aeros	AHL	19	0	5	5	20	—	—	—	—	—
2004–05	Louisiana IceGators	ECHL	17	2	6	8	14	—	—	—	—	—
2004–05	Pensacola Ice Pilots	ECHL	—	—	—	—	—	4	0	1	1	2
2005–06	Houston Aeros	AHL	4	0	1	1	14	—	—	—	—	—
2005–06	Pensacola Ice Pilots	ECHL	50	4	16	20	69	—	—	—	—	—
2005–06	Cleveland Barons	AHL	4	0	2	2	8	—	—	—	—	—
2005–06	Fresno Falcons	ECHL	—	—	—	—	—	16	2	2	4	8
2006–07	Eisbären Berlin	DEL	18	1	0	1	10	—	—	—	—	—
2006–07	Eisbären Regensburg	GER.2	29	1	7	8	34	4	0	0	0	4
2007–08	Eisbären Regensburg	GER.2	46	2	12	14	30	—	—	—	—	—
2008–09	Krefeld Pinguine	DEL	50	1	5	6	34	7	1	1	2	0
2009–10	Augsburger Panther	DEL	50	1	11	12	49	14	0	0	0	4
2010–11	Augsburger Panther	DEL	39	0	3	3	6	—	—	—	—	—
2011–12	ERC Ingolstadt	DEL	30	0	3	3	22	9	0	0	0	20
2012–13	ERC Ingolstadt	DEL	38	1	0	1	39	6	0	1	1	2
2013–14	EC Bad Nauheim	GER.2	18	0	7	7	16	—	—	—	—	—
AHL totals			85	3	18	21	77	—	—	—	—	—
DEL totals			225	4	22	26	160	36	1	2	3	26
