= Pavel Skrbek =

Czech ice hockey player

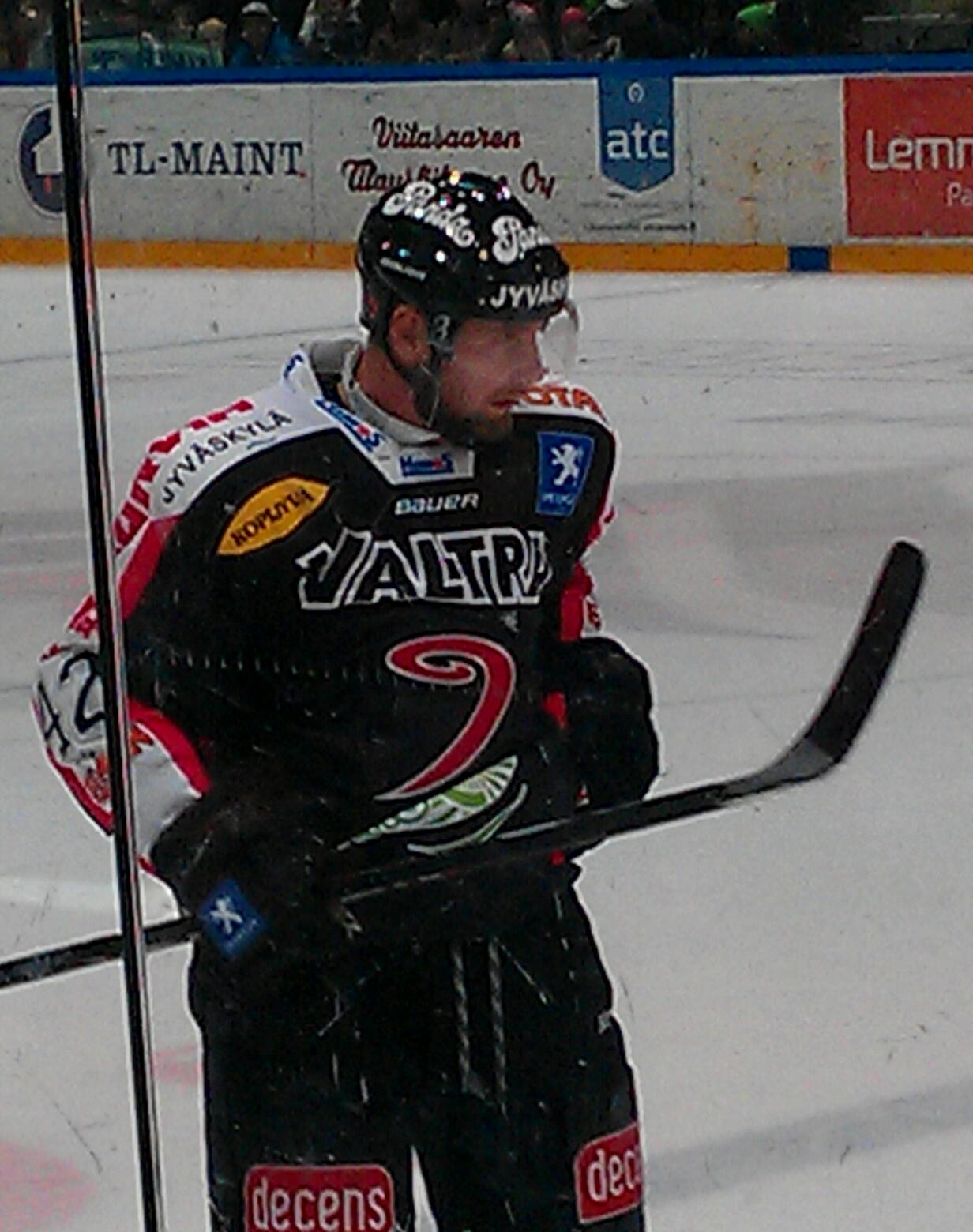
- Born: August 9, 1978 (age 47) Kladno, Czechoslovakia
- Height: 6 ft 3 in (191 cm)
- Weight: 231 lb (105 kg; 16 st 7 lb)
- Position: Defence
- Shot: Left
- Played for: Skellefteå AIK; Mora IK; Frölunda HC; JYP Jyväskylä; Luleå HF; HC Olomouc; Orli Znojmo
- NHL draft: 28th overall, 1996; Pittsburgh Penguins
- Playing career: 1995–2018

Pavel Skrbek (born August 9, 1978) is a Czech former ice hockey defenceman. He played briefly in the National Hockey League (NHL) with the Pittsburgh Penguins and Nashville Predators between 1998 and 2001, though most of his career, which lasted from 1995 to 2018, was spent in the Swedish Hockey League and Czech Extraliga.

== Playing career ==
Skrbek played one year in his native Czech Republic before being drafted by the Pittsburgh Penguins in the 2nd round, 28th overall in the 1996 NHL entry draft. After being drafted Skrbek returned to the Czech Republic and played 2 more years there.

For the 1998–1999 season Skrbek came to North America. He joined the Syracuse Crunch of the AHL and played 64 games with the team, scoring 22 points. That year he also made his NHL debut, appearing in 4 games with the Penguins. He spent the 1999–2000 season in the minors, playing the majority of the year with the Wilkes-Barre/Scranton Penguins before being traded to the Nashville Predators and playing briefly with the Milwaukee Admirals. Skrbek then spent the majority of the 2000–2001 season with the Admirals while also appearing in 5 games with the Predators.

For the 2001–2002 season Skrbek cracked the Predators starting lineup, but after 3 games he endured a concussion that sidelined him for the majority of the year. After recovering from the injury Skrbek chose to go back to the Czech Republic rather than the Predators. Since the 2002–2003 season Skrbek has played for a number of teams in the SEL.

== Career statistics ==
=== Regular season and playoffs ===
			Regular season					Playoffs
Season	Team	League	GP	G	A	Pts	PIM	GP	G	A	Pts	PIM
1994–95	Poldi SONP Kladno	CZE U20	29	7	6	13	—	—	—	—	—	—
1995–96	HC Poldi Kladno	CZE U20	29	10	12	22	—	—	—	—	—	—
1995–96	HC Poldi Kladno	CZE	14	0	0	0	4	5	0	0	0	4
1996–97	HC Poldi Kladno	CZE	36	1	5	6	26	3	0	0	0	4
1997–98	HC Velvana Kladno	CZE	47	4	10	14	124	—	—	—	—	—
1998–99	Pittsburgh Penguins	NHL	4	0	0	0	2	—	—	—	—	—
1998–99	Syracuse Crunch	AHL	64	6	16	22	38	—	—	—	—	—
1999–00	Wilkes-Barre/Scranton Penguins	AHL	51	7	16	23	50	—	—	—	—	—
1999–00	Milwaukee Admirals	IHL	6	0	0	0	0	—	—	—	—	—
2000–01	Nashville Predators	NHL	5	0	0	0	4	—	—	—	—	—
2000–01	Milwaukee Admirals	IHL	54	2	22	24	55	5	0	0	0	2
2001–02	HC Vagnerplast Kladno	CZE	24	2	3	5	30	—	—	—	—	—
2002–03	Luleå HF	SWE	39	2	2	4	61	4	0	0	0	10
2003–04	Luleå HF	SWE	34	4	4	8	84	5	0	4	4	6
2004–05	Mora IK	SWE	48	1	11	12	68	—	—	—	—	—
2005–06	Luleå HF	SWE	49	5	12	17	88	6	0	0	0	11
2006–07	Luleå HF	SWE	44	5	14	19	54	4	0	0	0	8
2008–09	HC GEUS OKNA Kladno	CZE	5	0	2	2	8	—	—	—	—	—
2008–09	Skellefteå AIK	SWE	50	4	11	15	64	10	1	0	1	8
2009–10	Skellefteå AIK	SWE	50	4	17	21	68	10	0	2	2	4
2010–11	Skellefteå AIK	SWE	13	0	1	1	8	—	—	—	—	—
2010–11	Frölunda HC	SWE	27	2	6	8	10	—	—	—	—	—
2011–12	Rytíři Kladno	CZE	8	1	2	3	4	—	—	—	—	—
2011–12	JYP	FIN	17	0	3	3	12	—	—	—	—	—
2012–13	Luleå HF	SWE	31	4	8	12	14	14	0	3	3	6
2013–14	Luleå HF	SWE	49	1	11	12	20	6	0	0	0	6
2014–15	HC Olomouc	CZE	39	5	16	21	32	—	—	—	—	—
2015–16	HC Olomouc	CZE	35	5	17	22	41	2	0	0	0	4
2016–17	HC Olomouc	CZE	1	0	0	0	0	—	—	—	—	—
2017–18	Orli Znojmo	EBEL	6	0	2	2	4	—	—	—	—	—
CZE totals			209	18	55	73	269	10	0	0	0	12
SWE totals			477	36	108	144	573	59	1	9	10	59
NHL totals			12	0	0	0	8	—	—	—	—	—

=== International ===
Year	Team	Event	GP	G	A	Pts	PIM
1996	Czech Republic	EJC	5	2	3	5	10
1998	Czech Republic	WJC	7	2	4	6	8
Junior totals			12	4	7	11	18

== Awards ==
- 1998: Named Best Defenseman at World Junior Championship
- 1998: World Junior Championship Second All-Star team
