= Petr Tenkrát =

Czech ice hockey player (born 1977)

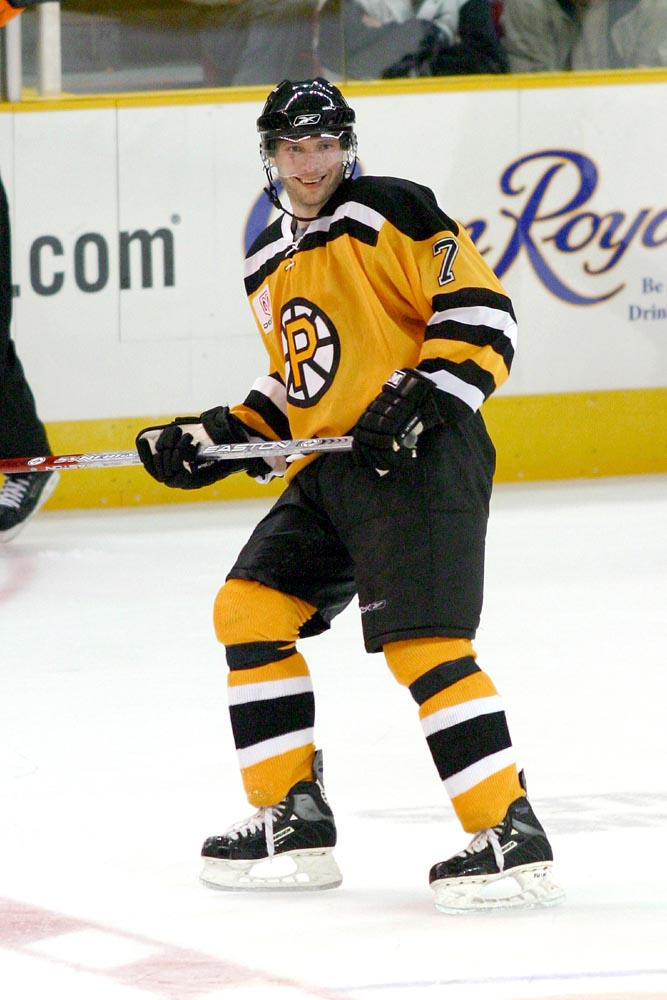
- Tenkrát with the Providence Bruins in 2006
- Born: May 31, 1977 (age 47); Děčín, Czechoslovakia
- Height: 5 ft 11 in (180 cm)
- Weight: 206 lb (93 kg; 14 st 10 lb)
- Position: Right wing
- Shot: Right
- CZE team Former teams: HC Sparta Praha; Skellefteå AIK (SEL); HC Kladno (CZE); HPK (SM-l); Ilves (SM-l); Cincinnati Mighty Ducks (AHL); Mighty Ducks of Anaheim (NHL); Nashville Predators (NHL); Milwaukee Admirals (AHL); Kärpät (SM-l); Khimik Voskresensk (RSL); Boston Bruins (NHL); Providence Bruins (AHL); Timrå IK (SEL)
- National team: Czech Republic
- NHL draft: 230th overall, 1999; Mighty Ducks of Anaheim
- Playing career: 1995–2017

Petr Tenkrát
Medal record

Representing Czech Republic

World Championships
Bronze medal – third place	2012 Helsinki	Ice hockey

Petr Tenkrát (born 31 May 1977) is a Czech former ice hockey forward who played in the National Hockey League for the Mighty Ducks of Anaheim, Nashville Predators and the Boston Bruins.

== Playing career ==
Tenkrát started his NHL career in the 2000–01 season, scoring four times with four assists for the Mighty Ducks of Anaheim in his first 10 NHL games.

He won SM-Liiga-silver in 2003 and bronze in 2006. SM-gold in 2004 and 2005.

Tenkrát's contract with Kärpät ended after the season 2005–06. He started the 2006–07 season with Boston Bruins's AHL affiliate, the Providence Bruins, after a trade with the Toronto Maple Leafs. He had signed a one-year deal with the club. On November 11, 2006 Tenkrát was called up from the Providence team to take the place of Boston forward Jeff Hoggan, and scored his first goal for the Bruins, wearing player number 17, in a home game against the Ottawa Senators that same night.

In both the 2007–08 and 2008–09 seasons Tenkrát returned to his hometown team before moving to Sweden's Elitserien to play with Timrå IK. He then signed a two-year contract with Skellefteå AIK in 2009, becoming a free agent in October 2010. He then returned to Czech Republic, signing with HC Sparta Praha for 2011-12 season. In April 2013 Tenkrát returned to Kladno.

He also was a member of the Czech national inline hockey team at the 2008 Men's World Inline Hockey Championships in Bratislava, Slovakia.

== Career statistics ==
			Regular season					Playoffs
Season	Team	League	GP	G	A	Pts	PIM	GP	G	A	Pts	PIM
1994–95	HC Kladno	Czech	1	0	0	0	0	—	—	—	—	—
1995–96	HC Kladno	Czech	21	0	4	4	6	—	—	—	—	—
1996–97	HC Kladno	Czech	43	5	9	14	2	3	0	1	1	0
1997–98	HC Kladno	Czech	52	9	10	19	24	—	—	—	—	—
1998–99	HC Kladno	Czech	49	21	14	35	32	—	—	—	—	—
1999–00	HPK	Liiga	32	20	8	28	51	—	—	—	—	—
1999–00	Ilves	Liiga	22	15	6	21	24	3	1	1	2	14
2000–01	Mighty Ducks of Anaheim	NHL	46	5	9	14	16	—	—	—	—	—
2000–01	Cincinnati Mighty Ducks	AHL	25	9	9	18	24	4	3	2	5	0
2001–02	Mighty Ducks of Anaheim	NHL	9	0	0	0	6	—	—	—	—	—
2001–02	Cincinnati Mighty Ducks	AHL	3	2	3	5	2	—	—	—	—	—
2001–02	Nashville Predators	NHL	58	8	16	24	28	—	—	—	—	—
2001–02	Milwaukee Admirals	AHL	4	0	0	0	2	—	—	—	—	—
2002–03	Kärpät	Liiga	51	21	19	40	60	14	4	2	6	6
2003–04	Kärpät	Liiga	35	22	15	37	30	15	3	7	10	45
2003–04	Khimik Voskresensk	Russia	19	0	2	2	18	—	—	—	—	—
2004–05	Kärpät	Liiga	53	18	20	38	46	12	7	4	11	6
2005–06	Kärpät	Liiga	36	10	21	31	22	11	6	3	9	18
2006–07	Boston Bruins	NHL	64	9	5	14	34	—	—	—	—	—
2006–07	Providence Bruins	AHL	7	2	7	9	6	—	—	—	—	—
2007–08	HC Kladno	Czech	13	4	5	9	18	—	—	—	—	—
2007–08	Timrå IK	SHL	42	10	12	22	72	11	4	3	7	10
2008–09	HC Kladno	Czech	14	4	3	7	41	—	—	—	—	—
2008–09	Timrå IK	SHL	44	14	9	23	34	7	2	1	3	4
2009–10	HC Kladno	Czech	4	5	3	8	6	—	—	—	—	—
2008–09	Skellefteå AIK	SHL	42	9	13	22	18	4	0	1	1	2
2010–11	Skellefteå AIK	SHL	9	0	0	0	2	—	—	—	—	—
2010–11	Kärpät	Liiga	45	17	16	33	86	3	1	3	4	2
2011–12	HC Sparta Praha	Czech	52	23	25	48	32	5	2	2	4	0
2012–13	HC Sparta Praha	Czech	51	18	13	31	26	7	4	1	5	22
2013–14	HC Kladno	Czech	50	13	7	20	30	—	—	—	—	—
2014–15	HC Kladno	Czech2	45	17	20	37	65	7	1	0	1	6
2015–16	HC Kometa Brno	Czech	4	0	0	0	4	—	—	—	—	—
2015–16	HC Slovan Ústí nad Labem	Czech2	35	12	14	26	18	15	2	6	8	14
2016–17	HC Kladno	Czech2	50	15	17	32	24	11	3	3	6	8
NHL totals			177	22	30	52	84	—	—	—	—	—
Czech totals			354	102	93	195	221	23	8	4	12	32
