= 2001–02 Toronto Maple Leafs season =

NHL hockey team season

2001–02 Toronto Maple Leafs
- Division: 2nd Northeast
- Conference: 4th Eastern
- 2001–02 record: 43–25–10–4
- Home record: 24–11–6–0
- Road record: 19–14–4–4
- Goals for: 249
- Goals against: 207

Team information
- General manager: Pat Quinn
- Coach: Pat Quinn
- Captain: Mats Sundin
- Alternate captains: Bryan McCabe; Gary Roberts; Dmitri Yushkevich
- Arena: Air Canada Centre
- Average attendance: 19,279
- Minor league affiliates: St. John's Maple Leafs; Columbia Inferno; Memphis RiverKings

Team leaders
- Goals: Mats Sundin (41)
- Assists: Mats Sundin (39)
- Points: Mats Sundin (80)
- Penalty minutes: Tie Domi (157)
- Plus/minus: Darcy Tucker (+24)
- Wins: Curtis Joseph (29)
- Goals against average: Curtis Joseph (2.23)

The 2001–02 Toronto Maple Leafs season was the team's 85th season as a franchise, and the 75th season as the Maple Leafs. They finished second in the Northeast Division with a record of 43–25–10–4 for 100 points. Qualifying for the Stanley Cup playoffs for the fourth year in a row as the fourth seed in the Eastern Conference, they defeated the New York Islanders in seven games in the Conference Quarterfinals and the Ottawa Senators in seven games in the Conference Semifinals. However, their luck ran out in the Conference Finals, as they were eliminated by the Carolina Hurricanes in six games. This marks the last time the Maple Leafs advanced to the Conference finals.

Leafs captain Mats Sundin ranked fourth in the NHL in scoring, with 80 points. Head Coach Pat Quinn and goaltender Curtis Joseph were members of the gold medal-winning Canadian ice hockey team at the 2002 Winter Olympics.

In 2010, the 2001–02 Toronto Maple Leafs were named the 22nd most hated team in sports history by Sports Illustrated.

== Off-season ==
Key dates prior to the start of the season:

- The 2001 NHL entry draft
- The free agency period began on July 1.

== Regular season ==
=== Season standings ===
Northeast Division
No.	CR		GP	W	L	T	OTL	GF	GA	Pts
1	1	**Boston Bruins**	82	43	24	6	9	236	201	101
2	4	**Toronto Maple Leafs**	82	43	25	10	4	249	207	100
3	7	**Ottawa Senators**	82	39	27	9	7	243	208	94
4	8	**Montreal Canadiens**	82	36	31	12	3	207	209	87
5	10	Buffalo Sabres	82	35	35	11	1	213	200	82

Note: CR = Conference rank; GP = Games played; W = Wins; L = Losses; T = Ties; OTL = Overtime loss; GF = Goals for; GA = Goals against; Pts = Points
Bolded teams qualified for the playoffs.

Eastern Conference
R		Div	GP	W	L	T	OTL	GF	GA	Pts
**1**	**Z-** Boston Bruins	**NE**	**82**	**43**	**24**	**6**	**9**	**236**	**201**	101
**2**	**Y-** Philadelphia Flyers	**AT**	**82**	**42**	**27**	**10**	**3**	**234**	**192**	97
**3**	**Y-** Carolina Hurricanes	**SE**	**82**	**35**	**26**	**16**	**5**	**217**	**217**	91
**4**	**X-** Toronto Maple Leafs	**NE**	**82**	**43**	**25**	**10**	**4**	**249**	**207**	100
**5**	**X-** New York Islanders	**AT**	**82**	**42**	**28**	**8**	**4**	**239**	**220**	96
**6**	**X-** New Jersey Devils	**AT**	**82**	**41**	**28**	**9**	**4**	**205**	**187**	95
**7**	**X-** Ottawa Senators	**NE**	**82**	**39**	**27**	**9**	**7**	**243**	**208**	94
**8**	**X-** Montreal Canadiens	**NE**	**82**	**36**	**31**	**12**	**3**	**207**	**209**	87
8.5
9	Washington Capitals	SE	82	36	33	11	2	228	240	85
10	Buffalo Sabres	NE	82	35	35	11	1	213	200	82
11	New York Rangers	AT	82	36	38	4	4	227	258	80
12	Pittsburgh Penguins	AT	82	28	41	8	5	198	249	69
13	Tampa Bay Lightning	SE	82	27	40	11	4	178	219	69
14	Florida Panthers	SE	82	22	44	10	6	180	250	60
15	Atlanta Thrashers	SE	82	19	47	11	5	187	288	54

Divisions: AT – Atlantic, NE – Northeast, SE – Southeast

Z – Clinched conference; Y – Clinched division; X – Clinched playoff spot

== Playoffs ==
The Maple Leafs qualified for the Stanley Cup playoffs for the fourth consecutive year. After defeating the New York Islanders in the first round and Ottawa Senators in the second round, both in seven games, they were eliminated by the Carolina Hurricanes in the Conference Finals in six games.

== Schedule and results ==
=== Regular season ===
2001–02 regular season
October: 7–3–1–1 (home: 4–2–0–0; road: 3–1–1–1)

Game	Date	Score	Opponent	Record	Recap
1	October 3, 2001	4–5	Ottawa Senators (2001–02)	0–1–0–0	L
2	October 6, 2001	2–2	@ Montreal Canadiens (2001–02)	0–1–1–0	T
3	October 8, 2001	6–1	Mighty Ducks of Anaheim (2001–02)	1–1–1–0	W
4	October 11, 2001	3–2	@ Carolina Hurricanes (2001–02)	2–1–1–0	W
5	October 13, 2001	2–5	St. Louis Blues (2001–02)	2–2–1–0	L
6	October 16, 2001	4–1	@ Edmonton Oilers (2001–02)	3–2–1–0	W
7	October 18, 2001	6–5	@ Vancouver Canucks (2001–02)	4–2–1–0	W
8	October 20, 2001	1–4	@ Calgary Flames (2001–02)	4–3–1–0	L
9	October 23, 2001	2–0	Boston Bruins (2001–02)	5–3–1–0	W
10	October 25, 2001	1–2 OT	@ Boston Bruins (2001–02)	5–3–1–1	OTL
11	October 27, 2001	4–0	Pittsburgh Penguins (2001–02)	6–3–1–1	W
12	October 30, 2001	3–2	Tampa Bay Lightning (2001–02)	7–3–1–1	W

November: 7–4–1–2 (home: 4–1–1–0; road: 3–3–0–2)

Game	Date	Score	Opponent	Record	Recap
13	November 1, 2001	1–3	@ Pittsburgh Penguins (2001–02)	7–4–1–1	L
14	November 3, 2001	4–1	Colorado Avalanche (2001–02)	8–4–1–1	W
15	November 6, 2001	4–2	Washington Capitals (2001–02)	9–4–1–1	W
16	November 9, 2001	2–3 OT	@ New Jersey Devils (2001–02)	9–4–1–2	OTL
17	November 10, 2001 †	1–1 OT	New Jersey Devils (2001–02)	9–4–2–2	T
18	November 14, 2001	3–2	@ Florida Panthers (2001–02)	10–4–2–2	W
19	November 15, 2001	3–2	@ Tampa Bay Lightning (2001–02)	11–4–2–2	W
20	November 17, 2001	1–2 OT	@ Ottawa Senators (2001–02)	11–4–2–3	OTL
21	November 19, 2001	5–1	Florida Panthers (2001–02)	12–4–2–3	W
22	November 21, 2001	2–4	@ Buffalo Sabres (2001–02)	12–5–2–3	L
23	November 23, 2001	1–3	@ New York Islanders (2001–02)	12–6–2–3	L
24	November 24, 2001	2–0	Boston Bruins (2001–02)	13–6–2–3	W
25	November 27, 2001	2–5	Carolina Hurricanes (2001–02)	13–7–2–3	L
26	November 30, 2001	2–1	@ Chicago Blackhawks (2001–02)	14–7–2–3	W

December: 8–5–1–0 (home: 5–2–0–0; road: 3–3–1–0)

Game	Date	Score	Opponent	Record	Recap
27	December 1, 2001	4–1	Chicago Blackhawks (2001–02)	15–7–2–3	W
28	December 4, 2001	0–1	Pittsburgh Penguins (2001–02)	15–8–2–3	L
29	December 6, 2001	6–3	@ New York Rangers (2001–02)	16–8–2–3	W
30	December 8, 2001	4–3	New York Rangers (2001–02)	17–8–2–3	W
31	December 11, 2001	6–3	Phoenix Coyotes (2001–02)	18–8–2–3	W
32	December 13, 2001	4–3 OT	@ St. Louis Blues (2001–02)	19–8–2–3	W
33	December 15, 2001	6–4	Montreal Canadiens (2001–02)	20–8–2–3	W
34	December 18, 2001	1–3	Los Angeles Kings (2001–02)	20–9–2–3	L
35	December 21, 2001	3–3 OT	@ Buffalo Sabres (2001–02)	20–9–3–3	T
36	December 22, 2001	3–2	Buffalo Sabres (2001–02)	21–9–3–3	W
37	December 26, 2001	3–4	@ Carolina Hurricanes (2001–02)	21–10–3–3	L
38	December 28, 2001	4–5	@ Atlanta Thrashers (2001–02)	21–11–3–3	L
39	December 29, 2001	2–4	@ Florida Panthers (2001–02)	21–12–3–3	L
40	December 31, 2001	4–1	@ Tampa Bay Lightning (2001–02)	22–12–3–3	W

January: 6–5–2–1 (home: 3–2–1–0; road: 3–3–1–0)

Game	Date	Score	Opponent	Record	Recap
41	January 3, 2002	2–1	@ Boston Bruins (2001–02)	23–12–3–3	W
42	January 5, 2002	3–1	Ottawa Senators (2001–02)	24–12–3–3	W
43	January 7, 2002	3–4	@ Ottawa Senators (2001–02)	24–13–3–3	L
44	January 8, 2002	4–3	Nashville Predators (2001–02)	25–13–3–3	W
45	January 11, 2002	3–3 OT	@ Washington Capitals (2001–02)	25–13–4–3	T
46	January 12, 2002	1–1 OT	Montreal Canadiens (2001–02)	25–13–5–3	T
47	January 15, 2002	2–3	Atlanta Thrashers (2001–02)	25–14–5–3	L
48	January 17, 2002	2–3 OT	@ Nashville Predators (2001–02)	25–14–5–4	OTL
49	January 19, 2002	0–3	Philadelphia Flyers (2001–02)	25–15–5–4	L
50	January 22, 2002	6–1	@ Calgary Flames (2001–02)	26–15–5–4	W
51	January 25, 2002	1–6	@ Vancouver Canucks (2001–02)	26–16–5–4	L
52	January 26, 2002	1–4	@ Edmonton Oilers (2001–02)	26–17–5–4	L
53	January 29, 2002	4–3	San Jose Sharks (2001–02)	27–17–5–4	W
54	January 30, 2002	6–0	@ Atlanta Thrashers (2001–02)	28–17–5–4	W

February: 4–1–0–0 (home: 4–0–0–0; road: 0–1–0–0)

Game	Date	Score	Opponent	Record	Recap
55	February 5, 2002	3–1	Minnesota Wild (2001–02)	29–17–5–4	W
56	February 7, 2002	1–4	@ New York Islanders (2001–02)	29–18–5–4	L
57	February 9, 2002	4–1	Montreal Canadiens (2001–02)	30–18–5–4	W
58	February 11, 2002	5–4	Atlanta Thrashers (2001–02)	31–18–5–4	W
59	February 26, 2002	4–1	Carolina Hurricanes (2001–02)	32–18–5–4	W

March: 6–6–4–0 (home: 3–3–3–0; road: 3–3–1–0)

Game	Date	Score	Opponent	Record	Recap
60	March 1, 2002	2–4	@ New Jersey Devils (2001–02)	32–19–5–4	L
61	March 2, 2002	3–3 OT	Buffalo Sabres (2001–02)	32–19–6–4	T
62	March 4, 2002	3–2	@ Washington Capitals (2001–02)	33–19–6–4	W
63	March 6, 2002	2–6	@ Detroit Red Wings (2001–02)	33–20–6–4	L
64	March 9, 2002	1–1 OT	@ Montreal Canadiens (2001–02)	33–20–7–4	T
65	March 10, 2002	3–1	@ Philadelphia Flyers (2001–02)	34–20–7–4	W
66	March 12, 2002	1–1 OT	Philadelphia Flyers (2001–02)	34–20–8–4	T
67	March 14, 2002	2–1	@ Boston Bruins (2001–02)	35–20–8–4	W
68	March 16, 2002	5–5 OT	Dallas Stars (2001–02)	35–20–9–4	T
69	March 19, 2002	3–2 OT	New York Islanders (2001–02)	36–20–9–4	W
70	March 21, 2002	3–4	Washington Capitals (2001–02)	36–21–9–4	L
71	March 23, 2002	2–0	Buffalo Sabres (2001–02)	37–21–9–4	W
72	March 25, 2002	1–4	@ Philadelphia Flyers (2001–02)	37–22–9–4	L
73	March 26, 2002	7–2	Tampa Bay Lightning (2001–02)	38–22–9–4	W
74	March 28, 2002	4–5	New York Islanders (2001–02)	38–23–9–4	L
75	March 30, 2002	1–3	New Jersey Devils (2001–02)	38–24–9–4	L

April: 5–1–1–0 (home: 1–1–1–0; road: 4–0–0–0)

Game	Date	Score	Opponent	Record	Recap
76	April 1, 2002	5–4 OT	@ Detroit Red Wings (2001–02)	39–24–9–4	W
77	April 4, 2002	2–4	New York Rangers (2001–02)	39–25–9–4	L
78	April 6, 2002	2–2 OT	Florida Panthers (2001–02)	39–25–10–4	T
79	April 8, 2002	4–1	Columbus Blue Jackets (2001–02)	40–25–10–4	W
80	April 10, 2002	7–2	@ New York Rangers (2001–02)	41–25–10–4	W
81	April 12, 2002	5–2	@ Pittsburgh Penguins (2001–02)	42–25–10–4	W
82	April 13, 2002	5–2	@ Ottawa Senators (2001–02)	43–25–10–4	W

Legend: W Win (2 points) L Loss (0 points) T Tie (1 point) OTL Overtime loss (1 point)

- † Hockey Hall of Fame Game

=== Playoffs ===
2002 Stanley Cup playoffs
Eastern Conference Quarterfinals vs. New York Islanders - Maple Leafs win 4–3

Game	Date	Score	Opponent	Attendance	Series	Recap
1	April 18, 2002	3–1	New York Islanders	19,438	Maple Leafs lead 1–0	W
2	April 20, 2002	2–0	New York Islanders	19,434	Maple Leafs lead 2–0	W
3	April 23, 2002	1–6	@ New York Islanders	16,234	Maple Leafs lead 2–1	L
4	April 24, 2002	3–4	@ New York Islanders	16,234	Series tied 2–2	L
5	April 26, 2002	6–3	New York Islanders	19,458	Maple Leafs lead 3–2	W
6	April 28, 2002	3–5	@ New York Islanders	16,234	Series tied 3–3	L
7	April 30, 2002	4–2	New York Islanders	19,519	Maple Leafs win 4–3	W

Eastern Conference Semifinals vs. Ottawa Senators - Maple Leafs win 4–3

Game	Date	Score	Opponent	Attendance	Series	Recap
1	May 2, 2002	0–5	Ottawa Senators	19,406	Senators lead 1–0	L
2	May 4, 2002	3–2 3OT	Ottawa Senators	19,454	Series tied 1–1	W
3	May 6, 2002	2–3	@ Ottawa Senators	18,500	Senators lead 2–1	L
4	May 8, 2002	2–1	@ Ottawa Senators	18,500	Series tied 2–2	W
5	May 10, 2002	2–4	Ottawa Senators	19,499	Senators lead 3–2	L
6	May 12, 2002	4–3	@ Ottawa Senators	18,500	Series tied 3–3	W
7	May 14, 2002	3–0	Ottawa Senators	19,551	Maple Leafs win 4–3	W

Eastern Conference Finals vs. Carolina Hurricanes - Hurricanes win 4–2

Game	Date	Score	Opponent	Attendance	Series	Recap
1	May 16, 2002	2–1	@ Carolina Hurricanes	18,730	Maple Leafs lead 1–0	W
2	May 19, 2002	1–2 OT	@ Carolina Hurricanes	18,924	Series tied 1–1	L
3	May 21, 2002	1–2 OT	Carolina Hurricanes	19,293	Hurricanes lead 2–1	L
4	May 23, 2002	0–3	Carolina Hurricanes	19,299	Hurricanes lead 3–1	L
5	May 25, 2002	1–0	@ Carolina Hurricanes	19,016	Hurricanes lead 3-2	W
6	May 28, 2002	1–2 OT	Carolina Hurricanes	19,327	Hurricanes win 4–2	L

Legend: W Win L Loss

== Player statistics ==
=== Scoring ===
- Position abbreviations: C = Centre; D = Defence; G = Goaltender; LW = Left wing; RW = Right wing
- † = Joined team via a transaction (e.g., trade, waivers, signing) during the season. Stats reflect time with the Maple Leafs only.
- ‡ = Left team via a transaction (e.g., trade, waivers, release) during the season. Stats reflect time with the Maple Leafs only.

No.	Player	Pos	Regular season						Playoffs					
No.	Player	Pos	GP	G	A	Pts	+/-	PIM	GP	G	A	Pts	+/-	PIM
13	Mats Sundin	C	82	41	39	80	6	94	8	2	5	7	5	4
16	Darcy Tucker	LW	77	24	35	59	24	92	17	4	4	8	−1	38
89	Alexander Mogilny	RW	66	24	33	57	1	8	20	8	3	11	1	8
19	Mikael Renberg	RW	71	14	38	52	11	36	3	0	0	0	1	2
21	Robert Reichel	C	78	20	31	51	7	26	18	0	3	3	−6	4
7	Gary Roberts	LW	69	21	27	48	−4	63	19	7	12	19	6	56
14	Jonas Hoglund	LW	82	13	34	47	11	26	20	4	6	10	−3	2
24	Bryan McCabe	D	82	17	26	43	16	129	20	5	5	10	4	30
15	Tomas Kaberle	D	69	10	29	39	5	2	20	2	8	10	7	16
39	Travis Green	RW	82	11	23	34	13	61	20	3	6	9	5	34
27	Shayne Corson	C	74	12	21	33	11	120	19	1	6	7	−2	33
28	Tie Domi	RW	74	9	10	19	3	157	19	1	3	4	0	61
36	Dmitry Yushkevich	D	55	6	13	19	14	26	—	—	—	—	—	—
18	Alyn McCauley	C	82	6	10	16	10	18	20	5	10	15	3	4
10	Garry Valk	LW	63	5	10	15	2	28	11	1	0	1	−1	4
25	Jyrki Lumme†	D	51	4	8	12	13	18	14	0	0	0	−2	4
4	Cory Cross	D	50	3	9	12	11	54	12	0	0	0	−1	8
8	Aki Berg	D	81	1	10	11	14	46	20	0	1	1	0	37
26	Paul Healey	RW	21	3	7	10	7	2	18	0	1	1	2	2
2	Wade Belak	D	63	1	3	4	2	142	16	1	0	1	4	18
29	Karel Pilar	D	23	1	3	4	3	8	11	0	4	4	−3	12
22	Alexei Ponikarovsky	LW	8	2	0	2	2	0	10	0	0	0	0	4
11	Nik Antropov	RW	11	1	1	2	−1	4	—	—	—	—	—	—
44	Anders Eriksson	D	34	0	2	2	−1	12	10	0	0	0	−3	0
20	Jeff Farkas	RW	6	0	2	2	1	4	2	0	0	0	0	0
31	Curtis Joseph	G	51	0	1	1		10	20	0	0	0		4
3	Dave Manson‡	D	13	0	1	1	3	10	—	—	—	—	—	—
30	Tom Barrasso†	G	4	0	0	0		0	—	—	—	—	—	—
30	Sebastien Centomo	G	1	0	0	0		0	—	—	—	—	—	—
43	Nathan Dempsey	D	3	0	0	0	1	0	6	0	2	2	1	0
3	Marc Moro†	D	2	0	0	0	0	2	—	—	—	—	—	—
35	Corey Schwab	G	30	0	0	0		2	1	0	0	0		0
33	Bob Wren	C	1	0	0	0	1	0	1	0	0	0	0	0
37	Don MacLean	C	—	—	—	—	—	—	3	0	0	0	0	0

=== Goaltending ===
- † = Joined team via a transaction (e.g., trade, waivers, signing) during the season. Stats reflect time with the Maple Leafs only.

No.	Player	Regular season										Playoffs								
No.	Player	GP	W	L	T	SA	GA	GAA	SV%	SO	TOI	GP	W	L	SA	GA	GAA	SV%	SO	TOI
31	Curtis Joseph	51	29	17	5	1210	114	2.23	.906	4	3065	20	10	10	557	48	2.30	.914	3	1253
35	Corey Schwab	30	12	10	5	707	75	2.73	.894	1	1646	1	0	0	5	0	0.00	1.000	0	12
30	Tom Barrasso†	4	2	2	0	110	10	2.74	.909	0	219	—	—	—	—	—	—	—	—	—
30	Sebastien Centomo	1	0	0	0	12	3	4.50	.750	0	40	—	—	—	—	—	—	—	—	—

== Awards and records ==
=== Awards ===
Type	Award/honour	Recipient	Ref
League (annual)	NHL Second All-Star Team	Mats Sundin (Centre)	
League (in-season)	NHL All-Star Game selection	Tomas Kaberle	
League (in-season)	NHL All-Star Game selection	Pat Quinn (coach)	
League (in-season)	NHL All-Star Game selection	Mats Sundin	
League (in-season)	NHL Player of the Week	Darcy Tucker (April 15)	
Team	Molson Cup	Mats Sundin	

=== Milestones ===
Milestone	Player	Date	Ref
400th goal scored	Alexander Mogilny	October 8, 2001	
500th coaching win	Pat Quinn	December 6, 2001	
First game	Karel Pilar	January 25, 2002	
First game	Sebastien Centomo	March 6, 2002	

== Transactions ==
The Maple Leafs were involved in the following transactions from June 10, 2001, the day after the deciding game of the 2001 Stanley Cup Final, through June 13, 2002, the day of the deciding game of the 2002 Stanley Cup Final.

=== Trades ===
Date	Details		Ref
June 12, 2001	To Phoenix Coyotes: Danny Markov	To Toronto Maple Leafs: Travis Green; Craig Mills; Robert Reichel	
June 22, 2001	To Phoenix Coyotes: Sergei Berezin	To Toronto Maple Leafs: Mikael Renberg	
June 23, 2001	To Chicago Blackhawks: Igor Korolev	To Toronto Maple Leafs: 3rd-round pick in 2001	
September 30, 2001	To Chicago Blackhawks: Shawn Thornton	To Toronto Maple Leafs: Marty Wilford	
November 21, 2001	To Dallas Stars: Dave Manson	To Toronto Maple Leafs: Jyrki Lumme	
March 1, 2002	To Nashville Predators: D. J. Smith; Marty Wilford	To Toronto Maple Leafs: Marc Moro	
March 15, 2002	To Carolina Hurricanes: 4th-round pick in 2003	To Toronto Maple Leafs: Tom Barrasso	
May 13, 2002	To Boston Bruins: Rights to Kris Vernarsky	To Toronto Maple Leafs: Ric Jackman	

=== Players acquired ===
Date	Player	Former team	Term	Via	Ref
July 3, 2001	Alexander Mogilny	New Jersey Devils	4-year	Free agency	
July 4, 2001	Anders Eriksson	Florida Panthers	3-year	Free agency	
July 16, 2001	Francois Bouchard	Djurgardens IF (SHL)		Free agency	
July 24, 2001	Doug Doull	Saint John Flames (AHL)		Free agency	
July 24, 2001	Paul Healey	Edmonton Oilers		Free agency	
July 24, 2001	Bob Wren	Anaheim Mighty Ducks		Free agency	
August 7, 2001	Chris Murray	St. Louis Blues	1-year	Free agency	
October 1, 2001	Corey Schwab	Vancouver Canucks		Free agency	

=== Players lost ===
Date	Player	New team	Via (Note: In parentheses is the player's free agency group on July 1 if applicable.)	Ref
July 1, 2001	Jimmy Waite	Essen Mosquitoes (DEL)	Free agency (III)	
July 4, 2001	Glenn Healy (Note: Healy retired.)		Buyout	
July 4, 2001	Yanic Perreault	Montreal Canadiens	Free agency (V)	
July 18, 2001	Steve Thomas	Chicago Blackhawks	Free agency (III)	
August 2, 2001	Mikael Hakanson	Djurgardens IF (SHL)	Free agency (II) (Note: Toronto retained Hakanson’s NHL rights through the 2005–06 season.)	
August 23, 2001	David Cooper	Eisbaren Berlin (DEL)	Free agency (VI)	
September 29, 2001	Tomas Kaberle	HC Kladno (ELH)	Free agency (II) (Note: Toronto retained Kaberle’s NHL rights and re-signed him on October 30.)	
October 4, 2001	Bryan Berard	New York Rangers	Free agency (UFA)	
October 9, 2001	Jason Sessa	South Carolina Stingrays (ECHL)	Free agency (UFA)	
October 24, 2001	Chris Murray		Retirement	
June 8, 2002	Maxim Galanov	Augsburger Panther (DEL)	Free agency (Note: Toronto retained Galanov's NHL rights through the 2005–06 season.)	

=== Signings ===
Date	Player	Term	Contract type	Ref
June 12, 2001	Travis Green	multi-year	Re-signing	
June 12, 2001	Robert Reichel	multi-year	Re-signing	
June 22, 2001	Mikael Renberg	multi-year	Re-signing	
July 3, 2001	Mikael Tellqvist	3-year	Entry-level	
July 11, 2001	Karel Pilar		Entry-level	
July 14, 2001	Bryan McCabe	multi-year	Re-signing	
July 18, 2001	Mats Sundin	6-year	Re-signing	
August 1, 2001	Wade Belak		Re-signing	
August 1, 2001	Aki Berg		Re-signing	
August 1, 2001	Cory Cross		Re-signing	
August 1, 2001	Jeff Farkas		Re-signing	
August 1, 2001	Maxim Galanov		Re-signing	
August 1, 2001	Donald MacLean		Re-signing	
August 1, 2001	Craig Mills		Re-signing	
August 1, 2001	Dmytro Yakushyn		Re-signing	
August 13, 2001	Alyn McCauley	1-year	Re-signing	
October 30, 2001	Tomas Kaberle	multi-year	Re-signing	
March 25, 2002	Jay Harrison	multi-year	Entry-level	
April 2, 2002	Brad Boyes	3-year	Entry-level	
May 31, 2002	Jean-Francois Racine	multi-year	Entry-level	

== Draft picks ==
Toronto's picks at the 2001 NHL entry draft in Sunrise, Florida.

Round	Pick	Player	Position	Nationality	College/Junior/Club team (League)
1	17	Carlo Colaiacovo	Defence	Canada	Erie Otters (OHL)
2	39	Karel Pilar	Defence	Czech Republic	HC Litvínov (Czech Republic)
3	65	Brendan Bell	Defence	Canada	Ottawa 67's (OHL)
3	82	Jay Harrison	Defence	Canada	Brampton Battalion (OHL)
3	88	Nicolas Corbeil	Centre	Canada	Sherbrooke Castors (QMJHL)
5	134	Kyle Wellwood	Centre	Canada	Belleville Bulls (OHL)
6	168	Maxim Kondratyev	Defence	Russia	Lada Togliatti (Russia)
6	183	Jaroslav Sklenar	Left wing	Czech Republic	HC Brno (Czech Republic)
7	198	Ivan Kolozvary	Centre	Slovakia	Dukla Trenčín (Slovakia)
7	213	Jan Chovan	Goaltender	Slovakia	Belleville Bulls (OHL)
8	246	Tomas Mojzis	Defence	Czech Republic	Moose Jaw Warriors (WHL)
9	276	Mike Knoepfli	Left wing	Canada	Georgetown Raiders (OPJA)

== See also ==
- 2001–02 NHL season
