= 2001–02 Columbus Blue Jackets season =

National Hockey League season

2001–02 Columbus Blue Jackets
- Division: 5th Central
- Conference: 15th Western
- 2001–02 record: 22–47–8–5
- Home record: 14–18–5–4
- Road record: 8–29–3–1
- Goals for: 164
- Goals against: 255

Team information
- General manager: Doug MacLean
- Coach: Dave King
- Captain: Lyle Odelein (Oct-Mar); Vacant (Mar-Apr)
- Alternate captains: Geoff Sanderson; Tyler Wright
- Arena: Nationwide Arena
- Average attendance: 18,136
- Minor league affiliates: Syracuse Crunch (AHL); Dayton Bombers (ECHL); Elmira Jackals (UHL)

Team leaders
- Goals: Ray Whitney (21)
- Assists: Ray Whitney (40)
- Points: Ray Whitney (61)
- Penalty minutes: Jody Shelley (206)
- Plus/minus: Jody Shelley (+1)
- Wins: Ron Tugnutt (12)
- Goals against average: Ron Tugnutt (2.85)

The 2001–02 Columbus Blue Jackets season was the Blue Jackets' second season in the National Hockey League (NHL), as the team was coming off a 28–39–9–6 record in their expansion season, earning 71 points and missing the 2001 Stanley Cup playoffs. The Blue Jackets did not qualify for the 2002 playoffs for the second year in a row for the first time in franshise history.

== Regular season ==
Columbus would get off to a poor start, winning only one out of 13 games to open the season and falling to last place in the Western Conference. While the Blue Jackets would play better as the season progressed, they were far off from playoff qualification and would eventually trade team captain Lyle Odelein to the Chicago Blackhawks in exchange for defenseman Jaroslav Spacek at the trade deadline. Columbus would finish the season with a 22–47–8–5 record, earning 57 points, which was 14 fewer points than in their previous season, and 37 points behind the Vancouver Canucks for the eighth final playoff spot in the West. Columbus would score an NHL-low 164 goals, and their 255 goals against was the highest total in the Western Conference, third-highest in the NHL. The 57 points the Jackets earned was the second fewest in the League, only ahead of the Atlanta Thrashers, who finished with 54.

Ray Whitney would lead Columbus offensively, scoring a team-high 21 goals and 40 assists for 61 points, which broke the team record for points in a season. Mike Sillinger would be the only other Blue Jacket to score 20 goals, scoring 20 and adding 23 assists for 43 points. Deron Quint led the Jackets defense, earning 25 points, while Rostislav Klesla scored eight goals and earned 16 points in his first full season in the League. Jody Shelley had a team-high and club-record 206 penalty minutes in only 52 games.

In goal, Ron Tugnutt and Marc Denis would split time, with Tugnutt winning a team-high 12 games and posting a team-best 2.85 goals against average (GAA).

Tragedy struck at Nationwide Arena during a game on March 16, 2002, against the Calgary Flames, when a shot by Jackets forward Espen Knutsen was deflected off the stick of Flames defenceman Derek Morris and sailed into the stands, hitting 13-year-old Brittanie Cecil in the head. Cecil would pass away on March 18 due to the injury.

The Blue Jackets would finish the season 30th in the League in scoring, with 164 goals for, and would be shut out an NHL-high 11 times.

=== Season standings ===
Central Division
No.	CR		GP	W	L	T	OTL	GF	GA	Pts
1	1	**Detroit Red Wings**	82	51	17	10	4	251	187	116
2	4	**St. Louis Blues**	82	43	27	8	4	227	188	98
3	5	**Chicago Blackhawks**	82	41	27	13	1	216	207	96
4	14	Nashville Predators	82	28	41	13	0	196	230	69
5	15	Columbus Blue Jackets	82	22	47	8	5	164	255	57

Note: CR = Conference rank; GP = Games played; W = Wins; L = Losses; T = Ties; OTL = Overtime loss; GF = Goals for; GA = Goals against; Pts = Points
Bolded teams qualified for the playoffs.

Western Conference
R		Div	GP	W	L	T	OTL	GF	GA	Pts
**1**	**p – Detroit Red Wings**	**CEN**	**82**	**51**	**17**	**10**	**4**	**251**	**187**	**116**
**2**	**y – Colorado Avalanche**	**NW**	**82**	**45**	**28**	**8**	**1**	**212**	**169**	**99**
**3**	**y – San Jose Sharks**	**PAC**	**82**	**44**	**27**	**8**	**3**	**248**	**199**	**99**
**4**	**St. Louis Blues**	**CEN**	**82**	**43**	**27**	**8**	**4**	**227**	**188**	**98**
**5**	**Chicago Blackhawks**	**CEN**	**82**	**41**	**27**	**13**	**1**	**216**	**207**	**96**
**6**	**Phoenix Coyotes**	**PAC**	**82**	**40**	**27**	**9**	**6**	**228**	**210**	**95**
**7**	**Los Angeles Kings**	**PAC**	**82**	**40**	**27**	**11**	**4**	**214**	**190**	**95**
**8**	**Vancouver Canucks**	**NW**	**82**	**42**	**30**	**7**	**3**	**254**	**211**	**94**
8.5
9	Edmonton Oilers	NW	82	38	28	12	4	205	182	92
10	Dallas Stars	PAC	82	36	28	13	5	215	213	90
11	Calgary Flames	NW	82	32	35	12	3	201	220	79
12	Minnesota Wild	NW	82	26	35	12	9	195	238	73
13	Mighty Ducks of Anaheim	PAC	82	29	42	8	3	175	198	69
14	Nashville Predators	CEN	82	28	41	13	0	196	230	69
15	Columbus Blue Jackets	CEN	82	22	47	8	5	164	255	57

Divisions: CEN – Central, PAC – Pacific, NW – Northwest

bold – Qualified for playoffs; p – Won Presidents' Trophy; y – Won division

== Schedule and results ==
2001–02 regular season
October: 1–7–4–0 (home: 0–4–2–0; road: 1–3–2–0)

Game	Date	Visitor	Score	Home	Record	Pts	Recap
1	October 4	St. Louis Blues	3–3	Columbus Blue Jackets	0–0–1–0	1	T
2	October 6	Columbus Blue Jackets	3–3	Philadelphia Flyers	0–0–2–0	2	T
3	October 8	Philadelphia Flyers	2–2	Columbus Blue Jackets	0–0–3–0	3	T
4	October 12	Montreal Canadiens	3–1	Columbus Blue Jackets	0–1–3–0	3	L
5	October 14	Columbus Blue Jackets	2–2	Chicago Blackhawks	0–1–4–0	4	T
6	October 16	Columbus Blue Jackets	3–4	Detroit Red Wings	0–2–4–0	4	L
7	October 19	Columbus Blue Jackets	3–1	Buffalo Sabres	1–2–4–0	6	W
8	October 20	Colorado Avalanche	5–0	Columbus Blue Jackets	1–3–4–0	6	L
9	October 23	Los Angeles Kings	7–1	Columbus Blue Jackets	1–4–4–0	6	L
10	October 25	Edmonton Oilers	5–2	Columbus Blue Jackets	1–5–4–0	6	L
11	October 27	Columbus Blue Jackets	0–2	San Jose Sharks	1–6–4–0	6	L
12	October 30	Columbus Blue Jackets	1–3	Vancouver Canucks	1–7–4–0	6	L

November: 6–6–1–1 (home: 4–3–1–1; road: 2–3–0–0)

Game	Date	Visitor	Score	Home	Record	Pts	Recap
13	November 1	Columbus Blue Jackets	1–2	Calgary Flames	1–8–4–0	6	L
14	November 2	Columbus Blue Jackets	2–1	Edmonton Oilers	2–8–4–0	8	W
15	November 6	Vancouver Canucks	3–2	Columbus Blue Jackets	2–9–4–0	8	L
16	November 9	Edmonton Oilers	3–0	Columbus Blue Jackets	2–10–4–0	8	L
17	November 10	Columbus Blue Jackets	5–1	Boston Bruins	3–10–4–0	10	W
18	November 13	St. Louis Blues	2–3	Columbus Blue Jackets	4–10–4–0	12	W
19	November 16	Mighty Ducks of Anaheim	2–3	Columbus Blue Jackets	5–10–4–0	14	W
20	November 17	Columbus Blue Jackets	2–3	Nashville Predators	5–11–4–0	14	L
21	November 19	Columbus Blue Jackets	2–5	Carolina Hurricanes	5–12–4–0	14	L
22	November 21	Detroit Red Wings	1–0	Columbus Blue Jackets	5–12–4–1	15	OTL
23	November 23	Chicago Blackhawks	2–2	Columbus Blue Jackets	5–12–5–1	16	T
24	November 25	Calgary Flames	3–4	Columbus Blue Jackets	6–12–5–1	18	W
25	November 27	Phoenix Coyotes	0–3	Columbus Blue Jackets	7–12–5–1	20	W
26	November 29	St. Louis Blues	3–1	Columbus Blue Jackets	7–13–5–1	20	L

December: 3–9–1–0 (home: 2–2–1–0; road: 1–7–0–0)

Game	Date	Visitor	Score	Home	Record	Pts	Recap
27	December 1	Columbus Blue Jackets	3–4	St. Louis Blues	7–14–5–1	20	L
28	December 5	Columbus Blue Jackets	0–2	Florida Panthers	7–15–5–1	20	L
29	December 6	Columbus Blue Jackets	0–1	Tampa Bay Lightning	7–16–5–1	20	L
30	December 8	Colorado Avalanche	2–0	Columbus Blue Jackets	7–17–5–1	20	L
31	December 10	New Jersey Devils	1–3	Columbus Blue Jackets	8–17–5–1	22	W
32	December 12	Columbus Blue Jackets	1–5	Colorado Avalanche	8–18–5–1	22	L
33	December 14	Columbus Blue Jackets	3–2	Mighty Ducks of Anaheim	9–18–5–1	24	W
34	December 15	Columbus Blue Jackets	2–3	Los Angeles Kings	9–19–5–1	24	L
35	December 17	Columbus Blue Jackets	1–4	Phoenix Coyotes	9–20–5–1	24	L
36	December 22	Dallas Stars	4–2	Columbus Blue Jackets	9–21–5–1	24	L
37	December 27	Columbus Blue Jackets	1–5	Detroit Red Wings	9–22–5–1	24	L
38	December 29	Buffalo Sabres	2–2	Columbus Blue Jackets	9–22–6–1	25	T
39	December 31	Mighty Ducks of Anaheim	1–3	Columbus Blue Jackets	10–22–6–1	27	W

January: 4–9–1–0 (home: 4–3–0–0; road: 0–6–1–0)

Game	Date	Visitor	Score	Home	Record	Pts	Recap
40	January 3	Columbus Blue Jackets	2–4	St. Louis Blues	10–23–6–1	27	L
41	January 6	Nashville Predators	3–4	Columbus Blue Jackets	11–23–6–1	29	W
42	January 9	Columbus Blue Jackets	3–6	Washington Capitals	11–24–6–1	29	L
43	January 10	Columbus Blue Jackets	1–2	Chicago Blackhawks	11–25–6–1	29	L
44	January 12	Chicago Blackhawks	4–5	Columbus Blue Jackets	12–25–6–1	31	W
45	January 14	Columbus Blue Jackets	2–2	New York Rangers	12–25–7–1	32	T
46	January 16	New York Rangers	0–2	Columbus Blue Jackets	13–25–7–1	34	W
47	January 18	Minnesota Wild	3–1	Columbus Blue Jackets	13–26–7–1	34	L
48	January 19	Columbus Blue Jackets	1–2	Nashville Predators	13–27–7–1	34	L
49	January 21	Dallas Stars	5–3	Columbus Blue Jackets	13–28–7–1	34	L
50	January 24	San Jose Sharks	2–6	Columbus Blue Jackets	14–28–7–1	36	W
51	January 26	Phoenix Coyotes	3–2	Columbus Blue Jackets	14–29–7–1	36	L
52	January 28	Columbus Blue Jackets	2–4	Dallas Stars	14–30–7–1	36	L
53	January 30	Columbus Blue Jackets	1–3	Mighty Ducks of Anaheim	14–31–7–1	36	L

February: 1–3–1–2 (home: 0–3–1–2; road: 1–0–0–0)

Game	Date	Visitor	Score	Home	Record	Pts	Recap
54	February 4	Boston Bruins	8–0	Columbus Blue Jackets	14–32–7–1	36	L
55	February 6	Ottawa Senators	6–4	Columbus Blue Jackets	14–33–7–1	36	L
56	February 8	Columbus Blue Jackets	3–2	Detroit Red Wings	15–33–7–1	38	W
57	February 9	Nashville Predators	1–0	Columbus Blue Jackets	15–33–7–2	39	OTL
58	February 12	Minnesota Wild	3–3	Columbus Blue Jackets	15–33–8–2	40	T
59	February 26	Los Angeles Kings	5–1	Columbus Blue Jackets	15–34–8–2	40	L
60	February 28	Pittsburgh Penguins	4–3	Columbus Blue Jackets	15–34–8–3	41	OTL

March: 5–8–0–2 (home: 2–2–0–1; road: 3–6–0–1)

Game	Date	Visitor	Score	Home	Record	Pts	Recap
61	March 2	Columbus Blue Jackets	2–0	Los Angeles Kings	16–34–8–3	43	W
62	March 3	Columbus Blue Jackets	1–2	Phoenix Coyotes	16–35–8–3	43	L
63	March 6	Columbus Blue Jackets	1–4	Colorado Avalanche	16–36–8–3	43	L
64	March 8	New York Islanders	2–4	Columbus Blue Jackets	17–36–8–3	45	W
65	March 10	Columbus Blue Jackets	0–5	Minnesota Wild	17–37–8–3	45	L
66	March 11	Columbus Blue Jackets	4–2	Pittsburgh Penguins	18–37–8–3	47	W
67	March 14	Vancouver Canucks	5–1	Columbus Blue Jackets	18–38–8–3	47	L
68	March 16	Calgary Flames	1–3	Columbus Blue Jackets	19–38–8–3	49	W
69	March 20	Columbus Blue Jackets	3–1	Minnesota Wild	20–38–8–3	51	W
70	March 21	Detroit Red Wings	3–2	Columbus Blue Jackets	20–38–8–4	52	OTL
71	March 23	Washington Capitals	5–2	Columbus Blue Jackets	20–39–8–4	52	L
72	March 25	Columbus Blue Jackets	1–6	Calgary Flames	20–40–8–4	52	L
73	March 26	Columbus Blue Jackets	1–3	Edmonton Oilers	20–41–8–4	52	L
74	March 28	Columbus Blue Jackets	3–4	Vancouver Canucks	20–41–8–5	53	OTL
75	March 30	Columbus Blue Jackets	2–10	San Jose Sharks	20–42–8–5	53	L

April: 2–5–0–0 (home: 2–1–0–0; road: 0–4–0–0)

Game	Date	Visitor	Score	Home	Record	Pts	Recap
76	April 1	Columbus Blue Jackets	1–3	Dallas Stars	20–43–8–5	53	L
77	April 4	Nashville Predators	1–2	Columbus Blue Jackets	21–43–8–5	55	W
78	April 6	Columbus Blue Jackets	1–4	Montreal Canadiens	21–44–8–5	55	L
79	April 8	Columbus Blue Jackets	1–4	Toronto Maple Leafs	21–45–8–5	55	L
80	April 10	San Jose Sharks	5–3	Columbus Blue Jackets	21–46–8–5	55	L
81	April 12	Atlanta Thrashers	4–5	Columbus Blue Jackets	22–46–8–5	57	W
82	April 14	Columbus Blue Jackets	0–2	Chicago Blackhawks	22–47–8–5	57	L

Legend: W Win (2 points) L Loss (0 points) T Tie (1 point) OTL Overtime loss (1 point)

== Player statistics ==
=== Scoring ===
- Position abbreviations: C = Center; D = Defense; G = Goaltender; LW = Left wing; RW = Right wing
- † = Joined team via a transaction (e.g., trade, waivers, signing) during the season. Stats reflect time with the Blue Jackets only.
- ‡ = Left team via a transaction (e.g., trade, waivers, release) during the season. Stats reflect time with the Blue Jackets only.

No.	Player	Pos	Regular season					
No.	Player	Pos	GP	G	A	Pts	+/-	PIM
14	Ray Whitney	LW	67	21	40	61	−22	12
16	Mike Sillinger	C	80	20	23	43	−35	54
21	Espen Knutsen	C	77	11	31	42	−28	47
29	Grant Marshall	RW	81	15	18	33	−20	86
9	David Vyborny	RW	75	13	18	31	−14	6
7	Deron Quint	D	75	7	18	25	−34	26
28	Tyler Wright	C	77	13	11	24	−40	100
8	Geoff Sanderson	LW	42	11	5	16	−15	12
10	Serge Aubin	LW	71	8	8	16	−20	32
44	Rostislav Klesla	D	75	8	8	16	−6	74
4	Lyle Odelein‡	D	65	2	14	16	−28	89
18	Robert Kron	LW	59	4	11	15	−14	4
42	Brett Harkins	LW	25	2	12	14	−5	8
11	Kevin Dineen	RW	59	5	8	13	−6	62
37	Mattias Timander	D	78	4	7	11	−34	44
27	Blake Sloan‡	RW	60	2	7	9	−18	46
34	Jean-Luc Grand-Pierre	D	81	2	6	8	−28	90
45	Jody Shelley	LW	52	3	3	6	1	206
32	Radim Bicanek	D	60	1	5	6	−15	34
5	Jamie Pushor‡	D	61	0	6	6	−10	54
22	Chris Nielsen	RW	23	2	3	5	−3	4
3	Jaroslav Spacek†	D	14	2	3	5	−9	24
12	Sean Pronger	C	26	3	1	4	−4	4
41	Matt Davidson	RW	17	1	2	3	−11	10
6	Jamie Heward	D	28	1	2	3	−9	7
19	Mathieu Darche	LW	14	1	1	2	−5	6
26	Andrej Nedorost	LW	7	0	2	2	−3	2
20	Martin Spanhel	LW	4	1	0	1	−2	2
23	Derrick Walser	D	2	1	0	1	−2	0
38	Blake Bellefeuille	C	2	0	1	1	1	0
30	Marc Denis	G	42	0	1	1		2
31	Ron Tugnutt	G	44	0	1	1		0
33	Jamie Allison†	D	7	0	0	0	−4	28
1	Jean-Francois Labbe	G	3	0	0	0		0
43	David Ling	RW	5	0	0	0	−1	7
40	Brad Moran	C	3	0	0	0	0	0
40	Duvie Westcott	D	4	0	0	0	−2	2

=== Goaltending ===
No.	Player	Regular season									
No.	Player	GP	W	L	T	SA	GA	GAA	SV%	SO	TOI
31	Ron Tugnutt	44	12	27	3	1195	119	2.85	.900	2	2502
30	Marc Denis	42	9	24	5	1197	121	3.11	.899	1	2335
1	Jean-Francois Labbe	3	1	1	0	68	6	3.08	.912	0	117

== Awards and records ==
=== Awards ===
Type	Award/honor	Recipient	Ref
League (annual)	NHL All-Rookie Team	Rostislav Klesla (Defense)	
League (in-season)	NHL All-Star Game selection	Espen Knutsen (Note: Knutsen was an injury replacement for Jere Lehtinen of the Dallas Stars.)	
League (in-season)	NHL YoungStars Game selection	Rostislav Klesla (Note: Klesla did not play and was replaced by Paul Mara of the Phoenix Coyotes.)	
Team	Three Stars Award	Ray Whitney	

=== Milestones ===
Milestone	Player	Date	Ref
First game	Blake Bellefeuille	November 27, 2001	
First game	Brad Moran	January 28, 2002	
First game	Duvie Westcott	March 16, 2002	
First game	Andrej Nedorost	March 30, 2002	
First game	Derrick Walser	April 10, 2002	

== Transactions ==
The Blue Jackets were involved in the following transactions from June 10, 2001, the day after the deciding game of the 2001 Stanley Cup Final, through June 13, 2002, the day of the deciding game of the 2002 Stanley Cup Final.

=== Trades ===
Date	Details		Ref
June 24, 2001	To Columbus Blue Jackets: Rights to Paul Manning	To Calgary Flames: 5th-round pick in 2001	
August 29, 2001	To Columbus Blue Jackets: Grant Marshall	To Dallas Stars: 2nd-round pick in 2003	
September 28, 2001	To Columbus Blue Jackets: Evgeny Petrochinin	To Dallas Stars: Kirk Muller	
March 15, 2002	To Columbus Blue Jackets: 4th-round pick in 2003	To Pittsburgh Penguins: Jamie Pushor	
March 19, 2002	To Columbus Blue Jackets: Jaroslav Spacek; 2nd-round pick in 2003	To Chicago Blackhawks: Lyle Odelein	
March 19, 2002	To Columbus Blue Jackets: Jamie Allison	To Calgary Flames: Blake Sloan	

=== Players acquired ===
Date	Player	Former team	Term	Via	Ref
July 5, 2001	Mike Sillinger	Ottawa Senators	3-year	Free agency	
July 10, 2001	David Ling	Dallas Stars		Free agency	
July 10, 2001	Darrel Scoville	Calgary Flames		Free agency	
September 17, 2001	Derrick Walser	Calgary Flames	1-year	Free agency	
September 28, 2001	Kirk Muller	Dallas Stars		Waiver draft	

=== Players lost ===
Date	Player	New team	Via (Note: In parentheses is the player's free agency group on July 1 if applicable.)	Ref
N/A	Michael Gaul	HC Fribourg-Gotteron (NLA)	Free agency (VI)	
June 21, 2001	Reggie Savage	EHC Biel-Bienne (NLB)	Free agency (VI)	
July 1, 2001	Petteri Nummelin	HC Lugano (NLA)	Free agency (II) (Note: Columbus retained Nummelin’s NHL rights until trading them to the Atlanta Thrashers on December 2, 2002.)	
July 7, 2001	Mike Maneluk	HC Lugano (NLA)	Free agency (UFA)	
August 15, 2001	Sean Selmser	Hamilton Bulldogs (AHL)	Free agency (UFA)	
August 16, 2001	Alexander Selivanov	Frankfurt Lions (DEL)	Free agency (UFA)	
September 26, 2001	Scott Hollis	Flint Generals (UHL)	Free agency (UFA)	
October 8, 2001	Jeff Williams	Brynas IF (SHL)	Free agency (VI)	
October 21, 2001	Bruce Gardiner	New Jersey Devils	Free agency (UFA)	
February 1, 2002	Jeff Ware		Retirement	
April 17, 2002	Jamie Heward	Geneve-Servette HC (NLA)	Free agency	

=== Signings ===
Date	Player	Term	Contract type	Ref
June 20, 2001	Andrej Nedorost		Entry-level	
June 20, 2001	Martin Paroulek		Entry-level	
July 9, 2001	Blake Sloan	multi-year	Re-signing	
July 2001	Kevin Dineen	1-year	Re-signing	
July 13, 2001	Tyler Wright	multi-year	Re-signing	
July 31, 2001	Matt Davidson	1-year	Re-signing	
July 31, 2001	Greg Gardner	1-year	Re-signing	
July 31, 2001	Andriy Sryubko	1-year	Re-signing	
July 31, 2001	Mattias Timander	1-year	Re-signing	
August 3, 2001	Jamie Pushor	1-year	Re-signing	
August 23, 2001	Geoff Sanderson	1-year	Re-signing	
September 24, 2001	Deron Quint		Re-signing	
October 17, 2001	Shane Bendera	multi-year	Entry-level	
April 22, 2002	Jody Shelley	multi-year	Extension	
April 23, 2002	Pascal Leclaire	multi-year	Entry-level	
May 28, 2002	Scott Heffernan	multi-year	Entry-level	
May 28, 2002	Sean Pronger	multi-year	Extension	
May 28, 2002	David Vyborny	1-year	Extension	
June 6, 2002	Ben Knopp	multi-year	Entry-level	

== Draft picks ==
Columubus' draft picks at the 2001 NHL entry draft.

Round	#	Player	Nationality	College/Junior/Club team (League)
1	8	Pascal Leclaire	Canada	Halifax Mooseheads (QMJHL)
2	38	Tim Jackman	United States	Minnesota State University, Mankato (WCHA)
2	53	Kiel McLeod	Canada	Kelowna Rockets (WHL)
3	85	Aaron Johnson	Canada	Rimouski Oceanic (QMJHL)
3	87	Per Mars	Sweden	Brynas IF (Sweden)
5	141	Cole Jarrett	Canada	Plymouth Whalers (OHL)
6	173	Justin Aikins	Canada	Langley Hornets (BCHL)
6	187	Artyom Vostrikov	Russia	Lada Togliatti-2 (Russia)
7	204	Raffaele Sannitz	Switzerland	HC Lugano (Switzerland)
8	236	Ryan Bowness	Canada	Brampton Battalion (OHL)
8	242	Andrew Murray	Canada	Selkirk Steelers (MJHL)
