= 2001–02 Edmonton Oilers season =

NHL team season

2001–02 Edmonton Oilers
- Division: 3rd Northwest
- Conference: 9th Western
- 2001–02 record: 38–28–12–4
- Home record: 23–14–4–0
- Road record: 15–14–8–4
- Goals for: 205
- Goals against: 182

Team information
- General manager: Kevin Lowe
- Coach: Craig MacTavish
- Captain: Jason Smith
- Alternate captains: Mike Grier; Todd Marchant; Rem Murray (Oct.–Mar.); Janne Niinimaa (Mar.–Apr.); Ryan Smyth
- Arena: Skyreach Centre
- Average attendance: 16,587 (98.5%)
- Minor league affiliates: Hamilton Bulldogs (AHL); Columbus Cottonmouths (ECHL)

Team leaders
- Goals: Mike Comrie (33)
- Assists: Janne Niinimaa (39)
- Points: Mike Comrie (60); Anson Carter (60)
- Penalty minutes: Georges Laraque (157)
- Plus/minus: Mike Comrie (+16)
- Wins: Tommy Salo (30)
- Goals against average: Tommy Salo (2.22)

The 2001–02 Edmonton Oilers season was the Oilers' 23rd season in the National Hockey League, and they were coming off a 39–28–12–3 record in 2000–01, earning 93 points, the highest point total the Oilers had achieved since the 1987–88 season, when they earned 99 points. The Oilers would meet the Dallas Stars in the opening round of the playoffs, and lose in six games.

During the off-season, Edmonton traded Doug Weight to the St. Louis Blues, along with Michel Riesen for Marty Reasoner, Jochen Hecht and Jan Horacek. With the trading of the captain, the Oilers named defenceman Jason Smith the new captain of the club.

Despite the loss of Weight, the Oilers got off to a great start, and on December 16, they sat at the top of the Northwest Division with 43 points. Edmonton would then slump, going 9–16–7–1 in their next 33 games to drop them out of the playoff picture. The club would then go on a 9-game unbeaten streak, and despite finishing the year with a 38–28–12–4 record, good for 90 points, they would miss the playoffs for the first time since the 1995–96 season, finishing two points behind the eighth place Vancouver Canucks.

Offensively, Edmonton-born Mike Comrie led the club with 33 goals and 60 points, while Anson Carter scored 28 goals and also earn 60 points. Ryan Smyth earned 50 points in only 61 games. Janne Niinimaa led the club with 39 assists, and led the defense with 44 points. Georges Laraque provided the club toughness, earning 157 penalty minutes.

In goal, Tommy Salo would have arguably the best season ever by an Oilers goaltender, winning 30 games, posting a club record 2.22 goals against average (GAA) and earning five shutouts. The 182 goals the Oilers allowed was a club record for fewest in a season and the second lowest total in the NHL during the season.

== Season standings ==
Northwest Division
No.	CR		GP	W	L	T	OTL	GF	GA	Pts
1	2	**Colorado Avalanche**	82	45	28	8	1	212	169	99
2	8	**Vancouver Canucks**	82	42	30	7	3	254	211	94
3	9	Edmonton Oilers	82	38	28	12	4	205	182	92
4	11	Calgary Flames	82	32	35	12	3	201	220	79
5	12	Minnesota Wild	82	26	35	12	9	195	238	73

Note: CR = Conference rank; GP = Games played; W = Wins; L = Losses; T = Ties; OTL = Overtime loss; GF = Goals for; GA = Goals against; Pts = Points
Bolded teams qualified for the playoffs.

Western Conference
R		Div	GP	W	L	T	OTL	GF	GA	Pts
**1**	**p – Detroit Red Wings**	**CEN**	**82**	**51**	**17**	**10**	**4**	**251**	**187**	**116**
**2**	**y – Colorado Avalanche**	**NW**	**82**	**45**	**28**	**8**	**1**	**212**	**169**	**99**
**3**	**y – San Jose Sharks**	**PAC**	**82**	**44**	**27**	**8**	**3**	**248**	**199**	**99**
**4**	**St. Louis Blues**	**CEN**	**82**	**43**	**27**	**8**	**4**	**227**	**188**	**98**
**5**	**Chicago Blackhawks**	**CEN**	**82**	**41**	**27**	**13**	**1**	**216**	**207**	**96**
**6**	**Phoenix Coyotes**	**PAC**	**82**	**40**	**27**	**9**	**6**	**228**	**210**	**95**
**7**	**Los Angeles Kings**	**PAC**	**82**	**40**	**27**	**11**	**4**	**214**	**190**	**95**
**8**	**Vancouver Canucks**	**NW**	**82**	**42**	**30**	**7**	**3**	**254**	**211**	**94**
8.5
9	Edmonton Oilers	NW	82	38	28	12	4	205	182	92
10	Dallas Stars	PAC	82	36	28	13	5	215	213	90
11	Calgary Flames	NW	82	32	35	12	3	201	220	79
12	Minnesota Wild	NW	82	26	35	12	9	195	238	73
13	Mighty Ducks of Anaheim	PAC	82	29	42	8	3	175	198	69
14	Nashville Predators	CEN	82	28	41	13	0	196	230	69
15	Columbus Blue Jackets	CEN	82	22	47	8	5	164	255	57

Divisions: CEN – Central, PAC – Pacific, NW – Northwest

bold – Qualified for playoffs; p – Won Presidents' Trophy; y – Won division

== Schedule and results ==
2001–02 regular season
October: 9–4–1–0 (home: 6–2–0–0; road: 3–2–1–0)

Game	Date	Visitor	Score	Home	OT	Decision	Attendance	Record	Pts	Recap
1	October 3	Edmonton Oilers	0 – 1	Calgary Flames		Salo	16,242	0–1–0–0	0	L
2	October 6	Phoenix Coyotes	2 – 6	Edmonton Oilers		Salo	16,839	1–1–0–0	2	W
3	October 9	Chicago Blackhawks	0 – 1	Edmonton Oilers		Salo	14,191	2–1–0–0	4	W
4	October 11	Colorado Avalanche	3 – 5	Edmonton Oilers		Salo	15,843	3–1–0–0	6	W
5	October 13	Edmonton Oilers	4 – 3	Nashville Predators		Salo	13,117	4–1–0–0	8	W
6	October 14	Edmonton Oilers	3 – 3	Minnesota Wild	OT	Salo	18,064	4–1–1–0	9	T
7	October 16	Toronto Maple Leafs	4 – 1	Edmonton Oilers		Salo	16,839	4–2–1–0	9	L
8	October 18	Edmonton Oilers	4 – 1	Colorado Avalanche		Salo	18,007	5–2–1–0	11	W
9	October 20	Florida Panthers	2 – 6	Edmonton Oilers		Conklin	16,839	6–2–1–0	13	W
10	October 22	Nashville Predators	4 – 2	Edmonton Oilers		Salo	15,281	6–3–1–0	13	L
11	October 24	Edmonton Oilers	1 – 4	Detroit Red Wings		Salo	20,058	6–4–1–0	13	L
12	October 25	Edmonton Oilers	5 – 2	Columbus Blue Jackets		Conklin	18,136	7–4–1–0	15	W
13	October 27	Vancouver Canucks	2 – 3	Edmonton Oilers		Salo	16,839	8–4–1–0	17	W
14	October 30	Montreal Canadiens	1 – 3	Edmonton Oilers		Salo	16,367	9–4–1–0	19	W

November: 7–3–2–1 (home: 2–2–0–0; road: 5–1–2–1)

Game	Date	Visitor	Score	Home	OT	Decision	Attendance	Record	Pts	Recap
15	November 2	Columbus Blue Jackets	2 – 1	Edmonton Oilers		Salo	15,944	9–5–1–0	19	L
16	November 4	Edmonton Oilers	2 – 0	Minnesota Wild		Salo	18,064	10–5–1–0	21	W
17	November 6	Edmonton Oilers	0 – 1	Boston Bruins	OT	Salo	12,134	10–5–1–1	22	OTL
18	November 9	Edmonton Oilers	3 – 0	Columbus Blue Jackets		Salo	18,136	11–5–1–1	24	W
19	November 11	Edmonton Oilers	1 – 1	Carolina Hurricanes	OT	Salo	12,390	11–5–2–1	25	T
20	November 13	Edmonton Oilers	5 – 4	Phoenix Coyotes	OT	Salo	10,512	12–5–2–1	27	W
21	November 16	Chicago Blackhawks	1 – 7	Edmonton Oilers		Salo	16,839	13–5–2–1	29	W
22	November 17	Edmonton Oilers	2 – 2	Vancouver Canucks	OT	Salo	18,422	13–5–3–1	30	T
23	November 20	St. Louis Blues	0 – 2	Edmonton Oilers		Salo	16,839	14–5–3–1	32	W
24	November 22	Los Angeles Kings	4 – 2	Edmonton Oilers		Salo	16,434	14–6–3–1	32	L
25	November 24	Edmonton Oilers	0 – 2	Colorado Avalanche		Salo	18,007	14–7–3–1	32	L
26	November 28	Edmonton Oilers	2 – 0	Mighty Ducks of Anaheim		Markkanen	9,527	15–7–3–1	34	W
27	November 29	Edmonton Oilers	3 – 1	Los Angeles Kings		Salo	15,643	16–7–3–1	36	W

December: 5–6–3–1 (home: 4–3–0–0; road: 1–3–3–1)

Game	Date	Visitor	Score	Home	OT	Decision	Attendance	Record	Pts	Recap
28	December 1	Dallas Stars	6 – 4	Edmonton Oilers		Salo	16,839	16–8–3–1	36	L
29	December 5	Mighty Ducks of Anaheim	2 – 3	Edmonton Oilers	OT	Salo	15,545	17–8–3–1	38	W
30	December 7	Edmonton Oilers	0 – 5	Dallas Stars		Salo	18,532	17–9–3–1	38	L
31	December 8	Edmonton Oilers	2 – 2	Nashville Predators	OT	Salo	14,158	17–9–4–1	39	T
32	December 11	Edmonton Oilers	4 – 5	San Jose Sharks	OT	Salo	17,496	17–9–4–2	40	OTL
33	December 13	Detroit Red Wings	2 – 1	Edmonton Oilers		Salo	16,839	17–10–4–2	40	L
34	December 14	Tampa Bay Lightning	1 – 2	Edmonton Oilers		Markkanen	16,272	18–10–4–2	42	W
35	December 16	Edmonton Oilers	3 – 2	Philadelphia Flyers		Salo	19,343	19–10–4–2	44	W
36	December 18	Edmonton Oilers	1 – 4	New York Islanders		Salo	10,551	19–11–4–2	44	L
37	December 20	Edmonton Oilers	3 – 3	New Jersey Devils	OT	Salo	14,150	19–11–5–2	45	T
38	December 21	Edmonton Oilers	1 – 5	Chicago Blackhawks		Salo	14,326	19–12–5–2	45	L
39	December 26	Calgary Flames	2 – 3	Edmonton Oilers		Salo	16,839	20–12–5–2	47	W
40	December 28	Minnesota Wild	2 – 3	Edmonton Oilers		Markkanen	16,839	21–12–5–2	49	W
41	December 30	New Jersey Devils	2 – 1	Edmonton Oilers		Salo	16,839	21–13–5–2	49	L
42	December 31	Edmonton Oilers	2 – 2	Calgary Flames	OT	Salo	17,409	21–13–6–2	50	T

January: 4–7–3–0 (home: 4–4–2–0; road: 0–3–1–0)

Game	Date	Visitor	Score	Home	OT	Decision	Attendance	Record	Pts	Recap
43	January 2	New York Rangers	1 – 4	Edmonton Oilers		Salo	16,839	22–13–6–2	52	W
44	January 5	Vancouver Canucks	4 – 3	Edmonton Oilers		Salo	16,839	22–14–6–2	52	L
45	January 6	Montreal Canadiens	6 – 7	Edmonton Oilers		Salo	16,839	23–14–6–2	54	W
46	January 10	Carolina Hurricanes	4 – 1	Edmonton Oilers		Salo	16,322	23–15–6–2	54	L
47	January 12	Colorado Avalanche	2 – 2	Edmonton Oilers	OT	Salo	16,839	23–15–7–2	55	T
48	January 14	Edmonton Oilers	1 – 2	Chicago Blackhawks		Salo	12,887	23–16–7–2	55	L
49	January 15	Edmonton Oilers	2 – 3	St. Louis Blues		Markkanen	19,729	23–17–7–2	55	L
50	January 18	Mighty Ducks of Anaheim	1 – 3	Edmonton Oilers		Salo	16,558	24–17–7–2	57	W
51	January 19	Pittsburgh Penguins	1 – 0	Edmonton Oilers		Salo	16,839	24–18–7–2	57	L
52	January 21	Edmonton Oilers	3 – 4	San Jose Sharks		Salo	17,496	24–19–7–2	57	L
53	January 23	Colorado Avalanche	4 – 2	Edmonton Oilers		Salo	16,634	24–20–7–2	57	L
54	January 26	Toronto Maple Leafs	1 – 4	Edmonton Oilers		Salo	16,839	25–20–7–2	59	W
55	January 28	Detroit Red Wings	1 – 1	Edmonton Oilers	OT	Salo	16,839	25–20–8–2	60	T
56	January 30	Edmonton Oilers	2 – 2	Vancouver Canucks	OT	Salo	18,422	25–20–9–2	61	T

February: 1–4–1–0 (home: 0–2–0–0; road: 1–2–1–0)

Game	Date	Visitor	Score	Home	OT	Decision	Attendance	Record	Pts	Recap
57	February 5	Edmonton Oilers	2 – 3	Atlanta Thrashers		Markkanen	10,875	25–21–9–2	61	L
58	February 7	Edmonton Oilers	1 – 3	St. Louis Blues		Salo	18,632	25–22–9–2	61	L
59	February 8	Edmonton Oilers	1 – 1	Dallas Stars	OT	Markkanen	18,532	25–22–10–2	62	T
60	February 10	Edmonton Oilers	4 – 3	Phoenix Coyotes		Salo	12,147	26–22–10–2	64	W
61	February 12	San Jose Sharks	3 – 2	Edmonton Oilers		Salo	16,839	26–23–10–2	64	L
62	February 28	Nashville Predators	3 – 2	Edmonton Oilers		Salo	16,585	26–24–10–2	64	L

March: 9–2–2–1 (home: 5–0–2–0; road: 4–2–0–1)

Game	Date	Visitor	Score	Home	OT	Decision	Attendance	Record	Pts	Recap
63	March 2	St. Louis Blues	1 – 1	Edmonton Oilers	OT	Markkanen	16,839	26–24–11–2	65	T
64	March 4	Edmonton Oilers	3 – 0	Buffalo Sabres		Markkanen	16,661	27–24–11–2	67	W
65	March 6	Edmonton Oilers	3 – 2	Tampa Bay Lightning		Salo	13,256	28–24–11–2	69	W
66	March 8	Edmonton Oilers	4 – 5	Florida Panthers		Markkanen	15,914	28–25–11–2	69	L
67	March 10	Edmonton Oilers	2 – 4	Washington Capitals		Salo	18,672	28–26–11–2	69	L
68	March 13	Edmonton Oilers	3 – 4	Detroit Red Wings	OT	Markkanen	20,058	28–26–11–3	70	OTL
69	March 14	Edmonton Oilers	4 – 1	Ottawa Senators		Salo	18,397	29–26–11–3	72	W
70	March 16	Washington Capitals	1 – 4	Edmonton Oilers		Salo	16,839	30–26–11–3	74	W
71	March 20	San Jose Sharks	1 – 2	Edmonton Oilers		Salo	16,839	31–26–11–3	76	W
72	March 23	Calgary Flames	1 – 3	Edmonton Oilers		Salo	16,839	32–26–11–3	78	W
73	March 24	Edmonton Oilers	2 – 0	Vancouver Canucks		Salo	18,422	33–26–11–3	80	W
74	March 26	Columbus Blue Jackets	1 – 3	Edmonton Oilers		Markkanen	16,639	34–26–11–3	82	W
75	March 28	Los Angeles Kings	2 – 2	Edmonton Oilers	OT	Salo	16,839	34–26–12–3	83	T
76	March 30	Dallas Stars	1 – 3	Edmonton Oilers		Salo	16,839	35–26–12–3	85	W

April: 3–2–0–1 (home: 2–1–0–0; road: 1–1–0–1)

Game	Date	Visitor	Score	Home	OT	Decision	Attendance	Record	Pts	Recap
77	April 2	Minnesota Wild	1 – 2	Edmonton Oilers	OT	Salo	16,839	36–26–12–3	87	W
78	April 5	Edmonton Oilers	0 – 2	Mighty Ducks of Anaheim		Salo	13,369	36–27–12–3	87	L
79	April 6	Edmonton Oilers	3 – 4	Los Angeles Kings	OT	Salo	18,311	36–27–12–4	88	OTL
80	April 10	Phoenix Coyotes	0 – 3	Edmonton Oilers		Salo	16,839	37–27–12–4	90	W
81	April 12	Calgary Flames	2 – 0	Edmonton Oilers		Salo	16,839	37–28–12–4	90	L
82	April 14	Edmonton Oilers	4 – 2	Minnesota Wild		Markkanen	18,568	38–28–12–4	92	W

Legend: W Win (2 points) L Loss (0 points) T Tie (1 point) OTL Overtime loss (1 point)

== Player statistics ==
=== Scoring ===
- Position abbreviations: C = Centre; D = Defence; G = Goaltender; LW = Left wing; RW = Right wing
- † = Joined team via a transaction (e.g., trade, waivers, signing) during the season. Stats reflect time with the Oilers only.
- ‡ = Left team via a transaction (e.g., trade, waivers, release) during the season. Stats reflect time with the Oilers only.

No.	Player	Pos	Regular season					
No.	Player	Pos	GP	G	A	Pts	+/-	PIM
89	Mike Comrie	C	82	33	27	60	16	45
22	Anson Carter	RW	82	28	32	60	3	25
94	Ryan Smyth	LW	61	15	35	50	7	48
44	Janne Niinimaa	D	81	5	39	44	13	80
20	Jochen Hecht	LW	82	16	24	40	4	60
26	Todd Marchant	C	82	12	22	34	7	41
7	Daniel Cleary	RW	65	10	19	29	−1	51
25	Mike Grier	RW	82	8	17	25	1	32
2	Eric Brewer	D	81	7	18	25	−5	45
16 (Note: Murray wore number 17 in the season opener.)	Rem Murray‡	C	69	7	17	24	5	14
10	Shawn Horcoff	LW	61	8	14	22	3	18
27	Georges Laraque	RW	80	5	14	19	6	157
21	Jason Smith	D	74	5	13	18	14	103
5	Tom Poti‡	D	55	1	16	17	−6	42
18	Ethan Moreau	LW	80	11	5	16	4	81
12	Josh Green	LW	61	10	5	15	9	52
15	Marty Reasoner	C	52	6	5	11	0	41
23	Sean Brown‡	D	61	6	4	10	8	127
24	Steve Staios	D	73	5	5	10	10	108
14	Domenic Pittis	LW	22	0	6	6	−2	8
32	Scott Ferguson	D	50	3	2	5	11	75
16	Mike York†	RW	12	2	2	4	−1	0
37	Brian Swanson	C	8	1	1	2	−1	0
28	Jason Chimera	C	3	1	0	1	−3	0
35	Tommy Salo	G	69	0	1	1		2
19	Sven Butenschon	D	14	0	0	0	0	4
1	Ty Conklin	G	4	0	0	0		0
30	Jussi Markkanen	G	14	0	0	0		0
45	Ales Pisa	D	2	0	0	0	0	2
46	Jani Rita	LW	1	0	0	0	0	0

=== Goaltending ===
No.	Player	Regular season									
No.	Player	GP	W	L	T	SA	GA	GAA	SV%	SO	TOI
35	Tommy Salo	69	30	28	10	1713	149	2.22	.913	6	4035
30	Jussi Markkanen	14	6	4	2	336	24	1.84	.929	2	784
1	Ty Conklin	4	2	0	0	66	4	1.62	.939	0	148

== Awards and records ==
=== Awards ===
Type	Award/honour	Recipient	Ref
League (in-season)	NHL All-Star Game selection	Tommy Salo	
League (in-season)	NHL Player of the Week	Tommy Salo (March 25)	
League (in-season)	NHL YoungStars Game selection	Mike Comrie	
Team	Community Service Award	Georges Laraque	
Team	Defenceman of the Year	Janne Niinimaa	
Team	Molson Cup	Tommy Salo	
Team	Most Popular Player	Mike Comrie	
Team	Top Defensive Forward	Todd Marchant	
Team	Top First Year Oiler	Not awarded	
Team	Unsung Hero	Steve Staios	
Team	Zane Feldman Trophy	Tommy Salo	

=== Records ===
- 15: A new Oilers record for most shutouts in a career by Tommy Salo on March 24, 2002.

=== Milestones ===
Regular Season
Player	Milestone	Reached
Janne Niinimaa	400th NHL Game	October 6, 2001
Anson Carter	100th NHL PIM	October 9, 2001
Tommy Salo	25th shutout	October 9, 2001
Scott Ferguson	1st NHL Goal	October 11, 2001
Steve Staios	500th NHL PIM	October 11, 2001
Georges Laraque	400th NHL PIM	October 14, 2001
Ty Conklin	1st NHL Game	October 16, 2001
Janne Niinimaa	400th NHL PIM; 200th NHL Point	October 18, 2001
Anson Carter	300th NHL Game; 200th NHL Point; 1st NHL Gordie Howe hat trick	October 20, 2001
Ty Conklin	1st NHL Win	October 20, 2001
Marty Reasoner	100th NHL Game	November 2, 2001
Anson Carter	100th NHL Goal	November 13, 2001
Jochen Hecht	100th NHL PIM	November 22, 2001
Jussi Markkanen	1st NHL Game; 1st NHL Win; 1st NHL Shutout	November 28, 2001
Sean Brown	600th NHL PIM	November 29, 2001
Josh Green	100th NHL Game	December 8, 2001
Ethan Moreau	1st NHL Gordie Howe hat trick	December 8, 2001
Eric Brewer	200th NHL Game	December 14, 2001
Mike Grier	400th NHL Game	December 14, 2001
Tom Poti	100th NHL Point	December 16, 2001
Jason Chimera	1st NHL Goal	December 18, 2001
Ethan Moreau	400th NHL Game	December 20, 2001
Jochen Hecht	100th NHL Point	January 6, 2002
Georges Laraque	500th NHL PIM	January 18, 2002
Rem Murray	400th NHL Game	January 23, 2002
Shawn Horcoff	100th NHL Game	February 7, 2002
Mike Comrie	100th NHL Game	February 8, 2002
Ethan Moreau	500th NHL PIM	February 8, 2002
Josh Green	100th NHL PIM	February 12, 2002
Jochen Hecht	200th NHL Game	February 28, 2002
Jani Rita	1st NHL Game	March 2, 2002
Daniel Cleary	100th NHL PIM	March 8, 2002
Tom Poti	200th NHL PIM	March 8, 2002
Ryan Smyth	300th NHL Point	March 8, 2002
Tommy Salo	400th NHL Game	March 10, 2002
Mike Grier	100th NHL Assist	March 20, 2002
Ales Pisa	1st NHL Game	March 20, 2002
Jason Smith	600th NHL PIM	March 23, 2002
Daniel Cleary	200th NHL Game	April 5, 2002
Janne Niinimaa	200th NHL Assist	April 6, 2002
Todd Marchant	600th NHL Game	April 10, 2002
Tommy Salo	30th NHL Shutout	April 10, 2002

== Transactions ==
The Oilers were involved in the following transactions from June 10, 2001, the day after the deciding game of the 2001 Stanley Cup Final, through June 13, 2002, the day of the deciding game of the 2002 Stanley Cup Final.

=== Trades ===
Date	Details		Ref
June 29, 2001	To Minnesota Wild: Sergei Zholtok	To Edmonton Oilers: Future considerations (Note: 7th-round pick in 2002)	
July 1, 2001	To St. Louis Blues: Michel Riesen; Doug Weight	To Edmonton Oilers: Jochen Hecht; Jan Horacek; Marty Reasoner	
March 19, 2002	To Boston Bruins: Sean Brown	To Edmonton Oilers: Bobby Allen	
March 19, 2002	To New York Rangers: Rem Murray; Tom Poti	To Edmonton Oilers: Mike York; 4th-round pick in 2002	

=== Players acquired ===
Date	Player	Former team	Term	Via	Ref
July 12, 2001	Steve Staios	Atlanta Thrashers	multi-year	Free agency	
July 17, 2001	Jan Benda	Jokerit (Liiga)	1-year	Free agency	
July 17, 2001	Greg Leeb	Dallas Stars	1-year	Free agency	
August 15, 2001	Sean Selmser	Columbus Blue Jackets		Free agency	
August 16, 2001	Marc Lamothe	Columbus Blue Jackets	1-year	Free agency	
August 16, 2001	Jared Smyth	Tallahassee Tiger Sharks (ECHL)		Free agency	
May 28, 2002	Mike Bishai	Hamilton Bulldogs (AHL)		Free agency	
May 28, 2002	Nate DiCasmirro	Hamilton Bulldogs (AHL)		Free agency	

=== Players lost ===
Date	Player	New team	Via (Note: In parentheses is the player's free agency group on July 1 if applicable.)	Ref
N/A	Patrick Cote	Laval Chiefs (QSPHL)	Free agency (UFA)	
N/A	Frank Musil	HC Dukla Jihlava (ELH)	Free agency (III)	
N/A	Dominic Roussel	LaSalle Rapides (QSPHL)	Free agency (III)	
July 1, 2001	Igor Ulanov	New York Rangers	Free agency (III)	
July 1, 2001	Brian Urick (Note: Urick retired.)		Contract expiration (UFA)	
July 8, 2001	Brett Hauer	Los Angeles Kings	Free agency (VI)	
July 24, 2001	Paul Healey	Toronto Maple Leafs	Free agency (VI)	
July 27, 2001	Brad Norton	Florida Panthers	Free agency (VI)	
August 2, 2001	Terran Sandwith	Belfast Giants (BISL)	Free agency (VI)	
August 12, 2001	Joaquin Gage	Ayr Scottish Eagles (BISL)	Free agency (VI)	
August 14, 2001	Rory Fitzpatrick	Buffalo Sabres	Free agency (VI)	
August 31, 2001	Paul Comrie		Retirement	
N/A	Eric Heffler	New Haven Knights (UHL)	Free agency (UFA)	

=== Signings ===
Date	Player	Term	Contract type	Ref
June 12, 2001	Fernando Pisani		Entry-level	
July 14, 2001	Jani Rita	multi-year	Entry-level	
July 16, 2001	Kari Haakana		Entry-level	
July 16, 2001	Jussi Markkanen		Entry-level	
July 16, 2001	Ales Pisa		Entry-level	
July 17, 2001	Alexander Lyubimov	3-year	Entry-level	
July 30, 2001	Jochen Hecht	3-year	Re-signing	
July 31, 2001	Daniel Cleary	3-year	Re-signing	
July 31, 2001	Chris Hajt	1-year	Re-signing	
August 1, 2001	Sven Butenschon	1-year	Re-signing	
August 1, 2001	Josh Green	1-year	Re-signing	
August 1, 2001	Marty Reasoner	2-year	Re-signing	
August 3, 2001	Janne Niinimaa	3-year	Re-signing	
August 9, 2001	Alain Nasreddine	1-year	Re-signing	
August 9, 2001	Brian Swanson	2-year	Re-signing	
August 15, 2001	Eric Brewer	1-year	Re-signing	
October 17, 2001	Tom Poti	1-year	Re-signing	
June 5, 2002	Jussi Markkanen	1-year	Option exercised	

== Draft picks ==
Edmonton's draft picks at the 2001 NHL entry draft.

Round	#	Player	Nationality	College/Junior/Club team (League)
1	13	Ales Hemsky	Czech Republic	Hull Olympiques (QMJHL)
2	43	Doug Lynch	Canada	Red Deer Rebels (WHL)
2	52	Ed Caron	United States	Phillips Exeter Academy (USHS-NH)
3	84	Kenny Smith	United States	Harvard University (NCAA)
5	133	Jussi Markkanen	Finland	Tappara (SM-liiga)
5	154	Jake Brenk	United States	Breck School (USHS)
6	185	Mikael Svensk	Sweden	Frölunda HC (Sweden)
7	215	Dan Baum	Canada	Prince George Cougars (WHL)
8	248	Kari Haakana	Finland	Jokerit (SM-liiga)
9	272	Ales Pisa	Czech Republic	HC Pardubice (Czech.)
9	278	Shay Stephenson	Canada	Red Deer Rebels (WHL)
