= 2001–02 Dallas Stars season =

National Hockey League team season

2001–02 Dallas Stars
- Division: 4th Pacific
- Conference: 10th Western
- 2001–02 record: 36–28–13–5
- Home record: 18–13–6–4
- Road record: 18–15–7–1
- Goals for: 215
- Goals against: 213

Team information
- General manager: Bob Gainey (Oct.–Jan.); Doug Armstrong (Jan.–Apr.)
- Coach: Ken Hitchcock (Oct.–Jan.); Rick Wilson (Jan.–Apr.)
- Captain: Derian Hatcher
- Alternate captains: Mike Modano; Joe Nieuwendyk (Oct.–Mar.); Sergei Zubov
- Arena: American Airlines Center
- Average attendance: 18,532
- Minor league affiliate: Utah Grizzlies

Team leaders
- Goals: Mike Modano (34)
- Assists: Mike Modano (43)
- Points: Mike Modano (77)
- Penalty minutes: Brenden Morrow (109)
- Plus/minus: Jere Lehtinen (+27)
- Wins: Ed Belfour (21)
- Goals against average: Marty Turco (2.09)

The 2001–02 Dallas Stars season was the Stars' 9th season as the Dallas Stars and the 35th overall of the franchise. It was the Stars' first season playing home games at the American Airlines Center, and they went 18–13–6–4 in their new home stadium. However, they did not follow up their success from the previous year, only picking up 90 points for 36 wins against 28 losses for 4th place in the division and 10th in the Conference. They missed the playoffs for the first time since the 1995–96 season.

== Regular season ==
On December 3, it was announced Bob Gainey would step down as general manager and move into a consultant role at the end of the season and be replaced by assistant general manager Doug Armstrong. With a record of 23–17–6–4 after 50 games, head coach Ken Hitchcock was fired on January 25 and replaced on an interim basis by Rick Wilson. Gainey also decided to transfer general manager duties to Armstrong at that point.

- December 26, 2001: In a 2-0 shutout over the Dallas Stars, Patrick Roy became the first goalie to win 500 games in a career.

=== Final standings ===
Pacific Division
No.	CR		GP	W	L	T	OTL	GF	GA	Pts
1	3	**San Jose Sharks**	82	44	27	8	3	248	189	99
2	6	**Phoenix Coyotes**	82	40	27	9	6	228	210	95
3	7	**Los Angeles Kings**	82	40	27	11	4	214	190	95
4	10	Dallas Stars	82	36	28	13	5	215	213	90
5	13	Mighty Ducks of Anaheim	82	29	42	8	3	175	198	69

Note: CR = Conference rank; GP = Games played; W = Wins; L = Losses; T = Ties; OTL = Overtime loss; GF = Goals for; GA = Goals against; Pts = Points
Bolded teams qualified for the playoffs.

Western Conference
R		Div	GP	W	L	T	OTL	GF	GA	Pts
**1**	**p – Detroit Red Wings**	**CEN**	**82**	**51**	**17**	**10**	**4**	**251**	**187**	**116**
**2**	**y – Colorado Avalanche**	**NW**	**82**	**45**	**28**	**8**	**1**	**212**	**169**	**99**
**3**	**y – San Jose Sharks**	**PAC**	**82**	**44**	**27**	**8**	**3**	**248**	**199**	**99**
**4**	**St. Louis Blues**	**CEN**	**82**	**43**	**27**	**8**	**4**	**227**	**188**	**98**
**5**	**Chicago Blackhawks**	**CEN**	**82**	**41**	**27**	**13**	**1**	**216**	**207**	**96**
**6**	**Phoenix Coyotes**	**PAC**	**82**	**40**	**27**	**9**	**6**	**228**	**210**	**95**
**7**	**Los Angeles Kings**	**PAC**	**82**	**40**	**27**	**11**	**4**	**214**	**190**	**95**
**8**	**Vancouver Canucks**	**NW**	**82**	**42**	**30**	**7**	**3**	**254**	**211**	**94**
8.5
9	Edmonton Oilers	NW	82	38	28	12	4	205	182	92
10	Dallas Stars	PAC	82	36	28	13	5	215	213	90
11	Calgary Flames	NW	82	32	35	12	3	201	220	79
12	Minnesota Wild	NW	82	26	35	12	9	195	238	73
13	Mighty Ducks of Anaheim	PAC	82	29	42	8	3	175	198	69
14	Nashville Predators	CEN	82	28	41	13	0	196	230	69
15	Columbus Blue Jackets	CEN	82	22	47	8	5	164	255	57

Divisions: CEN – Central, PAC – Pacific, NW – Northwest

bold – Qualified for playoffs; p – Won Presidents' Trophy; y – Won division

== Schedule and results ==
2001–02 regular season
October: 4–4–2–3 (home: 3–1–1–2; road: 1–3–1–1)

Game	Date	Score	Opponent	Record	Recap
1	October 5, 2001	4–1	Nashville Predators (2001–02)	1–0–0–0	W
2	October 7, 2001	0–3	@ Carolina Hurricanes (2001–02)	1–1–0–0	L
3	October 9, 2001	2–1	Los Angeles Kings (2001–02)	2–1–0–0	W
4	October 11, 2001	1–4	Vancouver Canucks (2001–02)	2–2–0–0	L
5	October 13, 2001	3–4 OT	Calgary Flames (2001–02)	2–2–0–1	OTL
6	October 17, 2001	2–2 OT	@ St. Louis Blues (2001–02)	2–2–1–1	T
7	October 18, 2001	3–1	Phoenix Coyotes (2001–02)	3–2–1–1	W
8	October 20, 2001	2–2 OT	Chicago Blackhawks (2001–02)	3–2–2–1	T
9	October 24, 2001	2–3	@ Pittsburgh Penguins (2001–02)	3–3–2–1	L
10	October 26, 2001	5–3	@ Detroit Red Wings (2001–02)	4–3–2–1	W
11	October 28, 2001	2–3 OT	@ New York Islanders (2001–02)	4–3–2–2	OTL
12	October 29, 2001	2–4	@ New York Rangers (2001–02)	4–4–2–2	L
13	October 31, 2001	3–4 OT	Detroit Red Wings (2001–02)	4–4–2–3	OTL

November: 5–3–4–0 (home: 1–2–3–0; road: 4–1–1–0)

Game	Date	Score	Opponent	Record	Recap
14	November 2, 2001	3–0	Nashville Predators (2001–02)	5–4–2–3	W
15	November 3, 2001	1–4	@ Nashville Predators (2001–02)	5–5–2–3	L
16	November 7, 2001	2–2 OT	San Jose Sharks (2001–02)	5–5–3–3	T
17	November 9, 2001	1–5	Phoenix Coyotes (2001–02)	5–6–3–3	L
18	November 11, 2001	2–2 OT	@ Mighty Ducks of Anaheim (2001–02)	5–6–4–3	T
19	November 15, 2001	4–3	@ Los Angeles Kings (2001–02)	6–6–4–3	W
20	November 17, 2001	3–2 OT	@ San Jose Sharks (2001–02)	7–6–4–3	W
21	November 19, 2001	2–3	New York Islanders (2001–02)	7–7–4–3	L
22	November 21, 2001	4–4 OT	Carolina Hurricanes (2001–02)	7–7–5–3	T
23	November 23, 2001	3–3 OT	Philadelphia Flyers (2001–02)	7–7–6–3	T
24	November 25, 2001	4–3	@ Minnesota Wild (2001–02)	8–7–6–3	W
25	November 29, 2001	3–0	@ Calgary Flames (2001–02)	9–7–6–3	W

December: 8–5–0–1 (home: 3–4–0–1; road: 5–1–0–0)

Game	Date	Score	Opponent	Record	Recap
26	December 1, 2001	6–4	@ Edmonton Oilers (2001–02)	10–7–6–3	W
27	December 2, 2001	4–2	@ Vancouver Canucks (2001–02)	11–7–6–3	W
28	December 5, 2001	3–6	Ottawa Senators (2001–02)	11–8–6–3	L
29	December 7, 2001	5–0	Edmonton Oilers (2001–02)	12–8–6–3	W
30	December 12, 2001	4–3	Buffalo Sabres (2001–02)	13–8–6–3	W
31	December 14, 2001	3–4	Calgary Flames (2001–02)	13–9–6–3	L
32	December 15, 2001	6–2	@ Phoenix Coyotes (2001–02)	14–9–6–3	W
33	December 17, 2001	1–4	San Jose Sharks (2001–02)	14–10–6–3	L
34	December 20, 2001	1–2	@ Philadelphia Flyers (2001–02)	14–11–6–3	L
35	December 22, 2001	4–2	@ Columbus Blue Jackets (2001–02)	15–11–6–3	W
36	December 23, 2001	4–1	@ Atlanta Thrashers (2001–02)	16–11–6–3	W
37	December 26, 2001	0–2	Colorado Avalanche (2001–02)	16–12–6–3	L
38	December 28, 2001	2–3 OT	Washington Capitals (2001–02)	16–12–6–4	OTL
39	December 31, 2001	2–1	Boston Bruins (2001–02)	17–12–6–4	W

January: 7–6–0–0 (home: 3–3–0–0; road: 4–3–0–0)

Game	Date	Score	Opponent	Record	Recap
40	January 2, 2002	2–1	Atlanta Thrashers (2001–02)	18–12–6–4	W
41	January 5, 2002	2–5	@ St. Louis Blues (2001–02)	18–13–6–4	L
42	January 8, 2002	2–1	@ Tampa Bay Lightning (2001–02)	19–13–6–4	W
43	January 9, 2002	3–2	@ Florida Panthers (2001–02)	20–13–6–4	W
44	January 12, 2002	2–5	@ Detroit Red Wings (2001–02)	20–14–6–4	L
45	January 13, 2002	3–1	@ Minnesota Wild (2001–02)	21–14–6–4	W
46	January 16, 2002	3–2	Detroit Red Wings (2001–02)	22–14–6–4	W
47	January 18, 2002	2–3	Florida Panthers (2001–02)	22–15–6–4	L
48	January 20, 2002	2–3	@ Chicago Blackhawks (2001–02)	22–16–6–4	L
49	January 21, 2002	5–3	@ Columbus Blue Jackets (2001–02)	23–16–6–4	W
50	January 23, 2002	2–4	Vancouver Canucks (2001–02)	23–17–6–4	L
51	January 25, 2002	1–6	Mighty Ducks of Anaheim (2001–02)	23–18–6–4	L
52	January 28, 2002	4–2	Columbus Blue Jackets (2001–02)	24–18–6–4	W

February: 3–3–1–0 (home: 1–0–1–0; road: 2–3–0–0)

Game	Date	Score	Opponent	Record	Recap
53	February 6, 2002	1–2	@ Nashville Predators (2001–02)	24–19–6–4	L
54	February 8, 2002	1–1 OT	Edmonton Oilers (2001–02)	24–19–7–4	T
55	February 10, 2002	5–1	@ Mighty Ducks of Anaheim (2001–02)	25–19–7–4	W
56	February 11, 2002	1–2	@ Los Angeles Kings (2001–02)	25–20–7–4	L
57	February 13, 2002	4–2	New York Rangers (2001–02)	26–20–7–4	W
58	February 26, 2002	1–5	@ Phoenix Coyotes (2001–02)	26–21–7–4	L
59	February 28, 2002	4–3 OT	@ Vancouver Canucks (2001–02)	27–21–7–4	W

March: 6–5–4–0 (home: 4–3–0–0; road: 2–2–4–0)

Game	Date	Score	Opponent	Record	Recap
60	March 2, 2002	2–1	@ Colorado Avalanche (2001–02)	28–21–7–4	W
61	March 3, 2002	4–1	San Jose Sharks (2001–02)	29–21–7–4	W
62	March 6, 2002	3–2 OT	Los Angeles Kings (2001–02)	30–21–7–4	W
63	March 8, 2002	3–5	Minnesota Wild (2001–02)	30–22–7–4	L
64	March 10, 2002	0–3	New Jersey Devils (2001–02)	30–23–7–4	L
65	March 12, 2002	5–2	@ Washington Capitals (2001–02)	31–23–7–4	W
66	March 14, 2002	3–3 OT	@ Montreal Canadiens (2001–02)	31–23–8–4	T
67	March 16, 2002	5–5 OT	@ Toronto Maple Leafs (2001–02)	31–23–9–4	T
68	March 18, 2002	2–2 OT	@ Chicago Blackhawks (2001–02)	31–23–10–4	T
69	March 20, 2002	3–2	St. Louis Blues (2001–02)	32–23–10–4	W
70	March 22, 2002	4–3	Phoenix Coyotes (2001–02)	33–23–10–4	W
71	March 24, 2002	1–2	Mighty Ducks of Anaheim (2001–02)	33–24–10–4	L
72	March 26, 2002	2–3	@ San Jose Sharks (2001–02)	33–25–10–4	L
73	March 28, 2002	2–2 OT	@ Calgary Flames (2001–02)	33–25–11–4	T
74	March 30, 2002	1–3	@ Edmonton Oilers (2001–02)	33–26–11–4	L

April: 3–2–2–1 (home: 3–0–1–1; road: 0–2–1–0)

Game	Date	Score	Opponent	Record	Recap
75	April 1, 2002	3–1	Columbus Blue Jackets (2001–02)	34–26–11–4	W
76	April 3, 2002	1–2 OT	St. Louis Blues (2001–02)	34–26–11–5	OTL
77	April 5, 2002	3–1	Colorado Avalanche (2001–02)	35–26–11–5	W
78	April 7, 2002	1–4	@ Mighty Ducks of Anaheim (2001–02)	35–27–11–5	L
79	April 8, 2002	0–3	@ Los Angeles Kings (2001–02)	35–28–11–5	L
80	April 10, 2002	4–4 OT	Minnesota Wild (2001–02)	35–28–12–5	T
81	April 12, 2002	3–1	Chicago Blackhawks (2001–02)	36–28–12–5	W
82	April 14, 2002	2–2 OT	@ Colorado Avalanche (2001–02)	36–28–13–5	T

Legend: W Win (2 points) L Loss (0 points) T Tie (1 point) OTL Overtime loss (1 point)

== Player statistics ==
=== Scoring ===
- Position abbreviations: C = Center; D = Defense; G = Goaltender; LW = Left wing; RW = Right wing
- † = Joined team via a transaction (e.g., trade, waivers, signing) during the season. Stats reflect time with the Stars only.
- ‡ = Left team via a transaction (e.g., trade, waivers, release) during the season. Stats reflect time with the Stars only.

No.	Player	Pos	Regular season					
No.	Player	Pos	GP	G	A	Pts	+/-	PIM
9	Mike Modano	C	78	34	43	77	14	38
26	Jere Lehtinen	RW	73	25	24	49	27	14
25	Joe Nieuwendyk‡	C	67	23	24	47	−2	18
77	Pierre Turgeon	C	66	15	32	47	−4	16
56	Sergei Zubov	D	80	12	32	44	−4	22
10	Brenden Morrow	LW	72	17	18	35	12	109
5	Darryl Sydor	D	78	4	29	33	3	50
22	Kirk Muller	LW	78	10	20	30	−12	28
15	Jamie Langenbrunner‡	RW	68	10	16	26	−11	54
2	Derian Hatcher	D	80	4	21	25	12	87
24	Richard Matvichuk	D	82	9	12	21	11	52
16	Pat Verbeek	RW	64	7	13	20	−4	72
23	Martin Rucinsky†‡	LW	42	6	11	17	3	24
17	Benoit Brunet†‡	LW	32	4	9	13	5	8
18	Rob DiMaio	RW	61	6	6	12	−2	25
28	Donald Audette‡	RW	20	4	8	12	2	12
13	Valeri Kamensky‡	LW	24	3	6	9	3	2
33	Scott Pellerin†	LW	33	3	5	8	−5	15
41	Brent Gilchrist†	LW	26	2	5	7	−6	6
37	Brad Lukowich	D	66	1	6	7	−1	40
33	Benoit Hogue‡	C	32	3	3	6	−4	24
51	John MacLean†	RW	20	3	3	6	−1	17
27	Shaun Van Allen‡	C	19	2	4	6	−5	6
12	Randy McKay†	RW	14	1	4	5	2	7
20	Ed Belfour	G	60	0	5	5		12
44	Jason Arnott†	C	10	3	1	4	−1	6
14	Jon Sim	LW	26	3	0	3	−3	10
32	Jim Montgomery	C	8	0	2	2	−1	0
27	Manny Malhotra†	C	16	1	0	1	−3	5
3	John Erskine	D	33	0	1	1	−8	62
43	Steve Gainey	LW	5	0	1	1	−1	7
39	Niko Kapanen	C	9	0	1	1	−1	2
23	Jyrki Lumme‡	D	15	0	1	1	−5	4
4	Dave Manson†	D	34	0	1	1	−1	23
28	Greg Hawgood	D	2	0	0	0	0	2
6	Sami Helenius	D	39	0	0	0	−4	58
36	Roman Lyashenko‡	C	4	0	0	0	−2	0
35	Marty Turco	G	31	0	0	0		10

=== Goaltending ===
No.	Player	Regular season									
No.	Player	GP	W	L	T	SA	GA	GAA	SV%	SO	TOI
20	Ed Belfour	60	21	27	11	1458	153	2.65	.895	1	3467
35	Marty Turco	31	15	6	2	670	53	2.09	.921	2	1519

== Awards and records ==
=== Awards ===
Type	Award/honor	Recipient	Ref
League (in-season)	NHL All-Star Game selection	Jere Lehtinen (Note: Lehtinen did not play and was replaced by Espen Knutsen of the Columbus Blue Jackets.)	
League (in-season)	NHL Player of the Week	Mike Modano (January 14)	
League (in-season)	NHL Player of the Week	Marty Turco (March 4)	
League (in-season)	NHL YoungStars Game selection	Brenden Morrow	
Team	Star of the Game Award	Mike Modano	

=== Milestones ===
Milestone	Player	Date	Ref
First game	Niko Kapanen	October 9, 2001	
First game	John Erskine	November 19, 2001	
400th goal scored	Mike Modano	January 2, 2002	
1,000th game played	Joe Nieuwendyk	January 20, 2002	

== Transactions ==
The Stars were involved in the following transactions from June 10, 2001, the day after the deciding game of the 2001 Stanley Cup Final, through June 13, 2002, the day of the deciding game of the 2002 Stanley Cup Final.

=== Trades ===
Date	Details		Ref
June 23, 2001	To Dallas Stars: Jyrki Lumme	To Phoenix Coyotes: Tyler Bouck	
June 24, 2001	To Dallas Stars: Cameron Mann	To Boston Bruins: Ric Jackman	
August 29, 2001	To Dallas Stars: 2nd-round pick in 2003	To Columbus Blue Jackets: Grant Marshall	
September 28, 2001	To Dallas Stars: Kirk Muller	To Columbus Blue Jackets: Rights to Evgeny Petrochinin	
November 21, 2001	To Dallas Stars: Benoit Brunet; Martin Rucinsky	To Montreal Canadiens: Donald Audette; Shaun Van Allen	
November 21, 2001	To Dallas Stars: Dave Manson	To Toronto Maple Leafs: Jyrki Lumme	
January 12, 2002	To Dallas Stars: Future considerations	To Boston Bruins: Benoit Hogue	
January 16, 2002	To Dallas Stars: Andre Lakos; Future considerations	To New Jersey Devils: Valeri Kamensky	
March 12, 2002	To Dallas Stars: Barrett Heisten; Manny Malhotra	To New York Rangers: Roman Lyashenko; Martin Rucinsky	
March 16, 2002	To Dallas Stars: Conditional draft pick in 2003 (Note: 6th-round pick.)	To Ottawa Senators: Benoit Brunet	
March 19, 2002	To Dallas Stars: Jason Arnott; Randy McKay; 1st-round pick in 2002	To New Jersey Devils: Jamie Langenbrunner; Joe Nieuwendyk	
June 12, 2002	To Dallas Stars: Philadelphia’s 1st-round pick in 2002; 2nd-round pick in 2002; 6th-round pick in 2003	To Washington Capitals: 1st-round pick in 2002	

=== Players acquired ===
Date	Player	Former team	Term	Via	Ref
July 1, 2001	Rob DiMaio	Carolina Hurricanes	3-year	Free agency	
July 1, 2001	Pierre Turgeon	St. Louis Blues	5-year	Free agency	
July 2, 2001	Donald Audette	Buffalo Sabres	4-year	Free agency	
July 5, 2001	Valeri Kamensky	New York Rangers	1-year (Note: Option for a second year.)	Free agency	
July 10, 2001	Jim Montgomery	San Jose Sharks	1-year	Free agency	
July 17, 2001	Greg Hawgood	Vancouver Canucks	2-year	Free agency	
July 17, 2001	Gavin Morgan	Utah Grizzlies (IHL)	1-year	Free agency	
August 31, 2001	Pat Verbeek	Detroit Red Wings	1-year	Free agency	
January 12, 2002	Scott Pellerin	Boston Bruins		Waivers	
February 13, 2002	Brent Gilchrist	Detroit Red Wings		Waivers	
February 26, 2002	John MacLean	Utah Grizzlies (AHL)	1-year	Free agency	

=== Players lost ===
Date	Player	New team	Via (Note: In parentheses is the player's free agency group on July 1 if applicable.)	Ref
N/A	Jeff Tory	Kassel Huskies (DEL)	Free agency (UFA)	
N/A	Yevgeni Tsybuk	Avangard Omsk (RSL)	Free agency (UFA)	
July 5, 2001	Mike Keane	St. Louis Blues	Free agency (III)	
July 10, 2001	David Ling	Columbus Blue Jackets	Free agency (VI)	
July 13, 2001	Grant Ledyard	Tampa Bay Lightning	Free agency (III)	
July 17, 2001	Greg Leeb	Edmonton Oilers	Free agency (UFA)	
July 25, 2001	Jimmy Roy	Manitoba Moose (AHL)	Free agency (UFA)	
August 2, 2001	Ryan Christie	Calgary Flames	Free agency (UFA)	
August 2, 2001	Jamie Wright	Calgary Flames	Free agency (VI)	
August 7, 2001	Mike Bales	Belfast Giants (BISL)	Free agency (VI)	
August 18, 2001	Eric Houde	HC Asiago (Serie A)	Free agency (UFA)	
August 22, 2001	Brett Hull	Detroit Red Wings	Free agency (III)	
August 22, 2001	Alan Letang	Calgary Flames	Free agency (VI)	
N/A	Chris Wells	Wilkes-Barre/Scranton Penguins (AHL)	Free agency (UFA)	
September 28, 2001	Kirk Muller	Columbus Blue Jackets	Waiver draft	
November 23, 2001	Ted Donato	Manchester Monarchs (AHL)	Free agency (III)	
February 15, 2002	John MacLean	Utah Grizzlies (AHL)	Free agency (III)	
June 7, 2002	John MacLean		Retirement	

=== Signings ===
Date	Player	Term	Contract type	Ref
June 13, 2001	Sami Helenius	1-year	Re-signing	
June 30, 2001	Kirk Muller	1-year	Re-signing	
July 10, 2001	Niko Kapanen	2-year	Entry-level	
July 10, 2001	Marcus Kristoffersson	2-year	Entry-level	
July 17, 2001	Jon Sim	1-year	Re-signing	
July 18, 2001	Cameron Mann	1-year	Re-signing	
July 24, 2001	Brad Lukowich	2-year	Re-signing	
July 25, 2001	Jason Bacashihua	3-year	Entry-level	
July 25, 2001	Steve Ott	3-year	Entry-level	
July 31, 2001	Jamie Langenbrunner	1-year	Re-signing	
August 14, 2001	Chad Alban	1-year	Re-signing	
February 5, 2002	Darryl Sydor	5-year	Extension	
April 23, 2002	Mark Wotton	2-year	Extension	
June 12, 2002	Kirk Muller	1-year	Extension	

== Draft picks ==
Dallas's draft picks at the 2001 NHL entry draft held at the National Car Rental Center in Sunrise, Florida.

Round	#	Player	Nationality	College/Junior/Club team (League)
1	26	Jason Bacashihua	United States	Chicago Freeze (NAHL)
3	70	Yared Hagos	Sweden	AIK IF (Sweden)
3	92	Anthony Aquino	Canada	Merrimack College (Hockey East)
4	126	Daniel Volrab	Czech Republic	Sparta Prague (Czech Republic)
5	161	Mike Smith	Canada	Sudbury Wolves (OHL)
6	167	Michal Blazek	Czech Republic	Vsetín HC (Czech Republic)
6	192	Jussi Jokinen	Finland	Oulun Kärpät Jr. (Finland)
8	255	Marco Rosa	Canada	Merrimack College (NCAA)
9	265	Dale Sullivan	Canada	Hull Olympiques (QMJHL)
9	285	Marek Tomica	Czech Republic	Slavia Prague (Czech Republic)

== See also ==
- 2001–02 NHL season
