= 2001–02 San Jose Sharks season =

National Hockey League team season

2001–02 San Jose Sharks
- Pacific Division champions
- Division: 1st Pacific
- Conference: 3rd Western
- 2001–02 record: 44–27–8–3
- Home record: 25–11–3–2
- Road record: 19–16–5–1
- Goals for: 248
- Goals against: 199

Team information
- General manager: Dean Lombardi
- Coach: Darryl Sutter
- Captain: Owen Nolan
- Alternate captains: Vincent Damphousse; Mike Ricci
- Arena: HP Pavilion
- Average attendance: 17,422
- Minor league affiliates: Cleveland Barons; Richmond Renegades

Team leaders
- Goals: Teemu Selanne (29)
- Assists: Owen Nolan (43)
- Points: Owen Nolan (66)
- Penalty minutes: Bryan Marchment (178)
- Plus/minus: Mike Rathje (+23); Marco Sturm (+23)
- Wins: Evgeni Nabokov (37)
- Goals against average: Evgeni Nabokov (2.29)

The 2001–02 San Jose Sharks season was the club's 11th season of operation in the National Hockey League (NHL). The Sharks once again set franchise records for points (99) and wins (44) in a season. Most notably, the team won the Pacific Division for the first time in franchise history. Consequently, the Sharks clinched a playoff berth for the fifth consecutive season.

In Darryl Sutter's fifth year as head coach, the Sharks took a massive step forward. For the first time, the team boasted offensive depth in spades, as six forwards (Owen Nolan, Teemu Selanne, Patrick Marleau, Marco Sturm, Scott Thornton and Vincent Damphousse) finished the season with at least 20 goals, while another two (Mike Ricci and Adam Graves) finished with at least 17. While the Sharks' defense nominally regressed from one year earlier, it remained one of the Western Conference's top units; the play of Brad Stuart, Bryan Marchment, Gary Suter and Mike Rathje proved more than adequate during the regular season. The Sharks also benefited from the strong goaltending of starter Evgeni Nabokov and backup Miikka Kiprusoff. Regular season highlights included a 10–2 victory over the Columbus Blue Jackets (March 30, 2002) and Patrick Marleau's first career hat trick (April 6, 2002). Evgeni Nabokov also became the first goaltender in franchise history (and seventh in NHL history) to score a goal with an empty-net tally against the Vancouver Canucks on March 10. On April 12, the Sharks clinched the Pacific Division title following a Los Angeles Kings loss to the Canucks. In winning the division, the Sharks also clinched home-ice advantage in a playoff series for the first time in franchise history.

In the first round of the 2002 Stanley Cup playoffs, the third-seeded Sharks faced the sixth-seeded Phoenix Coyotes. The teams split the first two games in San Jose. From there, however, the Sharks closed the series out with a trio of convincing victories. In the second round, the team faced eventual Hall of Fame goaltender Patrick Roy and the defending champion Colorado Avalanche. The Sharks took successive series leads of 1–0, 2–1 and 3–2 against the favored Avalanche. However, each time Colorado managed to re-tie the series. In Game 6, which was briefly interrupted by a magnitude 5.2 earthquake, the Sharks took the Avalanche to overtime. However, a goal by Peter Forsberg forced a deciding seventh game in Denver. There, the Avalanche eliminated the Sharks with a hard-fought 1–0 victory. The game is arguably best remembered (amongst Sharks fans) for Teemu Selanne missing an open net from close range in the first period.

== Regular season ==
On March 10, 2002, Evgeni Nabokov became the first netminder in NHL history to score a powerplay goal, doing so against the Vancouver Canucks. He was also the first European goaltender to score a goal.

On March 30, 2002, the Sharks defeated the Columbus Blue Jackets at home 10–2. It was the second time in the 2001–02 NHL regular season that a team had scored ten goals in a single game, as the Ottawa Senators had defeated the Washington Capitals on the road 11–5. Further, it was the first time the Sharks had scored ten goals in a regular season game since January 13, 1996, when they defeated the Pittsburgh Penguins on the road 10–8.

=== Final standings ===
Pacific Division
No.	CR		GP	W	L	T	OTL	GF	GA	Pts
1	3	**San Jose Sharks**	82	44	27	8	3	248	189	99
2	6	**Phoenix Coyotes**	82	40	27	9	6	228	210	95
3	7	**Los Angeles Kings**	82	40	27	11	4	214	190	95
4	10	Dallas Stars	82	36	28	13	5	215	213	90
5	13	Mighty Ducks of Anaheim	82	29	42	8	3	175	198	69

Note: CR = Conference rank; GP = Games played; W = Wins; L = Losses; T = Ties; OTL = Overtime loss; GF = Goals for; GA = Goals against; Pts = Points
Bolded teams qualified for the playoffs.

Western Conference
R		Div	GP	W	L	T	OTL	GF	GA	Pts
**1**	**p – Detroit Red Wings**	**CEN**	**82**	**51**	**17**	**10**	**4**	**251**	**187**	**116**
**2**	**y – Colorado Avalanche**	**NW**	**82**	**45**	**28**	**8**	**1**	**212**	**169**	**99**
**3**	**y – San Jose Sharks**	**PAC**	**82**	**44**	**27**	**8**	**3**	**248**	**199**	**99**
**4**	**St. Louis Blues**	**CEN**	**82**	**43**	**27**	**8**	**4**	**227**	**188**	**98**
**5**	**Chicago Blackhawks**	**CEN**	**82**	**41**	**27**	**13**	**1**	**216**	**207**	**96**
**6**	**Phoenix Coyotes**	**PAC**	**82**	**40**	**27**	**9**	**6**	**228**	**210**	**95**
**7**	**Los Angeles Kings**	**PAC**	**82**	**40**	**27**	**11**	**4**	**214**	**190**	**95**
**8**	**Vancouver Canucks**	**NW**	**82**	**42**	**30**	**7**	**3**	**254**	**211**	**94**
8.5
9	Edmonton Oilers	NW	82	38	28	12	4	205	182	92
10	Dallas Stars	PAC	82	36	28	13	5	215	213	90
11	Calgary Flames	NW	82	32	35	12	3	201	220	79
12	Minnesota Wild	NW	82	26	35	12	9	195	238	73
13	Mighty Ducks of Anaheim	PAC	82	29	42	8	3	175	198	69
14	Nashville Predators	CEN	82	28	41	13	0	196	230	69
15	Columbus Blue Jackets	CEN	82	22	47	8	5	164	255	57

Divisions: CEN – Central, PAC – Pacific, NW – Northwest

bold – Qualified for playoffs; p – Won Presidents' Trophy; y – Won division

== Schedule and results ==
=== Regular season ===
2001–02 regular season
October: 5–3–3–1 (home: 3–0–1–1; road: 2–3–2–0)

Game	Date	Score	Opponent	Decision	Record	Recap
1	October 4, 2001	3–4 OT	Detroit Red Wings (2001–02)	Nabokov	0–0–0–1	OTL
2	October 6, 2001	0–0 OT	Minnesota Wild (2001–02)	Nabokov	0–0–1–1	T
3	October 11, 2001	4–3	Tampa Bay Lightning (2001–02)	Nabokov	1–0–1–1	W
4	October 13, 2001	3–2	Boston Bruins (2001–02)	Kiprusoff	2–0–1–1	W
5	October 16, 2001	3–3 OT	@ Minnesota Wild(2001–02)	Nabokov	2–0–2–1	T
6	October 18, 2001	1–6	@ New Jersey Devils (2001–02)	Nabokov	2–1–2–1	L
7	October 20, 2001	2–2 OT	@ New York Islanders (2001–02)	Kiprusoff	2–1–3–1	T
8	October 22, 2001	5–1	@ New York Rangers (2001–02)	Nabokov	3–1–3–1	W
9	October 23, 2001	1–4	@ Buffalo Sabres (2001–02)	Kiprusoff	3–2–3–1	L
10	October 25, 2001	2–4	@ Chicago Blackhawks (2001–02)	Nabokov	3–3–3–1	L
11	October 27, 2001	2–0	Columbus Blue Jackets (2001–02)	Nabokov	4–3–3–1	W
12	October 31, 2001	4–2	@ Mighty Ducks of Anaheim (2001–02)	Nabokov	5–3–3–1	W

November: 7–4–1–2 (home: 4–1–0–1; road: 3–3–1–1)

Game	Date	Score	Opponent	Decision	Record	Recap
13	November 1, 2001	5–2	Atlanta Thrashers (2001–02)	Nabokov	6–3–3–1	W
14	November 3, 2001	5–1	Vancouver Canucks (2001–02)	Nabokov	7–3–3–1	W
15	November 6, 2001	4–1	@ St. Louis Blues (2001–02)	Nabokov	8–3–3–1	W
16	November 7, 2001	2–2 OT	@ Dallas Stars (2001–02)	Nabokov	8–3–4–1	T
17	November 9, 2001	2–3	@ Carolina Hurricanes (2001–02)	Nabokov	8–4–4–1	L
18	November 11, 2001	2–3 OT	@ Chicago Blackhawks (2001–02)	Nabokov	8–4–4–2	OTL
19	November 14, 2001	4–2	@ Mighty Ducks of Anaheim (2001–02)	Nabokov	9–4–4–2	W
20	November 15, 2001	3–5	@ Phoenix Coyotes (2001–02)	Kiprusoff	9–5–4–2	L
21	November 17, 2001	2–3 OT	Dallas Stars (2001–02)	Nabokov	9–5–4–3	OTL
22	November 21, 2001	0–2	Minnesota Wild (2001–02)	Nabokov	9–6–4–3	L
23	November 24, 2001	1–3	@ Los Angeles Kings (2001–02)	Nabokov	9–7–4–3	L
24	November 27, 2001	3–2	Nashville Predators (2001–02)	Nabokov	10–7–4–3	W
25	November 29, 2001	5–0	Pittsburgh Penguins (2001–02)	Nabokov	11–7–4–3	W
26	November 30, 2001	5–2	@ Mighty Ducks of Anaheim (2001–02)	Nabokov	12–7–4–3	W

December: 6–4–2–0 (home: 1–3–1–0; road: 5–1–1–0)

Game	Date	Score	Opponent	Decision	Record	Recap
27	December 4, 2001	2–2 OT	Calgary Flames (2001–02)	Nabokov	12–7–5–3	T
28	December 6, 2001	3–1	@ Calgary Flames (2001–02)	Nabokov	13–7–5–3	W
29	December 8, 2001	5–3	@ Vancouver Canucks (2001–02)	Kiprusoff	14–7–5–3	W
30	December 11, 2001	5–4 OT	Edmonton Oilers (2001–02)	Nabokov	15–7–5–3	W
31	December 14, 2001	3–0	@ Colorado Avalanche (2001–02)	Nabokov	16–7–5–3	W
32	December 17, 2001	4–1	@ Dallas Stars (2001–02)	Nabokov	17–7–5–3	W
33	December 19, 2001	4–2	@ Atlanta Thrashers (2001–02)	Nabokov	18–7–5–3	W
34	December 21, 2001	0–3	@ Detroit Red Wings (2001–02)	Nabokov	18–8–5–3	L
35	December 23, 2001	1–1 OT	@ Nashville Predators (2001–02)	Nabokov	18–8–6–3	T
36	December 26, 2001	1–2	Mighty Ducks of Anaheim (2001–02)	Nabokov	18–9–6–3	L
37	December 28, 2001	3–5	New York Rangers (2001–02)	Nabokov	18–10–6–3	L
38	December 30, 2001	2–4	Phoenix Coyotes (2001–02)	Nabokov	18–11–6–3	L

January: 8–6–1–0 (home: 5–3–0–0; road: 3–3–1–0)

Game	Date	Score	Opponent	Decision	Record	Recap
39	January 2, 2002	5–2	Philadelphia Flyers (2001–02)	Kiprusoff	19–11–6–3	W
40	January 4, 2002	5–3	Phoenix Coyotes (2001–02)	Kiprusoff	20–11–6–3	W
41	January 5, 2002	6–0	Florida Panthers (2001–02)	Kiprusoff	21–11–6–3	W
42	January 8, 2002	2–6	St. Louis Blues (2001–02)	Nabokov	21–12–6–3	L
43	January 9, 2002	6–5	@ Phoenix Coyotes (2001–02)	Nabokov	22–12–6–3	W
44	January 12, 2002	2–3	Los Angeles Kings (2001–02)	Kiprusoff	22–13–6–3	L
45	January 15, 2002	1–0 OT	@ Colorado Avalanche (2001–02)	Nabokov	23–13–6–3	W
46	January 17, 2002	3–2	New York Islanders (2001–02)	Nabokov	24–13–6–3	W
47	January 19, 2002	1–3	Colorado Avalanche (2001–02)	Nabokov	24–14–6–3	L
48	January 21, 2002	4–3	Edmonton Oilers (2001–02)	Nabokov	25–14–6–3	W
49	January 23, 2002	2–2 OT	@ Detroit Red Wings (2001–02)	Kiprusoff	25–14–7–3	T
50	January 24, 2002	2–6	@ Columbus Blue Jackets (2001–02)	Nabokov	25–15–7–3	L
51	January 27, 2002	1–3	@ Montreal Canadiens (2001–02)	Nabokov	25–16–7–3	L
52	January 29, 2002	3–4	@ Toronto Maple Leafs (2001–02)	Kiprusoff	25–17–7–3	L
53	January 30, 2002	6–3	@ Pittsburgh Penguins (2001–02)	Nabokov	26–17–7–3	W

February: 6–0–0–0 (home: 3–0–0–0; road: 3–0–0–0)

Game	Date	Score	Opponent	Decision	Record	Recap
54	February 6, 2002	2–0	Calgary Flames (2001–02)	Nabokov	27–17–7–3	W
55	February 8, 2002	4–2	Chicago Blackhawks (2001–02)	Nabokov	28–17–7–3	W
56	February 10, 2002	4–0	Carolina Hurricanes (2001–02)	Nabokov	29–17–7–3	W
57	February 12, 2002	3–2	@ Edmonton Oilers (2001–02)	Nabokov	30–17–7–3	W
58	February 26, 2002	5–1	@ Nashville Predators (2001–02)	Nabokov	31–17–7–3	W
59	February 28, 2002	5–2	@ Washington Capitals (2001–02)	Nabokov	32–17–7–3	W

March: 7–8–1–0 (home: 5–4–1–0; road: 2–4–0–0)

Game	Date	Score	Opponent	Decision	Record	Recap
60	March 1, 2002	2–4	@ Tampa Bay Lightning (2001–02)	Kiprusoff	32–18–7–3	L
61	March 3, 2002	1–4	@ Dallas Stars (2001–02)	Nabokov	32–19–7–3	L
62	March 5, 2002	0–2	Nashville Predators (2001–02)	Nabokov	32–20–7–3	L
63	March 7, 2002	5–2	Ottawa Senators (2001–02)	Nabokov	33–20–7–3	W
64	March 9, 2002	2–0	Vancouver Canucks (2001–02)	Kiprusoff	34–20–7–3	W
65	March 10, 2002	7–4	@ Vancouver Canucks (2001–02)	Nabokov	35–20–7–3	W
66	March 13, 2002	0–2	St. Louis Blues (2001–02)	Nabokov	35–21–7–3	L
67	March 15, 2002	5–4	Washington Capitals (2001–02)	Nabokov	36–21–7–3	W
68	March 16, 2002	2–2 OT	Chicago Blackhawks (2001–02)	Kiprusoff	36–21–8–3	T
69	March 18, 2002	2–3	Los Angeles Kings (2001–02)	Nabokov	36–22–8–3	L
70	March 20, 2002	1–2	@ Edmonton Oilers (2001–02)	Nabokov	36–23–8–3	L
71	March 21, 2002	4–1	@ Calgary Flames (2001–02)	Nabokov	37–23–8–3	W
72	March 23, 2002	0–3	@ Los Angeles Kings (2001–02)	Nabokov	37–24–8–3	L
73	March 26, 2002	3–2	Dallas Stars (2001–02)	Nabokov	38–24–8–3	W
74	March 28, 2002	2–3	Colorado Avalanche (2001–02)	Nabokov	38–25–8–3	L
75	March 30, 2002	10–2	Columbus Blue Jackets (2001–02)	Kiprusoff	39–25–8–3	W

April: 5–2–0–0 (home: 4–0–0–0; road: 1–2–0–0)

Game	Date	Score	Opponent	Decision	Record	Recap
76	April 2, 2002	3–1	Mighty Ducks of Anaheim (2001–02)	Nabokov	40–25–8–3	W
77	April 4, 2002	5–2	Phoenix Coyotes (2001–02)	Nabokov	41–25–8–3	W
78	April 6, 2002	6–3	Detroit Red Wings (2001–02)	Nabokov	42–25–8–3	W
79	April 8, 2002	1–3	@ Minnesota Wild (2001–02)	Nabokov	42–26–8–3	L
80	April 10, 2002	5–3	@ Columbus Blue Jackets (2001–02)	Nabokov	43–26–8–3	W
81	April 11, 2002	1–4	@ St. Louis Blues (2001–02)	Kiprusoff	43–27–8–3	L
82	April 13, 2002	3–1	Los Angeles Kings (2001–02)	Nabokov	44–27–8–3	W

Legend: W Win (2 points) L Loss (0 points) T Tie (1 point) OTL Overtime loss (1 point)

=== Playoffs ===
2002 Stanley Cup playoffs
Western Conference Quarterfinals vs. (6) Phoenix Coyotes – Sharks win 4–1

Game	Date	Score	Opponent	Series	Recap
1	April 17, 2002	2–1	Phoenix Coyotes	Sharks lead 1–0	W
2	April 20, 2002	1–3	Phoenix Coyotes	Series tied 1–1	L
3	April 22, 2002	4–1	@ Phoenix Coyotes	Sharks lead 2–1	W
4	April 24, 2002	2–1	@ Phoenix Coyotes	Sharks lead 3–1	W
5	April 26, 2002	4–1	Phoenix Coyotes	Sharks win 4–1	W

Western Conference Semifinals vs. (2) Colorado Avalanche – Avalanche win 4–3

Game	Date	Score	Opponent	Series	Recap
1	May 1, 2002	6–3	@ Colorado Avalanche	Sharks lead 1–0	W
2	May 4, 2002	2–8	@ Colorado Avalanche	Series tied 1–1	L
3	May 6, 2002	6–4	Colorado Avalanche	Sharks lead 2–1	W
4	May 8, 2002	1–4	Colorado Avalanche	Series tied 2–2	L
5	May 11, 2002	5–3	@ Colorado Avalanche	Sharks lead 3–2	W
6	May 13, 2002	1–2 OT	Colorado Avalanche	Series tied 3–3	L
7	May 15, 2002	0–1	@ Colorado Avalanche	Avalanche win 4–3	L

Legend: W Win L Loss

== Player statistics ==
=== Scoring ===
- Position abbreviations: C = Center; D = Defense; G = Goaltender; LW = Left wing; RW = Right wing

No.	Player	Pos	Regular season						Playoffs					
No.	Player	Pos	GP	G	A	Pts	+/-	PIM	GP	G	A	Pts	+/-	PIM
11	Owen Nolan	RW	75	23	43	66	7	93	12	3	6	9	−2	8
25	Vincent Damphousse	C	82	20	38	58	8	60	12	2	6	8	−1	12
8	Teemu Selanne	RW	82	29	25	54	−11	40	12	5	3	8	−3	2
18	Mike Ricci	C	79	19	34	53	9	44	12	4	6	10	6	4
12	Patrick Marleau	C	79	21	23	44	9	40	12	6	5	11	3	6
17	Scott Thornton	LW	77	26	16	42	11	116	12	3	3	6	3	6
19	Marco Sturm	LW	77	21	20	41	23	32	12	3	2	5	−1	2
24	Niklas Sundstrom	RW	73	9	30	39	7	50	12	1	6	7	3	6
20	Gary Suter	D	82	6	27	33	13	57	12	0	4	4	2	8
9	Adam Graves	LW	81	17	14	31	11	51	12	3	1	4	−2	6
7	Brad Stuart	D	82	6	23	29	13	39	12	0	3	3	1	8
28	Matt Bradley	RW	54	9	13	22	22	43	10	0	0	0	0	0
13	Todd Harvey	RW	69	9	13	22	16	73	12	0	2	2	3	12
27	Bryan Marchment	D	72	2	20	22	22	178	12	1	1	2	−1	10
10	Marcus Ragnarsson	D	70	5	15	20	4	44	12	1	3	4	−1	12
5	Jeff Jillson	D	48	5	13	18	2	29	4	0	0	0	0	0
2	Mike Rathje	D	52	5	12	17	23	48	12	1	3	4	5	6
22	Scott Hannan	D	75	2	12	14	10	57	12	0	2	2	−1	12
32	Stephane Matteau	LW	55	7	4	11	4	15	10	1	2	3	1	2
15	Alexander Korolyuk	LW	32	3	7	10	2	14	—	—	—	—	—	—
16	Mark Smith	C	49	3	3	6	−1	72	—	—	—	—	—	—
35	Evgeni Nabokov	G	67	1	3	4		14	12	0	2	2		2
23	Shawn Heins	D	17	0	2	2	1	24	—	—	—	—	—	—
3	Steve Bancroft	D	5	0	1	1	−2	2	—	—	—	—	—	—
26	Mike Craig	RW	2	0	0	0	0	2	—	—	—	—	—	—
50	Hannes Hyvonen	RW	6	0	0	0	−2	0	—	—	—	—	—	—
37	Miikka Kiprusoff	G	20	0	0	0		4	1	0	0	0		0
29	Vesa Toskala	G	1	0	0	0		0	—	—	—	—	—	—

=== Goaltending ===
No.	Player	Regular season										Playoffs								
No.	Player	GP	W	L	T	SA	GA	GAA	SV%	SO	TOI	GP	W	L	SA	GA	GAA	SV%	SO	TOI
35	Evgeni Nabokov	67	37	24	5	1818	149	2.29	.918	7	3901	12	7	5	322	31	2.61	.904	0	712
37	Miikka Kiprusoff	20	7	6	3	508	43	2.49	.915	2	1037	1	0	0	2	0	0.00	1.000	0	8
29	Vesa Toskala	1	0	0	0	2	0	0.00	1.000	0	10	—	—	—	—	—	—	—	—	—

== Awards and records ==
=== Awards ===
Type	Award/honor	Recipient	Ref
League (in-season)	NHL All-Star Game selection	Vincent Damphousse (Note: Damphousse, Nolan, and Selanne were voted to the starting lineup.)	
League (in-season)	NHL All-Star Game selection	Owen Nolan	
League (in-season)	NHL All-Star Game selection	Teemu Selanne	
League (in-season)	NHL Player of the Month	Evgeni Nabokov (February)	
League (in-season)	NHL Player of the Week	Evgeni Nabokov (February 11)	
Team	Sharks Player of the Year	Mike Ricci	
Team	Sharks Rookie of the Year	Matt Bradley	

=== Milestones ===
Milestone	Player	Date	Ref
First game	Jeff Jillson	October 4, 2001	
First game	Vesa Toskala	November 24, 2001	
First game	Hannes Hyvonen	March 23, 2002	
1,000th game played	Adam Graves	October 27, 2001	
400th goal	Teemu Selanne	March 7, 2002	

== Transactions ==
The Sharks were involved in the following transactions from June 10, 2001, the day after the deciding game of the 2001 Stanley Cup Final, through June 13, 2002, the day of the deciding game of the 2002 Stanley Cup Final.

=== Trades ===
Date	Details		Ref
June 24, 2001	To San Jose Sharks: Adam Graves (Note: The Rangers agreed to pay two-thirds of Graves’ remaining salary on his contract.)	To New York Rangers: Christian Gosselin; Mikael Samuelsson	
June 24, 2001	To San Jose Sharks: 4th-round pick in 2001	To Chicago Blackhawks: 4th-round pick in 2001; 6th-round pick in 2001; 7th-round pick in 2001	
June 24, 2001	To San Jose Sharks: 5th-round pick in 2001	To Buffalo Sabres: 5th-round pick in 2001; 8th-round pick in 2001; 9th-round pick in 2001	
June 29, 2001	To San Jose Sharks: Rich Pilon	To New York Rangers: Conditional 7th-round pick in 2002	

=== Players acquired ===
Date	Player	Former team	Term	Via	Ref
June 11, 2001	Matt Carkner	Peterborough Petes (OHL)		Free agency	
June 11, 2001	Graig Mischler	Northeastern University (HE)		Free agency	
July 23, 2001	Seamus Kotyk	Ottawa 67's (OHL)		Free agency	
July 23, 2001	Brandon Smith	Boston Bruins		Free agency	
August 15, 2001	Jesse Fibiger	University of Minnesota Duluth (WCHA)		Free agency	
August 15, 2001	Joel Prpic	Colorado Avalanche		Free agency	
September 5, 2001	Mike Craig	Colorado Avalanche		Free agency	
September 27, 2001	Lynn Loyns	Spokane Chiefs (WHL)		Free agency	

=== Players lost ===
Date	Player	New team	Via (Note: In parentheses is the player's free agency group on July 1 if applicable.)	Ref
N/A	Greg Andrusak	Berlin Capitals (DEL)	Free agency (VI)	
July 1, 2001	Jarrett Deuling (Note: Deuling retired.)		Contract expiration (VI)	
July 1, 2001	Doug Friedman (Note: Friedman retired.)		Contract expiration (VI)	
July 5, 2001	Rich Pilon	St. Louis Blues	Free agency (III)	
July 10, 2001	Jim Montgomery	Dallas Stars	Free agency (UFA)	
July 10, 2001	Jeff Norton	Florida Panthers	Free agency (III)	
August 23, 2001	Bill Lindsay	Florida Panthers	Free agency (UFA)	
September 8, 2001	Tony Granato		Retirement (III)	
September 20, 2001	Paul Kruse	Sheffield Steelers (BISL)	Free agency (III)	
September 24, 2001	Rejean Stringer	Columbia Inferno (ECHL)	Free agency (UFA)	
October 3, 2001	Larry Courville	Hershey Bears (AHL)	Free agency (VI)	
October 6, 2001	David MacIsaac	Hershey Bears (AHL)	Free agency (VI)	
November 26, 2001	Terry Friesen	Fresno Falcons (WCHL)	Free agency (UFA)	
May 8, 2002	Mike Craig	SCL Tigers (NLA)	Free agency	

=== Signings ===
Date	Player	Term	Contract type	Ref
June 11, 2001	Vesa Toskala		Re-signing	
July 23, 2001	Hannes Hyvonen		Entry-level	
August 15, 2001	Matt Bradley		Re-signing	
August 15, 2001	Gary Suter	1-year (Note: Club option for a second year.)	Re-signing	
August 17, 2001	Shawn Heins	1-year (Note: Option for a second year.)	Re-signing	
September 5, 2001	Miikka Kiprusoff	1-year	Re-signing	
September 5, 2001	Ryan Kraft		Re-signing	
September 5, 2001	Andy Lundbohm		Re-signing	
September 5, 2001	Mark Smith		Re-signing	
September 7, 2001	Todd Harvey	2-year	Re-signing	
September 18, 2001	Patrick Marleau	1-year	Re-signing	
September 18, 2001	Chad Wiseman		Entry-level	
September 21, 2001	Miikka Kiprusoff	1-year	Extension	
October 6, 2001	Adam Graves	1-year	Extension	
November 29, 2001	Mike Rathje	4-year	Re-signing	

== Draft picks ==
San Jose's draft picks at the 2001 NHL entry draft at the National Car Rental Center in Sunrise, Florida.

Round	#	Player	Position	Nationality	College/Junior/Club team
1	20	Marcel Goc	Center	Germany	Schwenninger Wild Wings (DEL)
4	106	Christian Ehrhoff	Defense	Germany	Duisburg EV (GerObL)
4	107	Dimitri Patzold	Goaltender	Kazakhstan	Kölner Haie (DEL)
5	140	Tomas Plihal	Left wing	Czechoslovakia	HC Bílí Tygři Liberec (Czech Republic)
6	175	Ryane Clowe	Left wing	Canada	Rimouski Océanic (QMJHL)
6	182	Tom Cavanagh	Center	United States	Harvard University (NCAA)
