= Sébastien Centomo =

Canadian ice hockey player (born 1981)

- Born: March 26, 1981 (age 44) Laval, Quebec, Canada
- Height: 6 ft 1 in (185 cm)
- Weight: 200 lb (91 kg; 14 st 4 lb)
- Position: Goaltender
- Caught: Right
- Played for: Toronto Maple Leafs; HIFK
- NHL draft: Undrafted
- Playing career: 2001–2010

Sébastien Centomo (born March 26, 1981) is a Canadian former professional ice hockey player. He played one game in the National Hockey League (NHL) with the Toronto Maple Leafs during the 2001–02 season, on March 6, 2002, against the Detroit Red Wings. The rest of his career, which lasted from 2001 to 2010, was spent in the minor leagues.

== Career statistics ==
=== Regular season and playoffs ===
			Regular season										Playoffs
Season	Team	League	GP	W	L	T	OTL	MIN	GA	SO	GAA	SV%	GP	W	L	MIN	GA	SO	GAA	SV%
1996–97	Lac St-Louis Lions	QMAAA	27	10	10	2	—	1298	102	0	4.71	.875	5	2	3	348	18	0	3.10	—
1997–98	Laval-Laurentides-Lanaudière Régents	QMAAA	30	16	11	2	—	1696	87	0	2.86	—	—	—	—	—	—	—	—	—
1998–99	Rouyn-Noranda Huskies	QMJHL	32	14	9	4	—	1658	104	1	3.76	.875	2	0	1	28	5	0	10.71	.722
1999–00	Rouyn-Noranda Huskies	QMJHL	50	24	17	3	—	2758	160	1	3.48	.873	11	6	5	695	41	0	3.54	.882
2000–01	Rouyn-Noranda Huskies	QMJHL	46	25	14	4	—	2599	158	3	3.65	.885	1	0	1	60	4	0	4.00	.846
2001–02	Toronto Maple Leafs	NHL	1	0	0	0	—	40	3	0	4.50	.750	—	—	—	—	—	—	—	—
2001–02	Memphis Riverkings	CHL	19	16	1	0	—	1035	36	1	2.09	.934	—	—	—	—	—	—	—	—
2001–02	St. John's Maple Leafs	AHL	25	12	7	4	—	1429	60	2	2.52	.926	11	4	6	691	29	2	2.52	.924
2002–03	St. John's Maple Leafs	AHL	19	7	10	1	—	1045	68	0	3.90	.878	—	—	—	—	—	—	—	—
2002–03	Greensboro Generals	ECHL	10	3	3	3	—	565	24	1	2.55	.926	—	—	—	—	—	—	—	—
2003–04	St. John's Maple Leafs	AHL	39	13	17	4	—	2097	110	2	3.15	.904	—	—	—	—	—	—	—	—
2004–05	Las Vegas Wranglers	ECHL	31	13	12	—	4	1845	80	2	2.60	.923	—	—	—	—	—	—	—	—
2004–05	Long Beach Ice Dogs	ECHL	9	6	1	—	1	460	17	1	2.22	.932	6	3	3	378	13	0	2.06	.930
2005–06	HIFK	FIN	1	0	0	—	1	65	5	0	4.62	.881	—	—	—	—	—	—	—	—
2005–06	Manitoba Moose	AHL	12	5	4	—	1	683	30	2	2.64	.898	—	—	—	—	—	—	—	—
2005–06	Oklahoma City Blazers	CHL	18	9	7	—	1	1058	53	1	3.01	.911	2	0	2	119	77	0	3.53	.909
2006–07	Oklahoma City Blazers	CHL	34	19	12	—	1	1913	100	1	3.14	.906	5	1	4	278	19	0	4.10	.883
2007–08	Mississippi RiverKings	CHL	33	18	9	—	3	1841	77	3	2.51	.915	3	1	2	—	—	0	3.00	.903
2008–09	Laredo Bucks	CHL	39	20	17	—	2	2219	105	2	2.84	.906	5	1	4	—	—	0	2.65	.919
2009–10	Muskegon Lumberjacks	IHL	46	28	10	—	4	2501	106	4	2.54	.911	5	2	2	—	—	0	3.38	.885
NHL totals			1	0	0	0	—	40	3	0	4.50	.750	—	—	—	—	—	—	—	—
