= Andrej Nedorost =

Slovak ice hockey player

- Born: 30 April 1980 (age 46) Trenčín, Czechoslovakia
- Height: 5 ft 11 in (180 cm)
- Weight: 196 lb (89 kg; 14 st 0 lb)
- Position: Center
- Shot: Left
- Played for: VEU Feldkirch; Yertis Pavlodar; HC Berkut; HK Poprad; Slovan Bratislava; HC Slovan Ústečtí Lvi; Skellefteå AIK; Malmö Redhawks; Hamburg Freezers; HC Energie Karlovy Vary; Neftekhimik Nizhnekamsk; Metallurg Magnitogorsk; Columbus Blue Jackets; HC Keramika Plzeň; Moskitos Essen; Dukla Trenčín
- National team: Slovakia
- NHL draft: 286th overall, 2000; Columbus Blue Jackets
- Playing career: 1998–2015

Andrej Nedorost (born 30 April 1980) is a Slovak former professional ice hockey player. He played 28 games in the National Hockey League with the Columbus Blue Jackets between 2001 and 2003. The rest of his career, which lasted from 1998 to 2015, was mainly spent in various European leagues. Internationally Nedorost played for the Slovak national team at the 2001 World Championships.

== Biography ==
Nedorost was born in Trenčín, Czechoslovakia. As a youth, he played in the 1994 Quebec International Pee-Wee Hockey Tournament with a team from Bratislava.

He played 28 games in the National Hockey League with the Columbus Blue Jackets, scoring two goals and providing three assists. After playing in the Czech Extraliga in the 2007–08 season for HC Slovan Ústí nad Labem, Nedorost returned to HC Dukla Trenčín in Slovakia in September 2008. He later played for Yertis Pavlodar of the Kazakhstan Hockey Championship.

== Career statistics ==
=== Regular season and playoffs ===
			Regular season					Playoffs
Season	Team	League	GP	G	A	Pts	PIM	GP	G	A	Pts	PIM
1997–98	Dukla Trenčín	SVK	1	0	0	0	0	—	—	—	—	—
1998–99	Moskitos Essen	GER-2	30	3	5	8	22	—	—	—	—	—
1999–00	Moskitos Essen	DEL	55	3	3	6	26	—	—	—	—	—
1999–00	Moskitos Essen	GER U20	4	3	2	5	0	—	—	—	—	—
2000–01	HC Keramika Plzeň	CZE U20	2	0	0	0	0	—	—	—	—	—
2000–01	HC Keramika Plzeň	ELH	33	10	8	18	22	—	—	—	—	—
2000–01	IHC Písek	CZE-2	1	0	0	0	2	—	—	—	—	—
2001–02	Columbus Blue Jackets	NHL	7	0	2	2	2	—	—	—	—	—
2001–02	Syracuse Crunch	AHL	37	5	13	18	28	10	1	3	4	4
2002–03	Columbus Blue Jackets	NHL	12	0	1	1	4	—	—	—	—	—
2002–03	Syracuse Crunch	AHL	63	14	19	33	85	—	—	—	—	—
2003–04	Columbus Blue Jackets	NHL	9	2	0	2	6	—	—	—	—	—
2003–04	Syracuse Crunch	AHL	8	0	2	2	6	—	—	—	—	—
2003–04	Metallurg Magnitogorsk	RSL	16	3	4	7	12	7	0	3	3	6
2004–05	Metallurg Magnitogorsk	RSL	12	1	0	1	4	—	—	—	—	—
2004–05	Metallurg–2 Magnitogorsk	RUS-3	1	0	0	0	0	—	—	—	—	—
2004–05	Neftekhimik Nizehnekamsk	RSL	7	0	0	0	4	—	—	—	—	—
2004–05	HC Energie Karlovy Vary	ELH	20	6	5	11	14	—	—	—	—	—
2005–06	HC Energie Karlovy Vary	ELH	36	7	11	18	26	—	—	—	—	—
2005–06	Hamburg Freezers	DEL	5	0	2	2	4	6	1	0	1	2
2006–07	Malmö Redhawks	SEL	21	2	6	8	20	—	—	—	—	—
2006–07	Skellefteå AIK	SEL	14	4	2	6	10	—	—	—	—	—
2007–08	HC Slovan Ústečtí Lvi	ELH	38	1	2	3	36	—	—	—	—	—
2008–09	Dukla Trenčín	SVK	37	16	14	30	67	4	0	1	1	14
2009–10	HC Slovan Bratislava	SVK	36	6	22	28	22	15	3	5	8	8
2010–11	HC Slovan Bratislava	SVK	11	2	0	2	6	7	5	2	7	6
2011–12	HK AutoFinance Poprad	SVK	5	1	1	2	4	—	—	—	—	—
2011–12	HC Berkut	UKR	8	4	5	9	0	—	—	—	—	—
2012–13	HC Berkut	UKR	26	13	8	21	8	—	—	—	—	—
2013–14	Yertis Pavlodar	KAZ	32	3	4	7	18	5	2	0	2	6
2014–15	VEU Feldkirch	INL	17	3	7	10	8	11	4	4	8	16
SVK totals			90	25	37	62	99	26	8	8	16	28
ELH totals			127	24	26	50	98	—	—	—	—	—
NHL totals			28	2	3	5	12	—	—	—	—	—

=== International ===
Year	Team	Event	GP	G	A	Pts	PIM
1998	Slovakia	EJC	6	1	1	2	4
2001	Slovakia	WC	4	0	0	0	4
Junior totals			6	1	1	2	4
Senior totals			4	0	0	0	4
