= Paul Healey =

Canadian ice hockey player

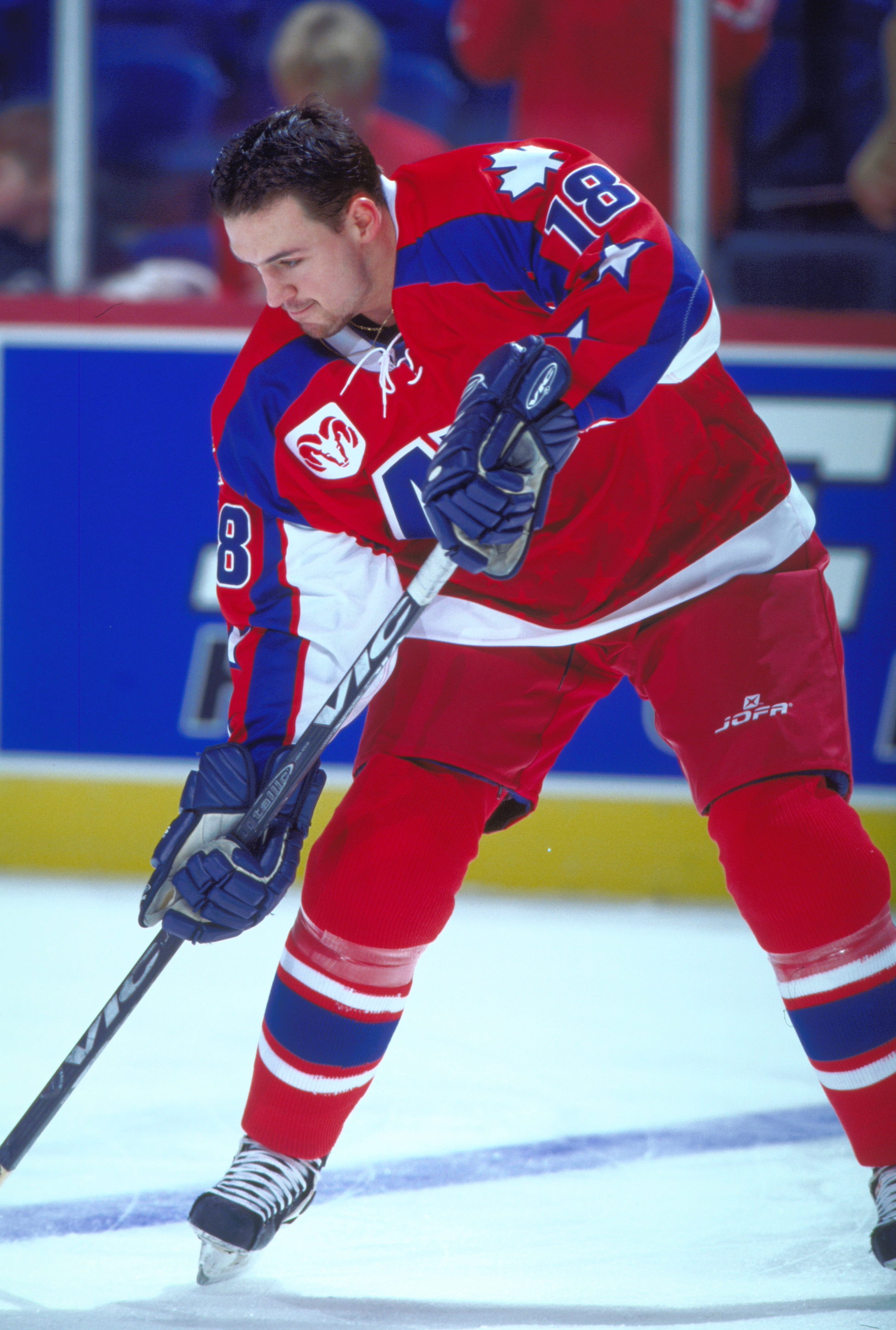
- Born: March 20, 1975 (age 50) Edmonton, Alberta, Canada
- Height: 6 ft 2 in (188 cm)
- Weight: 198 lb (90 kg; 14 st 2 lb)
- Position: Left wing
- Shot: Right
- Played for: Philadelphia Flyers; Toronto Maple Leafs; New York Rangers; Colorado Avalanche; Linköpings HC; Ässät
- NHL draft: 192nd overall, 1993; Philadelphia Flyers
- Playing career: 1995–2009

Paul Healey (born March 20, 1975) is a Canadian former professional ice hockey winger. He played 77 games in the National Hockey League with the Philadelphia Flyers, Toronto Maple Leafs, New York Rangers, and Colorado Avalanche between 1996 and 2005. The rest of his career, which lasted from 1995 to 2009, was mainly spent in the minor American Hockey League, though he also played several years in Europe.

== Career statistics ==
=== Regular season and playoffs ===
| | | | Regular season | | | | | Playoffs |
| Season | Team | League | GP | G | A | Pts | PIM | GP | G | A | Pts | PIM |
|---|---|---|---|---|---|---|---|---|---|---|---|---|
| 1992–93 | Prince Albert Raiders | WHL | 72 | 12 | 20 | 32 | 66 | — | — | — | — | — |
| 1993–94 | Prince Albert Raiders | WHL | 63 | 23 | 26 | 49 | 70 | — | — | — | — | — |
| 1994–95 | Prince Albert Raiders | WHL | 71 | 43 | 50 | 93 | 67 | 12 | 3 | 4 | 7 | 2 |
| 1995–96 | Hershey Bears | AHL | 61 | 7 | 15 | 22 | 35 | — | — | — | — | — |
| 1996–97 | Philadelphia Phantoms | AHL | 64 | 21 | 19 | 40 | 56 | 10 | 4 | 1 | 5 | 10 |
| 1996–97 | Philadelphia Flyers | NHL | 2 | 0 | 0 | 0 | 0 | — | — | — | — | — |
| 1997–98 | Philadelphia Phantoms | AHL | 71 | 34 | 18 | 52 | 48 | 20 | 6 | 2 | 8 | 4 |
| 1997–98 | Philadelphia Flyers | NHL | 4 | 0 | 0 | 0 | 12 | — | — | — | — | — |
| 1998–99 | Philadelphia Phantoms | AHL | 72 | 26 | 20 | 46 | 39 | 15 | 4 | 6 | 10 | 11 |
| 1999–00 | Milwaukee Admirals | AHL | 76 | 21 | 18 | 39 | 28 | 3 | 1 | 2 | 3 | 0 |
| 2000–01 | Hamilton Bulldogs | AHL | 79 | 39 | 32 | 71 | 34 | — | — | — | — | — |
| 2001–02 | Toronto Maple Leafs | NHL | 21 | 3 | 7 | 10 | 2 | 18 | 0 | 1 | 1 | 2 |
| 2001–02 | St. John's Maple Leafs | AHL | 58 | 27 | 29 | 56 | 30 | 2 | 1 | 1 | 2 | 8 |
| 2002–03 | St. John's Maple Leafs | AHL | 17 | 6 | 10 | 16 | 12 | — | — | — | — | — |
| 2002–03 | Toronto Maple Leafs | NHL | 44 | 3 | 7 | 10 | 16 | 4 | 0 | 1 | 1 | 2 |
| 2003–04 | Hartford Wolf Pack | AHL | 50 | 11 | 10 | 21 | 37 | — | — | — | — | — |
| 2003–04 | New York Rangers | NHL | 4 | 0 | 0 | 0 | 0 | — | — | — | — | — |
| 2003–04 | San Antonio Rampage | AHL | 18 | 5 | 5 | 10 | 20 | — | — | — | — | — |
| 2004–05 | San Antonio Rampage | AHL | 62 | 6 | 17 | 23 | 50 | — | — | — | — | — |
| 2004–05 | Edmonton Roadrunners | AHL | 17 | 3 | 6 | 9 | 29 | — | — | — | — | — |
| 2005–06 | Lowell Lock Monsters | AHL | 59 | 19 | 21 | 40 | 51 | — | — | — | — | — |
| 2005–06 | Colorado Avalanche | NHL | 2 | 0 | 0 | 0 | 14 | — | — | — | — | — |
| 2006–07 | Linköpings HC | SEL | 24 | 0 | 2 | 2 | 22 | — | — | — | — | — |
| 2006–07 | Ässät | SM-l | 25 | 3 | 2 | 5 | 39 | — | — | — | — | — |
| 2007–08 | HK Acroni Jesenice | EBEL | 45 | 13 | 19 | 32 | 52 | 5 | 3 | 2 | 5 | 4 |
| 2008–09 | Vienna Capitals | EBEL | 34 | 10 | 9 | 19 | 50 | 11 | 2 | 2 | 4 | 8 |
| 2009–10 | Florida Everblades | ECHL | 13 | 4 | 3 | 7 | 8 | — | — | — | — | — |
| AHL totals | | | 628 | 204 | 202 | 406 | 441 | 47 | 15 | 10 | 25 | 33 |
| NHL totals | | | 77 | 6 | 14 | 20 | 44 | 22 | 0 | 2 | 2 | 4 |

== Awards and honours ==
| Award | Year |
|---|---|
WHL
| East Second All-Star Team | 1995 |
AHL
| Calder Cup (Philadelphia Phantoms) | 1998 |
| All-Star Game | 2001 |
