= 2001–02 New Jersey Devils season =

National Hockey League season

2001–02 New Jersey Devils
- Division: 3rd Atlantic
- Conference: 6th Eastern
- 2001–02 record: 41–28–9–4
- Home record: 22–13–4–2
- Road record: 19–15–5–2
- Goals for: 205
- Goals against: 187

Team information
- General manager: Lou Lamoriello
- Coach: Larry Robinson (Oct.–Jan.); Kevin Constantine (Jan.–Apr.)
- Captain: Scott Stevens
- Alternate captains: Bobby Holik; Scott Niedermayer
- Arena: Continental Airlines Arena
- Average attendance: 15,925
- Minor league affiliate: Albany River Rats

Team leaders
- Goals: Patrik Elias (29)
- Assists: Brian Rafalski (40)
- Points: Patrik Elias (61)
- Penalty minutes: Colin White (133)
- Plus/minus: Sergei Brylin (+21)
- Wins: Martin Brodeur (38)
- Goals against average: Martin Brodeur (2.15)

The 2001–02 New Jersey Devils season was the 28th season for the National Hockey League (NHL) franchise that was established on June 11, 1974, and 20th season since the franchise relocated from Colorado prior to the 1982–83 NHL season. The Devils finished sixth in the Eastern Conference and were eliminated in the first round of the playoffs. Fifty-one games in to the season, head coach Larry Robinson was fired and Kevin Constantine was named his replacement for their final 31 games. On April 13, 2002, the Devils clinched a sixth-place Conference finish and a third-place Division finish. The Devils came into the playoffs for the 6th consecutive season but they were upset in the Conference Quarterfinals by the eventual Eastern Conference champions, the Carolina Hurricanes, losing in six games.

== Regular season ==
The Devils had the fewest power-play opportunities during the regular season, with just 261, and they tied the Washington Capitals for the fewest short-handed goals scored, with just two. However, the Devils were also the most disciplined team during the regular season, finishing with an NHL-low 265 power-play opportunities against.

=== Season standings ===
Atlantic Division
No.	CR		GP	W	L	T	OTL	GF	GA	Pts
1	2	**Philadelphia Flyers**	82	42	27	10	3	234	192	97
2	5	**New York Islanders**	82	42	28	8	4	239	220	96
3	6	**New Jersey Devils**	82	41	28	9	4	205	187	95
4	11	New York Rangers	82	36	38	4	4	227	258	80
5	12	Pittsburgh Penguins	82	28	41	8	5	198	249	69

Note: CR = Conference rank; GP = Games played; W = Wins; L = Losses; T = Ties; OTL = Overtime loss; GF = Goals for; GA = Goals against; Pts = Points
Bolded teams qualified for the playoffs.

Eastern Conference
R		Div	GP	W	L	T	OTL	GF	GA	Pts
**1**	**Z-** Boston Bruins	**NE**	**82**	**43**	**24**	**6**	**9**	**236**	**201**	101
**2**	**Y-** Philadelphia Flyers	**AT**	**82**	**42**	**27**	**10**	**3**	**234**	**192**	97
**3**	**Y-** Carolina Hurricanes	**SE**	**82**	**35**	**26**	**16**	**5**	**217**	**217**	91
**4**	**X-** Toronto Maple Leafs	**NE**	**82**	**43**	**25**	**10**	**4**	**249**	**207**	100
**5**	**X-** New York Islanders	**AT**	**82**	**42**	**28**	**8**	**4**	**239**	**220**	96
**6**	**X-** New Jersey Devils	**AT**	**82**	**41**	**28**	**9**	**4**	**205**	**187**	95
**7**	**X-** Ottawa Senators	**NE**	**82**	**39**	**27**	**9**	**7**	**243**	**208**	94
**8**	**X-** Montreal Canadiens	**NE**	**82**	**36**	**31**	**12**	**3**	**207**	**209**	87
8.5
9	Washington Capitals	SE	82	36	33	11	2	228	240	85
10	Buffalo Sabres	NE	82	35	35	11	1	213	200	82
11	New York Rangers	AT	82	36	38	4	4	227	258	80
12	Pittsburgh Penguins	AT	82	28	41	8	5	198	249	69
13	Tampa Bay Lightning	SE	82	27	40	11	4	178	219	69
14	Florida Panthers	SE	82	22	44	10	6	180	250	60
15	Atlanta Thrashers	SE	82	19	47	11	5	187	288	54

Divisions: AT – Atlantic, NE – Northeast, SE – Southeast

Z – Clinched conference; Y – Clinched division; X – Clinched playoff spot

== Playoffs ==
=== Eastern Conference Quarterfinals ===
==== (E6) New Jersey Devils vs. (E3) Carolina Hurricanes ====
The series opened in Raleigh. Carolina won Games 1 and 2, 2–1 – Game 1 in regulation and Game 2 in overtime. Games 3 and 4 were at the Meadowlands. The Devils won Game 3, 4–0, and Game 4, 3–1. Game 5 was back in Raleigh, where the Hurricanes won 3–2 in overtime. Game 6 shifted back to the Meadowlands, where Carolina prevailed 1–0 and clinched the series victory, 4–2.

== Schedule and results ==
=== Regular season ===
2001–02 regular season
October: 5–3–0–1 (home: 3–1–0–0; road: 2–2–0–1)

Game	Date	Score	Opponent	Record	Recap
1	October 6, 2001	1–6	@ Washington Capitals (2001–02)	0–1–0–0	L
2	October 11, 2001	4–6	New York Islanders (2001–02)	0–2–0–0	L
3	October 13, 2001	1–3	@ Montreal Canadiens (2001–02)	0–3–0–0	L
4	October 17, 2001	3–4 OT	@ New York Rangers (2001–02)	0–3–0–1	OTL
5	October 18, 2001	6–1	San Jose Sharks (2001–02)	1–3–0–1	W
6	October 20, 2001	3–2	Ottawa Senators (2001–02)	2–3–0–1	W
7	October 23, 2001	2–1	@ Ottawa Senators (2001–02)	3–3–0–1	W
8	October 27, 2001	3–1	Buffalo Sabres (2001–02)	4–3–0–1	W
9	October 30, 2001	4–3 OT	@ Boston Bruins (2001–02)	5–3–0–1	W

November: 4–7–2–1 (home: 3–4–0–0; road: 1–3–2–1)

Game	Date	Score	Opponent	Record	Recap
10	November 1, 2001	5–2	Phoenix Coyotes (2001–02)	6–3–0–1	W
11	November 3, 2001	1–2	Boston Bruins (2001–02)	6–4–0–1	L
12	November 7, 2001	3–2	Atlanta Thrashers (2001–02)	7–4–0–1	W
13	November 9, 2001	3–2 OT	Toronto Maple Leafs (2001–02)	8–4–0–1	W
14	November 10, 2001	1–1 OT	@ Toronto Maple Leafs (2001–02)	8–4–1–1	T
15	November 13, 2001	1–5	Pittsburgh Penguins (2001–02)	8–5–1–1	L
16	November 15, 2001	4–5 OT	@ Boston Bruins (2001–02)	8–5–1–2	OTL
17	November 17, 2001	1–3	Philadelphia Flyers (2001–02)	8–6–1–2	L
18	November 18, 2001	0–2	Colorado Avalanche (2001–02)	8–7–1–2	L
19	November 20, 2001	3–3 OT	@ Philadelphia Flyers (2001–02)	8–7–2–2	T
20	November 23, 2001	0–2	@ Tampa Bay Lightning (2001–02)	8–8–2–2	L
21	November 24, 2001	5–1	@ Florida Panthers (2001–02)	9–8–2–2	W
22	November 27, 2001	0–6	@ Pittsburgh Penguins (2001–02)	9–9–2–2	L
23	November 30, 2001	2–4	@ Detroit Red Wings (2001–02)	9–10–2–2	L

December: 7–4–3–0 (home: 4–2–2–0; road: 3–2–1–0)

Game	Date	Score	Opponent	Record	Recap
24	December 1, 2001	4–1	Detroit Red Wings (2001–02)	10–10–2–2	W
25	December 4, 2001	1–1 OT	Tampa Bay Lightning (2001–02)	10–10–3–2	T
26	December 5, 2001	2–1	@ Montreal Canadiens (2001–02)	11–10–3–2	W
27	December 8, 2001	3–1	Washington Capitals (2001–02)	12–10–3–2	W
28	December 10, 2001	1–3	@ Columbus Blue Jackets (2001–02)	12–11–3–2	L
29	December 12, 2001	3–2 OT	New York Islanders (2001–02)	13–11–3–2	W
30	December 14, 2001	2–3	Florida Panthers (2001–02)	13–12–3–2	L
31	December 15, 2001	2–0	@ Ottawa Senators (2001–02)	14–12–3–2	W
32	December 19, 2001	2–2 OT	@ New York Rangers (2001–02)	14–12–4–2	T
33	December 20, 2001	3–3 OT	Edmonton Oilers (2001–02)	14–12–5–2	T
34	December 22, 2001	0–1	Ottawa Senators (2001–02)	14–13–5–2	L
35	December 26, 2001	4–0	Pittsburgh Penguins (2001–02)	15–13–5–2	W
36	December 29, 2001	2–4	@ Vancouver Canucks (2001–02)	15–14–5–2	L
37	December 30, 2001	2–1	@ Edmonton Oilers (2001–02)	16–14–5–2	W

January: 7–6–2–1 (home: 4–2–1–1; road: 3–4–1–0)

Game	Date	Score	Opponent	Record	Recap
38	January 1, 2002	2–1	St. Louis Blues (2001–02)	17–14–5–2	W
39	January 3, 2002	3–4	Nashville Predators (2001–02)	17–15–5–2	L
40	January 5, 2002	2–1	@ Carolina Hurricanes (2001–02)	18–15–5–2	W
41	January 7, 2002	2–3	Los Angeles Kings (2001–02)	18–16–5–2	L
42	January 9, 2002	5–1	Calgary Flames (2001–02)	19–16–5–2	W
43	January 10, 2002	2–3	@ Philadelphia Flyers (2001–02)	19–17–5–2	L
44	January 12, 2002	1–2	@ Buffalo Sabres (2001–02)	19–18–5–2	L
45	January 15, 2002	4–5 OT	Tampa Bay Lightning (2001–02)	19–18–5–3	OTL
46	January 17, 2002	6–4	New York Rangers (2001–02)	20–18–5–3	W
47	January 19, 2002	3–3 OT	Carolina Hurricanes (2001–02)	20–18–6–3	T
48	January 21, 2002	2–3	@ Tampa Bay Lightning (2001–02)	20–19–6–3	L
49	January 23, 2002	3–1	@ Florida Panthers (2001–02)	21–19–6–3	W
50	January 24, 2002	2–4	@ Atlanta Thrashers (2001–02)	21–20–6–3	L
51	January 26, 2002	2–2 OT	@ Minnesota Wild (2001–02)	21–20–7–3	T
52	January 29, 2002	3–1	@ New York Islanders (2001–02)	22–20–7–3	W
53	January 30, 2002	3–1	Chicago Blackhawks (2001–02)	23–20–7–3	W

February: 3–2–2–0 (home: 1–2–1–0; road: 2–0–1–0)

Game	Date	Score	Opponent	Record	Recap
54	February 5, 2002	0–1	Montreal Canadiens (2001–02)	23–21–7–3	L
55	February 7, 2002	3–3 OT	Atlanta Thrashers (2001–02)	23–21–8–3	T
56	February 9, 2002	2–1 OT	@ Pittsburgh Penguins (2001–02)	24–21–8–3	W
57	February 10, 2002	4–1	Buffalo Sabres (2001–02)	25–21–8–3	W
58	February 12, 2002	2–2 OT	@ Buffalo Sabres (2001–02)	25–21–9–3	T
59	February 26, 2002	4–3	@ New York Rangers (2001–02)	26–21–9–3	W
60	February 27, 2002	0–1	Philadelphia Flyers (2001–02)	26–22–9–3	L

March: 9–5–0–1 (home: 4–2–0–1; road: 5–3–0–0)

Game	Date	Score	Opponent	Record	Recap
61	March 1, 2002	4–2	Toronto Maple Leafs (2001–02)	27–22–9–3	W
62	March 4, 2002	0–2	@ Colorado Avalanche (2001–02)	27–23–9–3	L
63	March 5, 2002	1–4	@ Phoenix Coyotes (2001–02)	27–24–9–3	L
64	March 8, 2002	1–2	@ Mighty Ducks of Anaheim (2001–02)	27–25–9–3	L
65	March 10, 2002	3–0	@ Dallas Stars (2001–02)	28–25–9–3	W
66	March 13, 2002	3–2	New York Islanders (2001–02)	29–25–9–3	W
67	March 16, 2002	3–1	New York Rangers (2001–02)	30–25–9–3	W
68	March 17, 2002	2–3 OT	Vancouver Canucks (2001–02)	30–25–9–4	OTL
69	March 20, 2002	3–1	@ Chicago Blackhawks (2001–02)	31–25–9–4	W
70	March 21, 2002	4–3	@ Nashville Predators (2001–02)	32–25–9–4	W
71	March 23, 2002	2–4	Carolina Hurricanes (2001–02)	32–26–9–4	L
72	March 25, 2002	3–1	Florida Panthers (2001–02)	33–26–9–4	W
73	March 27, 2002	4–3	@ Pittsburgh Penguins (2001–02)	34–26–9–4	W
74	March 29, 2002	1–3	Washington Capitals (2001–02)	34–27–9–4	L
75	March 30, 2002	3–1	@ Toronto Maple Leafs (2001–02)	35–27–9–4	W

April: 6–1–0–0 (home: 3–0–0–0; road: 3–1–0–0)

Game	Date	Score	Opponent	Record	Recap
76	April 1, 2002	2–4	@ New York Islanders (2001–02)	35–28–9–4	L
77	April 3, 2002	3–2	@ Carolina Hurricanes (2001–02)	36–28–9–4	W
78	April 5, 2002	3–1	@ Atlanta Thrashers (2001–02)	37–28–9–4	W
79	April 7, 2002	3–2 OT	Boston Bruins (2001–02)	38–28–9–4	W
80	April 10, 2002	1–0	Philadelphia Flyers (2001–02)	39–28–9–4	W
81	April 12, 2002	5–2	Montreal Canadiens (2001–02)	40–28–9–4	W
82	April 13, 2002	4–3 OT	@ Washington Capitals (2001–02)	41–28–9–4	W

Legend: W Win (2 points) L Loss (0 points) T Tie (1 point) OTL Overtime loss (1 point)

=== Playoffs ===
2002 Stanley Cup playoffs
Eastern Conference Quarterfinals vs. (3) Carolina Hurricanes – Hurricanes win 4–2

Game	Date	Score	Opponent	Series	Recap
1	April 17, 2002	1–2	@ Carolina Hurricanes	Hurricanes lead 1–0	L
2	April 19, 2002	1–2 OT	@ Carolina Hurricanes	Hurricanes lead 2–0	L
3	April 21, 2002	4–0	Carolina Hurricanes	Hurricanes lead 2–1	W
4	April 23, 2002	3–1	Carolina Hurricanes	Series tied 2–2	W
5	April 24, 2002	2–3 OT	@ Carolina Hurricanes	Hurricanes lead 3–2	L
6	April 27, 2002	0–1	Carolina Hurricanes	Hurricanes win 4–2	L

Legend: W Win L Loss

== Player statistics ==
=== Scoring ===
- Position abbreviations: C = Center; D = Defense; G = Goaltender; LW = Left wing; RW = Right wing
- † = Joined team via a transaction (e.g., trade, waivers, signing) during the season. Stats reflect time with the Devils only.
- ‡ = Left team via a transaction (e.g., trade, waivers, release) during the season. Stats reflect time with the Devils only.

No.	Player	Pos	Regular season						Playoffs					
No.	Player	Pos	GP	G	A	Pts	+/-	PIM	GP	G	A	Pts	+/-	PIM
26	Patrik Elias	LW	75	29	32	61	4	36	6	2	4	6	−1	6
16	Bobby Holik	C	81	25	29	54	7	97	6	4	1	5	4	2
17	Petr Sykora	RW	73	21	27	48	12	44	4	0	1	1	1	0
23	Scott Gomez	C	76	10	38	48	−4	36	—	—	—	—	—	—
28	Brian Rafalski	D	76	7	40	47	15	18	6	3	2	5	−2	4
18	Sergei Brylin	LW	76	16	28	44	21	10	6	0	2	2	3	2
25	Jason Arnott‡	C	63	22	19	41	3	59	—	—	—	—	—	—
27	Scott Niedermayer	D	76	11	22	33	12	30	6	0	2	2	−1	6
11	John Madden	C	82	15	8	23	6	25	6	0	0	0	−1	0
4	Scott Stevens	D	82	1	16	17	15	44	6	0	0	0	5	4
20	Jay Pandolfo	RW	65	4	10	14	12	15	6	0	0	0	0	0
21	Randy McKay‡	RW	55	6	7	13	2	65	—	—	—	—	—	—
22	Valeri Kamensky†	LW	30	4	8	12	−2	18	2	0	0	0	0	0
14	Brian Gionta	RW	33	4	7	11	10	8	6	2	2	4	−1	0
25	Joe Nieuwendyk†	C	14	2	9	11	2	4	5	0	1	1	−2	0
12	Sergei Nemchinov	LW	68	5	5	10	−9	10	3	0	0	0	−2	0
21 (Note: Salomonsson wore number 15 until Langenbrunner was acquired.)	Andreas Salomonsson	LW	39	4	5	9	−12	22	4	0	1	1	1	0
10	Christian Berglund	LW	15	2	7	9	−3	8	3	0	0	0	2	0
19	Jim McKenzie	LW	67	3	5	8	0	123	6	0	0	0	0	2
22	Pierre Dagenais‡	RW	16	3	3	6	−5	4	—	—	—	—	—	—
15	Jamie Langenbrunner†	RW	14	3	3	6	2	23	5	0	1	1	−2	8
3	Ken Daneyko	D	67	0	6	6	2	60	6	0	0	0	3	8
5	Colin White	D	73	2	3	5	6	133	6	0	0	0	−1	2
6	Tommy Albelin	D	42	1	3	4	0	4	6	0	0	0	−4	0
30	Martin Brodeur	G	73	0	4	4		8	6	0	0	0		0
9	Bruce Gardiner†	RW	7	2	1	3	−1	2	—	—	—	—	—	—
44	Stephane Richer†	RW	10	1	2	3	−1	0	3	0	0	0	−1	0
7	Andrei Zyuzin†	D	38	1	2	3	1	25	—	—	—	—	—	—
24	Turner Stevenson	RW	21	0	2	2	−3	25	1	0	0	0	0	4
29	Josef Boumedienne‡	D	1	1	0	1	−1	2	—	—	—	—	—	—
29	Joel Bouchard†	D	1	0	1	1	1	0	—	—	—	—	—	—
2	Mike Commodore	D	37	0	1	1	−12	30	—	—	—	—	—	—
9	Jiri Bicek	RW	1	0	0	0	−1	0	—	—	—	—	—	—
40	Scott Clemmensen	G	2	0	0	0		0	—	—	—	—	—	—
1	Jean-Francois Damphousse	G	6	0	0	0		0	—	—	—	—	—	—
7	Sascha Goc‡	D	2	0	0	0	−2	0	—	—	—	—	—	—
34	John Vanbiesbrouck†	G	5	0	0	0		4	—	—	—	—	—	—

=== Goaltending ===
- † = Joined team via a transaction (e.g., trade, waivers, signing) during the season. Stats reflect time with the Devils only.

No.	Player	Regular season										Playoffs								
No.	Player	GP	W	L	T	SA	GA	GAA	SV%	SO	TOI	GP	W	L	SA	GA	GAA	SV%	SO	TOI
30	Martin Brodeur	73	38	26	9	1655	156	2.15	.906	4	4347	6	2	4	145	9	1.42	.938	1	381
34	John Vanbiesbrouck†	5	2	3	0	117	10	2.00	.915	0	300	—	—	—	—	—	—	—	—	—
1	Jean-Francois Damphousse	6	1	3	0	115	12	2.45	.896	0	294	—	—	—	—	—	—	—	—	—
40	Scott Clemmensen	2	0	0	0	5	1	3.00	.800	0	20	—	—	—	—	—	—	—	—	—

== Awards and records ==
=== Awards ===
Type	Award/honor	Recipient	Ref
League (in-season)	NHL All-Star Game selection	Patrik Elias	
League (in-season)	NHL All-Star Game selection	Brian Rafalski (Note: Rafalski did not play and was replaced by Chris Chelios of the Detroit Red Wings.)	
League (in-season)	NHL Player of the Week	Patrik Elias (October 22)	
League (in-season)	NHL Player of the Week	Martin Brodeur (April 1)	
Team	Devils' Players' Player	Jim McKenzie	
Team	Hugh Delano Unsung Hero	Sergei Brylin	
Team	Most Valuable Devil	Martin Brodeur	
Team	Three-Star Award	Patrik Elias	

=== Milestones ===
Milestone	Player	Date	Ref
First game	Josef Boumedienne	October 6, 2001	
First game	Scott Clemmensen	October 6, 2001	
First game	Andreas Salomonsson	October 6, 2001	
First game	Jean-Francois Damphousse	November 23, 2001	
First game	Brian Gionta	December 30, 2001	
First game	Christian Berglund	January 9, 2002	

== Transactions ==
The Devils were involved in the following transactions from June 10, 2001, the day after the deciding game of the 2001 Stanley Cup Final, through June 13, 2002, the day of the deciding game of the 2002 Stanley Cup Final.

=== Trades ===
Date	Details		Ref
June 23, 2001	To New Jersey Devils: Phoenix's 2nd-round pick in 2001; Vancouver's 2nd-round pick in 2001	To Florida Panthers: St. Louis’ 1st-round pick in 2001	
June 23, 2001	To New Jersey Devils: 2nd-round pick in 2001	To Ottawa Senators: 3rd-round pick in 2001; 3rd-round pick in 2001	
June 23, 2001	To New Jersey Devils: 4th-round pick in 2001; 3rd-round pick in 2002	To Phoenix Coyotes: Phoenix's 3rd-round pick in 2001	
June 24, 2001	To New Jersey Devils: 3rd-round pick in 2002	To Atlanta Thrashers: Phoenix's 4th-round pick in 2001; 7th-round pick in 2002	
August 22, 2001	To New Jersey Devils: Future considerations	To Washington Capitals: Chris Ferraro	
November 9, 2001	To New Jersey Devils: Andrei Zyuzin	To Tampa Bay Lightning: Josef Boumedienne; Sascha Goc; Rights to Anton But	
January 16, 2002	To New Jersey Devils: Valeri Kamensky	To Dallas Stars: Andre Lakos; Future considerations	
March 4, 2002	To New Jersey Devils: Mike Rucinski	To Carolina Hurricanes: Ted Drury	
March 19, 2002	To New Jersey Devils: Jamie Langenbrunner; Joe Nieuwendyk	To Dallas Stars: Jason Arnott; Randy McKay; 1st-round pick in 2002	
March 19, 2002	To New Jersey Devils: Stephane Richer	To Pittsburgh Penguins: 7th-round pick in 2003	

=== Players acquired ===
Date	Player	Former team	Term	Via	Ref
July 5, 2001	Tommy Albelin	Calgary Flames		Free agency	
August 7, 2001	Ted Drury	Columbus Blue Jackets		Free agency	
October 21, 2001	Bruce Gardiner	Columbus Blue Jackets		Free agency	
October 21, 2001	Steve Guolla	Atlanta Thrashers		Free agency	
October 25, 2001	Joel Bouchard	Phoenix Coyotes		Free agency	

=== Players lost ===
Date	Player	New team	Via (Note: In parentheses is the player's free agency group on July 1 if applicable.)	Ref
June 10, 2001	John Vanbiesbrouck		Retirement (III) (Note: Vanbiesbrouck came out of retirement on February 4, 2002 to re-sign with New Jersey.)	
July 1, 2001	Bryan Duce (Note: Duce retired from professional hockey.)		Contract expiration (UFA)	
July 2, 2001	Sean O'Donnell	Boston Bruins	Free agency (V)	
July 3, 2001	Alexander Mogilny	Toronto Maple Leafs	Free agency (III)	
July 5, 2001	Ken Sutton	New York Islanders	Free agency (III)	
July 16, 2001	Bob Corkum	Atlanta Thrashers	Free agency (III)	
July 27, 2001	Doug Stienstra	Bracknell Bees (BISL)	Free agency (UFA)	
October 29, 2001	Ed Ward	Timra IK (SHL)	Free agency (III)	
January 12, 2002	Pierre Dagenais	Florida Panthers	Waivers	
May 22, 2002	John Vanbiesbrouck		Retirement	

=== Signings ===
Date	Player	Term	Contract type	Ref
July 5, 2001	Andreas Salomonsson		Entry-level	
August 8, 2001	Bobby Holík	1-year	Arbitration award	
August 16, 2001	Petr Sykora	2-year	Arbitration award	
September 12, 2001	Ken Daneyko	1-year	Extension	
September 17, 2001	Turner Stevenson		Re-signing	
October 2, 2001	Martin Brodeur	5-year	Extension	
November 16, 2001	Scott Stevens	3-year	Extension	
February 4, 2002	John Vanbiesbrouck	1-year	Re-signing	
June 2, 2002	Phil Cole		Entry-level	
June 2, 2002	Steve Guolla		Extension	

== Draft picks ==
The Devils' draft picks at the 2001 NHL entry draft at the National Car Rental Center in Sunrise, Florida.

Rd #	Pick #	Player	Nat	Pos	Team (league)	Notes
1	28	Adrian Foster	Canada	C	Saskatoon Blades (WHL)	
2	44	Igor Pohanka	Slovakia	C	Prince Albert Raiders (WHL)	(Note: The Devils acquired Phoenix's 2001 second-round pick (Igor Pohanka) and Vancouver's 2001 second-round compensatory pick (Tuomas Pihlman) from Florida for St. Louis' 2001 first-round pick (used on Lukas Krajicek) on June 23, 2001. The Devils had originally received the pick from St. Louis in a settlement on January 4, 1999.)
2	48	Tuomas Pihlman	Finland	LW	JYP (SM-liiga)	
2	60	Victor Uchevatov	Russia	D	Torpedo-2 Yaroslavl (Russian Superleague)	(Note: The Devils acquired the 2001 second-round pick from Ottawa for a 2001 third-round pick (used on Neil Komadoski) and a 2001 third-round compensatory pick (later transferred to Tampa Bay and used on Evgeny Artyhukin) on June 23, 2001.) (Note: The Devils' original 2001 second-round pick (transferred to Washington and then Tampa Bay, used on Andreas Holmqvist), along with Sheldon Souray and Josh DeWolf, was traded to Montreal for Vladimir Malakhov on March 1, 2000.)
3	67	Robin Leblanc	Canada	RW	Baie-Comeau Drakkar (QMJHL)	(Note: Compensatory pick. SLAM! Sports coverage)
3	72	Brandon Nolan	Canada	C	Oshawa Generals (OHL)	(Note: The Devils acquired the 2001 third-round pick along with Turner Stevenson from Columbus for Krzysztof Oliwa on June 12, 2000. Nolan never reported for the Devils and was redrafted by Vancouver in the fourth round (111 overall) of the 2003 Draft.) (Note: The Devils had traded their original 2001 third-round pick (used on Beat Schiess-Forster) to Phoenix for the Coyotes' 2002 third-round pick (Chvatal) on June 23, 2001.)
4	128	Andrei Posnov	Russia	F	Krylya Sovetov (Russian Superleague)	
5	163	Andreas Salomonsson	Sweden	LW	Djurgardens IF (Elitserien)	
6	194	James Massen	United States	F	Sioux Falls Stampede (USHL)	
7	0	No seventh-round pick				(Note: The Devils traded their 2001 seventh-round pick (used on Tony Martensson) to Anaheim for Ed Ward on June 12, 2000.)
8	229	Aaron Voros	Canada	RW	Victoria Salsa (BCHL)	(Note: The Devils acquired the 2001 eighth-round pick from Tampa Bay for Minnesota's 2000 ninth-round pick (used on Thomas Ziegler) on June 24, 2000. The Devils had originally received the pick from Minnesota, along with Chris Terreri, for Brad Bombardir on June 23, 2000.)
8	257	Evgeny Gamalei	Russia	?	Voskresensk Khimik (Russian Superleague)	
9	287	No ninth-round pick				(Note: The Devils traded their 2001 ninth-round pick (used on Juha-Pekka Ketola) and Chris Terreri to the Islanders for John Vanbiesbrouck on March 12, 2001.)

== See also ==
- 2001–02 NHL season
