= 2001–02 Montreal Canadiens season =

NHL hockey team season

2001–02 Montreal Canadiens
- Division: 4th Northeast
- Conference: 8th Eastern
- 2001–02 record: 36–31–12–3
- Home record: 21–13–6–1
- Road record: 15–18–6–2
- Goals for: 207
- Goals against: 209

Team information
- General manager: Andre Savard
- Coach: Michel Therrien
- Captain: Saku Koivu
- Alternate captains: Patrice Brisebois; Doug Gilmour; Craig Rivet; Brian Savage (Oct.–Jan.)
- Arena: Molson Centre
- Average attendance: 20,027 (94.1%)
- Minor league affiliates: Quebec Citadelles; Mississippi Sea Wolves; New Mexico Scorpions

Team leaders
- Goals: Yanic Perreault (27)
- Assists: Doug Gilmour (31)
- Points: Yanic Perreault (56)
- Penalty minutes: Gino Odjick (104)
- Plus/minus: Karl Dykhuis (+16)
- Wins: Jose Theodore (30)
- Goals against average: Jose Theodore (2.11)

The 2001–02 Montreal Canadiens season was the club's 93rd season. After missing the postseason in the three preceding seasons, the Canadiens returned to the Stanley Cup playoffs. They were eliminated in the Eastern Conference Semifinals by the Carolina Hurricanes by a series score of 4–2.

== Regular season ==
The Canadiens season began with a shocking announcement that team captain Saku Koivu was diagnosed with Burkitt's lymphoma, a non-Hodgkin's lymphoma. This condition kept him out of all but three games in the regular season. On October 5, to respond to Koivu's absence, General Manager Andre Savard signed veteran forward Doug Gilmour to address the absence. The team began the season hovering around the .500 mark, but a five-game winning streak to end November, highlighted by spectacular performances by goaltender Jose Theodore, allowed the Canadiens to climb into the playoff mix. Around this time, Savard added offensive power to the team by acquiring Donald Audette and Shaun Van Allen from the Dallas Stars in exchange for Martin Rucinsky and Benoît Brunet. Head coach Michel Therrien and the Canadiens had a rough December, posting a record of 4–8–2–1 while the newly acquired Audette had his forearm tendons sliced by the skate of New York Rangers forward Radek Dvorak. His season was jeopardized. Despite the inconsistency of the team, Theodore was spectacular in net. In January, the Canadiens played more .500 hockey, which prompted Savard to make a change. He traded forward Brian Savage to the Phoenix Coyotes in exchange for Sergei Berezin. The regular season went on hold for two weeks while the 2002 Winter Olympics were taking place. When play resumed, Jose Theodore took matters into his own hands and carried the Habs into the playoffs, finishing the regular season with a record of 30–24–10, seven shutouts and a goals against average of 2.11. In the 80th game of the regular season, captain Saku Koivu returned from treatment and played his first game of the season against the Ottawa Senators. He played for the team for the rest of the season. The Canadiens made the playoffs with a record of 36–31–12–3 behind the play of eventual Hart Memorial Trophy winner Jose Thoedore.

The Canadiens finished the regular season having allowed the fewest power play goals, with just 38.

In a 2025 interview, Brett Hull said he was ready to sign with Montreal as a free agent in 2001 after a 45 minute phone call with Jean Beliveau, before receiving a call from Chris Chelios asking him to join Detroit. He eventually did join Detroit and won the Cup.

=== Final standings ===
Northeast Division
No.	CR		GP	W	L	T	OTL	GF	GA	Pts
1	1	**Boston Bruins**	82	43	24	6	9	236	201	101
2	4	**Toronto Maple Leafs**	82	43	25	10	4	249	207	100
3	7	**Ottawa Senators**	82	39	27	9	7	243	208	94
4	8	**Montreal Canadiens**	82	36	31	12	3	207	209	87
5	10	Buffalo Sabres	82	35	35	11	1	213	200	82

Note: CR = Conference rank; GP = Games played; W = Wins; L = Losses; T = Ties; OTL = Overtime loss; GF = Goals for; GA = Goals against; Pts = Points
Bolded teams qualified for the playoffs.

Eastern Conference
R		Div	GP	W	L	T	OTL	GF	GA	Pts
**1**	**Z-** Boston Bruins	**NE**	**82**	**43**	**24**	**6**	**9**	**236**	**201**	101
**2**	**Y-** Philadelphia Flyers	**AT**	**82**	**42**	**27**	**10**	**3**	**234**	**192**	97
**3**	**Y-** Carolina Hurricanes	**SE**	**82**	**35**	**26**	**16**	**5**	**217**	**217**	91
**4**	**X-** Toronto Maple Leafs	**NE**	**82**	**43**	**25**	**10**	**4**	**249**	**207**	100
**5**	**X-** New York Islanders	**AT**	**82**	**42**	**28**	**8**	**4**	**239**	**220**	96
**6**	**X-** New Jersey Devils	**AT**	**82**	**41**	**28**	**9**	**4**	**205**	**187**	95
**7**	**X-** Ottawa Senators	**NE**	**82**	**39**	**27**	**9**	**7**	**243**	**208**	94
**8**	**X-** Montreal Canadiens	**NE**	**82**	**36**	**31**	**12**	**3**	**207**	**209**	87
8.5
9	Washington Capitals	SE	82	36	33	11	2	228	240	85
10	Buffalo Sabres	NE	82	35	35	11	1	213	200	82
11	New York Rangers	AT	82	36	38	4	4	227	258	80
12	Pittsburgh Penguins	AT	82	28	41	8	5	198	249	69
13	Tampa Bay Lightning	SE	82	27	40	11	4	178	219	69
14	Florida Panthers	SE	82	22	44	10	6	180	250	60
15	Atlanta Thrashers	SE	82	19	47	11	5	187	288	54

Divisions: AT – Atlantic, NE – Northeast, SE – Southeast

Z – Clinched conference; Y – Clinched division; X – Clinched playoff spot

== Schedule and results ==
=== Regular season ===
2001–02 regular season
October: 5–5–1–0 (home: 2–3–1–0; road: 3–2–0–0)

Game	Date	Score	Opponent	Record	Points	Recap
1	October 4, 2001	6–4	@ Ottawa Senators (2001–02)	1–0–0–0	2	W
2	October 6, 2001	2–2 OT	Toronto Maple Leafs (2001–02)	1–0–1–0	3	T
3	October 9, 2001	3–1	Mighty Ducks of Anaheim (2001–02)	2–0–1–0	5	W
4	October 12, 2001	3–1	@ Columbus Blue Jackets (2001–02)	3–0–1–0	7	W
5	October 13, 2001	3–1	New Jersey Devils (2001–02)	4–0–1–0	9	W
6	October 15, 2001	1-2	New York Rangers (2001-02)	4-1-1-0	9	L
7	October 19, 2001	1–4	@ Washington Capitals (2001–02)	4–2–1–0	9	L
8	October 20, 2001	1–3	Buffalo Sabres (2001–02)	4–3–1–0	9	L
9	October 26, 2001	5–2	@ Buffalo Sabres (2001–02)	5–3–1–0	11	W
10	October 27, 2001	1–5	Philadelphia Flyers (2001–02)	5–4–1–0	11	L
11	October 30, 2001	1–3	@ Edmonton Oilers (2001–02)	5–5–1–0	11	L

November: 7–3–2–1 (home: 6–0–1–0; road: 1–3–1–1)

Game	Date	Score	Opponent	Record	Points	Recap
12	November 1, 2001	0–4	@ Vancouver Canucks (2001–02)	5–6–1–0	11	L
13	November 3, 2001	2–6	@ Calgary Flames (2001–02)	5–7–1–0	11	L
14	November 6, 2001	1–1 OT	Colorado Avalanche (2001–02)	5–7–2–0	12	T
15	November 8, 2001	3–1	Nashville Predators (2001–02)	6–7–2–0	14	W
16	November 10, 2001	3–2	New York Islanders (2001–02)	7–7–2–0	16	W
17	November 11, 2001	2–3 OT	@ New York Rangers (2001–02)	7–7–2–1	17	OTL
18	November 13, 2001	3–5	@ Boston Bruins (2001–02)	7–8–2–1	17	L
19	November 17, 2001	1–0 OT	Florida Panthers (2001–02)	8–8–2–1	19	W
20	November 20, 2001	3–2	Boston Bruins (2001–02)	9–8–2–1	21	W
21	November 22, 2001	5–2	@ Atlanta Thrashers (2001–02)	10–8–2–1	23	W
22	November 24, 2001	5–3	Washington Capitals (2001–02)	11–8–2–1	25	W
23	November 27, 2001	5–1	Atlanta Thrashers (2001–02)	12–8–2–1	27	W
24	November 29, 2001	1–1 OT	@ New York Islanders (2001–02)	12–8–3–1	28	T

December: 4–8–2–1 (home: 2–4–1–0; road: 2–4–1–1)

Game	Date	Score	Opponent	Record	Points	Recap
25	December 1, 2001	1–3	New York Rangers (2001–02)	12–9–3–1	28	L
26	December 3, 2001	2–3	Chicago Blackhawks (2001–02)	12–10–3–1	28	L
27	December 5, 2001	1–2	New Jersey Devils (2001–02)	12–11–3–1	28	L
28	December 8, 2001	3–3 OT	Phoenix Coyotes (2001–02)	12–11–4–1	29	T
29	December 10, 2001	4–0	Minnesota Wild (2001–02)	13–11–4–1	31	W
30	December 12, 2001	3–3 OT	@ Atlanta Thrashers (2001–02)	13–11–5–1	32	T
31	December 13, 2001	3–2	@ Philadelphia Flyers (2001–02)	14–11–5–1	34	W
32	December 15, 2001	4–6	@ Toronto Maple Leafs (2001–02)	14–12–5–1	34	L
33	December 17, 2001	3–4	Tampa Bay Lightning (2001–02)	14–13–5–1	34	L
34	December 19, 2001	3–1	@ Pittsburgh Penguins (2001–02)	15–13–5–1	36	W
35	December 20, 2001	0–5	@ Boston Bruins (2001–02)	15–14–5–1	36	L
36	December 22, 2001	2–1	Los Angeles Kings (2001–02)	16–14–5–1	38	W
37	December 26, 2001	1–3	@ Buffalo Sabres (2001–02)	16–15–5–1	38	L
38	December 28, 2001	0–3	@ St. Louis Blues (2001–02)	16–16–5–1	38	L
39	December 29, 2001	5–6 OT	@ New York Islanders (2001–02)	16–16–5–2	39	OTL

January: 6–5–3–1 (home: 3–1–1–1; road: 3–4–2–0)

Game	Date	Score	Opponent	Record	Points	Recap
40	January 3, 2002	2–5	@ Vancouver Canucks (2001–02)	16–17–5–2	39	L
41	January 5, 2002	4–2	@ Calgary Flames (2001–02)	17–17–5–2	41	W
42	January 6, 2002	6–7	@ Edmonton Oilers (2001–02)	17–18–5–2	41	L
43	January 8, 2002	2–4	@ Minnesota Wild (2001–02)	17–19–5–2	41	L
44	January 10, 2002	4–0	New York Islanders (2001–02)	18–19–5–2	43	W
45	January 12, 2002	1–1 OT	@ Toronto Maple Leafs (2001–02)	18–19–6–2	44	T
46	January 14, 2002	3–5	Philadelphia Flyers (2001–02)	18–20–6–2	44	L
47	January 16, 2002	2–0	Washington Capitals (2001–02)	19–20–6–2	46	W
48	January 17, 2002	1–1 OT	@ Carolina Hurricanes (2001–02)	19–20–7–2	47	T
49	January 19, 2002	5–1	@ Tampa Bay Lightning (2001–02)	20–20–7–2	49	W
50	January 21, 2002	5–7	@ Florida Panthers (2001–02)	20–21–7–2	49	L
51	January 23, 2002	5–3	@ Washington Capitals (2001–02)	21–21–7–2	51	W
52	January 26, 2002	1–1 OT	Ottawa Senators (2001–02)	21–21–8–2	52	T
53	January 27, 2002	3–1	San Jose Sharks (2001–02)	22–21–8–2	54	W
54	January 30, 2002	3–4 OT	Boston Bruins (2001–02)	22–21–8–3	55	OTL

February: 3–3–0–0 (home: 1–2–0–0; road: 2–1–0–0)

Game	Date	Score	Opponent	Record	Points	Recap
55	February 5, 2002	1–0	@ New Jersey Devils (2001–02)	23–21–8–3	57	W
56	February 7, 2002	1–0	Pittsburgh Penguins (2001–02)	24–21–8–3	59	W
57	February 9, 2002	1–4	@ Toronto Maple Leafs (2001–02)	24–22–8–3	59	L
58	February 11, 2002	2–3	Detroit Red Wings (2001–02)	24–23–8–3	59	L
59	February 26, 2002	2–5	Ottawa Senators (2001–02)	24–24–8–3	59	L
60	February 27, 2002	3–2	@ Chicago Blackhawks (2001–02)	25–24–8–3	61	W

March: 6–5–4–0 (home: 5–2–2–0; road: 1–3–2–0)

Game	Date	Score	Opponent	Record	Points	Recap
61	March 2, 2002	3–4	Carolina Hurricanes (2001–02)	25–25–8–3	61	L
62	March 4, 2002	5–3	Atlanta Thrashers (2001–02)	26–25–8–3	63	W
63	March 6, 2002	5–3	Boston Bruins (2001–02)	27–25–8–3	65	W
64	March 8, 2002	0–3	@ Buffalo Sabres (2001–02)	27–26–8–3	65	L
65	March 9, 2002	1–1 OT	Toronto Maple Leafs (2001–02)	27–26–9–3	66	T
66	March 11, 2002	1–2	@ New York Rangers (2001–02)	27–27–9–3	66	L
67	March 14, 2002	3–3 OT	Dallas Stars (2001–02)	27–27–10–3	67	T
68	March 16, 2002	3–2	Carolina Hurricanes (2001–02)	28–27–10–3	69	W
69	March 18, 2002	1–1 OT	@ Carolina Hurricanes (2001–02)	28–27–11–3	70	T
70	March 20, 2002	4–1	@ Florida Panthers (2001–02)	29–27–11–3	72	W
71	March 22, 2002	3–3 OT	@ Tampa Bay Lightning (2001–02)	29–27–12–3	73	T
72	March 23, 2002	1–5	@ Nashville Predators (2001–02)	29–28–12–3	73	L
73	March 26, 2002	1–2	Florida Panthers (2001–02)	29–29–12–3	73	L
74	March 28, 2002	2–1	Tampa Bay Lightning (2001–02)	30–29–12–3	75	W
75	March 30, 2002	2–1 OT	Pittsburgh Penguins (2001–02)	31–29–12–3	77	W

April: 5–2–0–0 (home: 2–1–0–0; road: 3–1–0–0)

Game	Date	Score	Opponent	Record	Points	Recap
76	April 1, 2002	3–0	@ Pittsburgh Penguins (2001–02)	32–29–12–3	79	W
77	April 4, 2002	3–1	@ Philadelphia Flyers (2001–02)	33–29–12–3	81	W
78	April 6, 2002	4–1	Columbus Blue Jackets (2001–02)	34–29–12–3	83	W
79	April 7, 2002	3–1	@ Ottawa Senators (2001–02)	35–29–12–3	85	W
80	April 9, 2002	4–3	Ottawa Senators (2001–02)	36–29–12–3	87	W
81	April 12, 2002	2–5	@ New Jersey Devils (2001–02)	36–30–12–3	87	L
82	April 13, 2002	0–3	Buffalo Sabres (2001–02)	36–31–12–3	87	L

Legend: W Win (2 points) L Loss (0 points) T Tie (1 point) OTL Overtime loss (1 point)

== Playoffs ==
In the first round of the playoffs, the Canadiens were matched against the Boston Bruins, who finished first overall in the Eastern Conference. Donald Audette lead the way with three goals and Saku Koivu had a goal and an assist to win game one 5–2 for Montreal. Game 2 would prove to be a back-and-forth affair, as both teams traded momentum. Boston won the game by a score of 6–4 despite a four-point performance from the Canadien Richard Zednik. The series shifted to Montreal, and the Canadiens won Game 3 5–3 through by a four-point performance by Koivu. This gave Montreal a 2–1 series lead. The Bruins responded in Game 4 as they won easily, 5–2. Theodore rose to the occasion in Game 5, stopping 43 of 44 shots for a 2–1 win to give the Canadiens a 3–2 series lead going back to the Molson Centre. Theodore was spectacular again in Game 6, and Yanic Perreault scored the game-winning goal to give the Canadiens a 2–1 victory. The Canadiens won the series in six games, upsetting the Conference's top seed.

The Canadiens faced the Carolina Hurricanes in the second round of the playoffs. The Hurricanes won Game 1 2–0 as Hurricanes goaltender Kevin Weekes was awarded the shutout. The Carolina Hurricanes dominated the Canadiens outshooting them 46 to 16, but Theodore only yielded one goal and Koivu had a goal and an assist and the Canadiens won Game 2 4–1 to tie the series. Game 3 went to overtime and due to the heroics of Theodore, he kept his team in the game. The Habs would win Game 3 just over two minutes into overtime on a goal by Donald Audette, giving the Canadiens the series lead. The Habs had momentum in Game 4, establishing a 3–0 lead early in the third period of Game 4. The Hurricanes, however, would score three-straight goals to send the game to overtime, where 'Canes defenceman Niclas Wallin ended the game in overtime to tie the series at 2–2. With newly gained series momentum, the Hurricanes would win the next two games to win take the series at 4–2, outscoring Montreal 13–3 in the process.

2002 Stanley Cup playoffs
Eastern Conference Quarterfinals vs. (1) Boston Bruins – Canadiens win 4–2

Game	Date	Score	Opponent	Series	Recap
1	April 18, 2002	5–2	@ Boston Bruins	Canadiens lead 1–0	W
2	April 21, 2002	4–6	@ Boston Bruins	Series tied 1–1	L
3	April 23, 2002	5–3	Boston Bruins	Canadiens lead 2–1	W
4	April 25, 2002	2–5	Boston Bruins	Series tied 2–2	L
5	April 27, 2002	2–1	@ Boston Bruins	Canadiens lead 3–2	W
6	April 29, 2002	2–1	Boston Bruins	Canadiens win 4–2	W

Eastern Conference Semifinals vs. (3) Carolina Hurricanes – Hurricanes win 4–2

Game	Date	Score	Opponent	Series	Recap
1	May 3, 2002	0–2	@ Carolina Hurricanes	Hurricanes lead 1–0	L
2	May 5, 2002	4–1	@ Carolina Hurricanes	Series tied 1–1	W
3	May 7, 2002	2–1 OT	Carolina Hurricanes	Canadiens lead 2–1	W
4	May 9, 2002	3–4 OT	Carolina Hurricanes	Series tied 2–2	L
5	May 12, 2002	1–5	@ Carolina Hurricanes	Hurricanes lead 3–2	L
6	May 13, 2002	2–8	Carolina Hurricanes	Hurricanes win 4–2	L

Legend: W Win L Loss

== Player statistics ==
=== Scoring ===
- Position abbreviations: C = Centre; D = Defence; G = Goaltender; LW = Left wing; RW = Right wing
- † = Joined team via a transaction (e.g., trade, waivers, signing) during the season. Stats reflect time with the Canadiens only.
- ‡ = Left team via a transaction (e.g., trade, waivers, release) during the season. Stats reflect time with the Canadiens only.

No.	Player	Pos	Regular season						Playoffs					
No.	Player	Pos	GP	G	A	Pts	+/-	PIM	GP	G	A	Pts	+/-	PIM
94	Yanic Perreault	C	82	27	29	56	−3	40	11	3	5	8	0	0
20	Richard Zednik	RW	82	22	22	44	−3	59	4	4	4	8	3	6
14	Oleg Petrov	RW	75	24	17	41	−4	12	12	1	5	6	2	2
93	Doug Gilmour†	C	70	10	31	41	−7	48	12	4	6	10	−2	16
90	Joe Juneau	C	70	8	28	36	−3	10	12	1	4	5	−6	6
24	Andreas Dackell	RW	79	15	18	33	−3	24	12	1	2	3	−4	6
43	Patrice Brisebois	D	71	4	29	33	9	25	10	1	1	2	−4	2
49	Brian Savage‡	LW	47	14	15	29	−14	30	—	—	—	—	—	—
52	Craig Rivet	D	82	8	17	25	1	76	12	0	3	3	2	4
79	Andrei Markov	D	56	5	19	24	−1	24	12	1	3	4	−2	8
25	Chad Kilger	LW	75	8	15	23	−7	27	12	0	1	1	1	9
38	Jan Bulis	C	53	9	10	19	−2	8	6	0	0	0	−6	6
71	Mike Ribeiro	C	43	8	10	18	−11	12	—	—	—	—	—	—
5	Stephane Quintal	D	75	6	10	16	−7	87	12	1	3	4	−2	12
27	Shaun Van Allen†	C	54	6	9	15	5	20	7	0	1	1	−3	2
28	Karl Dykhuis	D	80	5	7	12	16	32	12	1	1	2	2	8
56	Stephane Robidas	D	56	1	10	11	−25	14	2	0	0	0	−1	4
95	Sergei Berezin†	LW	29	4	6	10	3	4	6	1	1	2	2	0
45	Arron Asham	RW	35	5	4	9	7	55	3	0	1	1	1	0
29	Gino Odjick	RW	36	4	4	8	3	104	12	1	0	1	−5	47
44	Sheldon Souray	D	34	3	5	8	−5	62	12	0	1	1	−4	16
26	Martin Rucinsky‡	LW	18	2	6	8	−1	12	—	—	—	—	—	—
82 (Note: Audette wore number 22 in his first five games.)	Donald Audette†	RW	13	1	5	6	1	8	12	6	4	10	−2	10
54	Patrick Traverse	D	25	2	3	5	−7	14	—	—	—	—	—	—
51	Francis Bouillon	D	28	0	5	5	−5	33	—	—	—	—	—	—
37	Patrick Poulin	C	28	0	5	5	6	6	—	—	—	—	—	—
36	Marcel Hossa	LW	10	3	1	4	2	2	—	—	—	—	—	—
22	Bill Lindsay†	RW	13	1	3	4	0	23	11	2	2	4	1	2
39	Reid Simpson‡	LW	25	1	1	2	0	63	—	—	—	—	—	—
17	Benoit Brunet‡	LW	16	0	2	2	−4	4	—	—	—	—	—	—
11	Saku Koivu	C	3	0	2	2	0	0	12	4	6	10	2	4
60	Jose Theodore	G	67	0	2	2		2	12	0	0	0		0
46	Benoit Gratton	C	8	1	0	1	−1	8	—	—	—	—	—	—
78	Eric Landry	C	2	0	1	1	2	0	—	—	—	—	—	—
63	Craig Darby	C	2	0	0	0	0	0	—	—	—	—	—	—
35	Stephane Fiset†	G	2	0	0	0		0	1	0	0	0		0
30	Mathieu Garon	G	5	0	0	0		0	—	—	—	—	—	—
31	Jeff Hackett	G	15	0	0	0		2	—	—	—	—	—	—
59	Martti Jarventie	D	1	0	0	0	2	0	—	—	—	—	—	—
95	Olivier Michaud	G	1	0	0	0		0	—	—	—	—	—	—

=== Goaltending ===
- † = Joined team via a transaction (e.g., trade, waivers, signing) during the season. Stats reflect time with the Canadiens only.

No.	Player	Regular season										Playoffs								
No.	Player	GP	W	L	T	SA	GA	GAA	SV%	SO	TOI	GP	W	L	SA	GA	GAA	SV%	SO	TOI
60	Jose Theodore	67	30	24	10	1972	136	2.11	.931	7	3864	12	6	6	413	35	3.06	.915	0	686
31	Jeff Hackett	15	5	5	2	395	38	3.18	.904	0	717	—	—	—	—	—	—	—	—	—
30	Mathieu Garon	5	1	4	0	147	19	4.37	.871	0	261	—	—	—	—	—	—	—	—	—
35	Stephane Fiset†	2	0	1	0	60	7	3.85	.883	0	109	1	0	0	19	3	4.74	.842	0	38
95	Olivier Michaud	1	0	0	0	14	0	0.00	1.000	0	18	—	—	—	—	—	—	—	—	—

== Awards and records ==
=== Awards ===
Type	Award/honour	Recipient	Ref
League (annual)	Bill Masterton Memorial Trophy	Saku Koivu	
League (annual)	Hart Memorial Trophy	Jose Theodore	
League (annual)	NHL Second All-Star Team	Jose Theodore (Goaltender)	
League (annual)	Roger Crozier Saving Grace Award	Jose Theodore	
League (annual)	Vezina Trophy	Jose Theodore	
League (in-season)	NHL All-Star Game selection	Jose Theodore	
League (in-season)	NHL Player of the Week	Jose Theodore (April 8)	
League (in-season)	NHL YoungStars Game selection	Mike Ribeiro	
Team	Jacques Beauchamp Molson Trophy	Joe Juneau	
Team	Molson Cup	Jose Theodore	

=== Milestones ===
Milestone	Player	Date	Ref
First game	Martti Jarventie	October 9, 2001	
First game	Olivier Michaud	October 30, 2001	
First game	Marcel Hossa	January 10, 2002	

== Transactions ==
The Canadiens were involved in the following transactions from June 10, 2001, the day after the deciding game of the 2001 Stanley Cup Final, through June 13, 2002, the day of the deciding game of the 2002 Stanley Cup Final.

=== Trades ===
Date	Details		Ref
June 15, 2001	To Montreal Canadiens: Joe Juneau	To Phoenix Coyotes: Future considerations	
June 23, 2001	To Montreal Canadiens: Stephane Quintal	To Chicago Blackhawks: 4th-round pick in 2001	
June 24, 2001	To Montreal Canadiens: Andreas Dackell	To Ottawa Senators: 8th-round pick in 2001	
November 21, 2001	To Montreal Canadiens: Donald Audette; Shaun Van Allen	To Dallas Stars: Benoit Brunet; Martin Rucinsky	
January 25, 2002	To Montreal Canadiens: Sergei Berezin	To Phoenix Coyotes: Brian Savage; 3rd-round pick in 2002 or 2003 (Note: Phoenix chose the 2002 pick.)	
March 19, 2002	To Montreal Canadiens: Stephane Fiset	To Los Angeles Kings: Future considerations	
May 24, 2002	To Montreal Canadiens: 5th-round pick in 2002	To Minnesota Wild: Rights to Chris Dyment	

=== Players acquired ===
Date	Player	Former team	Term	Via	Ref
July 4, 2001	Yanic Perreault	Toronto Maple Leafs	3-year	Free agency	
September 10, 2001	Reid Simpson	St. Louis Blues	1-year (Note: Option for second year.)	Free agency	
September 18, 2001	Olivier Michaud	Shawinigan Cataractes (QMJHL)	3-year	Free agency	
October 6, 2001	Doug Gilmour	Buffalo Sabres	1-year (Note: Club option for a second year.)	Free agency	
March 19, 2002	Bill Lindsay	Florida Panthers		Waivers	

=== Players lost ===
Date	Player	New team	Via (Note: In parentheses is the player's free agency group on July 1 if applicable.)	Ref
N/A	Miloslav Guren	HC Ocelari Trinec (ELH)	Free agency (II) (Note: Montreal retained Guren’s NHL rights through the 2005–06 season.)	
June 20, 2001	Barry Richter	Linkoping HC (SHL)	Free agency (UFA)	
August 7, 2001	Andrei Bashkirov	Lausanne HC (NLA)	Free agency (VI)	
September 1, 2001	Josh DeWolf	Detroit Red Wings	Free agency (UFA)	
September 7, 2001	Mike McBain	Bracknell Bees (BISL)	Free agency (UFA)	
October 2, 2001	Eric Fichaud	Manitoba Moose (AHL)	Free agency (UFA)	
November 9, 2001	Eric Bertrand	Bracknell Bees (BISL)	Free agency (VI)	
November 19, 2001	Jim Campbell	Chicago Blackhawks	Free agency (UFA)	
December 26, 2001	Matt Higgins	Bridgeport Sound Tigers (AHL)	Free agency (UFA)	
January 30, 2002	Reid Simpson	Nashville Predators	Waivers	
May 6, 2002	Xavier Delisle	Augsburger Panther (DEL)	Free agency	

=== Signings ===
Date	Player	Term	Contract type	Ref
June 15, 2001	Joe Juneau	3-year	Re-signing	
July 4, 2001	Stephane Robidas	2-year	Re-signing	
July 9, 2001	Craig Darby	2-year	Re-signing	
July 13, 2001	Martti Jarventie	2-year	Entry-level	
July 13, 2001	Vadim Tarasov	1-year	Entry-level	
July 13, 2001	Timo Vertala	2-year	Entry-level	
August 1, 2001	Arron Asham	1-year	Re-signing	
August 1, 2001	Francis Bouillon	1-year	Re-signing	
August 1, 2001	Xavier Delisle	1-year	Re-signing	
August 1, 2001	Mathieu Garon	1-year	Re-signing	
August 1, 2001	Chad Kilger	1-year	Re-signing	
August 1, 2001	Saku Koivu	1-year	Re-signing	
August 1, 2001	Gennady Razin	1-year	Re-signing	
August 1, 2001	Brian Savage	1-year	Re-signing	
August 14, 2001	Marcel Hossa	3-year	Entry-level	
December 1, 2001	Karl Dykhuis	3-year	Extension	
December 18, 2001	Patrice Brisebois	3-year	Extension	
April 22, 2002	Jozef Balej	3-year	Entry-level	
April 22, 2002	Tomas Plekanec	3-year	Entry-level	
June 3, 2002	Christian Larrivee	3-year	Entry-level	

== Draft picks ==
Montreal's draft picks at the 2001 NHL entry draft held at the National Car Rental Center in Sunrise, Florida.

Round	#	Player	Nationality	College/Junior/Club team (League)
1	7	Mike Komisarek	United States	University of Michigan (CCHA)
1	25	Alexander Perezhogin	Russia	Avangard Omsk (Russia)
2	37	Duncan Milroy	Canada	Swift Current Broncos (WHL)
3	71	Tomas Plekanec	Czech Republic	Rabat Kladno (Czech Republic)
4	109	Martti Jarventie	Finland	TPS (Finland)
6	171	Eric Himelfarb	Canada	Sarnia Sting (OHL)
7	203	Andrew Archer	Canada	Guelph Storm (OHL)
9	266	Viktor Ujcik	Czech Republic	Slavia Prague (Czech Republic)

== See also ==
- 2001–02 NHL season
