= 2001–02 Washington Capitals season =

NHL hockey team season

2001–02 Washington Capitals
- Division: 2nd Southeast
- Conference: 9th Eastern
- 2001–02 record: 36–33–11–2
- Home record: 21–12–6–2
- Road record: 15–21–5–0
- Goals for: 228
- Goals against: 240

Team information
- General manager: George McPhee
- Coach: Ron Wilson
- Captain: Steve Konowalchuk; Brendan Witt
- Alternate captains: Peter Bondra; Jaromir Jagr; Calle Johansson
- Arena: MCI Center
- Average attendance: 17,341
- Minor league affiliates: Portland Pirates; Richmond Renegades

Team leaders
- Goals: Peter Bondra (39)
- Assists: Adam Oates (57)
- Points: Jaromir Jagr (79)
- Penalty minutes: Chris Simon (137)
- Plus/minus: Frantisek Kucera (+7)
- Wins: Olaf Kolzig (31)
- Goals against average: Olaf Kolzig (2.79)

The 2001–02 Washington Capitals season was the team's 28th season of play. The team finished second in the Southeast, but ninth overall in the Eastern Conference to miss the playoffs for the first time since the 1998–99 season.

== Off-season ==
On September 27, Steve Konowalchuk and Brendan Witt were named co-captains.

== Regular season ==
The Caps tied the New Jersey Devils for fewest short-handed goals scored, with just 2.

=== Final standings ===
Southeast Division
No.	CR		GP	W	L	T	OTL	GF	GA	Pts
1	3	**Carolina Hurricanes**	82	35	26	16	5	217	217	91
2	9	Washington Capitals	82	36	33	11	2	228	240	85
3	13	Tampa Bay Lightning	82	27	40	11	4	178	219	69
4	14	Florida Panthers	82	22	44	10	6	180	250	60
5	15	Atlanta Thrashers	82	19	47	11	5	187	288	54

Note: CR = Conference rank; GP = Games played; W = Wins; L = Losses; T = Ties; OTL = Overtime loss; GF = Goals for; GA = Goals against; Pts = Points
Bolded teams qualified for the playoffs.

Eastern Conference
R		Div	GP	W	L	T	OTL	GF	GA	Pts
**1**	**Z-** Boston Bruins	**NE**	**82**	**43**	**24**	**6**	**9**	**236**	**201**	101
**2**	**Y-** Philadelphia Flyers	**AT**	**82**	**42**	**27**	**10**	**3**	**234**	**192**	97
**3**	**Y-** Carolina Hurricanes	**SE**	**82**	**35**	**26**	**16**	**5**	**217**	**217**	91
**4**	**X-** Toronto Maple Leafs	**NE**	**82**	**43**	**25**	**10**	**4**	**249**	**207**	100
**5**	**X-** New York Islanders	**AT**	**82**	**42**	**28**	**8**	**4**	**239**	**220**	96
**6**	**X-** New Jersey Devils	**AT**	**82**	**41**	**28**	**9**	**4**	**205**	**187**	95
**7**	**X-** Ottawa Senators	**NE**	**82**	**39**	**27**	**9**	**7**	**243**	**208**	94
**8**	**X-** Montreal Canadiens	**NE**	**82**	**36**	**31**	**12**	**3**	**207**	**209**	87
8.5
9	Washington Capitals	SE	82	36	33	11	2	228	240	85
10	Buffalo Sabres	NE	82	35	35	11	1	213	200	82
11	New York Rangers	AT	82	36	38	4	4	227	258	80
12	Pittsburgh Penguins	AT	82	28	41	8	5	198	249	69
13	Tampa Bay Lightning	SE	82	27	40	11	4	178	219	69
14	Florida Panthers	SE	82	22	44	10	6	180	250	60
15	Atlanta Thrashers	SE	82	19	47	11	5	187	288	54

Divisions: AT – Atlantic, NE – Northeast, SE – Southeast

Z – Clinched conference; Y – Clinched division; X – Clinched playoff spot

== Schedule and results ==
2001–02 regular season
October: 5–6–1–0 (home: 2–1–0–0; road: 3–5–1–0)

Game	Date	Score	Opponent	Record	Recap
1	October 6, 2001	6–1	New Jersey Devils (2001–02)	1–0–0–0	W
2	October 8, 2001	0–4	@ Boston Bruins (2001–02)	1–1–0–0	L
3	October 10, 2001	5–2	@ New York Rangers (2001–02)	2–1–0–0	W
4	October 12, 2001	1–2	@ Mighty Ducks of Anaheim (2001–02)	2–2–0–0	L
5	October 13, 2001	2–5	@ Phoenix Coyotes (2001–02)	2–3–0–0	L
6	October 16, 2001	3–2 OT	@ Los Angeles Kings (2001–02)	3–3–0–0	W
7	October 19, 2001	4–1	Montreal Canadiens (2001–02)	4–3–0–0	W
8	October 20, 2001	3–6	@ Philadelphia Flyers (2001–02)	4–4–0–0	L
9	October 23, 2001	1–1 OT	@ Tampa Bay Lightning (2001–02)	4–4–1–0	T
10	October 24, 2001	4–3 OT	@ Florida Panthers (2001–02)	5–4–1–0	W
11	October 26, 2001	0–1	@ Atlanta Thrashers (2001–02)	5–5–1–0	L
12	October 30, 2001	0–3	Philadelphia Flyers (2001–02)	5–6–1–0	L

November: 5–7–2–0 (home: 5–3–1–0; road: 0–4–1–0)

Game	Date	Score	Opponent	Record	Recap
13	November 2, 2001	2–2 OT	Phoenix Coyotes (2001–02)	5–6–2–0	T
14	November 3, 2001	1–4	@ St. Louis Blues (2001–02)	5–7–2–0	L
15	November 6, 2001	2–4	@ Toronto Maple Leafs (2001–02)	5–8–2–0	L
16	November 8, 2001	2–3	Carolina Hurricanes (2001–02)	5–9–2–0	L
17	November 10, 2001	3–0	Atlanta Thrashers (2001–02)	6–9–2–0	W
18	November 13, 2001	5–11	Ottawa Senators (2001–02)	6–10–2–0	L
19	November 15, 2001	0–5	@ Philadelphia Flyers (2001–02)	6–11–2–0	L
20	November 17, 2001	4–1	Mighty Ducks of Anaheim (2001–02)	7–11–2–0	W
21	November 21, 2001	3–2	Tampa Bay Lightning (2001–02)	8–11–2–0	W
22	November 23, 2001	6–2	New York Rangers (2001–02)	9–11–2–0	W
23	November 24, 2001	3–5	@ Montreal Canadiens (2001–02)	9–12–2–0	L
24	November 27, 2001	5–5 OT	@ New York Islanders (2001–02)	9–12–3–0	T
25	November 28, 2001	2–5	Buffalo Sabres (2001–02)	9–13–3–0	L
26	November 30, 2001	6–2	Carolina Hurricanes (2001–02)	10–13–3–0	W

December: 5–4–4–0 (home: 3–1–3–0; road: 2–3–1–0)

Game	Date	Score	Opponent	Record	Recap
27	December 2, 2001	4–3 OT	@ Carolina Hurricanes (2001–02)	11–13–3–0	W
28	December 4, 2001	5–2	New York Rangers (2001–02)	12–13–3–0	W
29	December 6, 2001	3–3 OT	@ Atlanta Thrashers (2001–02)	12–13–4–0	T
30	December 8, 2001	1–3	@ New Jersey Devils (2001–02)	12–14–4–0	L
31	December 11, 2001	2–2 OT	Pittsburgh Penguins (2001–02)	12–14–5–0	T
32	December 13, 2001	2–1	Boston Bruins (2001–02)	13–14–5–0	W
33	December 15, 2001	5–2	Atlanta Thrashers (2001–02)	14–14–5–0	W
34	December 19, 2001	2–5	@ Florida Panthers (2001–02)	14–15–5–0	L
35	December 21, 2001	3–4	@ Pittsburgh Penguins (2001–02)	14–16–5–0	L
36	December 22, 2001	4–4 OT	Pittsburgh Penguins (2001–02)	14–16–6–0	T
37	December 26, 2001	1–4	Philadelphia Flyers (2001–02)	14–17–6–0	L
38	December 28, 2001	3–2 OT	@ Dallas Stars (2001–02)	15–17–6–0	W
39	December 30, 2001	5–5 OT	Carolina Hurricanes (2001–02)	15–17–7–0	T

January: 5–9–1–1 (home: 3–4–1–1; road: 2–5–0–0)

Game	Date	Score	Opponent	Record	Recap
40	January 1, 2002	3–2	New York Islanders (2001–02)	16–17–7–0	W
41	January 3, 2002	1–4	@ Ottawa Senators (2001–02)	16–18–7–0	L
42	January 5, 2002	4–7	@ Boston Bruins (2001–02)	16–19–7–0	L
43	January 7, 2002	1–2	Florida Panthers (2001–02)	16–20–7–0	L
44	January 9, 2002	6–3	Columbus Blue Jackets (2001–02)	17–20–7–0	W
45	January 11, 2002	3–3 OT	Toronto Maple Leafs (2001–02)	17–20–8–0	T
46	January 12, 2002	1–0	@ Florida Panthers (2001–02)	18–20–8–0	W
47	January 14, 2002	1–0 OT	Boston Bruins (2001–02)	19–20–8–0	W
48	January 16, 2002	0–2	@ Montreal Canadiens (2001–02)	19–21–8–0	L
49	January 18, 2002	1–3	@ Detroit Red Wings (2001–02)	19–22–8–0	L
50	January 19, 2002	1–5	Vancouver Canucks (2001–02)	19–23–8–0	L
51	January 22, 2002	3–0	@ Atlanta Thrashers (2001–02)	20–23–8–0	W
52	January 23, 2002	3–5	Montreal Canadiens (2001–02)	20–24–8–0	L
53	January 26, 2002	3–6	@ New York Rangers (2001–02)	20–25–8–0	L
54	January 27, 2002	2–3 OT	Buffalo Sabres (2001–02)	20–25–8–1	OTL
55	January 30, 2002	1–4	St. Louis Blues (2001–02)	20–26–8–1	L

February: 4–1–1–0 (home: 3–1–0–0; road: 1–0–1–0)

Game	Date	Score	Opponent	Record	Recap
56	February 6, 2002	2–1	Minnesota Wild (2001–02)	21–26–8–1	W
57	February 8, 2002	3–3 OT	@ Nashville Predators (2001–02)	21–26–9–1	T
58	February 9, 2002	4–2	@ Tampa Bay Lightning (2001–02)	22–26–9–1	W
59	February 11, 2002	3–1	Tampa Bay Lightning (2001–02)	23–26–9–1	W
60	February 26, 2002	4–3	Florida Panthers (2001–02)	24–26–9–1	W
61	February 28, 2002	2–5	San Jose Sharks (2001–02)	24–27–9–1	L

March: 9–5–1–0 (home: 3–2–0–0; road: 6–3–1–0)

Game	Date	Score	Opponent	Record	Recap
62	March 2, 2002	3–2 OT	@ Ottawa Senators (2001–02)	25–27–9–1	W
63	March 4, 2002	2–3	Toronto Maple Leafs (2001–02)	25–28–9–1	L
64	March 6, 2002	3–2	Calgary Flames (2001–02)	26–28–9–1	W
65	March 8, 2002	2–2 OT	@ Carolina Hurricanes (2001–02)	26–28–10–1	T
66	March 10, 2002	4–2	Edmonton Oilers (2001–02)	27–28–10–1	W
67	March 12, 2002	2–5	Dallas Stars (2001–02)	27–29–10–1	L
68	March 15, 2002	4–5	@ San Jose Sharks (2001–02)	27–30–10–1	L
69	March 16, 2002	1–4	@ Edmonton Oilers (2001–02)	27–31–10–1	L
70	March 19, 2002	3–0	@ Colorado Avalanche (2001–02)	28–31–10–1	W
71	March 21, 2002	4–3	@ Toronto Maple Leafs (2001–02)	29–31–10–1	W
72	March 23, 2002	5–2	@ Columbus Blue Jackets (2001–02)	30–31–10–1	W
73	March 24, 2002	2–6	@ Pittsburgh Penguins (2001–02)	30–32–10–1	L
74	March 26, 2002	4–3	@ Buffalo Sabres (2001–02)	31–32–10–1	W
75	March 29, 2002	3–1	@ New Jersey Devils (2001–02)	32–32–10–1	W
76	March 30, 2002	4–2	New York Islanders (2001–02)	33–32–10–1	W

April: 3–1–1–1 (home: 2–0–1–1; road: 1–1–0–0)

Game	Date	Score	Opponent	Record	Recap
77	April 3, 2002	4–1	Tampa Bay Lightning (2001–02)	34–32–10–1	W
78	April 5, 2002	0–0 OT	Ottawa Senators (2001–02)	34–32–11–1	T
79	April 6, 2002	4–5	@ New York Islanders (2001–02)	34–33–11–1	L
80	April 9, 2002	3–1	Chicago Blackhawks (2001–02)	35–33–11–1	W
81	April 12, 2002	3–1	@ Buffalo Sabres (2001–02)	36–33–11–1	W
82	April 13, 2002	3–4 OT	New Jersey Devils (2001–02)	36–33–11–2	OTL

Legend: W Win (2 points) L Loss (0 points) T Tie (1 point) OTL Overtime loss (1 point)

== Player statistics ==
=== Scoring ===
- Position abbreviations: C = Center; D = Defense; G = Goaltender; LW = Left wing; RW = Right wing
- † = Joined team via a transaction (e.g., trade, waivers, signing) during the season. Stats reflect time with the Capitals only.
- ‡ = Left team via a transaction (e.g., trade, waivers, release) during the season. Stats reflect time with the Capitals only.

No.	Player	Pos	Regular season					
No.	Player	Pos	GP	G	A	Pts	+/-	PIM
68	Jaromir Jagr	RW	69	31	48	79	0	30
12	Peter Bondra	RW	77	39	31	70	−2	80
77	Adam Oates‡	C	66	11	57	68	−2	22
55	Sergei Gonchar	D	76	26	33	59	−1	58
10	Ulf Dahlen	LW	69	23	29	52	−5	8
9	Dainius Zubrus	C	71	17	26	43	5	38
13	Andrei Nikolishin	C	80	13	23	36	−1	40
17	Chris Simon	LW	82	14	17	31	−8	137
8	Dmitri Khristich	C	61	9	12	21	2	12
11	Jeff Halpern	C	48	5	14	19	−9	29
20	Glen Metropolit†	C	33	1	16	17	3	6
2	Ken Klee	D	68	8	8	16	4	38
3	Sylvain Cote	D	70	3	11	14	−15	26
22	Steve Konowalchuk	LW	28	2	12	14	−2	23
4	Frantisek Kucera	D	56	1	13	14	7	12
18	Matt Pettinger	LW	61	7	3	10	−8	44
19	Brendan Witt	D	68	3	7	10	−1	78
36	Colin Forbes†	C	38	5	3	8	−2	15
14	Joe Sacco	RW	65	0	7	7	−13	51
29	Joe Reekie‡	D	38	2	4	6	−7	41
24	Rob Zettler	D	49	1	4	5	3	56
51	Stephen Peat	RW	38	2	2	4	−1	85
58	Jean-Francois Fortin	D	36	1	3	4	−1	20
16	Trevor Linden‡	RW	16	1	2	3	−2	6
6	Calle Johansson	D	11	2	0	2	−4	8
40	Nolan Yonkman	D	11	1	0	1	3	4
23	Ivan Ciernik†	RW	6	0	1	1	0	2
48	Chris Corrinet	RW	8	0	1	1	−4	6
27	Chris Ferraro	C	1	0	1	1	0	0
28	Peter Ferraro	LW	4	0	1	1	−1	0
33	Benoit Hogue†	C	9	0	1	1	2	4
37	Olaf Kolzig	G	71	0	1	1		8
38	Todd Rohloff	D	16	0	1	1	−2	14
23	Trent Whitfield‡†	C	24	0	1	1	−3	28
1	Craig Billington	G	17	0	0	0		0
39	Patrick Boileau	D	2	0	0	0	−1	2
35	Sebastien Charpentier	G	2	0	0	0		0
34	Jakub Cutta	D	2	0	0	0	−3	0
46	Mike Farrell	RW	8	0	0	0	−1	0
57	Dean Melanson	D	4	0	0	0	1	4
41	Brian Sutherby	C	7	0	0	0	−3	2

=== Goaltending ===
No.	Player	Regular season									
No.	Player	GP	W	L	T	SA	GA	GAA	SV%	SO	TOI
37	Olaf Kolzig	71	31	29	8	1977	192	2.79	.903	6	4131
1	Craig Billington	17	4	5	3	295	36	3.04	.878	0	710
35	Sebastien Charpentier	2	1	1	0	78	5	2.46	.936	0	122

== Awards and records ==
=== Awards ===
Type	Award/honor	Recipient	Ref
League (annual)	NHL Second All-Star Team	Sergei Gonchar (Defense)	
League (in-season)	NHL All-Star Game selection	Sergei Gonchar	
League (in-season)	NHL All-Star Game selection	Jaromir Jagr (Note: Jagr was voted to the starting lineup.)	

=== Milestones ===
Milestone	Player	Date	Ref
First game	Brian Sutherby	October 6, 2001	
First game	Stephen Peat	October 8, 2001	
First game	Chris Corrinet	October 30, 2001	
First game	Mike Farrell	November 23, 2001	
First game	Jean-Francois Fortin	January 9, 2002	
First game	Todd Rohloff	January 9, 2002	
First game	Nolan Yonkman	January 14, 2002	
First game	Sebastien Charpentier	April 12, 2002	
400th goal scored	Peter Bondra	December 4, 2001	
25th shutout	Olaf Kolzig	January 22, 2002	

== Transactions ==
The Capitals were involved in the following transactions from June 10, 2001, the day after the deciding game of the 2001 Stanley Cup Final, through June 13, 2002, the day of the deciding game of the 2002 Stanley Cup Final.

=== Trades ===
Date	Details		Ref
June 23, 2001	To Washington Capitals: 2nd-round pick in 2002	To Tampa Bay Lightning: New Jersey’s 2nd-round pick in 2001	
July 11, 2001	To Washington Capitals: Jaromir Jagr; Frantisek Kucera	To Pittsburgh Penguins: Kris Beech; Ross Lupaschuk; Michal Sivek; Future considerations	
August 22, 2001	To Washington Capitals: Chris Ferraro	To New Jersey Devils: Future considerations	
November 10, 2001	To Washington Capitals: 1st-round pick in 2002; 3rd-round pick in 2002 or 2003 (Note: Washington’s option.)	To Vancouver Canucks: Trevor Linden; 2nd-round pick in 2002	
January 17, 2002	To Washington Capitals: Future considerations (Note: 4th-round pick in 2002)	To Chicago Blackhawks: Joe Reekie	
March 19, 2002	To Washington Capitals: Maxime Ouellet; 1st-round pick in 2002; 2nd-round pick in 2002; 3rd-round pick in 2002	To Philadelphia Flyers: Adam Oates	
June 12, 2002	To Washington Capitals: 1st-round pick in 2002	To Dallas Stars: Philadelphia’s 1st-round pick in 2002; 2nd-round pick in 2002 6th-round pick in 2003	

=== Players acquired ===
Date	Player	Former team	Term	Via	Ref
August 1, 2001	Peter Ferraro	Boston Bruins	1-year	Free agency	
October 20, 2001	Glen Metropolit	Tampa Bay Lightning		Waivers	
January 8, 2002	Colin Forbes	Portland Pirates (AHL)	1-year	Free agency	
January 19, 2002	Ivan Ciernik	Ottawa Senators		Waivers	
February 1, 2002	Trent Whitfield	New York Rangers		Waivers	
March 19, 2002	Benoit Hogue	Boston Bruins		Waivers	
April 9, 2002	Graham Mink	Portland Pirates (AHL)	2-year	Free agency	

=== Players lost ===
Date	Player	New team	Via (Note: In parentheses is the player's free agency group on July 1 if applicable.)	Ref
July 1, 2001	Jamie Huscroft (Note: Huscroft retired.)		Contract expiration (III)	
July 1, 2001	Brantt Myhres (Note: Myhres was inactive during the 2001–02 season.)		Contract expiration (UFA)	
July 2, 2001	Jason Marshall	Minnesota Wild	Free agency (UFA)	
July 12, 2001	Jeff Nelson	Schwenninger Wild Wings (DEL)	Free agency	
July 19, 2001	Stefan Ustorf	Adler Mannheim (DEL)	Free agency (VI)	
September 24, 2001	James Black	Grand Rapids Griffins (AHL)	Free agency (III)	
September 25, 2001	Derek Bekar	Los Angeles Kings	Free agency (VI)	
September 28, 2001	Glen Metropolit	Tampa Bay Lightning	Waiver draft	
N/A	Steve Shirreffs	Reading Royals (ECHL)	Free agency (UFA)	
October 3, 2001	Terry Yake	Essen Mosquitoes (DEL)	Free agency (III)	
January 16, 2002	Trent Whitfield	New York Rangers	Waivers	
June 11, 2002	Frantisek Kucera	HC Slavia Praha (ELH)	Free agency	

=== Signings ===
Date	Player	Term	Contract type	Ref
June 30, 2001	Adam Oates	1-year	Option exercised	
July 13, 2001	Ulf Dahlen	1-year	Re-signing	
July 19, 2001	Todd Rohloff	2-year	Re-signing	
July 30, 2001	Andrei Nikolishin	1-year	Re-signing	
July 31, 2001	Trent Whitfield	1-year	Re-signing	
August 2, 2001	Corey Hirsch	1-year (Note: Club option for a second year.)	Re-signing	
August 3, 2001	Dean Melanson	2-year	Re-signing	
August 6, 2001	Sebastien Charpentier	1-year	Re-signing	
August 7, 2001	Mark Murphy	1-year	Re-signing	
August 20, 2001	Olaf Kolzig	5-year	Re-signing	
August 30, 2001	Glen Metropolit	1-year	Re-signing	
September 14, 2001	Brendan Witt	3-year	Extension	
September 27, 2001	Jeff Halpern	2-year (Note: Club option for a third year.)	Re-signing	
October 1, 2001	Brian Sutherby	3-year	Entry-level	
October 18, 2001	Jaromir Jagr	5-year	Extension	
June 3, 2002	Sebastien Charpentier	1-year	Option exercised	

== Draft picks ==
Washington's draft picks at the 2001 NHL entry draft held at the National Car Rental Center in Sunrise, Florida.

Round	#	Player	Nationality	College/Junior/Club team (League)
2	58	Nathan Paetsch	Canada	Moose Jaw Warriors (WHL)
3	90	Owen Fussey	Canada	Calgary Hitmen (WHL)
4	125	Jeff Lucky	Canada	Spokane Chiefs (WHL)
5	160	Artyom Ternavsky	Russia	Sherbrooke Beavers (QMJHL)
6	191	Zbynek Novak	Czech Republic	Slavia Prague (Czech Republic)
7	221	Johnny Oduya	Sweden	Victoriaville Tigres (QMJHL)
8	249	Matthew Maglione	United States	Princeton University (NCAA)
8	254	Peter Polcik	Slovakia	HK Ardo Nitra (Slovakia)
9	275	Robert Muller	Germany	Adler Manheim (Germany)
9	284	Viktor Hubl	Czech Republic	Slavia Prague (Czech Republic)

== See also ==
- 2001–02 NHL season
