= 2001–02 Buffalo Sabres season =

NHL hockey team season

2001–02 Buffalo Sabres
- Division: 5th Northeast
- Conference: 10th Eastern
- 2001–02 record: 35–35–11–1
- Home record: 20–16–5–0
- Road record: 15–19–6–1
- Goals for: 213
- Goals against: 200

Team information
- General manager: Darcy Regier
- Coach: Lindy Ruff
- Captain: Stu Barnes
- Alternate captains: Rob Ray; Jason Woolley
- Arena: HSBC Arena
- Average attendance: 17,206
- Minor league affiliates: Rochester Americans; South Carolina Stingrays

Team leaders
- Goals: Miroslav Satan (37)
- Assists: Miroslav Satan (36)
- Points: Miroslav Satan (73)
- Penalty minutes: Rob Ray (200)
- Plus/minus: Jay McKee (+18)
- Wins: Martin Biron (31)
- Goals against average: Martin Biron (2.22)

The 2001–02 Buffalo Sabres season was the 32nd for the National Hockey League (NHL) franchise that was established on May 22, 1970. The Sabres finished in 5th place in the Northeast Division and failed to qualify for the playoffs for the first time since 1996.

== Offseason ==
The Sabres traded both of their stars, Mike Peca, their former captain and Dominik Hasek in the offseason. Peca was sent to the Islanders for Tim Connolly and Taylor Pyatt. Forward Stu Barnes was named team captain.

== Regular season ==
On October 7, 2001 the Sabres played the New York Rangers in the first pro sports game played in Manhattan after the September 11 attacks. In the game both teams wore special one time jerseys with "New York" written diagonally on the front of the jersey. The jerseys were later auctioned off to raise money for the 9/11 victims fund. The Sabres lost the game 5–4 in overtime.

=== Final standings ===
Northeast Division
No.	CR		GP	W	L	T	OTL	GF	GA	Pts
1	1	**Boston Bruins**	82	43	24	6	9	236	201	101
2	4	**Toronto Maple Leafs**	82	43	25	10	4	249	207	100
3	7	**Ottawa Senators**	82	39	27	9	7	243	208	94
4	8	**Montreal Canadiens**	82	36	31	12	3	207	209	87
5	10	Buffalo Sabres	82	35	35	11	1	213	200	82

Note: CR = Conference rank; GP = Games played; W = Wins; L = Losses; T = Ties; OTL = Overtime loss; GF = Goals for; GA = Goals against; Pts = Points
Bolded teams qualified for the playoffs.

Eastern Conference
R		Div	GP	W	L	T	OTL	GF	GA	Pts
**1**	**Z-** Boston Bruins	**NE**	**82**	**43**	**24**	**6**	**9**	**236**	**201**	101
**2**	**Y-** Philadelphia Flyers	**AT**	**82**	**42**	**27**	**10**	**3**	**234**	**192**	97
**3**	**Y-** Carolina Hurricanes	**SE**	**82**	**35**	**26**	**16**	**5**	**217**	**217**	91
**4**	**X-** Toronto Maple Leafs	**NE**	**82**	**43**	**25**	**10**	**4**	**249**	**207**	100
**5**	**X-** New York Islanders	**AT**	**82**	**42**	**28**	**8**	**4**	**239**	**220**	96
**6**	**X-** New Jersey Devils	**AT**	**82**	**41**	**28**	**9**	**4**	**205**	**187**	95
**7**	**X-** Ottawa Senators	**NE**	**82**	**39**	**27**	**9**	**7**	**243**	**208**	94
**8**	**X-** Montreal Canadiens	**NE**	**82**	**36**	**31**	**12**	**3**	**207**	**209**	87
8.5
9	Washington Capitals	SE	82	36	33	11	2	228	240	85
10	Buffalo Sabres	NE	82	35	35	11	1	213	200	82
11	New York Rangers	AT	82	36	38	4	4	227	258	80
12	Pittsburgh Penguins	AT	82	28	41	8	5	198	249	69
13	Tampa Bay Lightning	SE	82	27	40	11	4	178	219	69
14	Florida Panthers	SE	82	22	44	10	6	180	250	60
15	Atlanta Thrashers	SE	82	19	47	11	5	187	288	54

Divisions: AT – Atlantic, NE – Northeast, SE – Southeast

Z – Clinched conference; Y – Clinched division; X – Clinched playoff spot

== Schedule and results ==
2001–02 regular season
October: 5–6–1–1 (home: 4–4–1–0; road: 1–2–0–1)

Game	Date	Score	Opponent	Record	Recap
1	October 4, 2001	1–2	Atlanta Thrashers (2001–02)	0–1–0–0	L
2	October 6, 2001	3–2	Ottawa Senators (2001–02)	1–1–0–0	W
3	October 7, 2001	4–5 OT	@ New York Rangers (2001–02)	1–1–0–1	OTL
4	October 10, 2001	2–1	Philadelphia Flyers (2001–02)	2–1–0–1	W
5	October 12, 2001	2–4	@ Detroit Red Wings (2001–02)	2–2–0–1	L
6	October 14, 2001	4–1	Pittsburgh Penguins (2001–02)	3–2–0–1	W
7	October 16, 2001	3–3 OT	Nashville Predators (2001–02)	3–2–1–1	T
8	October 19, 2001	1–3	Columbus Blue Jackets (2001–02)	3–3–1–1	L
9	October 20, 2001	3–1	@ Montreal Canadiens (2001–02)	4–3–1–1	W
10	October 23, 2001	4–1	San Jose Sharks (2001–02)	5–3–1–1	W
11	October 26, 2001	2–5	Montreal Canadiens (2001–02)	5–4–1–1	L
12	October 27, 2001	1–3	@ New Jersey Devils (2001–02)	5–5–1–1	L
13	October 30, 2001	2–3	Phoenix Coyotes (2001–02)	5–6–1–1	L

November: 6–7–1–0 (home: 4–2–1–0; road: 2–5–0–0)

Game	Date	Score	Opponent	Record	Recap
14	November 2, 2001	4–1	Tampa Bay Lightning (2001–02)	6–6–1–1	W
15	November 3, 2001	0–3	@ Ottawa Senators (2001–02)	6–7–1–1	L
16	November 8, 2001	8–0	Atlanta Thrashers (2001–02)	7–7–1–1	W
17	November 10, 2001	2–4	New York Rangers (2001–02)	7–8–1–1	L
18	November 12, 2001	5–3	@ Florida Panthers (2001–02)	8–8–1–1	W
19	November 13, 2001	1–4	@ Nashville Predators (2001–02)	8–9–1–1	L
20	November 16, 2001	0–2	Florida Panthers (2001–02)	8–10–1–1	L
21	November 17, 2001	1–3	@ Boston Bruins (2001–02)	8–11–1–1	L
22	November 19, 2001	2–3	@ Atlanta Thrashers (2001–02)	8–12–1–1	L
23	November 21, 2001	4–2	Toronto Maple Leafs (2001–02)	9–12–1–1	W
24	November 23, 2001	5–2	Calgary Flames (2001–02)	10–12–1–1	W
25	November 24, 2001	1–3	@ Pittsburgh Penguins (2001–02)	10–13–1–1	L
26	November 27, 2001	2–2 OT	New York Rangers (2001–02)	10–13–2–1	T
27	November 28, 2001	5–2	@ Washington Capitals (2001–02)	11–13–2–1	W

December: 4–7–2–0 (home: 2–3–1–0; road: 2–4–1–0)

Game	Date	Score	Opponent	Record	Recap
28	December 1, 2001	4–2	@ New York Islanders (2001–02)	12–13–2–1	W
29	December 4, 2001	4–2	@ Carolina Hurricanes (2001–02)	13–13–2–1	W
30	December 7, 2001	1–4	Colorado Avalanche (2001–02)	13–14–2–1	L
31	December 8, 2001	2–4	@ Boston Bruins (2001–02)	13–15–2–1	L
32	December 12, 2001	3–4	@ Dallas Stars (2001–02)	13–16–2–1	L
33	December 14, 2001	3–2 OT	Carolina Hurricanes (2001–02)	14–16–2–1	W
34	December 15, 2001	2–4	@ New York Rangers (2001–02)	14–17–2–1	L
35	December 19, 2001	5–6	Chicago Blackhawks (2001–02)	14–18–2–1	L
36	December 21, 2001	3–3 OT	Toronto Maple Leafs (2001–02)	14–18–3–1	T
37	December 22, 2001	2–3	@ Toronto Maple Leafs (2001–02)	14–19–3–1	L
38	December 26, 2001	3–1	Montreal Canadiens (2001–02)	15–19–3–1	W
39	December 29, 2001	2–2 OT	@ Columbus Blue Jackets (2001–02)	15–19–4–1	T
40	December 31, 2001	4–5	Carolina Hurricanes (2001–02)	15–20–4–1	L

January: 7–5–1–0 (home: 3–2–0–0; road: 4–3–1–0)

Game	Date	Score	Opponent	Record	Recap
41	January 3, 2002	1–3	@ Calgary Flames (2001–02)	15–21–4–1	L
42	January 6, 2002	4–1	@ Minnesota Wild (2001–02)	16–21–4–1	W
43	January 8, 2002	3–2	Vancouver Canucks (2001–02)	17–21–4–1	W
44	January 10, 2002	0–2	Pittsburgh Penguins (2001–02)	17–22–4–1	L
45	January 12, 2002	2–1	New Jersey Devils (2001–02)	18–22–4–1	W
46	January 16, 2002	3–1	@ Mighty Ducks of Anaheim (2001–02)	19–22–4–1	W
47	January 17, 2002	2–4	@ Los Angeles Kings (2001–02)	19–23–4–1	L
48	January 19, 2002	3–1	@ Phoenix Coyotes (2001–02)	20–23–4–1	W
49	January 21, 2002	2–3	@ Colorado Avalanche (2001–02)	20–24–4–1	L
50	January 23, 2002	2–5	St. Louis Blues (2001–02)	20–25–4–1	L
51	January 25, 2002	4–1	Tampa Bay Lightning (2001–02)	21–25–4–1	W
52	January 27, 2002	3–2 OT	@ Washington Capitals (2001–02)	22–25–4–1	W
53	January 29, 2002	2–2 OT	@ Carolina Hurricanes (2001–02)	22–25–5–1	T

February: 1–2–2–0 (home: 1–0–1–0; road: 0–2–1–0)

Game	Date	Score	Opponent	Record	Recap
54	February 5, 2002	2–2 OT	@ Boston Bruins (2001–02)	22–25–6–1	T
55	February 8, 2002	3–2 OT	Ottawa Senators (2001–02)	23–25–6–1	W
56	February 10, 2002	1–4	@ New Jersey Devils (2001–02)	23–26–6–1	L
57	February 12, 2002	2–2 OT	New Jersey Devils (2001–02)	23–26–7–1	T
58	February 26, 2002	1–2	@ Atlanta Thrashers (2001–02)	23–27–7–1	L

March: 8–7–2–0 (home: 4–4–0–0; road: 4–3–2–0)

Game	Date	Score	Opponent	Record	Recap
59	March 1, 2002	4–3	Boston Bruins (2001–02)	24–27–7–1	W
60	March 2, 2002	3–3 OT	@ Toronto Maple Leafs (2001–02)	24–27–8–1	T
61	March 4, 2002	0–3	Edmonton Oilers (2001–02)	24–28–8–1	L
62	March 7, 2002	5–0	@ New York Islanders (2001–02)	25–28–8–1	W
63	March 8, 2002	3–0	Montreal Canadiens (2001–02)	26–28–8–1	W
64	March 10, 2002	5–1	Detroit Red Wings (2001–02)	27–28–8–1	W
65	March 12, 2002	0–3	New York Islanders (2001–02)	27–29–8–1	L
66	March 14, 2002	3–1	@ Philadelphia Flyers (2001–02)	28–29–8–1	W
67	March 15, 2002	2–5	@ Florida Panthers (2001–02)	28–30–8–1	L
68	March 17, 2002	2–2 OT	@ Tampa Bay Lightning (2001–02)	28–30–9–1	T
69	March 19, 2002	5–1	Ottawa Senators (2001–02)	29–30–9–1	W
70	March 21, 2002	1–2	Boston Bruins (2001–02)	29–31–9–1	L
71	March 23, 2002	0–2	@ Toronto Maple Leafs (2001–02)	29–32–9–1	L
72	March 24, 2002	3–2 OT	@ Ottawa Senators (2001–02)	30–32–9–1	W
73	March 26, 2002	3–4	Washington Capitals (2001–02)	30–33–9–1	L
74	March 28, 2002	1–4	@ St. Louis Blues (2001–02)	30–34–9–1	L
75	March 30, 2002	3–1	@ Philadelphia Flyers (2001–02)	31–34–9–1	W

April: 4–1–2–0 (home: 2–1–1–0; road: 2–0–1–0)

Game	Date	Score	Opponent	Record	Recap
76	April 1, 2002	3–1	Philadelphia Flyers (2001–02)	32–34–9–1	W
77	April 3, 2002	1–1 OT	New York Islanders (2001–02)	32–34–10–1	T
78	April 5, 2002	3–1	Florida Panthers (2001–02)	33–34–10–1	W
79	April 7, 2002	5–3	@ Tampa Bay Lightning (2001–02)	34–34–10–1	W
80	April 10, 2002	4–4 OT	@ Pittsburgh Penguins (2001–02)	34–34–11–1	T
81	April 12, 2002	1–3	Washington Capitals (2001–02)	34–35–11–1	L
82	April 13, 2002	3–0	@ Montreal Canadiens (2001–02)	35–35–11–1	W

Legend: W Win (2 points) L Loss (0 points) T Tie (1 point) OTL Overtime loss (1 point)

== Player statistics ==
=== Scoring ===
- Position abbreviations: C = Center; D = Defense; G = Goaltender; LW = Left wing; RW = Right wing
- † = Joined team via a transaction (e.g., trade, waivers, signing) during the season. Stats reflect time with the Sabres only.

No.	Player	Pos	Regular season					
No.	Player	Pos	GP	G	A	Pts	+/-	PIM
81	Miroslav Satan	LW	82	37	36	73	14	33
41	Stu Barnes	C	68	17	31	48	6	26
18	Tim Connolly	C	82	10	35	45	4	34
17	Jean-Pierre Dumont	RW	76	23	21	44	−10	42
61	Maxim Afinogenov	RW	81	21	19	40	−9	69
77	Chris Gratton	C	82	15	24	39	0	75
37	Curtis Brown	C	82	20	17	37	−4	32
44	Alexei Zhitnik	D	82	1	33	34	−1	80
5	Jason Woolley	D	59	8	20	28	−6	34
25	Vaclav Varada	RW	76	7	16	23	−7	82
13	Vyacheslav Kozlov	LW	38	9	13	22	0	16
24	Taylor Pyatt	LW	48	10	10	20	4	35
9	Erik Rasmussen	LW	69	8	11	19	−1	34
3	James Patrick	D	56	5	8	13	3	16
45	Dmitri Kalinin	D	58	2	11	13	−6	26
74	Jay McKee	D	81	2	11	13	18	43
4	Rhett Warrener	D	65	5	5	10	15	113
42	Richard Smehlik	D	60	3	6	9	−9	22
55	Denis Hamel	LW	61	2	6	8	−1	28
51	Brian Campbell	D	29	3	3	6	0	12
26	Eric Boulton	LW	35	2	3	5	−1	129
32	Rob Ray	RW	71	2	3	5	−3	200
12 (Note: Kotalik wore number 20 in his first game.)	Ales Kotalik	RW	13	1	3	4	−1	2
43	Martin Biron	G	72	0	1	1		8
29	Bob Corkum†	C	10	0	1	1	−2	4
19	Norm Milley	RW	5	0	1	1	0	0
31	Bob Essensa	G	9	0	0	0		0
8	Rory Fitzpatrick	D	5	0	0	0	−2	4
35	Mika Noronen	G	10	0	0	0		2
10	Henrik Tallinder	D	2	0	0	0	−1	0

=== Goaltending ===
No.	Player	Regular season									
No.	Player	GP	W	L	T	SA	GA	GAA	SV%	SO	TOI
43	Martin Biron	72	31	28	10	1781	151	2.22	.915	4	4084:57
35	Mika Noronen	10	4	3	1	217	23	2.66	.894	0	518:00
31	Bob Essensa	9	0	5	0	113	17	2.91	.850	0	350:22

== Awards and records ==
=== Awards ===
Type	Award/honor	Recipient	Ref
League (in-season)	NHL All-Star Game selection	Alexei Zhitnik	
League (in-season)	NHL YoungStars Game selection	Tim Connolly	

=== Milestones ===
Milestone	Player	Date	Ref
First game	Ales Kotalik	November 12, 2001	
First game	Norm Milley	January 25, 2002	
First game	Henrik Tallinder	April 12, 2002	

== Transactions ==
The Sabres were involved in the following transactions from June 10, 2001, the day after the deciding game of the 2001 Stanley Cup Final, through June 13, 2002, the day of the deciding game of the 2002 Stanley Cup Final.

=== Trades ===
Date	Details		Ref
June 24, 2001	To Buffalo Sabres: 5th-round pick in 2001; 8th-round pick in 2001; 9th-round pick in 2001	To San Jose Sharks: 5th-round pick in 2001	
June 24, 2001	To Buffalo Sabres: Tim Connolly; Taylor Pyatt	To New York Islanders: Rights to Michael Peca	
June 30, 2001	To Buffalo Sabres: Vyacheslav Kozlov; 1st-round pick in 2002; Future considerations	To Detroit Red Wings: Dominik Hasek	
March 19, 2002	To Buffalo Sabres: Bob Corkum	To Atlanta Thrashers: 5th-round pick in 2002	

=== Players acquired ===
Date	Player	Former team	Term	Via	Ref
August 2, 2001	Christian Matte	Minnesota Wild		Free agency	
August 3, 2001	Bob Essensa	Vancouver Canucks		Free agency	
August 9, 2001	Tom Askey	Rochester Americans (AHL)		Free agency	
August 9, 2001	Mario Larocque	Tampa Bay Lightning		Free agency	
August 14, 2001	Rory Fitzpatrick	Edmonton Oilers		Free agency	

=== Players lost ===
Date	Player	New team	Via (Note: In parentheses is the player's free agency group on July 1 if applicable.)	Ref
N/A	Vladimir Tsyplakov	Ak Bars Kazan (RSL)	Free agency (III)	
July 2, 2001	Donald Audette	Dallas Stars	Free agency (III)	
July 4, 2001	Steve Heinze	Los Angeles Kings	Free agency (III)	
July 13, 2001	Dave Andreychuk	Tampa Bay Lightning	Free agency (III)	
August 23, 2001	Jason Holland	Los Angeles Kings	Free agency (VI)	
October 6, 2001	Doug Gilmour	Montreal Canadiens	Free agency (III)	

=== Signings ===
Date	Player	Term	Contract type	Ref
June 26, 2001	Stu Barnes	1-year	Option exercised	
June 26, 2001	James Patrick	1-year	Re-signing	
June 28, 2001	Richard Smehlik	1-year	Option exercised	
June 28, 2001	Vaclav Varada	1-year	Option exercised	
June 30, 2001	Dominik Hasek	1-year	Option exercised	
July 3, 2001	Rob Ray	1-year	Re-signing	
July 16, 2001	Ales Kotalik		Entry-level	
July 16, 2001	Henrik Tallinder		Entry-level	
July 23, 2001	Doug Janik		Entry-level	
July 30, 2001	Chris Taylor	multi-year	Re-signing	
July 31, 2001	Rhett Warrener	1-year	Re-signing	
August 2, 2001	Doug Houda		Re-signing	
August 8, 2001	Miroslav Satan	2-year	Arbitration award	
August 20, 2001	Eric Boulton	multi-year	Re-signing	
September 6, 2001	Jean-Pierre Dumont	3-year	Re-signing	
September 7, 2001	Denis Hamel	2-year	Re-signing	
September 11, 2001	Alexei Zhitnik	2-year (Note: Club option for a third year.)	Re-signing	
October 2, 2001	Erik Rasmussen	2-year (Note: Option for a third year.)	Re-signing	
January 15, 2002	Stu Barnes	3-year	Extension	
June 1, 2002	Paul Gaustad	3-year	Entry-level	
June 1, 2002	Sean McMorrow	3-year	Entry-level	

== Draft picks ==
Buffalo's draft picks at the 2001 NHL entry draft held at the National Car Rental Center in Sunrise, Florida.

Round	#	Player	Nationality	College/Junior/Club team (League)
1	22	Jiri Novotny	Czech Republic	HC České Budějovice (Czech Republic)
2	32	Derek Roy	Canada	Kitchener Rangers (OHL)
2	50	Chris Thorburn	Canada	North Bay Centennials (OHL)
2	55	Jason Pominville	United States	Shawinigan Cataractes (QMJHL)
5	155	Michal Vondrka	Czech Republic	HC České Budějovice (Czech Republic)
8	234	Carl Aslund	Sweden	Huddinge IK (Sweden)
8	247	Marek Dubec	Slovakia	Vsetín HC (Czech Republic)
9	279	Ryan Jorde	Canada	Tri-City Americans (WHL)

== See also ==
- 2001–02 NHL season
