= 2001–02 Chicago Blackhawks season =

National Hockey League team season

2001–02 Chicago Blackhawks
- Division: 3rd Central
- Conference: 5th Western
- 2001–02 record: 41–27–13–1
- Home record: 28–7–5–1
- Road record: 13–20–8–0
- Goals for: 216
- Goals against: 207

Team information
- General manager: Mike Smith
- Coach: Brian Sutter
- Captain: Tony Amonte
- Alternate captains: Jon Klemm; Alexei Zhamnov
- Arena: United Center
- Average attendance: 15,568 (75.9%)
- Minor league affiliates: Norfolk Admirals; Jackson Bandits

Team leaders
- Goals: Eric Daze (38)
- Assists: Michael Nylander (46)
- Points: Eric Daze (70)
- Penalty minutes: Bob Probert (176)
- Plus/minus: Michael Nylander (+28)
- Wins: Jocelyn Thibault (33)
- Goals against average: Steve Passmore (2.26)

The 2001–02 Chicago Blackhawks season was the team's 76th season of operation in the National Hockey League (NHL). Finishing fifth in the Western Conference, they qualified for the Stanley Cup playoffs for the first time since the 1996–97 season. They were eliminated in the first round of the playoffs by the St. Louis Blues. This was their only playoff appearance between 1998 and 2008.

== Regular season ==
The Blackhawks tied the Detroit Red Wings for the best home record in the league. They also allowed the fewest short-handed goals in the league during the regular season, with just two.

=== Final standings ===
Central Division
No.	CR		GP	W	L	T	OTL	GF	GA	Pts
1	1	**Detroit Red Wings**	82	51	17	10	4	251	187	116
2	4	**St. Louis Blues**	82	43	27	8	4	227	188	98
3	5	**Chicago Blackhawks**	82	41	27	13	1	216	207	96
4	14	Nashville Predators	82	28	41	13	0	196	230	69
5	15	Columbus Blue Jackets	82	22	47	8	5	164	255	57

Note: CR = Conference rank; GP = Games played; W = Wins; L = Losses; T = Ties; OTL = Overtime loss; GF = Goals for; GA = Goals against; Pts = Points
Bolded teams qualified for the playoffs.

Western Conference
R		Div	GP	W	L	T	OTL	GF	GA	Pts
**1**	**p – Detroit Red Wings**	**CEN**	**82**	**51**	**17**	**10**	**4**	**251**	**187**	**116**
**2**	**y – Colorado Avalanche**	**NW**	**82**	**45**	**28**	**8**	**1**	**212**	**169**	**99**
**3**	**y – San Jose Sharks**	**PAC**	**82**	**44**	**27**	**8**	**3**	**248**	**199**	**99**
**4**	**St. Louis Blues**	**CEN**	**82**	**43**	**27**	**8**	**4**	**227**	**188**	**98**
**5**	**Chicago Blackhawks**	**CEN**	**82**	**41**	**27**	**13**	**1**	**216**	**207**	**96**
**6**	**Phoenix Coyotes**	**PAC**	**82**	**40**	**27**	**9**	**6**	**228**	**210**	**95**
**7**	**Los Angeles Kings**	**PAC**	**82**	**40**	**27**	**11**	**4**	**214**	**190**	**95**
**8**	**Vancouver Canucks**	**NW**	**82**	**42**	**30**	**7**	**3**	**254**	**211**	**94**
8.5
9	Edmonton Oilers	NW	82	38	28	12	4	205	182	92
10	Dallas Stars	PAC	82	36	28	13	5	215	213	90
11	Calgary Flames	NW	82	32	35	12	3	201	220	79
12	Minnesota Wild	NW	82	26	35	12	9	195	238	73
13	Mighty Ducks of Anaheim	PAC	82	29	42	8	3	175	198	69
14	Nashville Predators	CEN	82	28	41	13	0	196	230	69
15	Columbus Blue Jackets	CEN	82	22	47	8	5	164	255	57

Divisions: CEN – Central, PAC – Pacific, NW – Northwest

bold – Qualified for playoffs; p – Won Presidents' Trophy; y – Won division

== Schedule and results ==
=== Regular season ===
2001–02 regular season
October: 7–3–3–0 (home: 5–0–2–0; road: 2–3–1–0)

Game	Date	Score	Opponent	Record	Recap
1	October 4, 2001	5–4	@ Vancouver Canucks (2001–02)	1–0–0–0	W
2	October 6, 2001	0–4	@ Calgary Flames (2001–02)	1–1–0–0	L
3	October 9, 2001	0–1	@ Edmonton Oilers (2001–02)	1–2–0–0	L
4	October 11, 2001	3–0	Phoenix Coyotes (2001–02)	2–2–0–0	W
5	October 12, 2001	4–6	@ Minnesota Wild (2001–02)	2–3–0–0	L
6	October 14, 2001	2–2 OT	Columbus Blue Jackets (2001–02)	2–3–1–0	T
7	October 18, 2001	5–3	@ Nashville Predators (2001–02)	3–3–1–0	W
8	October 20, 2001	2–2 OT	@ Dallas Stars (2001–02)	3–3–2–0	T
9	October 21, 2001	4–2	Colorado Avalanche (2001–02)	4–3–2–0	W
10	October 23, 2001	6–3	Calgary Flames (2001–02)	5–3–2–0	W
11	October 25, 2001	4–2	San Jose Sharks (2001–02)	6–3–2–0	W
12	October 28, 2001	3–3 OT	Boston Bruins (2001–02)	6–3–3–0	T
13	October 30, 2001	5–1	Los Angeles Kings (2001–02)	7–3–3–0	W

November: 5–5–4–0 (home: 4–1–1–0; road: 1–4–3–0)

Game	Date	Score	Opponent	Record	Recap
14	November 1, 2001	3–2	@ Los Angeles Kings (2001–02)	8–3–3–0	W
15	November 2, 2001	2–5	@ Mighty Ducks of Anaheim (2001–02)	8–4–3–0	L
16	November 4, 2001	5–4	Detroit Red Wings (2001–02)	9–4–3–0	W
17	November 6, 2001	2–1	Philadelphia Flyers (2001–02)	10–4–3–0	W
18	November 9, 2001	3–1	Vancouver Canucks (2001–02)	11–4–3–0	W
19	November 11, 2001	3–2 OT	San Jose Sharks (2001–02)	12–4–3–0	W
20	November 13, 2001	2–3	@ Vancouver Canucks (2001–02)	12–5–3–0	L
21	November 15, 2001	2–2 OT	@ Calgary Flames (2001–02)	12–5–4–0	T
22	November 16, 2001	1–7	@ Edmonton Oilers (2001–02)	12–6–4–0	L
23	November 21, 2001	3–4	@ Nashville Predators (2001–02)	12–7–4–0	L
24	November 23, 2001	2–2 OT	@ Columbus Blue Jackets (2001–02)	12–7–5–0	T
25	November 25, 2001	4–4 OT	@ Detroit Red Wings (2001–02)	12–7–6–0	T
26	November 28, 2001	3–3 OT	Vancouver Canucks (2001–02)	12–7–7–0	T
27	November 30, 2001	1–2	Toronto Maple Leafs (2001–02)	12–8–7–0	L

December: 11–4–1–0 (home: 5–2–1–0; road: 6–2–0–0)

Game	Date	Score	Opponent	Record	Recap
28	December 1, 2001	1–4	@ Toronto Maple Leafs (2001–02)	12–9–7–0	L
29	December 3, 2001	3–2	@ Montreal Canadiens (2001–02)	13–9–7–0	W
30	December 5, 2001	4–2	Minnesota Wild (2001–02)	14–9–7–0	W
31	December 7, 2001	4–3	New York Islanders (2001–02)	15–9–7–0	W
32	December 9, 2001	2–5	Los Angeles Kings (2001–02)	15–10–7–0	L
33	December 12, 2001	2–2 OT	St. Louis Blues (2001–02)	15–10–8–0	T
34	December 14, 2001	3–1	@ Atlanta Thrashers (2001–02)	16–10–8–0	W
35	December 15, 2001	2–5	@ Nashville Predators (2001–02)	16–11–8–0	L
36	December 17, 2001	2–0	@ Detroit Red Wings (2001–02)	17–11–8–0	W
37	December 19, 2001	6–5	@ Buffalo Sabres (2001–02)	18–11–8–0	W
38	December 21, 2001	5–1	Edmonton Oilers (2001–02)	19–11–8–0	W
39	December 23, 2001	0–5	Detroit Red Wings (2001–02)	19–12–8–0	L
40	December 26, 2001	3–1	@ St. Louis Blues (2001–02)	20–12–8–0	W
41	December 27, 2001	3–1	Colorado Avalanche (2001–02)	21–12–8–0	W
42	December 30, 2001	2–1	Mighty Ducks of Anaheim (2001–02)	22–12–8–0	W
43	December 31, 2001	5–4 OT	@ Ottawa Senators (2001–02)	23–12–8–0	W

January: 7–5–1–0 (home: 6–1–0–0; road: 1–4–1–0)

Game	Date	Score	Opponent	Record	Recap
44	January 4, 2002	2–0	Tampa Bay Lightning (2001–02)	24–12–8–0	W
45	January 6, 2002	2–0	Pittsburgh Penguins (2001–02)	25–12–8–0	W
46	January 9, 2002	3–7	@ Colorado Avalanche (2001–02)	25–13–8–0	L
47	January 10, 2002	2–1	Columbus Blue Jackets (2001–02)	26–13–8–0	W
48	January 12, 2002	4–5	@ Columbus Blue Jackets (2001–02)	26–14–8–0	L
49	January 14, 2002	2–1	Edmonton Oilers (2001–02)	27–14–8–0	W
50	January 16, 2002	3–0	@ Florida Panthers (2001–02)	28–14–8–0	W
51	January 18, 2002	2–2 OT	@ Tampa Bay Lightning (2001–02)	28–14–9–0	T
52	January 20, 2002	3–2	Dallas Stars (2001–02)	29–14–9–0	W
53	January 23, 2002	1–4	Phoenix Coyotes (2001–02)	29–15–9–0	L
54	January 25, 2002	2–1	St. Louis Blues (2001–02)	30–15–9–0	W
55	January 28, 2002	1–2	@ Boston Bruins (2001–02)	30–16–9–0	L
56	January 30, 2002	1–3	@ New Jersey Devils (2001–02)	30–17–9–0	L

February: 3–3–0–0 (home: 1–1–0–0; road: 2–2–0–0)

Game	Date	Score	Opponent	Record	Recap
57	February 6, 2002	5–2	@ Phoenix Coyotes (2001–02)	31–17–9–0	W
58	February 8, 2002	2–4	@ San Jose Sharks (2001–02)	31–18–9–0	L
59	February 9, 2002	3–2	@ Colorado Avalanche (2001–02)	32–18–9–0	W
60	February 13, 2002	5–4	Florida Panthers (2001–02)	33–18–9–0	W
61	February 26, 2002	4–5	@ Philadelphia Flyers (2001–02)	33–19–9–0	L
62	February 27, 2002	2–3	Montreal Canadiens (2001–02)	33–20–9–0	L

March: 6–3–3–1 (home: 5–1–1–1; road: 1–2–2–0)

Game	Date	Score	Opponent	Record	Recap
63	March 3, 2002	2–1	Mighty Ducks of Anaheim (2001–02)	34–20–9–0	W
64	March 5, 2002	1–2 OT	Carolina Hurricanes (2001–02)	34–20–9–1	OTL
65	March 7, 2002	5–1	New York Rangers (2001–02)	35–20–9–1	W
66	March 11, 2002	1–2	@ Los Angeles Kings (2001–02)	35–21–9–1	L
67	March 12, 2002	1–3	@ Phoenix Coyotes (2001–02)	35–22–9–1	L
68	March 15, 2002	1–1 OT	@ Mighty Ducks of Anaheim (2001–02)	35–22–10–1	T
69	March 16, 2002	2–2 OT	@ San Jose Sharks (2001–02)	35–22–11–1	T
70	March 18, 2002	2–2 OT	Dallas Stars (2001–02)	35–22–12–1	T
71	March 20, 2002	1–3	New Jersey Devils (2001–02)	35–23–12–1	L
72	March 24, 2002	4–3 OT	St. Louis Blues (2001–02)	36–23–12–1	W
73	March 27, 2002	4–1	Nashville Predators (2001–02)	37–23–12–1	W
74	March 29, 2002	3–1	@ Minnesota Wild (2001–02)	38–23–12–1	W
75	March 31, 2002	2–1	Minnesota Wild (2001–02)	39–23–12–1	W

April: 2–4–1–0 (home: 2–1–0–0; road: 0–3–1–0)

Game	Date	Score	Opponent	Record	Recap
76	April 3, 2002	1–3	Nashville Predators (2001–02)	39–24–12–1	L
77	April 5, 2002	1–5	@ St. Louis Blues (2001–02)	39–25–12–1	L
78	April 7, 2002	3–2	Calgary Flames (2001–02)	40–25–12–1	W
79	April 9, 2002	1–3	@ Washington Capitals (2001–02)	40–26–12–1	L
80	April 10, 2002	3–3 OT	@ Detroit Red Wings (2001–02)	40–26–13–1	T
81	April 12, 2002	1–3	@ Dallas Stars (2001–02)	40–27–13–1	L
82	April 14, 2002	2–0	Columbus Blue Jackets (2001–02)	41–27–13–1	W

Legend: W Win (2 points) L Loss (0 points) T Tie (1 point) OTL Overtime loss (1 point)

=== Playoffs ===
2002 Stanley Cup playoffs
Western Conference Quarterfinals vs. (4) St. Louis Blues – Blues win 4–1

Game	Date	Score	Opponent	Series	Recap
1	April 18, 2002	2–1	@ St. Louis Blues	Blackhawks lead 1–0	W
2	April 20, 2002	0–2	@ St. Louis Blues	Series tied 1–1	L
3	April 21, 2002	0–4	St. Louis Blues	Blues lead 2–1	L
4	April 23, 2002	0–1	St. Louis Blues	Blues lead 3–1	L
5	April 25, 2002	3–5	@ St. Louis Blues	Blues win 4–1	L

Legend: W Win L Loss

== Player statistics ==
=== Scoring ===
- Position abbreviations: C = Center; D = Defense; G = Goaltender; LW = Left wing; RW = Right wing
- † = Joined team via a transaction (e.g., trade, waivers, signing) during the season. Stats reflect time with the Blackhawks only.
- ‡ = Left team via a transaction (e.g., trade, waivers, release) during the season. Stats reflect time with the Blackhawks only.

No.	Player	Pos	Regular season						Playoffs					
No.	Player	Pos	GP	G	A	Pts	+/-	PIM	GP	G	A	Pts	+/-	PIM
55	Eric Daze	RW	82	38	32	70	17	36	5	0	0	0	−2	2
13	Alex Zhamnov	C	77	22	45	67	8	67	5	0	0	0	−1	0
10	Tony Amonte	RW	82	27	39	66	11	67	5	0	1	1	1	4
92	Michael Nylander	C	82	15	46	61	28	50	5	0	3	3	2	2
26	Steve Sullivan	RW	78	21	39	60	23	67	5	1	0	1	−1	2
19	Kyle Calder	LW	81	17	36	53	8	47	5	2	0	2	0	2
6	Phil Housley	D	80	15	24	39	−3	34	5	0	1	1	−1	4
22	Igor Korolev	C	82	9	20	29	−5	20	5	0	1	1	−3	0
28	Mark Bell	C	80	12	16	28	−6	124	5	0	0	0	−2	8
42	Jon Klemm	D	82	4	16	20	−3	42	5	0	1	1	0	4
2	Boris Mironov	D	64	4	14	18	15	68	1	0	0	0	0	2
32	Steve Thomas	LW	34	11	4	15	0	17	5	1	1	2	−3	0
3	Jaroslav Spacek‡	D	60	3	10	13	5	29	—	—	—	—	—	—
25	Alexander Karpovtsev	D	65	1	9	10	10	40	5	1	0	1	−1	0
8	Steve Poapst	D	56	1	7	8	6	30	5	0	0	0	−2	0
17	Mike Peluso	RW	37	4	2	6	−3	19	—	—	—	—	—	—
11	Peter White	C	48	3	3	6	−8	10	—	—	—	—	—	—
39	Tyler Arnason	C	21	3	1	4	−3	4	3	0	0	0	−1	0
12 (Note: Fitzgerald wore number 20 in his first three games.)	Tom Fitzgerald†	RW	15	1	3	4	−3	6	5	0	0	0	−2	4
24	Bob Probert	LW	61	1	3	4	−9	176	2	0	0	0	0	0
14	Ryan VandenBussche	RW	50	1	2	3	−10	103	1	0	0	0	0	0
4	Chris McAlpine	D	40	0	3	3	8	36	1	0	0	0	0	0
15	Jim Campbell†	RW	9	1	1	2	−3	4	—	—	—	—	—	—
45	Vladimir Chebaturkin	D	13	0	2	2	0	6	3	0	0	0	−2	2
7	Lyle Odelein†	D	12	0	2	2	0	4	4	0	1	1	−1	25
23	Joe Reekie†	D	17	0	2	2	2	28	1	0	0	0	0	2
15	Pascal Rheaume‡	C	19	0	2	2	−1	4	—	—	—	—	—	—
44	Aaron Downey	RW	36	1	0	1	−2	76	4	0	0	0	−1	8
16	Steve Dubinsky‡	C	3	1	0	1	1	4	—	—	—	—	—	—
16	Matt Henderson	RW	4	0	1	1	−1	0	—	—	—	—	—	—
29	Steve Passmore	G	23	0	1	1		2	3	0	0	0		0
20	Casey Hankinson	LW	3	0	0	0	−2	0	—	—	—	—	—	—
5	Steve McCarthy	D	3	0	0	0	−1	2	—	—	—	—	—	—
41	Jocelyn Thibault	G	67	0	0	0		2	3	0	0	0		0

=== Goaltending ===
No.	Player	Regular season										Playoffs								
No.	Player	GP	W	L	T	SA	GA	GAA	SV%	SO	TOI	GP	W	L	SA	GA	GAA	SV%	SO	TOI
41	Jocelyn Thibault	67	33	23	9	1626	159	2.49	.902	6	3838	3	1	2	77	7	2.64	.909	0	159
29	Steve Passmore	23	8	5	4	446	43	2.26	.904	0	1142	3	0	2	62	6	2.61	.903	0	138

== Awards and records ==
=== Awards ===
Type	Award/honor	Recipient	Ref
League (in-season)	NHL All-Star Game selection	Eric Daze	
League (in-season)	NHL All-Star Game selection	Brian Sutter (coach)	
League (in-season)	NHL All-Star Game selection	Alexei Zhamnov	
League (in-season)	NHL Player of the Month	Steve Sullivan (December)	
League (in-season)	NHL Player of the Week	Jocelyn Thibault (November 12)	
League (in-season)	NHL YoungStars Game selection	Kyle Calder	

=== Milestones ===
Milestone	Player	Date	Ref
First game	Mike Peluso	November 21, 2001	
First game	Tyler Arnason	February 13, 2002	
25th shutout	Jocelyn Thibault	January 6, 2002	

== Transactions ==
The Blackhawks were involved in the following transactions from June 10, 2001, the day after the deciding game of the 2001 Stanley Cup Final, through June 13, 2002, the day of the deciding game of the 2002 Stanley Cup Final.

=== Trades ===
Date	Details		Ref
June 23, 2001	To Chicago Blackhawks: 4th-round pick in 2001	To Montreal Canadiens: Stephane Quintal	
June 23, 2001	To Chicago Blackhawks: Igor Korolev	To Toronto Maple Leafs: Philadelphia’s 3rd-round pick in 2001	
June 24, 2001	To Chicago Blackhawks: 4th-round pick in 2001; 6th-round pick in 2001; 7th-round pick in 2001	To San Jose Sharks: 4th-round pick in 2001	
September 30, 2001	To Chicago Blackhawks: Rights to Shawn Thornton	To Toronto Maple Leafs: Marty Wilford	
October 9, 2001	To Chicago Blackhawks: Future considerations	To Nashville Predators: Nathan Perrott	
January 17, 2002	To Chicago Blackhawks: Joe Reekie	To Washington Capitals: 4th-round pick in 2002	
February 6, 2002	To Chicago Blackhawks: Future considerations	To Nashville Predators: Steve Dubinsky	
March 13, 2002	To Chicago Blackhawks: Tom Fitzgerald	To Nashville Predators: 4th-round pick in 2003; Future considerations	
March 19, 2002	To Chicago Blackhawks: Lyle Odelein	To Columbus Blue Jackets: Jaroslav Spacek; 2nd-round pick in 2003	

=== Players acquired ===
Date	Player	Former team	Term	Via	Ref
July 1, 2001	Jon Klemm	Colorado Avalanche		Free agency	
July 18, 2001	Steve Thomas	Toronto Maple Leafs		Free agency	
July 31, 2001	Pascal Rheaume	St. Louis Blues		Free agency	
August 1, 2001	Ajay Baines	Norfolk Admirals (AHL)		Free agency	
August 1, 2001	Mike Peluso	St. Louis Blues		Free agency	
August 7, 2001	Rumun Ndur	Atlanta Thrashers		Free agency	
September 5, 2001	Vladimir Chebaturkin	St. Louis Blues		Free agency	
September 10, 2001	Peter White	Philadelphia Flyers		Free agency	
September 28, 2001	Phil Housley	Calgary Flames		Waiver draft	
November 19, 2001	Jim Campbell	Norfolk Admirals (AHL)		Free agency	
May 22, 2002	Johnathan Aitken	Norfolk Admirals (AHL)		Free agency	

=== Players lost ===
Date	Player	New team	Via (Note: In parentheses is the player's free agency group on July 1 if applicable.)	Ref
June 13, 2001	Josef Marha	HC Davos (NLA)	Free agency (II) (Note: Chicago retained Marha’s NHL rights.)	
July 1, 2001	Blair Atcheynum (Note: Atcheynum retired.)		Contract expiration (UFA)	
July 1, 2001	Mark Janssens (Note: Janssens retired.)		Contract expiration (III)	
July 1, 2001	Michel Larocque (Note: Larocque retired.)		Contract expiration (UFA)	
July 13, 2001	Chris Herperger	Ottawa Senators	Free agency (VI)	
July 23, 2001	Jeff Maund	Boston Bruins	Free agency (UFA)	
August 8, 2001	Jeff Paul	Colorado Avalanche	Free agency (UFA)	
August 14, 2001	Rob Tallas	Pittsburgh Penguins	Free agency (UFA)	
September 12, 2001	Erasmo Saltarelli	B.C. Icemen (UHL)	Free agency (UFA)	
September 28, 2001	Jamie Allison	Calgary Flames	Waiver draft	
N/A	Geoff Peters	Hamilton Bulldogs (AHL)	Free agency (UFA)	
October 6, 2001	Reto von Arx	HC Davos (NLA)	Free agency (II) (Note: Chicago retained von Arx’s NHL rights.)	
November 14, 2001	Pascal Rheaume	Atlanta Thrashers	Waivers	

=== Signings ===
Date	Player	Term	Contract type	Ref
June 14, 2001	Steve Poapst		Re-signing	
July 5, 2001	Chris McAlpine		Re-signing	
July 5, 2001	Alexei Zhamnov		Re-signing	
July 16, 2001	Mikhail Yakubov		Entry-level	
July 17, 2001	Bob Probert		Re-signing	
July 17, 2001	Jaroslav Spacek		Re-signing	
July 19, 2001	Jocelyn Thibault		Re-signing	
July 31, 2001	Jean-Yves Leroux		Re-signing	
August 2, 2001	Eric Daze		Re-signing	
August 7, 2001	Nolan Baumgartner		Re-signing	
August 7, 2001	Steve Dubinsky		Re-signing	
August 7, 2001	Casey Hankinson		Re-signing	
August 11, 2001	Jamie Allison		Re-signing	
August 13, 2001	Craig Anderson	multi-year	Entry-level	
August 22, 2001	Igor Korolev		Re-signing	
September 5, 2001	Kent Huskins		Entry-level	
September 6, 2001	Tyler Arnason		Entry-level	
April 29, 2002	Ryan VandenBussche	multi-year	Extension	
May 8, 2002	Scott Balan		Entry-level	
May 8, 2002	Igor Radulov		Entry-level	
May 8, 2002	Yorick Treille		Entry-level	
May 29, 2002	Mike Peluso	1-year	Option exercised	
May 31, 2002	Matt Henderson		Extension	

== Draft picks ==
Chicago's draft picks at the 2001 NHL entry draft held at the National Car Rental Center in Sunrise, Florida.

Round	#	Player	Nationality	College/Junior/Club team (League)
1	9	Tuomo Ruutu	Finland	Jokerit (Finland)
1	29	Adam Munro	Canada	Erie Otters (OHL)
2	59	Matt Keith	Canada	Spokane Chiefs (WHL)
3	73	Craig Anderson	United States	Guelph Storm (OHL)
4	104	Brent MacLellan	Canada	Rimouski Oceanic (QMJHL)
4	115	Vladimir Gusev	Russia	Khabarovsk (Russia)
4	119	Alexei Zotkin	Russia	Metallurg Magnitogorsk (Russia)
5	142	Tommi Jaminki	Finland	Blues (Finland)
6	174	Alexander Golovin	Russia	Avangard Omsk-2 (Russia)
6	186	Petr Puncochar	Czech Republic	HC Energie Karlovy Vary (Czech Republic)
7	205	Teemu Jaaskelainen	Finland	Ilves Jr. (Finland)
7	216	Oleg Minakov	Canada	Kristall Elektrostal (Russia)
9	268	Jeff Miles	Canada	University of Vermont (ECAC)

== See also ==
- 2001–02 NHL season
