= Reid Simpson =

Canadian ice hockey player

- Born: May 21, 1969 (age 56) Flin Flon, Manitoba, Canada
- Height: 6 ft 1 in (185 cm)
- Weight: 210 lb (95 kg; 15 st 0 lb)
- Position: Left wing
- Shot: Left
- Played for: Philadelphia Flyers; Minnesota North Stars; New Jersey Devils; Chicago Blackhawks; Tampa Bay Lightning; St. Louis Blues; Montreal Canadiens; Nashville Predators; Pittsburgh Penguins
- NHL draft: 72nd overall, 1989; Philadelphia Flyers
- Playing career: 1990–2007

Reid Philip Simpson (born May 21, 1969) is a Canadian former professional ice hockey left winger who played twelve seasons in the National Hockey League (NHL) for the Philadelphia Flyers, Minnesota North Stars, New Jersey Devils, Chicago Blackhawks, Tampa Bay Lightning, St. Louis Blues, Montreal Canadiens, Nashville Predators and Pittsburgh Penguins. Simpson was recently featured in the book "Warriors on the Ice: Hockey's Toughest Talk." In it, Simpson spoke about his epic fights with Joey Kocur, Bob Probert, and Stu Grimson. He is currently a professional scout with the Montreal Canadiens.

== Playing career ==
Simpson was drafted 72nd overall by the Flyers in the 1989 NHL entry draft and went on to play in 301 regular season games, notching up 18 goals and 18 assists for 36 points, racking up 838 penalty minutes in the process. He won a Calder Cup with the Albany River Rats in 1995. The veteran attempted a comeback during the 2009–10 season in the American Hockey League for the Chicago Wolves. Simpson played 14 games for the Wolves. Before his return he had spent from 2005 until 2007 playing in the Russian Super League.

== Career statistics ==
=== Regular season and playoffs ===
			Regular season					Playoffs
Season	Team	League	GP	G	A	Pts	PIM	GP	G	A	Pts	PIM
1985–86	New Westminster Bruins	WHL	2	0	0	0	0	—	—	—	—	—
1986–87	Prince Albert Raiders	WHL	47	3	8	11	105	8	2	3	5	13
1987–88	Prince Albert Raiders	WHL	72	13	14	27	164	10	1	0	1	43
1988–89	Prince Albert Raiders	WHL	59	26	29	55	264	4	2	1	3	30
1989–90	Prince Albert Raiders	WHL	29	15	17	32	121	14	4	7	11	34
1989–90	Hershey Bears	AHL	28	2	2	4	175	—	—	—	—	—
1990–91	Hershey Bears	AHL	54	9	15	24	183	1	0	0	0	0
1991–92	Hershey Bears	AHL	60	11	7	18	145	—	—	—	—	—
1991–92	Philadelphia Flyers	NHL	1	0	0	0	0	—	—	—	—	—
1992–93	Kalamazoo Wings	IHL	45	5	5	10	193	—	—	—	—	—
1992–93	Minnesota North Stars	NHL	1	0	0	0	5	—	—	—	—	—
1993–94	Kalamazoo Wings	IHL	5	0	0	0	16	—	—	—	—	—
1993–94	Albany River Rats	AHL	37	9	5	14	135	5	1	1	2	18
1994–95	Albany River Rats	AHL	70	18	25	43	268	14	1	8	9	13
1994–95	New Jersey Devils	NHL	9	0	0	0	27	—	—	—	—	—
1995–96	Albany River Rats	AHL	6	1	3	4	17	—	—	—	—	—
1995–96	New Jersey Devils	NHL	23	1	5	6	79	—	—	—	—	—
1996–97	Albany River Rats	AHL	3	0	0	0	10	—	—	—	—	—
1996–97	New Jersey Devils	NHL	27	0	4	4	60	5	0	0	0	29
1997–98	New Jersey Devils	NHL	6	0	0	0	16	—	—	—	—	—
1997–98	Chicago Blackhawks	NHL	38	3	2	5	102	—	—	—	—	—
1998–99	Chicago Blackhawks	NHL	53	5	4	9	145	—	—	—	—	—
1999–00	Cleveland Lumberjacks	IHL	12	2	2	4	56	—	—	—	—	—
1999–00	Tampa Bay Lightning	NHL	26	1	0	1	103	—	—	—	—	—
2000–01	St. Louis Blues	NHL	38	2	1	3	96	5	0	0	0	2
2001–02	Montreal Canadiens	NHL	25	1	1	2	63	—	—	—	—	—
2001–02	Milwaukee Admirals	AHL	2	1	0	1	37	—	—	—	—	—
2001–02	Nashville Predators	NHL	26	5	0	5	69	—	—	—	—	—
2002–03	Milwaukee Admirals	AHL	17	6	6	12	40	—	—	—	—	—
2002–03	Nashville Predators	NHL	26	0	1	1	56	—	—	—	—	—
2003–04	Wilkes-Barre/Scranton Penguins	AHL	51	6	11	17	168	2	0	0	0	0
2003–04	Pittsburgh Penguins	NHL	2	0	0	0	17	—	—	—	—	—
2004–05	Rockford IceHogs	UHL	15	1	3	4	46	7	0	0	0	18
2005–06	HC Vityaz	RSL	41	0	3	3	275	—	—	—	—	—
2006–07	HC Vityaz	RSL	36	3	7	10	231	2	0	0	0	25
2009–10	Chicago Wolves	AHL	14	0	2	2	35	—	—	—	—	—
NHL totals			301	18	18	36	838	10	0	0	0	31
