= Jean-François Fortin (ice hockey) =

Canadian ice hockey player (born 1979)

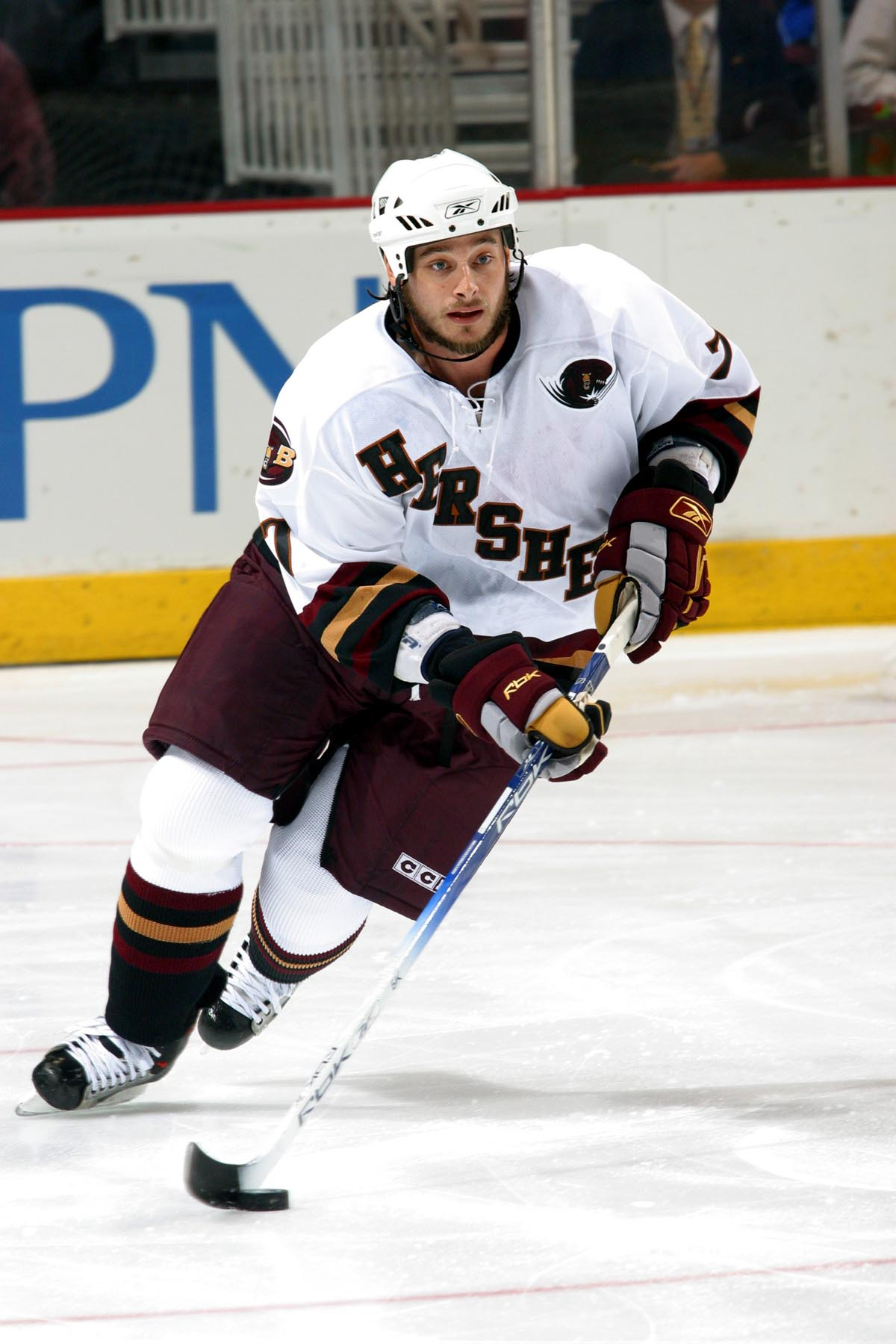
- Fortin with the Hershey Bears in 2005
- Born: March 15, 1979 (age 47) Laval, Quebec, Canada
- Height: 6 ft 2 in (188 cm)
- Weight: 200 lb (91 kg; 14 st 4 lb)
- Position: Defence
- Shot: Right
- Played for: Washington Capitals
- NHL draft: 35th overall, 1997; Washington Capitals
- Playing career: 1999–2010

Jean-François Fortin (born March 15, 1979) is a Canadian former professional ice hockey defenceman.

== Early life ==
Fortin was born in Laval, Quebec. As a youth, he played in the 1993 Quebec International Pee-Wee Hockey Tournament with a minor ice hockey team from the Mille-Îles area of Laval.

== Career ==
Fortin was drafted in the second round, 35th overall, by the Washington Capitals in the 1997 NHL entry draft. After playing four seasons in the Quebec Major Junior Hockey League with the Sherbrooke Faucons/Beavers, Fortin joined the Capitals' farm system with the ECHL's Hampton Roads Admirals and AHL's Portland Pirates in the 1999–2000 season.

Fortin made his NHL debut with the Capitals during the 2001–02. He has appeared in 71 NHL games with the Capitals during parts of three seasons, scoring one goal and adding four assists.

Fortin moved to Germany's Deutsche Eishockey Liga in 2006, playing for the Füchse Duisburg. He then moved to the Wolfsburg Grizzy Adams in 2007. For 2008-09, Fortin signed with HC MVD of the new Kontinental Hockey League, which replaced the Russian Super League but played just 4 games before returning to the DEL on 6 November 2008, moving to the Krefeld Pinguine. In 2009, he signed with EC VSV in the Austrian Hockey League. On March 12, 2010, Fortin announced his retirement.

== Career statistics ==
			Regular season					Playoffs
Season	Team	League	GP	G	A	Pts	PIM	GP	G	A	Pts	PIM
1993–94	Laval Regents	QMAAA	31	8	20	28	32	—	—	—	—	—
1994–95	Abitibi-Témiscamingue Forestiers	QMAAA	44	2	12	14	34	10	2	2	4	—
1995–96	Sherbrooke Faucons	QMJHL	69	7	15	22	40	7	2	6	8	2
1996–97	Sherbrooke Faucons	QMJHL	59	7	30	37	89	2	0	1	1	14
1997–98	Sherbrooke Faucons	QMJHL	55	12	25	37	37	—	—	—	—	—
1998–99	Sherbrooke Castors	QMJHL	64	17	33	50	78	12	5	13	18	20
1999–00	Hampton Roads Admirals	ECHL	7	0	2	2	0	—	—	—	—	—
1999–00	Portland Pirates	AHL	43	3	5	8	44	2	0	0	0	0
2000–01	Richmond Renegades	ECHL	15	0	4	4	2	—	—	—	—	—
2000–01	Portland Pirates	AHL	32	1	7	8	22	1	0	0	0	0
2001–02	Portland Pirates	AHL	44	4	9	13	20	—	—	—	—	—
2001–02	Washington Capitals	NHL	36	1	3	4	20	—	—	—	—	—
2002–03	Portland Pirates	AHL	10	2	1	3	17	—	—	—	—	—
2002–03	Washington Capitals	NHL	33	0	1	1	22	—	—	—	—	—
2003–04	Portland Pirates	AHL	4	0	1	1	6	—	—	—	—	—
2003–04	Washington Capitals	NHL	2	0	0	0	0	—	—	—	—	—
2004–05	Portland Pirates	AHL	39	1	7	8	50	—	—	—	—	—
2005–06	Hershey Bears	AHL	37	6	12	18	90	5	0	1	1	4
2006–07	Füchse Duisburg	DEL	44	3	18	21	145	—	—	—	—	—
2007–08	Grizzly Adams Wolfsburg	DEL	44	3	23	26	62	—	—	—	—	—
2008–09	HK MVD	KHL	4	0	0	0	8	—	—	—	—	—
2008–09	Krefeld Pinguine	DEL	33	2	5	7	42	7	0	5	5	12
2009–10	Villacher SV	EBEL	23	5	10	15	38	—	—	—	—	—
NHL totals			71	1	4	5	42	—	—	—	—	—
AHL totals			209	17	42	59	249	8	0	1	1	4
