= Andrei Posnov =

Russian ice hockey player

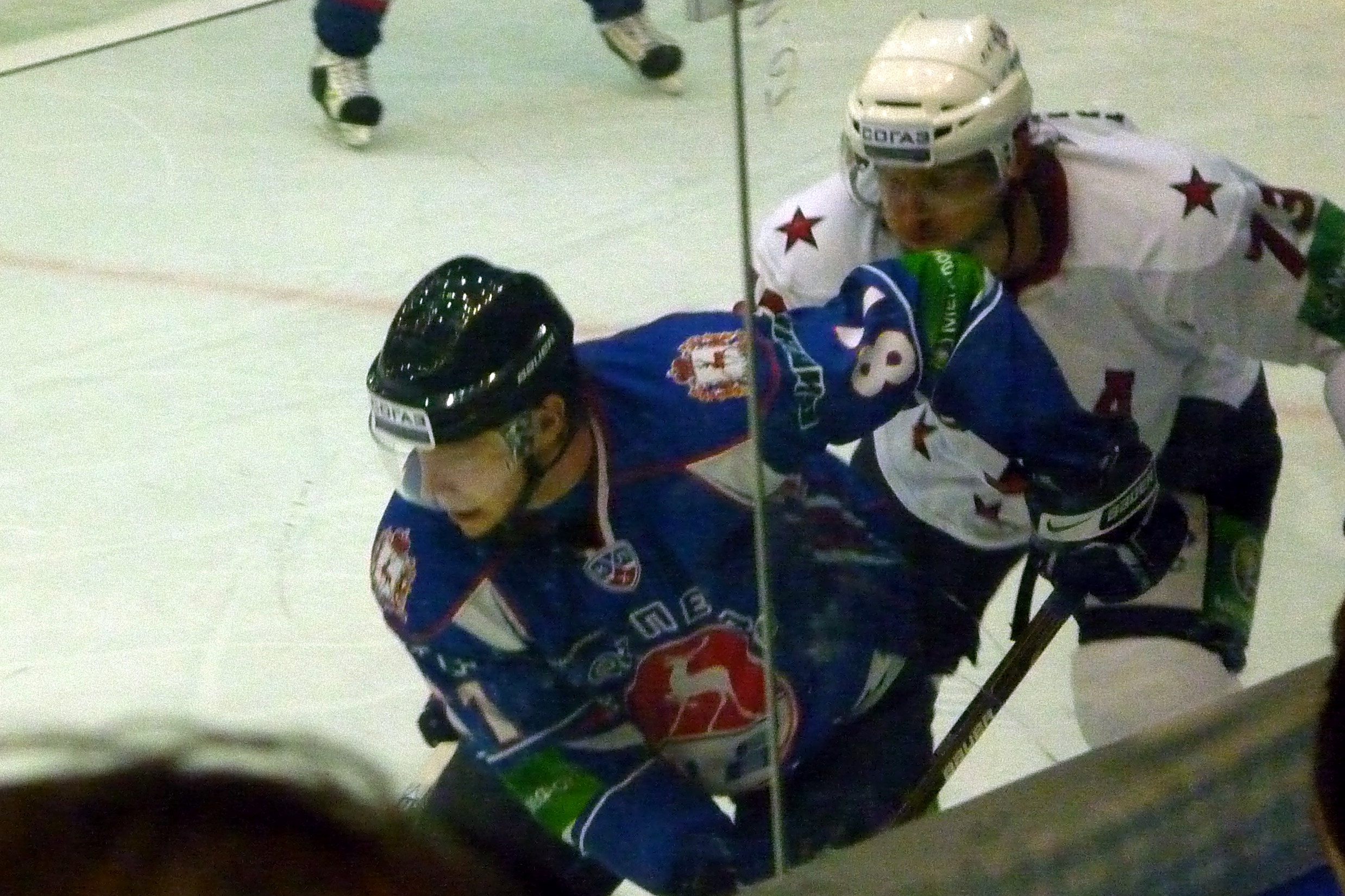
- Andrei Posnov during the game against SKA St.-Petersburg on Dec. 12, 2010
- Born: 19 November 1981 (age 44) Vorkuta, RUS
- Height: 5 ft 11 in (180 cm)
- Weight: 185 lb (84 kg; 13 st 3 lb)
- Position: Left wing
- Shot: Right
- KHL team Former teams: Vityaz Chekhov; Krylya Sovetov Moscow; HC Spartak Moscow; HC Neftekhimik Nizhnekamsk; SKA St. Petersburg; HC Sibir Novosibirsk; Atlant Moscow Oblast; Torpedo Nizhny Novgorod
- NHL draft: 128th overall, 2001; New Jersey Devils
- Playing career: 1999–2015

Andrei Posnov (born 19 November 1981) is a professional ice hockey player who is currently playing for Vityaz Chekhov in the Kontinental Hockey League (KHL). He was selected by New Jersey Devils in the 4th round (128th overall) of the 2001 NHL entry draft.

== Career statistics ==
| | | | Regular season | | | | | Playoffs |
| Season | Team | League | GP | G | A | Pts | PIM | GP | G | A | Pts | PIM |
|---|---|---|---|---|---|---|---|---|---|---|---|---|
| 1998–99 | Spartak–2 Moscow | RUS.3 | 8 | 3 | 1 | 4 | 8 | — | — | — | — | — |
| 1999–2000 | Krylia Sovetov–2 Moscow | RUS.3 | 26 | 7 | 8 | 15 | 52 | — | — | — | — | — |
| 1999–2000 | Titan Klin | RUS.4 | 10 | 3 | 3 | 6 | 12 | — | — | — | — | — |
| 2000–01 | Krylia Sovetov Moscow | RUS.2 | 11 | 0 | 4 | 4 | 4 | 2 | 0 | 1 | 1 | 0 |
| 2000–01 | Krylia Sovetov–2 Moscow | RUS.3 | 29 | 25 | 25 | 50 | 106 | — | — | — | — | — |
| 2001–02 | Krylia Sovetov Moscow | RSL | 49 | 12 | 5 | 17 | 99 | 3 | 0 | 0 | 0 | 22 |
| 2001–02 | Krylia Sovetov–2 Moscow | RUS.3 | 7 | 4 | 5 | 9 | 12 | — | — | — | — | — |
| 2002–03 | Spartak Moscow | RSL | 36 | 4 | 7 | 11 | 101 | — | — | — | — | — |
| 2003–04 | Spartak Moscow | RUS.2 | 53 | 16 | 15 | 31 | 52 | 13 | 3 | 3 | 6 | 10 |
| 2003–04 | Spartak–2 Moscow | RUS.3 | 5 | 4 | 1 | 5 | 34 | — | — | — | — | — |
| 2004–05 | Neftekhimik Nizhnekamsk | RSL | 33 | 4 | 3 | 7 | 52 | 2 | 0 | 0 | 0 | 2 |
| 2004–05 | Neftekhimik–2 Nizhnekamsk | RUS.3 | 6 | 7 | 3 | 10 | 6 | — | — | — | — | — |
| 2005–06 | Neftekhimik Nizhnekamsk | RSL | 31 | 3 | 2 | 5 | 46 | — | — | — | — | — |
| 2005–06 | Neftekhimik–2 Nizhnekamsk | RUS.3 | 1 | 1 | 1 | 2 | 0 | — | — | — | — | — |
| 2005–06 | SKA St. Petersburg | RSL | 14 | 2 | 2 | 4 | 8 | 2 | 0 | 0 | 0 | 30 |
| 2005–06 | SKA–2 St. Petersburg | RUS.3 | 2 | 4 | 4 | 8 | 0 | — | — | — | — | — |
| 2006–07 | Sibir Novosibirsk | RSL | 51 | 10 | 4 | 14 | 70 | 7 | 0 | 2 | 2 | 16 |
| 2007–08 | Sibir Novosibirsk | RSL | 40 | 2 | 9 | 11 | 66 | — | — | — | — | — |
| 2007–08 | Sibir–2 Novosibirsk | RUS.3 | 2 | 2 | 2 | 4 | 0 | — | — | — | — | — |
| 2008–09 | Sibir Novosibirsk | KHL | 39 | 10 | 8 | 18 | 59 | — | — | — | — | — |
| 2009–10 | Atlant Moscow Oblast | KHL | 48 | 4 | 8 | 12 | 20 | 4 | 0 | 0 | 0 | 4 |
| 2010–11 | Torpedo Nizhny Novgorod | KHL | 29 | 0 | 2 | 2 | 8 | — | — | — | — | — |
| 2011–12 | HC Vityaz | KHL | 41 | 4 | 2 | 6 | 62 | — | — | — | — | — |
| 2012–13 | HC Vityaz | KHL | 4 | 0 | 0 | 0 | 2 | — | — | — | — | — |
| 2012–13 | Buran Voronezh | VHL | 9 | 2 | 1 | 3 | 12 | 16 | 5 | 3 | 8 | 34 |
| 2013–14 | Buran Voronezh | VHL | 37 | 9 | 8 | 17 | 57 | 7 | 2 | 0 | 2 | 49 |
| 2014–15 | Buran Voronezh | VHL | 22 | 4 | 4 | 8 | 48 | — | — | — | — | — |
| 2014–15 | Yuzhny Ural Orsk | VHL | 10 | 2 | 4 | 6 | 9 | — | — | — | — | — |
| RUS.2 & VHL totals | | | 142 | 33 | 36 | 69 | 182 | 38 | 10 | 7 | 17 | 93 |
| RSL totals | | | 254 | 37 | 32 | 69 | 442 | 14 | 0 | 2 | 2 | 70 |
| KHL totals | | | 161 | 18 | 20 | 38 | 151 | 4 | 0 | 0 | 0 | 4 |
