= Kimmo =

- Gender: Masculine
- Language: Finnish

Kimmo is a Finnish given name for males. Notable people with the name include:

- Kimmo Kapanen (born 1974), Finnish professional ice hockey goaltender
- Kimmo Kiljunen (born 1951), member of the Finnish parliament
- Kimmo Kinnunen (born 1968), former Finnish javelin thrower
- Kimmo Koskenniemi, inventor of two-level models for computational phonology and morphology
- Kimmo Kuhta (born 1975), Finnish professional ice hockey forward
- Kimmo Leinonen (born 1949), Finnish ice hockey executive and writer
- Kimmo Lotvonen (born 1976), defenceman for the Timrå IK hockey team
- Kimmo Pohjonen (born 1964), Finnish accordionist
- Kimmo Sasi (1952–2025), Finnish politician and lawyer
- Kimmo Tauriainen (1972–2025), Finnish footballer
- Kimmo Timonen (born 1975), professional ice hockey defenceman
- Kimmo Wilska (born 1956), Finnish journalist
