= 1996 World Junior Ice Hockey Championships =

1996 IIHF World Junior Championship

Tournament details
- Host country: United States
- Venue(s): 7 (in 6 host cities)
- Dates: December 26, 1995 – January 4, 1996
- Teams: 10

Final positions
- Champions: Canada (9th title)
- Runners-up: Sweden
- Third place: Russia
- Fourth place: Czech Republic

Tournament statistics
- Games played: 31
- Goals scored: 218 (7.03 per game)
- Scoring leader(s): (Canada) Jarome Iginla (12 points)

The 1996 World Junior Ice Hockey Championships (1996 WJHC) was the 20th edition of the Ice Hockey World Junior Championship, hosted in Massachusetts, United States. The tournament was won by Canada—defeating Sweden 4–1 in the gold-medal game—earning Canada their fourth straight gold medal and ninth overall, tying the Soviet team's record in both regards.

Attendance was less than spectacular for the championships in the United States. It would be the last time the US would host the tournament until 2005 in Grand Forks.

Among this edition of the tournament's future NHL stars were Milan Hejduk, Miikka Kiprusoff, Chris Drury, Marco Sturm, José Théodore, Mattias Öhlund, Daymond Langkow, Sergei Samsonov and tournament scoring leader Jarome Iginla.

This was the first World Juniors tournament to implement the two groups, round-robin/preliminaries and playoff format. It was also Slovakia's first appearance at the top level in the junior tournament.

== Round robin ==
=== Group A ===
Team	Pld	W	L	D	GF	GA	GD	Pts
Canada	4	4	0	0	19	4	+15	8
United States	4	2	2	0	13	17	−4	4
Finland	4	2	2	0	14	10	+4	4
Switzerland	4	1	3	0	10	14	−4	2
Ukraine	4	1	3	0	9	20	−11	2

Source: Hockey Canada

December 26, 1995	Canada	6–1	United States	Centrum in Worcester, Worcester

December 26, 1995	Finland	5–1	Switzerland	New England Sports Center, Marlborough

December 27, 1995	Canada	2–1	Switzerland	Mullins Center, Amherst

December 27, 1995	Ukraine	4–3	United States	Matthews Arena, Boston

December 28, 1995	Finland	4–1	Ukraine	Matthews Arena, Boston

December 29, 1995	Canada	3–1	Finland	Matthews Arena, Boston

December 29, 1995	United States	4–3	Switzerland	Springfield Civic Center, Springfield

December 30, 1995	Switzerland	5–3	Ukraine	New England Sports Center, Marlborough

December 31, 1995	Canada	8–1	Ukraine	Matthews Arena, Boston

December 31, 1995	United States	5–4	Finland	Mullins Center, Amherst

=== Group B ===
Team	Pld	W	L	D	GF	GA	GD	Pts
Czech Republic	4	2	0	2	15	10	+5	6
Russia	4	2	1	1	19	12	+7	5
Sweden	4	2	1	1	14	7	+7	5
Slovakia	4	0	1	3	11	17	−6	3
Germany	4	0	3	1	11	24	−13	1

Source: Hockey Canada

December 26, 1995	Czech Republic	5–3	Russia	Mullins Center, Amherst

December 26, 1995	Sweden	6–0	Slovakia	Centrum in Worcester, Worcester

December 27, 1995	Slovakia	3–3	Russia	Matthews Arena, Boston

December 27, 1995	Czech Republic	6–3	Germany	Mullins Center, Amherst

December 28, 1995	Sweden	6–2	Germany	Matthews Arena, Boston

December 29, 1995	Czech Republic	4–4	Slovakia	Matthews Arena, Boston

December 29, 1995	Russia	5–2	Sweden	Springfield Civic Center, Springfield

December 30, 1995	Germany	4–4	Slovakia	New England Sports Center, Marlborough

December 31, 1995	Czech Republic	0–0	Sweden	Matthews Arena, Boston

December 31, 1995	Russia	8–2	Germany	Mullins Center, Amherst

== Relegation round ==
Team	Pld	W	L	D	GF	GA	GD	Pts
Slovakia	3	2	0	1	17	10	+7	5
Germany	3	1	0	2	12	7	+5	4
Switzerland	3	1	1	1	11	13	−2	3
Ukraine	3	0	3	0	6	16	−10	0

Source: Hockey Canada

December 30, 1995	Switzerland	5–3	Ukraine	New England Sports Center, Marlborough

December 30, 1995	Germany	4–4	Slovakia	New England Sports Center, Marlborough

January 2, 1996	Switzerland	3–3	Germany	New England Sports Center, Marlborough

January 2, 1996	Ukraine	3–6	Slovakia	New England Sports Center, Marlborough

January 3, 1996	Switzerland	3–7	Slovakia	New England Sports Center, Marlborough

January 3, 1996	Ukraine	0–5	Germany	New England Sports Center, Marlborough

Ukraine was relegated for the 1997 World Junior Championships.

== Playoffs ==
Quarter finals
A2	United States	0
B3	Sweden	3
B2	Russia	6
A3	Finland	2

Semi finals
QF1	Sweden	8
B1	Czech Republic	2
QF2	Russia	3
A1	Canada	4

Final
SF1	Sweden	1
SF2	Canada	4
Third place
QF1	Czech Republic	1
QF2	Russia	4

=== Quarterfinals ===
January 1, 1996; 13:00	United States	0–3 (0–1, 0–1, 0–1)	Sweden	Mullins Center, Amherst

Brian Boucher
Goalies
Per-Ragnar Bergkvist

0–1	10:12 – Ekman
0–2	38:45 – Molin
0–3	59:21 – Davidsson

24
Shots
31

January 1, 1996; 17:00	Russia	6–2 (0–1, 5–1, 1–0)	Finland	Mullins Center, Amherst

=== Semifinals ===
January 3, 1996; 15:30	Canada	4–3 (1–1, 2–1, 1–1)	Russia	Matthews Arena, Boston; Attendance: 2,500 (approx.)

José Theodore
Goalies
Alexei Yegorov

Podollan (Gauthier) (PP) – 8:41	1–0
	1–1	11:24 – Morozov (Shafikov, Nabokov) (PP)
Watt (Redden, Dube) (PP) – 31:11	2–1
Podollan (Botterill, Holland) – 32:43	3–1
	3–2	35:39 – Petrochinin (Nabokov)
Iginla (SH) – 46:40	4–2
	4–3	50:34 – Morozov (Nabokov, Shafikov) (PP)

28
Shots
49

January 3, 1996; 18:30	Sweden	8–2 (0–0, 6–1, 2–1)	Czech Republic	Matthews Arena, Boston

=== 5th place game ===
January 4, 1996; 12:00	Finland	7–8 (3–1, 3–4, 1–2, 0–1)	United States	New England Sports Center, Marlborough

Vesa Toskala
Goalies
Brian Boucher

Miika Elomo – 0:58	1–0
	1–1	8:41 – Swanson (Farkas, Smith)
Riihijärvi (Salpa, Kuki) – 13:26	2–1
Salonen (Lydman, Jokinen) – 15:22	3–1
	3–2	22:35 – Drury (Sylvia)
Niemi (Jokinen) – 25:08	4–2
	4–3	29:52 – Cullen (Drury, Sylvia)
	4–4	30:08 – York (Swanson, Clymer)
	4–5	10:41 – Herr (Kealty)
Niemi (Elomo, Lotvonen) – 33:41	5–5
Kuki (Salpa) – 36:43	6–5
Elomo (Jokinen) – 43:59	7–5
	7–6	52:32 – Cullen (Parrish)
	7–7	53:21 – Reasoner (Swanson, Sylvia)
	7–8	63:02 – McCarthy (Reasoner)

17
Shots
44

=== Bronze medal game ===
January 4, 1996; 15:30	Czech Republic	1–4 (1–0, 0–2, 0–2)	Russia (bronze)	Conte Forum, Chestnut Hill

Tomáš Vokoun
Goalies
Alexei Yegorov

Varada (Kubina) – 1:40	1–0
	1–1	27:42 – Morozov (Ryabykin, Shafikov)
	1–2	39:18 – Samsonov (Klevakin, Yepanchintsev)
	1–3	43:11 – Petrunin (Korolyuk)
	1–4	46:01 – Shafikov (Zyuzin)

42
Shots
21

=== Gold medal game ===
January 4, 1996; 19:30	(silver) Sweden	1–4 (1–1, 0–2, 0–1)	Canada (gold)	Conte Forum, Chestnut Hill; Attendance: 5,781

Per-Ragnar Bergkvist
Goalies
José Théodore

	0–1	1:36 – Langkow (Domenichelli, Iginla)
Nilson – 8:41	1–1
	1–2	33:00 – Langkow (Iginla)
	1–3	34:12 – Domenichelli (Langkow)
	1–4	48:12 – McCauley (Wright, Botterill)

33
Shots
35

== Scoring leaders ==
Player	Country	GP	G	A	Pts
Jarome Iginla	Canada	6	5	7	12
Florian Keller	Germany	6	4	8	12
Marco Sturm	Germany	6	4	6	10
Miika Elomo	Finland	6	4	5	9
Johan Davidsson	Sweden	7	3	6	9
Ruslan Shafikov	Russia	7	1	8	9
Alexei Morozov	Russia	7	5	3	8
Juho Jokinen	Finland	6	3	5	8
Dmitri Nabokov	Russia	7	3	5	8
Marcus Nilson	Sweden	7	3	5	8

== Goaltending leaders ==
(minimum 40% team's total ice time)

Player	Country	MINS	GA	GAA	SO	W	L	T
José Théodore	Canada	240	6	1.50	0	4	0	0
Per-Ragnar Bergkvist	Sweden	240	6	1.50	1	2	1	1
Magnus Wennström	Sweden	180	7	2.33	0	2	1	1
Alexei Yegorov	Russia	358.9	17	2.84	0	3	2	1
Miikka Kiprusoff	Finland	159.3	9	3.39	0	1	2	0

== Tournament awards ==
All-star team

- Goaltender: (Canada) José Théodore
- Defencemen: (Canada) Nolan Baumgartner, (Sweden) Mattias Öhlund
- Forwards: (Canada) Jarome Iginla, (Sweden) Johan Davidsson, (Russia) Alexei Morozov

IIHF best player awards

- Goaltender: (Canada) José Théodore
- Defenceman: (Sweden) Mattias Öhlund
- Forward: (Canada) Jarome Iginla

== Final standings ==
	Team
1st place, gold medalist(s)	Canada
2nd place, silver medalist(s)	Sweden
3rd place, bronze medalist(s)	Russia
4th	Czech Republic
5th	United States
6th	Finland
7th	Slovakia
8th	Germany
9th	Switzerland
10th	Ukraine

== Pool B ==
The second tier was held in Sosnowiec and Tychy, Poland, from December 28 to January 4. Two groups of four played round robins, and then the top three played each of the top three teams from the other group. All scores carried forward except the results against the lone eliminated team from each group.

=== Preliminary round ===
Group A

Team	Pld	W	L	D	GF	GA	GD	Pts	Poland men's national junior ice hockey team	Hungary men's national junior ice hockey team	Japan men's national junior ice hockey team	Austria men's national junior ice hockey team
Poland	3	3	0	0	32	2	+30	6		7–2	9–0	16–0
Hungary	3	2	1	0	14	12	+2	4	2–7		7–1	5–4
Japan	3	1	2	0	4	17	−13	2	0–9	1–7		3–1
Austria	3	0	3	0	5	24	−19	0	0–16	4–5	1–3	

Group B

Team	Pld	W	L	D	GF	GA	GD	Pts	Latvia men's national junior ice hockey team	Italy men's national junior ice hockey team	Norway men's national junior ice hockey team	France men's national junior ice hockey team
Latvia	3	3	0	0	15	9	+6	6		5–1	5–4	5–4
Italy	3	1	2	0	8	11	−3	2	1–5		3–4	4–2
Norway	3	1	2	0	8	9	−1	2	4–5	4–3		0–1
France	3	1	2	0	7	9	−2	2	4–5	2–4	1–0	

=== Final Round ===
Pos	Team	Pld	W	L	D	GF	GA	GD	Pts	Poland men's national junior ice hockey team	Latvia men's national junior ice hockey team	Norway men's national junior ice hockey team	Hungary men's national junior ice hockey team	Italy men's national junior ice hockey team	Japan men's national junior ice hockey team
1	Poland	5	5	0	0	31	7	+24	10		5–3	3–2	7–2	7–0	9–0
2	Latvia	5	4	1	0	22	16	+6	8	3–5		5–4	5–4	5–1	4–2
3	Norway	5	3	2	0	18	15	+3	6	2–3	4–5		3–1	4–3	5–3
4	Hungary	5	2	3	0	19	16	+3	4	2–7	4–5	1–3		5–0	7–1
5	Italy	5	1	4	0	9	25	−16	2	0–7	1–5	3–4	0–5		5–4
6	Japan	5	0	5	0	10	30	−20	0	0–9	2–4	3–5	1–7	4–5	

Poland was promoted to Pool A for 1997.

=== Relegation Round ===
France	4–2	Austria

France	7–3	Austria

Austria was relegated to Pool C for 1997.

== Pool C ==
Played in Jesenice, Bled, and Kranj, Slovenia, from December 30 to January 3.

=== Preliminary round ===
Group A

Team	Pld	W	L	D	GF	GA	GD	Pts	Slovenia men's national junior ice hockey team	Denmark men's national junior ice hockey team	Romania men's national junior ice hockey team	Netherlands men's national junior ice hockey team
Slovenia	3	3	0	0	22	5	+17	6		2–1	10–4	10–0
Denmark	3	2	1	0	18	5	+13	4	1–2		13–0	4–3
Romania	3	1	2	0	10	26	−16	2	4–10	0–13		6–3
Netherlands	3	0	3	0	6	20	−14	0	0–10	3–4	3–6	

Group B

Team	Pld	W	L	D	GF	GA	GD	Pts	Kazakhstan men's national junior ice hockey team	Belarus men's national junior ice hockey team	Great Britain men's national junior ice hockey team	Spain men's national junior ice hockey team
Kazakhstan	3	3	0	0	25	11	+14	6		7–6	7–2	11–3
Belarus	3	2	1	0	23	11	+12	4	6–7		6–4	11–0
Great Britain	3	1	2	0	14	14	0	2	2–7	4–6		8–1
Spain	3	0	3	0	4	30	−26	0	3–11	0–11	1–8	

=== Placement Games ===
- 7th place:Netherlands 4 – 1 Spain
- 5th place:Great Britain 3 – 2 Romania
- 3rd place:Denmark 5 – 4 Belarus
- 1st Place:Kazakhstan 6 – 5 Slovenia

Kazakhstan was promoted to Pool B, and Spain was relegated to Pool D for 1997.

== Pool D ==
Played in Tallinn, Estonia, from December 31 to January 4.

=== Preliminary round ===
Group A

Team	Pld	W	L	D	GF	GA	GD	Pts	Estonia men's national junior ice hockey team	Serbia and Montenegro men's national junior ice hockey team	South Africa men's national junior ice hockey team
Estonia	2	2	0	0	24	3	+21	4		4–2	20–1
Yugoslavia	2	1	1	0	10	5	+5	2	2–4		8–1
South Africa	2	0	2	0	2	28	−26	0	1–20	1–8	

Group B

Team	Pld	W	L	D	GF	GA	GD	Pts	Croatia men's national junior ice hockey team	Lithuania men's national junior ice hockey team	Bulgaria men's national junior ice hockey team
Croatia	2	2	0	0	20	4	+16	4		5–2	15–2
Lithuania	2	1	1	0	21	7	+14	2	2–5		19–2
Bulgaria	2	0	2	0	4	34	−30	0	2–15	2–19	

=== Placement Games ===
- 5th place:Bulgaria 10 – 1 South Africa
- 3rd place:Yugoslavia 5 – 4 Lithuania
- 1st Place:Croatia 2 – 0 Estonia

Croatia was promoted to Pool C for 1997.
