= Cameron Mann =

Canadian ice hockey player

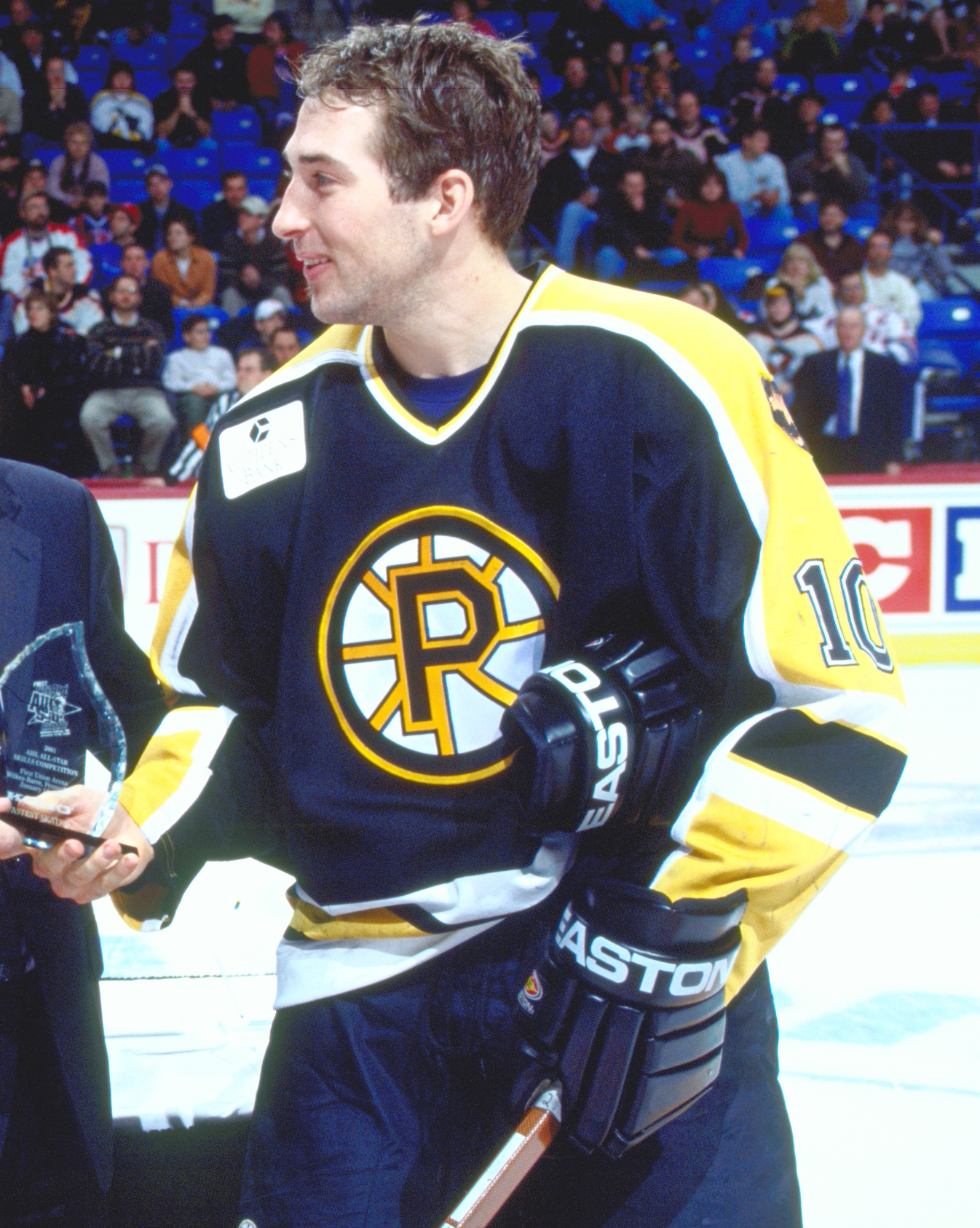
- Mann in 2001
- Born: April 20, 1977 (age 49) Thompson, Manitoba, Canada
- Height: 6 ft 0 in (183 cm)
- Weight: 209 lb (95 kg; 14 st 13 lb)
- Position: Right wing
- Shot: Right
- Played for: Boston Bruins; Nashville Predators; ERC Ingolstadt; Ilves; Füchse Duisburg; Nottingham Panthers
- NHL draft: 99th overall, 1995; Boston Bruins
- Playing career: 1997–2010

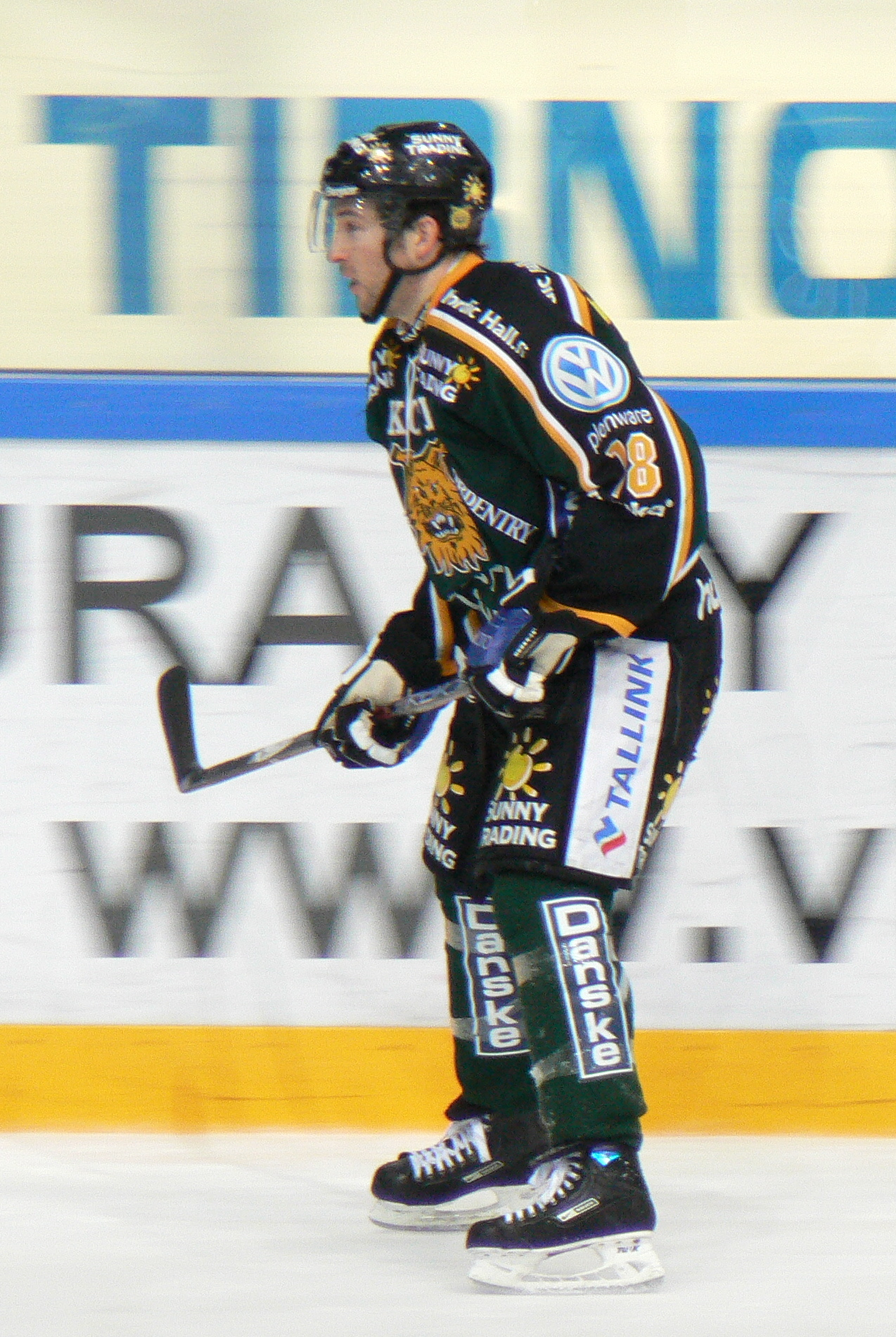
Mann playing for Ilves in 2008.

Cameron Douglas Mann (born April 20, 1977) is a Canadian former professional ice hockey Winger who played in the National Hockey League (NHL) with the Boston Bruins and Nashville Predators. He finished his career with the EIHL's Nottingham Panthers, initially signing with the team on July 22, 2009.

== Playing career ==
An alumnus of the Red Lake District Minor Hockey Association and the Peterborough Petes of the OHL, Mann was drafted 99th overall by the Boston Bruins in the 1995 NHL entry draft and appeared in 90 NHL games with the Bruins over four seasons. He was traded to the Dallas Stars in June 2001 for Richard Jackman but remained with their American Hockey League affiliate the Utah Grizzlies and never played for the Stars. He was then traded to the Nashville Predators in June 2002 for David Gosselin and a 5th round pick in the 2003 Draft. Mann went on to play just 4 games for the Predators.

In 2003, Mann moved on to the European League and signed with ERC Ingolstadt of the Deutsche Eishockey Liga and stayed for four seasons. He moved to Finland's SM-liiga in 2007 and signed with Ilves before returning to Germany in 2008, signed for Oberliga side Herver EV and then moved to EV Duisburg Die Füchse. For the 2009-2010 season Mann played in Nottingham for the Panthers winning a Challenge Cup and won team MVP honors.

== Coaching career ==
Mann retired from professional hockey on April 7, 2010, announcing his retirement after the Panthers finished third in the 2009–10 EIHL playoffs. Since his retirement, Mann joined the OJHL's Peterborough Stars as an assistant coach. In March 2012 the Peterborough Stars ceased operations, merging with the Lindsay Muskies and ending his association with the team.

== Personal ==
Mann was born in Thompson, Manitoba but was raised in Balmertown, Ontario.

== Career statistics ==
=== Regular season and playoffs ===
			Regular season					Playoffs
Season	Team	League	GP	G	A	Pts	PIM	GP	G	A	Pts	PIM
1993–94	Peterborough Bees	OPJHL	16	3	14	17	23	—	—	—	—	—
1993–94	Peterborough Petes	OHL	49	8	17	25	18	7	1	1	2	2
1994–95	Peterborough Petes	OHL	64	18	25	43	40	11	3	8	11	4
1995–96	Peterborough Petes	OHL	66	42	60	102	108	24	27	16	43	33
1996–97	Peterborough Petes	OHL	51	33	50	83	91	11	10	18	28	16
1997–98	Providence Bruins	AHL	71	21	26	47	99	—	—	—	—	—
1997–98	Boston Bruins	NHL	9	0	1	1	4	—	—	—	—	—
1998–99	Providence Bruins	AHL	43	21	25	46	65	11	7	7	14	4
1998–99	Boston Bruins	NHL	33	5	2	7	17	1	0	0	0	0
1999–2000	Providence Bruins	AHL	29	7	12	19	45	11	6	7	13	0
1999–2000	Boston Bruins	NHL	32	8	4	12	13	—	—	—	—	—
2000–01	Providence Bruins	AHL	39	24	23	47	59	—	—	—	—	—
2000–01	Boston Bruins	NHL	15	1	3	4	6	—	—	—	—	—
2001–02	Utah Grizzlies	AHL	61	19	32	51	83	5	0	0	0	6
2002–03	Milwaukee Admirals	AHL	59	26	31	57	75	6	3	3	6	0
2002–03	Nashville Predators	NHL	4	0	0	0	0	—	—	—	—	—
2003–04	ERC Ingolstadt	DEL	44	16	25	41	76	6	0	0	0	10
2004–05	ERC Ingolstadt	DEL	46	17	21	38	42	9	2	5	7	20
2005–06	ERC Ingolstadt	DEL	49	17	21	38	48	7	2	3	5	6
2006–07	ERC Ingolstadt	DEL	16	3	5	8	37	2	0	1	1	2
2007–08	Ilves	SM-l	34	11	8	19	24	9	0	2	2	20
2008–09	Herner EV 2007	GER.3	14	6	12	18	22	—	—	—	—	—
2008–09	Füchse Duisburg	DEL	17	5	8	13	30	—	—	—	—	—
2009–10	Nottingham Panthers	EIHL	49	32	31	63	95	3	1	0	1	0
AHL totals			302	118	149	267	426	33	16	17	33	10
NHL totals			93	14	10	24	40	1	0	0	0	0
DEL totals			172	58	80	138	233	24	4	9	13	38

Medal record

Representing Canada

Ice hockey

World Junior Championships
Gold medal – first place	1997 Switzerland	

=== International ===
Year	Team	Event	Result	GP	G	A	Pts	PIM
1997	Canada	WJC	1st place, gold medalist(s)	7	3	4	7	10
Junior totals				7	3	4	7	10

== Awards and honours ==
Award	Year
OHL
First All-Star Team	1996, 1997
Jim Mahon Memorial Trophy	1996
J. Ross Robertson Cup (Peterborough Petes)	1996
CHL Third All-Star Team	1996, 1997
Memorial Cup All-Star Team	1996
Memorial Cup Stafford Smythe Memorial Trophy	1996
AHL
Calder Cup (Providence Bruins)	1999
All-Star Game	2001, 2004
DEL
All-Star Game	2004
