= Wilska =

Wilska is a surname. Notable people with the surname include:

- Alvar Wilska (1911–1987), Finnish physicist and inventor
- Kimmo Wilska (born 1956), Finnish newscaster
- Tapio Wilska (born 1969), Finnish singer
