= 1996 World Ice Hockey Championships =

1996 World Ice Hockey Championships may refer to:

- 1996 Men's World Ice Hockey Championships
- 1996 World Junior Ice Hockey Championships
