= Marek Melenovský =

Czech ice hockey player

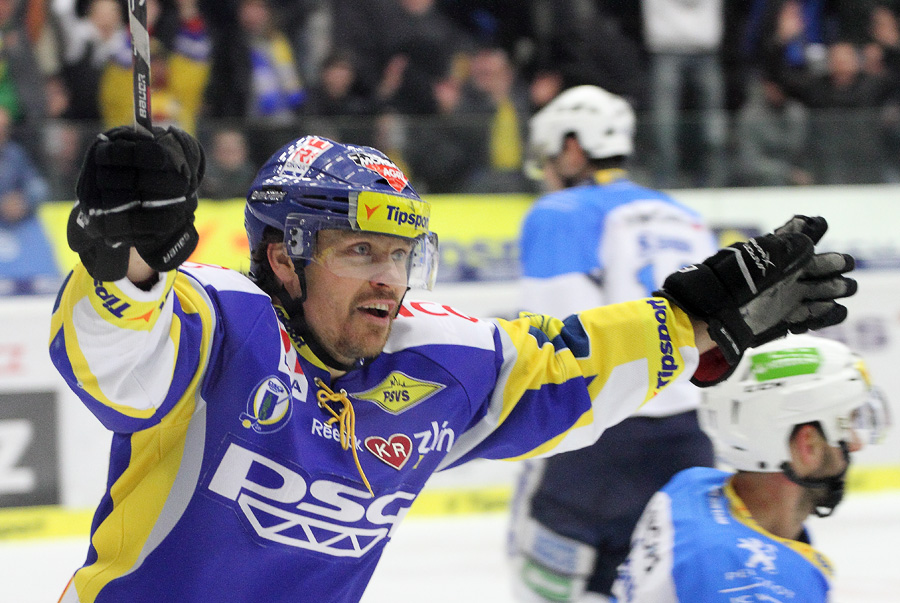
- Melenovský in 2012
- Born: March 30, 1977 (age 49) Humpolec, Czechoslovakia
- Height: 5 ft 8 in (173 cm)
- Weight: 172 lb (78 kg; 12 st 4 lb)
- Position: Centre
- Shot: Left
- Czech Extraliga team: HC Karlovy Vary
- NHL draft: 171st overall, 1995; Toronto Maple Leafs
- Playing career: 1994–2016

Marek Melenovský (born March 30, 1977) is a Czech former professional ice hockey player. He was selected by the Toronto Maple Leafs in the 7th round (171st overall) of the 1995 NHL entry draft.

Melenovský played with HC Karlovy Vary in the Czech Extraliga during the 2010–11 Czech Extraliga season."HC Energie Karlovy Vary at eliteprospects.com". Elite Prospects. 1 December 2020.

== Career statistics ==
=== Regular season and playoffs ===
			Regular season					Playoffs
Season	Team	League	GP	G	A	Pts	PIM	GP	G	A	Pts	PIM
1991–92	ASD Dukla Jihlava	TCH U18	35	23	20	43	—	—	—	—	—	—
1993–94	ASD Dukla Jihlava	ELH	1	0	0	0	0	—	—	—	—	—
1994–95	HC Dukla Jihlava	CZE U20	28	23	11	34	—	—	—	—	—	—
1994–95	HC Dukla Jihlava	ELH	3	0	0	0	0	—	—	—	—	—
1995–96	HC Dukla Jihlava	ELH	30	3	2	5	10	5	1	2	3	4
1996–97	HC Dukla Jihlava	ELH	46	5	13	18	22	—	—	—	—	—
1996–97	St. John's Maple Leafs	AHL	2	1	2	3	0	2	0	0	0	0
1997–98	HC Dukla Jihlava	ELH	48	10	10	20	24	—	—	—	—	—
1998–99	HC Dukla Jihlava	ELH	52	7	10	17	26	—	—	—	—	—
1999–2000	HC Femax Havířov	ELH	49	12	12	24	34	—	—	—	—	—
2000–01	HC Femax Havířov	ELH	48	22	20	42	43	—	—	—	—	—
2001–02	HC Vítkovice	ELH	50	14	22	36	36	14	1	11	12	31
2002–03	HC Vítkovice	ELH	43	7	11	18	22	—	—	—	—	—
2002–03	HC JME Znojemští Orli	ELH	8	3	2	5	2	6	1	1	2	10
2003–04	HC Oceláři Třinec	ELH	52	23	20	43	52	7	2	0	2	4
2004–05	HC Oceláři Třinec	ELH	37	6	7	13	22	—	—	—	—	—
2005–06	HC Hamé Zlín	ELH	50	8	11	19	86	6	0	2	2	4
2006–07	HC Hamé Zlín	ELH	48	12	7	19	67	5	0	0	0	2
2007–08	HC Energie Karlovy Vary	ELH	50	17	7	24	107	18	3	5	8	6
2008–09	HC Energie Karlovy Vary	ELH	51	12	11	23	32	16	3	11	14	22
2009–10	HC Energie Karlovy Vary	ELH	52	9	17	26	26	—	—	—	—	—
2010–11	HC Energie Karlovy Vary	ELH	43	8	9	17	22	5	1	1	2	2
2011–12	HC Energie Karlovy Vary	ELH	29	5	10	15	16	—	—	—	—	—
2011–12	PSG Zlín	ELH	21	1	4	5	6	12	4	3	7	16
2012–13	PSG Zlín	ELH	43	4	6	10	57	12	1	2	3	4
2013–14	PSG Zlín	ELH	46	4	5	9	26	17	2	4	6	22
2014–15	HC Dukla Jihlava	CZE.2	48	18	20	38	75	11	5	3	8	8
2015–16	HC Dukla Jihlava	CZE.2	41	6	11	17	28	10	2	0	2	12
ELH totals			900	192	216	408	738	123	19	42	61	127

=== International ===
Year	Team	Event	GP	G	A	Pts	PIM
1995	Czech Republic	EJC	5	2	4	6	2
1996	Czech Republic	WJC	6	1	0	1	0
1997	Czech Republic	WJC	7	4	3	7	4
Junior totals			18	7	7	14	6
