= David Aebischer =

Swiss ice hockey player (born 1978)

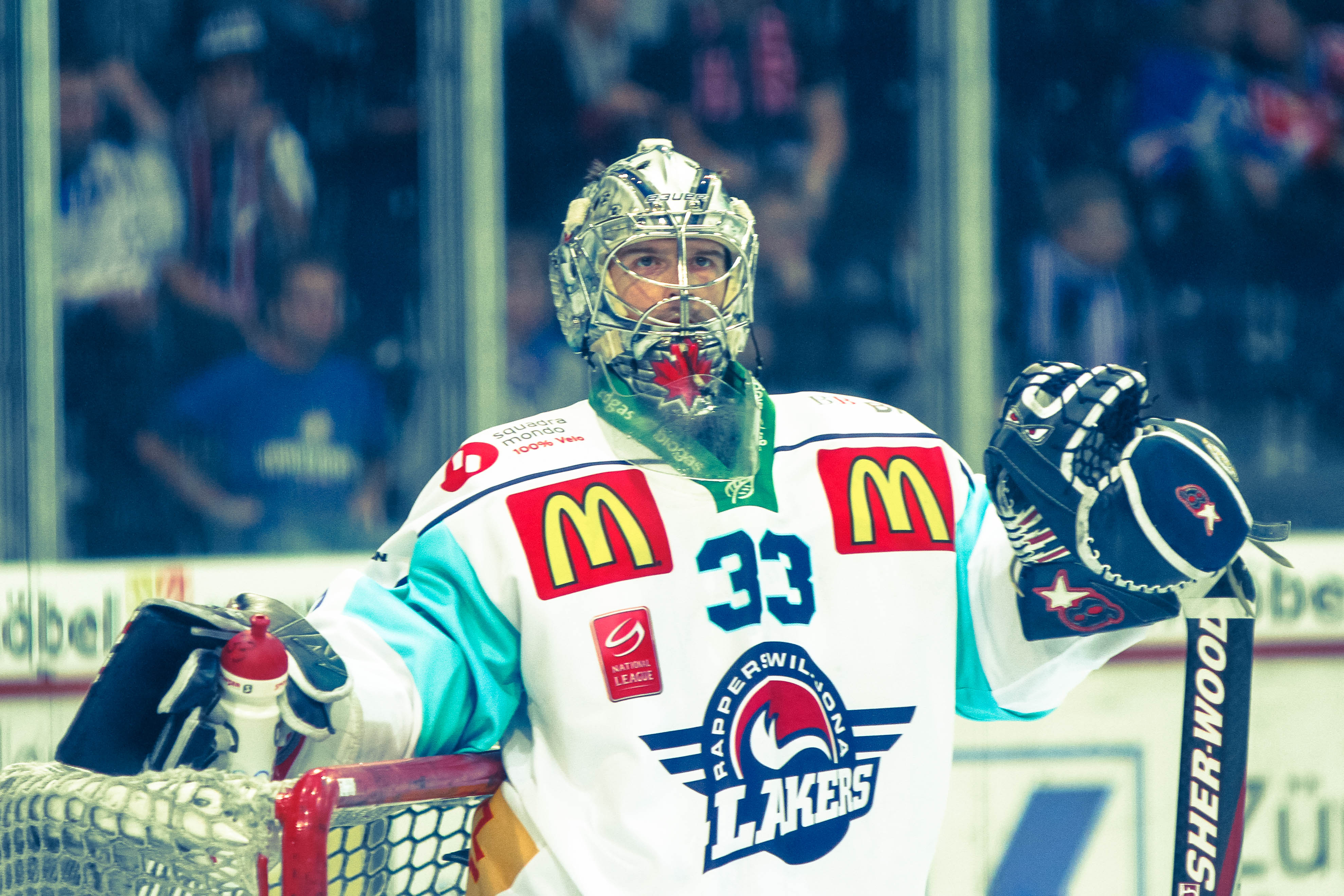
- Aebischer with the Rapperswil-Jona Lakers in 2012
- Born: February 7, 1978 (age 48) Geneva, Switzerland
- Height: 6 ft 1 in (185 cm)
- Weight: 185 lb (84 kg; 13 st 3 lb)
- Position: Goaltender
- Caught: Left
- Played for: HC Fribourg-Gottéron; Colorado Avalanche; HC Lugano; Montreal Canadiens; Phoenix Coyotes; Rapperswil-Jona Lakers; HC Thurgau
- National team: Switzerland
- NHL draft: 161st overall, 1997; Colorado Avalanche
- Playing career: 1996–2015

David Aebischer (born February 7, 1978) is a Swiss former professional ice hockey goaltender who played in the National Hockey League (NHL) with the Colorado Avalanche, Montreal Canadiens and the Phoenix Coyotes. He was a member of the 2001 Stanley Cup champion Avalanche team, becoming the first Swiss native to achieve the feat. Aebischer also played several seasons in his native Switzerland with HC Fribourg-Gottéron, HC Lugano and the Rapperswil-Jona Lakers of the National League (NL).

Aebischer is currently a goalie coach for HC Fribourg-Gottéron.

== Playing career ==
As a youth, Aebischer played in the 1992 Quebec International Pee-Wee Hockey Tournament with a team from Switzerland.

Aebischer was drafted 161st overall by the Colorado Avalanche in the 1997 NHL entry draft. He moved to North America in 1997 and spent the 1997–98 season in the ECHL, first with the Chesapeake Icebreakers and then with the Wheeling Nailers. He spent the next two seasons with Colorado's American Hockey League (AHL) affiliate, the Hershey Bears, with whom he compiled a 46-33-7 record. When the Avalanche traded backup goaltender Marc Denis to the Columbus Blue Jackets in the summer of 2000, Aebischer became the full-time backup to starting goaltender Patrick Roy.

Aebischer played 26 games during his rookie season with Colorado. Aebischer made his NHL debut, and first NHL start on October 18, 2000 against the Columbus Blue Jackets in Columbus for his first NHL victory. On October 26, 2000 in his second career start, Aebischer shut out the Chicago Blackhawks in Chicago for his first NHL career shutout. The year would prove a successful one, as Roy backstopped the Avalanche to their second Stanley Cup championship, defeating the New Jersey Devils in a seven-game final series. With the win, Aebischer became the first Swiss hockey player to win the Stanley Cup.

Following two more seasons as the Avalanche backup, Aebischer became Colorado's starting goaltender following Roy's retirement in the summer of 2003. He played 62 games and posted 32 wins during the 2003–04 season. That season, he started his first career playoff game for the Avalanche and led Colorado to the second round, where they lost to the San Jose Sharks in six games. The following season, due to the NHL lockout, Aebischer returned to Switzerland and played for HC Lugano in the Nationalliga A.

Aebischer returned to the Avalanche for the 2005–06 season. He was unable to duplicate his pre-lockout form and his inconsistent play led to him being traded to the Montreal Canadiens in exchange for goaltender José Théodore on March 8, 2006, a day before the NHL trade deadline.

That summer, Montreal re-signed him to a one-year deal worth $1.9 million. He served as Cristobal Huet's backup for the 2006–07 season and posted a 13–12–3 record. The Canadiens failed to make the playoffs and Montreal opted not to re-sign Aebischer.

On July 19, 2007, Aebischer signed a one-year, $600,000 contract with the Phoenix Coyotes. However, he lost the goaltending battle in training camp to Alex Auld and Mikael Tellqvist, and was waived. He went unclaimed and was subsequently assigned to the Coyotes AHL affiliate, the San Antonio Rampage. On November 23, 2007, Aebischer was loaned to HC Lugano to make room on the San Antonio roster for goaltender Alex Auld.

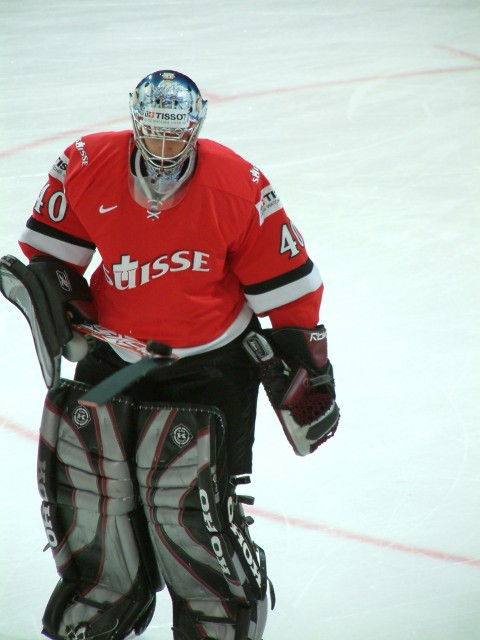

Medal record

Representing Switzerland

Ice hockey

World Junior Championships
Bronze medal – third place	1998 Helsinki	

In August, 2011, after four seasons back in his native Switzerland, Aebischer was invited to the training camp of the Winnipeg Jets for the 2011–12 season on a tryout contract. On October 5, 2011, it was announced that Aebischer would play with the Jets' AHL affiliate, the St. John's IceCaps.

On July 1, 2012, Aebischer again left North America and signed a one-year contract with the Rapperswil-Jona Lakers of the National League A.

In the 2014–15 season, Aebischer played five games with HC Thurgau of the National League B before announcing his retirement from his playing career to focus for a coaching role on January 25, 2015.

== International play ==
Aebischer has represented Switzerland internationally on many occasions. His first international experience came in the 1997 World Junior Ice Hockey Championships, hosted by Switzerland. The Swiss finished in 7th place. Aebischer returned as Switzerland's starting goaltender the following year at the 1998 World Juniors and led the team past the quarterfinal round and to a bronze medal finish, defeating the heavily favoured Czech Republic in the bronze medal match. Aebischer has also appeared for Switzerland in five IIHF World Championships and two Winter Olympic Games.

== Career statistics ==
=== Regular season and playoffs ===
			Regular season										Playoffs
Season	Team	League	GP	W	L	T	OTL	MIN	GA	SO	GAA	SV%	GP	W	L	MIN	GA	SO	GAA	SV%
1994–95	HC Fribourg–Gottéron	SUI U20	27	—	—	—	—	—	—	—	3.58	—	2	—	—	—	—	—	2.50	—
1995–96	HC Fribourg–Gottéron	SUI U20	29	—	—	—	—	—	—	—	3.20	—	3	—	—	—	—	—	3.01	—
1996–97	HC Fribourg–Gottéron	SUI U20	24	—	—	—	—	—	—	—	2.65	—	2	—	—	—	—	—	2.22	—
1996–97	HC Fribourg–Gottéron	NDA	10	—	—	—	—	577	34	0	3.54	—	3	1	2	184	13	0	4.24	—
1997–98	Chesapeake Icebreakers	ECHL	17	5	7	2	—	930	52	0	3.35	.897	—	—	—	—	—	—	—	—
1997–98	Wheeling Nailers	ECHL	10	5	3	1	—	564	30	1	3.19	.858	—	—	—	—	—	—	—	—
1997–98	Hershey Bears	AHL	2	0	0	1	—	79	5	0	3.76	.853	—	—	—	—	—	—	—	—
1997–98	HC Fribourg–Gottéron	NDA	1	1	0	0	—	60	1	0	1.00	—	4	—	—	240	17	—	4.25	—
1998–99	Hershey Bears	AHL	38	17	10	5	—	1932	79	2	2.45	.920	3	1	2	152	6	0	2.37	.925
1999–00	Hershey Bears	AHL	58	29	23	2	—	3259	180	1	3.31	.902	14	7	6	788	40	2	3.05	.917
2000–01	Colorado Avalanche	NHL	26	12	7	3	—	1393	52	3	2.24	.903	1	0	0	1	0	0	0.00	—
2001–02	Colorado Avalanche	NHL	21	13	6	0	—	1184	37	2	1.88	.931	1	0	0	34	1	0	1.79	.929
2002–03	Colorado Avalanche	NHL	22	7	12	0	—	1235	50	1	2.43	.916	—	—	—	—	—	—	—	—
2003–04	Colorado Avalanche	NHL	62	32	19	9	—	3703	129	4	2.09	.924	11	6	5	662	23	1	2.08	.922
2004–05	HC Lugano	NLA	18	12	2	3	—	1019	41	0	2.41	.933	4	1	3	240	10	0	2.50	.939
2005–06	Colorado Avalanche	NHL	43	25	14	—	2	2477	123	3	2.98	.900	—	—	—	—	—	—	—	—
2005–06	Montreal Canadiens	NHL	7	4	3	—	0	418	26	0	3.73	.892	—	—	—	—	—	—	—	—
2006–07	Montreal Canadiens	NHL	32	13	12	—	3	1760	93	0	3.17	.900	—	—	—	—	—	—	—	—
2007–08	Phoenix Coyotes	NHL	1	0	1	—	0	60	3	0	3.00	.909	—	—	—	—	—	—	—	—
2007–08	San Antonio Rampage	AHL	5	2	3	—	0	302	13	0	2.58	.898	—	—	—	—	—	—	—	—
2007–08	HC Lugano	NLA	26	12	14	—	—	1576	69	2	2.63	.921	—	—	—	—	—	—	—	—
2008–09	HC Lugano	NLA	49	27	22	—	—	2953	140	2	2.84	.923	7	3	4	452	26	0	3.45	.895
2009–10	HC Lugano	NLA	48	23	24	—	—	2897	156	2	3.23	.916	4	0	4	240	22	0	5.50	.836
2010–11	HC Lugano	NLA	35	10	18	—	3	2038	109	3	3.21	.872	—	—	—	—	—	—	—	—
2011–12	St. John's IceCaps	AHL	31	15	12	—	2	1722	82	1	2.86	.895	1	0	0	26	2	0	4.56	.833
2012–13	Rapperswil–Jona Lakers	NLA	40	13	21	—	1	2256	146	2	3.88	.897	—	—	—	—	—	—	—	—
2013–14	Rapperswil–Jona Lakers	NLA	43	9	28	—	3	2364	148	0	3.76	.872	—	—	—	—	—	—	—	—
2014–15	HC Thurgau	NLB	5	—	—	—	—	—	—	—	4.93	.856	—	—	—	—	—	—	—	—
NLA totals			270	—	—	—	—	15,740	844	11	3.22	—	22	—	—	1356	88	—	3.89	—
NHL totals			214	106	74	12	5	12,230	513	13	2.52	.912	13	6	5	697	24	1	2.07	.922

=== International ===
Year	Team	Event	GP	W	L	T	MIN	GA	SO	GAA	SV%
1996	Switzerland	EJC	5	—	—	—	—	—	—	3.95	.884
1997	Switzerland	WJC	5	3	1	1	300	10	0	2.00	.917
1998	Switzerland	WJC	6	4	2	0	379	10	0	1.58	.951
1998	Switzerland	WC	7	2	4	1	376	18	0	2.87	.895
1999	Switzerland	WC	4	1	3	0	173	13	1	4.51	.833
2002	Switzerland	OLY	2	1	0	0	81	6	0	4.44	.806
2005	Switzerland	WC	1	0	0	1	60	3	0	3.00	.903
2006	Switzerland	OLY	4	1	0	2	200	7	0	2.10	.940
2006	Switzerland	WC	6	2	2	2	359	16	0	2.67	.882
2007	Switzerland	WC	1	0	1	0	60	6	0	6.00	.793
Senior totals			25	7	10	6	1309	69	1	3.16	.876
