= Mark Parrish =

American ice hockey player (born 1977)

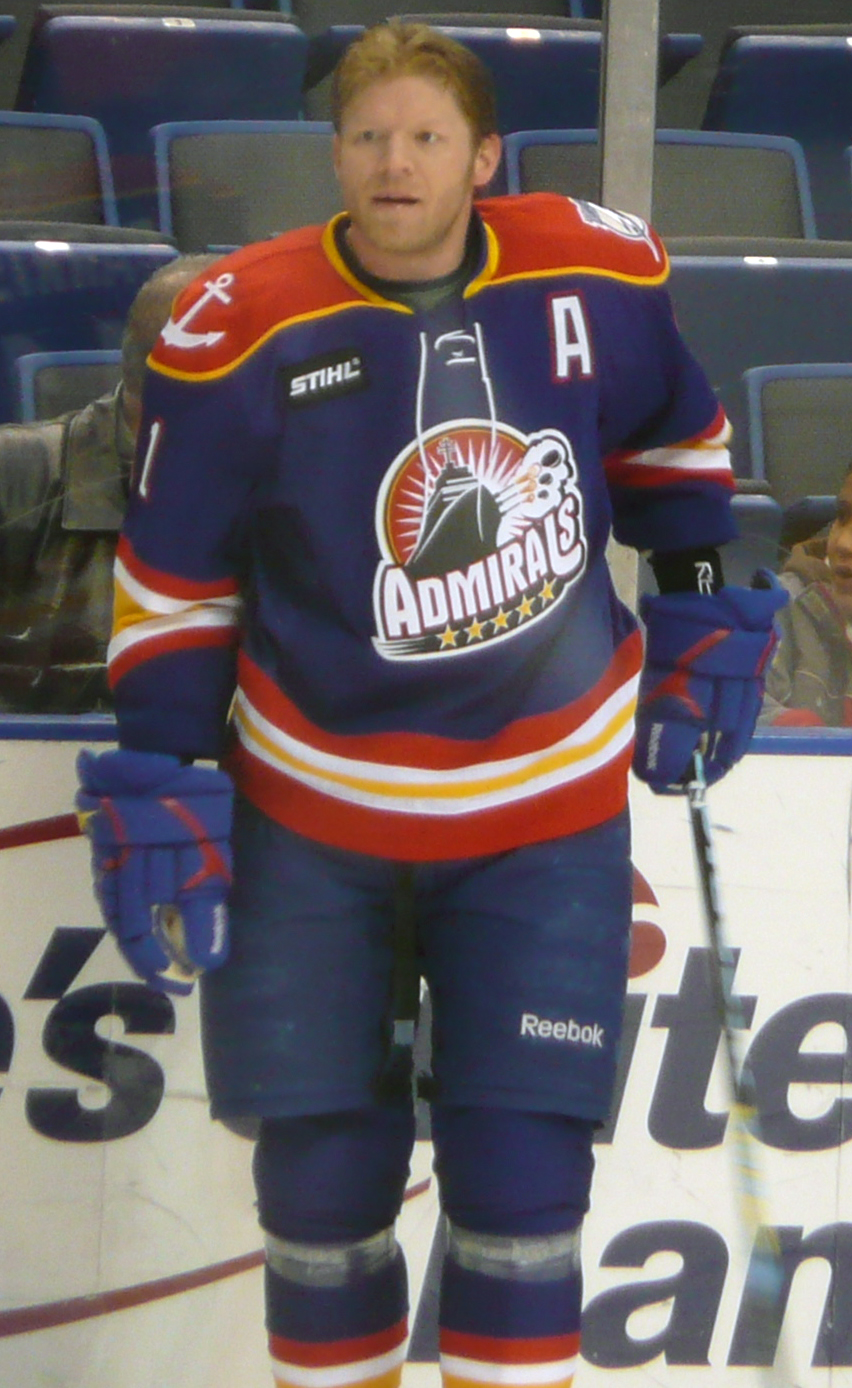
- Parrish with the Norfolk Admirals in 2010
- Born: February 2, 1977 (age 49) Bloomington, Minnesota, U.S.
- Height: 5 ft 11 in (180 cm)
- Weight: 200 lb (91 kg; 14 st 4 lb)
- Position: Right wing
- Shot: Right
- Played for: Florida Panthers; New York Islanders; Los Angeles Kings; Minnesota Wild; Dallas Stars; Tampa Bay Lightning; Buffalo Sabres
- National team: United States
- NHL draft: 79th overall, 1996; Colorado Avalanche
- Playing career: 1997–2012
Medal record
Representing United States
Ice hockey
World Junior Championships
Silver medal – second place	1997 Geneva

Mark Daniel Parrish (born February 2, 1977) is an American former professional ice hockey right winger. Parrish played 11 seasons and over 700 games in the NHL with the Florida Panthers, New York Islanders, Los Angeles Kings, Minnesota Wild, Dallas Stars, Tampa Bay Lightning, and Buffalo Sabres. He’s currently a broadcaster for the Minnesota Wild, covering pregame, intermission, and postgame. In addition to those duties, Mark is an analyst on 'NHL Tonight' on the NHL Network.

== Playing career ==
Parrish, a native of Bloomington, Minnesota, attended Bloomington Jefferson High School and won two high school State Championships with the Jaguars in 1993 and 1994. Upon graduating from high school, Parrish joined the St. Cloud State Huskies of the Western Collegiate Hockey Association (WCHA). After recording 30 points in 39 games as a freshman, Parrish was drafted in the third round, 79th overall, by the Colorado Avalanche in the 1996 NHL entry draft. Parrish returned to the St. Cloud for one more season, then decided to forgo his final two years of collegiate hockey to join the Seattle Thunderbirds of the Western Hockey League (WHL). A WHL West First All-Star in his only year of major junior, he scored at a goal-per-game pace with the Thunderbirds as team captain and accumulated 92 points in 54 games.

Before he could appear in an NHL game, the Colorado Avalanche traded Parrish to the Florida Panthers along with a 3rd round selection in the 1998 NHL entry draft in exchange for veteran Tom Fitzgerald. He made his debut with the Panthers in 1998–99 and established himself as an effective power forward in the NHL, scoring 24 goals and 37 points as a rookie.

After two seasons with the Panthers, Parrish was sent to the New York Islanders with left wing Oleg Kvasha in exchange for future superstars Roberto Luongo and Olli Jokinen. His production dipped to 17 goals and 30 points in his first season with the Islanders, before emerging with a career-high 30 goals, 30 assists and 60 points in 2001–02. His career-year also included an appearance in the 2002 NHL All-Star Game. In the off-season, he was re-signed to a two-year contract by the Islanders. Parrish continued to score in the 20-goal range and re-signed again with the Islanders following the 2003–04 season, but was inactive during 2004–05 due to the NHL lockout. When NHL play was set to resume the following season, Parrish signed another one-year contract worth $1.9 million on September 12, 2005.

At the 2005–06 trade deadline, he was dealt to the Los Angeles Kings along with Brent Sopel for Jeff Tambellini and Denis Grebeshkov. As his one-year contract expired at the end of that season, he became an unrestricted free agent on July 1, 2006, and signed with his home-state team, the Minnesota Wild to a five-year, $13.25 million contract. Parrish played two seasons with the Wild and was given the captaincy on three occasions as part of the team's monthly rotation. However, he could not match his previous production with the Islanders. On July 30, 2008, the final three years of Parrish's contract was bought out in order to clear salary cap space and he became a free agent.

Without an NHL team, Parrish signed with the Bridgeport Sound Tigers of the American Hockey League (AHL) on a 25-game tryout basis on October 22. Soon thereafter, however, the Dallas Stars signed Parrish to a 1-year, two-way contract on November 3. He made an immediate impact in his Stars debut on November 7, recording a hat trick in a 5–2 win against the Anaheim Ducks.

Not re-signed by the Stars for the 2009–10 season, Parrish was invited to training camp on a tryout by the Vancouver Canucks on September 11, 2009. He was released two weeks later on September 25. On October 10, 2009, it was reported that Parrish had signed with the Norfolk Admirals of the AHL. Providing offensive support and a veteran presence Parrish was signed to a one-year contract by the Admirals NHL affiliate, the Tampa Bay Lightning on February 8, 2010.

On September 17, 2010, it was announced that he would be heading to Buffalo for a tryout with the Sabres. He was released from his tryout on October 2, 2010. He was signed by Buffalo on October 6 and sent their AHL affiliate, the Portland Pirates. After spending the season with the Pirates without being recalled, Parrish was recalled by the Buffalo Sabres on February 8, 2011.

On July 8, 2011, he was signed by the Ottawa Senators to a two-way contract, one-year contract. Parrish did not appear in a game with Ottawa, as he was reassigned from training camp to their AHL affiliate, the Binghamton Senators, for the duration of the 2011–12 season. In his last professional campaign Parrish scored 15 goals and 30 points in 51 games, while also serving as team captain.

Following that season, Parrish ended his playing career and served as a color analyst for his alma mater, St. Cloud State, on television with Fox-9's Jim Rich.

On June 11, 2015, Parrish was hired as the new head coach of the high school boys hockey team in Orono, Minnesota. Parrish and Assistant Coach Will Scholz switched roles in 2017, allowing Parrish to pursue a career in broadcasting for the New York Islanders. Under Scholz, Orono went on to win the 2018 Minnesota State High School League Championship by defeating Alexandria 2–1, with Parrish broadcasting the game.

== International play ==
Along with New York Islanders teammates Rick DiPietro and Jason Blake, Parrish played for Team USA at the Winter Olympics held in Turin, Italy, in February 2006. The team was led by Peter Laviolette, Parrish's former coach with the Islanders. Team USA finished a disappointing 1–4–1, gaining its only win over Kazakhstan and eventually losing to Finland in the quarterfinals.

== Personal life ==
Parrish and his wife were married on June 18, 2004.

On July 30 2024, in a post on the social media platform X, Parrish shared that he had celebrated 4 years of sobriety the day prior. Mark and his wife Nicholle have two children, Gianna and Turner. They live in Minnesota.

== Career statistics ==
=== Regular season and playoffs ===
			Regular season					Playoffs
Season	Team	League	GP	G	A	Pts	PIM	GP	G	A	Pts	PIM
1994–95	Bloomington Jefferson High School	HS-MN	27	40	20	60	42	—	—	—	—	—
1995–96	St. Cloud State University	WCHA	39	15	15	30	30	—	—	—	—	—
1996–97	St. Cloud State University	WCHA	35	27	15	42	60	—	—	—	—	—
1997–98	Seattle Thunderbirds	WHL	54	54	38	92	29	5	2	3	5	2
1997–98	Beast of New Haven	AHL	1	1	0	1	2	—	—	—	—	—
1998–99	Beast of New Haven	AHL	2	1	0	1	0	—	—	—	—	—
1998–99	Florida Panthers	NHL	73	24	13	37	25	—	—	—	—	—
1999–2000	Florida Panthers	NHL	81	26	18	44	39	4	0	1	1	0
2000–01	New York Islanders	NHL	70	17	13	30	28	—	—	—	—	—
2001–02	New York Islanders	NHL	78	30	30	60	32	7	2	1	3	6
2002–03	New York Islanders	NHL	81	23	25	48	28	5	1	0	1	4
2003–04	New York Islanders	NHL	59	24	11	35	18	5	1	2	3	0
2005–06	New York Islanders	NHL	57	24	17	41	16	—	—	—	—	—
2005–06	Los Angeles Kings	NHL	19	5	3	8	4	—	—	—	—	—
2006–07	Minnesota Wild	NHL	76	19	20	39	18	5	1	0	1	0
2007–08	Minnesota Wild	NHL	66	16	14	30	16	1	0	0	0	0
2008–09	Bridgeport Sound Tigers	AHL	3	1	1	2	2	—	—	—	—	—
2008–09	Dallas Stars	NHL	44	8	5	13	18	—	—	—	—	—
2009–10	Norfolk Admirals	AHL	56	17	21	38	32	—	—	—	—	—
2009–10	Tampa Bay Lightning	NHL	16	0	2	2	4	—	—	—	—	—
2010–11	Portland Pirates	AHL	56	17	34	51	12	12	3	3	6	0
2010–11	Buffalo Sabres	NHL	2	0	0	0	0	—	—	—	—	—
2011–12	Binghamton Senators	AHL	51	15	15	30	12	—	—	—	—	—
NHL totals			722	216	171	387	246	27	5	4	9	10

=== International ===
Year	Team	Event	Result	GP	G	A	Pts	PIM
1996	United States	WJC	5th	6	1	3	4	2
1997	United States	WJC	2nd place, silver medalist(s)	6	5	2	7	8
1998	United States	WC	12th	6	0	0	0	4
2001	United States	WC	4th	4	1	0	1	2
2005	United States	WC	6th	6	5	0	5	6
2006	United States	OG	8th	6	0	0	0	4
Junior totals				12	6	5	11	10
Senior totals				22	6	0	6	16

== Awards and honors ==
Award	Year	Ref
NCAA
AHCA West Second-Team All-American	1996–97	
WHL
West First All-Star Team	1998	
NHL
All-Star Game	2002	

Sporting positions
Preceded by Brian Rolston	Minnesota Wild captain February–April 2007	Succeeded by Pavol Demitra
Preceded by Brian Rolston	Minnesota Wild captain December 2007	Succeeded by Nick Schultz
