= Sergei Samsonov =

Russian ice hockey player (born 1978)

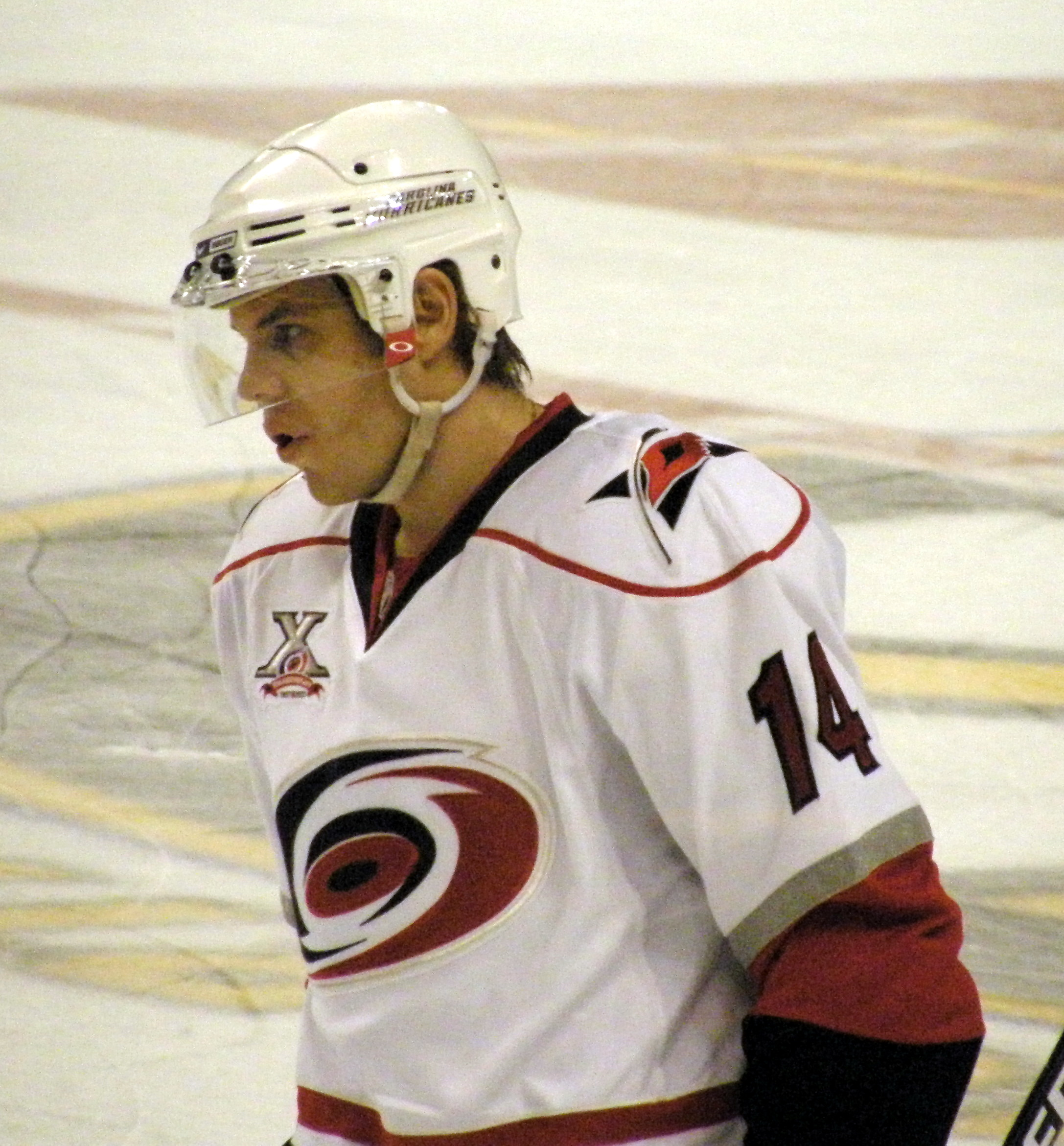
- Samsonov with the Carolina Hurricanes in 2008
- Born: October 27, 1978 (age 47) Moscow, Russian SFSR, Soviet Union
- Height: 5 ft 8 in (173 cm)
- Weight: 188 lb (85 kg; 13 st 6 lb)
- Position: Left wing
- Shot: Right
- Played for: Boston Bruins; Edmonton Oilers; Montreal Canadiens; Chicago Blackhawks; Carolina Hurricanes; Florida Panthers; CSKA Moscow; Dynamo Moscow
- National team: Russia
- NHL draft: 8th overall, 1997; Boston Bruins
- Playing career: 1994–2011

Sergei Viktorovich Samsonov (Russian: Серге́й Ви́кторович Самсо́нов; born October 27, 1978) is a Russian former professional ice hockey forward who is now director of player development for sports management group, Gold Star Hockey. He played in the NHL with six teams from 1997 to 2011, most notably for the Boston Bruins. Internationally Samsonov played for the Russian national team in several tournaments, including the 2002 Winter Olympics, where he won a bronze medal.

== Playing career ==
As a youth, Samsonov played in the 1992 Quebec International Pee-Wee Hockey Tournament with a team from Moscow.

Samsonov was drafted by the Boston Bruins eighth overall in the 1997 NHL entry draft. Boston drafted Joe Thornton first overall in the same draft. In his rookie year, Samsonov won the Calder Memorial Trophy as the league's best rookie after scoring 22 goals and a total of 47 points. In the 2000–01 season, he played in his only NHL All-Star Game in Denver.

Before playing in the NHL, Samsonov represented Russia in 1996 and 1997 at the World Junior Hockey Championships. He led the 1997 Russian team to a bronze medal and was named the tournament's most outstanding forward after scoring six goals in six games. He later played for Russia in 2002 at the Winter Olympics in Salt Lake City, earning a bronze medal.

In his early career, Samsonov was a highly touted prospect as the next future star of international hockey as he wowed fans and scouts alike with his shifty turns and scoring prowess. Samsonov scored 110 goals in 50 games with the Red Army junior team in 1994–95. That was prior to moving up to the Elite team later that season. He had 23 goals, 19 assists for a total of 42 points with 26 PIM in 64 career games with the Red Army elite team. In 1996–97, he played for the Detroit Vipers of the International Hockey League, and won the Garry F. Longman Memorial Trophy as the league's Rookie of the Year. He also won the league championship, the Turner Cup, with the Vipers. Samsonov is the only player in history to ever win the rookie of the year award for the IHL and the NHL in back-to-back seasons.

Samsonov scored his first NHL goal on October 25, 1997. It occurred in Boston's 5-4 loss to the Florida Panthers.

On March 9, 2006, Samsonov was traded from Boston to the Edmonton Oilers for Marty Reasoner, Yan Stastny, and a second-round pick in the 2006 NHL entry draft (Milan Lucic). He was part of the Oilers team that made it to the 2006 Stanley Cup Finals.

On July 12, 2006, Samsonov signed with the Montreal Canadiens for a two-year contract worth $7.05 million. Through a lackluster season, the Canadiens placed Samsonov on waivers in February 2007, and traded him to the Chicago Blackhawks for Jassen Cullimore and Tony Salmelainen in June 2007.

On January 3, 2008, the Blackhawks assigned Samsonov to the Rockford IceHogs of the American Hockey League (AHL) after he cleared waivers.

On January 8, 2008, the Carolina Hurricanes claimed Samsonov off re-entry waivers. He recorded his first point as a Hurricane on January 12, 2008, against the Colorado Avalanche and scored his first goal three days later in a three-point game against the Toronto Maple Leafs.

On April 16, 2008, the Hurricanes announced that they had reached an agreement with Samsonov for a three-year contract worth $7.6 million. The deal paid Samsonov $2.3 million in 2008–09, $2.5 million in 2009–10 and $2.8 million in 2010–11.

At the 2011 trade deadline, Samsonov was traded to the Florida Panthers, where he played 20 games.

In 2014, Samsonov became a scout for the Carolina Hurricanes, and in 2017 they hired him to train their forwards. In July 2023, Samsonov announced that he was leaving Carolina. After leaving the Hurricanes, he became the director of player development for Gold Star Management Group aka Gold Star Hockey.

In 2023, he would be named one of the top 100 Bruins players of all time.

== Career statistics ==
=== Regular season and playoffs ===
			Regular season					Playoffs
Season	Team	League	GP	G	A	Pts	PIM	GP	G	A	Pts	PIM
1994–95	CSKA–2 Moscow	RUS-2	4	3	2	5	0	—	—	—	—	—
1994–95	CSKA Moscow	RUS	13	2	2	4	14	2	0	0	0	0
1995–96	CSKA Moscow	RUS	51	21	17	38	12	3	1	1	2	4
1996–97	Detroit Vipers	IHL	73	29	35	64	18	19	8	4	12	12
1997–98	Boston Bruins	NHL	81	22	25	47	8	6	2	5	7	0
1998–99	Boston Bruins	NHL	79	25	26	51	18	11	3	1	4	0
1999–00	Boston Bruins	NHL	77	19	26	45	4	—	—	—	—	—
2000–01	Boston Bruins	NHL	82	29	46	75	18	—	—	—	—	—
2001–02	Boston Bruins	NHL	74	29	41	70	27	6	2	2	4	0
2002–03	Boston Bruins	NHL	8	5	6	11	2	5	0	2	2	0
2003–04	Boston Bruins	NHL	58	17	23	40	4	7	2	5	7	0
2004–05	Dynamo Moscow	RSL	3	1	0	1	0	3	1	2	3	0
2005–06	Boston Bruins	NHL	55	18	19	37	22	—	—	—	—	—
2005–06	Edmonton Oilers	NHL	19	5	11	16	6	24	4	11	15	14
2006–07	Montreal Canadiens	NHL	63	9	17	26	10	—	—	—	—	—
2007–08	Chicago Blackhawks	NHL	23	0	4	4	6	—	—	—	—	—
2007–08	Carolina Hurricanes	NHL	38	14	18	32	10	—	—	—	—	—
2007–08	Rockford IceHogs	AHL	2	1	0	1	0	—	—	—	—	—
2008–09	Carolina Hurricanes	NHL	81	16	32	48	28	17	5	3	8	6
2009–10	Carolina Hurricanes	NHL	72	14	15	29	32	—	—	—	—	—
2010–11	Carolina Hurricanes	NHL	58	10	16	26	12	—	—	—	—	—
2010–11	Florida Panthers	NHL	20	3	11	14	2	—	—	—	—	—
NHL totals			888	235	336	571	209	76	18	29	47	20

=== International ===
Medal record

Ice hockey

Representing Russia

Olympic Games
Bronze medal – third place	2002 Salt Lake City	

World Junior Championship
Bronze medal – third place	1996 United States	
Bronze medal – third place	1997 Switzerland	

European Junior Championship
Gold medal – first place	1996 Russia	

Year	Team	Event	GP	G	A	Pts	PIM
1995	Russia	EJC	5	2	4	6	0
1996	Russia	EJC	5	3	2	5	4
1996	Russia	WJC	7	4	2	6	0
1997	Russia	WJC	6	6	1	7	0
2002	Russia	OLY	6	1	2	3	4
2004	Russia	WCH	4	1	2	3	0
Junior totals			23	15	9	24	4
Senior totals			10	2	4	6	4

Awards and achievements
Preceded by Joe Thornton	Boston Bruins first-round draft pick 1997	Succeeded by Nick Boynton
Preceded by Bryan Berard	Winner of the Calder Memorial Trophy; 1998	Succeeded by Chris Drury
