= Marc Denis =

Canadian ice hockey player (born 1977)

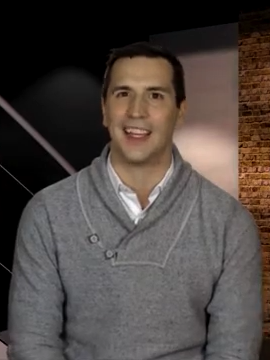
- Denis in 2016
- Born: August 1, 1977 (age 49) Montreal, Quebec, Canada
- Height: 6 ft 1 in (185 cm)
- Weight: 193 lb (88 kg; 13 st 11 lb)
- Position: Goaltender
- Caught: Left
- Played for: Colorado Avalanche; Columbus Blue Jackets; Tampa Bay Lightning; Montreal Canadiens
- National team: Canada
- NHL draft: 25th overall, 1995; Colorado Avalanche
- Playing career: 1997–2009

Joseph Marc Denis (born August 1, 1977) is a Canadian former professional ice hockey goaltender, who last played with the Montreal Canadiens of the National Hockey League (NHL). For the 2009–10 season, he was hired as the goaltenders' coach of the Chicoutimi Saguenéens, a Quebec Major Junior Hockey League (QMJHL) team. He is currently working as a colour analyst for the Canadiens on the Francophone Canadian sports network RDS, working alongside Pierre Houde. He is the all time leader in save percentage in the shootout among goaltenders who have faced at least 40 shootout attempts.

== Playing career ==
In his youth, Denis played in the 1990 and 1991 Quebec International Pee-Wee Hockey Tournaments with a minor ice hockey team from Montreal.

Denis was drafted 25th overall by the Colorado Avalanche at the 1995 NHL entry draft. Upon turning professional with Colorado, Denis mainly played for Colorado's American Hockey League (AHL) affiliate, the Hershey Bears, and played a total of 28 regular season games in three seasons for the Avalanche. On June 7, 2000, Denis was traded to the Columbus Blue Jackets for a second-round pick in the 2000 draft (used to choose Tomas Kurka). During the 2002–03 NHL season, he set the then-NHL record for most minutes in a season with 4,511, playing 77 regular season games that season.

On June 30, 2006, Denis was traded to the Tampa Bay Lightning for Fredrik Modin and Fredrik Norrena. In the 2007–08 season, on December 28, due to his sub-par and inconsistent play, the Lightning waived Denis. After he cleared waivers, Denis was sent down to the Lightning's AHL affiliate, the Norfolk Admirals. The Lightning later recalled Denis from Norfolk on March 26, 2008. Denis replaced goalie Jonathan Boutin, who was earlier recalled from the Admirals on an emergency basis because starting goalie Mike Smith had a sprained left ankle. After the season, Denis was bought out from the Lightning on June 25, 2008.

Denis, who therefore became a free agent, then signed a contract with his hometown team, the Montreal Canadiens, on July 3, 2008. After training camp, Marc Denis was assigned to Montreal's AHL affiliate, the Hamilton Bulldogs. Denis was recalled as an injury replacement for the Canadiens throughout the season and appeared in one game with the Canadiens when he relieved Jaroslav Halak for the third period in a 4–1 loss to the New Jersey Devils on January 2, 2009.

== Career statistics ==
=== Regular season and playoffs ===
			Regular season										Playoffs
Season	Team	League	GP	W	L	T	OTL	MIN	GA	SO	GAA	SV%	GP	W	L	MIN	GA	SO	GAA	SV%
1992–93	Montreal-Bourassa	QMAAA	26	—	—	—	—	1559	74	5	2.87	—	—	—	—	—	—	—	—	—
1993–94	Trois-Rivières Estacades	QMAAA	36	10	22	3	—	2093	158	0	4.53	—	4	1	3	249	20	0	4.83	—
1994–95	Chicoutimi Saguenéens	QMJHL	32	17	9	1	—	1688	98	0	3.48	.891	6	4	2	372	19	1	3.06	.917
1995–96	Chicoutimi Saguenéens	QMJHL	51	23	21	4	—	2951	157	2	3.19	.891	16	8	8	957	69	0	4.32	.865
1996–97	Chicoutimi Saguenéens	QMJHL	41	22	15	2	—	2317	104	4	2.69	.905	21	11	10	1229	70	1	3.42	.883
1996–97	Chicoutimi Saguenéens	MC	—	—	—	—	—	—	—	—	—	—	3	0	3	179	15	0	5.02	.832
1996–97	Colorado Avalanche	NHL	1	0	1	0	—	60	3	0	3.00	.885	—	—	—	—	—	—	—	—
1996–97	Hershey Bears	AHL	—	—	—	—	—	—	—	—	—	—	4	1	0	56	1	0	1.08	.960
1997–98	Hershey Bears	AHL	47	17	23	4	—	2588	125	1	2.90	.899	6	3	3	346	15	0	2.59	.894
1998–99	Hershey Bears	AHL	52	20	23	5	—	2908	137	4	2.83	.914	3	1	1	143	7	0	2.93	.909
1998–99	Colorado Avalanche	NHL	4	1	1	1	—	217	9	0	2.49	.918	—	—	—	—	—	—	—	—
1999–00	Colorado Avalanche	NHL	23	9	8	3	—	1203	51	3	2.54	.917	—	—	—	—	—	—	—	—
2000–01	Columbus Blue Jackets	NHL	32	6	20	4	—	1830	99	0	3.25	.895	—	—	—	—	—	—	—	—
2001–02	Columbus Blue Jackets	NHL	42	9	24	5	—	2335	121	1	3.11	.899	—	—	—	—	—	—	—	—
2002–03	Columbus Blue Jackets	NHL	77	27	41	8	—	4511	232	5	3.09	.903	—	—	—	—	—	—	—	—
2003–04	Columbus Blue Jackets	NHL	66	21	36	7	—	3795	162	5	2.56	.918	—	—	—	—	—	—	—	—
2005–06	Columbus Blue Jackets	NHL	49	21	25	—	1	2786	151	1	3.25	.900	—	—	—	—	—	—	—	—
2006–07	Tampa Bay Lightning	NHL	44	17	18	—	2	2353	125	1	3.19	.883	—	—	—	—	—	—	—	—
2007–08	Tampa Bay Lightning	NHL	10	1	5	—	0	414	28	0	4.05	.859	—	—	—	—	—	—	—	—
2007–08	Norfolk Admirals	AHL	32	11	17	—	2	1832	89	1	2.91	.910	—	—	—	—	—	—	—	—
2008–09	Hamilton Bulldogs	AHL	46	27	18	—	0	2659	109	5	2.46	.920	6	2	4	359	20	0	3.34	.890
2008–09	Montreal Canadiens	NHL	1	0	0	—	0	20	1	0	3.00	.857	—	—	—	—	—	—	—	—
NHL totals			349	112	179	28	3	19,526	982	16	3.02	.902	—	—	—	—	—	—	—	—

=== International ===
Medal record

Representing Canada

Ice hockey

World Championships
Gold medal – first place	2004 Prague	

World Junior Championships
Gold medal – first place	1996 Boston	
Gold medal – first place	1997 Geneva	

Year	Team	Event	GP	W	L	T	MIN	GA	SO	GAA	SV%
1996	Canada	WJC	2	2	0	0	120	2	0	1.00	—
1997	Canada	WJC	7	5	0	2	419	13	1	1.86	.933
2006	Canada	WC	5	4	1	0	263	11	0	2.51	.911
Junior totals			9	7	0	2	539	15	1	1.67	—
Senior totals			5	4	1	0	263	11	0	2.51	.911

== Awards and honours ==
Award	Year
QMJHL
Marcel Robert Trophy	1996
Jacques Plante Memorial Trophy	1997
CHL First All-Star Team	1997
CHL Goaltender of the Year	1997
AHL
Calder Cup (Hershey Bears)	1997
International
Best Goaltender	1997

Awards and achievements
Preceded by None	Colorado Avalanche first-round draft pick 1995	Succeeded by Peter Ratchuk
