= Brad Isbister =

Canadian ice hockey player (born 1977)

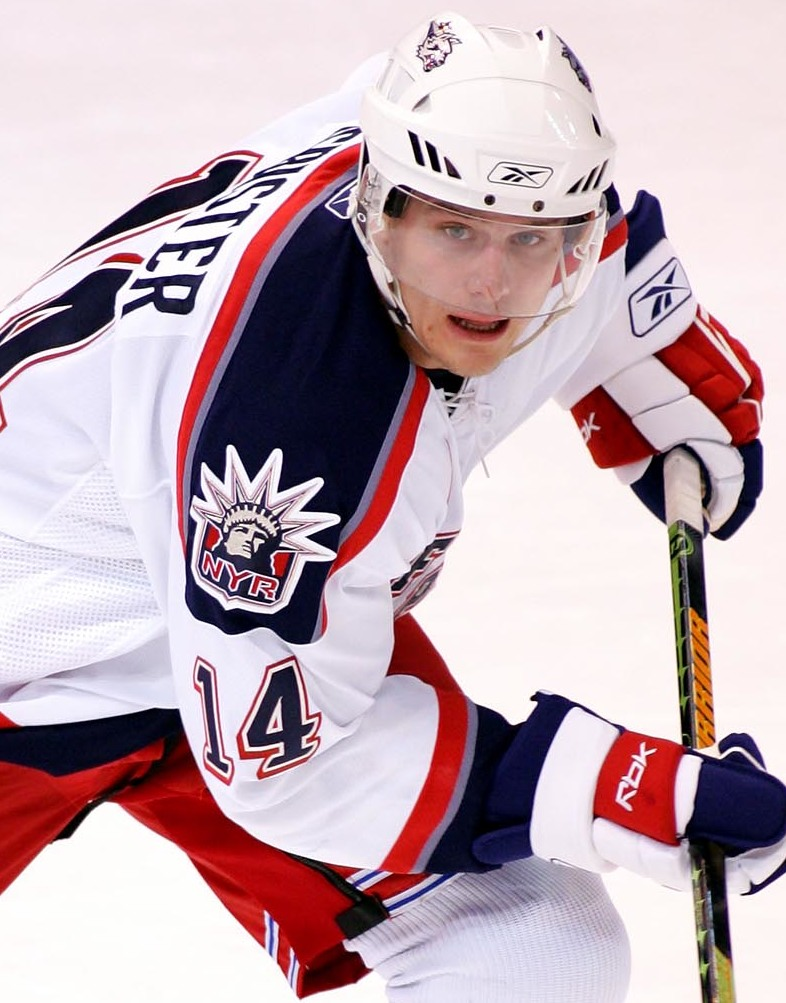
- Isbister with the Hartford Wolf Pack in 2006
- Born: May 7, 1977 (age 49) Edmonton, Alberta, Canada
- Height: 6 ft 4 in (193 cm)
- Weight: 231 lb (105 kg; 16 st 7 lb)
- Position: Left wing
- Shot: Right
- Played for: Phoenix Coyotes; New York Islanders; Edmonton Oilers; HC TWK Innsbruck; Boston Bruins; New York Rangers; Vancouver Canucks; EV Zug
- National team: Canada
- NHL draft: 67th overall, 1995; Winnipeg Jets
- Playing career: 1997–2009

Brad Isbister (born May 7, 1977) is a Canadian former professional ice hockey left winger who played 541 regular season games in the National Hockey League (NHL).

== Playing career ==
Isbister grew up in Calgary, Alberta, and played junior hockey with the Calgary Canucks of the Alberta Junior Hockey League, recording 49 points in 35 games in 1992–93. The following season, he began his career in the Western Hockey League with the Portland Winter Hawks. After a 16-goal, 36-point season in 1994–95, he was drafted in the third round, 67th overall, by the Winnipeg Jets in the 1995 NHL entry draft. Upon being drafted, he returned to the Winter Hawks and recorded 89 points, as well as a team-high 45 goals. In his final year with the Winter Hawks, Isbister recorded 33 points in 24 games and was named to the WHL West Second All-Star Team. That season, he also competed for the Team Canada at the 1997 World Junior Championships and made his professional debut with the Springfield Falcons of the AHL, appearing in 7 games.

Isbister played his first NHL game on October 1, 1997, for the Phoenix Coyotes (formerly the Winnipeg Jets) against the Chicago Blackhawks. His first NHL point was an assist, in a 3–2 Phoenix win over the Colorado Avalanche on October 11. He scored his first NHL goal ten days later on October 21, in a 4–3 loss to the Mighty Ducks of Anaheim. Isbister finished his rookie season with 17 points in 66 games. After his second season with the Coyotes, Isbister was traded to the New York Islanders on March 20, 1999, with a third round draft pick (Brian Collins) in 1999 for Robert Reichel, a third round draft pick (Jason Jaspers) in 1999 and a fourth round draft pick (via Ottawa; Phoenix selected Preston Mizzi) in 1999.

In his first season with the Islanders, 1999–2000, Isbister recorded a career-high 22 goals, 20 assists, and 42 points in 64 games. He continued at that pace in New York until March 11, 2003, as he was traded to the Edmonton Oilers with Raffi Torres for Janne Niinimaa and a second round draft pick (via Washington; New York selected Evgeni Tunik) in 2003.

In Isbister's first season with the Oilers, in 2003–04, his points total dipped to 18. After spending the locked out 2004–05 season playing for HC TWK Innsbruck of the Austrian Hockey League, Isbister was traded from Edmonton to the Boston Bruins on August 1, 2005, in exchange for a fourth round draft pick (later traded back to Boston; later traded to San Jose; San Jose selected James DeLory) in 2006.

Isbister recorded 23 points as NHL play resumed in 2005–06, his only season with Boston. The following summer, he was picked up by the Carolina Hurricanes as a free agent on August 30, 2006, but was traded to the New York Rangers a month into the season in exchange for Jakub Petruzalek and a conditional fifth-round draft choice in 2008. With New York, Isbister spent the majority of the 2006–07 season with the Hartford Wolf Pack, the Rangers' AHL affiliate.

Following his only season with the Rangers organization, Isbister signed a one-year, $525,000 contract with the Vancouver Canucks. Isbister only played 55 games with Vancouver due to injuries and staff decisions.

In 2008, he was not re-signed and was picked up by the Ottawa Senators, signing a two-way, one-year contract on September 4, 2008. At the end of training camp, Isbister was assigned to Ottawa's AHL affiliate, the Binghamton Senators. However, he instead went overseas to play for EV Zug of the Swiss Nationalliga A and on September 27, 2009, retired as an active player and went into coaching.

== International play ==
Medal record

Representing Canada

Ice hockey

World Junior Championships
| Gold medal – first place | 1997 | Switzerland |

Isbister first played internationally with Team Canada at the 1997 World Junior Championships. He scored 7 points in 7 games, tied for seventh in tournament scoring, as Canada captured their fifth straight gold medal. Isbister scored the final goal of the 2–0 victory over the United States in the gold medal game.

Three years later, Isbister made his senior international debut, competing in the 2000 World Championships. He scored 7 points in 9 games for Team Canada, but they were defeated in the semi-finals by the Czech Republic, then lost the bronze medal game to Finland.

Isbister competed for Canada for the second consecutive year in the 2001 World Championships and scored 5 goals in 7 games. Canada was once again held from a medal as they were eliminated in the quarter-finals by the United States.

== Coaching career ==
On September 27, 2009, the University of Calgary's head hockey coach, Mark Howell, announced that Isbister would be an assistant coach along with former NHL player Cory Cross. He coached for one season with the Dinos.

== Career statistics ==
=== Regular season and playoffs ===
| | | | Regular season | | | | | Playoffs |
| Season | Team | League | GP | G | A | Pts | PIM | GP | G | A | Pts | PIM |
|---|---|---|---|---|---|---|---|---|---|---|---|---|
| 1992–93 | Calgary Canucks | AJHL | 35 | 24 | 25 | 49 | 74 | — | — | — | — | — |
| 1993–94 | Portland Winter Hawks | WHL | 64 | 7 | 10 | 17 | 45 | 10 | 0 | 2 | 2 | 0 |
| 1994–95 | Portland Winter Hawks | WHL | 67 | 16 | 20 | 36 | 123 | — | — | — | — | — |
| 1995–96 | Portland Winter Hawks | WHL | 71 | 45 | 44 | 89 | 184 | 7 | 2 | 4 | 6 | 20 |
| 1996–97 | Portland Winter Hawks | WHL | 24 | 15 | 18 | 33 | 45 | 6 | 2 | 1 | 3 | 16 |
| 1996–97 | Springfield Falcons | AHL | 7 | 3 | 1 | 4 | 14 | 9 | 1 | 2 | 3 | 10 |
| 1997–98 | Springfield Falcons | AHL | 9 | 8 | 2 | 10 | 36 | — | — | — | — | — |
| 1997–98 | Phoenix Coyotes | NHL | 66 | 9 | 8 | 17 | 102 | 5 | 0 | 0 | 0 | 2 |
| 1998–99 | Phoenix Coyotes | NHL | 32 | 4 | 4 | 8 | 46 | — | — | — | — | — |
| 1998–99 | Springfield Falcons | AHL | 4 | 1 | 1 | 2 | 12 | — | — | — | — | — |
| 1998–99 | Las Vegas Thunder | IHL | 2 | 0 | 0 | 0 | 9 | — | — | — | — | — |
| 1999–00 | New York Islanders | NHL | 64 | 22 | 20 | 42 | 100 | — | — | — | — | — |
| 2000–01 | New York Islanders | NHL | 51 | 18 | 14 | 32 | 59 | — | — | — | — | — |
| 2001–02 | New York Islanders | NHL | 79 | 17 | 21 | 38 | 113 | 3 | 1 | 1 | 2 | 17 |
| 2002–03 | New York Islanders | NHL | 53 | 10 | 13 | 23 | 34 | — | — | — | — | — |
| 2002–03 | Edmonton Oilers | NHL | 13 | 3 | 2 | 5 | 9 | 6 | 0 | 1 | 1 | 12 |
| 2003–04 | Edmonton Oilers | NHL | 51 | 10 | 8 | 18 | 54 | — | — | — | — | — |
| 2004–05 | HC TWK Innsbruck | EBEL | 11 | 7 | 4 | 11 | 41 | 5 | 3 | 1 | 4 | 6 |
| 2005–06 | Boston Bruins | NHL | 58 | 6 | 17 | 23 | 46 | — | — | — | — | — |
| 2006–07 | Albany River Rats | AHL | 9 | 3 | 5 | 8 | 54 | — | — | — | — | — |
| 2006–07 | Hartford Wolf Pack | AHL | 34 | 12 | 8 | 20 | 22 | — | — | — | — | — |
| 2006–07 | New York Rangers | NHL | 19 | 1 | 4 | 5 | 14 | 4 | 0 | 0 | 0 | 2 |
| 2007–08 | Vancouver Canucks | NHL | 55 | 6 | 5 | 11 | 38 | — | — | — | — | — |
| 2008–09 | EV Zug | NLA | 24 | 10 | 7 | 17 | 55 | 3 | 1 | 1 | 2 | 12 |
| NHL totals | | | 541 | 106 | 116 | 222 | 615 | 18 | 1 | 2 | 3 | 33 |

=== International ===
| Year | Team | Event | Result | GP | G | A | Pts | PIM |
|---|---|---|---|---|---|---|---|---|
| 1997 | Canada | WJC | 1st place, gold medalist(s) | 7 | 4 | 3 | 7 | 8 |
| 2000 | Canada | WC | 4th | 9 | 4 | 3 | 7 | 18 |
| 2001 | Canada | WC | 5th | 7 | 5 | 0 | 5 | 16 |
| Junior totals | | | | 7 | 4 | 3 | 7 | 8 |
| Senior totals | | | | 16 | 9 | 3 | 12 | 34 |

== Awards and achievements ==
- Gold medal (World Junior Championships with Team Canada) - 1997
- WHL West Second All-Star Team - 1997
