= Oleg Kvasha =

Russian ice hockey player (born 1978)

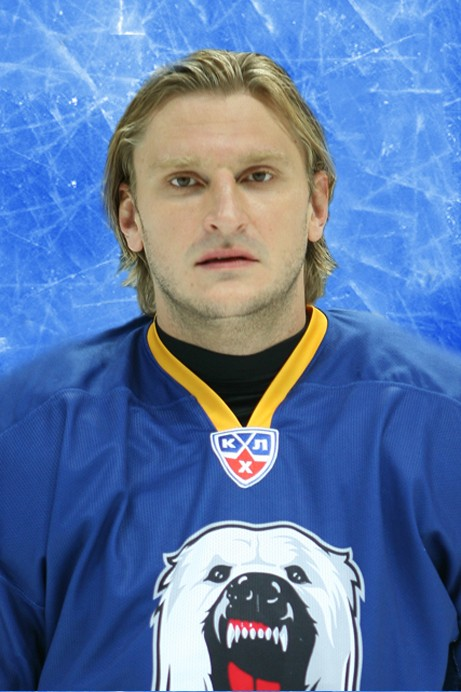
- Born: July 26, 1978 (age 47) Moscow, Russian SFSR, Soviet Union
- Height: 6 ft 5 in (196 cm)
- Weight: 229 lb (104 kg; 16 st 5 lb)
- Position: Centre
- Shot: Right
- Played for: CSKA Moscow; Florida Panthers; New York Islanders; Severstal Cherepovets; Phoenix Coyotes; HC Vityaz; Traktor Chelyabinsk; Atlant Moscow Oblast; Metallurg Magnitogorsk; Neftekhimik Nizhnekamsk; Avangard Omsk; Spartak Moscow; Barys Astana
- National team: Russia
- NHL draft: 65th overall, 1996; Florida Panthers
- Playing career: 1995–2015

Oleg Vladimirovich Kvasha (Russian: Олег Владимирович Кваша; born July 26, 1978) is a Russian former professional ice hockey forward who played in the National Hockey League (NHL) with the Florida Panthers, New York Islanders and the Phoenix Coyotes.

== Playing career ==
As a youth, Kvasha played in the 1992 Quebec International Pee-Wee Hockey Tournament with a team from Moscow.

Kvasha was chosen in the third round, 65th overall, by the Florida Panthers in the 1996 NHL entry draft. He made his NHL debut with the Panthers in the 1998–99 season, appearing in 68 games as a rookie for 12 goals and 25 points.

After completing his second season with the Panthers, on June 24, 2000, Kvasha was dealt by Florida to the New York Islanders with winger Mark Parrish for goaltender Roberto Luongo and center Olli Jokinen.

After playing with the Islanders for five seasons, Kvasha was traded during the 2005–06 campaign, along with a conditional fifth round draft pick to the Phoenix Coyotes for a third round pick in the 2006 NHL entry draft on March 9, 2006.

Following his seventh season in the NHL, split between the Islanders and Coyotes, Kvasha ended his North American career in returning to his native Russia, agreeing to terms with HC Vityaz of the then Russian Superleague.

Kvasha played a further 9 years in the Kontinental Hockey League, appearing with Traktor Chelyabinsk, Atlant Moscow Oblast, Metallurg Magnitogorsk, HC Neftekhimik Nizhnekamsk, CSKA Moscow, Avangard Omsk, HC Spartak Moscow and Barys Astana before retiring after his 20th professional season in 2014–15.

== International play ==
Kvasha has represented his native Russia in the 2002 Winter Olympics in Salt Lake City, Utah, where he won a bronze medal.

== Career statistics ==
=== Regular season and playoffs ===
			Regular season					Playoffs
Season	Team	League	GP	G	A	Pts	PIM	GP	G	A	Pts	PIM
1994–95	CSKA–2 Moscow	RUS.2	10	1	1	2	2	—	—	—	—	—
1995–96	CSKA Moscow	IHL	38	2	3	5	14	2	0	0	0	0
1995–96	CSKA–2 Moscow	RUS.2	6	2	3	5	12	—	—	—	—	—
1996–97	CSKA–2 Moscow	RUS.2	21	16	15	31	55	—	—	—	—	—
1997–98	Beast of New Haven	AHL	57	13	16	29	46	3	2	1	3	0
1998–99	Florida Panthers	NHL	68	12	13	25	45	—	—	—	—	—
1999–00	Florida Panthers	NHL	78	5	20	25	34	4	0	0	0	0
2000–01	New York Islanders	NHL	62	11	9	20	46	—	—	—	—	—
2001–02	New York Islanders	NHL	71	13	25	38	80	7	0	1	1	6
2002–03	New York Islanders	NHL	69	12	14	26	44	5	0	1	1	2
2003–04	New York Islanders	NHL	81	15	36	51	48	5	1	0	1	0
2004–05	Severstal Cherepovets	RSL	22	6	5	11	24	—	—	—	—	—
2004–05	CSKA Moscow	RSL	26	3	6	9	20	—	—	—	—	—
2005–06	New York Islanders	NHL	49	9	12	21	32	—	—	—	—	—
2005–06	Phoenix Coyotes	NHL	15	4	7	11	6	—	—	—	—	—
2006–07	Vityaz Chekhov	RSL	27	7	8	15	28	1	0	0	0	0
2007–08	Vityaz Chekhov	RSL	54	20	18	38	124	—	—	—	—	—
2008–09	Traktor Chelyabinsk	KHL	52	17	18	35	56	3	0	0	0	8
2009–10	Atlant Mytishchi	KHL	46	12	8	20	30	4	0	2	2	2
2010–11	Metallurg Magnitogorsk	KHL	45	5	2	7	46	20	2	4	6	22
2011–12	Neftekhimik Nizhnekamsk	KHL	44	10	13	23	56	—	—	—	—	—
2012–13	CSKA Moscow	KHL	35	4	4	8	26	9	2	4	6	20
2013–14	Avangard Omsk	KHL	20	1	3	4	54	—	—	—	—	—
2013–14	Yermak Angarsk	RUS.2	4	2	3	5	2	—	—	—	—	—
2013–14	Spartak Moscow	KHL	24	3	3	6	24	—	—	—	—	—
2014–15	Barys Astana	KHL	20	2	0	2	8	6	0	0	0	0
IHL & RSL totals			167	38	40	78	210	2	0	0	0	0
NHL totals			493	81	136	217	335	21	1	2	3	8
KHL totals			286	54	51	105	300	42	4	10	14	52

Medal record

Representing Russia

Ice hockey

Winter Olympics
Bronze medal – third place	2002 United States	

World Junior Championships
Silver medal – second place	1998 Finland	
Bronze medal – third place	1997 Switzerland	

=== International ===
Year	Team	Event	Result	GP	G	A	Pts	PIM
1996	Russia	EJC	1st place, gold medalist(s)	5	4	2	6	6
1997	Russia	WJC	3rd place, bronze medalist(s)	6	2	0	2	4
1998	Russia	WJC	2nd place, silver medalist(s)	7	4	2	6	4
2002	Russia	OG	3rd place, bronze medalist(s)	5	0	0	0	0
2004	Russia	WCH	5th	2	0	1	1	0
Junior totals				18	10	4	14	14
Senior totals				7	0	1	1	0
