= Radmir Faizov =

Russian ice hockey goaltender

- Born: March 4, 1977 (age 48); Chelyabinsk, Russian SFSR, Soviet Union
- Height: 5 ft 9 in (175 cm)
- Weight: 165 lb (75 kg; 11 st 11 lb)
- Position: Goaltender
- Caught: Left
- Played for: Torpedo Yaroslavl
- Playing career: 1994–2008

Radmir Faizov (born March 4, 1977) is a Russian former ice hockey goaltender.

Faizov played a total of three games in the Russian Superleague for Torpedo Yaroslavl. He featured in two games during the 1996–97 season and one game during the 1997–98 season.

Faizov played in the 1997 World Junior Ice Hockey Championships for Russia.
