= Juho Jokinen =

Finnish ice hockey player

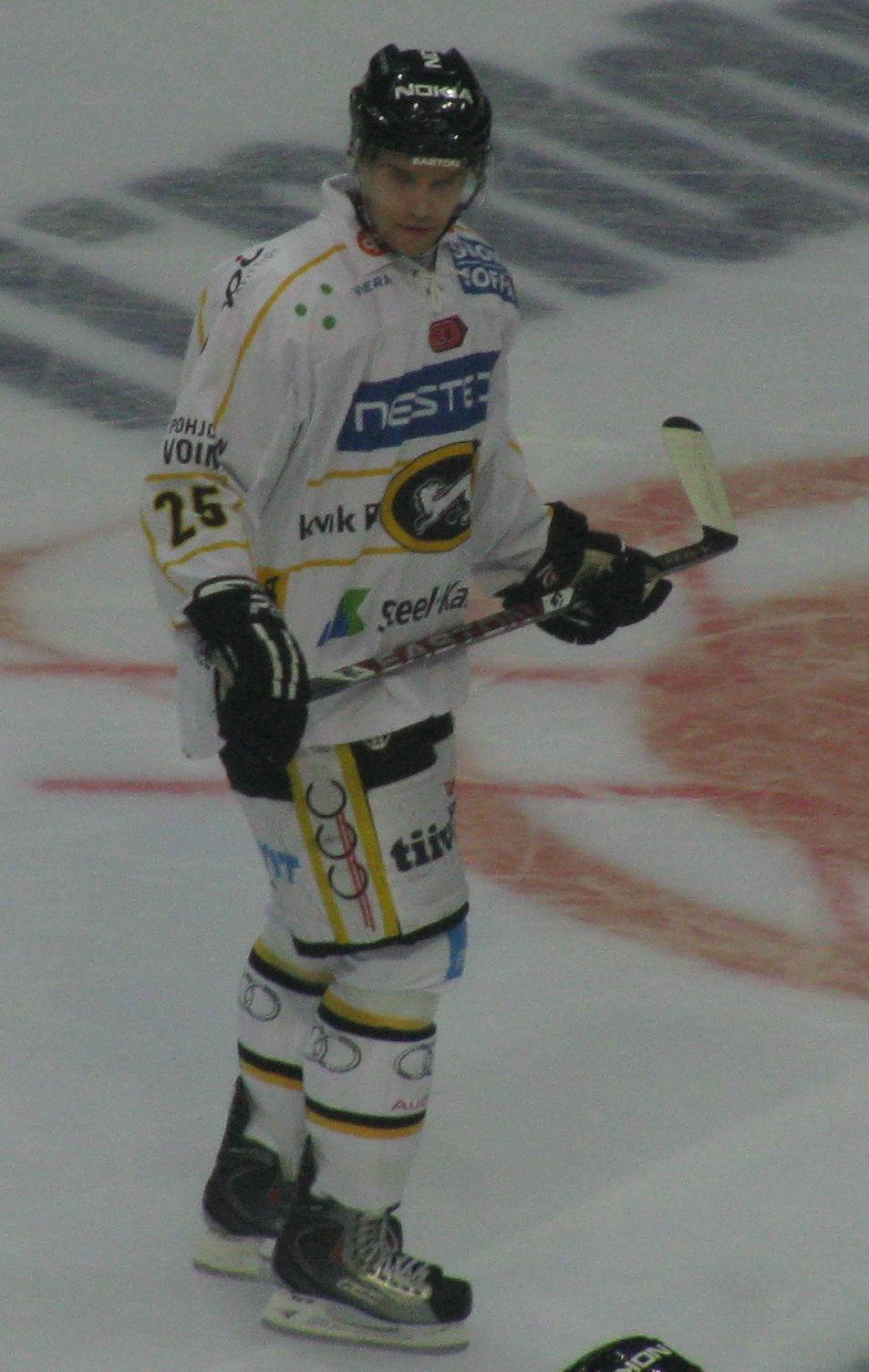
- Born: 25 July 1986 (age 40) Kalajoki, Finland
- Height: 6 ft 2 in (188 cm)
- Weight: 202 lb (92 kg; 14 st 6 lb)
- Position: Defence
- Shot: Left
- Played for: TPS Turku; Oulun Kärpät; TUTO Hockey
- Playing career: 2005–2012

Juho Jokinen (born 25 July 1986) is a Finnish former ice hockey defenceman who played professionally in Finland for Oulun Kärpät of the SM-liiga. He is the younger brother of NHL winger Jussi Jokinen.

== Career statistics ==
			Regular season					Playoffs
Season	Team	League	GP	G	A	Pts	PIM	GP	G	A	Pts	PIM
2001–02	Kokkolan Hermes U16	U16 I-divisioona	12	4	15	19	12	—	—	—	—	—
2002–03	APV U18	U18 I-divisioona	12	6	10	16	10	4	1	4	5	4
2003–04	Oulun Kärpät U18	U18 SM-sarja	30	5	8	13	18	2	0	1	1	0
2004–05	Oulun Kärpät U20	U20 SM-liiga	31	1	14	15	51	5	0	0	0	4
2005–06	HC TPS	SM-liiga	10	0	0	0	2	1	0	0	0	2
2005–06	Suomi U20	Mestis	9	2	2	4	6	—	—	—	—	—
2005–06	TUTO Hockey U20	U20 I-divisioona	3	0	0	0	0	—	—	—	—	—
2005–06	TUTO Hockey	Mestis	21	0	2	2	14	—	—	—	—	—
2006–07	HC TPS	SM-liiga	51	2	4	6	32	2	0	0	0	2
2007–08	HC TPS	SM-liiga	42	0	5	5	16	—	—	—	—	—
2007–08	Oulun Kärpät	SM-liiga	15	0	1	1	2	15	0	0	0	0
2008–09	Oulun Kärpät U20	U20 SM-liiga	1	0	0	0	0	—	—	—	—	—
2008–09	Oulun Kärpät	SM-liiga	50	2	5	7	24	1	0	0	0	0
2009–10	Oulun Kärpät	SM-liiga	39	3	5	8	20	—	—	—	—	—
2010–11	Oulun Kärpät	SM-liiga	4	0	0	0	2	—	—	—	—	—
2011–12	Oulun Kärpät	SM-liiga	7	0	1	1	6	—	—	—	—	—
2011–12	Kiekko-Laser	Mestis	—	—	—	—	—	—	—	—	—	—
SM-liiga totals			218	7	21	28	104	19	0	0	0	4
