= Ric Jackman =

Canadian ice hockey player (born 1978)

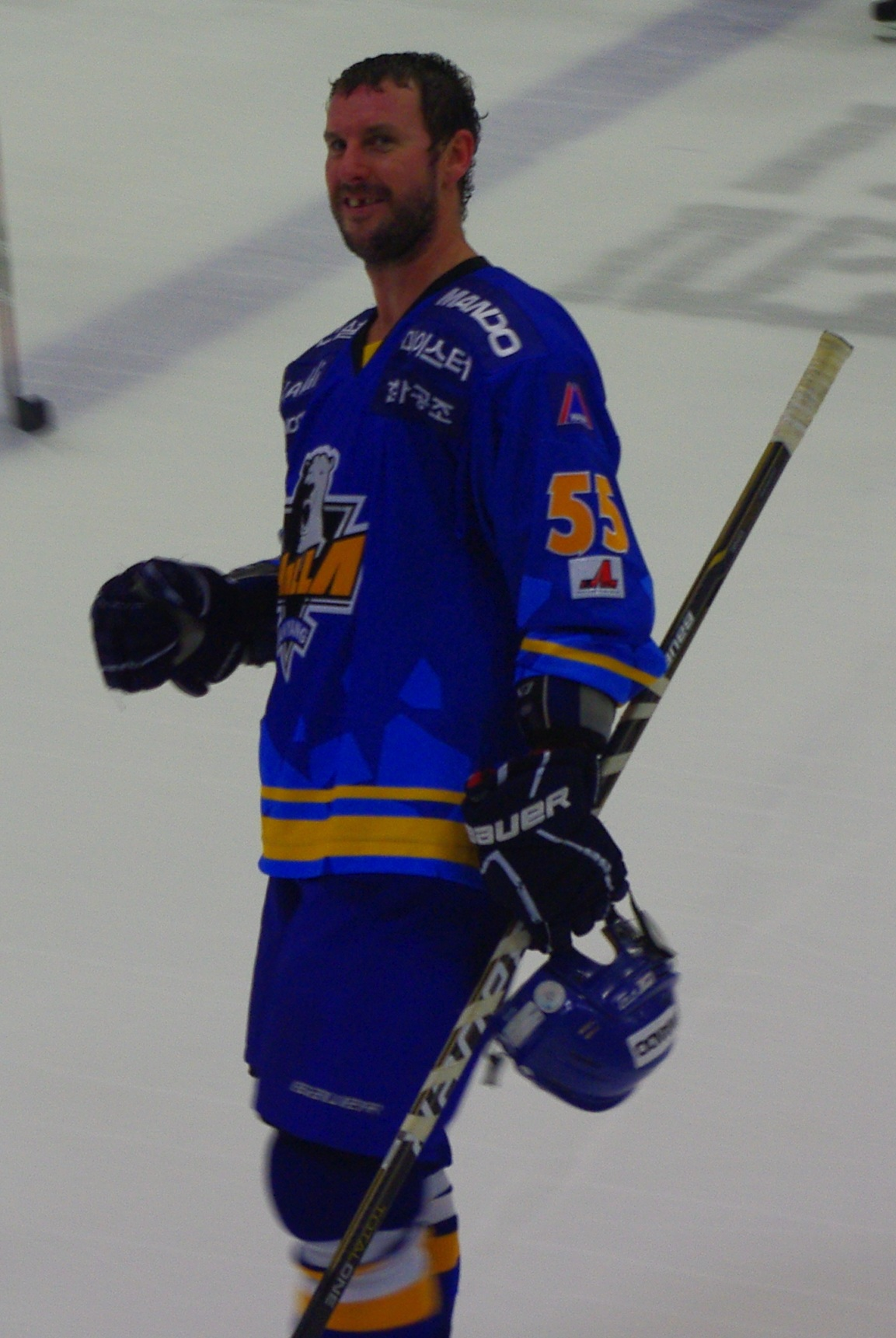
- Jackman with Anyang Halla
- Born: June 28, 1978 (age 48) Toronto, Ontario, Canada
- Height: 6 ft 2 in (188 cm)
- Weight: 220 lb (100 kg; 15 st 10 lb)
- Position: Defence
- Shot: Right
- Played for: Dallas Stars; Toronto Maple Leafs; Pittsburgh Penguins; Florida Panthers; Anaheim Ducks; EC Red Bull Salzburg; Alba Volán Székesfehérvár; EHC Biel; HC Slovan Bratislava; Anyang Halla; Nippon Paper Cranes; Braehead Clan; Fife Flyers
- NHL draft: 5th overall, 1996; Dallas Stars
- Playing career: 2000–2017
Medal record
Representing Canada
Ice hockey
World Junior Championships
Gold medal – first place	1997 Geneva/Morges

Richard Jackman (born June 28, 1978) is a Canadian former professional ice hockey defenceman who played in the National Hockey League (NHL). Jackman was born in Toronto, Ontario.

== Playing career ==
=== Junior ===
Jackman played junior hockey for the Sault Ste. Marie Greyhounds of the Ontario Hockey League (OHL) from 1996 to 1998. He played alongside future Hart Trophy and Art Ross Trophy winner Joe Thornton.

=== Professional ===
Jackman was drafted fifth overall by the Dallas Stars in the 1996 NHL entry draft. Jackman has played 231 career NHL games, scoring 19 goals and 58 assists for 77 points. His best offensive season was with the Pittsburgh Penguins in 2003–04, after coming over from the Toronto Maple Leafs; he scored 7 goals and 24 points in 25 games. He was traded by the Leafs for veteran defenceman Drake Berehowsky at the trade deadline.

During the 2004–05 NHL lockout, Jackman played for Björklöven in the Swedish Allsvenskan.

Returning to the Penguins in 2005–06, Jackman's blistering slapshot contributed to 6 goals and 22 assists, but did not stop him from being frequently benched. At the trade deadline in 2006, Jackman was traded to the Florida Panthers for Petr Tatíček and draft picks.

Jackman was traded from the Florida Panthers to the Anaheim Ducks on January 3, 2007, for a conditional pick in the 2007 NHL entry draft. He won the Stanley Cup in 2007 with the Anaheim Ducks.

After parts of five seasons in the NHL, Jackman opted to sign overseas with EC Red Bull Salzburg in Austria in the summer of 2007. He also played for Leksand of Allsvenskan in Sweden and Biel of the Swiss-A league. In 2010, he accepted a special invitation to play for the Utah Grizzlies (ECHL) prior to joining HC Slovan Bratislava in Slovak Extraliga. On December 5, 2010, Jackman signed a 2-year deal with HC Slovan Bratislava, but since the club is struggling financially, Jackman asked to waive the contract. On July 17, 2011, Jackman officially signed with Anyang Halla of ALH for a 3-year-deal.

After two seasons, the club released Jackman due to an undisclosed reason. He then played for a year for Székesfehérvár, a Hungarian team playing in the Austrian Erste Bank Eishockey Liga.

On August 26, 2014, the Nippon Paper Cranes, a Japanese team playing in the Asia League Ice Hockey, announced that they had signed Jackman to a one-year contract.

On June 11, 2015, the Braehead Clan of the UK EIHL announced that they had signed the former Stanley Cup winner for the 2015-16 Season.

For the 2016-17 season, Jackman remained in the UK by signing for Braehead's Elite League rivals, the Fife Flyers. After a season in Fife, Jackman confirmed his intention to retire in April 2017.

== International play ==
Internationally, Jackman has represented Team Canada. He helped Canada capture a gold medal at the 1997 World Junior Championships. Jackman also won the 2007 Spengler Cup as a member of Team Canada. He also played in 2008 & 2009 for Team Canada in the Spengler Cup.

== Coaching career ==
In June 2017, Jackman was appointed head coach of the Bradford Rattlers of the Greater Metro Junior A Hockey League. The team amassed a record of 31–11–0; tying for first in the Northern Conference.

== Career statistics ==
=== Regular season and playoffs ===
			Regular season					Playoffs
Season	Team	League	GP	G	A	Pts	PIM	GP	G	A	Pts	PIM
1993–94	Mississauga Senators AAA	GTHL	81	35	53	88	156	—	—	—	—	—
1994–95	Mississauga Senators AAA	GTHL	53	20	37	57	120	—	—	—	—	—
1994–95	Richmond Hill Riot	MetJHL	10	2	9	11	16	—	—	—	—	—
1995–96	Sault Ste. Marie Greyhounds	OHL	66	13	29	42	97	4	1	0	1	15
1996–97	Sault Ste. Marie Greyhounds	OHL	53	13	34	47	116	10	2	6	8	24
1997–98	Sault Ste. Marie Greyhounds	OHL	60	33	40	73	111	—	—	—	—	—
1997–98	Michigan K-Wings	IHL	14	1	5	6	10	4	0	0	0	10
1998–99	Michigan K-Wings	IHL	71	13	17	30	106	5	0	4	4	6
1999–2000	Dallas Stars	NHL	22	1	2	3	6	—	—	—	—	—
1999–2000	Michigan K-Wings	IHL	50	3	16	19	51	—	—	—	—	—
2000–01	Dallas Stars	NHL	16	0	0	0	18	—	—	—	—	—
2000–01	Utah Grizzlies	IHL	57	9	19	28	24	—	—	—	—	—
2001–02	Providence Bruins	AHL	9	0	1	1	8	2	0	0	0	2
2001–02	Boston Bruins	NHL	2	0	0	0	2	—	—	—	—	—
2002–03	St. John's Maple Leafs	AHL	8	2	6	8	24	—	—	—	—	—
2002–03	Toronto Maple Leafs	NHL	42	0	2	2	41	—	—	—	—	—
2003–04	Toronto Maple Leafs	NHL	29	2	4	6	13	—	—	—	—	—
2003–04	St. John's Maple Leafs	AHL	3	2	1	3	0	—	—	—	—	—
2003–04	Pittsburgh Penguins	NHL	25	7	17	24	14	—	—	—	—	—
2004–05	IF Björklöven	Allsv	46	13	26	39	209	—	—	—	—	—
2005–06	Pittsburgh Penguins	NHL	49	6	22	28	46	—	—	—	—	—
2005–06	Florida Panthers	NHL	15	1	1	2	6	—	—	—	—	—
2006–07	Florida Panthers	NHL	7	1	0	1	10	—	—	—	—	—
2006–07	Anaheim Ducks	NHL	24	1	10	11	10	7	1	1	2	2
2007–08	EC Red Bull Salzburg	EBEL	31	7	23	30	34	—	—	—	—	—
2007–08	Leksands IF	Allsv	8	1	5	6	10	10	4	5	9	10
2008–09	Leksands IF	Allsv	29	8	12	20	91	—	—	—	—	—
2009–10	EHC Biel	NLA	47	6	14	20	113	—	—	—	—	—
2010–11	Utah Grizzlies	ECHL	16	4	10	14	4	—	—	—	—	—
2010–11	HC Slovan Bratislava	Slovak	23	3	10	13	42	7	1	2	3	4
2011–12	Anyang Halla	AL	36	9	28	37	36	5	1	4	5	6
2012–13	Anyang Halla	AL	41	16	38	54	28	3	1	0	1	6
2013–14	Alba Volán Székesfehérvár	EBEL	52	4	21	25	42	4	0	1	1	0
2014–15	Nippon Paper Cranes	AL	46	13	13	26	62	—	—	—	—	—
2015–16	Braehead Clan	EIHL	41	6	14	20	10	2	0	0	0	0
2016–17	Fife Flyers	EIHL	43	2	18	20	28	2	0	0	0	2
IHL totals			192	26	57	83	191	9	0	4	4	16
NHL totals			231	19	58	77	166	7	1	1	2	2
AL totals			123	38	79	117	126	8	2	4	6	12

=== International ===
Year	Team	Event	Result	GP	G	A	Pts	PIM
1997	Canada	WJC	1st place, gold medalist(s)	7	2	0	2	0
Junior totals				7	2	0	2	0

== Awards and honours ==
Award	Year
OHL
CHL All-Rookie Team	1996
NHL
Stanley Cup (Anaheim Ducks)	2007

Awards and achievements
Preceded by Jarome Iginla	Dallas Stars first-round draft pick 1996	Succeeded by Brenden Morrow
