= Per-Ragnar Bergkvist =

Swedish ice hockey player

- Born: 11 April 1976 (age 50) Falun, Sweden
- Height: 5 ft 11 in (180 cm)
- Weight: 187 lb (85 kg; 13 st 5 lb)
- Position: Goaltender
- Caught: Left
- Played for: Leksands IF; Vålerenga Ishockey; Färjestad BK
- NHL draft: 124th overall, 1996; Philadelphia Flyers
- Playing career: 1995–2016

Per-Ragnar Bergkvist (born 11 April 1976) is a Swedish former professional ice hockey player who played in the Swedish Hockey League (SHL). Bergkvist was drafted in the fifth round of the 1996 NHL entry draft by the Philadelphia Flyers, but he never played professionally in North America. He spent most of his professional career in Sweden, playing four seasons in the SHL with Leksands IF and Färjestad BK. In his first two SHL seasons he was the backup to fellow Flyers prospect Johan Hedberg.
