= 1997 World Junior Ice Hockey Championships =

1997 IIHF World U20 Championship

Tournament details
- Host country: Switzerland
- Venues: 2 (in 2 host cities)
- Dates: December 26, 1996 – January 4, 1997
- Teams: 10

Final positions
- Champions: Canada (10th title)
- Runners-up: United States
- Third place: Russia
- Fourth place: Czech Republic

Tournament statistics
- Games played: 31
- Goals scored: 204 (6.58 per game)
- Attendance: 31,336 (1,011 per game)
- Scoring leader: (United States) Mike York (10 points)

The 1997 World Junior Ice Hockey Championships were held in Geneva and Morges, Switzerland. The tournament was won by Canada, who won their record fifth-straight gold medal with a 2–0 victory over the United States in the gold-medal match. Mike York of the United States was the top scorer in the tournament, with five goals and five assists for ten points.

The tournament all-star team selected upon the conclusion of the tournament included forwards Mike York (United States), Sergei Samsonov (Russia) and Christian Dube (Canada); defencemen Mark Streit (Switzerland) and Chris Phillips (Canada); and goaltender Brian Boucher (United States).

Notable future National Hockey League (NHL) stars that played in this year's tournament included Joe Thornton (Canada), Daniel Brière (Canada) and Marián Hossa (Slovakia).

== Pool A ==
=== Round robin ===
==== Group A ====
| Team | Pld | W | L | D | GF | GA | GD | Pts |
|---|---|---|---|---|---|---|---|---|
| United States | 4 | 3 | 0 | 1 | 18 | 5 | +13 | 7 |
| Canada | 4 | 2 | 0 | 2 | 15 | 9 | +6 | 6 |
| Czech Republic | 4 | 1 | 1 | 2 | 13 | 8 | +5 | 4 |
| Switzerland | 4 | 1 | 2 | 1 | 8 | 11 | −3 | 3 |
| Germany | 4 | 0 | 4 | 0 | 5 | 26 | −21 | 0 |

Source: Hockey Canada

| December 26, 1996 | United States | 4 – 0 | Switzerland | Patinoire des Vernets, Geneva |

| December 26, 1996 | Czech Republic | 8 – 2 | Germany | Morges |

| December 27, 1996 | Canada | 4 – 1 (1-1, 1-0, 2-0) | Germany | Patinoire des Vernets, Geneva; Attendance: 850 |

Marc Denis
Goalies
Kai Fischer
Referee:
(Sweden) Peter Andersson
Linesmen:
(United States) Hans Baker
(Sweden) Stefan Danielsson

| | 0-1 | 3:18 - Fendt (Kreutzer) (PP) |
| Isbister (Whitfield) (PP) - 17:23 | 1-1 |
| Mann - 32:21 | 2-1 |
| Jackman (Dubé) - 43:50 | 3-1 |
| Thornton (Briere, Mann) (PP) - 51:26 | 4-1 |

34
Shots
22

| December 27, 1996 | Czech Republic | 1 – 1 | Switzerland | Morges |

| December 28, 1996 | Canada | 4 – 4 (2-2, 1-0, 1-2) | United States | Patinoire des Vernets, Geneva; Attendance: 2,769 |

Marc Denis
Goalies
Brian Boucher
Referee:
(Finland) Pekka Haajanen
Linesmen:
(Sweden) Stefan Danielsson
(Czech Republic) Pavel Halas

| Dubé (Doig) 1:18 | 1-0 |
| | 1-1 | 1:48 - Parrish (Young) |
| | 1-2 | 4:43 - Farkas (Smith) |
| Dubé (PP) - 8:52 | 2-2 |
| Brière (Isbister) - 26:24 | 3-2 |
| | 3-3 | 40:28 - LaCouture (Boulerice) |
| | 3-4 | 55:46 - Young (Poti) |
| Schaefer (Mann) - 56:54 | 4-4 |

32
Shots
26

| December 29, 1996 | Switzerland | 6 – 2 | Germany | Patinoire des Vernets, Geneva |

| December 29, 1996 | United States | 2 – 1 | Czech Republic | Patinoire des Vernets, Geneva |

| December 30, 1996 | Canada | 4 – 1 (0-1, 2-0, 2-0) | Switzerland | Patinoire des Vernets, Geneva; Attendance: 3,353 |

Marc Denis
Goalies
David Aebischer
Referee:
(Czech Republic) Frantisek Rejhar
Linesmen:
(Sweden) Stefan Danielsson
(Slovakia) Milan Misek

| | 0-1 | 16:35 - Riesen |
| Isbister (Brière) 21:32 | 1-1 |
| Dubé (Isbister) (PP) - 31:32 | 2-1 |
| Thornton (McCauley, Briere) - 43:34 | 3-1 |
| Mann (Doig) - 55:30 | 4-1 |

35
Shots
21

| December 31, 1996 | Canada | 3 – 3 (1-1, 1-1, 1-1) | Czech Republic | Patinoire des Vernets, Geneva; Attendance: 515 |

Marc Denis
Goalies
Adam Svoboda
Referee:
(Sweden) Peter Andersson
Linesmen:
(Poland) Grzegorz Dzięciołowski
(Czech Republic) Pavel Helas

| Letowski (Thornton) - 9:42 | 1-0 |
| | 1-1 | 10:17 - Matejovsky (Zidlicky) |
| | 1-2 | 26:33 - Melenovský |
| Jackman (Mann) (PP) - 28:22 | 2-2 |
| Mann (Dubé) - 55:38 | 3-2 |
| | 3-3 | 59:50 - Burger (Kratena) (SH) |

29
Shots
22

| December 31, 1996 | United States | 8 – 0 | Germany | Patinoire des Vernets, Geneva |

==== Group B ====
| Team | Pld | W | L | D | GF | GA | GD | Pts |
|---|---|---|---|---|---|---|---|---|
| Russia | 4 | 3 | 0 | 1 | 20 | 5 | +15 | 7 |
| Finland | 4 | 3 | 1 | 0 | 17 | 9 | +8 | 6 |
| Slovakia | 4 | 2 | 2 | 0 | 17 | 13 | +4 | 4 |
| Sweden | 4 | 1 | 2 | 1 | 10 | 10 | 0 | 3 |
| Poland | 4 | 0 | 4 | 0 | 6 | 33 | −27 | 0 |

Source: Hockey Canada

| December 26, 1996 | Russia | 4 – 3 | Slovakia | Patinoire des Vernets, Geneva |

| December 26, 1996 | Finland | 7 – 0 | Poland | Morges |

| December 27, 1996 | Slovakia | 4 – 1 | Sweden | Patinoire des Vernets, Geneva |

| December 27, 1996 | Russia | 12 – 0 | Poland | Morges |

| December 28, 1996 | Finland | 4 – 2 | Sweden | Morges |

| December 29, 1996 | Slovakia | 7 – 4 | Poland | Morges |

| December 29, 1996 | Russia | 4 – 2 | Finland | Morges |

| December 30, 1996 | Sweden | 7 – 2 | Poland | Morges |

| December 31, 1996 | Finland | 4 – 3 | Slovakia | Morges |

| December 31, 1996 | Russia | 0 – 0 | Sweden | Morges |

=== Relegation round ===
| Team | Pld | W | L | D | GF | GA | GD | Pts |
|---|---|---|---|---|---|---|---|---|
| Switzerland | 3 | 3 | 0 | 0 | 18 | 5 | +13 | 6 |
| Sweden | 3 | 2 | 1 | 0 | 17 | 10 | +7 | 4 |
| Germany | 3 | 1 | 2 | 0 | 11 | 14 | −3 | 2 |
| Poland | 3 | 0 | 3 | 0 | 3 | 20 | −17 | 0 |

Source: Hockey Canada

| December 29, 1996 | Switzerland | 6 – 2 | Germany | Patinoire des Vernets, Geneva |

| December 30, 1996 | Sweden | 7 – 2 | Poland | Morges |

| January 2, 1997 | Switzerland | 6 – 1 | Poland | Morges |

| January 2, 1997 | Sweden | 8 – 2 | Germany | Morges |

| January 3, 1997 | Switzerland | 6 – 2 | Sweden | Morges |

| January 3, 1997 | Germany | 7 – 0 | Poland | Morges |

Poland was relegated for the 1998 World Junior Championships.

=== Medal rounds ===
Quarter finals
A2 | Canada | 7
B3 | Slovakia | 2
B2 | Finland | 2
A3 | Czech Republic | 3

Semi finals
QF1 | Canada | 3
B1 | Russia | 2
QF2 | Czech Republic | 2
A1 | United States | 5

Final
SF1 | Canada | 2
SF2 | United States | 0
Third place
QF1 | Russia | 4
QF2 | Czech Republic | 1

==== Quarterfinals ====
| January 1, 1997 | Canada | 7 – 2 (0-0, 3-1, 4-1) | Slovakia | Patinoire des Vernets, Geneva; Attendance: 1,101 |

Marc Denis
Goalies
Stanislav Petrik
Referee:
(United States) Alex Dell
Linesmen:
(Germany) Oswald Christian
(Czech Republic) Pavel Halas

| Briere (Isbister) - 25:07 | 1-0 |
| Whitfield (Thornton, Mann) (PP) - 27:35 | 2-0 |
| | 2-1 | 32:25 - Hossa (Vaic, Pavlikovský) (PP) |
| Schaefer (Dubé, McCauley) (PP) - 38:49 | 3-1 |
| | 3-2 | 41:15 - Rieciciar (Handzus, Somik) |
| Isbister - 44:51 | 4-2 |
| Devereaux (McCauley) - 49:42 | 5-2 |
| Letowski - 51:50 | 6-2 |
| Dubé (Schaefer) (PP) - 56:28 | 7-2 |

31
Shots
39

| January 1, 1997 | Czech Republic | 3 – 2 GWS (0–1, 1–0, 1–1, 0-0, 3-1) | Finland | Patinoire des Vernets, Geneva |

==== Semifinals ====
| January 3, 1997 | Canada | 3 – 2 (1-1, 0-1, 2-0) | Russia | Patinoire des Vernets, Geneva; Attendance: 1,976 |

Marc Denis
Goalies
Radmir Faizov
Referee:
(Sweden) Henrik Andersson
Linesmen:
(Sweden) Stefan Danielsson
(Czech Republic) Pavel Halas

| | 0-1 | 11:53 - Morozov (Sidulov) (PP) |
| Schaefer (McCauley) (PP) - 18:10 | 1-1 |
| | 1-2 | 29:56 - Gabdulin (Volchkov) |
| Devereaux (McCauley) - 40:49 | 2-2 |
| Devereaux (Larsen, Phillips) - 49:44 | 3-2 |

27
Shots
28

| January 3, 1997 | United States | 5 – 2 (2–2, 1–0, 2–0) | Czech Republic | Patinoire des Vernets, Geneva |

==== 5th-place game ====
| January 3, 1997 | Finland | 6 – 4 (4–1, 0–1, 2–2) | Slovakia | Morges |

==== Bronze-medal game ====
| 4 January 1997 | (bronze) Russia | 4 – 1 (2-0, 1-1, 1-0) | Czech Republic | Patinoire des Vernets, Geneva; Attendance: 855 |

Game reference
Alexei Morozov 6:23 (SH); Alexei Kolkunin 15:10 (PP); Oleg Kvasha 22:33; Sergei Samsonov 49:04 / Goals / Marek Melenovsky 36:47

==== Gold-medal game ====
| 4 January 1997 | (gold) Canada | 2 – 0 (0-0, 1-0, 1-0) | United States (silver) | Patinoire des Vernets, Geneva; Attendance: 4,269 |

Game reference
| | | | Referee: (Czech Republic) Frantisek Rejhar; Linesmen: (Sweden) Stefan Danielsson (Czech Republic) Pavel Halas |
| Devereaux (Letowski) - 28:38 / 1-0; Isbister (Briere) - 43:09 / 2-0 | | | Referee: (Czech Republic) Frantisek Rejhar; Linesmen: (Sweden) Stefan Danielsson (Czech Republic) Pavel Halas |
| 23 | Shots | 35 | Referee: (Czech Republic) Frantisek Rejhar; Linesmen: (Sweden) Stefan Danielsson (Czech Republic) Pavel Halas |

=== Final standings ===
| | Team |
|---|---|
| 1st place, gold medalist(s) | Canada |
| 2nd place, silver medalist(s) | United States |
| 3rd place, bronze medalist(s) | Russia |
| 4th | Czech Republic |
| 5th | Finland |
| 6th | Slovakia |
| 7th | Switzerland |
| 8th | Sweden |
| 9th | Germany |
| 10th | Poland |

Poland was relegated for the 1998 World Juniors

=== Scoring leaders ===
| Player | Country | GP | G | A | Pts |
|---|---|---|---|---|---|
| Mike York | United States | 6 | 5 | 5 | 10 |
| Tomi Kallio | Finland | 6 | 5 | 4 | 9 |
| Erik Rasmussen | United States | 6 | 4 | 5 | 9 |
| Rastislav Pavlikovský | Slovakia | 7 | 2 | 7 | 9 |
| Alexei Morozov | Russia | 6 | 5 | 3 | 8 |
| Niko Kapanen | Finland | 6 | 4 | 4 | 8 |
| Alexei Kolkounov | Russia | 6 | 4 | 4 | 8 |
| Ľubomír Vaic | Slovakia | 6 | 1 | 7 | 8 |
| Sergei Samsonov | Russia | 6 | 6 | 1 | 7 |
| Marián Hossa | Slovakia | 6 | 5 | 2 | 7 |
| Mark Parrish | United States | 6 | 5 | 2 | 7 |
| Brad Isbister | Canada | 6 | 4 | 3 | 7 |
| Christian Dubé | Canada | 6 | 4 | 3 | 7 |
| Cameron Mann | Canada | 6 | 4 | 3 | 7 |
| Marek Melenovský | Czech Republic | 6 | 4 | 3 | 7 |
| Boris Lingemann | Germany | 6 | 4 | 3 | 7 |
| Ondrej Kratena | Czech Republic | 6 | 3 | 4 | 7 |
| Ville Nieminen | Finland | 6 | 2 | 5 | 7 |

=== Goaltending leaders ===
(minimum 40% team's total ice time)

| Player | Country | MINS | GAA |
|---|---|---|---|
| Denis Khlopotnov | Russia | 180 | 0.33 |
| Brian Boucher | United States | 357.13 | 1.51 |
| Marc Denis | Canada | 419.52 | 1.86 |
| David Aebischer | Switzerland | 300 | 2.00 |
| Adam Svoboda | Czech Republic | 428.27 | 2.66 |

=== Tournament awards ===
| | IIHF Directorate Awards | Media All-Star Team |
|---|---|---|
| Goaltender | (Canada) Marc Denis | (United States) Brian Boucher |
| Defencemen | (United States) Joe Corvo | (Canada) Chris Phillips (Switzerland) Mark Streit |
| Forwards | (Russia) Alexei Morozov | (Canada) Christian Dubé (Russia) Sergei Samsonov (United States) Michael York |

== Pool B ==
This tournament was played in Kyiv Ukraine, from December 27 to January 5.

Standings

| Pos | Team | Pld | W | L | D | GF | GA | GD | Pts | Kazakhstan men's national junior ice hockey team | Latvia men's national junior ice hockey team | France men's national junior ice hockey team | Norway men's national junior ice hockey team | Ukraine men's national junior ice hockey team | Japan men's national junior ice hockey team | Hungary men's national junior ice hockey team | Italy men's national junior ice hockey team |
|---|---|---|---|---|---|---|---|---|---|---|---|---|---|---|---|---|---|
| 1 | Kazakhstan | 7 | 6 | 0 | 1 | 39 | 15 | +24 | 13 | | 4–1 | 1–1 | 7–5 | 3–1 | 4–0 | 11–3 | 9–4 |
| 2 | Latvia | 7 | 5 | 1 | 1 | 28 | 19 | +9 | 11 | 1–4 | | 4–3 | 5–5 | 2–1 | 4–3 | 9–1 | 3–2 |
| 3 | France | 7 | 4 | 1 | 2 | 22 | 16 | +6 | 10 | 1–1 | 3–4 | | 5–4 | 4–3 | 1–1 | 3–2 | 5–1 |
| 4 | Norway | 7 | 2 | 2 | 3 | 33 | 23 | +10 | 7 | 5–7 | 5–5 | 4–5 | | 2–2 | 3–3 | 5–1 | 9–0 |
| 5 | Ukraine | 7 | 3 | 3 | 1 | 26 | 18 | +8 | 7 | 1–3 | 1–2 | 3–4 | 2–2 | | 4–3 | 8–1 | 7–3 |
| 6 | Japan | 7 | 2 | 3 | 2 | 24 | 17 | +7 | 6 | 0–4 | 3–4 | 1–1 | 3–3 | 3–4 | | 6–1 | 8–0 |
| 7 | Hungary | 7 | 1 | 6 | 0 | 14 | 44 | −30 | 2 | 3–11 | 1–9 | 2–3 | 1–5 | 1–8 | 1–6 | | 5–2 |
| 8 | Italy | 7 | 0 | 7 | 0 | 12 | 46 | −34 | 0 | 4–9 | 2–3 | 1–5 | 0–9 | 3–7 | 0–8 | 2–5 | |

Legend: Blue = home team win; Red = away team win; Yellow = draw.

Kazakhstan was promoted to Pool A, and Italy was relegated to Pool C, for 1998.

== Pool C ==
Played in Gheorgheni and Miercurea Ciuc, Romania from December 30 to January 3.

=== Preliminary round ===
Group A

| Team | Pld | W | L | D | GF | GA | GD | Pts | Belarus men's national junior ice hockey team | Great Britain men's national junior ice hockey team | Austria men's national junior ice hockey team | Croatia men's national junior ice hockey team |
|---|---|---|---|---|---|---|---|---|---|---|---|---|
| Belarus | 3 | 3 | 0 | 0 | 26 | 2 | +24 | 6 | | 7–2 | 8–0 | 11–0 |
| Great Britain | 3 | 2 | 1 | 0 | 13 | 9 | +4 | 4 | 2–7 | | 4–2 | 7–0 |
| Austria | 3 | 1 | 2 | 0 | 6 | 12 | −6 | 2 | 0–8 | 2–4 | | 4–0 |
| Croatia | 3 | 0 | 3 | 0 | 0 | 22 | −22 | 0 | 0–11 | 0–7 | 0–4 | |

Legend: Blue = home team win; Red = away team win; Yellow = draw.

Group B

| Team | Pld | W | L | D | GF | GA | GD | Pts | Slovenia men's national junior ice hockey team | Denmark men's national junior ice hockey team | Romania men's national junior ice hockey team | Netherlands men's national junior ice hockey team |
|---|---|---|---|---|---|---|---|---|---|---|---|---|
| Slovenia | 3 | 3 | 0 | 0 | 22 | 6 | +16 | 6 | | 6–2 | 6–2 | 10–2 |
| Denmark | 3 | 2 | 1 | 0 | 27 | 8 | +19 | 4 | 2–6 | | 9–0 | 16–2 |
| Romania | 3 | 1 | 2 | 0 | 8 | 18 | −10 | 2 | 2–6 | 0–9 | | 6–3 |
| Netherlands | 3 | 0 | 3 | 0 | 7 | 32 | −25 | 0 | 2–10 | 2–16 | 3–6 | |

Legend: Blue = home team win; Red = away team win; Yellow = draw.

=== Placement Games ===
- 7th place:Croatia 5 - 3 Netherlands
- 5th place:Austria 3 - 1 Romania
- 3rd place:Denmark 5 - 4 Great Britain
- 1st Place:Belarus 8 - 2 Slovenia

Belarus was promoted to Pool B, and Netherlands was relegated to Pool D for 1998.

== Pool D ==
Played in Sofia Bulgaria from December 30 to January 3.

=== Preliminary round ===
Group A

| Team | Pld | W | L | D | GF | GA | GD | Pts | Lithuania men's national junior ice hockey team | Spain men's national junior ice hockey team | Bulgaria men's national junior ice hockey team | Mexico men's national junior ice hockey team |
|---|---|---|---|---|---|---|---|---|---|---|---|---|
| Lithuania | 3 | 3 | 0 | 0 | 45 | 4 | +41 | 6 | | 10–1 | 15–1 | 20–2 |
| Spain | 3 | 2 | 1 | 0 | 17 | 12 | +5 | 4 | 1–10 | | 3–1 | 13–1 |
| Bulgaria | 3 | 1 | 2 | 0 | 9 | 20 | −11 | 2 | 1–15 | 1–3 | | 7–2 |
| Mexico | 3 | 0 | 3 | 0 | 5 | 40 | −35 | 0 | 2–20 | 1–13 | 2–7 | |

Legend: Blue = home team win; Red = away team win; Yellow = draw.

Group B

| Team | Pld | W | L | D | GF | GA | GD | Pts | Estonia men's national junior ice hockey team | Serbia and Montenegro men's national junior ice hockey team | Israel men's national junior ice hockey team | South Africa men's national junior ice hockey team |
|---|---|---|---|---|---|---|---|---|---|---|---|---|
| Estonia | 3 | 3 | 0 | 0 | 38 | 7 | +31 | 6 | | 8–3 | 12–3 | 18–1 |
| FR Yugoslavia | 3 | 2 | 1 | 0 | 22 | 12 | +10 | 4 | 3–8 | | 9–4 | 10–0 |
| Israel | 3 | 1 | 2 | 0 | 13 | 23 | −10 | 2 | 3–12 | 4–9 | | 6–2 |
| South Africa | 3 | 0 | 3 | 0 | 3 | 34 | −31 | 0 | 1–18 | 0–10 | 2–6 | |

Legend: Blue = home team win; Red = away team win; Yellow = draw.

=== Placement Games ===
- 7th place:South Africa 5 - 3 Mexico
- 5th place:Israel 7 - 3 Bulgaria
- 3rd place:FR Yugoslavia 4 - 1 Spain
- 1st Place:Estonia 8 - 4 Lithuania

Estonia was promoted to Pool C for 1998.
