= Ruslan Shafikov =

Russian ice hockey player

- Born: May 11, 1976 (age 50) Ufa, Russia, U.S.S.R.
- Height: 6 ft 1 in (185 cm)
- Weight: 198 lb (90 kg; 14 st 2 lb)
- Position: Center
- Shot: Right
- Played for: Salavat Yulaev Ufa; SKA Saint Petersburg
- NHL draft: 204th overall, 1995; Philadelphia Flyers
- Playing career: 1994–2006

Ruslan Shafikov (born May 11, 1976) is a Russian former professional ice hockey player who played in the Russian Superleague (RSL). Shafikov was drafted in the eighth round of the 1995 NHL entry draft by the Philadelphia Flyers, but he never played professionally in North America. He played seven seasons in the RSL for Salavat Yulaev Ufa and SKA Saint Petersburg.

== Career statistics ==
			Regular season					Playoffs
Season	Team	League	GP	G	A	Pts	PIM	GP	G	A	Pts	PIM
1992–93	Novoil Ufa	RUS.2	20	7	1	8	0	—	—	—	—	—
1993–94	Novoil Ufa	RUS.3	10	2	0	2	4	—	—	—	—	—
1994–95	Salavat Yulaev Ufa	IHL	30	2	0	2	10	7	1	1	2	4
1994–95	Novoil Ufa	RUS.2	22	9	7	16	10	—	—	—	—	—
1995–96	Salavat Yulaev Ufa	IHL	51	9	2	11	18	3	0	0	0	4
1996–97	Salavat Yulaev Ufa	RSL	31	11	7	18	22	10	3	2	5	12
1996–97	Novoil Ufa	RUS.3	3	5	2	7	2	—	—	—	—	—
1997–98	Salavat Yulaev Ufa	RSL	40	12	4	16	14	—	—	—	—	—
1997–98	Novoil Ufa	RUS.3	5	6	4	10	8	—	—	—	—	—
1998–99	Salavat Yulaev Ufa	RSL	41	3	11	14	26	4	0	1	1	2
1999–2000	SKA St. Petersburg	RSL	35	5	7	12	6	3	0	0	0	2
2000–01	SKA St. Petersburg	RSL	6	0	1	1	0	—	—	—	—	—
2001–02	Neftyanik Leninogorsk	RUS.2	33	10	7	17	10	—	—	—	—	—
2002–03	Neftyanik Leninogorsk	RUS.2	35	8	14	22	18	—	—	—	—	—
2003–04	Neftyanik Leninogorsk	RUS.2	30	7	7	14	28	—	—	—	—	—
2003–04	Dizel Penza	RUS.2	25	6	12	18	14	4	1	1	2	24
2004–05	Dizel Penza	RUS.2	37	7	10	17	64	—	—	—	—	—
2004–05	Dizel–2 Penza	RUS.3	1	0	0	0	0	—	—	—	—	—
2005–06	Olimpiya Kirovo–Chepetsk	RUS.2	22	1	0	1	8	—	—	—	—	—
2005–06	Stal Asha	RUS.4	6	0	1	1	4	—	—	—	—	—
2006–07	Stal Asha	RUS.4	33	5	24	29	10	—	—	—	—	—
2007–08	Stal Asha	RUS.4	—	—	—	—	—	—	0	3	3	—
RUS.2 totals			224	55	58	113	152	4	1	1	2	24
IHL & RSL totals			234	42	32	74	96	27	4	4	8	24
