= Kimmo Lotvonen =

Finnish ice hockey player

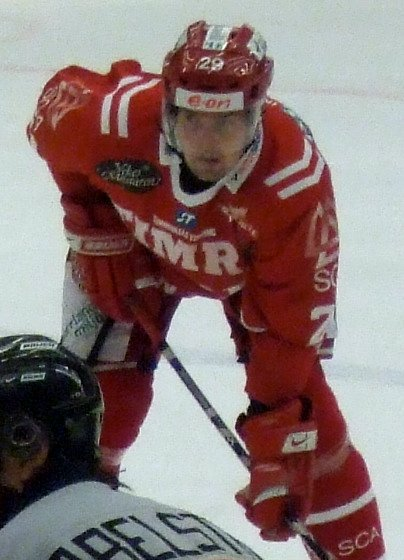
- Born: January 11, 1976 (age 49); Oulu, FIN
- Height: 6 ft 4.5 in (194 cm)
- Weight: 229 lb (104 kg; 16 st 5 lb)
- Position: Defence
- Shoots: Left
- Swe-2 team Former teams: Leksands IF; Lukko (SM-l); Kärpät (SM-l); Timrå IK (SEL)
- Playing career: 1995–present

Kimmo Lotvonen (born January 11, 1976, in Oulu, Finland) is a defenceman for the Leksands IF hockey team in the Swedish HockeyAllsvenskan league.

== Career statistics ==
			Regular season					Playoffs
Season	Team	League	GP	G	A	Pts	PIM	GP	G	A	Pts	PIM
1995–96	Lukko	SM-l	38	3	6	9	44	--	--	--	--	--
1996–97	Lukko	SM-l	29	1	6	7	14	--	--	--	--	--
1997–98	Lukko	SM-l	46	5	9	14	63	--	--	--	--	--
1998-99	Lukko	SM-l	42	2	7	9	46	--	--	--	--	--
1999-00	Lukko	SM-l	40	3	8	11	14	4	0	2	2	11
2000-01	Lukko	SM-l	49	4	9	13	28	3	0	1	1	2
2001-02	Kärpät	SM-l	54	1	8	9	68	4	0	1	1	6
2002-03	Kärpät	SM-l	48	1	7	8	42	13	0	2	2	4
2003-04	Kärpät	SM-l	21	2	8	10	12	15	0	2	2	12
2004-05	Kärpät	SM-l	54	0	12	12	28	12	0	0	0	0
2005-06	Leksands IF	SEL	12	3	1	4	20	—	—	—	—	—
2006-07	Timrå IK	SEL	30	2	6	8	26	—	—	—	—	—
2007-08	Timrå IK	SEL	47	4	8	12	42	11	0	1	1	14
2008-09	Timrå IK	SEL	46	3	12	15	44	1	0	0	0	0
