= Kimmo Wilska =

Finnish newscaster

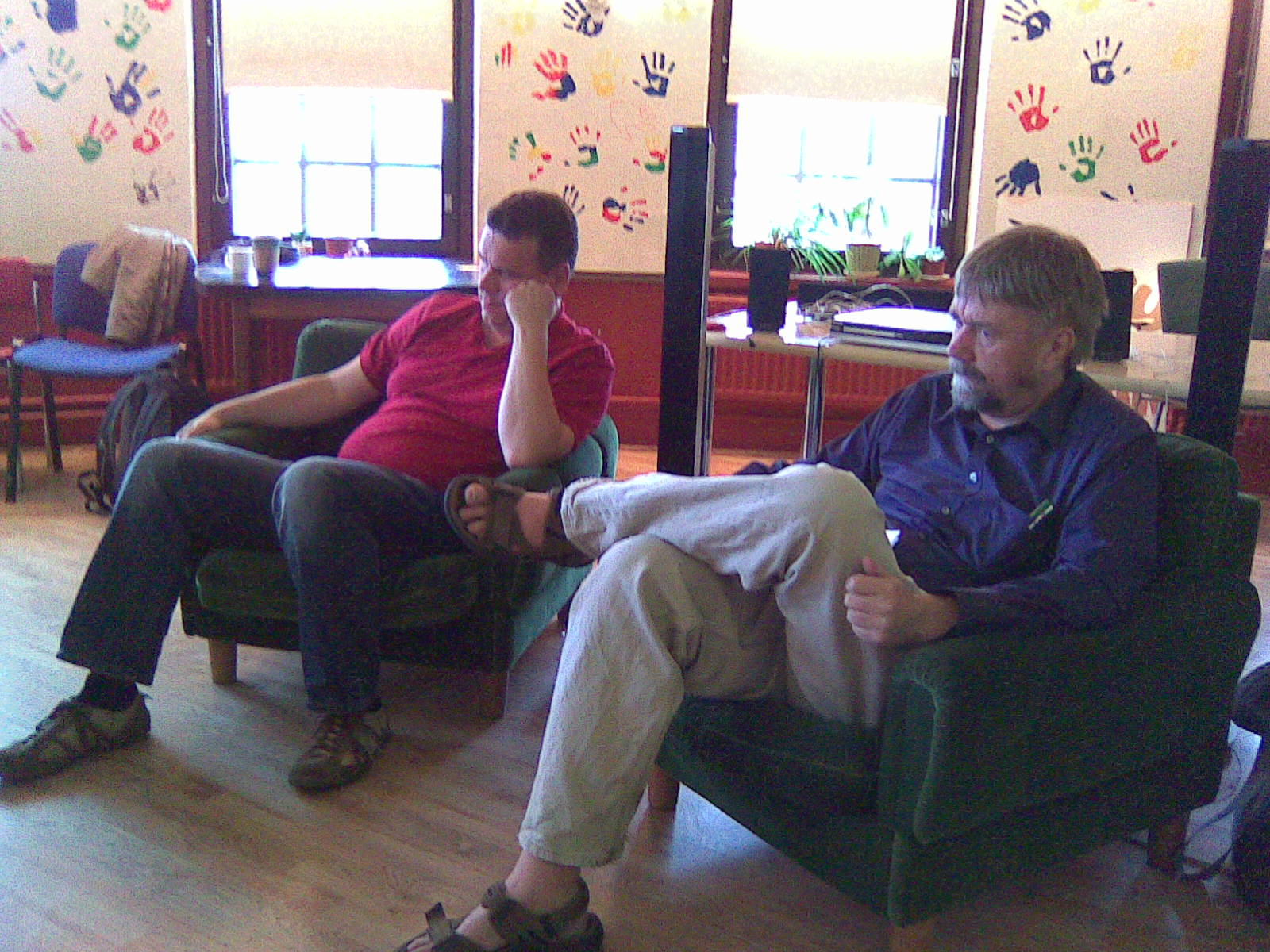
Kimmo Wilska (right) interviewing writer Jussi Förbom.

Kimmo Wilska (born 5 August 1956 in Helsinki) is an English-speaking Finnish newscaster. He worked at YLE from 1985 until 2010 in YLE's morning broadcast, and read the English-language news on YLE News.

On 13 October 2010, Wilska was fired after pretending to be caught drinking beer on camera following an alcohol-related news story. The stunt was too much for YLE, and Wilska was immediately fired. Wilska is known to have previously finished the 2009 Christmas newscast wearing a Santa Claus hat. Wilska received much support from viewers after the incident, and the clip of the gag became an Internet meme amongst Finnish YouTube users.

Wilska has also been politically active as one of the early members of the Green League and as a member of the Finnish Cannabis Association.
