= 2003 World Junior Ice Hockey Championships =

2003 IIHF World U20 Championship

Tournament details
- Host country: Canada
- Venue(s): Halifax Metro Centre and Centre 200 (in 2 host cities)
- Dates: December 26, 2002 – January 5, 2003
- Teams: 10

Final positions
- Champions: Russia (3rd title)
- Runners-up: Canada
- Third place: Finland
- Fourth place: United States

Tournament statistics
- Games played: 31
- Goals scored: 187 (6.03 per game)
- Attendance: 242,173 (7,812 per game)
- Scoring leader(s): (Switzerland) Patrik Bärtschi (Russia) Igor Grigorenko (10 points)

The 2003 IIHF World U20 Championship, commonly referred as the 2003 World Junior Hockey Championships (2003 WJHC), was the 27th edition of the Ice Hockey World Junior Championship. The tournament was held in Halifax and Sydney, Nova Scotia, Canada, from December 26, 2002, to January 5, 2003. Russia won the gold medal for the second consecutive year with a 3–2 victory over Canada in the championship game, while Finland won the bronze medal with a 3–2 victory over the United States.

Playoff round (again) reverted to six teams qualifying, with group leaders getting a bye into the semifinals.

== Venues ==
Halifax Metro Centre Capacity: 10,595	Centre 200 Capacity: 4,881
Canada – Halifax	Canada – Sydney

== Top Division ==
=== Preliminary round ===
==== Group A ====
Pos	Team	Pld	W	D	L	GF	GA	GD	Pts	Qualification
1	Russia	4	4	0	0	21	7	+14	8	Semifinals
2	United States	4	3	0	1	15	9	+6	6	Quarterfinals
3	Slovakia	4	2	0	2	15	8	+7	4	Quarterfinals
4	Switzerland	4	1	0	3	10	15	−5	2	Relegation round
5	Belarus	4	0	0	4	6	28	−22	0	Relegation round

Source: IIHF.com at the Wayback Machine

All times local (AST/UTC-4).

December 26, 2002; 14:00	Belarus	2–4 (1–2, 1–0, 0–2)	Switzerland	Centre 200, Sydney; Attendance: 1,951

December 26, 2002; 18:00	United States	1–5 (0–2, 1–2, 0–1)	Russia	Centre 200, Sydney; Attendance: 4,950

December 27, 2002; 20:00	Slovakia	11–1 (3–1, 4–0, 4–0)	Belarus	Centre 200, Sydney; Attendance: 2,548

December 28, 2002; 16:00	Switzerland	1–3 (1–0, 0–2, 0–1)	United States	Centre 200, Sydney; Attendance: 2,331

December 28, 2002; 20:00	Russia	4–0 (1–0, 1–0, 2–0)	Slovakia	Centre 200, Sydney; Attendance: 3,213

December 29, 2002; 18:00	Belarus	1–5 (0–2, 1–2, 0–1)	Russia	Centre 200, Sydney; Attendance: 2,232

December 30, 2002; 14:00	United States	8–2 (4–0, 3–1, 1–1)	Belarus	Centre 200, Sydney; Attendance: 2,213

December 30, 2002; 18:00	Switzerland	0–3 (0–1, 0–2, 0–0)	Slovakia	Centre 200, Sydney; Attendance: 2,069

December 31, 2002; 14:00	Slovakia	1–3 (1–0, 0–2, 0–1)	United States	Centre 200, Sydney; Attendance: 2,238

December 31, 2002; 18:00	Russia	7–5 (2–1, 3–2, 2–2)	Switzerland	Centre 200, Sydney; Attendance: 2,249

==== Group B ====
Pos	Team	Pld	W	D	L	GF	GA	GD	Pts	Qualification
1	Canada	4	4	0	0	21	6	+15	8	Semifinals
2	Finland	4	2	1	1	12	9	+3	5	Quarterfinals
3	Czech Republic	4	2	1	1	8	7	+1	5	Quarterfinals
4	Sweden	4	1	0	3	12	16	−4	2	Relegation round
5	Germany	4	0	0	4	3	18	−15	0	Relegation round

Source: IIHF.com at the Wayback Machine

All times local (AST/UTC-4).

December 26, 2002; 16:00	Germany	0–4 (0–2, 0–0, 0–2)	Finland	Halifax Metro Centre, Halifax; Attendance: 8,923

December 26, 2002; 20:10	Sweden	2–8 (0–2, 2–2, 0–4)	Canada	Halifax Metro Centre, Halifax; Attendance: 10,594

December 27, 2002; 19:00	Czech Republic	3–0 (0–0, 2–0, 1–0)	Germany	Halifax Metro Centre, Halifax; Attendance: 9,562

December 28, 2002; 15:10	Canada	4–0 (1–0, 2–0, 1–0)	Czech Republic	Halifax Metro Centre, Halifax; Attendance: 10,594

December 28, 2002; 20:00	Finland	3–2 (1–0, 1–2, 1–0)	Sweden	Halifax Metro Centre, Halifax; Attendance: 10,089

December 29, 2002; 16:10	Germany	1–4 (1–0, 0–3, 0–1)	Canada	Halifax Metro Centre, Halifax; Attendance: 10,594

December 30, 2002; 16:00	Sweden	7–2 (3–0, 3–1, 1–1)	Germany	Halifax Metro Centre, Halifax; Attendance: 10,427

December 30, 2002; 20:00	Finland	2–2 (0–0, 1–1, 1–1)	Czech Republic	Halifax Metro Centre, Halifax; Attendance: 10,462

December 31, 2002; 16:00	Czech Republic	3–1 (0–0, 1–1, 2–0)	Sweden	Halifax Metro Centre, Halifax; Attendance: 10,416

December 31, 2002; 20:10	Canada	5–3 (1–1, 3–2, 1–0)	Finland	Halifax Metro Centre, Halifax; Attendance: 10,594

=== Relegation round ===
Results from games played during the preliminary round were carried forward to the relegation round.

Pos	Team	Pld	W	D	L	GF	GA	GD	Pts	Relegation
1	Switzerland	3	3	0	0	15	7	+8	6	
2	Sweden	3	2	0	1	15	11	+4	4	
3	Germany	3	1	0	2	8	13	−5	2	Relegated to the 2004 Division I
4	Belarus	3	0	0	3	6	13	−7	0	Relegated to the 2004 Division I

Source: IIHF.com at the Wayback Machine

All times local (AST/UTC-4).

January 2, 2003; 12:00	Switzerland	6–2 (2–0, 3–2, 1–0)	Germany	Halifax Metro Centre, Halifax; Attendance: 10,111

Tobias Stephan	Goalies	Dimitri Pätzold
34	Shots	18

January 3, 2003; 12:00	Sweden	5–4 (3–1, 0–2, 2–1)	Belarus	Halifax Metro Centre, Halifax; Attendance: 10,083

January 4, 2003; 16:00	Sweden	3–5 (1–2, 1–2, 1–1)	Switzerland	Halifax Metro Centre, Halifax; Attendance: 10,210

January 4, 2003; 20:00	Germany	4–0 (0–0, 2–0, 2–0)	Belarus	Halifax Metro Centre, Halifax; Attendance: 10,208

=== Playoff round ===
Quarterfinals
A2	United States	4
B3	Czech Republic	3
B2	Finland	6
A3	Slovakia	0

Semifinals
B1	Canada	3
A2	United States	2
A1	Russia	4
B2	Finland	1

Gold medal game
B1	Canada	2
A1	Russia	3
Bronze medal game
A2	United States	2
B2	Finland	3

==== Quarterfinals ====
January 2, 2003; 16:00	United States	4–3 (2–0, 2–2, 0–1)	Czech Republic	Halifax Metro Centre, Halifax; Attendance: 10,250

Bobby Goepfert
Goalies
Martin Falter, Lukáš Mensator

Helminen (Jones, Kesler) - 9:09	1-0
Parise (Brown) - 9:42	2-0
	2-1	Michálek (Klepiš, Hudler) - 24:02
Kesler (Higgins, Whitney) - 26:00	3-1
Suter (Higgins, Kesler) - 26:44	4-1
	4-2	Krajíček (Klepiš, Michálek) - 28:24
	4-3	Hudler (Klepiš) - 53:37

18
Shots
25

January 2, 2003; 20:10	Finland	6–0 (3–0, 3–0, 0–0)	Slovakia	Halifax Metro Centre, Halifax; Attendance: 10,162

Kari Lehtonen	Goalies	Ján Chovan, Peter Ševela
25	Shots	15

==== Semifinals ====
January 3, 2003; 16:10	Russia	4–1 (1–1, 0–0, 3–0)	Finland	Halifax Metro Centre, Halifax; Attendance: 10,527

Andrei Medvedev
Goalies
Kari Lehtonen

Artyukhin - 10:22	1-0
	1-1	18:28 - Niinimäki (Bergenheim, Ruutu) (PP)
Trubachev - 43:28	2-1
Perezhogin (Grigorenko) - 44:05	3-1
Grigorenko - 47:22	4-1

29
Shots
26

January 3, 2003; 20:10	Canada	3–2 (1–1, 1–0, 1–1)	United States	Halifax Metro Centre, Halifax; Attendance: 10,594

Marc-André Fleury
Goalies
Robert Goepfert

Paetsch (Wellwood) - 4:24	1-0
	1-1	9:12 - Nystrom (Parise) (SH)
Bouchard (Parenteau, Colaiacovo) (PP) - 37:26	2-1
	2-2	41:06 - Kesler (Wisniewski, Stuart) (PP)
Woywitka (Stajan, Tootoo) - 51:40	3-2

42
Shots
15

==== 5th place game ====
January 4, 2003; 12:00	Czech Republic	0–2 (0–1, 0–0, 0–1)	Slovakia	Halifax Metro Centre, Halifax; Attendance: 10,210

Lukáš Mensator	Goalies	Peter Ševela
0-1 / 19:30 - Zagora (Špirko, Maron); 0-2 / 55:00- Lipka (Ševela)
25	Shots	18

==== Bronze medal game ====
January 5, 2003; 16:00	United States	2–3 (0–2, 0–1, 2–0)	Finland (bronze)	Halifax Metro Centre, Halifax; Attendance: 10,306

Bobby Goepfert
Goalies
Tuomas Nissinen

	0-1	9:16 - Jokinen (Kalteva)
	0-2	18:15 - Juntunen (Ruutu, Jokinen) (PP)
	0-3	20:31 - Pitkänen (Ruutu)
55:18 - Suter	1-3
58:04 - Brown (Parise, Shannon)	2-3

31
Shots
21

==== Final ====
January 5, 2003; 20:10	(silver) Canada	2–3 (1–1, 1–0, 0–2)	Russia (gold)	Halifax Metro Centre, Halifax; Attendance: 10,594

Marc-André Fleury
Goalies
Andrei Medvedev
Referee:
(Sweden) Ulf Rädbjer

	0-1	11:17 – Taratukhin (Grigorenko, Perezhogin)
Parenteau (Laich, White) – 12:01	1-1
Upshall (Laich, Parenteau) (PP) – 36:22	2-1
	2-2	44:22 – Grigorenko (Taratukhin, Perezhogin)
	2-3	51:09 – Trubachev (Polushin, Tyutin)

24
Shots
31

=== Scoring leaders ===
Rank	Player	Country	Pos	GP	G	A	Pts	PIM	+/−
1	Patrik Bärtschi	Switzerland	F	6	6	4	10	0	+1
1	Igor Grigorenko	Russia	F	6	6	4	10	4	+10
3	Yuri Trubachev	Russia	F	6	3	7	10	2	+9
4	Tuomo Ruutu	Finland	F	7	2	8	10	6	+6
5	Carlo Colaiacovo	Canada	D	6	1	9	10	2	-1
6	Alexander Perezhogin	Russia	F	6	3	6	9	4	+9
7	Jussi Jokinen	Finland	F	7	6	2	8	2	+4
8	Zach Parise	United States	F	7	4	4	8	4	+2
9	Alexander Polushin	Russia	F	6	2	6	8	4	+9
9	Andrei Taratukhin	Russia	F	6	2	6	8	8	+7

=== Goaltending leaders ===
Minimum 40% of team's ice time.

Rank	Player	Country	TOI	SOG	GA	GAA	Saves	Sv %	SO
1	Robert Goepfert	United States	338:05	159	10	1.77	149	93.71	0
2	Peter Ševela	Slovakia	218:46	105	7	1.92	98	93.33	2
3	Marc-André Fleury	Canada	267:28	97	7	1.57	90	92.78	1
4	Kari Lehtonen	Finland	356:40	168	13	2.19	155	92.26	2
5	Andrei Medvedev	Russia	300:00	108	9	1.80	99	91.67	1

=== Tournament awards ===
	Goaltender	Defencemen		Forwards		
IIHF Directorate Awards	(Canada) Marc-André Fleury	(Finland) Joni Pitkänen		(Russia) Igor Grigorenko		
Media All-Star Team	(Canada) Marc-André Fleury	(Canada) Carlo Colaiacovo	(Finland) Joni Pitkänen	(Russia) Yuri Trubachev	(Russia) Igor Grigorenko	(Canada) Scottie Upshall

=== Final standings ===
	Team
1st place, gold medalist(s)	Russia
2nd place, silver medalist(s)	Canada
3rd place, bronze medalist(s)	Finland
4	United States
5	Slovakia
6	Czech Republic
7	Switzerland
8	Sweden
9	Germany
10	Belarus

== Division I ==
The Division I championships were played on December 27, 2002 – January 2, 2003 in Almaty, Kazakhstan (Group A), and on December 16–22, 2002 in Bled, Slovenia (Group B).

=== Group A ===
Pos	Team	Pld	W	D	L	GF	GA	GD	Pts	Promotion or relegation	Ukraine men's national junior ice hockey team	Japan men's national junior ice hockey team	Kazakhstan men's national junior ice hockey team	France men's national junior ice hockey team	Italy men's national junior ice hockey team	Croatia men's national junior ice hockey team
1	Ukraine	5	4	1	0	18	8	+10	9	Promoted to the 2004 Top Division		3–1	3–3	3–0	3–1	6–3
2	Japan	5	4	0	1	24	10	+14	8		1–3		6–2	4–2	4–2	9–1
3	Kazakhstan	5	3	1	1	25	12	+13	7		3–3	2–6		3–0	4–2	13–1
4	France	5	2	0	3	17	13	+4	4		0–3	2–4	0–3		5–2	10–1
5	Italy	5	1	0	4	11	16	−5	2		1–3	2–4	2–4	2–5		4–0
6	Croatia	5	0	0	5	6	42	−36	0	Relegated to the 2004 Division II	3–6	1–9	1–13	1–10	0–4	

Source: IIHF.com at the Wayback Machine
Legend: Blue = home team win; Yellow = draw; Red = away team win.

=== Group B ===
Pos	Team	Pld	W	D	L	GF	GA	GD	Pts	Promotion or relegation	Austria men's national junior ice hockey team	Slovenia men's national junior ice hockey team	Norway men's national junior ice hockey team	Latvia men's national junior ice hockey team	Denmark men's national junior ice hockey team	Poland men's national junior ice hockey team
1	Austria	5	5	0	0	35	9	+26	10	Promoted to the 2004 Top Division		8–1	6–4	6–1	6–2	9–1
2	Slovenia	5	3	1	1	15	14	+1	7		1–8		4–0	5–3	2–2	3–1
3	Norway	5	2	1	2	17	16	+1	5		4–6	0–4		1–1	6–2	6–3
4	Latvia	5	1	1	3	13	21	−8	3		1–6	3–5	1–1		4–3	4–6
5	Denmark	5	1	1	3	18	19	−1	3		2–6	2–2	2–6	3–4		9–1
6	Poland	5	1	0	4	12	31	−19	2	Relegated to the 2004 Division II	1–9	1–3	3–6	6–4	1–9	

Source: IIHF.com at the Wayback Machine
Legend: Blue = home team win; Yellow = draw; Red = away team win.

== Division II ==
The Division II championships were played on January 6–12, 2003, in Miercurea-Ciuc, Romania (Group A), and on December 28, 2002 – January 3, 2003 in Novi Sad, Federal Republic of Yugoslavia (Group B).

=== Group A ===
Pos	Team	Pld	W	D	L	GF	GA	GD	Pts	Promotion or relegation	Estonia men's national junior ice hockey team	Great Britain men's national junior ice hockey team	Romania men's national junior ice hockey team	Lithuania men's national junior ice hockey team	South Africa men's national junior ice hockey team	Bulgaria men's national junior ice hockey team
1	Estonia	5	5	0	0	62	8	+54	10	Promoted to the 2004 Division I		5–2	13–1	6–1	17–4	21–0
2	Great Britain	5	4	0	1	64	7	+57	8		2–5		9–1	13–1	21–0	19–0
3	Romania	5	3	0	2	34	26	+8	6		1–13	1–9		9–3	8–1	15–0
4	Lithuania	5	2	0	3	21	31	−10	4		1–6	1–13	3–9		9–1	7–2
5	South Africa	5	1	0	4	12	58	−46	2		4–17	0–21	1–8	1–9		6–3
6	Bulgaria	5	0	0	5	5	68	−63	0	Relegated to the 2004 Division III	0–21	0–19	0–15	2–7	3–6	

Source: IIHF.com at the Wayback Machine
Legend: Blue = home team win; Yellow = draw; Red = away team win.

=== Group B ===
Pos	Team	Pld	W	D	L	GF	GA	GD	Pts	Promotion or relegation	Hungary men's national junior ice hockey team	Netherlands men's national junior ice hockey team	Serbia and Montenegro men's national junior ice hockey team	Spain men's national junior ice hockey team	Iceland men's national junior ice hockey team	Mexico men's national junior ice hockey team
1	Hungary	5	5	0	0	47	14	+33	10	Promoted to the 2004 Division I		6–1	10–3	10–4	15–4	6–2
2	Netherlands	5	4	0	1	34	13	+21	8		1–6		5–4	8–0	15–2	5–1
3	FR Yugoslavia	5	3	0	2	27	22	+5	6		3–10	4–5		4–2	8–5	8–0
4	Spain	5	1	1	3	12	26	−14	3		4–10	0–8	2–4		4–4	2–0
5	Iceland	5	1	1	3	19	43	−24	3		4–15	2–15	5–8	4–4		4–1
6	Mexico	5	0	0	5	4	25	−21	0	Relegated to the 2004 Division III	2–6	1–5	0–8	0–2	1–4	

Source: IIHF.com at the Wayback Machine
Legend: Blue = home team win; Yellow = draw; Red = away team win.

== Division III ==
The Division III championship was played on January 21–26, 2003 in İzmit, Turkey.

Pos	Team	Pld	W	D	L	GF	GA	GD	Pts	Promotion	South Korea men's national junior ice hockey team	Belgium men's national junior ice hockey team	Turkey men's national junior ice hockey team	Australia men's national junior ice hockey team	Luxembourg men's national junior ice hockey team
1	South Korea	4	4	0	0	37	5	+32	8	Promoted to the 2004 Division II		5–2	5–2	10–1	17–0
2	Belgium	4	3	0	1	32	10	+22	6	Promoted to the 2004 Division II	2–5		7–4	9–1	14–0
3	Turkey	4	2	0	2	26	16	+10	4		2–5	4–7		6–3	14–1
4	Australia	4	1	0	3	8	25	−17	2		1–10	1–9	3–6		3–0
5	Luxembourg	4	0	0	4	1	48	−47	0		0–17	0–14	1–14	0–3	

Source: IIHF.com at the Wayback Machine
Legend: Blue = home team win; Yellow = draw; Red = away team win.

Preceded by 2002 World Juniors	World Junior Ice Hockey Championships; See also: 2003 World Championships	Succeeded by 2004 World Juniors
