= Sean Bergenheim =

Finnish ice hockey player (born 1984)

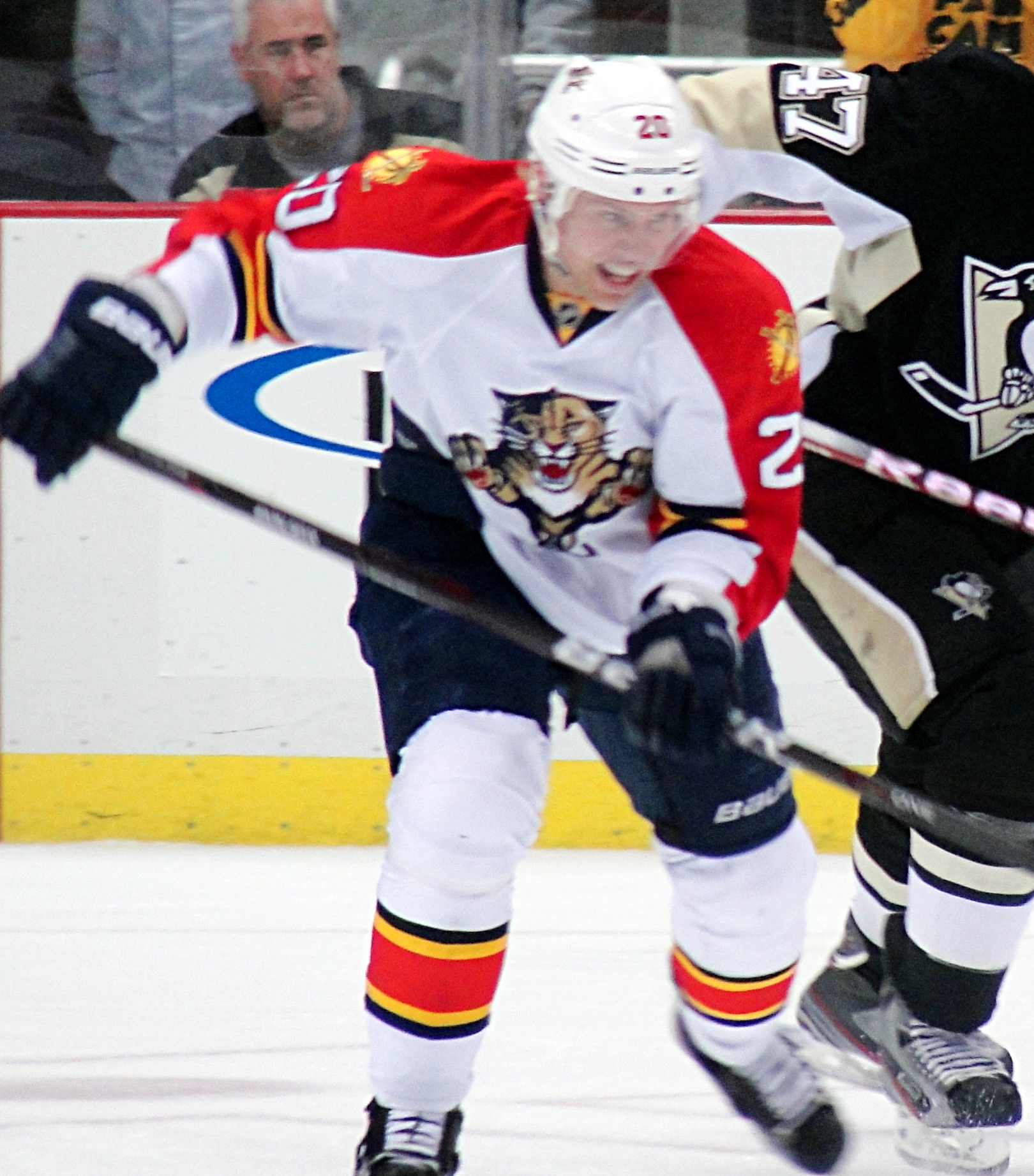
- Bergenheim with the Florida Panthers in March 2012
- Born: February 8, 1984 (age 42) Helsinki, Finland
- Height: 5 ft 10 in (178 cm)
- Weight: 205 lb (93 kg; 14 st 9 lb)
- Position: Left wing
- Shot: Left
- Played for: Jokerit; New York Islanders; Lokomotiv Yaroslavl; Tampa Bay Lightning; Florida Panthers; HIFK; Minnesota Wild; SC Bern; Frölunda HC
- National team: Finland
- NHL draft: 22nd overall, 2002; New York Islanders
- Playing career: 2001–2018

Sean Bergenheim (born February 8, 1984) is a Finnish former professional ice hockey winger who played in the National Hockey League (NHL) for the New York Islanders, Tampa Bay Lightning, Florida Panthers and Minnesota Wild.

== Playing career ==
Bergenheim played in Jokerit of the SM-liiga for three seasons, from 2001 to 2004, winning the Finnish championship in 2002. He was drafted by the New York Islanders as their first pick in the 2002 NHL entry draft, 22nd overall. In 2003, Bergenheim signed a three-year contract with the Islanders and played 18 games for the Islanders in his debut season, 2003–04. He scored his first NHL goal—a short-handed goal—against the Pittsburgh Penguins. He was transferred back to Jokerit in January 2004, and moved back to the American Hockey League (AHL)'s Bridgeport Sound Tigers in April for the 2004 Calder Cup playoffs and for the subsequent 2004–05 AHL season, during the 2004–05 NHL lockout.

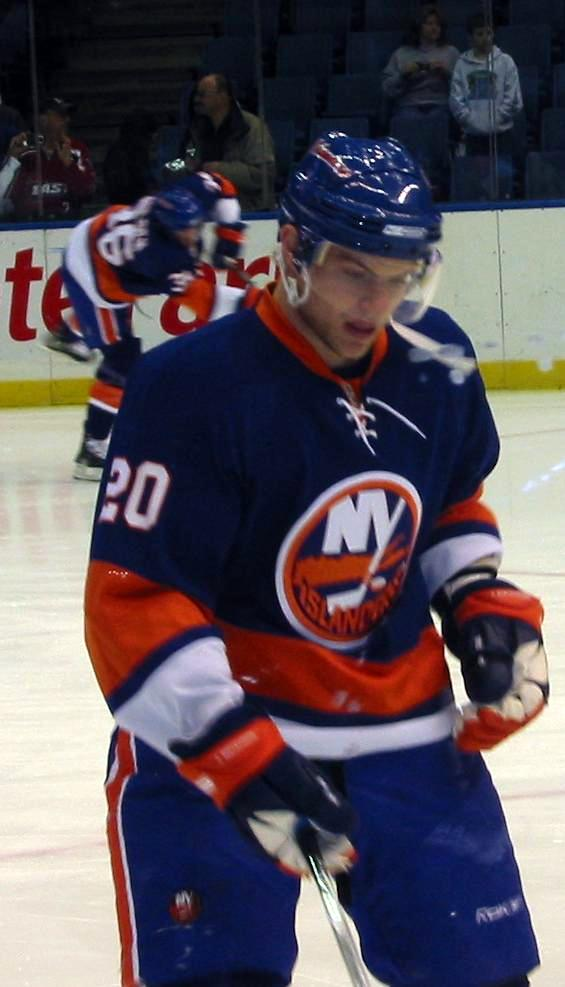
Bergenheim With the New York Islanders

Bergenheim spent most of the 2005–06 season playing in the AHL for the Sound Tigers. His breakout in the AHL finally brought him back to the Islanders, but he was unable to agree to a new contract with the team in the 2006 off-season, after which he signed with Lokomotiv Yaroslavl in the Russian Superleague.

On October 31, 2006, Bergenheim signed a one-year contract with the Swedish Elitserien team Frölunda HC. During his time with the club, he played on a productive line alongside forwards Steve Kariya and Martin Plüss.

On June 18, 2007, Bergenheim signed a one-year contract with the Islanders to return to the NHL. During the 2007–08 season, his first full season in the NHL, on March 4, 2008, he became the 350th different New York Islander skater to register a goal at Madison Square Garden.

Having scoring 10 goals in 78 games with the Islanders in the 2007–08 season, on July 14, 2008, Bergenheim signed a two-year contract extension with the club. With higher expectations for the 2008–09 season, he scored 7 points in the first 16 games before he was felled by injury and illness that caused him to miss 26 games. Returning to health in the second half of the season, Bergenheim had his first multi-goal game with two goals to help the Islanders shut-out the Buffalo Sabres 2–0 on February 28, 2009. His strong form with New York continued, and on March 7, 2009, Bergenheim recorded his first career NHL hat-trick, against the New Jersey Devils. He finished the season with a career-high 15 goals in 59 games.

After the 2009–10 season, on August 17, 2010, Bergenheim left the Islanders and signed as a free agent to a one-year contract with the Tampa Bay Lightning. In his first appearance in the Stanley Cup playoffs, despite having only 14 goals in 80 games during the regular season, Bergenheim finished with 9 goals in 16 games en route to series victories over the Pittsburgh Penguins and a sweep of the Washington Capitals before the Lightning finally fell to the eventual Stanley Cup champions, the Boston Bruins, in seven games.

On July 1, 2011, Bergenheim signed a four-year, $11 million contract with the Florida Panthers. In the final year of his contract in the 2014–15 season, Bergenheim was used in rotation in the Panthers' starting lineup. After requesting a trade, on February 24, 2015, he was traded (along with a seventh-round pick in the 2016 NHL entry draft) to the Minnesota Wild in exchange for a third-round draft pick in the same draft.

At the conclusion of his contract, and as an un-signed free agent over the summer, on October 7, 2015, Bergenheim returned to Europe to sign a one-year contract (with the option for two more years) for the 2015–16 season with SC Bern of the Swiss National League A (NLA). In signing with Bern, Bergenheim re-united with former NHL head coach Guy Boucher from his tenure with the Lightning. Under Boucher's successor, Lars Leuenberger, Bergenheim won the 2016 Swiss championship with Bern, but missed parts of the season (including the playoffs) due to a concussion.

As a free agent in the following off-season, on September 20, 2016, Bergenheim returned to North America to participate in the Anaheim Ducks' training camp on a professional try-out contract. Upon his release from the Ducks' roster, he returned to Europe, signing with Swedish powerhouse Frölunda HC on November 4, 2016, where he had played during the 2006–07 campaign.

In February 2018, Bergenheim announced his retirement from professional hockey.

== International play ==
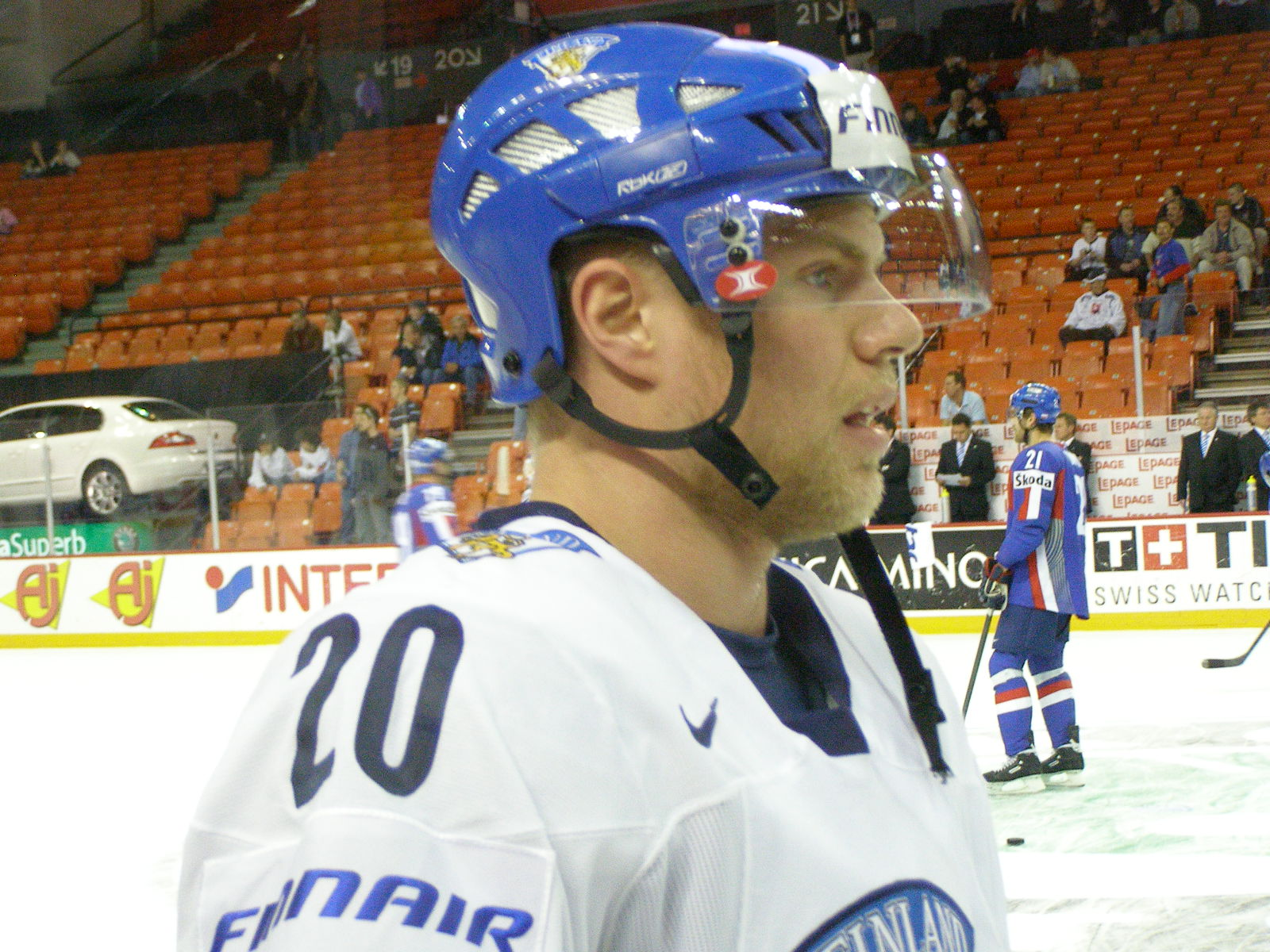

Medal record

Representing Finland

Ice hockey

World Championships
Silver medal – second place	2007 Moscow	
Bronze medal – third place	2008 Quebec City	
Bronze medal – third place	2006 Riga	

World Junior Championships
Bronze medal – third place	2004 Helsinki	
Bronze medal – third place	2003 Halifax	
Bronze medal – third place	2002 Pardubice	

IIHF U18 Championships
Bronze medal – third place	2001 Helsinki	

Bergenheim has represented Finland in the World U18 Championships as well as the World Junior Championships, winning one and three bronze medals, respectively.

== Career statistics ==
=== Regular season and playoffs ===
			Regular season					Playoffs
Season	Team	League	GP	G	A	Pts	PIM	GP	G	A	Pts	PIM
2000–01	Jokerit	FIN U18	1	1	0	1	4	6	9	5	14	8
2000–01	Jokerit	FIN U20	18	6	4	10	26	2	0	0	0	4
2001–02	Jokerit	FIN U20	23	11	19	30	36	1	0	0	0	2
2001–02	Jokerit	FIN U18	—	—	—	—	—	5	6	2	8	18
2001–02	Jokerit	SM-l	28	2	2	4	4	—	—	—	—	—
2001–02	Kiekko–Vantaa	FIN.2	4	0	0	0	52	—	—	—	—	—
2002–03	Jokerit	FIN U20	2	3	0	3	2	—	—	—	—	—
2002–03	Jokerit	SM-l	38	3	3	6	4	2	0	0	0	0
2003–04	New York Islanders	NHL	18	1	1	2	4	—	—	—	—	—
2003–04	Jokerit	SM-l	20	2	2	4	18	3	1	1	2	0
2003–04	Bridgeport Sound Tigers	AHL	—	—	—	—	—	7	2	3	5	10
2004–05	Bridgeport Sound Tigers	AHL	61	15	14	29	69	—	—	—	—	—
2005–06	Bridgeport Sound Tigers	AHL	55	25	22	47	112	—	—	—	—	—
2005–06	New York Islanders	NHL	28	4	5	9	20	—	—	—	—	—
2006–07	Lokomotiv Yaroslavl	RSL	9	1	4	5	26	—	—	—	—	—
2006–07	Frölunda HC	SEL	36	16	17	33	80	—	—	—	—	—
2007–08	New York Islanders	NHL	78	10	12	22	62	—	—	—	—	—
2008–09	New York Islanders	NHL	59	15	9	24	64	—	—	—	—	—
2009–10	New York Islanders	NHL	63	10	13	23	45	—	—	—	—	—
2010–11	Tampa Bay Lightning	NHL	80	14	15	29	56	16	9	2	11	8
2011–12	Florida Panthers	NHL	62	17	6	23	48	7	3	3	6	4
2012–13	HIFK	SM-l	2	1	0	1	0	—	—	—	—	—
2013–14	Florida Panthers	NHL	62	16	13	29	40	—	—	—	—	—
2014–15	Florida Panthers	NHL	39	8	10	18	34	—	—	—	—	—
2014–15	Minnesota Wild	NHL	17	1	0	1	6	3	0	0	0	0
2015–16	SC Bern	NLA	21	5	8	13	49	—	—	—	—	—
2016–17	Frölunda HC	SHL	32	5	9	14	39	11	1	2	3	14
2017–18	Frölunda HC	SHL	4	1	2	3	4	—	—	—	—	—
NHL totals			506	96	84	180	379	26	12	5	17	12

=== International ===
Year	Team	Event	Result	GP	G	A	Pts	PIM
2001	Finland	WJC18	3rd place, bronze medalist(s)	6	3	1	4	8
2002	Finland	WJC18	4th	8	8	4	12	6
2002	Finland	WJC	3rd place, bronze medalist(s)	7	0	1	1	4
2003	Finland	WJC	3rd place, bronze medalist(s)	7	2	4	6	6
2004	Finland	WJC	3rd place, bronze medalist(s)	7	1	3	4	2
2006	Finland	WC	3rd place, bronze medalist(s)	9	2	1	3	4
2007	Finland	WC	2nd place, silver medalist(s)	9	1	2	3	31
2008	Finland	WC	3rd place, bronze medalist(s)	4	0	0	0	2
Junior totals				35	14	13	27	26
Senior totals				22	3	3	6	37

== Awards and honours ==
Award	Year
AHL
All-Star Game	2005
CHL
Champions (Frölunda HC)	2017

Awards and achievements
Preceded by Raffi Torres	New York Islanders first round pick 2002	Succeeded by Robert Nilsson
