= Joni Pitkänen =

Finnish ice hockey player (born 1983)

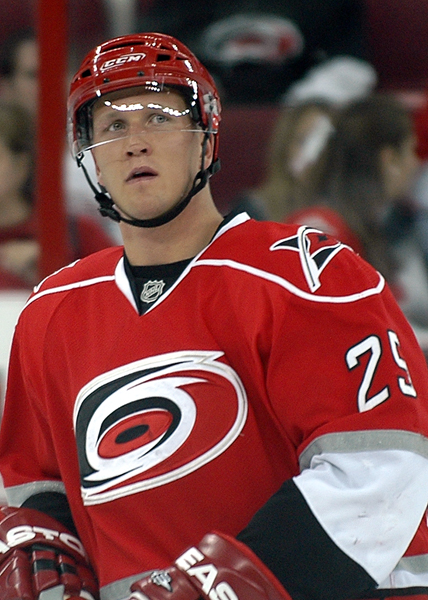
- Pitkänen with the Carolina Hurricanes in 2009
- Born: 19 September 1983 (age 43) Oulu, Finland
- Height: 6 ft 3 in (191 cm)
- Weight: 213 lb (97 kg; 15 st 3 lb)
- Position: Defence
- Shot: Left
- Played for: Oulun Kärpät; Philadelphia Flyers; Edmonton Oilers; Carolina Hurricanes
- National team: Finland
- NHL draft: 4th overall, 2002; Philadelphia Flyers
- Playing career: 2000–2016

Joni Pitkänen (born 19 September 1983) is a Finnish former professional ice hockey defenceman who played in the National Hockey League (NHL) for the Philadelphia Flyers, Edmonton Oilers, and Carolina Hurricanes.

== Playing career ==
Pitkänen started his pro hockey career in the Kärpät organization in the Finnish SM-liiga. After three seasons there he crossed the Atlantic to play for the Philadelphia Flyers, who drafted him in the 2002 NHL entry draft with their first-round draft pick (fourth overall). After a good opening season that saw Pitkänen cement his place on the team lineup, where he was ranked second among NHL rookies with 12 powerplay assists and 17 powerplay points, he played for the Philadelphia Phantoms during the 2004–05 NHL lockout when the team won the Calder Cup. When the NHL resumed in 2005, Pitkänen returned to the Flyers and became the team's top-scoring defenseman, recording 46 points in 58 games. However, he was hampered by injuries during the second half of the season.

When Pitkänen came to the United States to play for the Philadelphia Flyers, he hardly spoke a word of English, so teammate and fellow Finn Sami Kapanen translated for him, and eventually taught him English.

On 14 July 2006, Pitkänen signed a one-year, $2 million contract with Philadelphia. A key member of the Flyers' powerplay unit, Pitkänen was tied for second in powerplay scoring in 2006–07 with 18 points and led Philadelphia with 17 powerplay assists. The 23-year-old defenseman led in ice time in each of the last two seasons with Philadelphia.

Pitkänen was ranked among the NHL's top 25 defensemen in scoring in each of the first two seasons following the 2004–05 NHL lockout. His 43 points in 2006–07 ranked him 22nd, while his career-high 46 points in 2005–06 placed him 19th. He was also among the 2006–07 NHL blueline leaders in assists (16th) and ice time (20th with 24:32 minutes per-game).

On 1 July 2007, Pitkänen was traded to the Edmonton Oilers along with Geoff Sanderson and a third round draft choice in the 2009 NHL entry draft in exchange for Jason Smith and Joffrey Lupul. On 20 July 2007, Pitkänen signed a one-year contract with the Oilers. With the Oilers, Pitkänen scored 26 points in 63 games.

On 1 July 2008, Pitkänen was traded to the Carolina Hurricanes in exchange for Erik Cole. On 2 July 2008, Pitkänen signed a three-year, $12 million contract with the Carolina Hurricanes as a restricted free agent.

On April 2, 2013, during a contest with the Washington Capitals, Pitkänen suffered an injury to his heel following a race to reach an iced puck. The following year the NHL would change the icing rules to use hybrid icing to help avoid similar incidents.

The injury he received caused Pitkänen to miss entire 2013-14 season, his last under contract to the Hurricanes.

In early December 2014 it was reported that Pitkänen had started light training with Oulun Kärpät of the Finnish Liiga, skating for the first time since his injury.

On February 5, 2016, it was announced that Pitkänen had signed a deal with Oulun Kärpät for the rest of the season. He played his first game in almost three years on February 6 against KalPa. On February 25, 2016, Pitkänen announced he would retire once more from ice-hockey after playing three games with Oulun Kärpät.

== Career statistics ==
=== Regular season and playoffs ===
			Regular season					Playoffs
Season	Team	League	GP	G	A	Pts	PIM	GP	G	A	Pts	PIM
1999–2000	Kärpät	FIN U18	36	12	14	26	26	6	1	4	5	2
1999–2000	Kärpät	FIN U20	2	0	0	0	0	—	—	—	—	—
2000–01	Kärpät	FIN U20	24	6	11	17	77	—	—	—	—	—
2000–01	Kärpät	SM-l	21	0	0	0	10	2	0	0	0	2
2001–02	Kärpät	FIN U20	—	—	—	—	—	1	0	0	0	0
2001–02	Kärpät	SM-l	49	4	15	19	65	4	0	0	0	12
2002–03	Kärpät	SM-l	35	5	15	20	38	—	—	—	—	—
2003–04	Philadelphia Flyers	NHL	71	8	19	27	44	15	0	3	3	6
2004–05	Philadelphia Phantoms	AHL	76	6	35	41	105	21	3	4	7	16
2005–06	Philadelphia Flyers	NHL	58	13	33	46	78	6	0	2	2	2
2006–07	Philadelphia Flyers	NHL	77	4	39	43	88	—	—	—	—	—
2007–08	Edmonton Oilers	NHL	63	8	18	26	56	—	—	—	—	—
2008–09	Carolina Hurricanes	NHL	71	7	26	33	58	18	0	8	8	16
2009–10	Carolina Hurricanes	NHL	71	6	40	46	72	—	—	—	—	—
2010–11	Carolina Hurricanes	NHL	72	5	30	35	60	—	—	—	—	—
2011–12	Carolina Hurricanes	NHL	30	5	12	17	16	—	—	—	—	—
2012–13	Carolina Hurricanes	NHL	22	1	8	9	12	—	—	—	—	—
2015–16	Kärpät	Liiga	3	1	0	1	2	—	—	—	—	—
Liiga totals			108	10	30	40	115	6	0	0	0	14
NHL totals			535	57	225	282	484	39	0	13	13	24

=== International ===
Medal record

Men's ice hockey

Representing Finland

Olympic Games
Bronze medal – third place	2010 Vancouver	

World Junior Championships
Bronze medal – third place	2002 Pardubice	
Bronze medal – third place	2003 Nova Scotia	

Year	Team	Event	Result	GP	G	A	Pts	PIM
2001	Finland	U18		4	0	2	2	6
2002	Finland	WJC	3rd place, bronze medalist(s)	7	1	3	4	0
2003	Finland	WJC	3rd place, bronze medalist(s)	7	1	5	6	0
2010	Finland	OG	3rd place, bronze medalist(s)	5	1	2	3	29
Junior totals				18	2	8	10	6
Senior totals				5	1	2	3	29

== Awards ==
- 2003–04: All-Rookie Team (NHL)
- 2003–04: Played in the YoungStars Game (NHL)
- 2004–05: Calder Cup (Philadelphia Phantoms)
- 2005–06: Barry Ashbee Trophy (Philadelphia Flyers)
- 2005–06: Pelle Lindbergh Memorial (Philadelphia Flyers)

Preceded by Jeff Woywitka	Philadelphia Flyers' first-round draft pick 2002	Succeeded by Jeff Carter
