= NHL YoungStars Game =

2002–2009 hockey match

The NHL Young-Star Game was an annual match held as part of the National Hockey League All-Star Game weekend activities, which ran from the 2002 All-Star Game to the 2009 game, featuring notable young NHL players and leading prospects.

Replacing the Heroes of Hockey Old-Timers matches during the All-Star Weekend activities, the first four games were played as separate games to the actual All-Star Game, but starting in 2008, it was changed to become part of the NHL Super Skills Competition, with the winning team gaining a point for their conference. It was not held in 2005 due to that year's league lockout, or in 2006 due to the All-Star Game not being held so that NHL players could participate in the 2006 Winter Olympics. Through the years, the game implemented different formats and rules. It was discontinued after 2009 and has not been played since.

== 2002 National Hockey League All-Star Game ==
=== The format ===
The game's format:

- Four skaters (and one goaltender) per side.
- The duration of the first and second periods was 12 minutes, running time. The third period was 11 minutes, running time, plus a final minute of stop time. There was a four-minute break between periods.

The players were divided into two teams and led behind the bench by former Los Angeles Kings player and broadcaster Jim Fox and former NHL player, Kings head coach, and ESPN analyst Barry Melrose.

==== The game ====
Atlanta's rookie star Ilya Kovalchuk scored six goals to pace Team Melrose to a 13–7 victory over Team Fox. Kovalchuk scored four times at even strength, once short-handed, and once on a penalty shot; his sixth goal came against an empty net at the end of the game. Kovalchuk was named the first-ever YoungStars MVP. The Edmonton Oilers' forward Mike Comrie scored three goals and added an assist to lead Team Fox in scoring.

	Team Melrose	Team Fox
Final score	13	7
Head coach	(Canada) Barry Melrose	(Canada) Jim Fox
Lineup	Forwards: 13 - Pavel Datsyuk (Detroit Red Wings) - y; 15 - Dany Heatley (Atlanta Thrashers); 17 - Scott Hartnell (Nashville Predators); 22 - Kristian Huselius (Florida Panthers); 17 - Ilya Kovalchuk (Atlanta Thrashers) - MVP; 11 - David Legwand (Nashville Predators); 19 - Brad Richards (Tampa Bay Lightning); 14 - Justin Williams (Philadelphia Flyers); Defence: 23 - Paul Mara (Phoenix Coyotes) - y; 28 - Robyn Regehr (Calgary Flames); 45 - David Tanabe (Carolina Hurricanes); Goaltender: 1 - Roberto Luongo (Florida Panthers)	Forwards: 19 - Kyle Calder (Chicago Blackhawks); 89 - Mike Comrie (Edmonton Oilers); 18 - Tim Connolly (Buffalo Sabres); 12 - Mike Fisher (Ottawa Senators) - y; 10 - Marian Gaborik (Minnesota Wild); 10 - Brenden Morrow (Dallas Stars); 71 - Mike Ribeiro (Montreal Canadiens); Defence: 44 - Nick Boynton (Boston Bruins); 7 - Andrew Ference (Pittsburgh Penguins); 23 - Karel Rachunek (Ottawa Senators); Goaltender: 31 - Dan Blackburn (New York Rangers)
Scoring summary	Heatley (Datsyuk) 4:19 1st; Hartnell (Tanabe) 5:13 1st; Kovalchuk (Richards, Hartnell) 5:37 1st; Kovalchuk 2 (Tanabe) 10:24 1st; Richards (Kovalchuk) 11:59 1st; Kovalchuk 3 (Legwand, Williams) 0:22 2nd; Legwand (Mara) 1:27 2nd; Huselius (Richards, Datsyuk) 3:44 2nd (GWG); Legwand (Mara, Heatley) 7:17 2nd; Kovalchuk 4 (unassisted) 10:42 2nd (SHG); Huselius (Legwand, Heatley) 7:47 3rd; Kovalchuk 5 (penalty shot) 9:48 3rd; Kovalchuk 6 (Williams, Mara) 11:38 3rd (ENG)	Comrie (Ribeiro, Morrow) 1:38 1st; Connolly (Comrie) 4:31 1st; Comrie (unassisted) 4:46 1st; Calder (Fisher, Rachunek) 5:56 2nd; Morrow (Ribeiro) 11:52 2nd; Comrie (Ribeiro) 6:35 3rd; Ribeiro (Calder) 11:48 3rd
Penalties	Luongo (delay of game) 9:24 2nd	none
Shots on goal	10–9–10–26	18–13–13–43
Win/loss	W - Roberto Luongo	L - Dan Blackburn

==== Notes ====
- y — were named as injury replacements.
- Krystofer Kolanos (Phoenix Coyotes) and Rostislav Klesla (Columbus Blue Jackets) were selected to play for Team Melrose, but were unable to play due to injury.
- Martin Havlat (Ottawa Senators) and Alex Tanguay (Colorado Avalanche) were selected to play for Team Fox, but were unable to play due to injury.

== 2003 National Hockey League All-Star Game ==
=== The format ===
The assistant coaches of the teams with the best points percentages in their respective conferences were selected as coaches for the Eastern Conference and Western Conference YoungStars, respectively.

The YoungStars players were selected by the NHL's Hockey Operations Department, in consultation with League General Managers.

The game's format:

- The game was played using five skaters and one goaltender per team.
- The duration was three 10-minute periods, running time with 15-second stops after goals.
- There was a four-minute break between periods.
- The Eastern Conference was considered the "home" team.

==== The game ====
Washington's Brian Sutherby won the MVP award for the Eastern Conference YoungStars by scoring two goals and an assist as the East cruised to an easy 8–3 victory. Stephen Weiss of the host team Florida Panthers scored a goal and an assist for the East.

	East	West
Final score	8	3
Head coaches	Roger Neilson, Perry Pearn, Don Jackson (Ottawa Senators)	Jack McIlhargey, Mike Johnson (Vancouver Canucks)
Lineup	Forwards: 55 - Pavel Brendl (Philadelphia Flyers); 14 - Niklas Hagman (Florida Panthers); 81 - Marcel Hossa (Montreal Canadiens); 24 - Taylor Pyatt (Buffalo Sabres); 46 - Brian Sutherby (Washington Capitals) - MVP; 16 - Alexander Svitov (Tampa Bay Lightning); 11 - Mattias Weinhandl (New York Islanders); 9 - Stephen Weiss (Florida Panthers); Defence: 4 - Jay Bouwmeester (Florida Panthers); 36 - Dennis Seidenberg (Philadelphia Flyers); 10 - Henrik Tallinder (Buffalo Sabres); 24 - Anton Volchenkov (Ottawa Senators); Goaltender: 30 - Ryan Miller (Buffalo Sabres)	Forwards: 39 - Tyler Arnason (Chicago Blackhawks); 23 - Stanislav Chistov (Mighty Ducks of Anaheim); 24 - Alexander Frolov (Los Angeles Kings); 18 - Adam Hall (Nashville Predators); 10 - Shawn Horcoff (Edmonton Oilers); 39 - Niko Kapanen (Dallas Stars); 61 - Rick Nash (Columbus Blue Jackets); 29 - Branko Radivojevic (Phoenix Coyotes); Defence: 5 - Barret Jackman (St. Louis Blues); 44 - Rostislav Klesla (Columbus Blue Jackets); 4 - Jordan Leopold (Calgary Flames); 55 - Nick Schultz (Minnesota Wild); 4 - Ossi Vaananen (Phoenix Coyotes); Goaltender: 1 - David Aebischer (Colorado Avalanche)
Scoring summary	Brendl (Svitov, Hossa) 2:28 1st; Volchenkov (Weinhandl, Weiss) 6:26 1st; Weiss (unassisted) 7:06 1st; Sutherby (Seidenberg, Hossa) 7:58 1st (GWG); Weinhandl (unassisted) 2:40 3rd; Pyatt (Sutherby) 7:59 3rd; Sutherby (Bouwmeester, Seidenberg) 9:05 3rd; Brendl (unassisted) 9:45 3rd	Hall (Nash, Schultz) 9:06 1st; Nash (Arnason, Hall) 9:26 1st; Nash (Radivojevic, Horcoff) 6:48 2nd
Penalties	none	none
Shots on goal	11–7–11–29	3–5–5–13
Win/loss	W - Ryan Miller	L - David Aebischer

- Erik Cole (Carolina Hurricanes) was named to the YoungStars game, but did not play due to a broken leg he suffered two days before the game.
- Ales Hemsky (Edmonton Oilers) was named to the YoungStars game, but did not play and was replaced by Horcoff.

== 2004 National Hockey League All-Star Game ==
=== The format ===
The game went back to the four-on-four format with each roster consisting of six forwards, four defensemen, and one goaltender. The game was played in three 10-minute running-clock periods and a four-minute intermission between each period. The head coaches of the game were Lou Nanne and Tom Reid, both former players of the relocated Minnesota North Stars, with Minnesota being the venue of the All-Star Game for the first time in twenty seasons.

==== The game ====
The Western Conference defeated the Eastern Conference 7–3. Anaheim's Joffrey Lupul scored a hat trick, San Jose's Jonathan Cheechoo picked up four assists, and Colorado goaltender Philippe Sauve was named the Game's MVP, stopping 18 of 21 shots.

	West	East
Final score	7	3
Head coaches	Lou Nanne	Tom Reid
Lineup	Forwards: 96 - Pierre-Marc Bouchard (Minnesota Wild); 14 - Jonathan Cheechoo (San Jose Sharks); 18 - Matthew Lombardi (Calgary Flames); 15 - Joffrey Lupul (Mighty Ducks of Anaheim); 15 - Tuomo Ruutu (Chicago Blackhawks); 14 - Raffi Torres (Edmonton Oilers); 13 - Nikolai Zherdev (Columbus Blue Jackets); Defence: 44 - Christian Ehrhoff (San Jose Sharks); 2 - Dan Hamhuis (Nashville Predators); 5 - Alexei Semenov (Edmonton Oilers); Goaltender: 30 - Philippe Sauve (Colorado Avalanche) - MVP	Forwards: 37 - Patrice Bergeron (Boston Bruins); 7 - Trent Hunter (New York Islanders); 12 - Ryan Malone (Pittsburgh Penguins); 9 - Derek Roy (Buffalo Sabres); 73 - Michael Ryder (Montreal Canadiens); 12 - Eric Staal (Carolina Hurricanes); 14 - Matt Stajan (Toronto Maple Leafs); Defence: 44 - Joni Pitkanen (Philadelphia Flyers); 7 - Paul Martin (New Jersey Devils); 44 - Brooks Orpik (Pittsburgh Penguins); Goaltender: 1 - Andrew Raycroft (Boston Bruins)
Scoring summary	Torres (Cheechoo) 6:45 1st; Zherdev (Ruutu) 9:35 1st; Ehrhoff (Zherdev) 1:35 2nd; Lupul (Cheechoo) 8:22 2nd (GWG); Lupul (Cheechoo) 2:05 3rd; Bouchard (unassisted) 4:31 3rd; Lupul (Cheechoo) 6:42 3rd	Staal (Bergeron, Ryder) 5:24 1st; Malone (Stajan, Martin) 2:23 2nd; Stajan (Hunter) 8:52 3rd
Penalties	none	none
Shots on goal	8–6–10–24	9–9–3–21
Win/loss	W - Philippe Sauve	L - Andrew Raycroft

- Garnet Exelby (Atlanta Thrashers) was named to the YoungStars game, but did not play and was replaced by Stajan.

== 2007 National Hockey League All-Star Game ==
=== The format ===
The format was unchanged from the 2004 game. The assistant coaches in the NHL All-Star Game were chosen as the head coaches for the YoungStars Game.

==== The game ====
The East's win was spurred by the six points from YoungStars MVP Zach Parise of the New Jersey Devils who had two goals and four assists, while Boston's Phil Kessel recorded a hat-trick just one month removed from undergoing successful surgery for testicular cancer.

	East	West
Final score	9	8
Head coaches	Bob Hartley (Atlanta Thrashers)	Barry Trotz (Nashville Predators)
Lineup	Forwards: 44 - Patrick Eaves (Ottawa Senators); 81 - Phil Kessel (Boston Bruins); 71 - Evgeni Malkin (Pittsburgh Penguins); 9 - Zach Parise (New Jersey Devils) - MVP; 11 - Jordan Staal (Pittsburgh Penguins); 10 - Alexander Steen (Toronto Maple Leafs); 26 - Thomas Vanek (Buffalo Sabres); Defence: 52 - Mike Green (Washington Capitals); 14 - Andrej Meszaros (Ottawa Senators); 54 - Paul Ranger (Tampa Bay Lightning); 19 - Ryan Whitney (Pittsburgh Penguins); Goaltender: 32 - Kari Lehtonen (Atlanta Thrashers)	Forwards: 15 - Ryan Getzlaf (Anaheim Ducks); 36 - Jussi Jokinen (Dallas Stars); 11 - Anze Kopitar (Los Angeles Kings); 47 - Alexander Radulov (Nashville Predators); 12 - Lee Stempniak (St. Louis Blues); 8 - Wojtek Wolski (Colorado Avalanche); Defence: 18 - Matt Carle (San Jose Sharks); 7 - Brent Seabrook (Chicago Blackhawks); 5 - Ladislav Smid (Edmonton Oilers); 6 - Shea Weber (Nashville Predators); Goaltender: 31 - Peter Budaj (Colorado Avalanche)
Scoring summary	Parise (Vanek, Perreault) 1:32 1st; Whitney (Staal, Steen) 3:35 1st; Meszaros (Green, Steen) 9:47 1st; Kessel (Ranger, Vanek) 0:26 2nd; Ranger (Green, Parise) 7:39 2nd; Meszaros 2 (Steen, Parise) 9:22 2nd; Kessel 2 (Green, Parise) 1:57 3rd; Parise 2 (Ranger, Kessel) 2:41 3rd; Kessel 3 (Staal, Parise) 4:00 3rd (PPG, GWG)	Kopitar (Weber, Jokinen) 0:27 1st; Jokinen (Kopitar, Budaj) 4:30 1st; Kopitar 2 (Smid) 3:35 2nd; Carle (Wolski, Stempniak) 3:39 3rd (SHG); Getzlaf (Kopitar, Weber) 4:15 3rd; Getzlaf 2 (Kopitar) 5:39 3rd; Carle 2 (Stempniak, Wolski) 7:01 3rd; Radulov (unassisted) 7:51 3rd
Penalties	none	Seabrook (hooking) 3:02 3rd
Shots on goal	8-13-6-28	8-7-9-24
Win/loss	W - Kari Lehtonen	L - Peter Budaj

== 2008 National Hockey League All-Star Game ==
=== The format ===
The game was reduced to two 6-minute periods. In addition, the NHL made the YoungStars game part of the SuperSkills Competition. Furthermore, rookie goaltenders did not participate; instead, the veterans selected to play in the regular All-Star game participated. The coaches were the same head coaches for the main All-Star game.

==== The game ====
Two first period goals and an assist by Brandon Dubinsky gave the East a 6-2 lead. Nicklas Backstrom added one more for the East in the second period, before the West YoungStars made it a close game by scoring four consecutive goals in less than three minutes. Dubinsky was named the MVP.

	East	West
Final score	7	6
Head coaches	John Paddock (Ottawa Senators)	Mike Babcock (Detroit Red Wings)
Lineup	Forwards: Nicklas Backstrom (Washington Capitals); David Clarkson (New Jersey Devils); Brandon Dubinsky (New York Rangers) - MVP; Milan Lucic (Boston Bruins); Defence: Tobias Enstrom (Atlanta Thrashers); Kristopher Letang (Pittsburgh Penguins); Mike Lundin (Tampa Bay Lightning); Marc Staal (New York Rangers); Goaltender: Tim Thomas (Boston Bruins); Tomas Vokoun (Florida Panthers)	Forwards: Sam Gagner (Edmonton Oilers); Patrick Kane (Chicago Blackhawks); Peter Mueller (Phoenix Coyotes); David Perron (St. Louis Blues); Defence: Alexander Edler (Vancouver Canucks); Erik Johnson (St. Louis Blues); Jack Johnson (Los Angeles Kings); Matt Niskanen (Dallas Stars); Goaltender: Chris Osgood (Detroit Red Wings); Manny Legace (St. Louis Blues)
Scoring summary	Clarkson (Enstrom) 0:18 1st; Backstrom (Dubinsky) 2:26 1st; Dubinsky (unassisted) 3:14 1st; Staal (Clarkson) 4:11 1st; Lucic (unassisted) 4:56 1st; Dubinsky 2 (Lundin) 5:41 1st; Backstrom 2 (unassisted) 0:34 2nd	Kane (unassisted) 2:57 1st; Mueller (Niskanen) 5:29 1st; Kane 2 (unassisted) 1:50 2nd; E. Johnson (unassisted) 3:19 2nd; Perron (Mueller) 3:44 2nd; Gagner (E. Johnson) 4:30 2nd
Penalties	none	none
Shots on goal	12-9-21	6-10-16
Win/loss	W - Tim Thomas	L - Chris Osgood

== 2009 National Hockey League All-Star Game ==
=== The format ===
For the final YoungStars match, the format returned to three periods for a total playing time of 18 minutes (6 minutes per period) featuring a three-on-three (four including the goalkeeper) rookies versus sophomores format, consisting of three six-minute periods with the clock stopping only within the last minute of each game. Coaching the rookies was future Hall of Famer Luc Robitaille, and for the sophomores, former All-Star Pete Mahovlich. Pekka Rinne (who replaced Steve Mason) made 20 saves in a 9-5 victory for the rookies. Rookie Blake Wheeler was named the MVP after scoring three goals.

==== The game ====
	Rookie YoungStars	Sophomore YoungStars
Final score	9	5
Head coaches	Luc Robitaille	Pete Mahovlich
Lineup	Forwards: Patrik Berglund (St. Louis Blues); Mikkel Boedker (Phoenix Coyotes); Michael Frolik (Florida Panthers); James Neal (Dallas Stars); Steven Stamkos (Tampa Bay Lightning); Kris Versteeg (Chicago Blackhawks); Blake Wheeler (Boston Bruins) - MVP; Defence: Drew Doughty (Los Angeles Kings); Luke Schenn (Toronto Maple Leafs); Goaltender: Pekka Rinne (Nashville Predators)	Forwards: Dave Bolland (Chicago Blackhawks); Andrew Cogliano (Edmonton Oilers); Brandon Dubinsky (New York Rangers); Bryan Little (Atlanta Thrashers); David Perron (St. Louis Blues); Mason Raymond (Vancouver Canucks); Devin Setoguchi (San Jose Sharks); Defence: Kristopher Letang (Pittsburgh Penguins); Marc Staal (New York Rangers); Goaltender: Carey Price (Montreal Canadiens)
Scoring summary	Berglund (Wheeler, Schenn) 0:29 1st; Wheeler (Neal) 2:00 1st; Stamkos (Schenn, Boedker) 5:48 1st; Berglund 2 (Wheeler, Doughty) 0:24 2nd; Wheeler 2 (Boedker, Stamkos) 3:19 2nd; Schenn (Berglund) 4:08 2nd; Stamkos 2 (Boedker) 5:58 2nd; Wheeler 3 (Boedker, Neal) 1:20 3rd; Doughty (Neal) 4:34 3rd	Bolland (Raymond) 1:28 1st; Staal (Cogliano) 1:43 2nd; Raymond (Perron, Bolland) 2:25 2nd; Staal 2 (Letang) 5:56 2nd; Setoguchi (Little) 2:51 3rd
Penalties	none	none
Shots on goal	11-10-4-25	6-5-13-24
Win/loss	W - Pekka Rinne	L - Carey Price

- Milan Lucic was named to the YoungStars game, but did not play.
- Erik Ersberg was named to the YoungStars game, but did not play.
- Steve Mason was named to the YoungStars game, but did not play.
- Nicklas Backstrom was named to the YoungStars game, but did not play.
- Kris Versteeg was named to the YoungStars game, but did not dress.
