= Scottie Upshall =

Canadian ice hockey player (born 1983)

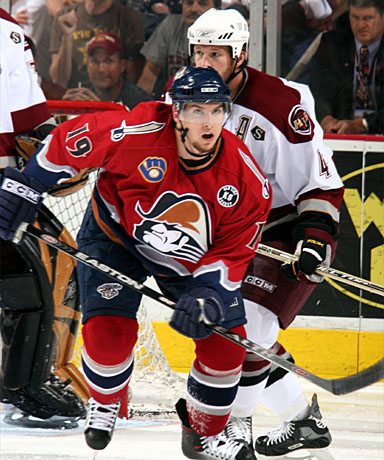
- Upshall with the Milwaukee Admirals in 2006
- Born: October 7, 1983 (age 42) Fort McMurray, Alberta, Canada
- Height: 6 ft 0 in (183 cm)
- Weight: 187 lb (85 kg; 13 st 5 lb)
- Position: Left wing
- Shot: Left
- Played for: Nashville Predators; Philadelphia Flyers; Phoenix Coyotes; Columbus Blue Jackets; Florida Panthers; St. Louis Blues; HC Ambrì-Piotta
- National team: Canada
- NHL draft: 6th overall, 2002; Nashville Predators
- Playing career: 2003–2020

Scott Upshall (born October 7, 1983) is a Canadian former professional ice hockey left winger. He was selected in the 2002 NHL entry draft by the Nashville Predators in the first round, sixth overall.

== Playing career ==
=== Amateur ===
As a youth, Upshall played in the 1996 and 1997 Quebec International Pee-Wee Hockey Tournaments with a minor ice hockey team from Fort McMurray.

Upshall played with the Fort McMurray Oil Barons of the AJHL in 1999–2000 as a sixteen-year-old. In 52 games, Upshall had 26 goals and 52 points, helping the Oil Barons to the Royal Bank Cup. In five games at the Royal Bank Cup, Upshall had two goals and six points, helping the Oil Barons to the championship.

Upshall joined the Kamloops Blazers of the WHL in 2000–01. Upshall had a memorable rookie season, scoring 42 goals and 87 points in 70 games, helping Kamloops to the playoffs. In four playoff games, Upshall had two assists. After the season, he was named to the WHL All-Rookie Team, the CHL All-Rookie Team, and won the Jim Piggott Memorial Trophy as Rookie of the Year in the WHL, as well as the CHL Rookie of the Year.

Upshall had another very solid season with the Blazers in 2001–02, as he had 32 goals and 83 points in 61 games, followed by a goal and three points in four playoff games. Upshall also played for Canada at the 2002 World Juniors, where he had three goals and six points in seven games, helping the Canadians to the silver medal. After beginning the 2002–03 season with the Nashville Predators, Upshall was sent back to Kamloops on November 7, 2002. He then scored 25 goals and 56 points in 42 games with the Blazers. In six playoff games, Upshall had two assists. Upshall once again represented his country at the 2003 World Juniors. Serving as team captain, Upshall recorded four goals and five points en route to a second straight silver medal.

=== Professional ===
==== Nashville Predators ====
Upshall appeared in eight games with the Nashville Predators in 2002–03, where he scored a goal. He was then sent back his junior hockey team, the Kamloops Blazers. After his junior season was over, the Predators assigned Upshall to the Milwaukee Admirals of the AHL, where in two games, he had a goal, followed by going pointless in six playoff games.

In 2003–04, Upshall had an injury plagued season, appearing in 31 games with the Admirals, scoring 13 goals and 24 points. Upshall also had a brief stint with the Predators in the NHL, where he had an assist in seven games. Back with Milwaukee for the playoffs, Upshall had three goals in eight games, as the Admirals won the 2004 Calder Cup. Upshall spent the entire 2004–05 with the Admirals, as Upshall had 19 goals and 46 points in 62 games, followed by two goals and four points in five playoff games.

Upshall spent a majority of the 2005–06 season with the Nashville Predators, as he scored eight goals and 24 points in 48 games with the team. Upshall also appeared in two playoff games with Nashville, getting no points. He also appeared in 23 games with Milwaukee in 2005–06, scoring 17 goals and 33 points. In 14 playoff games with the Admirals, Upshall had six goals and 16 points.

Upshall began the 2006–07 splitting time between Milwaukee and Nashville. In five games with the Admirals, Upshall had an assist, while in 14 games with the Predators, Upshall had two goals and three points. On February 15, 2007, the Predators traded Upshall, Ryan Parent, as well as the Predators' first and third round draft picks in the 2007 NHL entry draft to the Philadelphia Flyers for Peter Forsberg.

==== Philadelphia Flyers ====
Upshall joined a rebuilding Philadelphia Flyers club to finish the 2006–07 season, and in 18 games with the team, he had six goals and 13 points. Upshall became a full-time NHL player in 2007–08, as he scored 14 goals and 30 points in 61 games with the Flyers. In 17 playoff games, Upshall had three goals and seven points, as the Flyers lost to the Pittsburgh Penguins in the Eastern Conference Finals. Upshall became a fan favorite in Philadelphia.

Upshall had a slow start to the 2008–09 season, as in 55 games with Philadelphia, he had seven goals and 21 points. On March 4, 2009, the Flyers traded Upshall and a second round draft pick in the 2011 NHL entry draft to the Phoenix Coyotes for Daniel Carcillo.

==== Phoenix Coyotes and Columbus ====
Upshall scored a goal in his first game with the Phoenix Coyotes, and finished the 2008–09 season with eight goals and 13 points in 19 games with Phoenix. After the season, Upshall played for Canada at the 2009 World Hockey Championship, where he had an assist in eight games. In 49 games with the Coyotes in 2009–10, Upshall had 18 goals and 32 points. Due to injuries, Upshall wasn't able to play with the team in the playoffs. Upshall returned to Phoenix in 2010–11, where he had 16 goals and 27 points in 61 games. On February 28, 2011, the Coyotes traded Upshall and Sami Lepisto to the Columbus Blue Jackets for Rostislav Klesla and Dane Byers.

==== Florida Panthers ====
Upshall signed a four-year contract worth $14 million with the Florida Panthers on July 1, 2011. During his first season with the Panthers in 2011–12, Upshall only skated in 26 games as he was plagued by both a hip injury and sports hernia surgery respectively.

Upshall on was only able to play in 27 games the following season, mainly due to an ankle injury.

==== St. Louis Blues ====
Upshall attended training camp with the St. Louis Blues on a professional tryout contract ahead of the 2015–16 season. Upshall earned a contract with the club, agreeing to a one-year, two-way contract on October 5 worth $700,000.

On June 22, 2016, the Blues re-signed Upshall to a one-year, $900,010 contract. In the 2016–17 season, Upshall improved upon his offensive numbers with the Blues, providing 10 goals and 18 points in 73 regular season games.

The Blues chose not to re-sign Upshall, making him an unrestricted free agent. On September 8, 2017, the Vancouver Canucks signed Upshall to a professional tryout. Upshall was later released from his PTO with the Canucks after the Blues suffered a rash of injuries. On September 30, the Blues signed Upshall to a professional tryout. The following day, the Blues signed him to a one-year, $800,000 contract for the 2017–18 season. Returning to play alongside Kyle Brodziak, Upshall found a regular role on the checking lines of the Blues, registering 7 goals and 19 points in 63 games.

In the off-season, Upshall spent the summer as an unsigned free agent. He agreed to a professional tryout contract with his favorite childhood team, the Edmonton Oilers, on August 19, 2018. He was then dropped by Edmonton on September 24, failing to appear in a single preseason game.

After sitting out for the duration of the 2018–19 season while rehabbing a knee injury, Upshall was signed to a professional tryout contract by the Dallas Stars on August 26, 2019. The team released him from his tryout on September 22.

==== Switzerland ====
On October 30, it was reported that Upshall signed a two-month contract with HC Ambrì-Piotta of the National League (NL) in Switzerland; the contract was confirmed by the club on November 4.

== Retirement ==
On February 24, 2020, Upshall announced his retirement from professional ice hockey.

Upshall, along with fellow former NHL players Shane O' Brien and Jimmy Hayes, hosts the "Missin' Curfew" podcast, where the trio share road stories from their careers and offer commentary on current league news and events. The show debuted in August 2020.

On October 16, 2025, Upshall voiced his support (via social media) for the reinstatement and signing of Carter Hart to the Vegas Golden Knights. This spurred online controversy, as Hart had originally been suspended by the NHL on Sep 12th, pending a sexual assault trial. Hart was reinstated by the NHL on Dec 1st, from his original suspension.

== Career statistics ==
=== Regular season and playoffs ===
			Regular season					Playoffs
Season	Team	League	GP	G	A	Pts	PIM	GP	G	A	Pts	PIM
1999–2000	Fort McMurray Oil Barons	AJHL	52	26	26	52	65	—	—	—	—	—
2000–01	Kamloops Blazers	WHL	70	42	45	87	111	4	0	2	2	10
2001–02	Kamloops Blazers	WHL	61	32	51	83	139	4	1	2	3	21
2002–03	Kamloops Blazers	WHL	50	25	31	56	113	6	0	2	2	34
2002–03	Milwaukee Admirals	AHL	2	1	0	1	2	6	0	0	0	2
2002–03	Nashville Predators	NHL	8	1	0	1	0	—	—	—	—	—
2003–04	Milwaukee Admirals	AHL	31	13	11	24	42	8	3	0	3	4
2003–04	Nashville Predators	NHL	7	0	1	1	0	—	—	—	—	—
2004–05	Milwaukee Admirals	AHL	62	19	27	46	108	5	2	2	4	8
2005–06	Milwaukee Admirals	AHL	23	17	16	33	44	14	6	10	16	20
2005–06	Nashville Predators	NHL	48	8	16	24	34	2	0	0	0	0
2006–07	Nashville Predators	NHL	14	2	1	3	18	—	—	—	—	—
2006–07	Milwaukee Admirals	AHL	5	0	1	1	6	—	—	—	—	—
2006–07	Philadelphia Flyers	NHL	18	6	7	13	8	—	—	—	—	—
2007–08	Philadelphia Flyers	NHL	61	14	16	30	74	17	3	4	7	44
2008–09	Philadelphia Flyers	NHL	55	7	14	21	63	—	—	—	—	—
2008–09	Phoenix Coyotes	NHL	19	8	5	13	26	—	—	—	—	—
2009–10	Phoenix Coyotes	NHL	49	18	14	32	50	—	—	—	—	—
2010–11	Phoenix Coyotes	NHL	61	16	11	27	42	—	—	—	—	—
2010–11	Columbus Blue Jackets	NHL	21	6	1	7	10	—	—	—	—	—
2011–12	Florida Panthers	NHL	26	2	3	5	29	7	1	2	3	4
2012–13	Florida Panthers	NHL	27	4	1	5	25	—	—	—	—	—
2013–14	Florida Panthers	NHL	76	15	22	37	73	—	—	—	—	—
2014–15	Florida Panthers	NHL	63	8	7	15	28	—	—	—	—	—
2015–16	St. Louis Blues	NHL	70	6	8	14	44	17	1	2	3	10
2016–17	St. Louis Blues	NHL	73	10	8	18	45	11	0	0	0	8
2017–18	St. Louis Blues	NHL	63	7	12	19	46	—	—	—	—	—
2019–20	HC Ambrì–Piotta	NL	12	4	3	7	51	—	—	—	—	—
NHL totals			759	138	147	285	615	54	5	8	13	66

=== International ===
Year	Team	Event	Result	GP	G	A	Pts	PIM
2000	Canada Pacific	U17	3rd place, bronze medalist(s)	5	4	4	8	16
2002	Canada	WJC	2nd place, silver medalist(s)	7	3	3	6	10
2003	Canada	WJC	2nd place, silver medalist(s)	6	4	1	5	18
2009	Canada	WC	2nd place, silver medalist(s)	6	0	1	1	27
Junior totals				18	11	8	19	44
Senior totals				8	0	1	1	27

== Awards and honours ==
Award	Year
WHL
CHL All-Rookie Team	2001
Rookie of the Year	2001
All-Rookie Team	2001
Jim Piggott Memorial Trophy	2001
CHL Top Prospects Game	2002
West Second All-Star Team	2002
AHL
Calder Cup	2004

Awards and achievements
Preceded by Dan Hamhuis	Nashville Predators first-round draft pick 2002	Succeeded by Ryan Suter
