= Yuri Trubachev =

Russian professional ice hockey winger (born 1983)

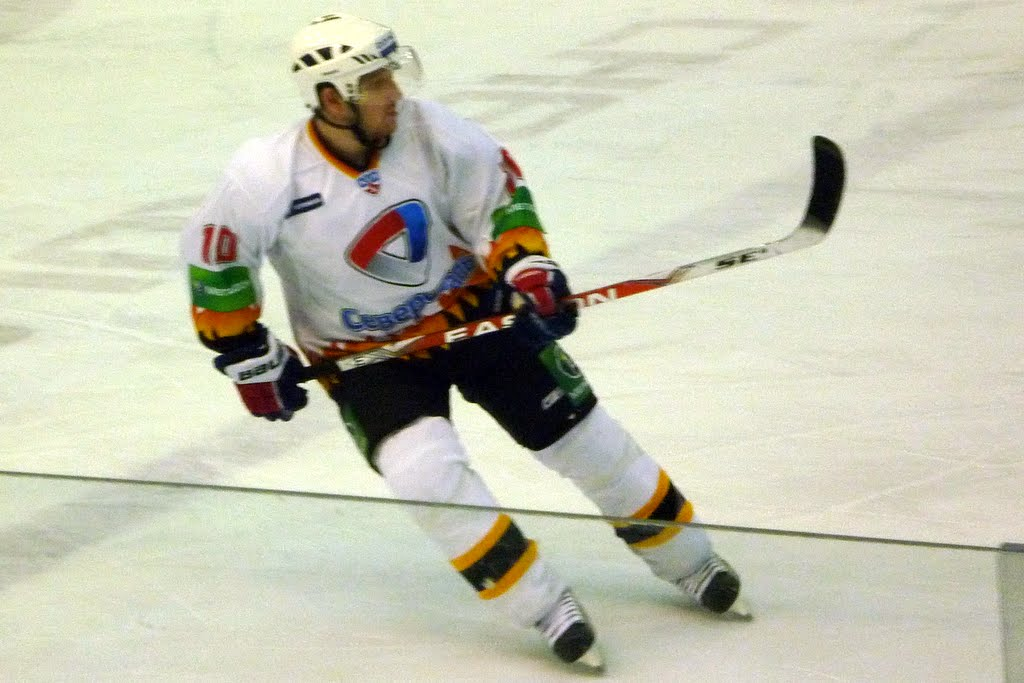
- Born: March 9, 1983 (age 43) Cherepovets, Russian SFSR, USSR
- Height: 5 ft 8 in (173 cm)
- Weight: 203 lb (92 kg; 14 st 7 lb)
- Position: Right wing
- Shot: Left
- Played for: SKA Saint Petersburg; Severstal Cherepovets; Salavat Yulaev Ufa; Atlant Moscow Oblast
- NHL draft: 164th overall, 2001; Calgary Flames
- Playing career: 2000–2021

Yuri Viktorovich Trubachev (Russian: Юрий Викторович Трубачёв; born March 9, 1983) is a Russian former professional ice hockey winger who most notably played for Severstal Cherepovets of the Kontinental Hockey League (KHL). He was selected by the Calgary Flames in the 5th round (164th overall) of the 2001 NHL entry draft. He currently serves as an assistant coach with former club, Severstal Cherepovets.

== Career statistics ==
=== Regular season and playoffs ===
| | | | Regular season | | | | | Playoffs |
| Season | Team | League | GP | G | A | Pts | PIM | GP | G | A | Pts | PIM |
|---|---|---|---|---|---|---|---|---|---|---|---|---|
| 1998–99 | Severstal–2 Cherepovets | RUS.2 | 2 | 0 | 0 | 0 | 0 | — | — | — | — | — |
| 1999–2000 | Severstal–2 Cherepovets | RUS.2 | 42 | 13 | 19 | 32 | 76 | — | — | — | — | — |
| 2000–01 | SKA St. Petersburg | RSL | 34 | 6 | 5 | 11 | 24 | — | — | — | — | — |
| 2001–02 | Severstal Cherepovets | RSL | 34 | 2 | 1 | 3 | 8 | 4 | 0 | 2 | 2 | 0 |
| 2001–02 | Severstal–2 Cherepovets | RUS.3 | 5 | 3 | 3 | 6 | 2 | — | — | — | — | — |
| 2002–03 | Severstal Cherepovets | RSL | 48 | 5 | 7 | 12 | 26 | 12 | 1 | 2 | 3 | 6 |
| 2003–04 | Severstal Cherepovets | RSL | 59 | 8 | 10 | 18 | 50 | — | — | — | — | — |
| 2004–05 | Severstal Cherepovets | RSL | 59 | 12 | 15 | 27 | 44 | — | — | — | — | — |
| 2005–06 | Severstal Cherepovets | RSL | 47 | 7 | 13 | 20 | 69 | 4 | 1 | 0 | 1 | 2 |
| 2006–07 | Severstal Cherepovets | RSL | 51 | 12 | 12 | 24 | 58 | 5 | 1 | 2 | 3 | 16 |
| 2007–08 | Severstal Cherepovets | RSL | 54 | 16 | 16 | 32 | 75 | 8 | 3 | 1 | 4 | 29 |
| 2008–09 | Severstal Cherepovets | KHL | 56 | 17 | 14 | 31 | 52 | — | — | — | — | — |
| 2009–10 | SKA St. Petersburg | KHL | 49 | 7 | 11 | 18 | 12 | 4 | 1 | 0 | 1 | 2 |
| 2010–11 | SKA St. Petersburg | KHL | 7 | 1 | 1 | 2 | 10 | — | — | — | — | — |
| 2010–11 | Severstal Cherepovets | KHL | 45 | 5 | 15 | 20 | 40 | 6 | 1 | 0 | 1 | 2 |
| 2011–12 | Salavat Yulaev Ufa | KHL | 16 | 4 | 2 | 6 | 2 | 6 | 0 | 1 | 1 | 2 |
| 2012–13 | Salavat Yulaev Ufa | KHL | 35 | 5 | 8 | 13 | 22 | 4 | 1 | 1 | 2 | 0 |
| 2013–14 | Atlant Mytishchi | KHL | 54 | 1 | 7 | 8 | 59 | — | — | — | — | — |
| 2014–15 | Severstal Cherepovets | KHL | 48 | 6 | 9 | 15 | 16 | — | — | — | — | — |
| 2015–16 | Severstal Cherepovets | KHL | 57 | 5 | 18 | 23 | 44 | — | — | — | — | — |
| 2016–17 | Severstal Cherepovets | KHL | 59 | 7 | 20 | 27 | 34 | — | — | — | — | — |
| 2017–18 | Severstal Cherepovets | KHL | 49 | 9 | 13 | 22 | 32 | 3 | 0 | 1 | 1 | 6 |
| 2018–19 | Severstal Cherepovets | KHL | 56 | 10 | 12 | 22 | 26 | — | — | — | — | — |
| 2019–20 | Severstal Cherepovets | KHL | 51 | 5 | 9 | 14 | 20 | — | — | — | — | — |
| 2020–21 | Severstal Cherepovets | KHL | 3 | 0 | 0 | 0 | 0 | — | — | — | — | — |
| RSL totals | | | 386 | 68 | 79 | 147 | 354 | 33 | 6 | 7 | 13 | 53 |
| KHL totals | | | 585 | 82 | 139 | 221 | 369 | 23 | 3 | 3 | 6 | 12 |

=== International ===
| Year | Team | Event | GP | G | A | Pts | PIM |
|---|---|---|---|---|---|---|---|
| 2000 | Russia | U17 | 6 | 5 | 5 | 10 | 6 |
| 2000 | Russia | WJC18 | 6 | 2 | 1 | 3 | 2 |
| 2001 | Russia | WJC18 | 6 | 2 | 7 | 9 | 8 |
| 2002 | Russia | WJC | 7 | 2 | 4 | 6 | 4 |
| 2003 | Russia | WJC | 6 | 3 | 7 | 10 | 2 |
| Junior totals | | | 31 | 14 | 24 | 38 | 22 |
