= Garth Murray =

Canadian ice hockey player

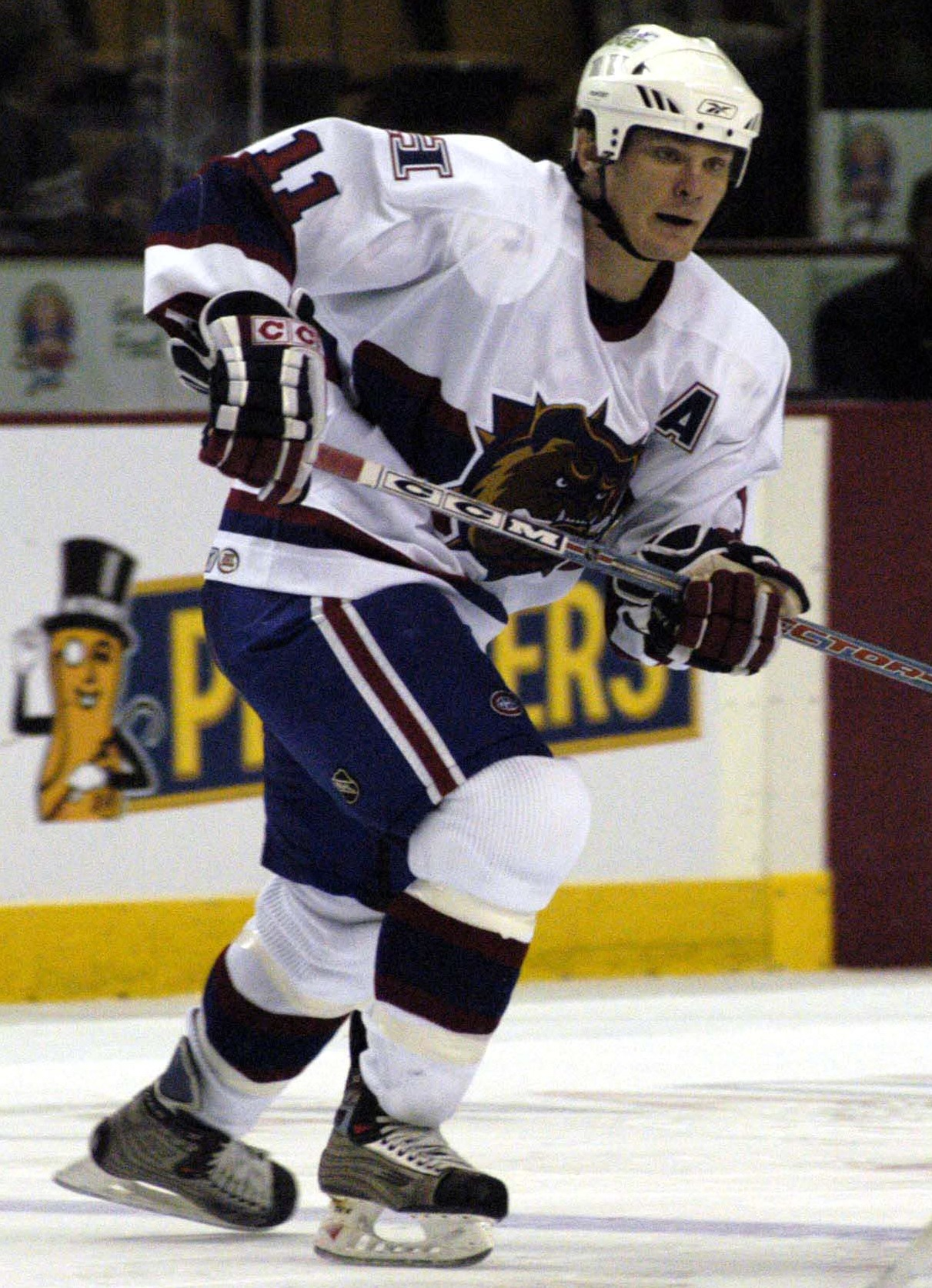
- Murray with the Hamilton Bulldogs in 2005
- Born: September 17, 1982 (age 43) Regina, Saskatchewan, Canada
- Height: 6 ft 2 in (188 cm)
- Weight: 215 lb (98 kg; 15 st 5 lb)
- Position: Centre
- Shot: Left
- Played for: New York Rangers; Montreal Canadiens; Florida Panthers; Phoenix Coyotes
- NHL draft: 79th overall, 2001; New York Rangers
- Playing career: 2002–2012

Garth Robert Murray (born September 17, 1982) is a Canadian former professional ice hockey forward who played in the National Hockey League (NHL) for the New York Rangers, Montreal Canadiens, Florida Panthers and the Phoenix Coyotes.

== Playing career ==
Before being drafted, Murray played hockey in the Western Hockey League, for the Regina Pats. He was never known as a scorer (peaking at 33 goals, 63 points), but made a name for himself for his hard work and willingness to stand up for his teammates, demonstrated by three 150 PIM-exceeding seasons. The New York Rangers took a chance on him, drafting him in the third round, 79th overall, in the 2001 NHL entry draft.

He was a part of team Canada's silver medal team at the 2002 World Junior Hockey Championships.

He played for the New York Rangers' AHL affiliate, the Hartford Wolf Pack, and was briefly called up for a 20-game stint, where he scored one goal and recorded 24 PIMs. At the start of the 2005–2006 season, he was traded by the Rangers to the Montreal Canadiens in exchange for left wing Marcel Hossa.

He began the 2005–2006 regular season playing in the AHL for the Hamilton Bulldogs. He played 26 games, scoring a total of one goal and one assist while racking up 46 PIMs. His perseverance eventually convinced Habs GM Bob Gainey to call Murray up to fill in for injuries, and he would stay there for the rest of the season. He scored only five goals and six points in his 36 games as a Hab, along with 44 PIMs, but impressed the team and fans by his tireless work ethic and tough-as-nails style of play. Many fans believe his success caused Niklas Sundström to be removed from the Canadiens' future plans, taking his spot on the fourth line alongside Steve Bégin and Radek Bonk. Murray began the 2006–2007 season on the Canadiens' starting line-up but eventually lost his spot to the likes of Maxim Lapierre. On November 12, 2007, Murray was placed on waivers by the Canadiens and was claimed by the Florida Panthers. On July 18, 2008, Murray was signed to a one-year contract by the Phoenix Coyotes.

On October 6, 2011, Murray was signed to a try-out contract with the St. John's IceCaps of the AHL. After establishing a role within the IceCaps to start the 2011–12 season, Murray was signed to a year-long contract on December 6, 2011. In his final professional season before retirement he finished the season as the IceCaps leader in penalty minutes and was awarded as the first ever winner of the fans choice award.

== Career statistics ==
=== Regular season and playoffs ===
			Regular season					Playoffs
Season	Team	League	GP	G	A	Pts	PIM	GP	G	A	Pts	PIM
1997–98	Regina Pats	WHL	4	0	0	0	2	2	0	0	0	0
1998–99	Regina Pats	WHL	60	3	5	8	101	—	—	—	—	—
1999–2000	Regina Pats	WHL	68	14	26	40	155	7	1	1	2	7
2000–01	Regina Pats	WHL	72	28	16	44	183	6	1	1	2	10
2001–02	Regina Pats	WHL	62	33	30	63	154	6	2	3	5	9
2001–02	Hartford Wolf Pack	AHL	4	0	0	0	0	9	1	3	4	6
2002–03	Hartford Wolf Pack	AHL	64	10	14	24	121	2	0	0	0	6
2003–04	Hartford Wolf Pack	AHL	63	11	11	22	159	16	0	4	4	29
2003–04	New York Rangers	NHL	20	1	0	1	24	—	—	—	—	—
2004–05	Hartford Wolf Pack	AHL	55	4	5	9	182	5	1	0	1	8
2005–06	Hamilton Bulldogs	AHL	26	1	1	2	46	—	—	—	—	—
2005–06	Montreal Canadiens	NHL	36	5	1	6	44	6	0	0	0	0
2006–07	Montreal Canadiens	NHL	43	2	1	3	32	—	—	—	—	—
2007–08	Montreal Canadiens	NHL	1	0	0	0	0	—	—	—	—	—
2007–08	Florida Panthers	NHL	6	0	0	0	19	—	—	—	—	—
2008–09	San Antonio Rampage	AHL	64	11	10	21	146	—	—	—	—	—
2008–09	Phoenix Coyotes	NHL	10	0	0	0	12	—	—	—	—	—
2009–10	Abbotsford Heat	AHL	80	9	22	31	169	13	1	2	3	34
2010–11	Victoria Salmon Kings	ECHL	8	2	1	3	23	—	—	—	—	—
2010–11	Manitoba Moose	AHL	55	6	5	11	90	13	0	1	1	42
2011–12	St. John's IceCaps	AHL	62	3	10	13	112	15	1	3	4	29
AHL totals			473	55	78	133	1025	73	4	13	17	154
NHL totals			116	8	2	10	131	6	0	0	0	0

Medal record

Representing Canada

Ice hockey

World Junior Championships
Silver medal – second place	2002 Pardubice	

=== International ===
Year	Team	Event	Result	GP	G	A	Pts	PIM
2002	Canada	WJC	2nd place, silver medalist(s)	7	3	3	6	12
Junior totals				7	3	3	6	12

== Transactions ==
- Traded to Montreal by New York Rangers for Marcel Hossa, September 30, 2005.
- Claimed off waivers by Florida from Montreal, November 13, 2007.
- Signed as a free agent by Phoenix, July 18, 2008.
- Signed as a free agent by Calgary, July 1, 2009.
