= Brian Sutherby =

Canadian ice hockey player and scout

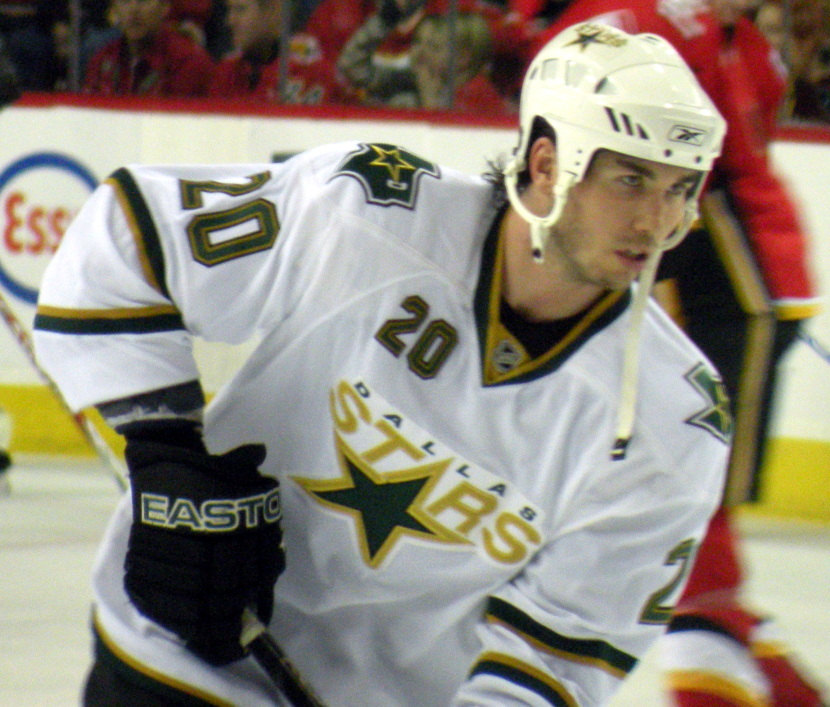
- Sutherby in 2009
- Born: March 14, 1982 (age 44) Edmonton, Alberta, Canada
- Height: 6 ft 3 in (191 cm)
- Weight: 209 lb (95 kg; 14 st 13 lb)
- Position: Centre
- Shot: Left
- Played for: Washington Capitals; Anaheim Ducks; Dallas Stars
- NHL draft: 26th overall, 2000; Washington Capitals
- Playing career: 2001–2013

Brian Sutherby (born March 1, 1982) is a Canadian former professional ice hockey centre who is currently a scout for the Washington Capitals. He played in the National Hockey League with the Washington Capitals, Anaheim Ducks and the Dallas Stars.

== Playing career ==
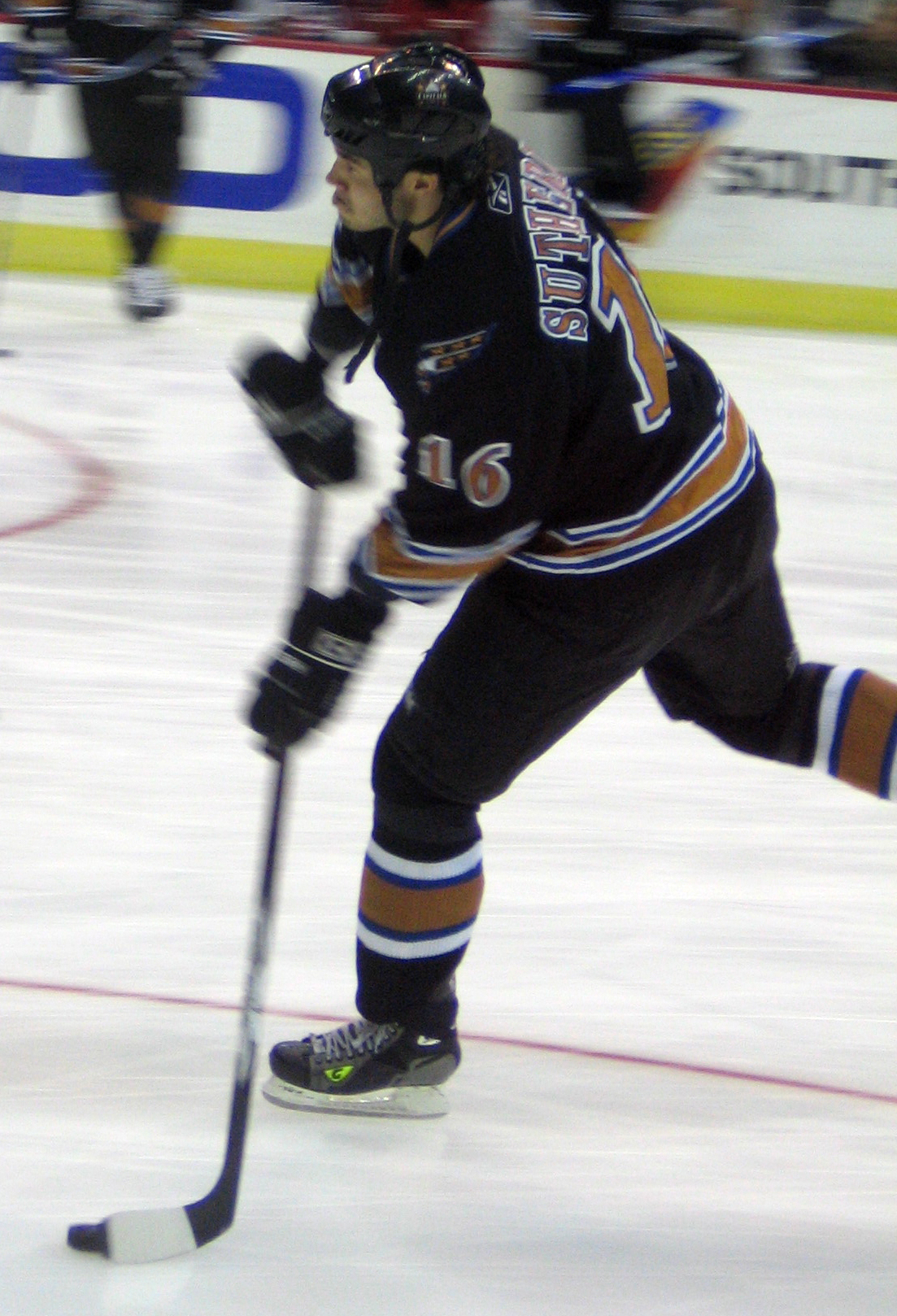
Sutherby with the Capitals

Sutherby was drafted in the 1st round, 26th overall by the Washington Capitals in the 2000 NHL entry draft from the Moose Jaw Warriors of the Western Hockey League. After signing a three-year entry level with the Capitals on the eve of the 2001–02 season, Sutherby made his NHL debut in the season opener before he was reassigned after 7 games to the Warriors to complete his junior career. In his first full professional season with the Capitals in the 2002–03 season. Sutherby was selected and played in the 2003 NHL YoungStars Game, winning the game's MVP award.

On November 19, 2007 he was traded to the Anaheim Ducks in exchange for a second round pick in the 2009 NHL Entry Draft. In the following 2008–09 season on December 14, 2008 Sutherby was again on the move after he was traded by the Ducks to the Dallas Stars for David McIntyre and a conditional 6th round draft pick. On March 9, 2009, Sutherby was re-signed by the Stars to a two-year contract.

On October 21, 2011, Sutherby was given a professional try-out from the San Antonio Rampage of the AHL. After scoring 1 goal in 15 games with the Rampage early in the 2011–12 season, Sutherby did not sign to an extended contract upon completion of his try-out on December 10, 2011. He missed the remainder of the season recovering from back surgery to repair a herniated disc.

With the impending 2012 NHL lockout affecting any chance of a return to the NHL, Sutherby opted to attend the AHL team St. John's IceCaps' training camp on a try-out contract. He was then released to be among the last cuts of the IceCaps opening night roster for the 2012–13 season. Upon the midpoint of the season, Sutherby was signed to an AHL contract for the remainder of the season with the Lake Erie Monsters on January 4, 2012. Sutherby's experience made an immediate impact and after only 9 games he was named as the Monsters captain, as a replacement for former captain Bryan Lerg's season-ending injury.

At the conclusion of his professional career, Sutherby accepted a position within the Washington Capitals as a western pro scout, residing in Southern California.

== Career statistics ==
=== Regular season and playoffs ===
| | | | Regular season | | | | | Playoffs |
| Season | Team | League | GP | G | A | Pts | PIM | GP | G | A | Pts | PIM |
|---|---|---|---|---|---|---|---|---|---|---|---|---|
| 1998–99 | Moose Jaw Warriors | WHL | 66 | 9 | 12 | 21 | 47 | 11 | 0 | 1 | 1 | 0 |
| 1999–2000 | Moose Jaw Warriors | WHL | 47 | 18 | 17 | 35 | 102 | 4 | 1 | 1 | 2 | 12 |
| 2000–01 | Moose Jaw Warriors | WHL | 59 | 34 | 43 | 77 | 138 | 4 | 2 | 1 | 3 | 10 |
| 2000–01 | Portland Pirates | AHL | 2 | 0 | 0 | 0 | 2 | 2 | 0 | 0 | 0 | 0 |
| 2001–02 | Washington Capitals | NHL | 7 | 0 | 0 | 0 | 2 | — | — | — | — | — |
| 2001–02 | Moose Jaw Warriors | WHL | 36 | 18 | 27 | 45 | 75 | 12 | 7 | 5 | 12 | 33 |
| 2002–03 | Portland Pirates | AHL | 5 | 0 | 5 | 5 | 11 | — | — | — | — | — |
| 2002–03 | Washington Capitals | NHL | 72 | 2 | 9 | 11 | 93 | 5 | 0 | 0 | 0 | 10 |
| 2003–04 | Portland Pirates | AHL | 6 | 2 | 4 | 6 | 16 | — | — | — | — | — |
| 2003–04 | Washington Capitals | NHL | 30 | 2 | 0 | 2 | 28 | — | — | — | — | — |
| 2004–05 | Portland Pirates | AHL | 53 | 10 | 19 | 29 | 115 | — | — | — | — | — |
| 2005–06 | Washington Capitals | NHL | 76 | 14 | 16 | 30 | 73 | — | — | — | — | — |
| 2006–07 | Washington Capitals | NHL | 69 | 7 | 10 | 17 | 78 | — | — | — | — | — |
| 2007–08 | Washington Capitals | NHL | 5 | 1 | 0 | 1 | 7 | — | — | — | — | — |
| 2007–08 | Anaheim Ducks | NHL | 45 | 0 | 1 | 1 | 57 | 5 | 0 | 0 | 0 | 2 |
| 2008–09 | Anaheim Ducks | NHL | 17 | 3 | 3 | 6 | 19 | — | — | — | — | — |
| 2008–09 | Dallas Stars | NHL | 42 | 5 | 4 | 9 | 52 | — | — | — | — | — |
| 2009–10 | Dallas Stars | NHL | 46 | 5 | 4 | 9 | 66 | — | — | — | — | — |
| 2010–11 | Dallas Stars | NHL | 51 | 2 | 2 | 4 | 58 | — | — | — | — | — |
| 2011–12 | San Antonio Rampage | AHL | 15 | 1 | 3 | 4 | 18 | — | — | — | — | — |
| 2012–13 | Lake Erie Monsters | AHL | 25 | 1 | 1 | 2 | 35 | — | — | — | — | — |
| NHL totals | | | 460 | 41 | 49 | 90 | 533 | 10 | 0 | 0 | 0 | 12 |

Medal record

Representing Canada

Ice hockey

World Junior Championships
| Silver medal – second place | 2002 Pardubice | |

=== International ===
| Year | Team | Event | Result | GP | G | A | Pts | PIM |
|---|---|---|---|---|---|---|---|---|
| 2002 | Canada | WJC | 2nd place, silver medalist(s) | 7 | 3 | 3 | 6 | 2 |
| Junior totals | | | | 7 | 3 | 3 | 6 | 2 |

== Awards and honours ==
| Award | Year |
|---|---|
NHL
| NHL YoungStars Game MVP | 2003 |

Awards and achievements
| Preceded by Kris Beech | Washington Capitals first-round draft pick 2000 | Succeeded by Steve Eminger |
