= Marek Svatoš =

Slovak ice hockey player

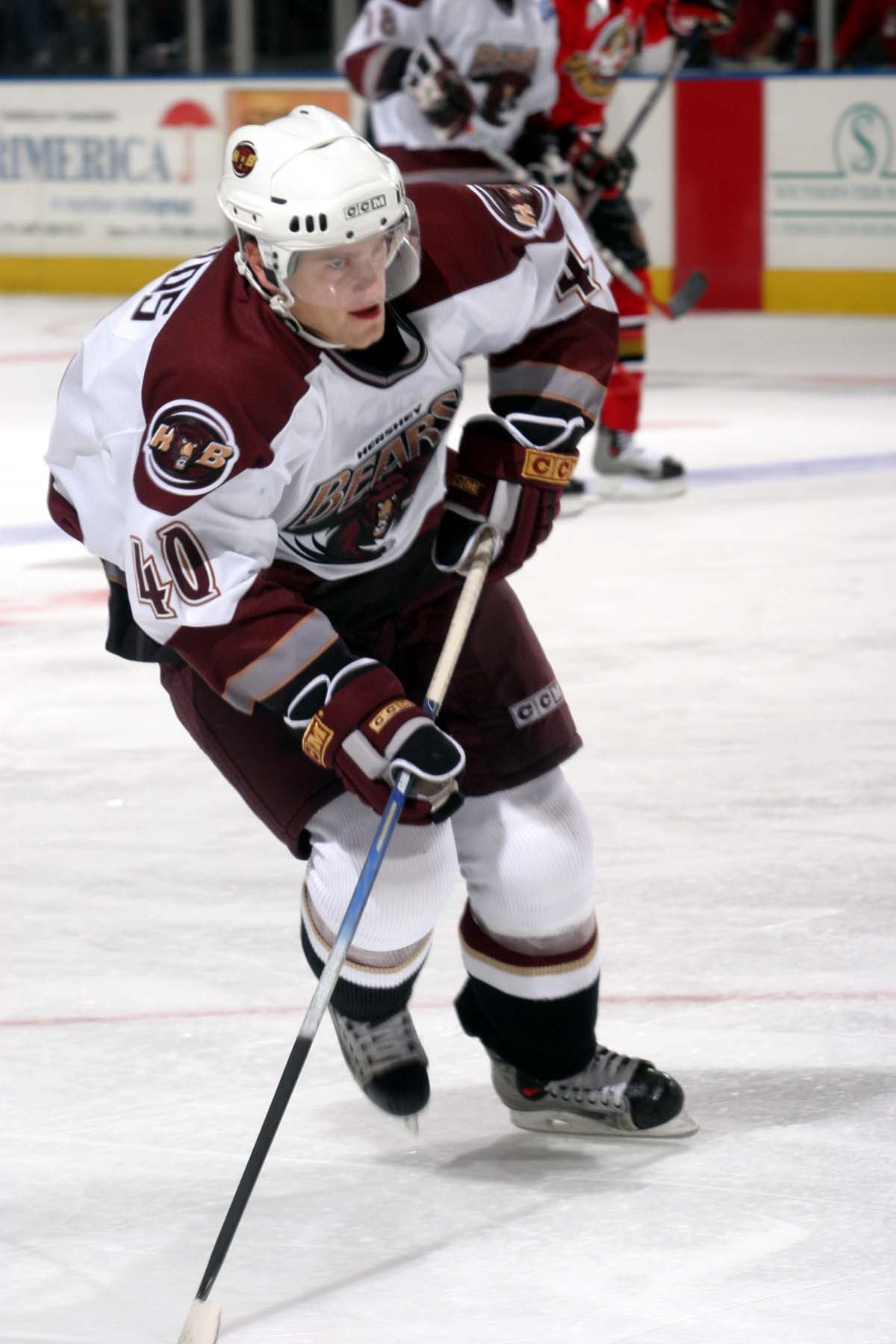
- Svatoš with the Hershey Bears in 2004
- Born: 17 June 1982 Košice, Czechoslovakia
- Died: 4 November 2016 (aged 34) Lone Tree, Colorado, U.S.
- Height: 5 ft 10 in (178 cm)
- Weight: 185 lb (84 kg; 13 st 3 lb)
- Position: Right wing
- Shot: Right
- Played for: Košice; Colorado Avalanche; Avangard Omsk; Nashville Predators; Ottawa Senators; Slovan Bratislava
- National team: Slovakia
- NHL draft: 227th overall, 2001; Colorado Avalanche
- Playing career: 2002–2014

Marek Svatoš (17 June 1982 – 4 November 2016) was a Slovak professional ice hockey winger. He last played during the 2013–14 season in the Slovak Extraliga with Košice, the same club with which he began his career in 1999. Svatoš played in the National Hockey League (NHL) for several seasons, mostly with the Colorado Avalanche; his last stint in the NHL was in the 2010–11 season, during which he played with the Nashville Predators and Ottawa Senators after beginning the season in the Kontinental Hockey League (KHL) with Avangard Omsk.

== Playing career ==
Svatoš was drafted 227th overall by the Colorado Avalanche in the 2001 NHL entry draft. He played his first NHL games for the Avalanche in the 2003–04 season. Following a strong performance in the Avalanche's second-round loss in the playoffs, he returned to the Avalanche's AHL affiliate, the Hershey Bears, during the 2004 NHL lockout. Svatoš recorded his first career hat trick in the NHL against the Calgary Flames in a 7–3 win on 10 October 2005. He was chosen to play in the 2006 Winter Olympics in Turin, Italy, as part of the Slovak national team.

On 9 March 2006, it was announced that Svatoš sustained a fracture to his right shoulder that forced him to miss the rest of the 2005–06 season. At the time of his injury, Svatoš led the NHL in game-winning goals with nine, which tied an NHL record for game-winning goals by a rookie. He was also one of the top rookie scorers with 32 goals in 61 games.

Svatoš' numbers dropped in 2006–07, his second season, as he recorded 15 goals and 15 assists in 66 games while suffering a recurring groin injury throughout the season.

Svatoš was leading the Avalanche with 26 goals during the 2007–08 campaign when he suffered a torn ACL in a game against the Los Angeles Kings on 1 March 2008. Svatoš missed the final sixteen games of the season and the additional playoff series, but still placed second in goals on the team.

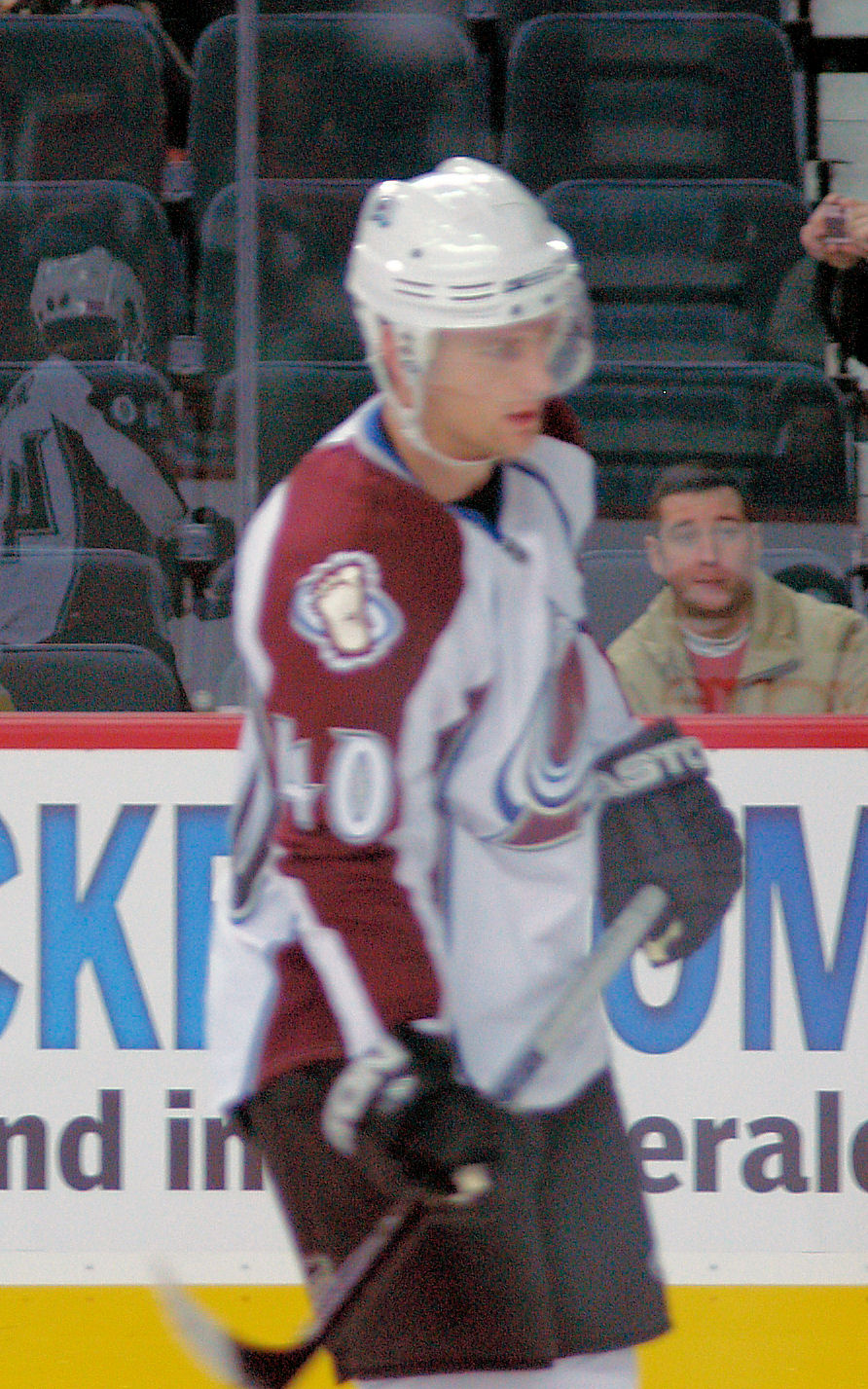
Svatoš with the Colorado Avalanche in 2007.

On 25 July 2008, Svatoš re-signed with the Avalanche for a further two years, avoiding arbitration scheduled on the same day. He managed to return to the opening night roster for the 2008–09 season, recovering from his ACL tear gradually as the season went on. He played in 69 games with the Avalanche before injuring his hand on 7 April 2009, in a 0–1 overtime loss against the San Jose Sharks in San Jose, ending his play with three games left in the season. His 14 goals tied Wojtek Wolski for fourth on the Western Conference last-placed Avalanche.

In the 2009–10 season, Svatoš was limited to 54 games, again missing 18 games through groin and chest injuries. With a sixth consecutive NHL season affected by injury, he suffered from a loss of form, and under new coach Joe Sacco was relegated to a reserve role and recorded a career-low 7 goals and 11 points.

Without a contract offer, Svatoš left the NHL and signed a one-year contract during the early stages of the 2010–11 European season with Russian team Avangard Omsk of the KHL, on 24 September 2010. In 19 games with Omsk, he posted 3 goals and 8 points before he was granted a release, after both sides agreed to terminate the deal on 23 December 2010.

On 28 December 2010, Svatoš returned to North America with NHL ambitions, signing a one-year, two-way contract with the St. Louis Blues. However, in order to return to the NHL he was placed on waivers due to starting the season in Europe and the following day on 29 December, was subsequently claimed by the Nashville Predators. On 31 December 2010, he dressed for the Predators to make his 2010–11 season debut in an away game win over the Minnesota Wild. In his fourth game, Svatos registered his only goal for the Predators in a 5–2 victory over the Los Angeles Kings on 6 January 2011. Leading up to the trade deadline, Svatos was waived by the Predators after nine games and was subsequently claimed by the Ottawa Senators on 24 February 2011. Svatos earned a regular shift with the Senators and on 27 March 2011, he scored his second goal of the game, which marked his 100th career NHL goal, in a defeat by the Atlanta Thrashers. Svatos appeared in 19 games for the Senators before he suffered a season ending concussion as a result of a check from Jay Rosehill in a late season contest against the Toronto Maple Leafs.

After sitting out the entire 2011–12 season recovering from injury, Svatoš signed a try-out contract to attend the Florida Panthers' training camp for the 2012–13 season, following a resolution to the NHL lockout on 7 January 2013. Upon completion of the abbreviated training camp, Svatoš was released two days prior to the regular season on 17 January 2013.

Shortly after leaving Panthers camp, Svatoš signed with KHL team Slovan Bratislava in his home country for the remainder of the 2012–13 season on 22 January 2013.

Svatoš opted to remain in Slovakia the following season. As a free agent, he signed a one-year contract with Košice of the Slovak Extraliga on 18 September 2013. He helped his hometown club win their seventh league title in the final season of his hockey career.

== Death ==
Svatoš died on 4 November 2016 at his home in Lone Tree, Colorado at the age of 34. He was survived by his wife, Diana, and two children.

It was revealed on 5 December 2016 that Svatoš' death was due to mixed drug intoxication. His wife later revealed that Svatoš had been suffering from Stage 2 chronic traumatic encephalopathy at the time of his death.

== Career statistics ==
=== Regular season and playoffs ===
| | | | Regular season | | | | | Playoffs |
| Season | Team | League | GP | G | A | Pts | PIM | GP | G | A | Pts | PIM |
|---|---|---|---|---|---|---|---|---|---|---|---|---|
| 1999–2000 | HC VSŽ Košice | SVK U20 | 39 | 43 | 30 | 73 | 28 | — | — | — | — | — |
| 1999–2000 | HC VSŽ Košice | SVK | 19 | 2 | 2 | 4 | 0 | — | — | — | — | — |
| 2000–01 | Kootenay Ice | WHL | 39 | 23 | 18 | 41 | 47 | 11 | 7 | 2 | 9 | 26 |
| 2001–02 | Kootenay Ice | WHL | 53 | 38 | 39 | 77 | 58 | 21 | 12 | 6 | 18 | 40 |
| 2001–02 | Kootenay Ice | MC | — | — | — | — | — | 4 | 1 | 4 | 5 | 4 |
| 2002–03 | Hershey Bears | AHL | 30 | 9 | 4 | 13 | 10 | — | — | — | — | — |
| 2003–04 | Colorado Avalanche | NHL | 4 | 2 | 0 | 2 | 0 | 11 | 1 | 5 | 6 | 2 |
| 2004–05 | Hershey Bears | AHL | 72 | 18 | 28 | 46 | 69 | — | — | — | — | — |
| 2005–06 | Colorado Avalanche | NHL | 61 | 32 | 18 | 50 | 46 | — | — | — | — | — |
| 2006–07 | Colorado Avalanche | NHL | 66 | 15 | 15 | 30 | 46 | — | — | — | — | — |
| 2007–08 | Colorado Avalanche | NHL | 62 | 26 | 11 | 37 | 32 | — | — | — | — | — |
| 2008–09 | Colorado Avalanche | NHL | 69 | 14 | 20 | 34 | 34 | — | — | — | — | — |
| 2009–10 | Colorado Avalanche | NHL | 54 | 7 | 4 | 11 | 35 | 3 | 1 | 0 | 1 | 2 |
| 2010–11 | Avangard Omsk | KHL | 19 | 3 | 5 | 8 | 14 | — | — | — | — | — |
| 2010–11 | Nashville Predators | NHL | 9 | 1 | 2 | 3 | 2 | — | — | — | — | — |
| 2010–11 | Ottawa Senators | NHL | 19 | 3 | 2 | 5 | 8 | — | — | — | — | — |
| 2012–13 | HC Slovan Bratislava | KHL | 6 | 1 | 0 | 1 | 4 | 2 | 0 | 0 | 0 | 2 |
| 2013–14 | HC Košice | SVK | 26 | 6 | 13 | 19 | 10 | 10 | 1 | 3 | 4 | 4 |
| NHL totals | | | 344 | 100 | 72 | 172 | 217 | 14 | 2 | 5 | 7 | 4 |

=== International ===
| Year | Team | Event | Result | GP | G | A | Pts | PIM |
|---|---|---|---|---|---|---|---|---|
| 2000 | Slovakia | WJC18 | 5th | 6 | 2 | 0 | 2 | 0 |
| 2002 | Slovakia | WJC | 8th | 7 | 7 | 1 | 8 | 6 |
| 2006 | Slovakia | OG | 5th | 6 | 0 | 0 | 0 | 0 |
| 2010 | Slovakia | WC | 12th | 6 | 1 | 1 | 2 | 6 |
| Junior totals | | | | 13 | 9 | 1 | 10 | 6 |
| Senior totals | | | | 12 | 1 | 1 | 2 | 6 |

== Awards and honours ==
| Award | Year |
|---|---|
Western Hockey League
| All-Rookie Team | 2000–01 |
| WHL Champion | 2001–02 |
| West Second All-Star Team | 2001–02 |
Canadian Hockey League
| CHL Memorial Cup Champion | 2002 |
Slovak Extraliga
| Slovak Extraliga Champion | 2013-14 |
