= Igor Grigorenko =

Russian ice hockey player (born 1983)

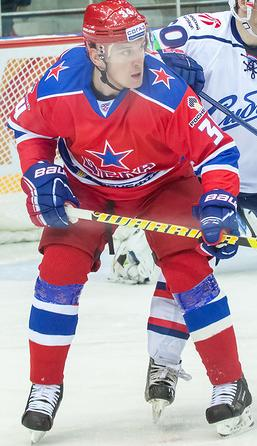
- Born: April 9, 1983 (age 43) Togliatti, Russian SFSR, Soviet Union
- Height: 5 ft 10 in (178 cm)
- Weight: 209 lb (95 kg; 14 st 13 lb)
- Position: Right wing
- Shot: Left
- Played for: Lada Togliatti; Salavat Yulaev Ufa; Severstal Cherepovets; Grand Rapids Griffins; CSKA Moscow; Metallurg Magnitogorsk
- National team: Russia
- NHL draft: 62nd overall, 2001; Detroit Red Wings
- Playing career: 2001–2018

Igor Grigorenko (born April 9, 1983) is a Russian former professional ice hockey right winger who played almost exclusively in the Kontinental Hockey League (KHL). He currently serves as the general director of Dinamo-Samara.

== Playing career ==
In 2001, Grigorenko was a member of the Russian World U-18 team. At the tournament he finished second overall in the tournament scoring and was also named to the tournament's first All Star team, he was drafted 62nd overall in the 2001 NHL entry draft by the Detroit Red Wings.

In 2002–03, Grigorenko was the leading scorer with Lada in the Russian Super League with 19 goals and 29 points in 47 regular season games. His 19 goals were also among the top three goal scorers in the league.

Grigorenko helped Russia win the gold at the 2003 World Junior Ice Hockey Championships and earned championship game MVP honors.

His success with Lada gave him the opportunity to make his debut with the Russian senior national team. Grigorenko posted 7 goals and 8 points in 17 games with the team, including 2 goals and an assist in 7 games at the 2003 Men's World Ice Hockey Championships.

On May 16, 2003, Grigorenko was involved in a serious car accident. He suffered a broken left thigh bone and two fractures in his left shin bone. In addition, complications arose and he developed a fat embolism in his left lung, which is a potentially fatal condition.

Mark Lapush, Grigorenko's agent, said, "They gave him a 10-percent chance to be alive, and he made it. He’s feeling good. He said, 'Mark, trust me, I’m going to play hockey. I’m going to play for Detroit.'"

He signed a one-year, entry-level contract with the Detroit Red Wings in May, 2007, but was unable to make the team out of training camp. After 5 games in the American Hockey League with affiliate the Grand Rapids Griffins, Grigorenko returned to Russia.

During the 2012–13 season, after scoring 5 points in 12 games, Grigorenko was traded from to Salavat Yulaev Ufa to CSKA Moscow in exchange for Denis Parshin on October 10, 2012.

Following the 2017–18 season with Metallurg Magnitogorsk, his 17th professional campaign, Grigorenko announced his retirement on June 7, 2018.

== Career statistics ==
=== Regular season and playoffs ===
			Regular season					Playoffs
Season	Team	League	GP	G	A	Pts	PIM	GP	G	A	Pts	PIM
1998–99	Lada–2 Togliatti	RUS.3	19	3	3	6	2	—	—	—	—	—
1999–2000	Lada–2 Togliatti	RUS.3	38	17	17	34	36	—	—	—	—	—
2000–01	CSK VVS Samara	RUS.2	39	10	10	20	88	—	—	—	—	—
2000–01	Lada–2 Togliatti	RUS.3	5	4	1	5	4	—	—	—	—	—
2000–01	Lada Togliatti	RSL	—	—	—	—	—	5	1	0	1	4
2001–02	Lada Togliatti	RSL	42	8	9	17	58	4	1	0	1	8
2001–02	Lada–2 Togliatti	RUS.3	11	12	11	23	11	—	—	—	—	—
2002–03	Lada Togliatti	RSL	47	19	11	30	82	10	1	6	7	10
2003–04	Lada–2 Togliatti	RUS.3	8	2	3	5	0	—	—	—	—	—
2003–04	Lada Togliatti	RSL	—	—	—	—	—	3	0	0	0	0
2004–05	Lada Togliatti	RSL	11	0	1	1	6	—	—	—	—	—
2004–05	Lada–2 Togliatti	RUS.3	7	5	5	10	8	—	—	—	—	—
2004–05	Salavat Yulaev Ufa	RSL	30	11	7	18	22	—	—	—	—	—
2004–05	Salavat Yulaev–2 Ufa	RUS.3	1	0	2	2	0	—	—	—	—	—
2005–06	Severstal Cherepovets	RSL	50	13	20	33	26	4	1	1	2	8
2006–07	Lada Togliatti	RSL	49	14	13	27	71	2	2	1	3	2
2007–08	Grand Rapids Griffins	AHL	5	0	0	0	4	—	—	—	—	—
2007–08	Salavat Yulaev Ufa	RSL	27	4	6	10	24	5	0	1	1	0
2008–09	Salavat Yulaev Ufa	KHL	36	2	8	10	10	1	0	1	1	2
2008–09	Salavat Yulaev–2 Ufa	RUS.3	1	1	0	1	0	—	—	—	—	—
2009–10	Salavat Yulaev Ufa	KHL	55	22	14	36	40	15	5	4	9	8
2010–11	Salavat Yulaev Ufa	KHL	44	24	16	40	30	21	9	6	15	6
2011–12	Salavat Yulaev Ufa	KHL	44	19	15	34	29	6	1	0	1	4
2012–13	Salavat Yulaev Ufa	KHL	12	1	4	5	18	—	—	—	—	—
2012–13	CSKA Moscow	KHL	27	4	2	6	20	9	2	0	2	2
2013–14	CSKA Moscow	KHL	54	13	14	27	60	4	1	1	2	2
2014–15	CSKA Moscow	KHL	55	23	22	45	44	14	10	9	19	8
2015–16	Salavat Yulaev Ufa	KHL	55	18	26	44	30	18	6	3	9	12
2016–17	Salavat Yulaev Ufa	KHL	32	6	3	9	20	5	0	1	1	16
2017–18	Metallurg Magnitogorsk	KHL	19	2	3	5	6	—	—	—	—	—
RUS.3 totals			90	44	42	86	61	—	—	—	—	—
RSL totals			256	69	67	136	289	33	6	9	15	32
KHL totals			433	134	127	261	307	93	34	25	59	60

=== International ===
Medal record

Representing Russia

Ice hockey

World Junior Championships
Gold medal – first place	2002 Pardubice	
Gold medal – first place	2003 Nova Scotia	

IIHF U18 Championships
Gold medal – first place	2001 Helsinki	

Year	Team	Event	Result	GP	G	A	Pts	PIM
2001	Russia	WJC18	1st place, gold medalist(s)	6	6	4	10	8
2002	Russia	WJC	1st place, gold medalist(s)	7	1	2	3	4
2003	Russia	WJC	1st place, gold medalist(s)	6	6	4	10	4
2003	Russia	WC	5th	7	2	1	3	16
2006	Russia	WC	5th	7	1	2	3	8
Junior totals				19	13	10	23	16
Senior totals				14	3	3	6	24
