= 2002 World Junior Ice Hockey Championships =

2002 IIHF World U20 Championship

Tournament details
- Host country: Czech Republic
- Venues: 2 (in 2 host cities)
- Dates: December 25, 2001 – January 4, 2002
- Teams: 10

Final positions
- Champions: Russia (2nd title)
- Runners-up: Canada
- Third place: Finland
- Fourth place: Switzerland

Tournament statistics
- Games played: 34
- Goals scored: 201 (5.91 per game)
- Attendance: 111,128 (3,268 per game)
- Scoring leader: (Canada) Mike Cammalleri (11 points)

The 2002 IIHF World U20 Championship, commonly referred as the 2002 World Junior Hockey Championships (2002 WJHC), was the 26th edition of the Ice Hockey World Junior Championship. The tournament was held in Pardubice and Hradec Králové, Czech Republic, from December 25, 2001 to January 4, 2002.

Russia won the gold medal with a 5–4 come-from-behind victory over Canada in the championship game, while Finland won the bronze medal with a 5–1 victory over Switzerland.

== Venues ==
ČEZ Aréna Capacity: 10,194	Zimní Stadion Capacity: 7,700
Czech Republic – Pardubice	Czech Republic – Hradec Králové

== Top Division ==
=== Preliminary round ===
==== Group A ====
Pos	Team	Pld	W	D	L	GF	GA	GD	Pts	Qualification
1	Slovakia	4	2	2	0	14	7	+7	6	Quarterfinals
2	United States	4	2	2	0	14	9	+5	6	Quarterfinals
3	Sweden	4	2	2	0	11	5	+6	6	Quarterfinals
4	Czech Republic	4	1	0	3	11	7	+4	2	Quarterfinals
5	Belarus	4	0	0	4	4	26	−22	0	Relegation round

Source: IIHF.com at the Wayback Machine

All times local (CET/UTC+1).

December 25, 2001; 14:00	United States	3–1 (2–0, 1–1, 0–0)	Czech Republic	Pardubice; Attendance: 8,500

December 25, 2001; 17:30	Belarus	0–5 (0–2, 0–1, 0–2)	Sweden	Pardubice; Attendance: 3,800

December 26, 2001; 17:00	Slovakia	7–1 (1–0, 4–1, 2–0)	Belarus	Pardubice; Attendance: 2,780

December 27, 2001; 17:30	Czech Republic	0–1 (0–0, 0–1, 0–0)	Slovakia	Pardubice; Attendance: 9,170

December 27, 2001; 20:15	Sweden	2–2 (0–0, 0–2, 2–0)	United States	Pardubice; Attendance: 6,300

December 28, 2001; 17:00	Belarus	1–9 (1–3, 0–1, 0–5)	Czech Republic	Pardubice; Attendance: 6,715

December 29, 2001; 15:30	Sweden	2–2 (0–1, 0–0, 2–1)	Slovakia	Pardubice; Attendance: 3,093

December 29, 2001; 19:00	United States	5–2 (0–1, 2–1, 3–0)	Belarus	Pardubice; Attendance: 1,275

December 30, 2001; 14:00	Czech Republic	1–2 (1–0, 0–1, 0–1)	Sweden	Pardubice; Attendance: 9,300

December 30, 2001; 17:00	Slovakia	4–4 (2–3, 1–0, 1–1)	United States	Pardubice; Attendance: 7,530

==== Group B ====
Pos	Team	Pld	W	D	L	GF	GA	GD	Pts	Qualification
1	Finland	4	3	0	1	14	5	+9	6	Quarterfinals
2	Canada	4	3	0	1	27	7	+20	6	Quarterfinals
3	Russia	4	2	0	2	12	8	+4	4	Quarterfinals
4	Switzerland	4	2	0	2	12	10	+2	4	Quarterfinals
5	France	4	0	0	4	1	36	−35	0	Relegation round

Source: IIHF.com at the Wayback Machine

All times local (CET/UTC+1).

December 25, 2001; 15:300	France	0–15 (0–4, 0–5, 0–6)	Canada	Hradec Králové; Attendance: 300

December 25, 2001; 19:00	Switzerland	3–0 (1–0, 0–0, 2–0)	Finland	Hradec Králové; Attendance: 462

December 26, 2001; 17:00	Russia	5–1 (1–0, 3–0, 1–1)	France	Hradec Králové; Attendance: 302

December 27, 2001; 15:30	Canada	6–1 (2–1, 1–0, 3–0)	Switzerland	Hradec Králové; Attendance: 1,800

December 27, 2001; 19:00	Finland	2–1 (0–0, 0–1, 2–0)	Russia	Hradec Králové; Attendance: 2,200

December 28, 2001; 17:00	France	0–8 (0–3, 0–3, 0–2)	Finland	Hradec Králové; Attendance: 300

December 29, 2001; 15:30	Canada	5–2 (2–0, 1–2, 2–0)	Russia	Hradec Králové; Attendance: 4,600

December 29, 2001; 19:00	Switzerland	8–0 (3–0, 4–0, 1–0)	France	Hradec Králové; Attendance: 856

December 30, 2001; 15:30	Russia	4–0 (2–0, 0–0, 2–0)	Switzerland	Hradec Králové; Attendance: 850

December 30, 2001; 19:00	Finland	4–1 (2–1, 0–0, 2–0)	Canada	Hradec Králové; Attendance: 3,500

=== Relegation round ===
January 1, 2002; 11:00	Belarus	2–3 (1–0, 0–2, 1–1)	France	Hradec Králové; Attendance: 300

Game reference

January 3, 2002; 17:00	France	2–4 GWS (0–2, 2–1, 0–0, 0–0, 0–1)	Belarus	Pardubice

Game reference

France was relegated to Division I for the 2003 World Junior Ice Hockey Championships.

=== Final round ===
Quarterfinals
A2	United States	1
B3	Russia	6
B1	Finland	3
A4	Czech Republic	1
A1	Slovakia	2
B4	Switzerland	3^{‡}
B2	Canada	5
A3	Sweden	2

Semifinals
B3	Russia	2^{†}
B1	Finland	1
B4	Switzerland	0
B2	Canada	4

Gold medal game
B3	Russia	5
B2	Canada	4
Bronze medal game
B1	Finland	5
B4	Switzerland	1

† Overtime victory. ‡ Shootout victory.

==== Quarterfinals ====
January 1, 2002; 14:30	United States	1–6 (0–1, 1–4, 0–1)	Russia	Hradec Králové; Attendance: 1,500

January 1, 2002; 14:30	Slovakia	2–3 GWS (0–0, 1–1, 1–0, 0–0, 0–1)	Switzerland	Pardubice; Attendance: 3,200

January 1, 2002; 18:00	Canada	5–2 (2–2, 2–0, 1–0)	Sweden	Hradec Králové; Attendance: 1,200

Pascal Leclaire
Goalies
Henrik Lundqvist

	0-1	15:30 - Lundqvist
	0-2	16:06 - Hedlund (Sundqvist) (PP)
Cammalleri (Boyes, Hamhuis) - 16:29	1-2
Stoll (Sutherby, Ott) - 18:59	2-2
Boyes (Bouwmeester (PP) - 30:36	3-2
Murray (Upshall) - 34:56	4-2
Sutherby (Stoll) (SH-EN) - 59:02	5-2

28
Shots
40

January 1, 2002; 18:00	Finland	3–1 (1–0, 1–1, 1–0)	Czech Republic	Pardubice; Attendance: 5,725

==== Consolation round ====
January 2, 2002; 15:30	Slovakia	2–3 (2–0, 0–0, 0–3)	Sweden	Hradec Králové; Attendance: 400

January 2, 2002; 19:00	Czech Republic	3–4 (2–1, 0–2, 1–1)	United States	Hradec Králové; Attendance: 1,700

==== Semifinals ====
January 2, 2002; 17:00	Switzerland	0–4 (0–0, 0–3, 0–1)	Canada	Pardubice; Attendance: 2,270

Tobias Stephan
Goalies
Pascal Leclaire

0-1	26:04 - Ott (Stoll)
0-2	32:27 - Cammalleri (Sutherby)
0-3	33:35 - Sutherby (Ott)
0-4	58:28 - Ott (Schultz, Popovic)

35
Shots
40

January 2, 2002; 20:30	Russia	2–1 OT (1–1, 0–0, 0–0, 1–0)	Finland	Pardubice; Attendance: 2,820

==== 7th place game ====
January 4, 2002; 15:30	Slovakia	2–6 (0–1, 1–3, 1–2)	Czech Republic	Hradec Králové; Attendance: 1,220

==== 5th place game ====
January 4, 2002; 19:00	United States	3–2 OT (1–0, 1–0, 0–2, 1–0)	Sweden	Hradec Králové; Attendance: 300

==== Bronze medal game ====
January 4, 2002; 16:30	(bronze) Finland	5–1 (3–0, 2–1, 0–0)	Switzerland	Pardubice; Attendance: 7,430

==== Gold medal game ====
January 4, 2002; 20:30	(gold) Russia	5–4 (1–2, 3–1, 1–1)	Canada (silver)	Pardubice; Attendance: 9,130

	0–1	0:22 – Sutherby (Stoll)
	0–2	7:12 – Kobasew (Murray)
Frolov (Polushin) – 7:44	1–2
	1–3	20:37 – Upshall (Spezza)
Chistov (Volchenkov) – 25:16	2–3
Polushin – 31:32	3–3
Trubachyov (Grogorenko) – 33:15	4–3
	4–4	44:31 – Kobasew (Hamhuis) (PP)
Volchenkov (Nepryaev) – 46:51	5–4

30
Shots
27

=== Scoring leaders ===
Rank	Player	Country	Pos	GP	G	A	Pts	PIM	+/−
1	Mike Cammalleri	Canada	F	7	7	4	11	10	+9
2	Brad Boyes	Canada	F	7	5	4	9	16	+8
3	Jared Aulin	Canada	F	7	4	5	9	4	+8
4	Aleš Hemský	Czech Republic	F	7	3	6	9	6	-1
5	Marek Svatoš	Slovakia	F	7	7	1	8	6	+5
6	Alexander Frolov	Russia	F	7	6	2	8	4	+5
7	Stanislav Chistov	Russia	F	7	4	4	8	0	+2
8	Tomáš Kopecký	Slovakia	F	7	3	5	8	22	+6
9	Jussi Jokinen	Finland	F	7	2	6	8	2	+3
10	Jarkko Immonen	Finland	F	7	4	3	7	6	+3

=== Goaltending leaders ===
Minimum 40% of team's ice time.

Rank	Player	Country	TOI	SOG	GA	GAA	Saves	Sv %	SO
1	Kari Lehtonen	Finland	359:36	123	7	1.17	116	94.31	1
2	Pascal Leclaire	Canada	299:25	143	9	1.80	134	93.71	2
3	Peter Hamerlík	Slovakia	207:31	101	8	2.31	93	92.08	0
4	Peter Budaj	Slovakia	212:29	136	11	3.11	125	91.91	1
5	Henrik Lundqvist	Sweden	419:15	160	15	2.15	145	90.63	1

=== Tournament awards ===
	Goaltender	Defencemen		Forwards		
IIHF Directorate Awards	(Finland) Kari Lehtonen	(Russia) Igor Knyazev		(Canada) Mike Cammalleri		
Media All-Star Team	(Canada) Pascal Leclaire	(Canada) Jay Bouwmeester	(Russia) Igor Knyazev	(Canada) Mike Cammalleri	(Slovakia) Marek Svatoš	(Russia) Stanislav Chistov

=== Final standings ===
	Team
1st place, gold medalist(s)	Russia
2nd place, silver medalist(s)	Canada
3rd place, bronze medalist(s)	Finland
4	Switzerland
5	United States
6	Sweden
7	Czech Republic
8	Slovakia
9	Belarus
10	France

== Division I ==

The Division I tournament was played in Kapfenberg and Zeltweg, Austria between December 9 and December 15, 2001.

=== Group A ===
Pos	Team	Pld	W	D	L	GF	GA	GD	Pts	Qualification	Austria men's national junior ice hockey team	Norway men's national junior ice hockey team	Kazakhstan men's national junior ice hockey team	Slovenia men's national junior ice hockey team
1	Austria	3	2	1	0	9	5	+4	5	Final round		3–2	5–2	1–1
2	Norway	3	2	0	1	12	10	+2	4	Final round	2–3		6–4	4–3
3	Kazakhstan	3	1	0	2	13	13	0	2	Placement round	2–5	4–6		7–2
4	Slovenia	3	0	1	2	6	12	−6	1	Placement round	1–1	3–4	2–7	

Source: IIHF.com at the Wayback Machine

=== Group B ===
Pos	Team	Pld	W	D	L	GF	GA	GD	Pts	Qualification	Germany men's national junior ice hockey team	Ukraine men's national junior ice hockey team	Italy men's national junior ice hockey team	Poland men's national junior ice hockey team
1	Germany	3	3	0	0	16	4	+12	6	Final round		2–1	8–1	6–2
2	Ukraine	3	1	1	1	7	7	0	3	Final round	1–2		3–3	3–2
3	Italy	3	0	2	1	10	17	−7	2	Placement round	1–8	3–3		6–6
4	Poland	3	0	1	2	10	15	−5	1	Placement round	2–6	2–3	6–6	

Source: IIHF.com at the Wayback Machine

=== Placement round ===
Consolation round
B3	Italy	4
A4	Slovenia	5
A3	Kazakhstan	11
B4	Poland	0

5th place game
A4	Slovenia	6
A3	Kazakhstan	11
7th place game
B4	Poland	6
B3	Italy	0

=== Final round ===
Semifinals
B1	Germany	3
A2	Norway	1
A1	Austria	9
B2	Ukraine	1

1st place game
B1	Germany	7
A1	Austria	1
3rd place game
A2	Norway	7
B2	Ukraine	1

Germany was promoted to the Top Division for the 2003 World Junior Ice Hockey Championships. Due to a restructuring of the tournament, no team was relegated from Division I, which in the 2003 tournament consisted of 12 teams in 2 groups.

== Division II ==

The Division II tournament was played in Zagreb, Croatia between December 30, 2001 and January 3, 2002.

=== Preliminary round ===
==== Group A ====
Pos	Team	Pld	W	D	L	GF	GA	GD	Pts	Promotion	Denmark men's national junior ice hockey team	Latvia men's national junior ice hockey team	Great Britain men's national junior ice hockey team	Netherlands men's national junior ice hockey team
1	Denmark	3	3	0	0	30	9	+21	6	Promoted to the 2003 Division I		6–5	12–2	12–2
2	Latvia	3	2	0	1	22	6	+16	4	Promoted to the 2003 Division I	5–6		6–0	11–0
3	Great Britain	3	1	0	2	7	19	−12	2		2–12	0–6		5–1
4	Netherlands	3	0	0	3	3	28	−25	0		2–12	0–11	1–5	

Source: IIHF.com at the Wayback Machine

==== Group B ====
Pos	Team	Pld	W	D	L	GF	GA	GD	Pts	Promotion	Japan men's national junior ice hockey team	Croatia men's national junior ice hockey team	Hungary men's national junior ice hockey team	Lithuania men's national junior ice hockey team
1	Japan	3	3	0	0	25	6	+19	6	Promoted to the 2003 Division I		9–1	7–2	9–3
2	Croatia	3	1	1	1	14	14	0	3	Promoted to the 2003 Division I	1–9		2–2	11–3
3	Hungary	3	1	1	1	7	10	−3	3		2–7	2–2		3–1
4	Lithuania	3	0	0	3	7	23	−16	0		3–9	3–11	1–3	

Source: IIHF.com at the Wayback Machine

=== Final round ===
All times local (CET/UTC+1).

==== 7th place game ====
January 3, 2002; 10:00	Netherlands	10–4 (5–0, 2–2, 3–2)	Lithuania	Dom Sportova, Zagreb; Attendance: 300

==== 5th place game ====
January 3, 2002; 13:30	Great Britain	9–4 (2–0, 2–3, 5–1)	Hungary	Dom Sportova, Zagreb; Attendance: 300

==== 3rd place game ====
January 3, 2002; 16:30	Latvia	10–1 (5–1, 2–0, 3–0)	Croatia	Dom Sportova, Zagreb; Attendance: 1,200

==== 1st place game ====
January 3, 2002; 20:00	Denmark	2–5 (0–1, 1–2, 1–2)	Japan	Dom Sportova, Zagreb; Attendance: 800

Japan, Denmark, Latvia, and Croatia were promoted to Division I for the 2003 World Junior Ice Hockey Championships. Due to a restructuring of the tournament, no team was relegated from Division II, which in the 2003 tournament consisted of 12 teams in 2 groups.

== Division III ==

The Division III tournament was played in Belgrade, Federal Republic of Yugoslavia between January 5 and January 9, 2002.

=== Preliminary round ===
==== Group A ====
Pos	Team	Pld	W	D	L	GF	GA	GD	Pts	Promotion	Estonia men's national junior ice hockey team	Serbia and Montenegro men's national junior ice hockey team	Iceland men's national junior ice hockey team	Bulgaria men's national junior ice hockey team
1	Estonia	3	3	0	0	53	4	+49	6	Promoted to the 2003 Division II		6–3	20–1	27–0
2	Yugoslavia	3	2	0	1	23	11	+12	4	Promoted to the 2003 Division II	3–6		11–3	9–2
3	Iceland	3	1	0	2	7	32	−25	2	Promoted to the 2003 Division II	1–20	3–11		3–1
4	Bulgaria	3	0	0	3	3	39	−36	0	Promoted to the 2003 Division II	0–27	2–9	1–3	

Source: IIHF.com at the Wayback Machine

==== Group B ====
Pos	Team	Pld	W	D	L	GF	GA	GD	Pts	Promotion	Spain men's national junior ice hockey team	Romania men's national junior ice hockey team	South Africa men's national junior ice hockey team	Mexico men's national junior ice hockey team
1	Spain	3	3	0	0	20	7	+13	6	Promoted to the 2003 Division II		6–5	3–0	11–2
2	Romania	3	2	0	1	21	10	+11	4	Promoted to the 2003 Division II	5–6		3–2	13–2
3	South Africa	3	1	0	2	8	10	−2	2	Promoted to the 2003 Division II	0–3	2–3		6–4
4	Mexico	3	0	0	3	8	30	−22	0	Promoted to the 2003 Division II	2–11	2–13	4–6	

Source: IIHF.com at the Wayback Machine

=== Final round ===
All times local (EET/UTC+2).

==== 7th place game ====
January 9, 2002; 11:30	Mexico	9–4 (3–1, 4–1, 2–2)	Bulgaria	Hala Pionir, Belgrade; Attendance: 300

==== 5th place game ====
January 9, 2002; 14:30	South Africa	4–3 (3–0, 0–2, 1–1)	Iceland	Hala Pionir, Belgrade; Attendance: 300

==== 3rd place game ====
January 9, 2002; 17:30	Yugoslavia	4–1 (2–0, 2–0, 0–1)	Romania	Hala Pionir, Belgrade; Attendance: 3,000

==== 1st place game ====
January 9, 2002; 20:30	Estonia	12–1 (3–0, 7–0, 2–1)	Spain	Hala Pionir, Belgrade; Attendance: 2,000

Due to a restructuring of the tournament, all teams were promoted to Division II for the 2003 World Junior Ice Hockey Championships, which consisted of 12 teams in 2 groups.

Preceded by 2001 World Juniors	World Junior Ice Hockey Championships; See also: 2002 World Championships	Succeeded by 2003 World Juniors
