= Oliver Maron =

Slovak ice hockey player

- Born: September 30, 1983 (age 41); Bratislava, Slovakia
- Height: 6 ft 0 in (183 cm)
- Weight: 190 lb (86 kg; 13 st 8 lb)
- Position: Defence
- Slovak Extraliga team: HC Slovan Bratislava
- NHL draft: Undrafted
- Playing career: 2000–2003

Oliver Maron (born September 30, 1983) is a Slovak professional ice hockey defenceman who played with HC Slovan Bratislava in the Slovak Extraliga. Maron played junior hockey with the Belleville Bulls.
