= Martin Falter =

Czech professional ice hockey goaltender

- Born: November 27, 1983 (age 42) Ostrava, Czechoslovakia
- Height: 6 ft 0 in (183 cm)
- Weight: 179 lb (81 kg; 12 st 11 lb)
- Position: Goaltender
- Catches: Right
- Played for: HC Kladno; HC Sparta Praha; HC Kometa Brno
- Playing career: 2001–present

Martin Falter (born November 27, 1983) is a Czech professional ice hockey goaltender. He finished his active career in HC Kometa Brno. Currently he is a goaltender coach in HC Olomouc.

== Playing career ==
He played with HC Kladno in the Czech Extraliga during the 2010–11 Czech Extraliga season. In the 2011–12 Czech Extraliga season he played in HC Sparta Praha. On May 2, 2012, Falter signed a two-years contract with HC Kometa Brno.
