= Serbia and Montenegro men's national junior ice hockey team =

Serbia and Montenegro
- Most points: Marko Sretovic (14)
- IIHF code: SCG

First international
- Slovakia 17 – 4 (Federal Republic of Yugoslavia) FR Yugoslavia (Tallinn, Estonia; December 31, 1994)

Biggest win
- (Federal Republic of Yugoslavia) FR Yugoslavia 15 – 1 Iceland (Novi Sad, FR Yugoslavia; December 29, 1998)

Biggest defeat
- Kazakhstan 18 – 2 (Federal Republic of Yugoslavia) FR Yugoslavia (Tallinn, Estonia; January 1, 1995)

IIHF World Junior Championship
- Appearances: 12 (first in 1995)
- Best result: 3rd in Division II Group B: (2003)

International record (W–L–T)
- 25–24–3

The Serbia and Montenegro men's national under 20 ice hockey team was the national under-20 ice hockey team in Serbia and Montenegro. The team represented Serbia and Montenegro at the International Ice Hockey Federation's IIHF World Junior Championship.
