= List of IIHF World Junior Championship media All-Star teams =

The IIHF World Junior Championship is an annual event organized by the International Ice Hockey Federation for national under-20 ice hockey teams from around the world. The Top Division features the top ten ranked hockey nations in the world. After each tournament, the media covering the tournament select a five-man All-Star Team consisting of three forwards, two defencemen and one goalie. Players named to the team, along with the countries they represent, are shown below from the first official tournament in 1977 until present.

== All-Star teams ==
Year	Goaltender	Defencemen		Forwards			Ref
1977	(Soviet Union) Alexander Tyzhnykh	(Soviet Union) Viacheslav Fetisov	(Finland) Risto Siltanen	(Canada) Dale McCourt	(Soviet Union) Igor Romashin	(Sweden) Bengt Gustafsson	
1978	(Soviet Union) Alexander Tyzhnykh	(Soviet Union) Viacheslav Fetisov	(Finland) Risto Siltanen	(Canada) Wayne Gretzky	(Czechoslovakia) Anton Šťastný	(Sweden) Mats Näslund	
1979	(Sweden) Pelle Lindbergh	(Soviet Union) Alexei Kasatonov	(Czechoslovakia) Ivan Černý	(Soviet Union) Vladimir Krutov	(Sweden) Thomas Steen	(Soviet Union) Anatoli Tarasov	
1980	(Finland) Jari Paavola	(Finland) Reijo Ruotsalainen	(Sweden) Tomas Jonsson	(Soviet Union) Vladimir Krutov	(Soviet Union) Igor Larionov	(Sweden) Håkan Loob	
1981	(Sweden) Lars Eriksson	(Czechoslovakia) Miloslav Horava	(Sweden) Håkan Nordin	(Sweden) Patrik Sundström	(Sweden) Jan Erixon	(Finland) Ari Lähteenmäki	
1982	(Canada) Mike Moffat	(Finland) Petri Skriko	(Soviet Union) Ilya Byakin	(Canada) Gord Kluzak	(Czechoslovakia) Vladimir Ruzicka	(Canada) Mike Moller	
1983	(Finland) Matti Rautiainen	(Soviet Union) Ilya Byakin	(Finland) Simo Saarinen	(Sweden) Tomas Sandström	(Soviet Union) German Volgin	(Czechoslovakia) Vladimír Růžička	
1984	(Soviet Union) Evgeny Belosheikin	(Soviet Union) Alexei Gusarov	(Czechoslovakia) Frantisek Musil	(Finland) Raimo Helminen	(Czechoslovakia) Petr Rosol	(Soviet Union) Nikolai Borschevsky	
1985	(Finland) Timo Lehkonen	(Canada) Bobby Dollas	(Soviet Union) Mikhail Tatarinov	(Czechoslovakia) Michal Pivoňka	(Finland) Esa Tikkanen	(Finland) Mikko Makela	
1986	(Soviet Union) Yevgeni Belosheikin	(Soviet Union) Mikhail Tatarinov	(Canada) Sylvain Côté	(Czechoslovakia) Michal Pivoňka	(Canada) Shayne Corson	(Soviet Union) Igor Vyazmikin	
1987	(Sweden) Sam Lindståhl	(United States) Brian Leetch	(Czechoslovakia) Jiří Látal	(United States) Scott Young	(Sweden) Ulf Dahlén	(Czechoslovakia) Juraj Jurík	
1988	(Canada) Jimmy Waite	(Finland) Teppo Numminen	(Canada) Greg Hawgood	(Soviet Union) Alexander Mogilny	(Canada) Theoren Fleury	(Soviet Union) Sergei Fedorov	
1989	(Soviet Union) Alexei Ivashkin	(Sweden) Ricard Persson	(Czechoslovakia) Milan Tichý	(Soviet Union) Pavel Bure	(United States) Jeremy Roenick	(Sweden) Niklas Eriksson	
1990	(Canada) Stéphane Fiset	(Czechoslovakia) Jiří Šlégr	(Soviet Union) Alexander Godynyuk	(Czechoslovakia) Robert Reichel	(Canada) Dave Chyzowski	(Czechoslovakia) Jaromir Jagr	
1991	(Switzerland) Pauli Jaks	(United States) Scott Lachance	(Soviet Union) Dmitri Yushkevich	(Canada) Eric Lindros	(Czechoslovakia) Martin Ručinský	(Canada) Mike Craig	
1992	(United States) Mike Dunham	(Canada) Scott Niedermayer	(Finland) Janne Gronvall	(Commonwealth of Independent States) Alexei Kovalev	(United States) Peter Ferraro	(Sweden) Michael Nylander	
1993	(Canada) Manny Legace	(Sweden) Kenny Jönsson	(Canada) Brent Tully	(Sweden) Peter Forsberg	(Canada) Paul Kariya	(Sweden) Markus Näslund	
1994	(Russia) Evgeni Ryabchikov	(Sweden) Kenny Jönsson	(Finland) Kimmo Timonen	(Sweden) Niklas Sundström	(Czech Republic) David Výborný	(Russia) Valeri Bure	
1995	(Ukraine) Igor Karpenko	(Canada) Bryan McCabe	(Sweden) Anders Eriksson	(Canada) Jason Allison	(Canada) Marty Murray	(Canada) Éric Dazé	
1996	(Canada) José Theodore	(Sweden) Mattias Öhlund	(Canada) Nolan Baumgartner	(Canada) Jarome Iginla	(Russia) Alexei Morozov	(Sweden) Johan Davidsson	
1997	(United States) Brian Boucher	(Canada) Chris Phillips	(Switzerland) Mark Streit	(Canada) Christian Dubé	(Russia) Sergei Samsonov	(United States) Mike York	
1998	(Switzerland) David Aebischer	(Russia) Andrei Markov	(Sweden) Pierre Hedin	(Finland) Olli Jokinen	(Finland) Eero Somervuori	(Russia) Maxim Balmochnykh	
1999	(Canada) Roberto Luongo	(Russia) Vitaly Vishnevskiy	(Canada) Brian Campbell	(Russia) Maxim Balmochnykh	(Canada) Daniel Tkaczuk	(United States) Brian Gionta	
2000	(United States) Rick DiPietro	(Canada) Mathieu Biron	(Russia) Alexander Ryazantsev	(Czech Republic) Milan Kraft	(Russia) Evgeny Muratov	(Russia) Alexei Tereshchenko	
2001	(Finland) Ari Ahonen	(Czech Republic) Rostislav Klesla	(Finland) Tuukka Mäntylä	(Canada) Jason Spezza	(Czech Republic) Pavel Brendl	(Finland) Jani Rita	
2002	(Canada) Pascal Leclaire	(Canada) Jay Bouwmeester	(Russia) Igor Knyazev	(Canada) Michael Cammalleri	(Slovakia) Marek Svatoš	(Russia) Stanislav Chistov	
2003	(Canada) Marc-André Fleury	(Canada) Carlo Colaiacovo	(Finland) Joni Pitkänen	(Russia) Yuri Trubachev	(Russia) Igor Grigorenko	(Canada) Scottie Upshall	
2004	(United States) Al Montoya	(Finland) Sami Lepistö	(Canada) Dion Phaneuf	(Canada) Jeff Carter	(United States) Zach Parise	(Finland) Valtteri Filppula	
2005	(Czech Republic) Marek Schwarz	(Canada) Dion Phaneuf	(United States) Ryan Suter	(Canada) Patrice Bergeron	(Canada) Jeff Carter	(Russia) Alexander Ovechkin	
2006	(Finland) Tuukka Rask	(Canada) Luc Bourdon	(United States) Jack Johnson	(Canada) Steve Downie	(Russia) Evgeni Malkin	(Finland) Lauri Tukonen	
2007	(Canada) Carey Price	(Canada) Kris Letang	(United States) Erik Johnson	(Canada) Jonathan Toews	(Russia) Alexei Cherepanov	(United States) Patrick Kane	
2008	(Canada) Steve Mason	(Canada) Drew Doughty	(Sweden) Victor Hedman	(Sweden) Patrik Berglund	(Russia) Viktor Tikhonov	(United States) James van Riemsdyk	
2009	(Slovakia) Jaroslav Janus	(Sweden) Erik Karlsson	(Canada) P. K. Subban	(Canada) John Tavares	(Canada) Cody Hodgson	(Russia) Nikita Filatov	
2010	(Switzerland) Benjamin Conz	(Canada) Alex Pietrangelo	(United States) John Carlson	(Canada) Jordan Eberle	(Switzerland) Nino Niederreiter	(United States) Derek Stepan	
2011	(United States) Jack Campbell	(Canada) Ryan Ellis	(Russia) Dmitri Orlov	(Canada) Brayden Schenn	(Canada) Ryan Johansen	(Russia) Evgeny Kuznetsov	
2012	(Czech Republic) Petr Mrazek	(Canada) Brandon Gormley	(Sweden) Oscar Klefbom	(Russia) Evgeny Kuznetsov	(Sweden) Max Friberg	(Finland) Mikael Granlund	
2013	(United States) John Gibson	(United States) Jacob Trouba	(United States) Jake McCabe	(Canada) Ryan Nugent-Hopkins	(Sweden) Filip Forsberg	(United States) Johnny Gaudreau	
2014	(Finland) Juuse Saros	(Finland) Rasmus Ristolainen	(Russia) Nikita Zadorov	(Canada) Anthony Mantha	(Sweden) Filip Forsberg	(Finland) Teuvo Teräväinen	
2015	(Slovakia) Denis Godla	(Sweden) Gustav Forsling	(Canada) Josh Morrissey	(Canada) Connor McDavid	(Canada) Sam Reinhart	(Canada) Max Domi	
2016	(Sweden) Linus Söderström	(Finland) Olli Juolevi	(United States) Zach Werenski	(Finland) Jesse Puljujärvi	(Finland) Patrik Laine	(United States) Auston Matthews	
2017	(Russia) Ilya Samsonov	(Canada) Thomas Chabot	(United States) Charlie McAvoy	(Russia) Kirill Kaprizov	(Sweden) Alexander Nylander	(United States) Clayton Keller	
2018	(Sweden) Filip Gustavsson	(Sweden) Rasmus Dahlin	(Canada) Cale Makar	(United States) Kieffer Bellows	(United States) Casey Mittelstadt	(Czech Republic) Filip Zadina	
2019	(Finland) Ukko-Pekka Luukkonen	(Russia) Alexander Romanov	(Sweden) Erik Brännström	(Russia) Grigori Denisenko	(Switzerland) Philipp Kurashev	(United States) Ryan Poehling	
2020	(Canada) Joel Hofer	(Sweden) Rasmus Sandin	(Russia) Alexander Romanov	(Sweden) Samuel Fagemo	(Canada) Barrett Hayton	(Canada) Alexis Lafrenière	
2021	(Canada) Devon Levi	(Canada) Bowen Byram	(Finland) Ville Heinola	(United States) Trevor Zegras	(Canada) Dylan Cozens	(Germany) Tim Stützle	
2022	(Sweden) Jesper Wallstedt	(Canada) Olen Zellweger	(Sweden) Emil Andrae	(Canada) Mason McTavish	(Finland) Joakim Kemell	(Czech Republic) Jan Myšák	
2023	(Czech Republic) Tomáš Suchánek	(Czech Republic) David Jiříček	(Sweden) Ludvig Jansson	(United States) Logan Cooley	(Czech Republic) Jiří Kulich	(Canada) Connor Bedard	
2024	(Sweden) Hugo Hävelid	(United States) Lane Hutson	(Sweden) Theo Lindstein	(United States) Cutter Gauthier	(Czech Republic) Jiří Kulich	(Sweden) Jonathan Lekkerimäki	
2025	(Finland) Petteri Rimpinen	(United States) Cole Hutson	(Sweden) Axel Sandin Pellikka	(United States) Ryan Leonard	(Czech Republic) Jakub Štancl	(United States) Gabe Perreault	
2026	(Sweden) Love Härenstam	(Canada) Zayne Parekh	(Czech Republic) Tomáš Galvas	(Canada) Michael Hage	(Sweden) Anton Frondell	(Czech Republic) Vojtěch Čihař	
