= Denmark men's national junior ice hockey team =

Denmark
- Nickname: Danish Lions
- Association: Danish Ice Hockey Union
- General manager: Morten Green
- Head coach: Martin Struzinki
- Assistants: Dan Jensen, Bjørn Østergaard
- Captain: Anton Linde
- Most points: Frans Nielsen (38)
- Team colors
- IIHF code: DEN
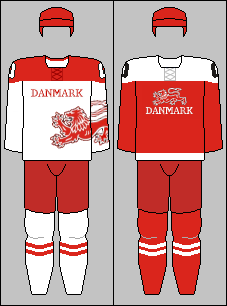

Ranking
- Current IIHF: 10

First international
- Denmark 3 – 0 Italy (Caen, France; March 5, 1979)

Biggest win
- Denmark 19 – 0 Spain (Belluno, Italy; March 21, 1988)

Biggest defeat
- Slovakia 22 – 0 Denmark (Esbjerg, Denmark; January 1, 1994)

IIHF World Junior Championship
- Appearances: 47 (first in 1979)
- Best result: 5th (2017)

International record (W–L–T)
- 89–77–14

The Danish men's national under 20 ice hockey team is the national under-20 ice hockey team in Denmark. The team represents Denmark at the International Ice Hockey Federation's World U20 Championships. Denmark has played in the top division in 2008, 2012 and 2015-2019. They've reached the quarterfinals three times, their best finish being 5th in 2017.

During the 2015 World Juniors the Danes won their first ever game in the Top Division with a 4–3 shootout win over Switzerland. This win allowed Denmark to finish 4th in Group B and, for the first time, advance to quarter finals, which guaranteed them their highest finish ever in the tournament and avoided relegation for the first time. After a quarter final loss to Canada, the Dane's finished 8th place. They competed in Group A in the Top Division at the 2016 World Junior Ice Hockey Championships in Helsinki, Finland, and finished in 8th place again, after a quarter final loss to Russia.

== History ==
- 1979 – 12th place (4th in Pool B)
- 1980 – 13th place (5th in Pool B)
- 1981 – 13th place (5th in Pool B)
- 1982 – 12th place (4th in Pool B)
- 1983 – 15th place (7th in Pool B)
- 1984 – 16th place (8th in Pool B)
- 1985 – 21st place (5th in Pool C)
- 1986 – 18th place (2nd in Pool C)
- 1987 – 18th place (2nd in Pool C)
- 1988 – 17th place (1st in Pool C)
- 1989 – 15th place (7th in Pool B)
- 1990 – 12th place (4th in Pool B)
- 1991 – 16th place (8th in Pool B)
- 1992 – 18th place (2nd in Pool C)
- 1993 – 18th place (2nd in Pool C)
- 1994 – 19th place (3rd in Pool C)
- 1995 – 19th place (3rd in Pool C)
- 1996 – 21st place (3rd in Pool C)
- 1997 – 21st place (3rd in Pool C)
- 1998 – 19th place (1st in Pool C)
- 1999 – 13th place (3rd in Pool B)
- 2000 – 18th place 8th in Pool B)
- 2001 – 22nd place (4th in Division II)
- 2002 – 20th place (2nd in Division II)
- 2003 – 19th place (5th in Division I Group B)
- 2004 – 13th place (2nd in Division I Group A)
- 2005 – 15th place (3rd in Division I Group B)
- 2006 – 14th place (2nd in Division I Group A)
- 2007 – 11th place (1st in Division I Group A)
- 2008 – 10th place
- 2009 – 14th place (2nd in Division I Group B)
- 2010 – 13th place (2nd in Division I Group A)
- 2011 – 12th place 1st in Division I Group B)
- 2012 – 10th place
- 2013 – 13th place (3rd in Division I Group A)
- 2014 – 11th place (1st in Division I Group A)
- 2015 – 8th place
- 2016 – 8th place
- 2017 – 5th place
- 2018 – 9th place
- 2019 – 10th place
- 2020 – 15th place (5th in Division I Group A)
- 2021 – Cancelled due to the coronavirus pandemic
- 2022 – 15th place (5th in Division I Group A)
- 2023 – 15th place (5th in Division I Group A)
- 2024 – 13th place (3rd in Division I Group A)
- 2025 – 11th place (1st in Division I Group A)
- 2026 – 10th place
