= List of IIHF World Junior Championship Directorate award winners =

The IIHF World Junior Championship is an annual event organized by the International Ice Hockey Federation for national under-20 ice hockey teams from around the world. The 'Top Division' features the top ten ranked hockey nations in the world. After each tournament, the Directorate of the IIHF selects the Best Goaltender, Best Defenceman, and Best Forward of the tournament. Winners of these awards, along with the countries they represent, are shown below from the first official tournament in 1977 until present.

Year	Best Goaltender		Best Defenceman		Best Forward		Note
1977	Jan Hrabák	Czechoslovakia	Viacheslav Fetisov	Soviet Union	Dale McCourt	Canada	
1978	Alexander Tyznych	Soviet Union	Viacheslav Fetisov	Soviet Union	Wayne Gretzky	Canada	
1979	Pelle Lindbergh	Sweden	Alexei Kasatonov	Soviet Union	Vladimir Krutov	Soviet Union	
1980	Jari Paavola	Finland	Reijo Ruotsalainen	Finland	Vladimir Krutov	Soviet Union	
1981	Lars Eriksson	Sweden	Miloslav Horava	Czechoslovakia	Patrik Sundström	Sweden	
1982	Mike Moffat	Canada	Gord Kluzak	Canada	Petri Skriko	Finland	
1983	Dominik Hašek	Czechoslovakia	Ilya Byakin	Soviet Union	Tomas Sandström	Sweden	
1984	Alan Perry	United States	Alexei Gusarov	Soviet Union	Raimo Helminen	Finland	
1985	Craig Billington	Canada	Vesa Salo	Finland	Michal Pivonka	Czechoslovakia	
1986	Evgeny Belosheikin	Soviet Union	Mikhail Tatarinov	Soviet Union	Jim Sandlak	Canada	
1987	Markus Ketterer	Finland	Calle Johansson	Sweden	Robert Kron	Czechoslovakia	
1988	Jimmy Waite	Canada	Teppo Numminen	Finland	Alexander Mogilny	Soviet Union	
1989	Alexei Ivashkin	Soviet Union	Ricard Persson	Sweden	Pavel Bure	Soviet Union	
1990	Stéphane Fiset	Canada	Alexander Godynyuk	Soviet Union	Robert Reichel	Czechoslovakia	
1991	Pauli Jaks	Switzerland	Jiří Šlégr	Czechoslovakia	Eric Lindros	Canada	
1992	Mike Dunham	United States	Darius Kasparaitis	CIS	Michael Nylander	Sweden	
1993	Manny Legacé	Canada	Janne Grönvall	Finland	Peter Forsberg	Sweden	
1994	Jamie Storr	Canada	Kenny Jönsson	Sweden	Niklas Sundström	Sweden	
1995	Yevgeni Tarasov	Russia	Bryan McCabe	Canada	Marty Murray	Canada	
1996	José Théodore	Canada	Mattias Öhlund	Sweden	Jarome Iginla	Canada	
1997	Marc Denis	Canada	Joe Corvo	United States	Alexei Morozov	Russia	
1998	David Aebischer	Switzerland	Pavel Skrbek	Czech Republic	Olli Jokinen	Finland	
1999	Roberto Luongo	Canada	Vitali Vishnevsky	Russia	Maxim Afinogenov	Russia	
2000	Rick DiPietro	United States	Alex Riazantsev	Russia	Milan Kraft	Czech Republic	
2001	Tomáš Duba	Czech Republic	Rostislav Klesla	Czech Republic	Pavel Brendl	Czech Republic	
2002	Kari Lehtonen	Finland	Igor Knyazev	Russia	Mike Cammalleri	Canada	
2003	Marc-André Fleury	Canada	Joni Pitkänen	Finland	Igor Grigorenko	Russia	
2004	Al Montoya	United States	Sami Lepistö	Finland	Zach Parise	United States	
2005	Marek Schwarz	Czech Republic	Dion Phaneuf	Canada	Alexander Ovechkin	Russia	
2006	Tuukka Rask	Finland	Marc Staal	Canada	Evgeni Malkin	Russia	
2007	Carey Price	Canada	Erik Johnson	United States	Alexei Cherepanov	Russia	
2008	Steve Mason	Canada	Drew Doughty	Canada	Viktor Tikhonov	Russia	
2009	Jacob Markström	Sweden	Erik Karlsson	Sweden	John Tavares	Canada	
2010	Benjamin Conz	Switzerland	Alex Pietrangelo	Canada	Jordan Eberle	Canada	
2011	Jack Campbell	United States	Ryan Ellis	Canada	Brayden Schenn	Canada	
2012	Petr Mrázek	Czech Republic	Brandon Gormley	Canada	Yevgeni Kuznetsov	Russia	
2013	John Gibson	United States	Jacob Trouba	United States	Ryan Nugent-Hopkins	Canada	
2014	Oscar Dansk	Sweden	Rasmus Ristolainen	Finland	Filip Forsberg	Sweden	
2015	Denis Godla	Slovakia	Vladislav Gavrikov	Russia	Max Domi	Canada	
2016	Linus Söderström	Sweden	Zach Werenski	United States	Jesse Puljujärvi	Finland	
2017	Felix Sandström	Sweden	Thomas Chabot	Canada	Kirill Kaprizov	Russia	
2018	Filip Gustavsson	Sweden	Rasmus Dahlin	Sweden	Casey Mittelstadt	United States	
2019	Pyotr Kochetkov	Russia	Alexander Romanov	Russia	Ryan Poehling	United States	
2020	Joel Hofer	Canada	Rasmus Sandin	Sweden	Alexis Lafrenière	Canada	
2021	Devon Levi	Canada	Topi Niemelä	Finland	Tim Stützle	Germany	
2022	Jesper Wallstedt	Sweden	Kasper Puutio	Finland	Mason McTavish	Canada	
2023	Adam Gajan	Slovakia	David Jiříček	Czech Republic	Connor Bedard	Canada	
2024	Hugo Hävelid	Sweden	Axel Sandin Pellikka	Sweden	Cutter Gauthier	United States	
2025	Petteri Rimpinen	Finland	Axel Sandin Pellikka	Sweden	Ryan Leonard	United States	
2026	Love Härenstam	Sweden	Adam Jiříček	Czech Republic	Anton Frondell	Sweden	
