= 1991 World Junior Ice Hockey Championships =

Tournament details
- Host country: Canada
- Venues: 9 (in 9 host cities)
- Dates: December 26, 1990 – January 4, 1991
- Teams: 8

Final positions
- Champions: Canada (5th title)
- Runners-up: Soviet Union
- Third place: Czechoslovakia
- Fourth place: United States

Tournament statistics
- Games played: 28
- Goals scored: 253 (9.04 per game)
- Attendance: 137,067 (4,895 per game)
- Scoring leader: (United States) Doug Weight (19 points)

The 1991 World Junior Ice Hockey Championships (1991 WJHC) was the 15th edition of the Ice Hockey World Junior Championship and was held in various communities in Saskatchewan, Canada. Canada won its second consecutive gold medal, and fifth overall, while the Soviet Union won silver, and Czechoslovakia the bronze.

== Final standings ==
The 1991 tournament was a round-robin format, with the top three teams winning gold, silver and bronze medals respectively.

Pos	Team	Pld	W	L	D	GF	GA	GD	Pts
1	Canada	7	5	1	1	40	18	+22	11
2	Soviet Union	7	5	1	1	44	15	+29	11
3	Czechoslovakia	7	5	2	0	44	19	+25	10
4	United States	7	4	2	1	45	19	+26	9
5	Finland	7	3	3	1	35	30	+5	7
6	Sweden	7	3	4	0	32	29	+3	6
7	Switzerland	7	1	6	0	5	48	−43	2
8	Norway	7	0	7	0	8	75	−67	0

Source: Hockey Canada

Norway was relegated to Pool B for 1992.

== Results ==
December 26, 1990	Canada	6 – 0	Switzerland	Saskatoon

December 26, 1990	Czechoslovakia	11 – 3	Norway	Rosetown

December 26, 1990	Finland	8 – 5	Sweden	Saskatoon

December 26, 1990	Soviet Union	4 – 2	United States	Prince Albert

December 27, 1990	Canada	4 – 4	United States	Saskatoon

December 27, 1990	Sweden	4 – 3	Czechoslovakia	Regina

December 28, 1990	Finland	7 – 1	Switzerland	Moose Jaw

December 28, 1990	Soviet Union	13 – 0	Norway	Saskatoon

December 29, 1990	Canada	10 – 1	Norway	Regina

December 29, 1990	Soviet Union	5 – 1	Sweden	Saskatoon

December 29, 1990	Czechoslovakia	10 – 0	Switzerland	Kindersley

December 29, 1990	United States	6 – 3	Finland	North Battleford

December 30, 1990	Canada	7 – 4	Sweden	Regina

December 30, 1990	Czechoslovakia	5 – 1	United States	Saskatoon

December 31, 1990	Finland	10 – 2	Norway	Saskatoon

December 31, 1990	Soviet Union	10 – 1	Switzerland	Yorkton

January 1, 1991	Canada	5 – 1	Finland	Saskatoon

January 1, 1991	United States	19 – 1	Norway	Regina

January 1, 1991	Sweden	6 – 1	Switzerland	Saskatoon

January 1, 1991	Soviet Union	5 – 3	Czechoslovakia	Regina

January 2, 1991	Czechoslovakia	6 – 5	Canada	Saskatoon

January 2, 1991	United States	5 – 2	Sweden	Humboldt

January 3, 1991	Soviet Union	5 – 5	Finland	Regina

January 3, 1991	Switzerland	2 – 1	Norway	Saskatoon

January 4, 1991	Canada	3 – 2	Soviet Union	Saskatoon

January 4, 1991	Sweden	10 – 0	Norway	Prince Albert

January 4, 1991	Czechoslovakia	6 – 1	Finland	Saskatoon

January 4, 1991	United States	8 – 0	Switzerland	Regina

=== Scoring leaders ===
Rank	Player	Country	G	A	Pts
1	Doug Weight	United States	5	14	19
2	Eric Lindros	Canada	6	11	17
3	Pavel Bure	Soviet Union	12	3	15
4	Martin Ručinský	Czechoslovakia	9	5	14
5	Žigmund Pálffy	Czechoslovakia	7	6	13
6	Marko Jantunen	Finland	3	10	13
7	Trent Klatt	United States	6	6	12
8	Ted Drury	United States	5	7	12
9	Vyacheslav Kozlov	Soviet Union	3	9	12
10	Mike Craig	Canada	6	5	11
10	Michael Nylander	Sweden	6	5	11
10	Vesa Viitakoski	Finland	6	5	11

=== Tournament awards ===
	IIHF Directorate Awards	Media All-Star Team
Goaltender	(Switzerland) Pauli Jaks	(Switzerland) Pauli Jaks
Defencemen	(Czechoslovakia) Jiří Šlégr	(Soviet Union) Dmitry Yushkevich (United States) Scott Lachance
Forwards	(Canada) Eric Lindros	(Canada) Mike Craig (Canada) Eric Lindros (Czechoslovakia) Martin Ručinský

== Pool B ==
Eight teams contested the second tier in Tychy and Oswiecim Poland from December 27 to January 5. It was played in a simple round robin format, each team playing seven games.

Standings

Pos	Team	Pld	W	L	D	GF	GA	GD	Pts	Germany men's national junior ice hockey team	Poland men's national junior ice hockey team	France men's national junior ice hockey team	Japan men's national junior ice hockey team	Romania men's national junior ice hockey team	Netherlands men's national junior ice hockey team	Austria men's national junior ice hockey team	Denmark men's national junior ice hockey team
1	Germany	7	6	0	1	49	15	+34	13		5–3	2–2	7–4	9–1	8–1	11–2	7–2
2	Poland	7	6	1	0	53	17	+36	12	3–5		5–4	7–2	6–3	10–0	14–0	8–3
3	France	7	4	1	2	42	19	+23	10	2–2	4–5		4–4	13–3	7–1	5–1	7–3
4	Japan	7	4	2	1	34	22	+12	9	4–7	2–7	4–4		7–0	4–2	6–1	7–1
5	Romania	7	2	4	1	23	43	−20	5	1–9	3–6	3–13	0–7		3–3	4–2	9–3
6	Netherlands	7	1	5	1	16	43	−27	3	1–8	0–10	1–7	2–4	3–3		6–3	3–8
7	Austria	7	1	6	0	13	48	−35	2	2–11	0–14	1–5	1–6	2–4	3–6		4–2
8	Denmark	7	1	6	0	22	45	−23	2	2–7	3–8	3–7	1–7	3–9	8–3	2–4	

Legend: Blue = home team win; Red = away team win; Yellow = draw.

Germany was promoted to Pool A and Denmark was relegated to Pool C for 1992.

== Pool C ==
Eight teams contested the third tier in Belgrade Yugoslavia from December 27 to January 5. It was played in a simple round robin format, each team playing seven games. Greece's national junior team made their debut this year.

Standings

Pos	Team	Pld	W	L	D	GF	GA	GD	Pts	North Korea men's national junior ice hockey team	Italy men's national junior ice hockey team	Yugoslavia men's national junior ice hockey team	Great Britain men's national junior ice hockey team	South Korea men's national junior ice hockey team	Bulgaria men's national junior ice hockey team	Hungary men's national junior ice hockey team	Greece men's national junior ice hockey team
1	North Korea	7	6	1	0	50	18	+32	12		4–3	1–9	4–2	5–2	10–1	6–1	20–0
2	Italy	7	6	1	0	57	11	+46	12	3–4		6–2	5–2	5–1	8–1	9–0	21–1
3	Yugoslavia	7	5	1	1	77	21	+56	11	9–1	2–6		5–2	7–7	13–2	8–2	33–1
4	Great Britain	7	4	3	0	45	20	+25	8	2–4	2–5	2–5		3–2	5–1	9–3	22–0
5	South Korea	7	3	3	1	55	28	+27	7	2–5	1–5	7–7	2–3		8–2	9–5	26–1
6	Bulgaria	7	2	5	0	34	48	−14	4	1–10	1–8	2–13	1–5	2–8		5–3	22–1
7	Hungary	7	1	6	0	28	46	−18	2	1–6	0–9	2–8	3–9	5–9	3–5		14–0
8	Greece	7	0	7	0	4	158	−154	0	0–20	1–21	1–33	0–22	1–26	1–22	0–14	

Legend: Blue = home team win; Red = away team win; Yellow = draw.

North Korea was promoted to Pool B for 1992.
