= Alexander Serikow =

German ice hockey player

Personal information
- Nationality: German
- Born: 23 June 1975 (age 49); Landshut, Germany

Sport
- Sport: Ice hockey

Alexander Serikow (born 23 June 1975) is a German ice hockey player. He competed in the men's tournament at the 1994 Winter Olympics.

== Career statistics ==
=== Regular season and playoffs ===
			Regular season					Playoffs
Season	Team	League	GP	G	A	Pts	PIM	GP	G	A	Pts	PIM
1990–91	EV Landshut	GER U20
1991–92	EV Landshut	GER U20
1992–93	Mannheimer ERC	GER U20
1992–93	Mannheimer ERC	1.GBun	35	1	0	1	2	8	0	0	0	0
1993–94	Mannheimer ERC	GER U20
1993–94	Mannheimer ERC	1.GBun	34	3	4	7	41	4	1	0	1	6
1994–95	Adler Mannheim	DEL	41	11	16	27	36	10	1	3	4	29
1995–96	Adler Mannheim	DEL	15	3	12	15	12	8	1	0	1	10
1996–97	Adler Mannheim	DEL	47	4	8	12	89	9	1	3	4	8
1997–98	Adler Mannheim	DEL	49	11	13	24	103	9	9	5	14	37
1998–99	Adler Mannheim	DEL	49	8	9	17	117	12	5	2	7	39
1999–2000	München Barons	DEL	47	8	21	29	70	11	2	2	4	10
2000–01	München Barons	DEL	53	5	13	18	50	11	0	2	2	2
2001–02	München Barons	DEL	51	3	6	9	50	9	0	0	0	2
2002–03	Kassel Huskies	DEL	52	20	12	32	52	7	5	0	5	8
2003–04	Kassel Huskies	DEL	48	10	12	22	52	—	—	—	—	—
2004–05	Kassel Huskies	DEL	17	3	2	5	14	—	—	—	—	—
2004–05	Hannover Scorpions	DEL	7	3	1	4	4	—	—	—	—	—
2005–06	Kassel Huskies	DEL	17	2	2	4	6	—	—	—	—	—
2006–07	Landshut Cannibals	GER.2	16	6	4	10	20	—	—	—	—	—
2007–08	Bietigheim Steelers	GER.2	36	10	13	23	53	5	2	0	2	18
2008–09	Bietigheim Steelers	GER.2	48	19	24	43	50	12	8	7	15	2
2009–10	Bietigheim Steelers	GER.2	51	33	22	55	61	12	8	4	12	20
2010–11	Bietigheim Steelers	GER.2	45	13	16	29	63	2	0	0	0	4
2009–10	Heilbronner Falken	GER.2	30	5	8	13	18	7	1	2	3	8
DEL totals			493	91	127	218	655	86	24	17	41	145
GER.2 totals			226	86	87	173	265	38	19	13	32	52

=== International ===
Year	Team	Event	GP	G	A	Pts	PIM
1991	Germany	EJC	5	0	1	1	6
1993	Germany	WJC	7	2	2	4	6
1993	Germany	EJC	6	1	0	1	16
1994	Germany	WJC	7	1	2	3	4
1994	Germany	OG	6	0	1	1	0
1995	Germany	WJC	7	2	9	11	4
1995	Germany	WC	5	0	0	0	0
1997	Germany	WC	8	0	0	0	10
1999	Germany	WC B	7	2	2	4	2
Junior totals			32	6	14	20	36
Senior totals			26	2	3	5	12

"Alexander Serikow". Elite Prospects.
