= 1995 World Ice Hockey Championships =

1995 World Ice Hockey Championships may refer to:

- 1995 Men's World Ice Hockey Championships
- 1995 World Junior Ice Hockey Championships
