= 1981 World Junior Ice Hockey Championships =

1981 IIHF World U20 Championship
Tournament details
- Host country: West Germany
- Venue(s): 6 (in 6 host cities)
- Dates: December 27, 1980 – January 2, 1981
- Teams: 8

Final positions
- Champions: Sweden (1st title)
- Runner-up: Finland
- Third place: Soviet Union
- Fourth place: Czechoslovakia

Tournament statistics
- Games played: 20
- Goals scored: 207 (10.35 per game)
- Scoring leader(s): (West Germany) Dieter Hegen (11 points)

The 1981 World Junior Ice Hockey Championships (1981 WJHC) was the fifth edition of the Ice Hockey World Junior Championship and was held from December 27, 1980, until January 2, 1981. The tournament was held in Füssen, West Germany. Sweden won the gold medal, while Finland won the silver, and the Soviet Union bronze.

== Pool A ==
The 1981 tournament divided participants into two divisions of four teams, each playing three games. The top two teams in each division advanced to the A division in the medal round, while the bottom two were placed in a B division. Each division played another round robin. The top three teams in the A division won the gold, silver and bronze medals. Teams that faced each other in the first round had their results carried over to the medal rounds.

=== Final standings ===
This is the aggregate standings, ordered according to final placing. The four teams in the A division in the medal round were ranked one through four, while the four teams in the B division were ranked five through eight regardless of overall record.

Pos	Team	Pld	W	L	D	GF	GA	GD	Pts
1	Sweden	5	4	0	1	25	11	+14	9
2	Finland	5	3	1	1	29	18	+11	7
3	Soviet Union	5	3	2	0	36	14	+22	6
4	Czechoslovakia	5	1	1	3	34	21	+13	5
5	West Germany	5	3	2	0	29	24	+5	6
6	United States	5	2	3	0	19	27	−8	4
7	Canada	5	1	3	1	26	25	+1	3
8	Austria	5	0	5	0	9	67	−58	0

Source: Hockey Canada

Austria was relegated to Pool B for the 1982 World Junior Ice Hockey Championships.

=== Preliminary round ===
==== Gold group ====
Team	Pld	W	L	D	GF	GA	GD	Pts
Soviet Union	3	3	0	0	31	5	+26	6
Czechoslovakia	3	1	1	1	25	12	+13	3
Canada	3	1	1	1	17	11	+6	3
Austria	3	0	3	0	6	51	−45	0

Source: Hockey Canada

December 27, 1980	Czechoslovakia	3 – 3 (1–0, 0–2, 2–1)	Canada	Kaufbeuren

December 27, 1980	Soviet Union	19 – 1 (7–0, 8–0, 4–1)	Austria	Augsburg

December 28, 1980	Soviet Union	7 – 3 (3–1, 3–0, 1–2)	Canada	Landsberg

December 28, 1980	Czechoslovakia	21 – 4 (6–1, 6–3, 9–0)	Austria	Füssen

December 30, 1980	Canada	11 – 1	Austria	Landsberg

December 30, 1980	Soviet Union	5 – 1 (2–1, 0–0, 3–0)	Czechoslovakia	Füssen

==== Blue group ====
Team	Pld	W	L	D	GF	GA	GD	Pts
Sweden	3	3	0	0	19	6	+13	6
Finland	3	2	1	0	17	9	+8	4
West Germany	3	1	2	0	13	17	−4	2
United States	3	0	3	0	5	22	−17	0

Source: Hockey Canada

December 27, 1980	West Germany	3 – 7 (2–3, 0–2, 1–2)	Sweden	Füssen

December 27, 1980	Finland	8 – 1 (0–0, 5–1, 3–0)	United States	Landsberg

December 28, 1980	West Germany	6 – 8 (1–3, 3–4, 2–1)	Finland	Oberstdorf

December 28, 1980	Sweden	10 – 2 (0–1, 6–1, 4–0)	United States	Augsburg

December 30, 1980	Sweden	2 – 1 (0–1, 2–0, 0–0)	Finland	Kempten

December 30, 1980	West Germany	4 – 2	United States	Kaufbeuren

=== Consolation round ===
Results from any games played during the preliminary round were carried forward to the consolation round.

Team	Pld	W	L	D	GF	GA	GD	Pts
West Germany	3	3	0	0	20	9	+11	6
United States	3	2	1	0	16	9	+7	4
Canada	3	1	2	0	20	15	+5	2
Austria	3	0	3	0	4	27	−23	0

Source: Hockey Canada

December 31, 1980	United States	7 – 3 (2–1, 2–2, 3–0)	Canada	Landsberg

December 31, 1980	West Germany	9 – 1 (1–0, 5–0, 3–1)	Austria	Füssen

January 2, 1981	West Germany	7 – 6 (5–2, 2–3, 0–1)	Canada	Kaufbeuren

January 2, 1981	United States	7 – 2 (2–0, 2–1, 3–1)	Austria	Füssen

=== Championship round ===
Results from any games played during the preliminary round were carried forward to the championship round.

Team	Pld	W	L	D	GF	GA	GD	Pts
Sweden	3	2	0	1	8	6	+2	5
Finland	3	1	1	1	13	11	+2	3
Soviet Union	3	1	2	0	10	10	0	2
Czechoslovakia	3	0	1	2	10	14	−4	2

Source: Hockey Canada

December 31, 1980	Finland	6 – 3 (2–0, 3–1, 1–2)	Soviet Union	Kaufbeuren

December 31, 1980	Sweden	3 – 3 (0–1, 2–1, 1–1)	Czechoslovakia	Oberstdorf

January 2, 1981	Sweden	3 – 2 (2–1, 1–1, 0–0)	Soviet Union	Augsburg; Attendance: 2700

January 2, 1981	Czechoslovakia	6 – 6 (2–2, 1–2, 3–2)	Finland	Landsberg

=== Scoring leaders ===
Rank	Player	Country	G	A	Pts
1	Dieter Hegen	West Germany	8	1	9
2	Dale Hawerchuk	Canada	5	4	9
2	Vladimir Svitek	Czechoslovakia	5	4	9
2	Ari Lähteenmäki	Finland	5	4	9
2	Bobby Carpenter	United States	5	4	9
6	Håkan Nordin	Sweden	2	7	9
7	Jan Vodila	Czechoslovakia	5	3	8
8	Patrik Sundström	Sweden	7	0	7
9	Pekka Järvelä	Finland	5	2	7
10	Klaus Götsch	West Germany	4	3	7

=== Tournament awards ===
	IIHF Directorate Awards	Media All-Star Team
Goaltender	(Sweden) Lars Eriksson	(Sweden) Lars Eriksson
Defencemen	(Czechoslovakia) Miloslav Hořava	(Sweden) Håkan Nordin (Czechoslovakia) Miloslav Hořava
Forwards	(Sweden) Patrik Sundström	(Sweden) Jan Erixon (Sweden) Patrik Sundström (Finland) Ari Lähteenmäki

== Pool B ==
The second tier was contested from March 23–29, in Strasbourg, France. Eight teams were divided into two round robin groups where the top two, and bottom two, graduated to meet their respective opponents in a final round robin. Results between competitors who migrated together were carried forward. Yugoslavia made their debut, replacing Hungary.

=== Preliminary round ===
==== Group A ====
Team	Pld	W	L	D	GF	GA	GD	Pts
Switzerland	3	3	0	0	25	4	+21	6
Netherlands	3	2	1	0	9	13	−4	4
Denmark	3	1	2	0	10	15	−5	2
Yugoslavia	3	0	3	0	8	20	−12	0

Netherlands	3 – 2 (1–1, 2–0, 0–1)	Denmark	Strasbourg

Switzerland	7 – 3 (2–0, 1–2, 4–1)	Yugoslavia	Strasbourg

Switzerland	8 – 1 (1–1, 3–0, 4–0)	Denmark	Strasbourg

Netherlands	6 – 1 (2–1, 1–0, 3–0)	Yugoslavia	Strasbourg

Switzerland	10 – 0 (5–0, 3–0, 2–0)	Netherlands	Strasbourg

Denmark	7 – 4 (1–1, 1–1, 5–2)	Yugoslavia	Strasbourg

==== Group B ====
Team	Pld	W	L	D	GF	GA	GD	Pts
Norway	3	2	0	1	20	13	+7	5
Poland	3	2	1	0	25	11	+14	4
Italy	3	1	1	1	13	20	−7	3
France	3	0	3	0	10	24	−14	0

Norway	5 – 5 (0–1, 3–1, 2–3)	Italy	Strasbourg

France	4 – 8 (2–3, 2–2, 0–3)	Poland	Strasbourg

Poland	12 – 1 (4–0, 4–0, 4–1)	Italy	Strasbourg

France	3 – 9 (0–4, 2–2, 1–3)	Norway	Strasbourg

Norway	6 – 5 (0–3, 2–1, 4–1)	Poland	Strasbourg

France	3 – 7 (2–2, 3–0, 2–1)	Italy	Strasbourg

=== Consolation round ===
Results from any games played during the preliminary round were carried forward to the consolation round.

Team	Pld	W	L	D	GF	GA	GD	Pts
Denmark	3	3	0	0	19	11	+8	6
Yugoslavia	3	1	1	1	16	14	+2	3
Italy	3	1	2	0	11	16	−5	2
France	3	0	2	1	13	18	−5	1

France	6 – 7 (0–2, 5–1, 1–4)	Denmark	Strasbourg

Italy	3 – 8 (0–2, 2–2, 1–4)	Yugoslavia	Strasbourg

France	4 – 4 (1–2, 0–2, 3–0)	Yugoslavia	Strasbourg

Denmark	5 – 1 (0–0, 2–1, 3–0)	Italy	Strasbourg

=== Promotion round ===
Results from any games played during the preliminary round were carried forward to the promotion round.

Team	Pld	W	L	D	GF	GA	GD	Pts
Switzerland	3	2	0	1	19	6	+13	5
Norway	3	2	0	1	18	10	+8	5
Poland	3	1	2	0	14	11	+3	2
Netherlands	3	0	3	0	1	25	−24	0

Switzerland was promoted to Pool A for the 1982 World Junior Ice Hockey Championships.

Norway	8 – 1 (2–1, 5–0, 1–0)	Netherlands	Strasbourg

Switzerland	5 – 2 (2–0, 2–1, 1–1)	Poland	Strasbourg

Netherlands	0 – 7 (0–2, 0–2, 0–3)	Poland	Strasbourg

Switzerland	4 – 4 (0–0, 3–1, 1–3)	Norway	Strasbourg

=== Scoring leaders ===
Rank	Player	Country	G	A	Pts
1	Murajica Pajič	Yugoslavia	10	1	11
2	Alfred Lüthl	Switzerland	7	4	11
3	Martin Pavlu	Italy	5	6	11
4	Stanislaw Szpreglewski	Poland	9	0	9
5	Beat Eggimann	Switzerland	5	4	9
6	Guy Ireland	France	5	3	8
