= 1992 World Junior Ice Hockey Championships =

1992 edition of the World Junior Ice Hockey Championships

1992 IIHF World U20 Championship
Tournament details
- Host country: Germany
- Venues: 2 (in 2 host cities)
- Dates: December 26, 1991 – January 4, 1992
- Teams: 8

Final positions
- Champions: CIS (1st title)
- Runners-up: Sweden
- Third place: United States
- Fourth place: Finland

Tournament statistics
- Games played: 28
- Goals scored: 214 (7.64 per game)
- Attendance: 55,750 (1,991 per game)
- Scoring leader: (Sweden) Michael Nylander (17 points)

The 1992 World Junior Ice Hockey Championships (1992 WJHC) was the 16th edition of the Ice Hockey World Junior Championship and was held from December 26, 1991, until January 4, 1992. It was held in Füssen and Kaufbeuren, Germany. The Commonwealth of Independent States won gold, while Sweden won silver, and the United States took home the bronze medal.

== Final standings ==
The 1992 tournament was a round-robin format, with the top three teams winning gold, silver and bronze medals respectively. The day the tournament began, the Soviet Union formally dissolved. In the week that followed the team continued to play as the Soviet Union, but on January 1, 1992, the team was renamed the Commonwealth of Independent States. Three players on the team, however, Sergejs Žoltoks and Sandis Ozoliņš (from Latvia) and Darius Kasparaitis (from Lithuania) were from nations not part of the Commonwealth.

Pos	Team	Pld	W	L	D	GF	GA	GD	Pts
1	CIS	7	6	1	0	39	13	+26	12
2	Sweden	7	5	1	1	41	24	+17	11
3	United States	7	5	2	0	30	22	+8	10
4	Finland	7	3	3	1	21	21	0	7
5	Czechoslovakia	7	3	4	0	28	25	+3	6
6	Canada	7	2	3	2	21	30	−9	6
7	Germany	7	1	6	0	15	40	−25	2
8	Switzerland	7	1	6	0	19	40	−21	2

Source: Hockey Canada

Switzerland was relegated to Pool B for 1993.

== Results ==
December 26, 1991	Canada	5 – 4	Germany	Füssen

December 26, 1991	Sweden	8 – 4	Czechoslovakia	Füssen

December 26, 1991	CIS	10 – 2	Switzerland	Kaufbeuren

December 26, 1991	United States	5 – 1	Finland	Füssen

December 27, 1991	Canada	6 – 4	Switzerland	Füssen

December 27, 1991	Finland	4 – 1	Czechoslovakia	Kaufbeuren

December 27, 1991	CIS	4 – 3	Sweden	Füssen

December 27, 1991	United States	6 – 2	Germany	Füssen

December 29, 1991	Canada	2 – 2	Sweden	Kaufbeuren

December 29, 1991	CIS	4 – 1	Finland	Füssen

December 29, 1991	Czechoslovakia	8 – 2	Germany	Füssen

December 29, 1991	United States	5 – 1	Switzerland	Füssen

December 30, 1991	Finland	2 – 2	Canada	Füssen

December 30, 1991	Switzerland	4 – 2	Czechoslovakia	Füssen

December 31, 1991	CIS	7 – 0	Germany	Füssen

December 31, 1991	Sweden	8 – 6	United States	Kaufbeuren

January 1, 1992	United States	5 – 3	Canada	Füssen

January 1, 1992	Sweden	4 – 3	Switzerland	Füssen

January 1, 1992	Finland	2 – 0	Germany	Kaufbeuren

January 1, 1992	Czechoslovakia	5 – 2	CIS	Füssen

January 2, 1992	Czechoslovakia	6 – 1	Canada	Füssen

January 2, 1992	Finland	7 – 3	Switzerland	Füssen

January 2, 1992	Sweden	10 – 1	Germany	Füssen

January 2, 1992	CIS	5 – 0	United States	Kaufbeuren

January 4, 1992	CIS	7 – 2	Canada	Füssen

January 4, 1992	Sweden	6 – 4	Finland	Füssen

January 4, 1992	Germany	6 – 2	Switzerland	Kaufbeuren

January 4, 1992	United States	3 – 2	Czechoslovakia	Füssen

=== Scoring leaders ===
Rank	Player	Country	G	A	Pts
1	Michael Nylander	Sweden	8	9	17
2	Peter Forsberg	Sweden	3	8	11
3	Markus Näslund	Sweden	8	2	10
4	Mikael Renberg	Sweden	6	4	10
5	Alexei Kovalev	CIS	5	5	10
6	Eric Lindros	Canada	2	8	10
7	Jan Čaloun	Czechoslovakia	8	1	9
7	Jarkko Varvio	Finland	8	1	9
9	Kristian Gahn	Sweden	3	6	9
9	Róbert Petrovický	Czechoslovakia	3	6	9

=== Tournament awards ===
	IIHF Directorate Awards	Media All-Star Team
Goaltender	(United States) Mike Dunham	(United States) Mike Dunham
Defencemen	(Commonwealth of Independent States) Darius Kasparaitis	(Canada) Scott Niedermayer (Finland) Janne Grönvall
Forwards	(Sweden) Michael Nylander	(Commonwealth of Independent States) Alexei Kovalev (Sweden) Michael Nylander (United States) Peter Ferraro

== Pool B ==
Eight teams contested the second tier this year in Tychy and Oswiecim Poland from December 27 to January 5. It was played in a simple round robin format, each team playing seven games. This tournament offered a rather improbable result; four of the eight teams finished tied for first.

Standings

Pos	Team	Pld	W	L	D	GF	GA	GD	Pts	Japan men's national junior ice hockey team	Poland men's national junior ice hockey team	Norway men's national junior ice hockey team	France men's national junior ice hockey team	Romania men's national junior ice hockey team	Netherlands men's national junior ice hockey team	Austria men's national junior ice hockey team	North Korea men's national junior ice hockey team
1	Japan	7	5	2	0	32	18	+14	10		7–4	2–4	4–2	3–2	5–2	2–3	9–1
2	Poland	7	5	2	0	42	19	+23	10	4–7		5–3	5–1	3–6	9–0	7–2	9–0
3	Norway	7	5	2	0	45	17	+28	10	4–2	3–5		1–4	8–0	14–2	6–2	9–2
4	France	7	5	2	0	31	15	+16	10	2–4	1–5	4–1		6–1	5–1	4–1	9–2
5	Romania	7	4	3	0	23	26	−3	8	2–3	6–3	0–8	1–6		3–0	3–2	8–4
6	Netherlands	7	2	5	0	14	38	−24	4	2–5	0–9	2–14	1–5	0–3		4–1	5–1
7	Austria	7	2	5	0	16	29	−13	4	3–2	2–7	2–6	1–4	2–3	1–4		5–3
8	North Korea	7	0	7	0	13	54	−41	0	1–9	0–9	2–9	2–9	4–8	1–5	3–5	

Japan was promoted to Pool A and North Korea was relegated to Pool C for 1993.

== Pool C ==
Pool C was contested by nine teams from December 28, to January 4, in Marino and Rome Italy. In the first round the nine teams were divided into three groups of three. The second round pitted the three first place teams against each other, likewise for the second place teams. Greece was disqualified for using an ineligible player, so they did not participate in the final round.

=== Preliminary round ===
Group A

Team	Pld	W	L	D	GF	GA	GD	Pts	Italy men's national junior ice hockey team	South Korea men's national junior ice hockey team	Greece men's national junior ice hockey team
Italy	2	2	0	0	21	1	+20	4		8–1	13–0
South Korea	2	1	1	0	8	8	0	2	1–8		7–0
Greece	2	0	2	0	0	20	−20	0	0–13	0–7	

Group B

Team	Pld	W	L	D	GF	GA	GD	Pts	Denmark men's national junior ice hockey team	Hungary men's national junior ice hockey team	Bulgaria men's national junior ice hockey team
Denmark	2	2	0	0	22	1	+21	4		10–0	12–1
Hungary	2	1	1	0	8	10	−2	2	0–10		8–0
Bulgaria	2	0	2	0	1	20	−19	0	1–12	0–8	

Group C

Team	Pld	W	L	D	GF	GA	GD	Pts	Great Britain men's national junior ice hockey team	Spain men's national junior ice hockey team	Yugoslavia men's national junior ice hockey team
Great Britain	2	1	1	0	16	9	+7	2		4–5	12–4
Spain	2	1	1	0	8	10	−2	2	5–4		3–6
Yugoslavia	2	1	1	0	10	15	−5	2	4–12	6–3	

=== Final Round ===
Promotion Group
Group A

Team	Pld	W	L	D	GF	GA	GD	Pts	Italy men's national junior ice hockey team	Denmark men's national junior ice hockey team	Great Britain men's national junior ice hockey team
Italy	2	2	0	0	9	5	+4	4		5–2	4–3
Denmark	2	1	1	0	8	8	0	2	2–5		6–3
Great Britain	2	0	2	0	6	10	−4	0	3–4	3–6	

Italy was promoted to Pool B for 1993.

Fourth Place Group
Group A

Team	Pld	W	L	D	GF	GA	GD	Pts	Spain men's national junior ice hockey team	Hungary men's national junior ice hockey team	South Korea men's national junior ice hockey team
Spain	2	2	0	0	11	8	+3	4		5–4	6–4
Hungary	2	1	1	0	8	8	0	2	4–5		4–3
South Korea	2	0	2	0	7	10	−3	0	4–6	3–4	

Seventh Place

Yugoslavia 1 - 1 Bulgaria
