= Sweden men's national junior ice hockey team =

Hockey team representing Sweden

Sweden
- Nickname: Juniorkronorna (The Junior Crowns)
- Association: Swedish Ice Hockey Association
- Head coach: (Sweden) Magnus Hävelid
- Assistants: (Sweden) Anders Johansson (Sweden) Henrik Stridh
- Captain: Jack Berglund
- Top scorer: Markus Näslund (21)
- Most points: Peter Forsberg (42)
- Team colors
- IIHF code: SWE
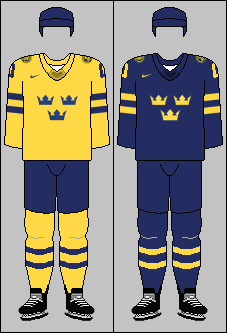

First international
- Czechoslovakia 6 – 4 Sweden (Leningrad, Soviet Union; December 27, 1973)

Biggest win
- Sweden 20 – 1 Japan (Gävle, Sweden; December 30, 1992)

Biggest defeat
- Canada 10 – 2 Sweden (Winnipeg or Brandon, Manitoba, Canada; December 30, 1974)

IIHF World Junior Championship
- Appearances: 50 (first in 1977)
- Best result: (gold) (1981, 2012, 2026)

International record (W–L–T)
- 209-105-12

Medal record

World Junior Championship
| Gold medal – first place | 1981 West Germany | Sweden |
| Gold medal – first place | 2012 Canada | Sweden |
| Gold medal – first place | 2026 United States | Sweden |
| Silver medal – second place | 1978 Canada | Sweden |
| Silver medal – second place | 1989 USA | Sweden |
| Silver medal – second place | 1992 Germany | Sweden |
| Silver medal – second place | 1993 Sweden | Sweden |
| Silver medal – second place | 1994 Czech Republic | Sweden |
| Silver medal – second place | 1996 USA | Sweden |
| Silver medal – second place | 2008 Czech Republic | Sweden |
| Silver medal – second place | 2009 Canada | Sweden |
| Silver medal – second place | 2013 Russia | Sweden |
| Silver medal – second place | 2014 Sweden | Sweden |
| Silver medal – second place | 2018 USA | Sweden |
| Silver medal – second place | 2024 Sweden | Sweden |
| Bronze medal – third place | 1975 Canada/USA | Sweden |
| Bronze medal – third place | 1979 Sweden | Sweden |
| Bronze medal – third place | 1980 Finland | Sweden |
| Bronze medal – third place | 1987 Czechoslovakia | Sweden |
| Bronze medal – third place | 1995 Canada | Sweden |
| Bronze medal – third place | 2010 Canada | Sweden |
| Bronze medal – third place | 2020 Czech Republic | Sweden |
| Bronze medal – third place | 2022 Canada | Sweden |

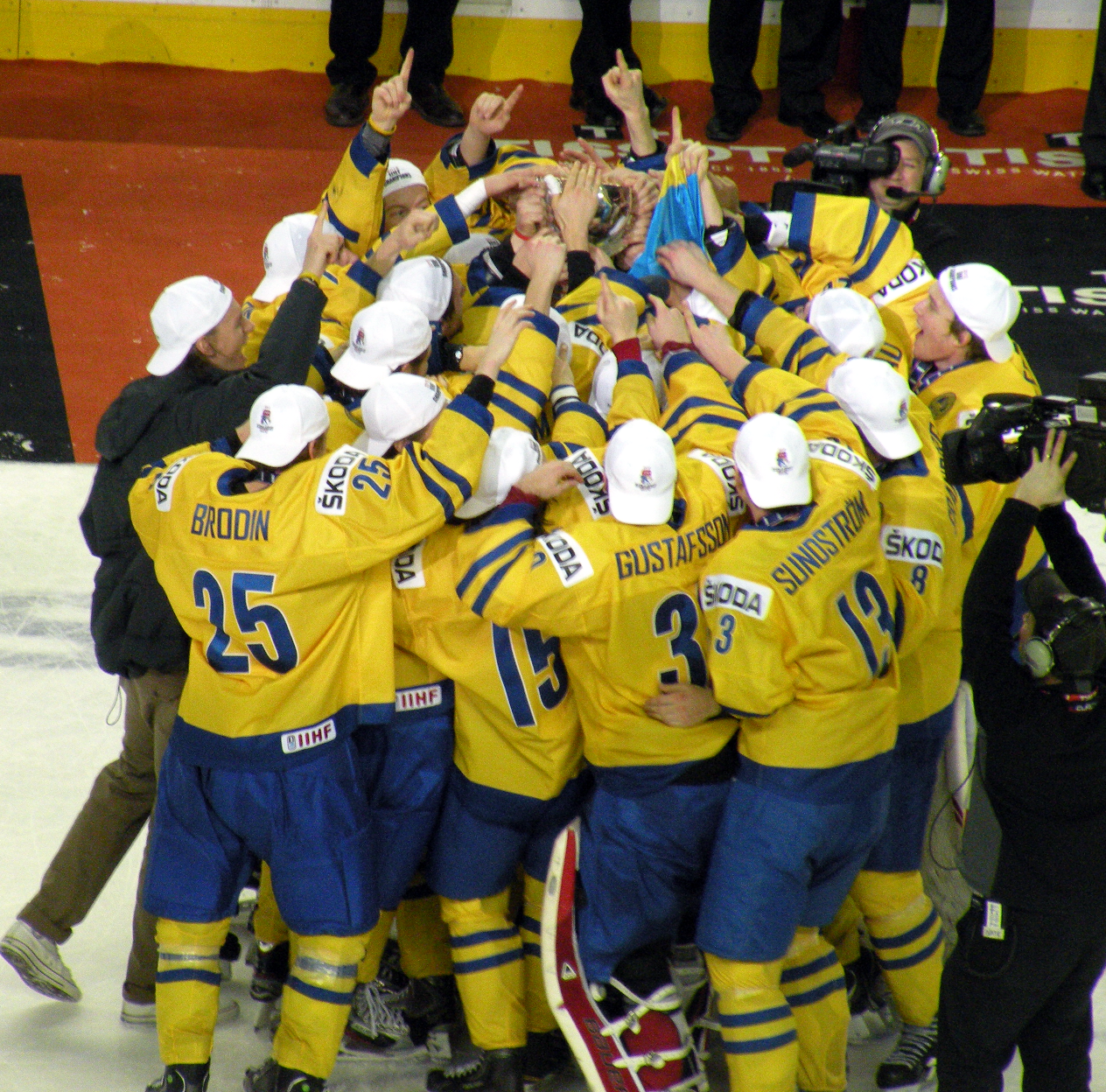
The Swedish team celebrates after defeating Russia in overtime to win the 2012 World Junior Ice Hockey Championships.

The Swedish men's national under 20 ice hockey team, or Juniorkronorna (Junior Crowns in Swedish) as it is commonly called in Sweden, is the national under-20 ice hockey team in Sweden. The team represents Sweden at the International Ice Hockey Federation's World Junior Hockey Championship, held annually every December and January, and is affectionately known as The Junior Crowns, referencing the men's national team Three Crowns.

Sweden's roster for the 1981 World Junior Championships when they won gold included players such as Jan Erixon, Patrik and Peter Sundström, Håkan Nordin and Lars Eriksson.

== World Junior Championship record ==
| Year | GP | W | L | T | GF | GA | Pts | Rank |
|---|---|---|---|---|---|---|---|---|
| 1974 | 5 | 2 | 3 | 0 | 32 | 21 | 4 | 4th place |
| 1975 | 5 | 2 | 2 | 1 | 18 | 24 | 5 | Won bronze medal |
| 1976 | 4 | 1 | 3 | 0 | 23 | 17 | 2 | 5th place |
| 1977 | 7 | 3 | 4 | 0 | 28 | 30 | 6 | 5th place |
| 1978 | 7 | 4 | 2 | 1 | 28 | 24 | 9 | Won silver medal |
| 1979 | 6 | 4 | 1 | 1 | 19 | 13 | 8 | Won bronze medal |
| 1980 | 5 | 2 | 2 | 1 | 23 | 15 | 5 | Won bronze medal |
| 1981 | 5 | 4 | 0 | 1 | 25 | 11 | 9 | Won gold medal |
| 1982 | 7 | 4 | 3 | 0 | 42 | 26 | 8 | 5th place |
| 1983 | 7 | 4 | 3 | 0 | 35 | 23 | 8 | 4th place |
| 1984 | 7 | 3 | 4 | 0 | 27 | 28 | 6 | 5th place |
| 1985 | 7 | 3 | 4 | 0 | 32 | 26 | 6 | 5th place |
| 1986 | 7 | 4 | 3 | 0 | 26 | 23 | 8 | 5th place |
| 1987 | 7 | 4 | 2 | 1 | 45 | 11 | 9 | Won bronze medal |
| 1988 | 7 | 3 | 3 | 1 | 36 | 24 | 7 | 5th place |
| 1989 | 7 | 6 | 1 | 0 | 51 | 14 | 12 | Won silver medal |
| 1990 | 7 | 4 | 2 | 1 | 38 | 29 | 9 | 5th place |
| 1991 | 7 | 3 | 4 | 0 | 32 | 29 | 6 | 6th place |
| 1992 | 7 | 5 | 1 | 1 | 41 | 24 | 11 | Won silver medal |
| 1993 | 7 | 6 | 1 | 0 | 53 | 15 | 12 | Won silver medal |
| 1994 | 7 | 6 | 1 | 0 | 35 | 16 | 12 | Won silver medal |
| 1995 | 7 | 4 | 2 | 1 | 35 | 21 | 9 | Won bronze medal |
| 1996 | 7 | 4 | 2 | 1 | 26 | 13 | 9 | Won silver medal |
| 1997 | 5 | 2 | 3 | 0 | 20 | 18 | 4 | 8th place |
| 1998 | 7 | 3 | 4 | 0 | 25 | 13 | 6 | 6th place |
| 1999 | 7 | 4 | 3 | 0 | 30 | 22 | 8 | 4th place |
| 2000 | 7 | 5 | 2 | 0 | 45 | 20 | 10 | 5th place |
| 2001 | 7 | 3 | 4 | 0 | 17 | 13 | 6 | 4th place |
| 2002 | 7 | 3* | 2+ | 2 | 18 | 15 | 8 | 6th place |
| 2003 | 6 | 2 | 4 | 0 | 20 | 25 | 4 | 8th place |
| 2004 | 6 | 3 | 3 | 0 | 21 | 13 | 6 | 7th place |
| 2005 | 6 | 2 | 4+ | 0 | 18 | 25 | 8 | 6th place |
| 2006 | 6 | 4 | 2+ | 0 | 23 | 11 | 8 | 5th place |
| 2007 | 7 | 3 | 4^ | 0 | 19 | 16 | 10 | 4th place |
| 2008 | 6 | 5† | 1+ | 0 | 26 | 13 | 15 | Won silver medal |
| 2009 | 6 | 5 | 1 | 0 | 27 | 11 | 15 | Won silver medal |
| 2010 | 6 | 5 | 1 | 0 | 41 | 15 | 15 | Won bronze medal |
| 2011 | 6 | 4 | 2+ | 0 | 26 | 17 | 12 | 4th place |
| 2012 | 6 | 6††** | 0 | 0 | 30 | 13 | 14 | Won gold medal |
| 2013 | 6 | 5†* | 1 | 0 | 23 | 13 | 13 | Won silver medal |
| 2014 | 7 | 6 | 1+ | 0 | 32 | 11 | 19 | Won silver medal |
| 2015 | 6 | 5 | 1 | 0 | 25 | 13 | 12 | 4th place |
| 2016 | 6 | 5 | 1 | 0 | 26 | 7 | 12 | 4th place |
| 2017 | 7 | 5 | 2+ | 0 | 29 | 16 | 12 | 4th place |
| 2018 | 7 | 6† | 1 | 0 | 28 | 14 | 12 | Won silver medal |
| 2019 | 5 | 4† | 1 | 0 | 16 | 10 | 11 | 5th place |
| 2020 | 7 | 6† | 1+ | 0 | 32 | 15 | 17 | Won bronze medal |
| 2021 | 5 | 2 | 2^ | 0 | 16 | 12 | 7 | 5th place |
| 2022 | 7 | 5 | 2 | 0 | 20 | 10 | 15 | Won bronze medal |
| 2023 | 7 | 4† | 3++ | 0 | 27 | 19 | 13 | 4th place |
| 2024 | 7 | 5* | 2^ | 0 | 27 | 15 | 15 | Won silver medal |
| 2025 | 7 | 5 | 2++ | 0 | 33 | 18 | 17 | 4th place |
| 2026 | 7 | 7* | 0 | 0 | 35 | 16 | 20 | Won gold medal |

† Includes one win in extra time (in the preliminary round)
^ Includes one loss in extra time (in the preliminary round)
* Includes one win in extra time (in the playoff round)
+ Includes one loss in extra time (in the playoff round)
