= 1982 World Junior Ice Hockey Championships =

1982 IIHF World U20 Championship
Tournament details
- Host countries: United States; Canada
- Venues: 15 (in 15 host cities)
- Dates: December 22, 1981 – January 2, 1982
- Teams: 8

Final positions
- Champions: Canada (1st title)
- Runners-up: Czechoslovakia
- Third place: Finland
- Fourth place: Soviet Union

Tournament statistics
- Games played: 28
- Goals scored: 282 (10.07 per game)
- Attendance: 86,941 (3,105 per game)
- Scoring leader: (Finland) Raimo Summanen (16 points)

The 1982 World Junior Ice Hockey Championships (1982 WJHC) was the sixth edition Ice Hockey World Junior Championship and was held from December 22, 1981, until January 2, 1982. The tournament was hosted by the United States in various cities across the state of Minnesota with some games also played in the Canadian provinces of Manitoba and Ontario.

Canada won their first gold medal at the World Juniors, while Czechoslovakia and Finland won silver and bronze, respectively. Meanwhile, the Soviet Union finished fourth, marking the only time they played an entire World Juniors tournament and failed to win a medal (the USSR was disqualified in 1987). The host United States featuring future hall of famers John Vanbiesbrouck, Chris Chelios, and Phil Housley, finished sixth.

== Pool A ==
The 1982 tournament was a round-robin format, with the top three teams winning gold, silver and bronze medals respectively.

=== Final standings ===
Pos	Team	Pld	W	L	D	GF	GA	GD	Pts
1	Canada	7	6	0	1	45	14	+31	13
2	Czechoslovakia	7	5	1	1	44	17	+27	11
3	Finland	7	5	2	0	47	29	+18	10
4	Soviet Union	7	4	3	0	42	25	+17	8
5	Sweden	7	4	3	0	42	26	+16	8
6	United States	7	2	5	0	28	34	−6	4
7	West Germany	7	1	6	0	19	56	−37	2
8	Switzerland	7	0	7	0	15	81	−66	0

Source: Hockey Canada

Switzerland was relegated to Pool B for the 1983 World Junior Ice Hockey Championships.

=== Results ===
December 22, 1981	Finland	1 – 5 (0–3, 1–1, 0–1)	Canada	Winnipeg, Manitoba

December 22, 1981	Sweden	17 – 0 (5–0, 4–0, 8–0)	Switzerland	Kenora, Ontario

December 22, 1981	Soviet Union	12 – 3	West Germany	Duluth

December 22, 1981	United States	4 – 6 (1–4, 2–0, 1–2)	Czechoslovakia	Duluth

December 23, 1981	Canada	3 – 2 (0–1, 1–0, 2–1)	Sweden	Winnipeg, Manitoba

December 23, 1981	Finland	14 – 2	Switzerland	Brandon, Manitoba

December 23, 1981	United States	8 – 1	West Germany	Duluth

December 23, 1981	Soviet Union	2 – 3 (2-2, 0–0, 0–1)	Czechoslovakia	Duluth

December 26, 1981	Soviet Union	0 – 7 (0–2, 0–1, 0–4)	Canada	Winnipeg, Manitoba

21	Shots	36

December 26, 1981	United States	6 – 3 (3–0, 2–2, 1–1)	Switzerland	Grand Rapids

December 26, 1981	Sweden	5 – 1 (1–1, 3–0, 1–0)	West Germany	Brainerd

December 26, 1981	Czechoslovakia	5 – 1 (2–0, 2–0, 1–1)	Finland	Virginia

December 27, 1981	United States	4 – 5 (2–0, 1–4, 1–1)	Canada	Bloomington

December 27, 1981	Sweden	6 – 4 (1–2, 5–0, 0–2)	Czechoslovakia	Bloomington

December 27, 1981	Soviet Union	11 – 4	Switzerland	International Falls

December 27, 1981	West Germany	4 – 8	Finland	St. Cloud

December 29, 1981	Canada	11 – 3 (4–0, 4–2, 3–1)	West Germany	Bloomington

December 29, 1981	Czechoslovakia	16 – 0 (7–0, 5–0, 4–0)	Switzerland	Bloomington

December 29, 1981	United States	0 – 7 (0–5, 0–1, 0–1)	Soviet Union	Bloomington

December 30, 1981	Sweden	6 – 9 (1–3, 2–2, 3–4)	Finland	Burnsville

December 31, 1981	West Germany	1 – 7 (0–3, 1–1, 0–3)	Czechoslovakia	New Ulm

December 31, 1981	Finland	6 – 3 (0–1, 4–1, 2–1)	Soviet Union	Bloomington

December 31, 1981	United States	2 – 4 (0–3, 1–1, 1–0)	Sweden	Bloomington

January 1, 1982	Canada	11 – 1 (4–0, 3–1, 4–0)	Switzerland	Minneapolis

January 2, 1982	West Germany	6 – 5 (3–2, 0–2, 3–1)	Switzerland	Mankato

January 2, 1982	Sweden	2 – 7 (0–0, 0–4, 2–3)	Soviet Union	Bloomington

January 2, 1982	United States	4 – 8	Finland	Bloomington

January 2, 1982	Canada	3 – 3 (1–1, 0–1, 2–1)	Czechoslovakia	Rochester

=== Scoring leaders ===
Rank	Player	Country	G	A	Pts
1	Raimo Summanen	Finland	7	9	16
2	Petri Skriko	Finland	8	7	15
3	Risto Jalo	Finland	7	8	15
4	Mike Moller	Canada	5	9	14
5	Anatoli Semenov	Soviet Union	5	8	13
6	Marc Habscheid	Canada	6	6	12
7	Scott Arniel	Canada	5	6	11
8	Bruce Eakin	Canada	4	7	11
9	Oleg Starkov	Soviet Union	3	8	11
10	Magnus Roupé	Sweden	7	3	10

=== Tournament awards ===
	IIHF Directorate Awards	Media All-Star Team
Goaltender	(Canada) Mike Moffat	(Canada) Mike Moffat
Defencemen	(Canada) Gord Kluzak	(Canada) Gord Kluzak (Soviet Union) Ilya Byakin
Forwards	(Finland) Petri Skriko	(Finland) Petri Skriko (Czechoslovakia) Vladimír Růžička (Canada) Mike Moller

== Pool B ==
Pool B was played on March 16–20, in Heerenveen in the Netherlands. Two groups of four played round robins, with placement games pitting the respective finishers against each other. Japan made their debut, replacing absent Poland.

=== Preliminary round ===
==== Group A ====
Team	Pld	W	L	D	GF	GA	GD	Pts
Austria	3	3	0	0	19	10	+9	6
Denmark	3	2	1	0	18	12	+6	4
France	3	1	2	0	12	14	−2	2
Yugoslavia	3	0	3	0	9	22	−13	0

Denmark	7 – 3	Yugoslavia	Heerenveen

Austria	4 – 3	France	Heerenveen

Austria	9 – 5	Yugoslavia	Heerenveen

Denmark	9 – 3	France	Heerenveen

Austria	6 – 2	Denmark	Heerenveen

France	6 – 1	Yugoslavia	Heerenveen

==== Group B ====
Team	Pld	W	L	D	GF	GA	GD	Pts
Norway	3	3	0	0	15	6	+9	6
Japan	3	2	1	0	16	8	+8	4
Italy	3	0	2	1	6	13	−7	1
Netherlands	3	0	2	1	6	16	−10	1

Norway	4 – 2	Japan	Heerenveen

Netherlands	2 – 2	Italy	Heerenveen

Norway	6 – 2	Italy	Heerenveen

Japan	9 – 2	Netherlands	Heerenveen

Japan	5 – 2	Italy	Heerenveen

Norway	5 – 2	Netherlands	Heerenveen

=== Final round ===
==== 7th place game ====
Netherlands	6 – 3 (2–2, 2–0, 3–1)	Yugoslavia	Heerenveen

==== 5th place game ====
France	6 – 2 (3–0, 1–1, 2–1)	Italy	Heerenveen

==== 3rd place game ====
Japan	6 – 4 (2–2, 2–2, 2–0)	Denmark	Heerenveen

==== 1st place game ====
Norway	3 – 2 (2–1, 1–1, 0–0)	Austria	Heerenveen

Norway was promoted to Pool A for the 1983 World Junior Ice Hockey Championships.

=== Scoring leaders ===
Rank	Player	Country	G	A	Pts
1	Wolfgang Kocher	Austria	7	2	9
2	Erik Lodberg	Denmark	6	0	6
3	Jean-Francois Beaudoing	France	4	2	6
3	Motoki Ebina	Japan	4	2	6
3	Finn Juhl	Denmark	4	2	6
6	Franck Ganis	France	3	3	6
6	Toshiyuki Sakai	Japan	3	3	6
6	Herbert Keckeis	Austria	3	3	6
9	Milos Piperski	Yugoslavia	5	0	5
