= Greece men's national junior ice hockey team =

Greece
- Association: Greek Ice Hockey
- IIHF code: GRE

First international
- Yugoslavia 33 - 1 Greece (Belgrade, Yugoslavia; December 27, 1990)

Biggest defeat
- Latvia 47 - 1 Greece (Riga, Latvia; November 10, 1992)

IIHF World Junior Championship
- Appearances: 2 (first in 1991)
- Best result: 24th (1991)

International record (W–L–T)
- 0-11-0

The Greek men's national under 20 ice hockey team is the national under-20 ice hockey team in Greece. They played in two World Junior Championships in 1991 and 1992, as well as the qualification tournament for 1993. They have not officially participated since 1993 then.

== History ==
The junior national team of Greece was formed in 1990 and played its first international competition in the World Junior Championships held in Yugoslavia. They lost their first game 33–1 against Yugoslavia on December 27, 1990. They continued their losing streak with a 22–1 loss to Bulgaria. Throughout the rest of the 1991 World Junior Ice Hockey Championships, the Greeks lost five more games including a 22–0 shutout against Great Britain by a combined score of 103–2.

The opening of the 1992 World Junior Ice Hockey Championships was much more promising. Their first game was a 7-0 loss to South Korea. However, following their second loss of the tournament it was discovered that they had used an ineligible player, and they were forced to forfeit.

Their worst defeat came in the qualification tournament, for Pool C, of the 1993 World Junior Ice Hockey Championships. Against Latvia, in their first game, they lost 47–1. The 46 goal difference was the largest in their history. Greece went on to be outscored 85–3 in their final three games of the tournament.

Following the Greek national team's bronze medal at the World Championships in the 1992 Pool C2 in South Africa, the sport suffered a decline in support from the people of Greece. Despite this, they fielded an under-18 junior team that ended up winning one game and losing four at the European Championships in Bulgaria, in 1996. This team is not officially recognized as participating at that tournament because they did not have the required minimum number of players.

As of 2010, there are currently 76 players playing junior hockey in Greece. In IIHF competitions, Greece has a current record of 0–11–0.

== International competitions ==
- 1991 World Junior Ice Hockey Championships – 24th place (8th in Pool C)
- 1992 World Junior Ice Hockey Championships – Disqualified
- 1993 World Junior Ice Hockey Championships – 32nd place (9th in Pool C Qualification)
