= Michael Nylander =

Swedish ice hockey player

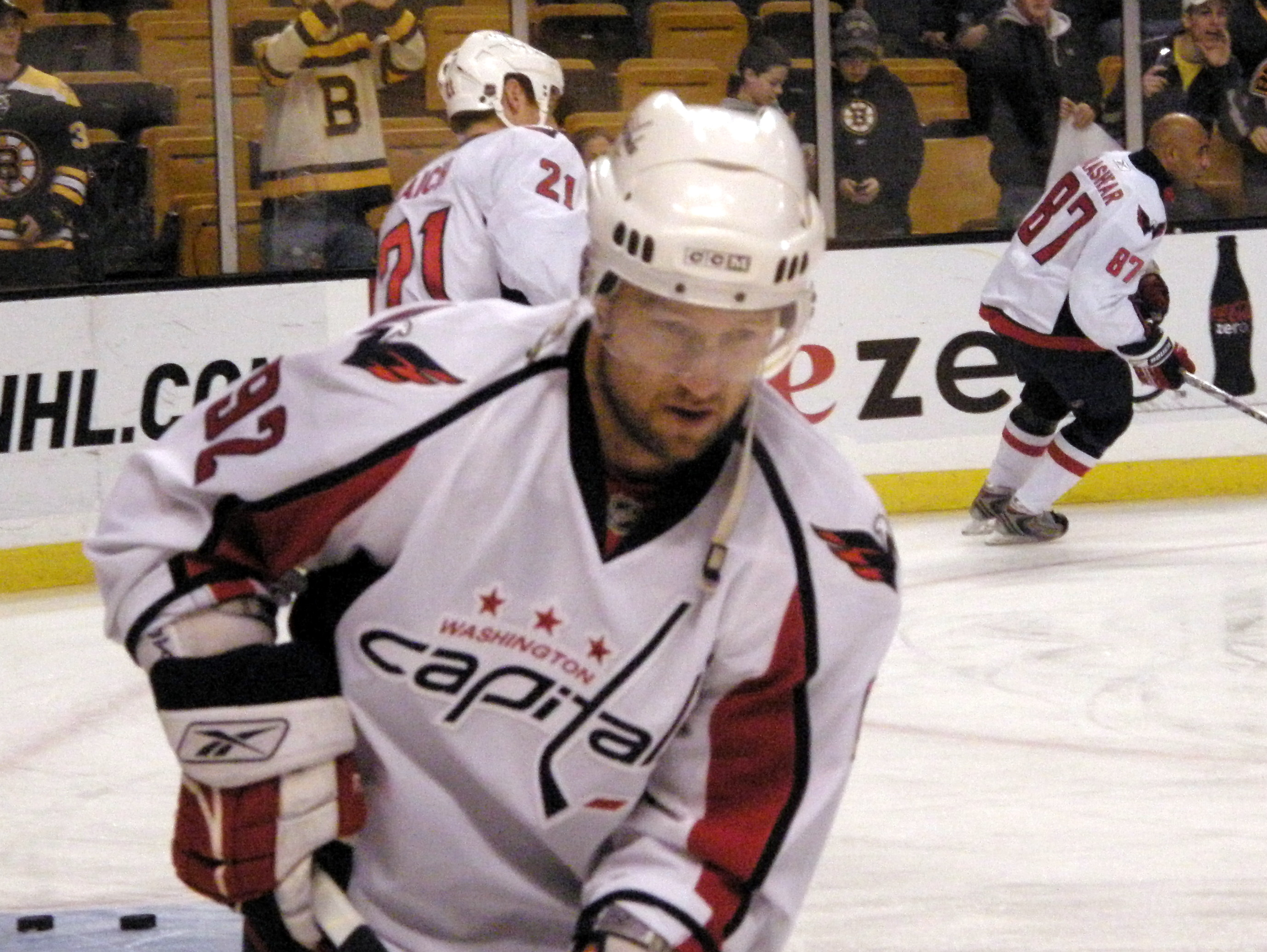
- Nylander with the Washington Capitals in 2009
- Born: 3 October 1972 (age 54) Stockholm, Sweden
- Height: 6 ft 0 in (183 cm)
- Weight: 194 lb (88 kg; 13 st 12 lb)
- Position: Centre
- Shot: Left
- Played for: AIK IF; Hartford Whalers; Calgary Flames; JYP Jyväskylä; HC Lugano; Tampa Bay Lightning; Chicago Blackhawks; Washington Capitals; Boston Bruins; Oulun Kärpät; SKA Saint Petersburg; Ak Bars Kazan; New York Rangers; Jokerit; ZSC Lions; EHC Kloten; HC Bolzano
- National team: Sweden
- NHL draft: 59th overall, 1991; Hartford Whalers
- Playing career: 1988–2015

Michael Gunnar Nylander (born 3 October 1972) is a Swedish former professional ice hockey centre and coach. He played for fifteen seasons in the National Hockey League (NHL), and represented the Swedish national team in multiple Olympics and World Championships.

== Playing career ==
Nylander was drafted by the Hartford Whalers in the third round (59th overall) in the 1991 NHL entry draft. In the NHL, he has played for the Hartford Whalers (1992–1994), Calgary Flames (1994–98), Tampa Bay Lightning (1999), Chicago Blackhawks (1999–2002), Washington Capitals (2002–03), and Boston Bruins (2004), New York Rangers (2005–07), and Washington Capitals (2007–09).

Nylander scored his first career NHL goal against Réjean Lemelin on 27 November 1992 in his 16th game at Boston Garden in a 5–4 Whalers loss. The following season, although he was third in scoring for the Whalers at that time, he was sent down to their AHL affiliate Springfield Indians due to repeated defensive lapses.

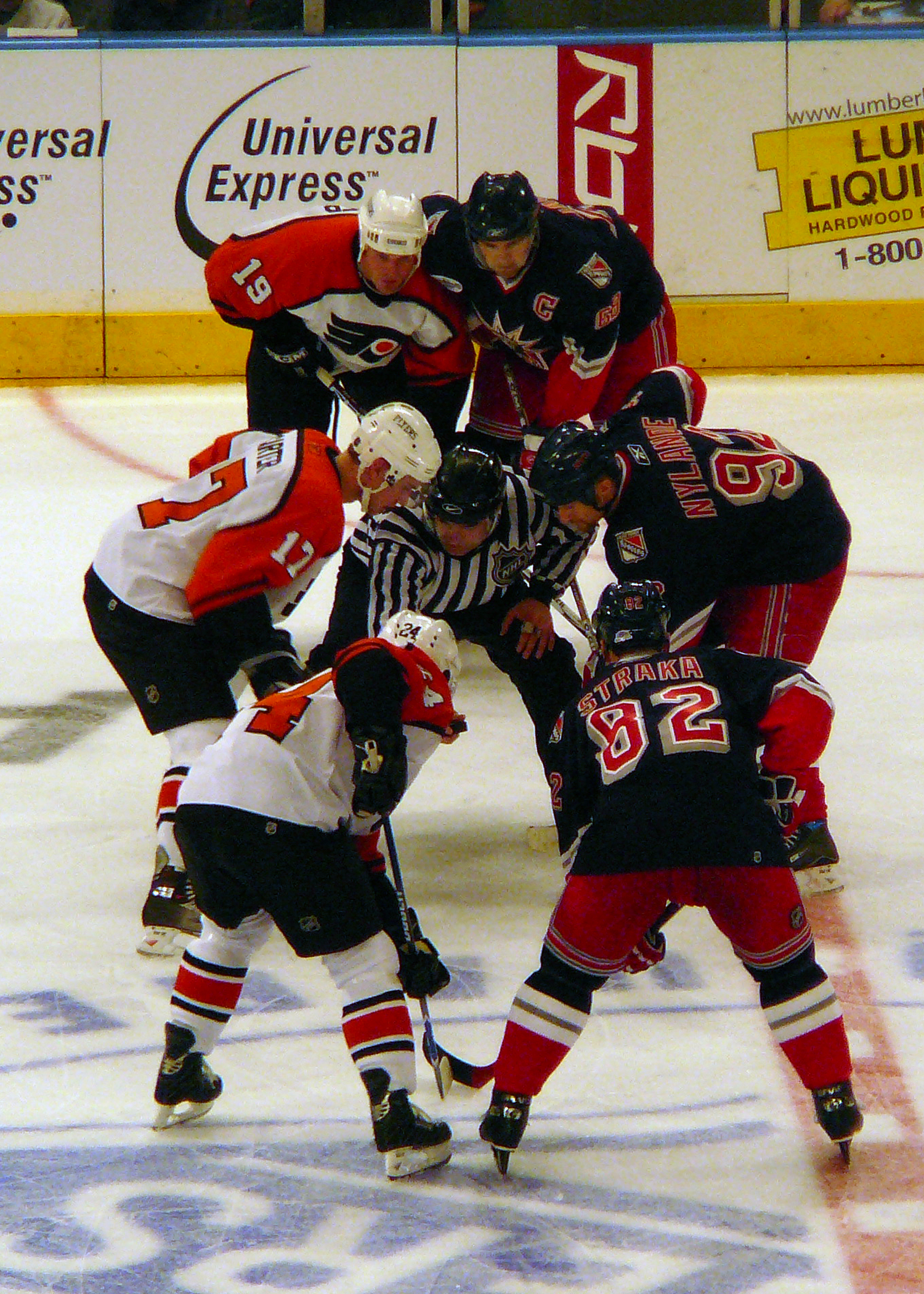
Michael Nylander with the New York Rangers (second row, far right) faces off against the Philadelphia Flyers on 4 January 2007

Nylander was signed by the New York Rangers for the 2005–06 season, playing frequently with right-winger Jaromír Jágr. He centered the first line and first power play unit and helped the Rangers reach 100 points for the first time since 1994.

Following their 4–3 overtime victory over the Boston Bruins on 8 April 2006, Nylander was interviewed by NBC's Pierre McGuire. He dropped the word "shit" on live television when speaking about his relationship with Pierre McGuire back in Hartford. Bill Clement mentioned there was no 5-second delay, however Clement and the rest of the NBC crew did issue an immediate apology. Nylander scored the game-winning goal in overtime. The National Hockey League and the Federal Communications Commission never made a decision on this situation.

Prior to the 2007–08 season Nylander's agent had agreed to a contract with the Oilers. While expecting to receive a signed contract, the Oilers instead found out that he had signed with the Washington Capitals.

Nylander tore his rotator cuff during a faceoff against the Florida Panthers on 1 December 2007 and missed the next four games before returning to play the next thirteen games. Eventually, Nylander was forced to have surgery to repair the tear on 16 January 2008, and missed the rest of the 2007–08 season and playoffs.

In the 2008–09 season, still feeling the effects of his torn rotator cuff, Nylander scored only 33 points in 72 games.

The following season the Washington Capitals faced salary cap restraints. Looking to move salary, they attempted to trade Michael Nylander, but found no suitors for his 5 million dollar salary. The Capitals first loaned Nylander to the Detroit Red Wings organization (who then assigned him to the Grand Rapids Griffins of the American Hockey League) and then later to Jokerit of SM-liiga where he finished the 2009–10 hockey season. For the 2010–11 season, Nylander played in the Florida Panthers organization's AHL affiliate in Rochester. His NHL rights remained owned by the Capitals through the end of the season.

On 23 October 2010, Nylander was seriously injured when he was hit from behind by Brendan Smith during the second period of a game between Rochester and the Grand Rapids Griffins. He underwent successful spinal fusion surgery on 26 October 2010 at Strong Memorial Hospital in Rochester. Doctors cleared him to play again after six months of recovery.

On 17 August 2011, Nylander signed a tryout contract with the Philadelphia Flyers, joining the team's training camp. He was released on 25 September 2011.

Nylander played for the ZSC Lions in the National League A from October 2011 to December 2011. His contract was not renewed and in January 2012 he signed with the Kloten Flyers. He officially retired from professional hockey in 2015. In 2016, he was an assistant coach with the Mississauga Steelheads of the Ontario Hockey League.

== International play ==
Medal record

Representing Sweden

Ice hockey

World Championships
Gold medal – first place	1992 Czechoslovakia	
Gold medal – first place	2006 Latvia	
Silver medal – second place	1993 Germany	
Silver medal – second place	1997 Finland	
Silver medal – second place	2004 Czech Republic	
Bronze medal – third place	1999 Norway	
Bronze medal – third place	2002 Sweden	
Bronze medal – third place	2010 Germany	

World Junior Championships
Silver medal – second place	1992 Germany	

European Junior Championship
Silver medal – second place	1990 Sweden	

Nylander represented Sweden a record 13 times, including the World Cup and the Winter Olympics. He played for the national squad for nearly twenty years from the 1991 World Juniors to the 2010 World Championship, winning nine medals in the process.

== Personal life ==
Nylander and his wife, Camilla Altelius have five children together:William (born 1996), Alexander (born 1998), Jacqueline (born 2000), Stephanie (born 2003), and Daniella (born 2006). William was drafted in 2014 by the Toronto Maple Leafs as the 8th overall pick, while Alexander was also drafted 8th overall by the Buffalo Sabres in the 2016 NHL entry draft. As of 2025, Alexander plays for the Toronto Maple Leafs organization. Jacqueline is an aspiring professional tennis player, competing in the WTA circuit as well as collegiately at Southern Methodist University.

Nylander has two brothers, Peter and Thommy.

== Career statistics ==
=== Regular season and playoffs ===
			Regular season					Playoffs
Season	Team	League	GP	G	A	Pts	PIM	GP	G	A	Pts	PIM
1987–88	RA 73	SWE-2	3	0	0	0	0	—	—	—	—	—
1988–89	Huddinge IK	SWE U20	—	—	—	—	—	—	—	—	—	—
1989–90	Huddinge IK	SWE-2	31	7	15	22	4	5	3	0	3	0
1990–91	Huddinge IK	SWE-2	33	14	20	34	10	2	0	0	0	0
1991–92	AIK	SEL	40	11	17	28	30	3	1	4	5	4
1992–93	Hartford Whalers	NHL	59	11	22	33	36	—	—	—	—	—
1992–93	Springfield Indians	AHL	—	—	—	—	—	3	3	3	6	2
1993–94	Hartford Whalers	NHL	58	11	33	44	24	—	—	—	—	—
1993–94	Springfield Indians	AHL	4	0	9	9	0	—	—	—	—	—
1993–94	Calgary Flames	NHL	15	2	9	11	6	3	0	0	0	0
1994–95	JYP	SM-l	16	11	19	30	63	—	—	—	—	—
1994–95	Calgary Flames	NHL	6	0	1	1	2	6	0	6	6	2
1995–96	Calgary Flames	NHL	73	13	38	51	20	4	0	0	0	0
1996–97	HC Lugano	NDA	36	12	43	55	28	8	3	8	11	8
1997–98	Calgary Flames	NHL	65	13	23	36	24	—	—	—	—	—
1998–99	Calgary Flames	NHL	9	2	3	5	2	—	—	—	—	—
1998–99	Tampa Bay Lightning	NHL	24	2	7	9	6	—	—	—	—	—
1999–00	Tampa Bay Lightning	NHL	11	1	2	3	4	—	—	—	—	—
1999–00	Chicago Blackhawks	NHL	66	23	28	51	26	—	—	—	—	—
2000–01	Chicago Blackhawks	NHL	82	25	39	64	32	—	—	—	—	—
2001–02	Chicago Blackhawks	NHL	82	15	46	61	50	5	0	3	3	2
2002–03	Chicago Blackhawks	NHL	9	0	4	4	4	—	—	—	—	—
2002–03	Washington Capitals	NHL	71	17	39	56	36	6	3	2	5	8
2003–04	Washington Capitals	NHL	3	0	2	2	8	—	—	—	—	—
2003–04	Boston Bruins	NHL	15	1	11	12	14	6	3	3	6	0
2004–05	Kärpät	SM-l	23	5	15	20	22	—	—	—	—	—
2004–05	SKA Saint Petersburg	RSL	8	2	5	7	0	—	—	—	—	—
2004–05	Ak Bars Kazan	RSL	5	0	1	1	2	—	—	—	—	—
2005–06	New York Rangers	NHL	81	23	56	79	76	4	0	1	1	0
2006–07	New York Rangers	NHL	79	26	57	83	42	10	6	7	13	0
2007–08	Washington Capitals	NHL	40	11	26	37	24	—	—	—	—	—
2008–09	Washington Capitals	NHL	72	9	24	33	32	3	0	0	0	2
2009–10	Grand Rapids Griffins	AHL	24	2	16	18	14	—	—	—	—	—
2009–10	Jokerit	SM-l	14	3	4	7	58	3	2	1	3	0
2010–11	Rochester Americans	AHL	7	4	2	6	8	—	—	—	—	—
2011–12	ZSC Lions	NLA	15	5	5	10	8	—	—	—	—	—
2011–12	Kloten Flyers	NLA	8	0	5	5	4	2	0	1	1	2
2012–13	HC Vita Hästen	SWE-3	1	0	0	0	0	—	—	—	—	—
2012–13	HC Bolzano	ITA	1	0	0	0	0	—	—	—	—	—
2012–13	Södertälje SK	SWE-2	18	5	14	19	4	10	3	4	7	20
2013–14	Rögle BK	SWE-2	25	3	6	9	22	—	—	—	—	—
2013–14	HC Vita Hästen	SWE-3	1	1	1	2	0	—	—	—	—	—
2013–14	AIK	SHL	8	0	1	1	4	—	—	—	—	—
2014–15	AIK	SWE-2	11	1	1	2	8	—	—	—	—	—
NHL totals			920	209	470	679	468	47	12	22	34	14

=== International ===
Year	Team	Event	GP	G	A	Pts	PIM
1990	Sweden	EJC	6	2	4	6	0
1991	Sweden	WJC	7	6	5	11	8
1992	Sweden	WJC	7	8	9	17	6
1992	Sweden	WC	8	0	1	1	0
1993	Sweden	WC	7	1	7	8	4
1996	Sweden	WCH	4	2	1	3	0
1996	Sweden	WC	3	2	3	5	0
1997	Sweden	WC	11	6	5	11	6
1998	Sweden	OG	4	0	0	0	6
1999	Sweden	WC	10	2	4	6	8
2000	Sweden	WC	7	1	5	6	6
2002	Sweden	OG	4	1	2	3	0
2002	Sweden	WC	8	1	6	7	0
2004	Sweden	WC	7	2	4	6	8
2006	Sweden	WC	6	1	8	9	4
2010	Sweden	WC	8	1	2	3	4
Junior totals			20	16	18	34	14
Senior totals			87	20	48	68	46

== Awards ==
- Silver medal World Junior Championship in 1992.
- World Junior Championship's Best Forward in 1992.
- Named to the World Junior Championship All-Star Team in 1992.
- Elitserien Rookie of the Year in 1992.
- Gold medal World Championship in 1992 and 2006.
- Silver medal World Championship in 1993, 1997 and 2004.
- Named to the World Championship All-Star Team in 1997.
- World Championship's Best Forward in 1997.
- Bronze medal World Championship in 1999, 2002 and 2010.

== Records ==
- 1993 World Championship record of most assists
