= German Volgin =

Soviet ice hockey player

- Born: 17 March 1963 Cherepovets, Soviet Union
- Died: 28 July 2014 (aged 51)
- Height: 5 ft 11 in (180 cm)
- Weight: 185 lb (84 kg; 13 st 3 lb)
- Position: Right wing
- Shot: Left
- Played for: Dinamo Riga; HC Spartak Moscow; HC Dynamo Moscow; Severstal Cherepovets
- NHL draft: Undrafted
- Playing career: 1980–1999

German Yuryevich Volgin (Russian: Герман Юрьевич Волгин; 17 March 1963 – 28 July 2014) was a Russian professional ice hockey winger who played in the Soviet Hockey League. He was a member of the HC Spartak Moscow, Dynamo Riga, and HC Dynamo Moscow.
