= 1995 World Junior Ice Hockey Championships =

1995 edition of the World Junior Ice Hockey Championships

1995 IIHF World U20 Championship

Tournament details
- Host country: Canada
- Venues: 13 (in 13 host cities)
- Dates: December 26, 1994 – January 4, 1995
- Teams: 8

Final positions
- Champions: Canada (8th title)
- Runners-up: Russia
- Third place: Sweden
- Fourth place: Finland

Tournament statistics
- Games played: 28
- Goals scored: 249 (8.89 per game)
- Scoring leader: (Canada) Marty Murray (15 points)

The 1995 World Junior Ice Hockey Championships (1995 WJHC) was the 19th edition of the Ice Hockey World Junior Championship and was hosted in Red Deer, Alberta, Canada with games held throughout central Alberta. The host Canadians won their third straight gold medal, and its eighth overall, while Russia won silver, and Sweden the bronze.

== Final standings ==
The 1995 tournament was a round-robin format, with the top three teams winning gold, silver and bronze medals respectively. It was the last tournament, to use this round-robin format.

Pos	Team	Pld	W	L	D	GF	GA	GD	Pts
1	Canada	7	7	0	0	49	22	+27	14
2	Russia	7	5	2	0	36	24	+12	10
3	Sweden	7	4	2	1	35	21	+14	9
4	Finland	7	3	3	1	29	26	+3	7
5	United States	7	3	4	0	28	33	−5	6
6	Czech Republic	7	3	4	0	43	26	+17	6
7	Germany	7	1	6	0	17	55	−38	2
8	Ukraine	7	1	6	0	12	42	−30	2

Source: Hockey Canada

No team was relegated to Pool B as the tournament expanded to ten teams for 1996.

== Results ==
December 26, 1994	Canada	7 – 1	Ukraine	Red Deer

December 26, 1994	Sweden	10 – 2	Germany	Leduc

December 26, 1994	Czech Republic	3 – 0	Finland	Spruce Grove

December 26, 1994	United States	4 – 3	Russia	Innisfail

December 27, 1994	Canada	9 – 1	Germany	Red Deer

December 27, 1994	Russia	4 – 3	Czech Republic	Stettler

December 27, 1994	Finland	6 – 2	Ukraine	Rocky Mountain House

December 27, 1994	Sweden	4 – 2	United States	Red Deer

December 29, 1994	Canada	8 – 3	United States	Red Deer

December 29, 1994	Sweden	4 – 3	Czech Republic	Red Deer

December 29, 1994	Russia	4 – 2	Ukraine	Edmonton

December 29, 1994	Finland	7 – 1	Germany	Wetaskiwin

December 30, 1994	Canada	7 – 5	Czech Republic	Calgary

December 30, 1994	Sweden	7 – 1	Ukraine	Sherwood Park

December 30, 1994	Russia	8 – 1	Germany	Lacombe

December 30, 1994	Finland	7 – 5	United States	Red Deer

January 1, 1995	Canada	6 – 4	Finland	Edmonton

January 1, 1995	Russia	6 – 4	Sweden	Calgary

January 1, 1995	Czech Republic	10 – 1	Ukraine	Red Deer

January 1, 1995	United States	5 – 3	Germany	Edmonton

January 2, 1995	Canada	8 – 5	Russia	Red Deer

January 2, 1995	Finland	3 – 3	Sweden	Calgary

January 2, 1995	Czech Republic	14 – 3	Germany	Red Deer

January 2, 1995	Ukraine	3 – 2	United States	Camrose

January 4, 1995	Canada	4 – 3	Sweden	Red Deer

January 4, 1995	Russia	6 – 2	Finland	Red Deer

January 4, 1995	Germany	6 – 2	Ukraine	Stettler

January 4, 1995	United States	7 – 5	Czech Republic	Ponoka

=== Scoring leaders ===
Rank	Player	Country	G	A	Pts
1	Marty Murray	Canada	6	9	15
2	Jason Allison	Canada	3	12	15
3	Bryan McCabe	Canada	3	9	12
4	Alexander Serikow	Germany	2	9	11
5	Éric Dazé	Canada	8	2	10
5	Alexander Korolyuk	Russia	8	2	10
7	Adam Deadmarsh	United States	6	4	10
7	Václav Varaďa	Czech Republic	6	4	10
9	Josef Marha	Czech Republic	5	5	10
10	Vadim Sharifyanov	Russia	4	6	10

=== Tournament awards ===
	IIHF Directorate Awards	Media All-Star Team
Goaltender	(Russia) Yevgeni Tarasov	(Ukraine) Igor Karpenko
Defencemen	(Canada) Bryan McCabe	(Canada) Bryan McCabe (Sweden) Anders Eriksson
Forwards	(Canada) Marty Murray	(Canada) Jason Allison (Canada) Éric Dazé (Canada) Marty Murray

== Pool B ==
Eight teams contested the second tier this year in Caen, Rouen, Le Havre, and Louviers France from December 27 to January 5. It was played in a simple round robin format, each team playing seven games. Two teams were promoted, no team was relegated because of the expansion of the top tier.

Standings

Pos	Team	Pld	W	L	D	GF	GA	GD	Pts	Switzerland men's national junior ice hockey team	Slovakia men's national junior ice hockey team	Poland men's national junior ice hockey team	France men's national junior ice hockey team	Norway men's national junior ice hockey team	Austria men's national junior ice hockey team	Japan men's national junior ice hockey team	Italy men's national junior ice hockey team
1	Switzerland	7	5	0	2	40	12	+28	12		3–1	4–4	4–1	4–4	6–1	11–1	8–0
2	Slovakia	7	5	2	0	33	16	+17	10	1–3		4–2	6–1	4–1	8–2	7–3	3–4
3	Poland	7	4	2	1	26	22	+4	9	4–4	2–4		0–6	5–4	4–1	6–0	5–3
4	France	7	4	3	0	24	15	+9	8	1–4	1–6	6–0		1–2	3–0	6–3	6–0
5	Norway	7	3	3	1	27	26	+1	7	4–4	1–4	4–5	2–1		2–7	9–1	5–4
6	Austria	7	2	4	1	20	31	−11	5	1–6	2–8	1–4	0–3	7–2		4–4	5–4
7	Japan	7	1	5	1	17	44	−27	3	1–11	3–7	0–6	3–6	1–9	4–4		5–1
8	Italy	7	1	6	0	16	37	−21	2	0–8	4–3	3–5	0–6	4–5	4–5	1–5	

Legend: Blue = home team win; Red = away team win; Yellow = draw.

Switzerland and Slovakia were promoted to Pool A for 1996.

== Qualification for Pool C1 ==
This would be the final year for a pre-tournament qualification. The winner of this tournament would participate in the C1 pool, second and third would participate in C2. It was played from September 3 to 5, in Minsk, Belarus.

Team	Pld	W	L	D	GF	GA	GD	Pts	Belarus men's national junior ice hockey team	Kazakhstan men's national junior ice hockey team	Slovenia men's national junior ice hockey team
Belarus	2	2	0	0	13	5	+8	4		8–4	5–1
Kazakhstan	2	1	1	0	15	8	+7	2	4–8		11–0
Slovenia	2	0	2	0	1	16	−15	0	1–5	0–11	

Legend: Blue = home team win; Red = away team win; Yellow = draw.

== Pool C1 ==
Eight teams were divided into two round robin groups, with placement games to follow (1st played 1st, etc.). Because there were to be two teams promoted, each group winner secured promotion before the placement games. The tournament took place from December 29 to January 3, in Puigcerda Spain.

=== Preliminary round ===
Group A

Team	Pld	W	L	D	GF	GA	GD	Pts	Hungary men's national junior ice hockey team	Belarus men's national junior ice hockey team	Romania men's national junior ice hockey team	Great Britain men's national junior ice hockey team
Hungary	3	3	0	0	22	3	+19	6		5–2	11–0	6–1
Belarus	3	2	1	0	13	9	+4	4	2–5		3–2	8–2
Romania	3	1	2	0	6	17	−11	2	0–11	2–3		4–3
Great Britain	3	0	3	0	6	18	−12	0	1–6	2–8	3–4	

Legend: Blue = home team win; Red = away team win; Yellow = draw.

Hungary was promoted to Pool B for 1996.

Group B

Team	Pld	W	L	D	GF	GA	GD	Pts	Latvia men's national junior ice hockey team	Denmark men's national junior ice hockey team	Spain men's national junior ice hockey team	Netherlands men's national junior ice hockey team
Latvia	3	3	0	0	29	6	+23	6		7–5	9–0	13–1
Denmark	3	2	1	0	15	11	+4	4	5–7		5–2	5–2
Spain	3	1	2	0	6	17	−11	2	0–9	2–5		4–3
Netherlands	3	0	3	0	6	22	−16	0	1–13	2–5	3–4	

Legend: Blue = home team win; Red = away team win; Yellow = draw.

Latvia was promoted to Pool B for 1996.

=== Placement Games ===
- 7th place:Netherlands 4 - 3(ot) Great Britain
- 5th place:Spain 3 - 2 Romania
- 3rd place:Denmark 3 - 2 Belarus
- 1st Place:Latvia 5 - 2 Hungary

== Pool C2 ==
Six teams played a round robin, with the top two gain promotion for the following year's Pool C, the remaining teams would be placed in Pool D. It was played from December 31 to January 6, in Tallinn Estonia.

Standings

Pos	Team	Pld	W	L	D	GF	GA	GD	Pts	Kazakhstan men's national junior ice hockey team	Slovenia men's national junior ice hockey team	Estonia men's national junior ice hockey team	Lithuania men's national junior ice hockey team	Croatia men's national junior ice hockey team	Serbia and Montenegro men's national junior ice hockey team
1	Kazakhstan	5	3	0	2	47	10	+37	8		3–3	13–1	11–2	2–2	18–2
2	Slovenia	5	3	0	2	40	15	+25	8	3–3		3–3	9–3	8–2	17–4
3	Estonia	5	2	1	2	24	25	−1	6	1–13	3–3		6–4	2–2	12–3
4	Lithuania	5	2	3	0	29	30	−1	4	2–11	3–9	4–6		7–2	13–2
5	Croatia	5	0	2	3	10	21	−11	3	2–2	2–8	2–2	2–7		2–2
6	FR Yugoslavia	5	0	4	1	13	62	−49	1	2–18	4–17	3–12	2–13	2–2	

Legend: Blue = home team win; Red = away team win; Yellow = draw.

Kazakhstan and Slovenia were promoted to Pool C for 1996.
