= Germany men's national junior ice hockey team =

Germany
- Association: Deutscher Eishockey-Bund
- General manager: (Germany) Michael Pfuhl
- Head coach: (Germany) Ernst Höfner
- Assistants: (Germany) Klaus Merk
- Captain: Stephan Kronthaler
- Most points: Tobias Rieder
- IIHF code: GER

First international
- Germany 9–1 Romania (Tychy or Oswiecim, Poland; December 27, 1990)

Biggest win
- Germany 11–0 Poland (Bad Tölz, Germany; December 10, 2007)

Biggest defeat
- Canada 18–2 West Germany (Kitchener, Ontario, Canada; December 27, 1985); Canada 16–2 Germany (Edmonton, Alberta, Canada; December 26, 2020)

IIHF World Junior Championship
- Appearances: 50 (first in 1977)
- Best result: 5th (1981)

International record (W–L–T)
- 108-180-8

The German men's national under 20 ice hockey team is the national under-20 ice hockey team in Germany. The team represents Germany at the International Ice Hockey Federation's IIHF World Junior Championship.

== History ==
Year	Division	Rank
(Czechoslovakia) 1977	Top	6th
(Canada) 1978	Top	7th
(Sweden) 1979	Top	7th
(Finland) 1980	Top	6th
(West Germany) 1981	Top	5th
(Canada) / (United States) 1982	Top	7th
(Soviet Union) 1983	Top	7th
(Sweden) 1984	Top	7th
(Finland) 1985	Top	7th
(Canada) 1986	Top	8th
(France) 1987	Pool B	1st (9th overall)
(Soviet Union) 1988	Top	7th
(United States) 1989	Top	8th
(West Germany) 1990	Pool B	2nd (10th overall)
(Poland) 1991	Pool B	1st (9th overall)
(Germany) 1992	Top	7th
(Sweden) 1993	Top	7th
(Czech Republic) 1994	Top	7th
(Canada) 1995	Top	7th
(United States) 1996	Top	8th
(Switzerland) 1997	Top	9th
(Finland) 1998	Top	10th
(Hungary) 1999	Pool B	4th (14th overall)
(Belarus) 2000	Pool B	2nd (12th overall)
(Germany) 2001	Division I	2nd (12th overall)
(Austria) 2002	Division I	1st (11th overall)
(Canada) 2003	Top	9th
(Germany) 2004	Division I	1st in Group A (12th overall)
(United States) 2005	Top	9th
(Slovenia) 2006	Division I	1st in Group A (11th overall)
(Sweden) 2007	Top	9th
(Germany) 2008	Division I	1st in Group A (11th overall)
(Canada) 2009	Top	9th
(France) 2010	Division I	1st in Group A (11th overall)
(United States) 2011	Top	10th
(Germany) 2012	Division I	1st in Group A (11th overall)
(Russia) 2013	Top	9th
(Sweden) 2014	Top	9th
(Canada) 2015	Top	10th
(Austria) 2016	Division I	5th in Group A (15th overall)
(Germany) 2017	Division I	2nd in Group A (12th overall)
(France) 2018	Division I	3rd in Group A (13th overall)
(Germany) 2019	Division I	1st in Group A (11th overall)
(Czech Republic) 2020	Top	9th
(Canada) 2021	Top	6th
(Canada) 2022	Top	6th
(Canada) 2023	Top	8th
(Sweden) 2024	Top	9th
(Canada) 2025	Top	9th
(United States) 2026	Top	9th
(Canada) 2027	Top	
