= Canada men's national junior ice hockey team =

Canada
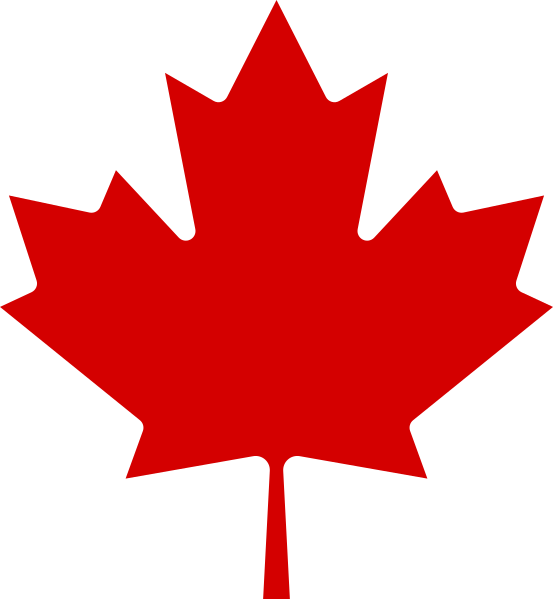
- Nickname: Team Canada (Équipe Canada)
- Association: Hockey Canada
- Head coach: Dale Hunter
- Captain: Porter Martone
- Top scorer: Connor Bedard (17)
- Most points: Connor Bedard (36)
- Team colours
- IIHF code: CAN
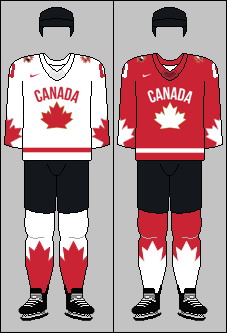

First international
- Canada 5 – 4 United States (Leningrad, Soviet Union; December 27, 1973)

Biggest win
- Canada 18 – 2 West Germany (Kitchener, Ontario, Canada; December 27, 1985); Canada 16 – 0 Latvia (Saskatoon, Saskatchewan, Canada; December 26, 2009)

Biggest defeat
- Sweden 17 – 1 Canada (Tampere, Finland; December 26, 1975)

IIHF World U20 Championship
- Appearances: 50 (first in 1977)
- Best result: (gold) Gold: 20 (1982, 1985, 1988, 1990, 1991, 1993, 1994, 1995, 1996, 1997, 2005, 2006, 2007, 2008, 2009, 2015, 2018, 2020, 2022, 2023)

International record (W–L–T)
- 246–68–22

Medal record

World Junior Championships
Gold medal – first place	1982 USA	Canada
Gold medal – first place	1985 Finland	Canada
Gold medal – first place	1988 Soviet Union	Canada
Gold medal – first place	1990 Finland	Canada
Gold medal – first place	1991 Canada	Canada
Gold medal – first place	1993 Sweden	Canada
Gold medal – first place	1994 Czech Republic	Canada
Gold medal – first place	1995 Canada	Canada
Gold medal – first place	1996 USA	Canada
Gold medal – first place	1997 Switzerland	Canada
Gold medal – first place	2005 USA	Canada
Gold medal – first place	2006 Canada	Canada
Gold medal – first place	2007 Sweden	Canada
Gold medal – first place	2008 Czech Republic	Canada
Gold medal – first place	2009 Canada	Canada
Gold medal – first place	2015 Canada	Canada
Gold medal – first place	2018 USA	Canada
Gold medal – first place	2020 Czech Republic	Canada
Gold medal – first place	2022 Canada	Canada
Gold medal – first place	2023 Canada	Canada
Silver medal – second place	1975 Canada/USA	Canada
Silver medal – second place	1976 Finland	Canada
Silver medal – second place	1977 Czechoslovakia	Canada
Silver medal – second place	1986 Canada	Canada
Silver medal – second place	1999 Canada	Canada
Silver medal – second place	2002 Czech Republic	Canada
Silver medal – second place	2003 Canada	Canada
Silver medal – second place	2004 Finland	Canada
Silver medal – second place	2010 Canada	Canada
Silver medal – second place	2011 USA	Canada
Silver medal – second place	2017 Canada	Canada
Silver medal – second place	2021 Canada	Canada
Bronze medal – third place	1974 Soviet Union	Canada
Bronze medal – third place	1978 Canada	Canada
Bronze medal – third place	1983 Soviet Union	Canada
Bronze medal – third place	2000 Sweden	Canada
Bronze medal – third place	2001 Russia	Canada
Bronze medal – third place	2012 Canada	Canada
Bronze medal – third place	2026 USA	Canada

The Canadian men's national under-20 ice hockey team is the ice hockey team representing Canada internationally in under-20 competition. Their primary participation in this age group comes at the International Ice Hockey Federation's World Junior Championship, held annually every December and January. The team also participates in various exhibition matches and occasional exhibition series, such as the 2007 Super Series against their Russian counterparts, an eight-game exhibition series commemorating the 35th anniversary of the 1972 Summit Series.

The Canadian junior team is the most successful in the world, having medalled in 36 of 50 events held since 1977, winning a record 20 gold medals. Its success can be traced back to the formation of the Program of Excellence in 1982 by the Canadian Amateur Hockey Association, which created the first true national junior team. Since that time, Canada has won 20 World Junior championships – including five in a row on two occasions, 1993–1997 and 2005–2009.

== History ==
=== Early tournaments (1974–1981) ===
The International Ice Hockey Federation (IIHF) created an invitation-only junior tournament for the top ice hockey nations in the world to be held in late December 1973 and early January 1974 in Leningrad, Soviet Union. It featured six teams: the Soviet Union, Czechoslovakia, Sweden, Finland, the United States and Canada. The Canadian Amateur Hockey Association (CAHA) hoped to send the defending Memorial Cup champion Toronto Marlboros to represent Canada, but after they declined, the Peterborough Petes, runner up to Toronto in the Ontario Hockey Association (OHA) standings, was sent. The Petes finished third, despite being the only club team in the tournament

A second tournament was held in 1975, primarily in Winnipeg, Manitoba. The CAHA sent an all-star team made up of players representing the Western Canada Hockey League WCHL as Canada's representative. The team finished in second place with a 4–1 record, their lone loss at the hands of the champion Soviet Union. As the OHA and WCHL had each sent a representative already, the Quebec Major Junior Hockey League (QMJHL) sent Canada's entry in the form of the Sherbrooke Beavers for the 1976 tournament. The team finished second despite scoring only 12 goals and giving up 27 in four games

The growing popularity of international competition begun by the 1972 Summit Series and continued with the Canada Cup led the IIHF to formalize the tournament in 1977 as the IIHF World U20 Championship (colloquially the World Junior Hockey Championship). The defending Memorial Cup champion St. Catharines Fincups of the OHA represented Canada at this first official tournament, winning the silver medal, while Dale McCourt was named the tournament's best forward. The 1978 tournament was held in Montreal. It was the first major international tournament for Wayne Gretzky, a 16-year-old phenom whom the Montreal crowd cheered wildly. Though he led the tournament in scoring with 17 points, Canada managed only a bronze medal after losing the final round-robin game to Sweden, 6–5, in which they needed only a tie for silver.

The following three years yielded poor results. The 1979 team was represented primarily by the WHL's New Westminster Bruins and finished in fifth place. The CAHA nearly chose not to send a team in 1980 due to travel costs, but donations from the three major junior leagues ensured Canada's participation. The Peterborough Petes formed the primary core of the team, supplemented by players from other OHA squads. The result, however, was another fifth-place finish. The 1981 tournament was even worse, as the Cornwall Royals, with some additions from other QMJHL teams, finished in seventh place out of eight teams.

=== Program of Excellence ===
The CAHA had long hoped to send a true national team to the tournament, but were limited by costs. To assemble such a team in 1981 would have cost four times the amount it spent to send the Cornwall Royals. The CAHA lacked the resources for such a program and preferred not to send a team at all if it couldn't send its best. However, it was in a dispute at the time with Hockey Canada and feared that if it did not send a team, the IIHF would turn to the rival governing body instead. Though the CAHA typically sent the defending Memorial Cup champion, those teams were typically weakened by the loss of graduating players and were often only a shadow of the team which won their championships. Disappointed by frequent complaints from European teams that the Canadian juniors were just "slugs" who couldn't play the game at an elite level, CAHA president Murray Costello finally set out to build a true national team program.

Known as the "Program of Excellence", Costello and the CAHA proposed a multifaceted approach that would see Canada send its top eligible juniors from across the nation. It included the creation of U-17 and U-18 programs to develop younger players and a summer training camp to evaluate potential players for the junior team. The three major-junior leagues were initially reluctant to support the proposal, as it would have required them to surrender their top players for a longer period for the tournament, as well as their younger players for regional development tournaments. The CAHA ultimately gained the support of each league, but not before having to also convince them to allow the organization to also invite eligible players from outside major junior hockey.

The team that was sent to the 1982 Tournament in Rochester, Minnesota was the first true national junior team sent. It was composed of ten players from the WHL, four from the OHL, three from the QMJHL, two playing United States college and one playing professionally in the Finnish league. The team lacked star players, but relied on a balanced offence and strong defence to post a 6–0–1 record in the round robin tournament. Canada defeated the Soviet Union 7–0 in the second-to-last game, the worst defeat the Soviets suffered in the tournament's history. The game was played at the Winnipeg Arena before a rabid crowd, which amazed the players. The Canadians entered the final game, against Czechoslovakia, guaranteed a silver medal, and needed only a tie to win gold. Played at a half-full arena in Rochester, the Czechs entered the third period leading 2–1, and would have had a larger lead if not for goaltender Mike Moffat. Two third-period goals gave Canada the lead before the Czechs tied it. They held on despite a frenzied attack in the final minutes to end with a 3–3 tie, and win Canada's first gold medal in the tournament's history.

The arena either did not have a copy of the Canadian anthem, or had technical difficulty with it, so was unable to follow the IIHF tradition of playing the winning team's anthem following the game. The players themselves chose to sing the anthem, badly off-key, an image that has since become an iconic moment in the junior program's history. The gold medal marked the first international amateur championship for Canada in 20 years, and established the value of the Program of Excellence.

=== Rivalry with the Soviet Union (1983–1991) ===
Attempting to repeat as champions in 1983, Canada endured numerous incidents with the host Soviet Union. The Soviets initially refused to grant a sufficient number of visas for the Canadian delegation; then had their clothing and equipment seized immediately by government officials when the team landed in Leningrad. It was returned three hours later, but only after the team threatened to withdraw from the tournament. Canada's first three games, all wins, were played in a small, empty arena. The fourth game was against the hosts in a larger rink at full capacity, which the team was denied the ability to practice in beforehand. The players struggled to adapt to the new playing conditions, losing 7–3, and even surrendered a goal when they mistook a whistle from somewhere in the crowd for the referees whistle and stopped playing, leaving Canada to finish the tournament with the bronze medal. The following year, the game against the Soviets ended in a 3–3 tie, but since Canada needed a win to retain a chance for gold, they were automatically placed in bronze medal contention. Canada lost to Czechoslovakia in the final game of the tournament and finished overall in fourth place.

Canada and Czechoslovakia entered their contest on the final day of the 1985 tournament in Sweden with identical 5–0–1 records. Playing for the gold medal, the game was dominated by the goaltenders: Craig Billington and Dominik Hašek. It ended in a 2–2 draw with Canada claiming gold as of a result of a better goal differential in the round-robin tournament. It was the nation's first World Championship won on European ice in 24 years. With 5–0 records, Canada and the Soviet Union again faced off for the gold medal in their match-up at the 1986 in Hamilton. The Soviets emerged 4–1 victors and won the gold, while Canada finished as silver medalists.

Believing that the Canada-Soviet match-up would again determine who won gold, the Czechoslovak hosts scheduled the two teams to be the final game of the 1987 tournament. However, the Soviet team struggled and were eliminated from contention, while Canada could win silver with a victory, or gold with a victory of 5+ goals. Norwegian referee Hans Rønning, assigned based on his neutrality despite his inexperience officiating at the international level, quickly lost control as both teams frequently attacked each other. Midway through the second period, with Canada leading 4–2, a line brawl broke out that ultimately involved nearly every player for both teams after the Soviets left their bench, closely followed by the Canadians. The melee lasted 20 minutes, ending only when the players were too exhausted to continue fighting. The brawl, which became known as the Punch-up in Piestany, resulted in the disqualification of Canada and the Soviet Union.

Players who were on the 1987 team entered the 1988 tournament in Moscow seeking redemption. They won the gold medal, finishing the tournament at 6–0–1. The 3–2 victory over the Soviet Union was the difference maker, dropping the tournament hosts to the silver medal. Canada would achieve the same feat at the 1990 and 1991 tournaments, capturing back-to-back gold medals for the first time, hinging on crucial wins over the Soviet Union. This ultimately broke the tie in points at the top of the standings each time, leaving the Soviets with silver.

=== Golden years (1993–1997) ===
From 1993 through to 1997, Canada won a record five-straight gold medals. The streak started at the 1993 World Junior Ice Hockey Championships, one of the most competitive engagements in tournament history. The host Sweden, led by Peter Forsberg, Markus Näslund, and Niklas Sundström, broke scoring records. When hosting in 1995, Canada formed a squad bolstered by the 1994–95 NHL lockout, resulting in a perfect record en route to winning gold. The streak culminated at the 1997 tournament in Switzerland.

=== Medal streak (1999–2012) ===
At the 1999 World Junior Ice Hockey Championships, Canada won silver as hosts in Winnipeg, dropping a 3–2 final in overtime to the Russian team. The tournament set records for attendance. This would also be the start of another winning display by Canada, claiming 14-straight medals from 1999–2012, including their second run of five-straight gold medals from 2005 through to 2009. At the 2009 tournament in Ottawa, where Team Canada last captured gold, Canada faced defeat against Russia in the final seconds of their semi-final before Jordan Eberle scored the equalizing goal with 5.4 seconds remaining in the game, forcing overtime. Canada would win in a shootout and go on to beat Sweden 5–1 in the final. John Tavares, the future first overall selection at the 2009 NHL entry draft, was named most valuable player of the tournament.

=== Sexual assault allegations (2022) ===
The team's players and Hockey Canada were the subject of allegations of sexual assault after the team visited London, Ontario in 2018, celebrating their gold medal at the 2018 World Championship. After an investigation by the London police, former team members Dillon Dube, Cal Foote, Alex Formenton, Carter Hart, and Michael McLeod were charged with sexual assault in late January 2024. All five were found not guilty on July 24, 2025.

== Current roster ==
Roster for the 2025 World Junior Ice Hockey Championships. (2024–25 teams listed at time of event)

Head coach: Dave Cameron

Jersey #	Position	Name	Height (ft)	Weight (lbs)	Birthdate	Hometown	2024–25 team	NHL rights
1	G	Jack Ivankovic	5'11	179	May 22, 2007	Mississauga, Ontario	Brampton Steelheads (OHL)	Nashville Predators
2	D	Andrew Gibson	6'4	206	Feb. 13, 2005	LaSalle, Ontario	Sault Ste. Marie Greyhounds (OHL)	Nashville Predators
3	D	Sam Dickinson	6'3	195	June 7, 2006	Toronto, Ontario	London Knights (OHL)	San Jose Sharks
4	D	Caden Price	6'1	180	Aug. 24, 2005	Saskatoon, Saskatchewan	Kelowna Rockets (WHL)	Seattle Kraken
5	D	Oliver Bonk	6'2	179	Jan. 9, 2005	Ottawa, Ontario	London Knights (OHL)	Philadelphia Flyers
6	D	Tanner Molendyk – A	6'0	181	Feb. 3, 2005	McBride, British Columbia	Saskatoon Blades (WHL)	Nashville Predators
7	D	Sawyer Mynio	6'1	180	Apr. 30, 2005	Kamloops, British Columbia	Seattle Thunderbirds (WHL)	Vancouver Canucks
8	D	Beau Akey	6'0	183	Feb. 11, 2005	Waterloo, Ontario	Barrie Colts (OHL)	Edmonton Oilers
9	F	Gavin McKenna	6'0	183	Dec. 20, 2007	Whitehorse, Yukon	Medicine Hat Tigers (WHL)	2026 NHL entry draft
10	F	Bradly Nadeau	5'10	161	May 5, 2005	Saint-François-de-Madawaska, New Brunswick	Chicago Wolves (AHL)	Carolina Hurricanes
11	F	Brayden Yager – C	6'0	170	Jan. 3, 2005	Saskatoon, Saskatchewan	Lethbridge Hurricanes (WHL)	Winnipeg Jets
12	F	Jett Luchanko	5'11	187	Aug. 21, 2006	London, Ontario	Guelph Storm (OHL)	Philadelphia Flyers
13	F	Luca Pinelli	5'9	169	Apr. 5, 2005	Stoney Creek, Ontario	Ottawa 67's (OHL)	Columbus Blue Jackets
14	F	Berkly Catton	5'10	170	Jan. 14, 2006	Saskatoon, Saskatchewan	Spokane Chiefs (WHL)	Seattle Kraken
16	F	Carson Rehkopf	6'1	195	Jan. 7, 2005	Vaughan, Ontario	Brampton Steelheads (OHL)	Seattle Kraken
20	F	Ethan Gauthier	5'11	186	Jan. 26, 2005	Drummondville, Quebec	Drummondville Voltigeurs (QMJHL)	Tampa Bay Lightning
21	F	Calum Ritchie – A	6'2	179	Jan. 25, 2005	Oakville, Ontario	Oshawa Generals (OHL)	Colorado Avalanche
22	F	Porter Martone	6'3	196	Oct. 26, 2006	Peterborough, Ontario	Brampton Steelheads (OHL)	Philadelphia Flyers
23	F	Tanner Howe	5'11	182	Nov. 28, 2005	Prince Albert, Saskatchewan	Calgary Hitmen (WHL)	Pittsburgh Penguins
25	D	Matthew Schaefer	6'2	188	Sept. 5, 2007	Hamilton, Ontario	Erie Otters (OHL)	New York Islanders
26	F	Cole Beaudoin	6'2	206	Apr. 24, 2006	Kanata, Ontario	Barrie Colts (OHL)	Utah Mammoth
27	F	Easton Cowan	5'11	177	May 20, 2005	Mount Brydges, Ontario	London Knights (OHL)	Toronto Maple Leafs
28	F	Mathieu Cataford	5'11	189	Mar. 1, 2005	Châteauguay, Quebec	Rimouski Océanic (QMJHL)	Vegas Golden Knights
30	G	Carter George	6'1	182	May 20, 2006	Thunder Bay, Ontario	Owen Sound Attack (OHL)	Los Angeles Kings
31	G	Carson Bjarnason	6'3	202	June 30, 2005	Carberry, Manitoba	Brandon Wheat Kings (WHL)	Philadelphia Flyers

== World Junior Championship record ==
Unofficial tournaments
Year	GP	W	L	T	GF	GA	Pts	Rank
1974	5	3	2	0	17	23	6	(bronze) Bronze
1975	5	4	1	0	27	10	8	(silver) Silver
1976	4	2	2	0	12	27	4	(silver) Silver

Official tournaments
Year	GP	W	L	T	GF	GA	Pts	Rank
1977	7	5	1	1	50	20	11	(silver) Silver
1978	6	4	2	0	36	18	8	(bronze) Bronze
1979	5	3	2	0	23	10	6	5th
1980	5	3	2	0	25	18	6	5th
1981	5	1	3	1	26	25	3	7th
1982	7	6	0	1	45	14	13	(gold) Gold
1983	7	4	2	1	39	24	9	(bronze) Bronze
1984	7	4	2	1	39	17	9	4th
1985	7	5	0	2	44	14	12	(gold) Gold
1986	7	5	2	0	54	21	10	(silver) Silver
1987	6	4	1	1	41	23	9	DSQ
1988	7	6	0	1	37	16	13	(gold) Gold
1989	7	4	2	1	31	23	9	4th
1990	7	5	1	1	36	18	11	(gold) Gold
1991	7	5	1	1	40	18	11	(gold) Gold
1992	7	2	3	2	21	30	6	6th
1993	7	6	1	0	37	17	12	(gold) Gold
1994	7	6	0	1	39	20	13	(gold) Gold
1995	7	7	0	0	49	22	14	(gold) Gold
1996	6	6	0	0	27	8	12	(gold) Gold
1997	7	5	0	2	27	13	12	(gold) Gold
1998	7	2	5+	0	13	18	4	8th
1999	7	4	2+	1	30	15	9	(silver) Silver
2000	7	4	1	2	23	14	10	(bronze) Bronze
2001	7	4	2	1	26	16	9	(bronze) Bronze
2002	7	5	2	0	40	14	10	(silver) Silver
2003	6	5	1	0	26	11	10	(silver) Silver
2004	6	5	1	0	35	9	10	(silver) Silver
2005	6	6	0	0	42	7	12	(gold) Gold
2006	6	6	0	0	25	6	12	(gold) Gold
2007	6	6*	0	0	20	7	17	(gold) Gold
2008	7	6*	1	0	23	10	17	(gold) Gold
2009	6	6*	0	0	46	12	17	(gold) Gold
2010	6	5†	1+	0	46	13	15	(silver) Silver
2011	7	5	2‡	0	39	19	16	(silver) Silver
2012	6	5	1	0	35	11	15	(bronze) Bronze
2013	6	4	2	0	27	19	12	4th
2014	7	4	3‡	0	25	20	13	4th
2015	7	7	0	0	39	9	12	(gold) Gold
2016	5	2†	3	0	18	18	5	6th
2017	7	5	2+	0	35	18	9	(silver) Silver
2018	7	6	1	0	39	11	19	(gold) Gold
2019	5	3	2+	0	24	7	10	6th
2020	7	6	1	0	32	17	18	(gold) Gold
2021	7	6	1	0	41	6	18	(silver) Silver
2022	7	7*	0	0	41	14	20	(gold) Gold
2023	7	6*	1	0	42	15	16	(gold) Gold
2024	5	3	2	0	23	10	9	5th
2025	5	2	3‡	0	13	11	7	5th
2026	7	6†	1	0	42	21	17	(bronze) Bronze

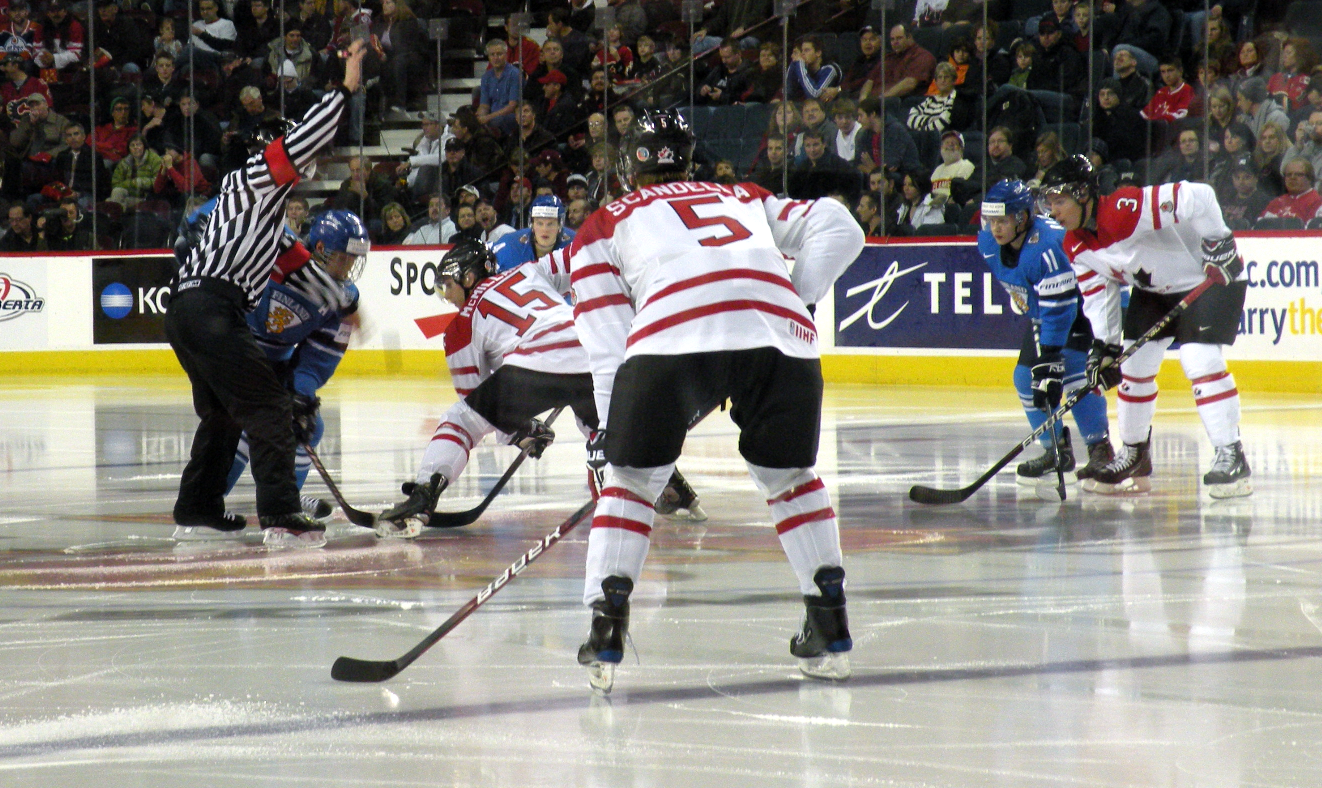
The Canadians face off against the Finnish junior team at an exhibition game in Calgary.

The 1974, 1975 and 1976 tournaments were unofficial. The 1974 team was represented by the Peterborough Petes. Canada was ejected from the tournament in 1987 for a bench clearing brawl with the Soviet Union. In 1996, a playoff was added to the tournament (prior to this, it was just a round robin tournament.) Playoff games are included in record. Since 2007, the IIHF has awarded 3 points for a win, 2 points for an overtime win and 1 point for an overtime loss.

† Includes one win in extra time (in the preliminary round)
‡ Includes one loss in extra time (in the preliminary round)
* Includes one win in extra time (in the playoff round)
+ Includes one loss in extra time (in the playoff round)

== Super Series ==
In 2007, the Canadian junior team played the Russian junior team in an eight-game Super Series commemorating the 35th anniversary of the 1972 Summit Series. For the 40th anniversary, the two teams competed in a four-game series in August 2012. The two teams split the series, which was decided on an overtime goal by Ryan Strome after Game 4.

Year	GP	W	L	T	GF	GA	Pts	Rank
2007	8	7	0	1	39	13	15	Won Series
2012	4	2	2	0	16	16	4	Won Series

== Media coverage ==
The Sports Network (TSN) produced World Junior Championship coverage annually since 1992, when Paul Graham of TSN reached a broadcast agreement with Hockey Canada vice-president Bob Nicholson. TSN initially covered only the Team Canada games, then eventually added all games in Team Canada's pool.

== Awards and honours ==
Canadian players have earned numerous honours throughout the history of the World Junior Championship.

=== Directorate Awards ===
Best Goaltender
Year	Recipient
1982	Mike Moffat
1985	Craig Billington
1988	Jimmy Waite
1990	Stéphane Fiset
1993	Manny Legace
1994	Jamie Storr
1996	José Théodore
1997	Marc Denis
1999	Roberto Luongo
2003	Marc-André Fleury
2007	Carey Price
2008	Steve Mason
2020	Joel Hofer
2021	Devon Levi

Best Forward
Year	Recipient
1977	Dale McCourt
1978	Wayne Gretzky
1986	Jim Sandlak
1991	Eric Lindros
1995	Marty Murray
1996	Jarome Iginla
2002	Michael Cammalleri
2009	John Tavares
2010	Jordan Eberle
2011	Brayden Schenn
2013	Ryan Nugent-Hopkins
2015	Max Domi
2020	Alexis Lafrenière
2022	Mason McTavish
2023	Connor Bedard

Best Defenceman
Year	Recipient
1982	Gord Kluzak
1995	Bryan McCabe
2005	Dion Phaneuf
2006	Marc Staal
2008	Drew Doughty
2010	Alex Pietrangelo
2011	Ryan Ellis
2012	Brandon Gormley
2017	Thomas Chabot

Most Valuable Player
Year	Recipient
2005	Patrice Bergeron
2007	Carey Price
2008	Steve Mason
2009	John Tavares
2010	Jordan Eberle
2011	Brayden Schenn
2017	Thomas Chabot
2020	Alexis Lafrenière
2022	Mason McTavish
2023	Connor Bedard

=== All-Star teams ===
Year	Recipients
1977	Dale McCourt (F)
1978	Wayne Gretzky (F)
1982	Mike Moffat (G), Gord Kluzak (D), Mike Moller (F)
1985	Bobby Dollas (D)
1986	Sylvain Côté (D), Shayne Corson (F)
1988	Jimmy Waite (G), Greg Hawgood (D), Theoren Fleury (F)
1990	Stéphane Fiset (G), Dave Chyzowski (F)
1991	Mike Craig (F), Eric Lindros (F)
1992	Scott Niedermayer (D)
1993	Manny Legace (G), Brent Tully (D), Paul Kariya (F)
1995	Bryan McCabe (D), Jason Allison (F), Éric Dazé (F), Marty Murray (F)
1996	José Théodore (G), Nolan Baumgartner (D), Jarome Iginla (F)
1997	Chris Phillips (D), Christian Dubé (F)
1999	Roberto Luongo (G), Brian Campbell (D), Daniel Tkaczuk (F)
2000	Mathieu Biron (D)
2001	Jason Spezza (F)
2002	Pascal Leclaire (G), Jay Bouwmeester (D), Mike Cammalleri (F)
2003	Marc-André Fleury (G), Carlo Colaiacovo (D), Scottie Upshall (F)
2004	Dion Phaneuf (D), Jeff Carter (F)
2005	Dion Phaneuf (D), Patrice Bergeron (F), Jeff Carter (F)
2006	Luc Bourdon (D), Steve Downie (F)
2007	Carey Price (G), Kris Letang (D), Jonathan Toews (F)
2008	Steve Mason (G), Drew Doughty (D)
2009	P. K. Subban (D), Cody Hodgson (F), John Tavares (F)
2010	Alex Pietrangelo (D), Jordan Eberle (F)
2011	Ryan Ellis (D), Ryan Johansen (F), Brayden Schenn (F)
2012	Brandon Gormley (D)
2013	Ryan Nugent-Hopkins (F)
2014	Anthony Mantha (F)
2015	Josh Morrissey (D), Connor McDavid (F), Sam Reinhart (F), Max Domi (F)
2017	Thomas Chabot (D)
2018	Cale Makar (D)
2020	Joel Hofer (G), Barrett Hayton (F), Alexis Lafrenière (F)
2021	Devon Levi (G), Bowen Byram (D), Dylan Cozens (F)
2022	Olen Zellweger (D), Mason McTavish (F)
2023	Connor Bedard (F)

== See also ==
- Canada men's national ice hockey team
