= Yugoslavia men's national junior ice hockey team =

Yugoslavia
- Most points: Dejan Bugarsk (40)
- IIHF code: YUG

First international
- Switzerland 7 - 3 Yugoslavia (Strasbourg, France; March 23, 1981)

Biggest win
- Yugoslavia 33 - 1 Greece (Belgrade, Yugoslavia; December 27, 1990)

Biggest defeat
- Switzerland 13 - 1 Yugoslavia (Chamonix, France; March 19, 1989)

IIHF World U20 Championship
- Appearances: 8 (first in 1981)
- Best result: 5th in Pool B: (1989)

International record (W–L–T)
- 19-21-5

The Yugoslavia men's national under 20 ice hockey team was the national under-20 ice hockey team in the Socialist Federal Republic of Yugoslavia. The team represented Yugoslavia at the International Ice Hockey Federation's IIHF World U20 Championship.
