= Switzerland men's national junior ice hockey team =

Switzerland
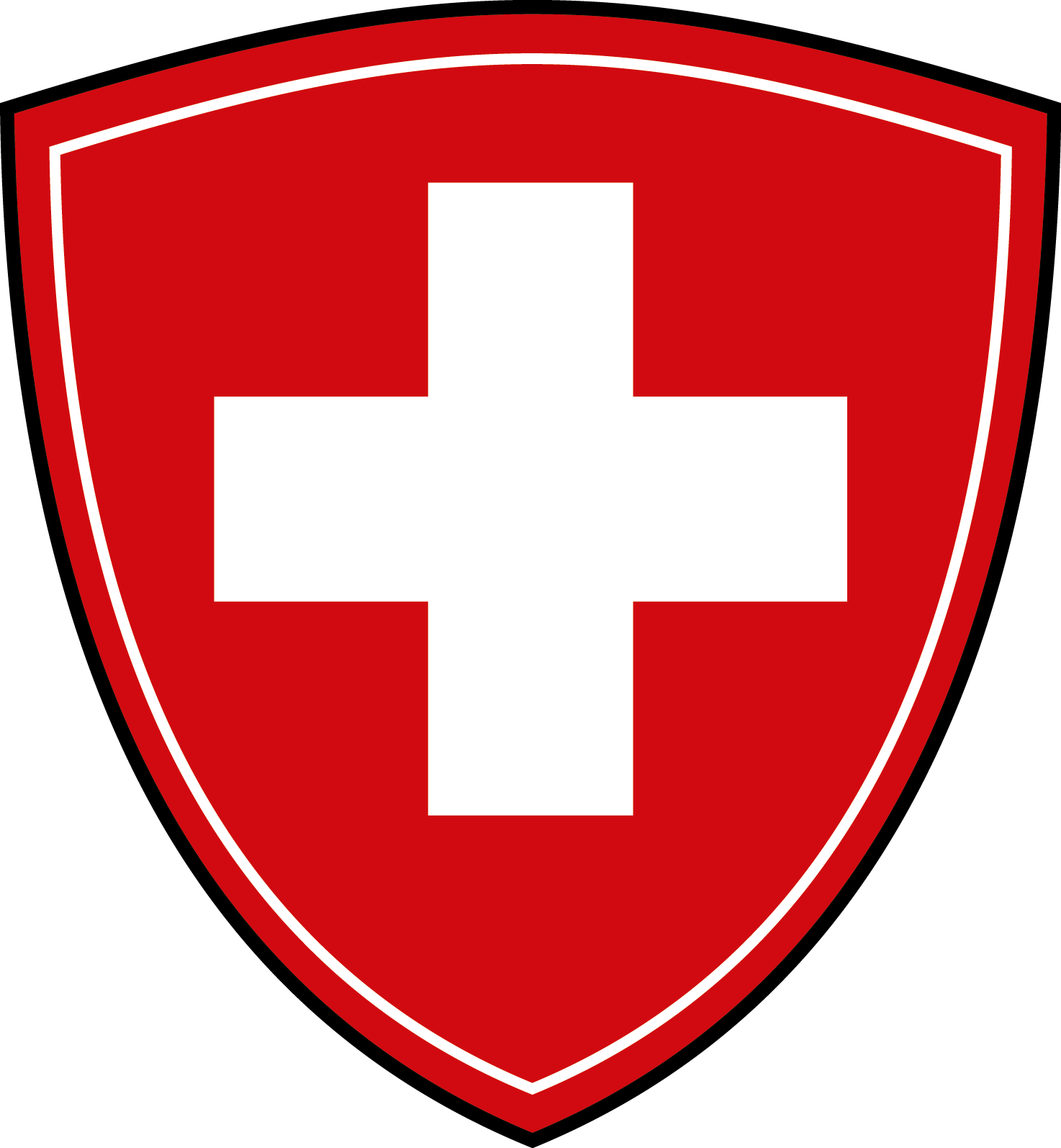
- Association: Swiss Ice Hockey Federation
- General manager: Raeto Raffainer
- Head coach: (Switzerland) Marco Bayer
- Assistants: (Switzerland) Corsin Camichel (Sweden) Tommy Albelin
- Captain: vacant
- Most points: Peter Jaks (27)
- Team colors
- IIHF code: SUI
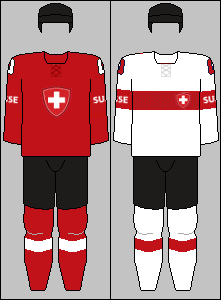

First international
- Soviet Union 18 – 1 Switzerland (Cornwall, Ontario, Canada; 22 December 1977)

Biggest win
- Switzerland 20 – 7 Austria (Sapporo, Japan; 24 March 1985)

Biggest defeat
- Finland 19 – 1 Switzerland (Helsinki, Finland; 27 December 1979)

IIHF World Junior Championship
- Appearances: 49 (first in 1978)
- Best result: (bronze) (1998)

International record (W–L–T)
- 119-168-12

Medal record

IIHF World Junior Championship
Bronze medal – third place	1998 Finland	Switzerland

The Switzerland men's national under 20 ice hockey team is the national under-20 ice hockey team of Switzerland. The team is controlled by the Swiss Ice Hockey Federation, a member of the International Ice Hockey Federation.

== History ==
Switzerland played its first game in 1977 against the Soviet Union during the 1978 IIHF World U20 Championship. Switzerland lost the game 1–18 and finished last in the tournament and were relegated to the Pool B tournament for the following year. After winning the 1979 Pool B tournament of the 1979 IIHF World U20 Championship they were promoted back to the top Pool A championship. During the 1980 IIHF World U20 Championship Switzerland suffered their worst defeat in international participation after being beaten by Finland 1–19. Switzerland went on to finish last in the tournament and were relegated back to Pool B for the following year. Switzerland continued to move between the top division and the Pool B tournament. During the Pool B tournament of the 1985 IIHF World U20 Championship Switzerland achieved their largest win in international participation when they defeated Austria 20–7. In 1998 Switzerland won their first medal at the World U20 Championships after finishing in third at the 1998 IIHF World U20 Championship by defeating the Czech Republic in the bronze medal game. In 2008 Switzerland finished ninth and were relegated to Division I for the following year. This was the first time in a lower division since competing in the 1995 Pool B tournament. They returned to the top division for 2010 after winning their 2009 Division I Group A tournament. At the 2012 IIHF World U20 Championship being held in Alberta, Canada, Switzerland finished in eight place.

Peter Jaks currently holds the team record for most points with 19.

== International competitions ==
=== IIHF WJ U20 Hockey Championships ===
- 1978 World Junior Championships – 8th
- 1979 World Junior Championships – 1st in Pool B (9th overall)
- 1980 World Junior Championships – 8th
- 1981 World Junior Championships – 1st in Pool B (9th overall)
- 1982 World Junior Championships – 8th
- 1983 World Junior Championships – 1st in Pool B (9th overall)
- 1984 World Junior Championships – 8th
- 1985 World Junior Championships – 1st in Pool B (9th overall)
- 1986 World Junior Championships – 7th
- 1987 World Junior Championships – 6th
- 1988 World Junior Championships – 3rd in Pool B (11th overall)
- 1989 World Junior Championships – 2nd in Pool B (10th overall)
- 1990 World Junior Championships – 1st in Pool B (9th overall)
- 1991 World Junior Championships – 7th
- 1992 World Junior Championships – 8th
- 1993 World Junior Championships – 1st in Pool B (9th overall)
- 1994 World Junior Championships – 8th
- 1995 World Junior Championships – 1st in Pool B (9th overall)
- 1996 World Junior Championships – 9th
- 1997 World Junior Championships – 7th
- 1998 World Junior Championships – 3rd
- 1999 World Junior Championships – 9th
- 2000 World Junior Championships – 6th
- 2001 World Junior Championships – 6th
- 2002 World Junior Championships – 4th
- 2003 World Junior Championships – 7th
- 2004 World Junior Championships – 8th
- 2005 World Junior Championships – 8th
- 2006 World Junior Championships – 7th
- 2007 World Junior Championships – 7th
- 2008 World Junior Championships – 9th
- 2009 World Junior Championships – 1st in Division I Group A (11th overall)
- 2010 World Junior Championships – 4th
- 2011 World Junior Championships – 5th
- 2012 World Junior Championships – 8th
- 2013 World Junior Championships – 6th
- 2014 World Junior Championships – 7th
- 2015 World Junior Championships – 9th
- 2016 World Junior Championships – 9th
- 2017 World Junior Championships – 7th
- 2018 World Junior Championships – 8th
- 2019 World Junior Championships – 4th
- 2020 World Junior Championships – 5th
- 2021 World Junior Championships – 9th
- 2022 World Junior Championships – 8th
- 2023 World Junior Championships – 7th
- 2024 World Junior Championships – 7th
- 2025 World Junior Championships – 8th
- 2026 World Junior Championships – 6th

== See also ==
- Switzerland men's national ice hockey team
- Switzerland women's national ice hockey team
- Switzerland women's national under-18 ice hockey team
