= Lars Eriksson (ice hockey) =

Swedish ice hockey player

- Born: April 16, 1961 (age 63); Sweden
- Height: 5 ft 11 in (180 cm)
- Weight: 183 lb (83 kg; 13 st 1 lb)
- Position: Goaltender
- Caught: -
- SEL team: Brynäs IF
- NHL draft: 32nd overall, 1981; Montreal Canadiens
- Playing career: 1980–1993

Medal record

Representing Sweden

Ice hockey

World Junior Championships
Gold medal – first place	1981 West Germany	

Lars Eriksson (born April 16, 1961), is a retired ice hockey goaltender who spent 14 seasons with Brynäs IF. Eriksson won a WJC gold medal in 1981.
