= Darius Kasparaitis =

Lithuanian ice hockey player (born 1972)

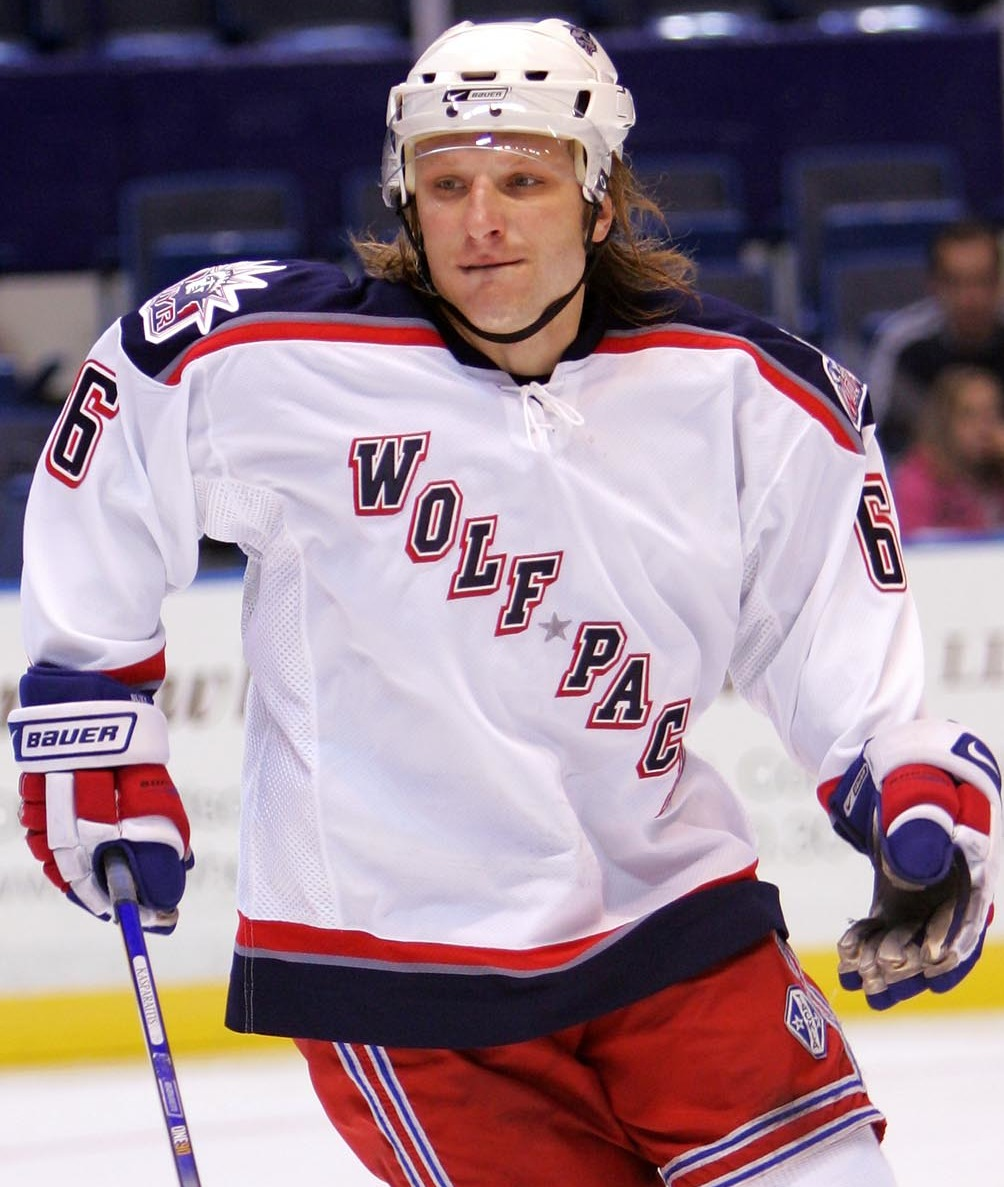
- Kasparaitis with the Hartford Wolf Pack in 2006
- Born: October 16, 1972 (age 54) Elektrėnai, Lithuanian SSR, Soviet Union
- Height: 5 ft 11 in (180 cm)
- Weight: 215 lb (98 kg; 15 st 5 lb)
- Position: Defence
- Shot: Left
- Played for: Dynamo Moscow; New York Islanders; Pittsburgh Penguins; Colorado Avalanche; New York Rangers; Ak Bars Kazan; SKA Saint Petersburg; Hockey Punks Vilnius
- National team: Soviet Union, Unified Team, Russia and Lithuania
- NHL draft: 5th overall, 1992; New York Islanders
- Playing career: 1988–2009; 2013–2018

Darius Kasparaitis (born October 16, 1972) is a Lithuanian-American former professional ice hockey player. He played as a defenceman in the National Hockey League (NHL) for the New York Islanders, Pittsburgh Penguins, Colorado Avalanche, and New York Rangers. He is a four-time Olympian and three-time medalist, winning one gold medal, one silver medal, and one bronze medal. He received the title of Honoured Master of Sports of the USSR in 1992 and was inducted into the Russian and Soviet Hockey Hall of Fame in 2016. His 28 career Winter Olympic games is a record among Russian national team players.

== Playing career ==
Kasparaitis left Lithuanian SSR for Russian SFSR at age 14 after training with Aleksey Nikiforov to play ice hockey at a higher level. Kasparaitis played his first game for Dynamo Moscow, one of the premier teams in the Soviet Union, at the age of 16 during the 1988–89 season, and won the Soviet League championship with them in 1992. He was drafted by the New York Islanders with the fifth overall pick in the first round of the 1992 NHL entry draft. Kasparaitis played for the New York Islanders, Pittsburgh Penguins, Colorado Avalanche, and New York Rangers.

Kasparaitis was known for his aggressive physical playing style and led his teams in hits several times, including his rookie season, in 1992–93 NHL season with the New York Islanders. On November 17, 1996, Kasparaitis was traded to the Pittsburgh Penguins. While playing for the Pittsburgh Penguins in 1998 Kasparaitis made a hard hit on Eric Lindros that knocked Lindros out of action for 18 games. On March 19, 2002, he was traded to the Colorado Avalanche at the trade deadline, where he spent the remainder of the 2001–02 NHL season. Kasparaitis eventually wound up with the New York Rangers when he was signed on July 2, 2002. During the 2005–06 season, he served as an alternate captain of the Rangers, along with Jaromír Jágr and Steve Rucchin, as the Rangers had no captain.

Because the Lithuanian national ice hockey team was relatively weak and had not ever played in major competitions, Kasparaitis chose to represent Russia in official events. In December 2005, Kasparaitis was chosen to represent Russia in the 2006 Winter Olympics. At the start of the 2006–07 season, Kasparaitis was replaced as an alternate captain with the Rangers by newly acquired Brendan Shanahan. He was waived by the New York Rangers on January 24, 2007 and subsequently demoted to the Rangers' affiliate in Hartford.

Kasparaitis was once again waived by the Rangers prior to the 2007–08 season. On November 3, 2007, the Rangers announced that Kasparaitis had been loaned to SKA St. Petersburg of the then-Russian Superleague (RSL), now the KHL. The deal was made possible due to a lack of a transfer agreement between Russia and North America at the time. However, the Rangers retained his NHL rights.

Kasparaitis left an enduring impression with Ranger fans with the team salute that he created. After every Rangers home win, Kasparaitis would direct the players to center ice and have the whole team follow in saluting the fans by raising their sticks in the air before departing the ice. The tradition is still carried on by the Rangers for every home win. He continued to play for SKA Saint Petersburg in the 2008–09 season. In 26 games, he contributed a single assist.

In the 2009–10 season, he did not play due to an injury and eventually announced his retirement at the conclusion of the season. Since his retirement he has attempted to become eligible to represent Lithuania internationally, which he finally did in 2018, playing for the team in the World Ice Hockey Championships Division 1B.

== International play ==
Kasparaitis first had international experience at the 1990 European Junior Championships. He contributed to the gold medal-winning team by recordings six points (including one goal). The following year, he competed in the 1991 World Junior Championships. He recorded seven points (including one goal) as the Soviet junior team won the gold medal. In August 1991, he joined the Soviet Union senior team and played in two exhibition games against Sweden.

Kasparaitis won a gold medal at the 1992 Winter Olympics as a member of the United Team, and after the Olympics, he played for the Russian national team. He made his first appearance for Russia on 12 April 1992 in a friendly match against Sweden. In the same year, Kasparaitis participated in the 1992 World Championships and the Russian national team finished in fifth place. In 1996, he competed in two international competitions, the 1996 World Championships and the 1996 World Cup of Hockey, finishing fourth in both. In 1998, he participated in the 1998 Winter Olympics, where he reached the final and won a silver medal.

Four years later, Kasparaitis played in his third Olympics at the 2002 Winter Olympics. He scored a goal in the bronze medal match against Belarus to help Russia win the bronze medal. Two years later, he competed in the 2004 World Cup of Hockey and recorded two assists in eight games. In 2006, he competed in his last Olympics, the 2006 Winter Olympics, and had two assists in eight games, while the Russian team finished in fourth place.

In 2018, Kasparaitis played for Lithuania national team in the 2018 IIHF World Championship Division I.

== Playing style ==
"I don't worry whether someone hates me if they are from Pittsburgh. I want people to like me on Long Island. If I'm traded to Pittsburgh, I want them to like me there. It's business."

— Kasparaitis on May 13, 1993 prior to game 7 against the Pittsburgh Penguins in the second round of the Stanley Cup playoffs.

Kasparaitis played the game in the mold of a hard-hitting stay-at-home defenceman, a playing style which in Kasparaitis's case also included a substantial amount of agitation. In his rookie season in the NHL in 1992–93, he had already earned a reputation as a pesky player; one hockey pundit at the time wrote that he "shows an unusual lack of respect and deference for established NHL stars." One such star was Pittsburgh Penguins captain Mario Lemieux; in Game 6 of the Patrick Division finals during the 1993 Stanley Cup playoffs, Kasparaitis was "in Lemieux's face" for much of the game, at one point giving him a glove to the face and eventually earning a 2-minute elbowing penalty.

During the 1997–98 season, while a member of the Pittsburgh Penguins, Kasparaitis decked Philadelphia Flyers captain Eric Lindros along the boards with a hard and straight hit to the chest, a hit which left Lindros with a concussion and held him out of the game for over a month. The two players later became teammates and friends when Kasparaitis signed with the New York Rangers for the 2002–03 season, with Lindros himself helping to pitch the Rangers as the right destination for Kasparaitis by calling him at midnight on July 1, 2002.

"It's the other teams that get upset. The other teams may say they don't respect me, but I'm not a dirty player; I just play hard. I hit people without telling them I'm going to hit them, and I don't think they like that."

— Kasparaitis on his on-ice role in March 2006.

During the 2005–06 NHL season, while playing for the New York Rangers, Kasparaitis had run-ins with New Jersey Devils right winger Grant Marshall, with Kasparaitis delivering a shoulder to the head of Marshall which concussed the New Jersey winger on January 22, and Marshall retaliating on March 4 by sucker-punching Kasparaitis in the head. Marshall stated he had "zero respect" for Kasparaitis. Kasparaitis on the other hand said he was in complete control of his emotions, and that he would not allow his game to become a distraction to his own team.

== Post-retirement ==
On June 19, 2010, Kasparaitis signed as the assistant coach for SKA Saint Petersburg of the Kontinental Hockey League (KHL). The contract expired on December 22, 2010.

In early 2015, Kasparaitis co-founded the Verzasca Group, a Florida-based real estate development company, of which he holds the title as president. The company is named after the Verzasca river in Switzerland, because of the "transparency that the firm strives to bring to both its investors and its development partners." Later in the year, the company had gained approval on two residential projects in the Miami area.

== Personal life ==
Kasparaitis holds dual Lithuanian and United States citizenship. He is the father of six children. He has a daughter by his first wife, and he also has twin daughters and three sons by his third wife. In January 2026, Kasparaitis remarried for the fourth time.

== Career statistics ==
=== Regular season and playoffs ===
			Regular season					Playoffs
Season	Team	League	GP	G	A	Pts	PIM	GP	G	A	Pts	PIM
1988–89	Dynamo Moscow	USSR	3	0	0	0	0	—	—	—	—	—
1989–90	Dynamo Moscow	USSR	1	0	0	0	0	—	—	—	—	—
1990–91	Dynamo Moscow	USSR	17	0	1	1	10	—	—	—	—	—
1990–91	Dynamo–2 Moscow	USSR-3	16	3	7	10	6	—	—	—	—	—
1991–92	Dynamo Moscow	CIS	24	1	7	8	8	7	1	3	4	6
1991–92	Dynamo–2 Moscow	CIS-3	8	2	1	3	8	—	—	—	—	—
1992–93	Dynamo Moscow	IHL	7	1	3	4	8	—	—	—	—	—
1992–93	New York Islanders	NHL	79	4	17	21	166	18	0	5	5	31
1993–94	New York Islanders	NHL	76	1	10	11	142	4	0	0	0	8
1994–95	New York Islanders	NHL	13	0	1	1	22	—	—	—	—	—
1995–96	New York Islanders	NHL	46	1	7	8	93	—	—	—	—	—
1996–97	New York Islanders	NHL	18	0	5	5	16	—	—	—	—	—
1996–97	Pittsburgh Penguins	NHL	57	2	16	18	84	5	0	0	0	6
1997–98	Pittsburgh Penguins	NHL	81	4	8	12	127	5	0	0	0	8
1998–99	Pittsburgh Penguins	NHL	48	1	4	5	70	—	—	—	—	—
1999–00	Pittsburgh Penguins	NHL	73	3	12	15	146	11	1	1	2	10
2000–01	Pittsburgh Penguins	NHL	77	3	16	19	111	17	1	1	2	26
2001–02	Pittsburgh Penguins	NHL	69	2	12	14	123	—	—	—	—	—
2001–02	Colorado Avalanche	NHL	11	0	0	0	19	21	0	3	3	18
2002–03	New York Rangers	NHL	80	3	11	14	85	—	—	—	—	—
2003–04	New York Rangers	NHL	44	1	9	10	48	—	—	—	—	—
2004–05	Ak Bars Kazan	RSL	28	1	3	4	118	3	0	0	0	6
2005–06	New York Rangers	NHL	67	0	6	6	97	2	0	0	0	0
2006–07	New York Rangers	NHL	24	2	2	4	30	—	—	—	—	—
2006–07	Hartford Wolf Pack	AHL	12	0	3	3	8	—	—	—	—	—
2007–08	Hartford Wolf Pack	AHL	4	1	0	1	4	—	—	—	—	—
2007–08	SKA Saint Petersburg	RSL	33	1	4	5	83	8	0	2	2	49
2008–09	SKA Saint Petersburg	KHL	26	0	1	1	34	—	—	—	—	—
2013–14	Hockey Punks Vilnius	LTU	1	1	0	1	12	—	—	—	—	—
2014–15	Hockey Punks Vilnius	LTU	1	1	2	3	0	—	—	—	—	—
2015–16	Hockey Punks Vilnius	LTU	3	2	9	11	0	—	—	—	—	—
2016–17	Hockey Punks Vilnius	LTU	2	2	5	7	0	—	—	—	—	—
2017–18	Energija Elektrėnai	LTU	1	0	1	1	2	—	—	—	—	—
RSL/KHL totals			146	5	22	27	267	11	0	2	2	55
NHL totals			863	27	136	163	1379	83	2	10	12	107

=== International ===
Medal record

Men's ice hockey

Representing Unified Team

Winter Olympics
Gold medal – first place	1992 Albertville	

Representing Russia

Winter Olympics
Silver medal – second place	1998 Nagano	
Bronze medal – third place	2002 Salt Lake City	

Representing Lithuania

World Championship Division I
Gold medal – first place	2018 Lithuania	

Representing CIS

World Junior Championships
Gold medal – first place	1992 Germany	

Representing Soviet Union

World Junior Championships
Silver medal – second place	1991 Canada	

European Junior Championships
Silver medal – second place	1990 Sweden	

Year	Team	Event	GP	G	A	Pts	PIM
1990	Soviet Union	EJC	6	1	6	7	12
1991	Soviet Union	WJC	6	1	3	4	16
1992	CIS	WJC	7	1	5	6	4
1992	Unified Team	OLY	8	0	2	2	2
1992	Russia	WC	6	2	1	3	4
1996	Russia	WC	8	0	2	2	2
1996	Russia	WCH	5	0	2	2	14
1998	Russia	OLY	6	0	2	2	6
2002	Russia	OLY	6	1	0	1	4
2004	Russia	WCH	4	0	1	1	8
2006	Russia	OLY	8	0	2	2	8
2018	Lithuania	WC D1B	5	0	2	2	2
Junior totals			19	3	14	17	36
Senior totals			51	3	12	15	50

== Awards and honors ==
- 1990: European Junior Championship All-Star Team
- 1992: World Junior Championships Best Defenceman
- 1992: Honoured Master of Sports of the USSR (renamed Honoured Master of Sports of Russia in 1993)
- 2016: Russian Hockey Hall of Fame

Awards and achievements
Preceded by Scott Lachance	New York Islanders first-round draft pick 1992	Succeeded by Todd Bertuzzi
