= Sergei Krivokrasov =

Russian ice hockey player (born 1974)

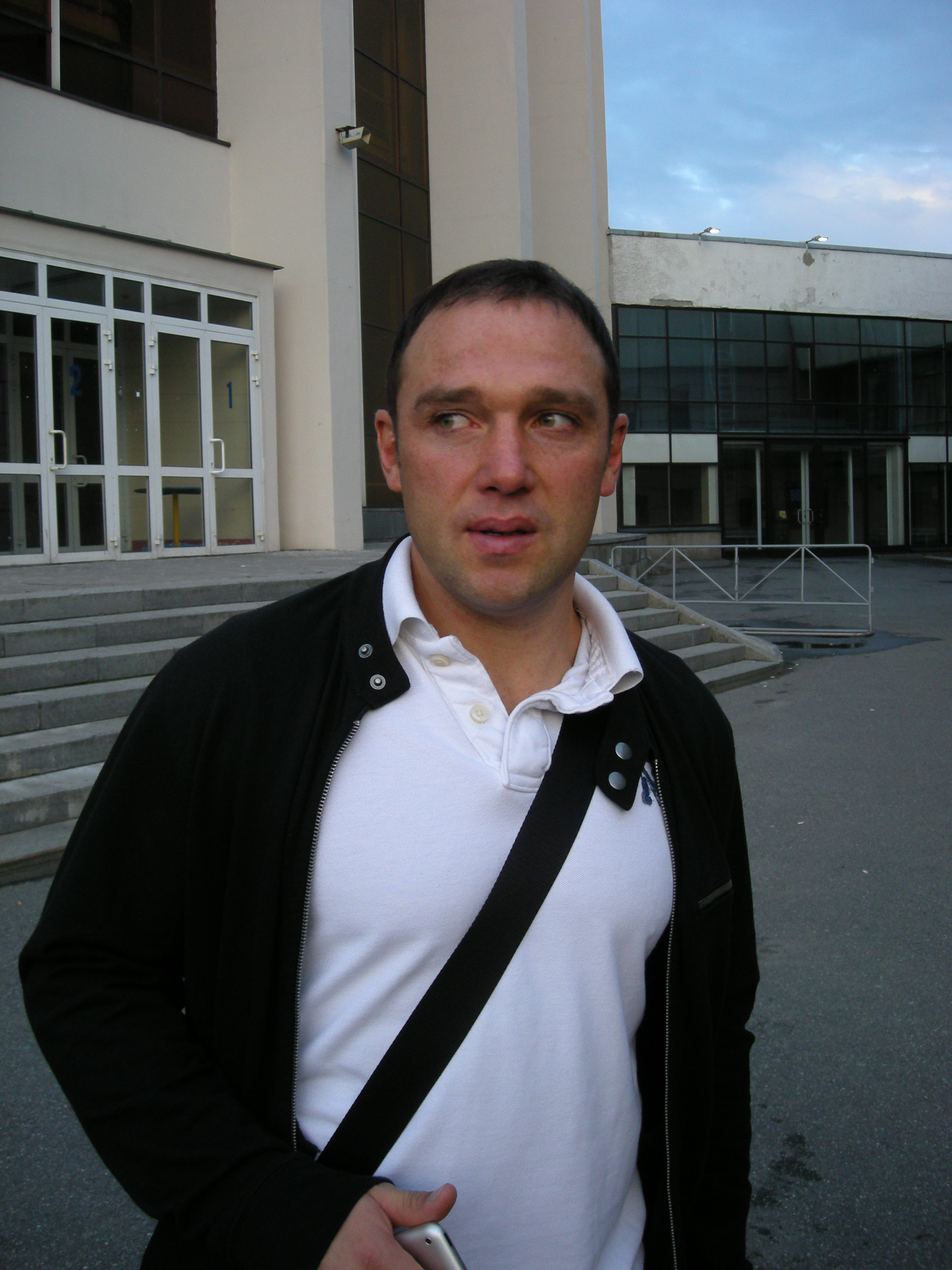
- Born: 15 April 1974 (age 52) Angarsk, Soviet Union
- Height: 5 ft 10 in (178 cm)
- Weight: 183 lb (83 kg; 13 st 1 lb)
- Position: Right wing
- Shot: Left
- Played for: CSKA Moscow; Chicago Blackhawks; Nashville Predators; Calgary Flames; Mighty Ducks of Anaheim; Minnesota Wild; Amur Khabarovsk; Avangard Omsk; Severstal Cherepovets; Dynamo Moscow; Metallurg Novokuznetsk
- National team: Russia
- NHL draft: 12th overall, 1992; Chicago Blackhawks
- Playing career: 1990–2008

Olympic medal record

Representing Russia

Men's ice hockey
Silver medal – second place	1998 Nagano	Team

Sergei Vladimirovich Krivokrasov (Russian: Серге́й Владимирович Кривокрасов, born 15 April 1974) is a Russian former professional ice hockey forward who played in the National Hockey League for ten seasons between 1992 and 2002. He represented the Nashville Predators in the 1999 NHL All-Star Game.

== Playing career ==
Krivokrasov came up through the ranks of the famed CSKA Moscow club in Russia, breaking into the full squad at age 17 in 1991–92 and scoring 10 goals. He was also one of the top players on the Russian squad which won the 1992 World Junior Championships. Impressed with his grit and goalscoring ability, the Chicago Blackhawks selected him in the first round, 12th overall, in the 1992 NHL entry draft.

Krivokrasov quickly signed with Chicago and was assigned to the Indianapolis Ice, the team's IHL affiliate for the 1992–93 season, where he impressed with 36 goals and 69 points as a rookie, and earned a four-game callup to Chicago. He remained in Indianapolis in 1993–94, and although his production dropped at that level he appeared in another 9 games for Chicago, scoring his first NHL goal.

During the 1994–95 NHL lockout Krivokrasov was again in Indianapolis, but he was quickly promoted to Chicago at the conclusion of the lockout in January, and played regularly for Chicago for the rest of the campaign. His rookie season was an excellent one, as he posted 12 goals and 7 assists for 19 points in 41 games. His 12 goals placed him 6th on the Hawks and 8th amongst all NHL rookies.

However, after the success of his rookie year, the rest of Krivokrasov's stay in Chicago would be unsettled. He was briefly reassigned to Indianapolis in the midst of a disappointing sophomore campaign that saw him score only 6 goals in 46 games. He did, however, score the biggest goal of his NHL career, an overtime winner against the Colorado Avalanche in Game 4 of their second round playoff series. In 1996-97, he set career highs with 13 goals and 24 points, but his offensive production was still below what was expected given his promising start. After scoring only 10 goals in 1997–98, he was dealt to the expansion Nashville Predators in the summer of 1998.

On a first-year expansion team in Nashville, Krivokrasov was given more responsibility than he'd received in Chicago, and responded with the finest season of his career. He nearly doubled his career high with 25 goals to lead the Predators, finished 3rd on the club with 48 points, and was selected to be the franchise's representative at the 1999 NHL All-Star Game. His season was topped by the opportunity to represent Russia at the 1998 Winter Olympics, where he helped his country to a silver medal.

Unfortunately, his success in Nashville would be short-lived. In 1999–2000, the inconsistency he showed in Chicago returned and he was replaced on the team's top line by Patric Kjellberg. Krivokrasov is credited with scoring the first NHL goal of the 21st century, in a 3-2 win against the San Jose Sharks on January 1, 2000. With just 9 goals and 26 points through 63 games, he was dealt at the NHL trade deadline to the Calgary Flames for Cale Hulse and a 3rd round draft pick. In Calgary, he responded well with 1 goal and 10 assists in 12 games to finish the year with 10 goals and 27 assists (a career high) for 37 points. However, Calgary decided to expose him in the 2000 NHL Expansion Draft where he was claimed by the Minnesota Wild.

Minnesota hoped that Krivokrasov could duplicate his performance two seasons prior for the first-year Predators, but he never settled into the defense-first system of head coach Jacques Lemaire. He finished the 2000–01 season with totals of just 7 goals and 22 points in 54 games, his lowest totals since 1996. 9 games into the 2001–02 campaign, he was dealt to the Mighty Ducks of Anaheim for a 7th round draft pick. In Anaheim, he fared no better, scoring just 1 goal in 17 games before being assigned to the minors for the first time in six years.

With his NHL career at a standstill, Krivokrasov returned to Russia for the 2002-03 season, signing for Amur Khabarovsk. He would have a fine season, finishing with 16 goals and 18 assists in 51 games. Towards the end of the 2003-04 season, he was moved to Avangard Omsk, one of the top teams in the Russian Hockey League, where he helped the team to the 2004 championship. This was not without controversy, however, as he was a central player in the Krivokrasov stick incident in the semifinals, after exchanging an illegal stick during a delay prior to measurement.

Krivokrasov's final few seasons in the Russian league would be nomadic as he appeared for 5 clubs between 2004 and 2008 (including Severstal Cherepovets, Dynamo Moscow and Metallurg Novokuznetsk), most notably a return to his first club CSKA Moscow in 2005–06. After two seasons with Metallurg Novokuznetsk, he retired in 2008. He now lives in Denver, CO.

Krivokrasov finished his career with totals of 86 goals and 109 assists for 195 points in 450 NHL games. In the various incarnations of the top Russian division, he added an additional 93 goals and 82 assists for 175 points in 375 games.

== Controversies ==
=== Legal issues ===
In 1992 Krivokrasov was accused of beating a pregnant woman after she requested money for an abortion. In 2002 Krivokrasov was accused of assaulting his wife; ripping her hair out and shoving her down steps. In 2023 Kriovokrasov and his brother were accused of raping a woman stemming from an incident in 2000.

=== 2004 stick incident ===
This scandal occurred during 3rd game of 2003–04 Russian Hockey Super League playoff semifinals between Avangard Omsk and HC Lada Togliatti. At 3:05 left in the third period, Lada Head coach, Petr Vorobiev, asked for Krivokrasov's stick measurement. The referee for the game, Sergei Gusev, accepted the request, however delayed the procedure by several minutes. Stick was measured and proved legal, so Lada was given a minor penalty for delaying the game.

However, it was witnessed by several Lada staff members, that Krivokrasov had changed his stick during the delay—and reported immediately to game officials. This appeal was denied, so Vorobiev ordered his team to leave the ice as a protest. After the short consultation with game inspector, referee finally called minor and misconduct penalties against Krivokrasov, but Lada refused to return, since their minor penalty for delaying the game stayed intact. 1:0 victory (the score before the incident) was awarded then to Avangard.

Several days later, game officials for this game were suspended until the end of the season for "critical mistakes in measurement procedures". Lada was fined, and Petr Vorobiev served a 5-game suspension for League regulations violation.

== Career statistics ==
=== Regular season and playoffs ===
			Regular season					Playoffs
Season	Team	League	GP	G	A	Pts	PIM	GP	G	A	Pts	PIM
1990–91	CSKA Moscow	USSR	41	4	0	4	8	—	—	—	—	—
1991–92	CSKA Moscow	CIS	36	10	8	18	10	6	0	0	0	25
1991–92	CSKA–2 Moscow	CIS.3	3	0	3	3	20	—	—	—	—	—
1992–93	Chicago Blackhawks	NHL	4	0	0	0	0	—	—	—	—	—
1992–93	Indianapolis Ice	IHL	78	36	33	69	157	5	3	1	4	2
1993–94	Chicago Blackhawks	NHL	9	1	0	1	4	—	—	—	—	—
1993–94	Indianapolis Ice	IHL	53	19	26	45	145	—	—	—	—	—
1994–95	Indianapolis Ice	IHL	29	12	15	27	41	—	—	—	—	—
1994–95	Chicago Blackhawks	NHL	41	12	7	19	33	10	0	0	0	8
1995–96	Indianapolis Ice	IHL	9	4	5	9	28	—	—	—	—	—
1995–96	Chicago Blackhawks	NHL	46	6	10	16	32	5	1	0	1	2
1996–97	Chicago Blackhawks	NHL	67	13	11	24	42	6	1	0	1	4
1997–98	Chicago Blackhawks	NHL	58	10	13	23	33	—	—	—	—	—
1998–99	Nashville Predators	NHL	70	25	23	48	42	—	—	—	—	—
1999–2000	Nashville Predators	NHL	63	9	17	26	40	—	—	—	—	—
1999–2000	Calgary Flames	NHL	12	1	10	11	4	—	—	—	—	—
2000–01	Minnesota Wild	NHL	54	7	15	22	20	—	—	—	—	—
2001–02	Minnesota Wild	NHL	9	1	1	2	17	—	—	—	—	—
2001–02	Mighty Ducks of Anaheim	NHL	17	1	2	3	19	—	—	—	—	—
2001–02	Cincinnati Mighty Ducks	AHL	15	3	5	8	27	1	0	0	0	2
2002–03	Amur Khabarovsk	RSL	51	16	18	34	87	—	—	—	—	—
2003–04	Amur Khabarovsk	RSL	39	14	14	28	161	—	—	—	—	—
2003–04	Avangard Omsk	RSL	12	1	3	4	12	11	3	0	3	36
2004–05	Avangard Omsk	RSL	17	3	4	7	32	—	—	—	—	—
2004–05	Severstal Cherepovets	RSL	26	7	10	17	42	—	—	—	—	—
2005–06	CSKA Moscow	RSL	50	15	5	20	102	7	1	1	2	18
2006–07	Dynamo Moscow	RSL	18	2	2	4	28	—	—	—	—	—
2006–07	Metallurg Novokuznetsk	RSL	22	7	5	12	28	1	0	0	0	0
2007–08	Metallurg Novokuznetsk	RSL	57	14	14	28	103	—	—	—	—	—
NHL totals			450	86	109	195	288	21	2	0	2	14
IHL totals			169	71	79	150	371	5	3	1	4	2
RSL totals			292	79	74	153	595	19	4	1	5	54

=== International ===
Year	Team	Event	Place	GP	G	A	Pts	PIM
1991	Soviet Union	EJC	2nd place, silver medalist(s)	6	4	2	6	29
1992	CIS	WJC	1st place, gold medalist(s)	7	3	3	6	22
1998	Russia	OG	2nd place, silver medalist(s)	6	0	0	0	4

Preceded by Dean McAmmond	Chicago Blackhawks first-round draft pick 1992	Succeeded by Eric Lecompte
