= Gena Lee Nolin =

American actress (born 1971)

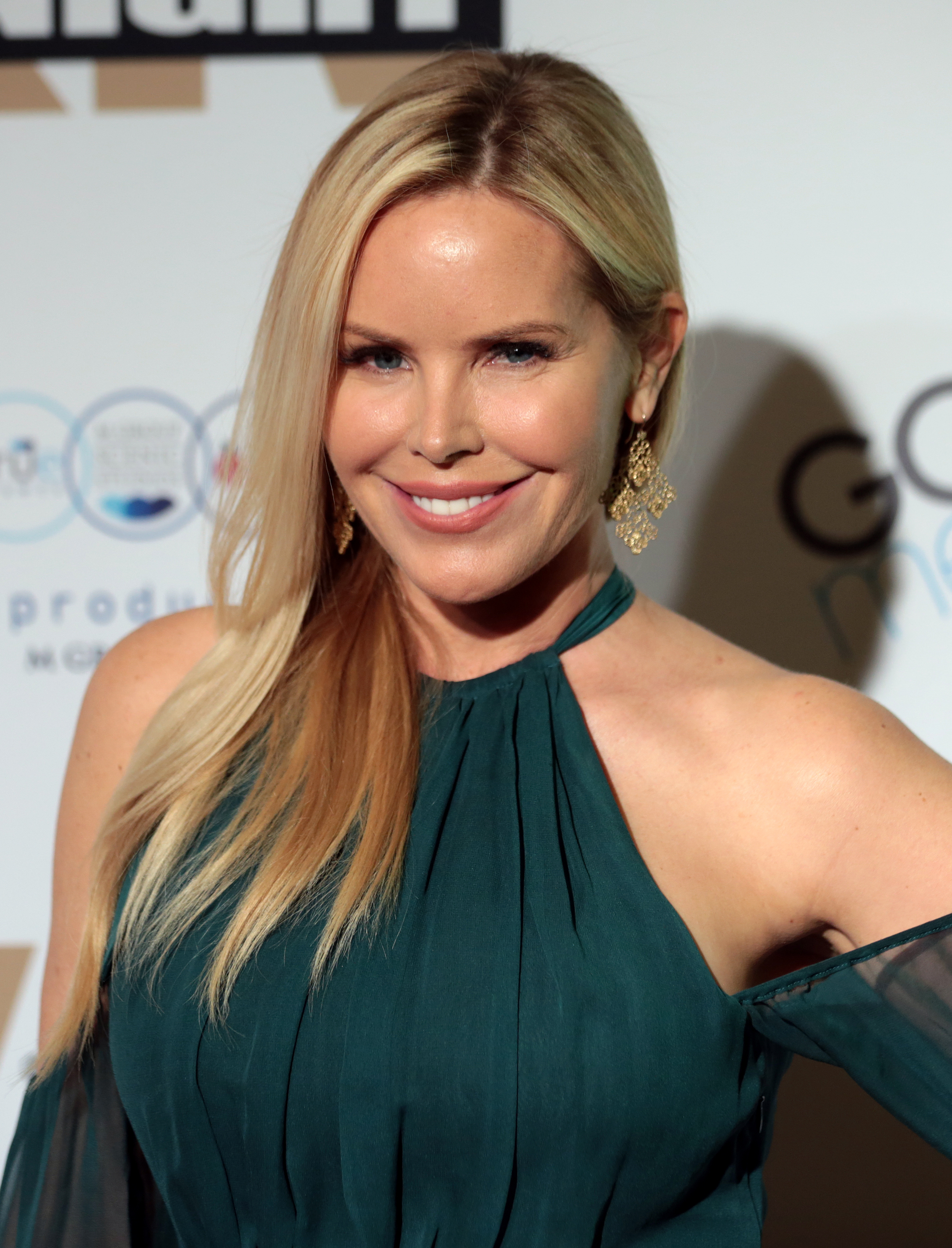
- Nolin in 2018
- Born: November 29, 1971 (age 54); Duluth, Minnesota, U.S.
- Occupations: Actress; model; television personality
- Years active: 1987–present
- Spouses: Greg Fahlman (m. 1993; div. 2001) Cale Hulse (m. 2004)
- Children: 3

Gena Lee Nolin (born November 29, 1971) is an American actress. She is known for her television appearances on The Price Is Right and Baywatch in the 1990s. During the early 2000s she played the lead role in Sheena.

== Early life ==
Nolin and her family moved to Las Vegas, Nevada in her senior year of high school.

== Career ==
In Las Vegas, she won numerous beauty contests, including Ford Models and Elite Model Management's regional "Look of the Year" contests, and the Miss Barbizon USA national title. She appeared in commercials for The Home Depot, Starburst and Hyundai. She has been the spokesperson for Sasson Jeans, Clothestime, Maui & Sons, Levi's and Swatch. In 1994, she became one of the models on the game show The Price Is Right. Soon afterward Nolin appeared in the soap opera The Young and the Restless as a model named Sandy.

In 1995, Nolin starred as Neely Capshaw in the television series Baywatch. Later in the year Nolin began modelling for the first time since her pregnancy for Maxim. In 1998, Nolin quit Baywatch and starred in her own TV show, Sheena, from 2000 to 2002. In 2001, Nolin posed nude for the Christmas edition of Playboy after turning the magazine down several times.

She was in a music video with Billy Currington called "I Got a Feelin'"; it received a CMT Flame Worthy Award nomination for Best Celebrity Cameo.

=== Magazine appearances ===
She has appeared in men's magazines such as Maxim, Stuff, Playboy, and FHM. In 2001, she was listed as one of FHM's sexiest women in the world.

=== Books ===
Nolin released her first book with Simon & Schuster titled Beautiful Inside and Out, Conquering Thyroid Disease with a Healthy, Happy, "Thyroid Sexy" Life, in October 2013. The book landed at No. 1 on Amazon and Barnes & Noble Top 5 Health Books.

== Personal life ==
She married Greg Fahlman on November 27, 1993. They have a son. In 2001, Nolin divorced Fahlman and married former NHL hockey player Cale Hulse in 2004. Nolin and Hulse have two children.

== Filmography ==
=== As actress ===
Year	Title	Role	Notes
1996	Zig and Zag's Dirty Deeds	Gena Lee Nolin	Episode: "Still Desperately Seeking Swimming Trunks"
1995–1998	Baywatch	Neely Capshaw	64 episodes
1996	The Young and the Restless	Sandy	
1998	Baywatch: White Thunder at Glacier Bay	Neely Capshaw	Film
1999	The Underground Comedy Movie	Marylin	Film
2000	The Flunky	Sondra	
2000–2002	Sheena	Sheena	35 episodes; Also as performer: "FSU Fight Song"
2003	Baywatch: Hawaiian Wedding	Neely Capshaw	Television film
2016	Sharknado: The 4th Awakens	Neely Capshaw	Television film
2017	Killing Hasselhoff	Gena Lee Nolin	Film

=== As herself ===
Year	Title	Role	Notes
1994–1995	The Price Is Right	Model	214 episodes
1996	Real Men Don't Watch Pre-Game	Hostess	Television special
1996	MTV Rock N' Jock Basketball VI	Hostess	Television special
1996	The 50th Anniversary of the Bikini	Host	Television special
1996–1999	TFI Friday	Herself	3 episodes
1997	MTV Europe Music Awards 1997	Presenter	Television special
1998	That's Incredible!	Hostess	Television film
2001–2004	Hollywood Squares	Panelist	40 episodes
2002–2003	Pet Star	Celebrity Judge	4 episodes
2002	Miss Universe 2002	Judge	Television special
2002	Fear Factor	Herself	Episode: "Celebrity Fear Factor 3"
2003	The 17th Annual Genesis Awards	Host	Television special
2004	The Sharon Osbourne Show	Guest Co-Host	Episode: "Episode dated 13 February 2004"
2004	ElimiDate	Hostess	Episode: "Episode dated 27 February 2004"
2010	Celebrity Ghost Stories	Herself	Episode: "Don Most/Gena Lee Nolin/Fred Willard/Lolita Davidovich"
2010	Comedy Central Roast	Herself	Episode: "Roast – David Hasselhoff"
2014	Hell's Kitchen	Restaurant Patron	Episode: "11 Chefs Compete, Part 2"
2015	Oprah: Where Are They Now?	Herself	Episode: "Baywatch"
2017	Battle of the Network Stars	Contestant	Episode: "TV Lifeguards vs. Trouble Makers"
2022	The Doctors	Herself	Episode: "Baywatch Beauty Opens Up about Eating Disorder and Aging in Hollywood"
