= Chris Higgins (ice hockey) =

American ice hockey player (born 1983)

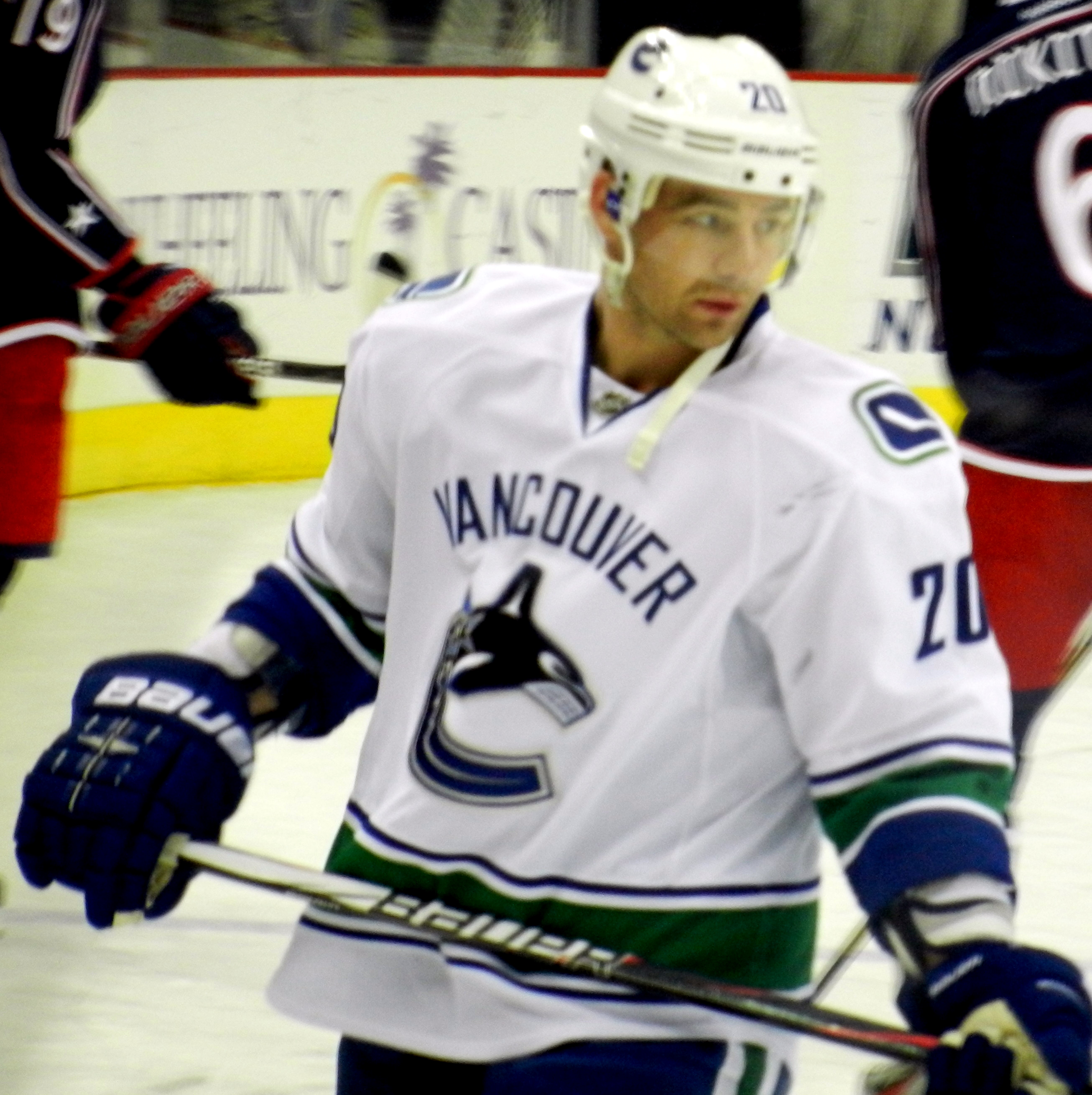
- Higgins with the Vancouver Canucks in December 2011
- Born: June 2, 1983 (age 43) Smithtown, New York, U.S.
- Height: 6 ft 0 in (183 cm)
- Weight: 203 lb (92 kg; 14 st 7 lb)
- Position: Left wing
- Shot: Left
- Played for: Montreal Canadiens; New York Rangers; Calgary Flames; Florida Panthers; Vancouver Canucks
- National team: United States
- NHL draft: 14th overall, 2002; Montreal Canadiens
- Playing career: 2003–2016

Christopher Robert Higgins (born June 2, 1983) is an American professional ice hockey coach and former player who is the skills and development coach for the Vancouver Canucks of the National Hockey League (NHL). While playing college hockey, he was selected 14th overall by the Montreal Canadiens in the first round of the 2002 NHL entry draft. He finished a two-year career with the Yale Bulldogs, earning ECAC Hockey Player of the Year honors as a sophomore, before turning professional for the 2003–04 season. After two seasons with the Canadiens' minor league affiliate, the Hamilton Bulldogs of the American Hockey League (AHL), he joined the NHL in 2005–06. He recorded three consecutive 20-goal seasons to begin his NHL career before being traded to the New York Rangers in June 2009. After brief stints with the Rangers, Calgary Flames and Florida Panthers, he joined the Vancouver Canucks in February 2011. Internationally, Higgins has competed for the United States in two World Junior Championships (2002 and 2003) and one World Championship (2009).

== Playing career ==
=== Amateur career (1998–2003) ===
Higgins played four years of high school hockey for Avon Old Farms, a preparatory school in Avon, Connecticut, graduating in 2001. He then opted to play in the National Collegiate Athletic Association (NCAA) with the Yale Bulldogs. Higgins also considered offers from Boston College and Harvard University. In 2001–02, Higgins began a two-year stint with the Yale Bulldogs of the ECAC Hockey Conference. After recording a team-leading 31 points (14 goals and 17 assists) over 27 games as a freshman, he was named the ECAC Rookie of the Year. He additionally received ECAC All-Rookie and Second All-Star Team honors.

In the off-season, Higgins was selected 14th overall by the Montreal Canadiens in the 2002 NHL entry draft. He became the first ECAC Hockey player to be selected in the first round of the NHL entry draft since Normand Lacombe in 1983 (the Buffalo Sabres selected him 10th overall). Returning to Yale for one more season, he improved to 41 points over 28 games, leading his team in scoring for the second consecutive year. Higgins earned ECAC Player of the Year (co-recipient with Cornell Big Red goaltender David LeNeveu) and First All-Star Team honors; he was also recognized regionally on the NCAA East All-American Team.

=== Montreal Canadiens (2003–2009) ===
Following his sophomore year, he signed a three-year, entry-level contract with the Canadiens on May 22, 2003. Higgins made his NHL debut on October 11, 2003, registering three minutes of ice time in a 4–0 win against the Toronto Maple Leafs. Struggling to play his way onto the Canadiens' lineup, he was often made a healthy scratch (non-dressing player) in October before being assigned to the team's minor league affiliate, the Hamilton Bulldogs of the American Hockey League (AHL), by the end of the month. He recorded 48 points over 67 AHL games in 2003–04, ranking fifth in team scoring. Due to the 2004–05 NHL lockout, Higgins automatically remained in Hamilton and improved to 51 points, ranking third among Bulldogs scorers.

The following season, as NHL play resumed, Higgins made the Canadiens' roster out of training camp. He scored his first career NHL goal on October 6, 2005, against New York Rangers goalie Kevin Weekes during an away game at Madison Square Garden. The Canadiens won the contest 4–3 in overtime. He finished the season with 23 goals, ranking seventh among league rookies, and 15 assists for a total of 38 points.

A month into the 2006–07 season, Higgins suffered a sprained left ankle during a game against the New Jersey Devils. At the time of the injury, on November 4, 2006, he was leading the Canadiens with eight goals. Sidelined for 6 weeks, Higgins was limited to 61 games, though still managed to match his previous season's points total with 22 goals and 16 assists. Set to become a restricted free agent in the off-season, Montreal re-signed Higgins to a two-year, US$3.4 million deal on June 25, 2007. Prior to the start of the 2007–08 season, Higgins was named an alternate captain for the Canadiens. He went on to have a career season with personal bests of 27 goals, 25 assists and 52 points. On November 11, 2008, Higgins recorded his first NHL hat-trick in a 4–0 win over the Ottawa Senators. However, his points total decreased in his fourth NHL campaign with 23 points over 57 games.

=== Rangers, Flames and Panthers (2009–2011) ===
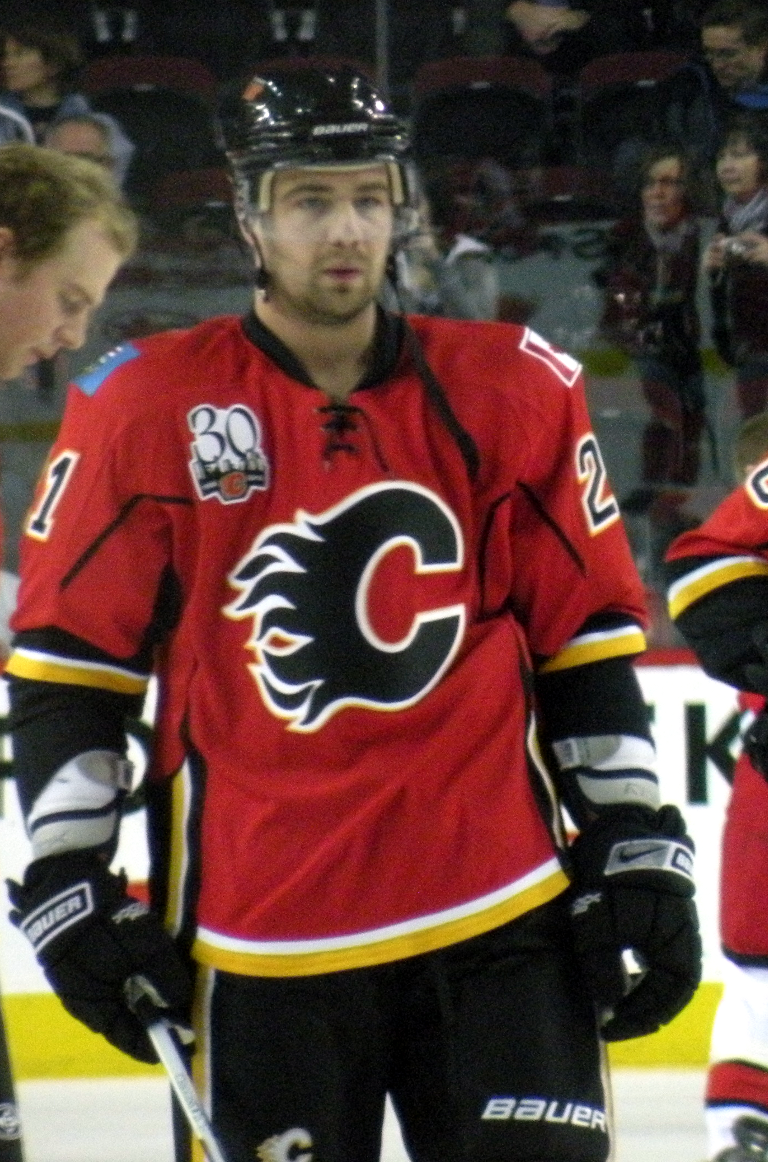
Higgins while a member of the Calgary Flames in February 2010

Coming off what was the lowest statistical season of his career, he was traded by the Canadiens, along with Ryan McDonagh, Pavel Valentenko and Doug Janik, to the New York Rangers in exchange for Scott Gomez, Tom Pyatt and Michael Busto on June 30, 2009. A restricted free agent at the time of the trade, he agreed to a one-year, US$2.25 contract with the Rangers six days later. He scored his first goal with the Rangers on November 3, 2009, against the Vancouver Canucks, his team's lone marker in a 4–1 loss. His offensive struggles continued in New York (he recorded 15 points in 55 games) and he was subsequently traded to the Calgary Flames on February 2, 2010, along with Aleš Kotalík, in exchange for Olli Jokinen and Brandon Prust. He scored his first goal with the Flames on March 9, an empty netter, in a 4–1 win against the Detroit Red Wings. Two days later, he suffered a foot injury that sidelined him for the remaining 14 games of the regular season. Splitting the season between New York and Calgary, he had eight goals and 17 points over 67 games.

Becoming an unrestricted free agent in the off-season, Higgins signed a one-year, US$1.6 million deal with the Florida Panthers on July 2, 2010. He had considered re-signing with Calgary, but cited new Florida Panthers General Manager Dale Tallon's experience as a strong factor for joining Florida (Tallon was largely responsible for assembling the Chicago Blackhawks team that won the Stanley Cup the previous season). In December 2010, he was sidelined four games with a staphylococcal infection in his foot, an injury that was misdiagnosed first as "skate bite," (Note: A colloquial term describing symptoms that include pain and swelling around the ankle as a result of excessively tight or stiff skates.) then a spider bite. Higgins later missed an additional seven games the following month with a hamstring injury.

=== Vancouver Canucks (2011–2016) ===
With the Panthers out of playoff contention late in the season, the team began trading away numerous veterans and core players. At the NHL trade deadline, on February 28, 2011, Higgins was dealt to the Vancouver Canucks in exchange for defensive prospect Evan Oberg and a third-round draft pick in 2013. The Canucks had reportedly been interested in a different Panthers player, but with a minute left until the trade deadline, Panthers Assistant General Manager Mike Santos called the Canucks back and offered Higgins. In 48 games with the Panthers, he had recorded 11 goals and 23 points. Injured with a hand injury at the time of the trade, he did not debut with the Canucks until March 10. He scored his first two goals as a Canuck on March 27 in a 4–1 win against the Columbus Blue Jackets. He completed the season with 13 goals and 28 points in 62 games between Florida and Vancouver. While Higgins played the majority of the regular season with the Canucks as a bottom-six forward, by the playoffs, he was playing on the second line with Ryan Kesler and Mason Raymond. Entering the post-season as the Presidents' Trophy champions, the Canucks held the first seed in the West. After eliminating the Chicago Blackhawks, Nashville Predators and San Jose Sharks in the first three rounds, the Canucks advanced to the Stanley Cup Finals. Facing the Boston Bruins, the series went to a seventh game, which the Canucks lost 4–0. Following the Canucks' game seven defeat, it was revealed that several Canucks players had been playing with injuries, including Higgins. His injury occurred in game five of the second round against the Predators, when he blocked a Kevin Klein shot with his skate, breaking his left foot. Over 25 playoff games, Higgins recorded four goals and eight points. Three of his goals were game-winners, tying him with Geoff Courtnall (1994) for the most in a single playoff season by a Canucks player.

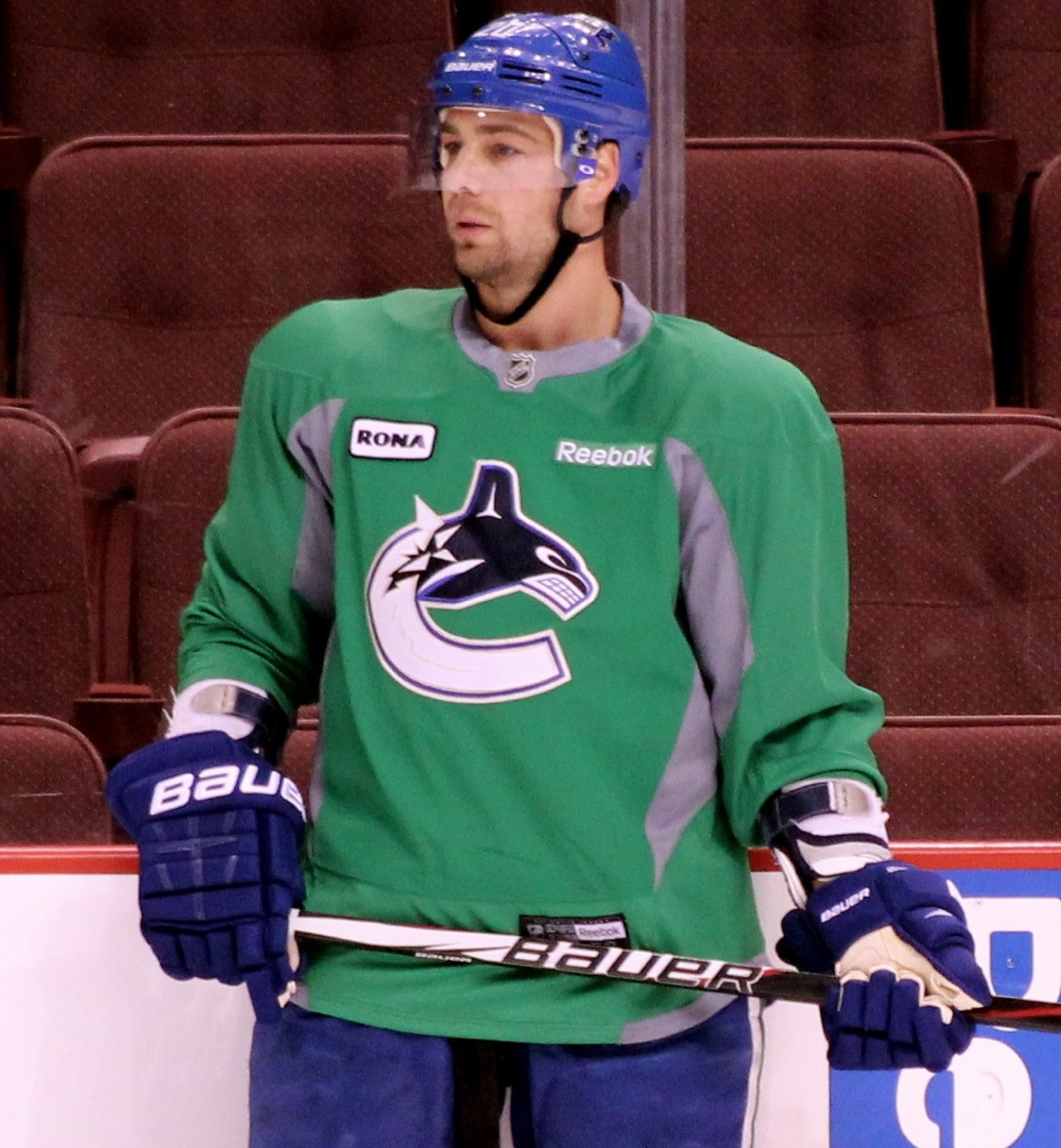
Higgins during a Canucks practice in March 2012

During the off-season, Higgins re-signed with Vancouver to a two-year, $3.8 million contract on July 1, 2011. The deal was agreed upon prior to his scheduled unrestricted free agency. During the season, Higgins struggled with two bouts of staph infection, one in December 2011 and the other in February 2012. He missed a combined 11 games as a result of swelling and suffering from severe side effects to the associated medication. Though he missed time, Higgins also played through the adverse reactions for several games following both bouts with the infection. Through the first half of the season, he often played on the second line with Kesler and newcomer David Booth; the trio were dubbed the "American Express Line," as they were all born in the United States. Towards the end of the season, he was consistently placed on the team's third line, a defensive shutdown unit with fellow two-way forwards Jannik Hansen and deadline-acquisition Samuel Påhlsson. Used in both roles over the campaign, Higgins was often recognized as the team's most consistent and hardest-working forward. On the last day of the regular season, he was accordingly awarded the Fred J. Hume Award, voted by fans as the team's "unsung hero." Appearing in 71 games, Higgins recorded 43 points (18 goals and 25 assists), his highest total in four years and fifth among team forwards.

On April 2, 2013, Higgins signed a four-year, $10 million extension with the Canucks.

During the 2015–16 season, on January 12, 2016, Higgins was put on waivers after unsuccessful attempts to trade the winger. He cleared waivers the next day and was sent down to the Utica Comets, the AHL affiliate of the Canucks. On March 19, 2016, Higgins was recalled by the Vancouver Canucks after multiple injuries occurred on both the Canucks and Comets rosters. He would finish the season with the Canucks.

In the off-season, on June 27, 2016, Higgins's tenure in Vancouver ended when he was placed on waivers by the Canucks for the intention of buying out the remaining year of his contract. On August 30, 2016, unable to secure an NHL contract, Higgins signed a PTO to attend training camp with former club, the Calgary Flames. On October 10, Higgins was released from his tryout.

== International play ==
Higgins played in back-to-back World Junior Championships during his college career. First appearing in 2002, he recorded four goals and two assists over seven games. He helped the United States qualify for the quarterfinal, where they were eliminated by Russia 6–1. The following year, Higgins matched his points total with three goals and three assists. After losing their semifinal to Canada 3–2, the United States lost by the same score to Finland in the bronze medal game.

Higgins made his first international appearance for the American men's team at the 2009 IIHF World Championship. He scored his only goal of the tournament in a 4–3 overtime loss to Switzerland in the qualifying round. After losing their semifinal game to Russia, the United States lost the bronze medal to Sweden by a 4–2 score.

== Coaching career ==
On September 11, 2019, it was announced that Higgins had returned to the Vancouver Canucks organization to serve as an assistant director of player development. On December 23, 2020, the Canucks announced they had reassigned Higgins to serve as the team's Skills and Development Coach.

== Playing style ==
Listed at 6 feet (1.8 meters) tall and 203 pounds (92 kilograms), Higgins plays mostly in the style of a power forward. He is known as a two-way player with good skating, capable of contributing offensively while remaining defensively responsible. He has alternated between playing the wing and center positions. Early in his career, he was compared to Dallas Stars forward Brenden Morrow.

== Personal life ==
Higgins grew up in Smithtown, New York, the second eldest among five siblings. His father, Robert, is a New York City firefighter and his younger brother is a New York City police officer.

As a youth, Higgins played in the 1996 Quebec International Pee-Wee Hockey Tournament with the Connecticut Yankees minor ice hockey team, and then in the 1997 tournament with the New York Islanders minor team. As a minor, he played on teams with his future Canadiens teammate Mike Komisarek and his future Flames teammate Eric Nystrom, both of whom he remains close friends with. He was a student of Lithuanian hockey coach Aleksey Nikiforov at hockey camps in his teenage years. Though he grew up on Long Island, Higgins was a Montreal Canadiens fan as a child, following after his father; his favorite players on the team were goaltender Patrick Roy and captain Kirk Muller.

Higgins left home to join the high school hockey program of Avon Old Farms in Connecticut. Following his high school graduation, Higgins was enrolled in Yale University for two years, majoring in political science while playing on the school's hockey team.

Higgins has one daughter.

== Career statistics ==
=== Regular season and playoffs ===
			Regular season					Playoffs
Season	Team	League	GP	G	A	Pts	PIM	GP	G	A	Pts	PIM
1999–2000	Avon Old Farms	USHS	27	19	20	39	10	—	—	—	—	—
2000–01	Avon Old Farms	USHS	24	22	13	35	12	—	—	—	—	—
2001–02	Yale University	ECAC	27	14	17	31	32	—	—	—	—	—
2002–03	Yale University	ECAC	28	20	21	41	41	—	—	—	—	—
2003–04	Hamilton Bulldogs	AHL	67	21	27	48	18	10	3	2	5	0
2003–04	Montreal Canadiens	NHL	2	0	0	0	0	—	—	—	—	—
2004–05	Hamilton Bulldogs	AHL	76	28	23	51	33	4	3	3	6	4
2005–06	Montreal Canadiens	NHL	80	23	15	38	26	6	1	3	4	0
2006–07	Montreal Canadiens	NHL	61	22	16	38	26	—	—	—	—	—
2007–08	Montreal Canadiens	NHL	82	27	25	52	22	12	3	2	5	2
2008–09	Montreal Canadiens	NHL	57	12	11	23	22	4	2	0	2	2
2009–10	New York Rangers	NHL	55	6	8	14	32	—	—	—	—	—
2009–10	Calgary Flames	NHL	12	2	1	3	0	—	—	—	—	—
2010–11	Florida Panthers	NHL	48	11	12	23	10	—	—	—	—	—
2010–11	Vancouver Canucks	NHL	14	2	3	5	6	25	4	4	8	2
2011–12	Vancouver Canucks	NHL	71	18	25	43	16	5	0	0	0	2
2012–13	Vancouver Canucks	NHL	41	10	5	15	10	4	0	0	0	0
2013–14	Vancouver Canucks	NHL	78	17	22	39	30	—	—	—	—	—
2014–15	Vancouver Canucks	NHL	77	12	24	36	16	6	1	1	2	2
2015–16	Vancouver Canucks	NHL	33	3	1	4	4	—	—	—	—	—
2015–16	Utica Comets	AHL	22	9	4	13	8	—	—	—	—	—
NHL totals			711	165	168	333	220	62	11	10	21	10

=== International ===
Year	Team	Event	Result	GP	G	A	Pts	PIM
2002	United States	WJC	5th	7	4	2	6	6
2003	United States	WJC	4th	7	3	3	6	4
2009	United States	WC	4th	6	1	0	1	2
Junior totals				14	7	5	12	10
Senior totals				6	1	0	1	2

== Awards and honors ==
Award	Year
All-ECAC Hockey Rookie Team	2001–02
All-ECAC Hockey Second Team	2001–02
All-ECAC Hockey First Team	2002–03
AHCA East First-Team All-American	2002–03

== Notes ==
Awards and achievements
Preceded by Rob McFeeters	ECAC Hockey Rookie of the Year; 2001–02	Succeeded by Hugh Jessiman
Preceded by Marc Cavosie	ECAC Hockey Player of the Year; 2002–03 shared with David LeNeveu	Succeeded by Yann Danis
Preceded by Alexander Perezhogin	Montreal Canadiens first-round draft pick 2002	Succeeded by Andrei Kostitsyn
