= Mike Komisarek =

American ice hockey player (born 1982)

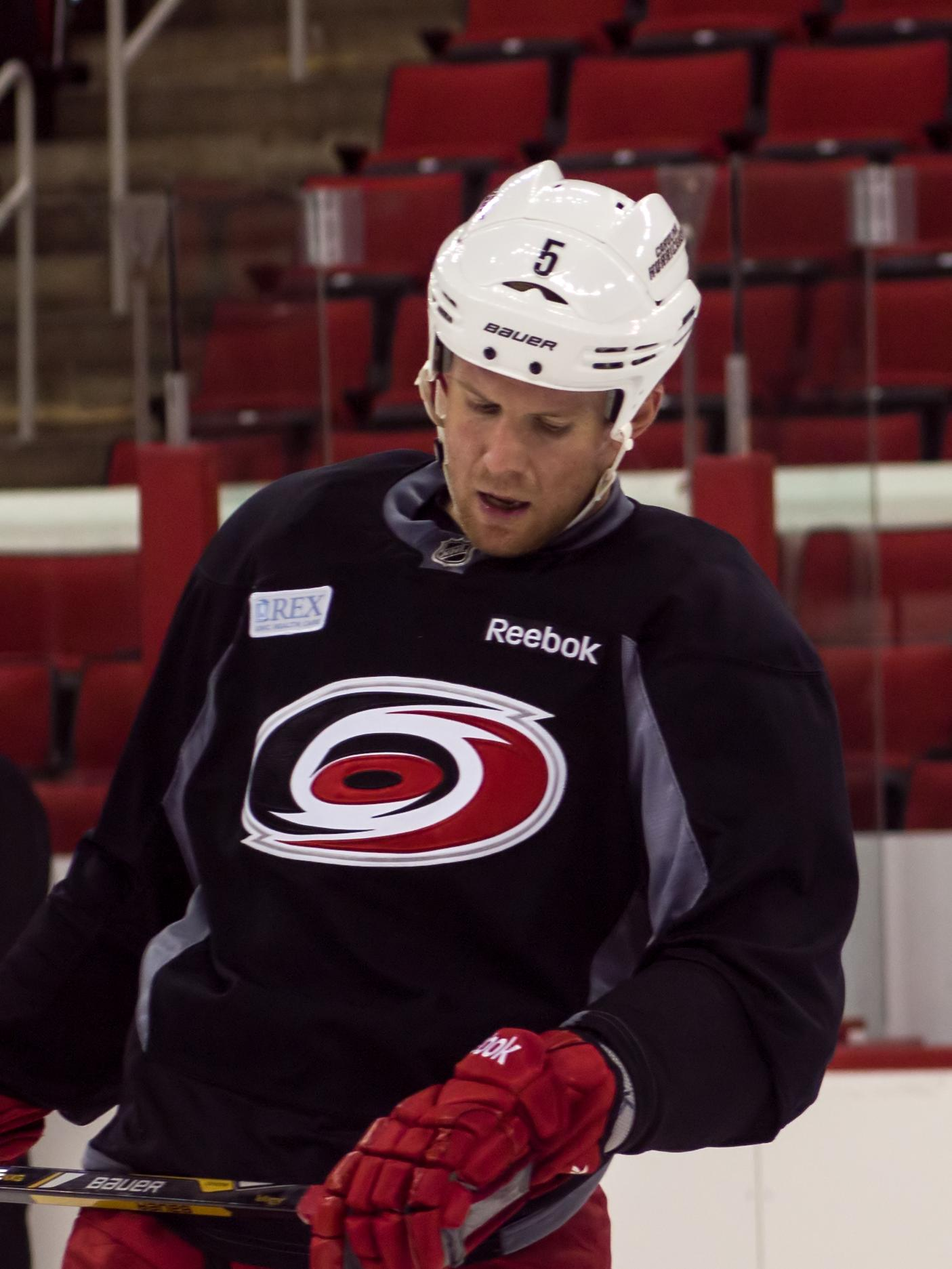
- Komisarek with the Carolina Hurricanes in 2013
- Born: January 19, 1982 (age 44) West Islip, New York, U.S.
- Height: 6 ft 4 in (193 cm)
- Weight: 243 lb (110 kg; 17 st 5 lb)
- Position: Defense
- Shot: Right
- Played for: Montreal Canadiens; Toronto Maple Leafs; Carolina Hurricanes
- National team: United States
- NHL draft: 7th overall, 2001; Montreal Canadiens
- Playing career: 2002–2014

Michael Komisarek (born January 19, 1982) is an American former professional ice hockey defenseman. He was selected seventh overall by the Montreal Canadiens in the 2001 NHL entry draft. Komisarek also played for the Toronto Maple Leafs and Carolina Hurricanes.

== Playing career ==
=== Amateur ===
As a youth, Komisarek played in the 1996 Quebec International Pee-Wee Hockey Tournament with the New York Islanders minor ice hockey team.

Komisarek began playing competitively on Long Island, New York, starting off in the Suffolk PAL organization. He played two years of Varsity hockey at St. Anthony's High School. He then played for the New England Jr. Coyotes of the Eastern Junior Hockey League (EJHL) under legendary coach Gary Dineen. He was then picked up by USA Hockey's National Team Development Program. He is a student of the respected Lithuanian hockey coach Aleksey Nikiforov.

=== College ===
Komisarek played two seasons at the University of Michigan, compiling 46 points and 145 penalty minutes in 80 games. He helped the Wolverines men's ice hockey team to a 55–24–10 mark, a Central Collegiate Hockey Association (CCHA) title and two trips to the NCAA Men's Ice Hockey Championship. One of his teammates was fellow Long Islander Eric Nystrom. Komisarek was also named a First Team Division I All-American by the American Hockey Coaches Association in 2002.

=== Professional ===
After two seasons with the University of Michigan, Komisarek was selected seventh overall in the 2001 NHL entry draft by the Montreal Canadiens. He was signed to a contract by the team on July 24, 2002. He played his first NHL game in the 2002–03 season with the Canadiens. He re-signed with the Canadiens in 2007 for a two-year, $3.5 million, along with his friend Chris Higgins, who is also from Long Island.

Komisarek scored his first NHL goal on March 20, 2006, against the Washington Capitals, where he was named the first star of the game. His willingness to stand up for his teammates and his hard-hitting style made him a fan favorite in the Bell Centre.

In the 2006–07 season, Komisarek tied Mike Commodore of the Calgary Flames for most shorthanded goals scored by a defenseman with two.

During the 2007–08 season, Komisarek led the league with 227 blocked shots and finished second in hits with 266 having played only 75 games.

On January 5, 2009, Komisarek played in the NHL All-Star Game, where he was named a starter as voted by the fans alongside his Canadiens defense partner, Andrei Markov.

In July 2009, Komisarek signed a five-year contract with the Toronto Maple Leafs worth an average of $4.5 million per season. On January 2, 2010, Komisarek injured his shoulder in a game against the Calgary Flames, and on February 3, it was revealed that he would require season-ending surgery. This also meant Komisarek would miss the 2010 Winter Olympics, as he was chosen to represent United States.

On March 20, 2013, Komisarek was placed on waivers by the Maple Leafs. On March 21, 2013, he cleared waivers and with his permission was assigned to the Maple Leafs' American Hockey League (AHL) affiliate, the Toronto Marlies, for the remainder of the 2012–13 season. With one year left on his contract with the Maple Leafs, Komisarek was released as a free agent after his contract was used in a compliance buy-out on July 2, 2013.

On July 5, 2013, as a free agent, Komisarek signed a one-year, $700,000 contract with the Carolina Hurricanes.

In September 2014, Komisarek was signed to a professional try-out (PTO) contract by the New Jersey Devils, but was released from it shortly after.

== Personal life ==
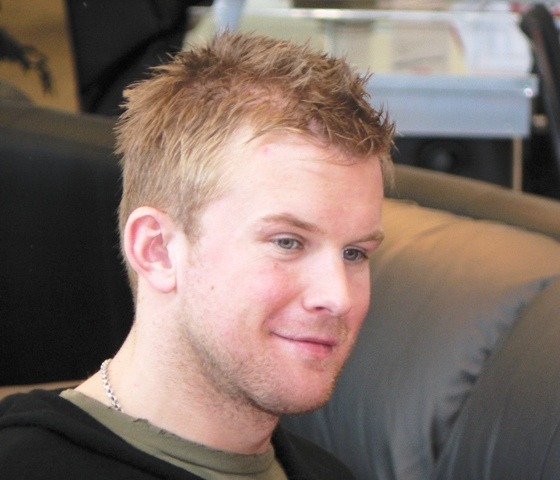
Komisarek at a signing event in Laval, Quebec in 2008

Komisarek is of Polish descent. His father, Roman Komisarek, was 24 when he moved to the United States, where he eventually opened an auto-body repair shop on Long Island. Roman Komisarek left his wife Kathy behind in Poland until he could earn enough to afford an apartment and support her. Komisarek stated that, "At that time, my parents knew they wanted to start a family and give me and my sister a better opportunity. [...](My father) moved to Brooklyn, found a job and didn't know the language at all. He just had the clothes on his back. Now, we have a nice home on Long Island, and my parents provided everything we ever needed. I always carried that with me. I always wanted to make them proud." Komisarek also has a sister named Joanne, who is two years younger than he is. His sister is a graduate of Boston College. He also speaks Polish.

Komisarek's mother, Kathy, was diagnosed with pancreatic cancer in January 2005 and died in November 2005. She was 51.

In 2014, Komisarek announced that he would be resuming studies at the University of Michigan through the athletic department's Degree Completion Program. On January 9, 2015, Michigan Wolverines head coach Red Berenson announced that Komisarek would join the coaching staff as an undergraduate student assistant.

== Career statistics ==
=== Regular season and playoffs ===
			Regular season					Playoffs
Season	Team	League	GP	G	A	Pts	PIM	GP	G	A	Pts	PIM
1998–99	New England Jr. Coyotes	EJHL	53	17	24	41	10	—	—	—	—	—
1999–2000	U.S. NTDP Juniors	USHL	51	5	8	13	124	—	—	—	—	—
1999–2000	U.S. NTDP U18	NAHL	1	0	0	0	16	—	—	—	—	—
1999–2000	U.S. NTDP U18	USDP	6	0	0	0	12	—	—	—	—	—
2000–01	University of Michigan	CCHA	41	4	12	16	77	—	—	—	—	—
2001–02	University of Michigan	CCHA	39	11	19	30	68	—	—	—	—	—
2002–03	Hamilton Bulldogs	AHL	56	5	25	30	79	23	1	5	6	60
2002–03	Montreal Canadiens	NHL	21	0	1	1	28	—	—	—	—	—
2003–04	Hamilton Bulldogs	AHL	18	2	7	9	47	—	—	—	—	—
2003–04	Montreal Canadiens	NHL	46	0	4	4	34	7	0	0	0	8
2004–05	Hamilton Bulldogs	AHL	20	1	4	5	49	4	0	1	1	8
2005–06	Montreal Canadiens	NHL	71	2	4	6	116	6	0	0	0	10
2006–07	Montreal Canadiens	NHL	82	4	15	19	96	—	—	—	—	—
2007–08	Montreal Canadiens	NHL	75	4	13	17	101	12	1	2	3	18
2008–09	Montreal Canadiens	NHL	66	2	9	11	121	4	0	0	0	20
2009–10	Toronto Maple Leafs	NHL	34	0	4	4	40	—	—	—	—	—
2010–11	Toronto Maple Leafs	NHL	75	1	9	10	86	—	—	—	—	—
2011–12	Toronto Maple Leafs	NHL	45	1	4	5	41	—	—	—	—	—
2012–13	Toronto Maple Leafs	NHL	4	0	0	0	2	—	—	—	—	—
2012–13	Toronto Marlies	AHL	7	0	0	0	10	6	0	1	1	9
2013–14	Carolina Hurricanes	NHL	32	0	4	4	14	—	—	—	—	—
AHL totals			101	8	36	44	185	33	1	7	8	77
NHL totals			551	14	67	81	679	29	1	2	3	56

=== International ===
Year	Team	Event	Result	GP	G	A	Pts	PIM
2000	United States	WJC18	8th	6	0	0	0	12
2001	United States	WJC	5th	7	0	0	0	0
2002	United States	WJC	5th	7	0	2	2	14
2006	United States	WC	7th	7	0	1	1	4
2011	United States	WC	8th	7	1	1	2	6
Junior totals				20	0	2	2	26
Senior totals				14	1	2	3	10

== Awards and honors ==
Award	Year
College
All-CCHA Rookie Team	2000–01
All-CCHA First Team	2001–02
CCHA Best Defensive Defenseman	2001–02
AHCA West First-Team All-American	2001–02
CCHA All-Tournament Team	2002
AHL
All-Rookie Team	2002–03
NHL
All-Star Game	2009

Awards and achievements
Preceded by Marcel Hossa	Montreal Canadiens first-round draft pick 2001	Succeeded by Alexander Perezhogin
Sporting positions
Preceded by Andrew Hutchinson	CCHA Best Defensive Defenseman; 2001–02	Succeeded by Brad Fast
