= Cale Hulse =

Canadian ice hockey player

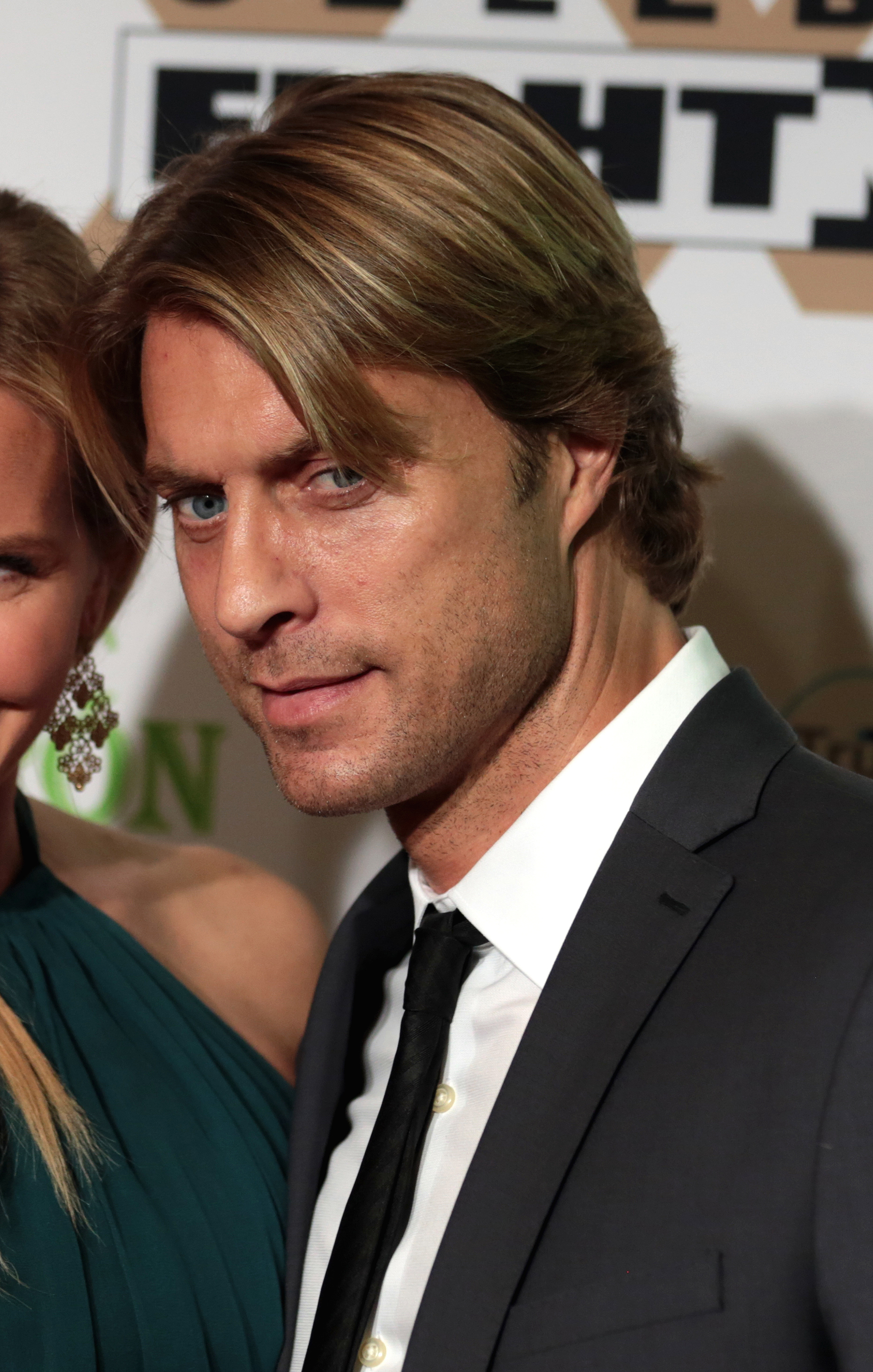
- Born: November 10, 1973 (age 52) Edmonton, Alberta, Canada
- Height: 6 ft 3 in (191 cm)
- Weight: 220 lb (100 kg; 15 st 10 lb)
- Position: Defence
- Shot: Right
- Played for: New Jersey Devils; Calgary Flames; Nashville Predators; Phoenix Coyotes; Columbus Blue Jackets
- NHL draft: 66th overall, 1992; New Jersey Devils
- Playing career: 1993–2006

Cale D. Hulse (born November 10, 1973) is a Canadian former professional ice hockey player in the National Hockey League. He was a defenceman.

== Playing career ==
Hulse was drafted in the 3rd round (66th overall) in the 1992 NHL entry draft by the New Jersey Devils. In 1995, he was on the American Hockey League's Calder Cup championship team, Albany River Rats. On February 26, 1996, he was traded to the Calgary Flames with Tommy Albelin and Jocelyn Lemieux for Phil Housley and Dan Keczmer. On March 14, 2000, he was traded with a 3rd round draft pick in the 2000 NHL entry draft to the Nashville Predators for Sergei Krivokrasov.

Hulse signed as a free agent with the Phoenix Coyotes on July 10, 2003. On October 8, 2005, he was traded with Michael Rupp and Jason Chimera to the Columbus Blue Jackets for Geoff Sanderson and Tim Jackman.

On February 28, 2006, he was traded to the Flames for Cam Severson. Hulse was invited to the Carolina Hurricanes' 2006 training camp as a depth fill-in, but was cut before the season started.

== Personal life ==
Hulse married actress Gena Lee Nolin on September 9, 2004, at the Royal Palms Resort and Spa in Phoenix, Arizona. Their son was born on April 15, 2006, in Scottsdale, Arizona. On December 3, 2008, Hulse and Nolin had their second child. Hulse has a daughter from a previous relationship, and is step-father to Nolin's son from her former marriage.

Hulse is the namesake of Colorado Avalanche defenseman Cale Makar; Makar was born in Calgary during Hulse's tenure with the Flames.

== Career statistics ==
| | | | Regular season | | | | | Playoffs |
| Season | Team | League | GP | G | A | Pts | PIM | GP | G | A | Pts | PIM |
|---|---|---|---|---|---|---|---|---|---|---|---|---|
| 1990–91 | Calgary Royals | AJHL | 49 | 3 | 23 | 26 | 220 | — | — | — | — | — |
| 1991–92 | Portland Winterhawks | WHL | 70 | 4 | 18 | 22 | 250 | 6 | 0 | 2 | 2 | 27 |
| 1992–93 | Portland Winterhawks | WHL | 72 | 10 | 26 | 36 | 284 | 16 | 4 | 4 | 8 | 65 |
| 1993–94 | Albany River Rats | AHL | 79 | 7 | 14 | 21 | 186 | 5 | 0 | 3 | 3 | 11 |
| 1994–95 | Albany River Rats | AHL | 77 | 5 | 13 | 18 | 215 | 12 | 1 | 1 | 2 | 17 |
| 1995–96 | New Jersey Devils | NHL | 8 | 0 | 0 | 0 | 15 | — | — | — | — | — |
| 1995–96 | Albany River Rats | AHL | 42 | 4 | 23 | 27 | 107 | — | — | — | — | — |
| 1995–96 | Calgary Flames | NHL | 3 | 0 | 0 | 0 | 5 | 1 | 0 | 0 | 0 | 0 |
| 1995–96 | Saint John Flames | AHL | 13 | 2 | 7 | 9 | 39 | — | — | — | — | — |
| 1996–97 | Calgary Flames | NHL | 63 | 1 | 6 | 7 | 91 | — | — | — | — | — |
| 1997–98 | Calgary Flames | NHL | 79 | 5 | 22 | 27 | 169 | — | — | — | — | — |
| 1998–99 | Calgary Flames | NHL | 73 | 3 | 9 | 12 | 117 | — | — | — | — | — |
| 1999–00 | Calgary Flames | NHL | 47 | 1 | 6 | 7 | 47 | — | — | — | — | — |
| 2000–01 | Nashville Predators | NHL | 82 | 1 | 7 | 8 | 128 | — | — | — | — | — |
| 2001–02 | Nashville Predators | NHL | 63 | 0 | 2 | 2 | 121 | — | — | — | — | — |
| 2002–03 | Nashville Predators | NHL | 80 | 2 | 6 | 8 | 121 | — | — | — | — | — |
| 2003–04 | Phoenix Coyotes | NHL | 82 | 3 | 17 | 20 | 123 | — | — | — | — | — |
| 2005–06 | Columbus Blue Jackets | NHL | 27 | 0 | 3 | 3 | 43 | — | — | — | — | — |
| 2005–06 | Calgary Flames | NHL | 12 | 0 | 1 | 1 | 20 | — | — | — | — | — |
| NHL totals | | | 619 | 16 | 79 | 95 | 1000 | 1 | 0 | 0 | 0 | 0 |

== Awards and honours ==
| Award | Year |
|---|---|
AHL
| Calder Cup (Albany River Rats) | 1995 |
