= Aleksey Nikiforov =

Lithuanian ice hockey player and coach

- Born: 27 April 1957 (age 69); Vilnius, Lithuanian SSR, Soviet Union
- Occupation: Ice hockey coach
- Years active: 1980–present
- Children: Vladimir Nikiforov
- Website: http://coachaleksey.com/

Aleksey Nikiforov (born 27 April 1957) is a Lithuanian ice hockey coach and former player for Dinamo Riga. He is the father of Quad City Storm winger Vladimir Nikiforov. He resides on Long Island and coaches in Hauppauge, New York.

== Early life ==
Nikiforov was born in 1957 in Vilnius, Lithuania, to a military family. They later relocated to Riga, Latvia, and there he started playing ice hockey around the age of 7. Nikiforov's first ice hockey stick "consisted of two broken pieces his father scavenged from a local rink and screwed, then taped together." His skates "were bought by his mother on the Soviet Union's black market."

During his time in Riga, Nikiforov played for Dinamo Riga from the peewee age bracket up to the elite level. He eventually made the junior national team and played briefly at a professional level before recognizing that his future lay in coaching.

== Coaching career ==
In 1980, Nikiforov moved back to Vilnius and took up a coaching position in the town of Elektrėnai. During his time coaching in Lithuania, he was instrumental in the development of Dainius Zubrus and Darius Kasparaitis, who would go on to play in the NHL. In 1987, Nikiforov was invited to attend a coaching development program in Moscow, which was led by ice hockey legend Anatoly Tarasov.

By 1991, Nikiforov had immigrated to the United States, settling on Long Island with his wife, while his parents cared for his two young children in Minsk. He took construction work in Manhattan, until a short coaching stint with Roger Neilson of the New York Rangers, after which he was offered a position at the Rinx, a large recreation complex on Long Island in the town of Hauppague, New York, by Gerry Hart, a former player for the New York Islanders. He was initially employed as a handy man but eventually given the chance to run clinics for students on the ice each morning.

At the Rinx, Nikiforov coached a number of teams, including the PAL Jr. Islanders 16U AAA team and the New York Bobcats of the Atlantic Junior Hockey League. Nikiforov's work at PAL Ice Hockey included a stint as the skills and development coach for the organization. Nikiforov also runs ice hockey camp and clinics at the Rinx.

Although much of his time since the 1980s has been spent in the United States, Nikiforov has frequently returned to Lithuania, and in 2017 and 2018 he was the head coach of the Lithuanian U18 National Team and the head coach of the U20 National Team in 2019.

== Notable students ==
Over the years, Nikiforov has coached a number of notable ice hockey players:

- Matt Gilroy
- Chris Higgins
- Mike Komisarek
- Rob Scuderi
- Darius Kasparaitis
- Dainius Zubrus
- Tony Romano
- Vladimir Malahov
- Brian McCabe
- Eric Nystrom
- Ryan Vesce
- James Marcou
- Alexei Yashin
- Dana Trivigno
- Uwe Krupp
- Bobby Trivigno
