= Maui and Sons =

American retail company

Maui and Sons, Inc.
- Company type: Private
- Industry: Retail
- Founded: 1980; 46 years ago
- Founder: Jeff Yokoyama
- Headquarters: Malibu, California, United States
- Area served: North America, South America, Asia, Central America, Europe, Australia
- Key people: Richard Harrington (CEO) and Rick Rietveld (Chairman)
- Products: Clothing
- Revenue: ▲US$200 million
- Website: www.mauiandsons.com

Maui and Sons, Inc. (abbreviated Maui & Sons) is an American surf and skateboard apparel company which specializes in surfwear and skater clothing products. The clothing, equipment and other products are designed for snowboarders, skateboarders and surfers.

The company also produces a line of apparel for women and children under the licenses "Maui Girl", "Maui Kids", and "Maui Princess".

== History ==
Maui and Sons was established by three surfers from Malibu, California in 1980. Having previously tried various businesses that failed (including a cookie company), the group decided to create a surf apparel brand, and named it "Maui & Sons." The company's namesake is the Hawaiian island of Maui.

In 1989, Maui & Sons was sold to Richard Harrington.

Years later, an agreement would be reached between Cherokee and Maui & Sons, to expand sales of the brand into most parts of the United States and Canada.

The company logo is based on the old cookie company's business logo, "Maui's Chocolate Chip."
