= Pyotr Vorobyov =

Russian ice hockey player and coach

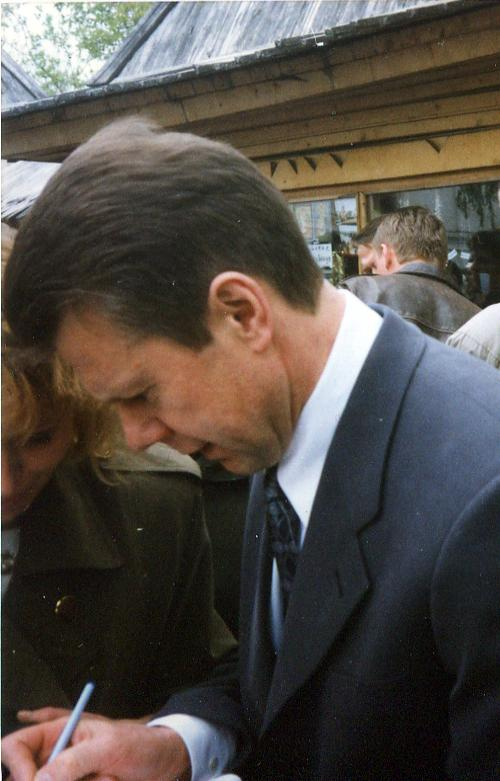
- Born: 28 January 1949 (age 76); Moscow, Russia
- Height: 5 ft 10 in (178 cm)
- Weight: 183 lb (83 kg; 13 st 1 lb)
- Position: Centre
- Shot: Left
- Played for: Dinamo Riga; Latvijas Berzs
- Playing career: 1968–1980

Pyotr Ilyich Vorobyov (Russian: Пётр Ильич Воробьёв; Latvian: Pjotrs Vorobjovs; born 28 January 1949) is a Russian professional ice hockey coach and former player. Vorobyov was the head coach of the gold medal winning CIS men's national junior ice hockey team in 1992.

== Playing career ==
Vorobyov played in the Soviet Championship League for Dinamo Riga (1968–79).

== Coaching career ==
Vorobyov was an assistant coach for Dinamo Riga from 1982 to 1989. From 1990 to 1992, he was an assistant coach for Dynamo Moscow, but in the 1992–93 season, he became their head coach.

Vorobiev was the only coach of the CIS men's national junior ice hockey team during the 1992 World Junior Ice Hockey Championships where his team won the gold medal.

After that, Vorobyov was the head coach for Frankfurt Lions, Torpedo Yaroslavl (as Lokomotiv Yaroslavl was known then), Lokomotiv Yaroslavl, and Lada Togliatti.

In 2006, Vorobyov became the head coach of the Latvia men's national ice hockey team.

Next, he returned to the Russian Superleague to coach Khimik Mytischy and Torpedo Nizhny Novgorod. When the Kontinental Hockey League began, he managed to reach the 1/8 final with Lada Togliatti.

On 8 February 2010, he resigned from coaching Lada to return to Yaroslavl to coach Lokomotiv Yaroslavl once again. At the end of the season, he was hired to coach the junior team Loko of the Russian Junior Hockey League (MHL).

Vorobyov's third stint coaching Lokomotiv Yaroslavl was from 2011 to 2014, replacing Brad McCrimmon as head coach after McCrimmon and the entire team were killed in the 2011 Lokomotiv Yaroslavl plane crash.

Finally, Vorobiev coached SKA-1946 in 2015-16, and SKA-Neva in 2016-17, and the SKA Saint Petersburg junior team for 3 seasons from 2017 to 2020.
