= Clothestime =

Defunct American women's clothing retailer

Clothestime Stores Inc.
- Formerly: Clothesline (1974)
- Company type: Public (1983-1997), Private (after 1997)
- Industry: Retail
- Founded: 1974; 52 years ago
- Defunct: 2004; 22 years ago
- Headquarters: Anaheim, California
- Number of locations: 550 (December 1995)
- Key people: Raymond DeAngelo; John Ortega II; Norman Abramson
- Products: Apparel
- Website: "Clothestime". Archived from the original on 12 April 2003.

Clothestime was an American discount women's apparel retailer which originally found success in the junior clothing market. Founded by Raymond DeAngelo and John Ortega II in 1974, at its peak, the chain had more than 500 locations across the United States.

Their motto was "always in fashion, never full price", and they typically offered trendy brand-named merchandise at 30 to 70 percent below the retail prices suggested by manufacturers, as well as their own private-label items.

Clothestime stores were often located in low-rent strip malls.

== History ==
During the early 1970s, business partners Raymond DeAngelo and John Ortega II curated clothing items from flea markets, reselling them to retailers in Southern California. By 1974, they shifted to conventional retailing and opened their own store, which they soon developed into a retail chain.

In 1983, Clothestime went public, and rapid growth soon followed. They expanded from 98 stores at the time of going public, to 263 stores by 1987.

In 1989, amid a $2.2 million loss (~$4.83 million in 2024) from the previous year, Clothestime changed their marketing strategy, targeting "older" career-oriented customers over the age of 25.

By 1992, Clothestime was back to rapid growth, and the company set a goal of opening 1,000 stores by the year 2000. However, operations had already begun to show signs of slowing in 1993.

In January 1995, Raymond DeAngelo resigned from his position as chief executive officer, vice chairman, and director. Prior to his resignation, DeAngelo had been vice chairman since 1982, and chief executive since 1990.

In December 1995, Clothestime filed for bankruptcy for the first time, with plans to close 140 of its 550 stores.

In January 1997, executives John Ortega II (chairman, chief executive, and co-founder), and Norman Abramson (president and chief operating officer) resigned from their positions at Clothestime.

In September 1997, a bankruptcy court confirmed reorganization plans for Clothestime. Clothestime's stock was cancelled, and the company went private.

In 2002, Clothestime launched an $8 million marketing campaign.

In January 2003, in the hopes of retooling its image, Clothestime was purchased by JM Associates, an apparel manufacturer in New York.

In June 2003, Clothestime's creditors filed an involuntary bankruptcy petition, claiming more than $700,000 (~$1.14 million in 2024) in missed payments.

In early 2004, Clothestime ceased operations.

In 2012, the bankruptcy case was closed after Clothestime had paid out almost $2 million (~$2.69 million in 2024) in claims to creditors.

As of 2013, Clothestime owed the state of California almost $2.9 million (~$3.84 million in 2024) in unpaid taxes.
