= 2013–14 Lithuanian Hockey League season =

Lithuanian ice hockey league season

The 2013–14 Lithuanian Hockey League season was the 23rd season of the Lithuanian Hockey League, the top level of ice hockey in Lithuania. 14 teams participated in the league, and Kaliningrado Delovaja Rus won the championship.

== Regular season ==
=== Eastern Division ===
	Club	GP	W	OTW	OTL	L	Goals	Pts
1.	Elektrėnų Lokiai-Poseidonas	12	7	1	0	4	68:52	23
2.	Rokiškio Rokiškis	12	7	0	1	4	66:41	22
3.	Vilnius Hockey Punks	12	7	0	0	5	44:53	21
4.	Vilnius Ober-Haus	12	4	0	0	8	51:61	12
5.	Juodupės Juodupė	12	4	0	0	8	43:65	12

=== Central Division ===
	Club	GP	W	OTW	OTL	L	Goals	Pts
1.	Kauno Baltų-Ainiai	12	8	1	0	3	80:35	27
2.	Bizonai Kaunas II	12	7	1	1	3	67:46	24
3.	Kauno Sparnai-Staklės	12	7	0	0	5	69:57	21
4.	Suduva Marijampole	12	0	0	0	12	24:102	0

=== Western Division ===
	Club	GP	W	OTW	OTL	L	Goals	Pts
1.	Delovaja Rus Kaliningrado	9	8	0	0	1	71:19	24
2.	Šiaulių Ledo linija	9	6	0	0	3	36:34	18
3.	Bizonai Kaunas	9	3	0	0	6	42:52	9
4.	Baltija Klaipeda	9	1	0	0	8	23:67	3
5.	Kirai Klaipeda	2*	0	0	0	2	3:9	0

(*Withdrew from the league after two games.)

== Playoffs ==
=== Quarterfinals ===
- Kauno Baltų-Ainiai 11 - Kauno Sparnai-Staklės 5
- Kaliningrado Delovaja Rus 11 - Vilnius Hockey Punks 1
- Bizonai Kaunas II 2 - Šiaulių Ledo linija 5
- Elektrėnų Lokiai-Poseidonas 1 - Rokiškio Rokiškis 2

=== Semifinals ===
- Kaliningrado Delovaja Rus 7 - Šiaulių Ledo linija 0
- Kauno Baltų-Ainiai 0 - Rokiškio Rokiškis 4

=== 3rd place game ===
- Kauno Baltų-Ainiai 1 - Šiaulių Ledo linija 10

=== Final ===
- Kaliningrado Delovaja Rus 11 - Rokiškio Rokiškis 4
