= CIS men's national junior ice hockey team =

Commonwealth of Independent States team

Commonwealth of Independent States
- Head coach: Pyotr Vorobyov
- Most points: Alexei Kovalev (10)
- IIHF code: CIS

First international
- CIS 10–2 Switzerland (Kaufbeuren, Germany; December 26, 1991)

Biggest win
- CIS 10–2 Switzerland (Kaufbeuren, Germany; December 26, 1991)

Biggest defeat
- Czechoslovakia 5–2 CIS (Füssen, Germany; January 1, 1992)

IIHF World Junior Championship
- Appearances: 1 (first in 1992)
- Best result: Gold: 1 – (1992)

International record (W–L–T)
- 6–1–0

Medal record

World Junior Championships
Gold medal – first place	1992 Germany	

The CIS men's national under 20 ice hockey team was an under-20 ice hockey team that played for one year at the International Ice Hockey Federation's World Junior Ice Hockey Championships in 1992. They represented the Commonwealth of Independent States - former Soviet Union nations, while the dissolution was occurring. They won the gold medal at the tournament. They were coached by Pyotr Vorobyov.

The following year the team was replaced by the Russia men's national junior ice hockey team.
