= IIHF World Junior Championship =

Men's national under-20 ice hockey tournament

- Upcoming season or competition: 2027 World Junior Ice Hockey Championships
- Sport: Ice hockey
- First season: 1974 (unofficial); 1977 (official)
- No. of teams: 10
- Most recent champion: Sweden (2026, 3rd title)
- Most titles: Canada (20 titles)
- Relegation to: Division I Division II; Division III
- Website: IIHF.com

The IIHF World Junior Championship (WJC), commonly referred to as the World Juniors, is an annual event organized by the International Ice Hockey Federation (IIHF) for national under-20 ice hockey teams from around the world. It is traditionally held in late December, ending in early January (beginning from Boxing Day to January 5). The tournament usually attracts the top hockey players in this age category.

The main tournament features the top ten ranked hockey nations in the world, comprising the 'Top Division', from which a world champion is crowned. There are also three lower pools—Divisions I, II and III—that each play separate tournaments playing for the right to be promoted to a higher pool, or face relegation to a lower pool.

The competition holds a particularly high profile in Canada, partly for historical reasons. Before NHL players were permitted to compete in the Winter Olympics, this tournament was one of the few opportunities for top Western players to face the best athletes from the Soviet Bloc. The only other event of comparable stature that featured such matchups was the irregularly scheduled Canada Cup for senior national teams. The tournament's stature in Canada can also be credited to Canada's strong performance in the tournament (it has won the gold medal twenty times since its inception), the role of hockey in Canadian culture, along with strong media coverage and fan attendance. As such, in recent years, nearly half of the tournaments have been held in Canadian cities, with the remainder being held in Europe and the United States.

Sweden is the defending champion, having defeated Czechia to win the 2026 edition in Minnesota.

== History ==
The first official tournament was held in 1977, although the first three tournaments were held unofficially from 1974 to 1976. The tournament has been dominated by the teams from Canada and Soviet Union/CIS/Russia, together accounting for 33 of the 49 overall gold medals awarded (through 2025). The USSR won the first four official tournaments, while the Canadians put together five straight championships between 1993 and 1997, and another five straight from 2005 to 2009. Canada leads the all-time gold medal count with 20 golds, while the Soviet Union, the CIS, and Russia combined have 13 golds.

When it began, the World Junior Championship was a relatively obscure tournament. It has since grown in prestige, particularly in Canada, where the tournament ranks as one of the most important events on the sports calendar and during the holiday season. The Globe and Mail writer Bruce Dowbiggin credits TSN, along with Canada's strong performance at the tournament, for turning it from an obscure non-event when it acquired the rights in 1991 (which had started to grow in prominence due to the 1987 Punch-up in Piestany) to one of Canada's most beloved annual sports events, and at the same time cementing the link between Canadian nationalism and hockey, and inspiring the NHL's Winter Classic. Based on increasing attendances for countries repeatedly hosting the event, the popularity of the tournament seems to be growing in other nations as well.

At editions of the tournament held in the country, games involving Team Canada consistently sell out NHL arenas, offering large profit guarantees to Hockey Canada and the IIHF. In the 21st century, Canada has and will continue to host the tournament every second or third year due to the significantly greater following the tournament has in Canada compared to other participating countries. Originally, Switzerland was selected to host the WJHC in 2010, but withdrew. Buffalo, New York, in the United States, hosted the tournament in 2011 and 2018; in both cases, proximity to Canada's population core in Southern Ontario was a key factor to the city winning the bidding rights.

The tournament offers an international stage for young hockey players, which some credit as boosting a player's value for upcoming NHL entry drafts.

=== Punch-up in Piestany ===
One of the most infamous incidents in WJC history occurred in 1987 in Piestany, Czechoslovakia (now part of Slovakia), where a bench-clearing brawl occurred between Canada and the Soviet Union. It began when the Soviet Union's Pavel Kostichkin took a two-handed slash at Canadian player Theoren Fleury. The Soviet Union's Evgeny Davydov then came off the bench, eventually leading to both benches emptying. The officials, unable to break up the numerous fights, left the ice and eventually tried shutting off the arena lights, but the brawl lasted for 20 minutes before the IIHF declared the game null and void. A 35-minute emergency meeting was held, resulting in the delegates voting 7–1 (the sole dissenter was Canadian Dennis McDonald) to eject both teams from the tournament. The Canadian team chose to leave rather than stay for the end-of-tournament dinner, from which the Soviet team was banned.

While the Soviets were out of medal contention, Canada was playing for the gold medal and was leading 4–2 at the time of the brawl. The gold medal ultimately went to Finland, hosts Czechoslovakia took the silver and Sweden, who had previously been eliminated from medal contention, was awarded the bronze.

== Medalists ==
The winners by season listed below.

=== Unofficial tournaments ===
Year	(gold) Gold	(silver) Silver	(bronze) Bronze	4th place	Host city (cities)	Host country (countries)
1974	Soviet Union	Finland	Canada	Sweden	Leningrad	Soviet Union
1975	Soviet Union	Canada	Sweden	Czechoslovakia	Winnipeg and Brandon; Minneapolis, Bloomington and Fargo	Canada; United States
1976	Soviet Union	Canada	Czechoslovakia	Finland	Tampere, Turku, Pori and Rauma	Finland

=== Official tournaments ===
Key

- (#) Number of tournaments (or 2nd, 3rd or 4th places) won at the time.

Year	(gold) Gold	(silver) Silver	(bronze) Bronze	4th place	Host city (cities)	Host country (countries)
1977	Soviet Union (1)	Canada (1)	Czechoslovakia (1)	Finland (1)	Zvolen and Banská Bystrica	Czechoslovakia
1978	Soviet Union (2)	Sweden (1)	Canada (1)	Czechoslovakia (1)	Montreal, Quebec City, Chicoutimi, Hull and Cornwall	Canada
1979	Soviet Union (3)	Czechoslovakia (1)	Sweden (1)	Finland (2)	Karlstad and Karlskoga	Sweden
1980	Soviet Union (4)	Finland (1)	Sweden (2)	Czechoslovakia (2)	Helsinki and Vantaa	Finland
1981	Sweden (1)	Finland (2)	Soviet Union (1)	Czechoslovakia (3)	Füssen, Landsberg and Kaufbeuren	West Germany
1982	Canada (1)	Czechoslovakia (2)	Finland (1)	Soviet Union (1)	Bloomington, Minneapolis and Duluth; Winnipeg and Kenora	United States; Canada
1983	Soviet Union (5)	Czechoslovakia (3)	Canada (2)	Sweden (1)	Leningrad	Soviet Union
1984	Soviet Union (6)	Finland (3)	Czechoslovakia (2)	Canada (1)	Norrköping and Nyköping	Sweden
1985	Canada (2)	Czechoslovakia (4)	Soviet Union (2)	Finland (3)	Helsinki and Turku	Finland
1986	Soviet Union (7)	Canada (2)	United States (1)	Czechoslovakia (4)	Hamilton, Toronto and London	Canada
1987	Finland (Note: During the final game of the tournament, Canada and the Soviet Union became engaged in a violent bench-clearing brawl while Canada was leading 4–2. Consequently, the game was declared null and void, and both teams were ejected from the tournament; while the Soviets were out of medal contention, Canada was playing for the gold medal and were guaranteed at least a bronze.) (1)	Czechoslovakia (5)	Sweden (3)	United States (1)	Piešťany, Topoľčany, Trenčín and Nitra	Czechoslovakia
1988	Canada (3)	Soviet Union (1)	Finland (2)	Czechoslovakia (5)	Moscow	Soviet Union
1989	Soviet Union (8)	Sweden (2)	Czechoslovakia (3)	Canada (2)	Anchorage and Eagle River	United States
1990	Canada (4)	Soviet Union (2)	Czechoslovakia (4)	Finland (4)	Helsinki and Turku	Finland
1991	Canada (5)	Soviet Union (3)	Czechoslovakia (5)	United States (2)	Saskatoon	Canada
1992	CIS (1)	Sweden (3)	United States (2)	Finland (5)	Füssen and Kaufbeuren	Germany
1993	Canada (6)	Sweden (4)	Czech Republic and Slovakia (6)	United States (3)	Gävle, Uppsala and Falun	Sweden
1994	Canada (7)	Sweden (5)	Russia (1)	Finland (6)	Ostrava and Frýdek-Místek	Czech Republic
1995	Canada (8)	Russia (1)	Sweden (4)	Finland (7)	Red Deer, Edmonton and Calgary	Canada
1996	Canada (9)	Sweden (6)	Russia (2)	Czech Republic (1)	Boston, Amherst and Marlborough	United States
1997	Canada (10)	United States (1)	Russia (3)	Czech Republic (2)	Geneva and Morges	Switzerland
1998	Finland (2)	Russia (2)	Switzerland (1)	Czech Republic (3)	Helsinki and Hämeenlinna	Finland
1999	Russia (1)	Canada (3)	Slovakia (1)	Sweden (2)	Winnipeg, Brandon and Selkirk	Canada
2000	Czech Republic (1)	Russia (3)	Canada (3)	United States (4)	Skellefteå and Umeå	Sweden
2001	Czech Republic (2)	Finland (4)	Canada (4)	Sweden (3)	Moscow and Podolsk	Russia
2002	Russia (2)	Canada (4)	Finland (3)	Switzerland (1)	Pardubice and Hradec Králové	Czech Republic
2003	Russia (3)	Canada (5)	Finland (4)	United States (5)	Halifax and Sydney	Canada
2004	United States (1)	Canada (6)	Finland (5)	Czech Republic (4)	Helsinki and Hämeenlinna	Finland
2005	Canada (11)	Russia (4)	Czech Republic (1)	United States (6)	Grand Forks and Thief River Falls	United States
2006	Canada (12)	Russia (5)	Finland (6)	United States (7)	Vancouver, Kelowna and Kamloops	Canada
2007	Canada (13)	Russia (6)	United States (3)	Sweden (4)	Leksand and Mora	Sweden
2008	Canada (14)	Sweden (7)	Russia (4)	United States (8)	Pardubice and Liberec	Czech Republic
2009	Canada (15)	Sweden (8)	Russia (5)	Slovakia (1)	Ottawa	Canada
2010	United States (2)	Canada (7)	Sweden (5)	Switzerland (2)	Saskatoon and Regina	Canada
2011	Russia (4)	Canada (8)	United States (4)	Sweden (5)	Buffalo and Lewiston	United States
2012	Sweden (2)	Russia (7)	Canada (5)	Finland (8)	Calgary and Edmonton	Canada
2013	United States (3)	Sweden (9)	Russia (6)	Canada (3)	Ufa	Russia
2014	Finland (3)	Sweden (10)	Russia (7)	Canada (4)	Malmö	Sweden
2015	Canada (16)	Russia (8)	Slovakia (2)	Sweden (6)	Toronto and Montreal	Canada
2016	Finland (4)	Russia (9)	United States (5)	Sweden (7)	Helsinki	Finland
2017	United States (4)	Canada (9)	Russia (8)	Sweden (8)	Montreal and Toronto	Canada
2018	Canada (17)	Sweden (11)	United States (6)	Czech Republic (5)	Buffalo and Orchard Park	United States
2019	Finland (5)	United States (2)	Russia (9)	Switzerland (3)	Vancouver and Victoria	Canada
2020	Canada (18)	Russia (10)	Sweden (6)	Finland (9)	Ostrava and Třinec	Czech Republic
2021	United States (5)	Canada (10)	Finland (7)	Russia (1)	Edmonton	Canada
2022	Canada (19)	Finland (5)	Sweden (7)	Czechia (6)	Edmonton	Canada
2023	Canada (20)	Czechia (1)	United States (7)	Sweden (9)	Halifax and Moncton	Canada
2024	United States (6)	Sweden (12)	Czechia (2)	Finland (10)	Gothenburg	Sweden
2025	United States (7)	Finland (6)	Czechia (3)	Sweden (10)	Ottawa	Canada
2026	Sweden (3)	Czechia (2)	Canada (6)	Finland (11)	Minneapolis and Saint Paul	United States
2027					Edmonton and Red Deer	Canada
2028					Tampere and Turku	Finland
2029					Quebec City and Trois-Rivières	Canada

In 2024, the IIHF announced that Canada will host the tournament every odd year until their agreement with Hockey Canada runs out in 2034.

== Medal table ==
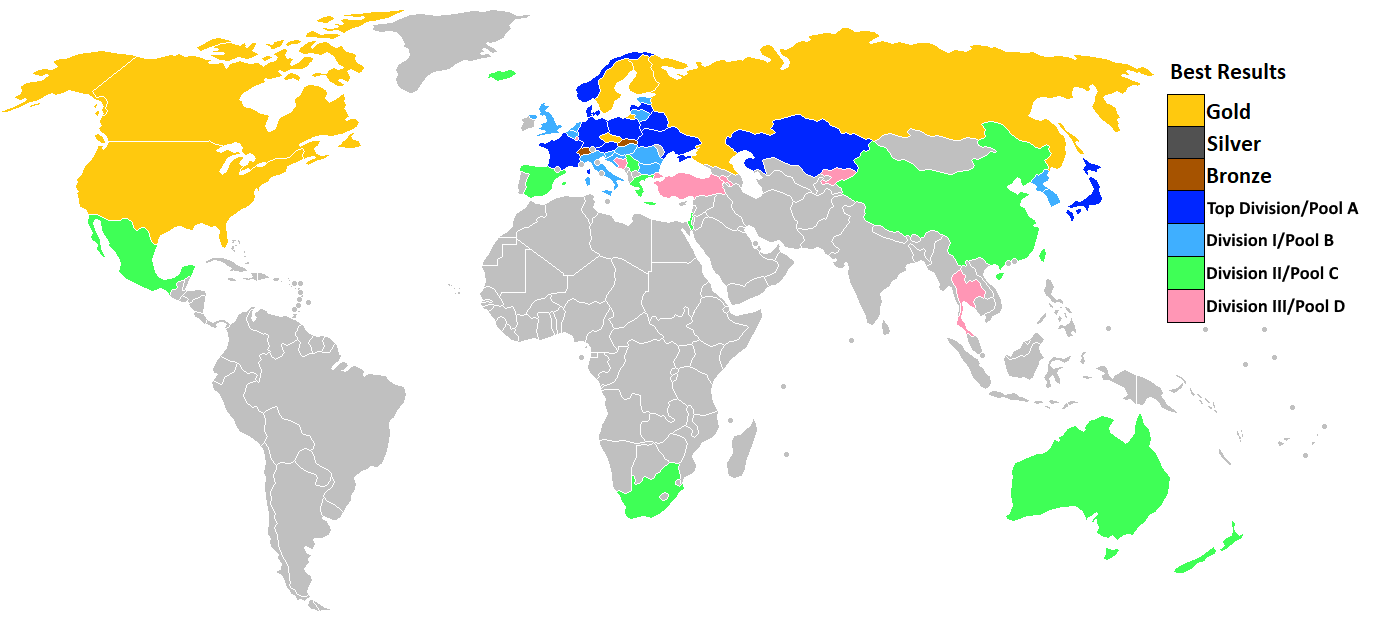
Map of countries' best results

The unofficial tournaments held prior to 1977 are not included in this table.

Countries in italics no longer compete at the World Championships.

Country	(gold) Gold	(silver) Silver	(bronze) Bronze	Medals
Canada	20	10	6	36
Russia; Soviet Union; CIS; Total	4; 8; 1; 13	10; 3; 0; 13	9; 2; 0; 11	23; 13; 1; 37
United States	7	2	7	16
Finland	5	6	7	18
Sweden	3	12	7	22
Czechia; Czechoslovakia; Total	2; 0; 2	2; 5; 7	3; 6; 9	7; 11; 18
Slovakia	0	0	2	2
Switzerland	0	0	1	1
Total	50	50	50	150

== Hosting countries ==
The 1974 (Soviet Union), 1975 (Canada & USA), and 1976 (Finland) unofficial tournaments are included in this table.

As of 2026 tournament

Host country	Tournaments
Canada	18 (Note: 1975 and 1982 tournaments were co-hosted with the United States)
United States	8 (Note: 1975 and 1982 tournaments were co-hosted with Canada)
Finland	7
Sweden	7
Czechia; Czechoslovakia; Total	4; 2 (Note: 1977 and 1987 tournaments played in what is now Slovakia); 6
Russia; Soviet Union; CIS; Total	2; 3; 0; 5
Germany; West Germany; Total	1; 1; 2
Switzerland	1

== Participating countries ==
Canada, Finland, Sweden, and Czechoslovakia/Czechia have participated in all 50 IIHF Ice Hockey World Junior Championships as well as the three unofficial tournaments. The United States has participated in all except the unofficial tournament in 1976. The USSR/CIS/Russia participated in all tournaments until the 2022 edition (having been suspended by the IIHF in February 2022 as a result of the Russian invasion of Ukraine).

When Czechoslovakia peacefully split in 1993, Czechia remained in Pool A but Slovakia was placed in Pool C (now Division II). Slovakia was promoted to the top division for the 1996 Championships and has remained there since.

When the Soviet Union broke up, Russia remained in Pool A, while all other former Soviet republics started competing in Pool C in 1993.

Starting with the 1996 tournament, the competition was increased from an 8-team round-robin to the current 10-team format, including elimination rounds. Since then, Switzerland has become a regular participant.

Germany has been a frequent participant in the top pool, having played there roughly half the time in the past decade. Belarus, Denmark, Kazakhstan, Latvia, and Norway have also each made a number of top division appearances since the early 1990s. Less frequent top pool appearances have been made by Austria, France, Japan, Poland and Ukraine.

At the most recent championship, held in the United States in 2026, participating teams were Canada, Czechia, Denmark, Finland, Germany, Latvia, Slovakia, Sweden, Switzerland, and the United States.

Team	Appearances	Most recent year in Top Division
Canada	53	2026
Czechia / Czechoslovakia	53	2026
Finland	53	2026
Sweden	53	2026
United States	52	2026
Russia / Soviet Union / CIS	48	2021
Switzerland	39	2026
Germany / West Germany	32	2026
Slovakia	31	2026
Latvia	10	2026
Kazakhstan	9	2025
Norway	9	2024
Denmark	8	2026
Belarus	8	2018
Austria	6	2023
Poland	6	1997
Ukraine	4	2004
France	1	2002
Japan	1	1993

As of 2026 tournament

== Player eligibility ==
A player is eligible to play in the World Junior Ice Hockey Championships if:

- the player is eligible to compete as a male athlete
- the player has to be no younger than fifteen (15) years old and no older than twenty (20) years old in the year that the tournament ends (e.g. born between 2006 and 2011 for the 2026 tournament)
- the player is a citizen in the country he represents;
- the player is under the jurisdiction of a national association that is a member of the IIHF.

If a player who has never played in IIHF-organized competition wishes to switch national eligibility, he must have played in competitions for two consecutive years in the new country without playing in another country, as well as show his move to the new country's national association with an international transfer card. In case the player has previously played in IIHF-organized competition but wishes to switch national eligibility, he must have played in competitions for four consecutive years in the new country without playing in another country, he must show his move to the new country's national association with an international transfer card, as well as be a citizen of the new country. A player may only switch national eligibility once.

== Tournament awards ==
At the conclusion of each tournament, the Directorate of the IIHF presents awards to the Top Goalie, Forward, and Defenceman of the tournament. The media attending the event select an All-Star team separately from this.

== Broadcast coverage ==
The following television networks and websites broadcast World Junior Championship games on television or online.

Country	Broadcaster(s)
Canada	The Sports Network; Réseau des sports
Czechia	ČT Sport
Europe	Eurosport
Finland	TV5
Latvia	TV6
Slovakia	JOJ Šport
Sweden	Sveriges Television; Viaplay Group
Switzerland	UPC Switzerland (MySports)
United States	NHL Network; ESPN+

The Sports Network (TSN) produced by Paul Graham has covered the World Junior Championship annually since 1992, after reaching a broadcast agreement with then Hockey Canada vice-president Bob Nicholson. TSN initially covered only the Team Canada games, then added all games in Team Canada's pool. TSN gradually expanded coverage to include all games of the tournament, when Graham insisted on "a big game feel". As of the 2021 Championships, all pre-tournament and in-tournament games were broadcast. As of the 2025 Championships, coverage exceeded 84 broadcast hours.

TSN is the IIHF's main broadcast partner for this tournament. TSN.ca carries all games excluding relegation games live, as well as most games on demand after their completion. Beginning with 2022 WJC, the international feed produced by TSN as seen on NHL Network's USA Hockey team games and in other countries has the IIHF lettering for game scores instead of TSN's.

Starting with the 2013 tournament, a paywall and geo-block was implemented on TSN's online coverage. The same system applies to Canadian cable subscribers and subscribers of TSN's streaming service – users cannot stream the tournament outside of Canada on TSN Direct.

Norway is currently a 'blackout' zone. Neither Eurosport or Viasat carry the tournament.

== See also ==
- Ice Hockey World Championships
- IIHF World U18 Championship
- IIHF World Ranking
- World Junior A Challenge
- World U-17 Hockey Challenge
- 2007 Super Series
