= 2001–02 Ottawa Senators season =

NHL hockey team season

2001–02 Ottawa Senators
- Division: 3rd Northeast
- Conference: 7th Eastern
- 2001–02 record: 39–27–9–7
- Home record: 21–13–3–4
- Road record: 18–14–6–3
- Goals for: 243
- Goals against: 208

Team information
- General manager: Marshall Johnston
- Coach: Jacques Martin; Roger Neilson (interim)
- Captain: Daniel Alfredsson
- Alternate captains: Curtis Leschyshyn; Wade Redden
- Arena: Corel Centre
- Average attendance: 16,919
- Minor league affiliates: Grand Rapids Griffins; Mobile Mysticks

Team leaders
- Goals: Daniel Alfredsson (37)
- Assists: Radek Bonk (45)
- Points: Daniel Alfredsson (71)
- Penalty minutes: Chris Neil (231)
- Plus/minus: Zdeno Chara (+30)
- Wins: Patrick Lalime (27)
- Goals against average: Patrick Lalime (2.48)

The 2001–02 Ottawa Senators season was the 10th season of the Ottawa Senators of the National Hockey League (NHL). This season saw the Senators place third in the Northeast Division, with 94 points. In the playoffs, they upset the Philadelphia Flyers in five games, limiting the Flyers' high-powered offence to just two goals for the franchise's second playoff series win. This led to a second round series with the Toronto Maple Leafs, in which the Sens lost in a tense seven-game affair.

== Off-season ==
Prior to the season, former captain Alexei Yashin was traded to the New York Islanders for Zdeno Chara, Bill Muckalt and the Islanders' first-round draft pick (second overall), which the Sens used to draft Jason Spezza. Chara and Muckalt would play for the Senators, while Spezza returned to junior.

== Regular season ==
On November 13, 2001, the Senators defeated the Washington Capitals on the road by a score of 11–5. Captain Daniel Alfredsson scored a hat-trick in the game. It was the first time that an NHL team had scored ten goals in a regular-season game since February 3, 1999, when the Washington Capitals defeated the Tampa Bay Lightning at home by a score of 10–1. It was also the first time in modern franchise history that the Senators had scored ten goals in a regular-season game.

=== Final standings ===
Northeast Division
No.	CR		GP	W	L	T	OTL	GF	GA	Pts
1	1	**Boston Bruins**	82	43	24	6	9	236	201	101
2	4	**Toronto Maple Leafs**	82	43	25	10	4	249	207	100
3	7	**Ottawa Senators**	82	39	27	9	7	243	208	94
4	8	**Montreal Canadiens**	82	36	31	12	3	207	209	87
5	10	Buffalo Sabres	82	35	35	11	1	213	200	82

Note: CR = Conference rank; GP = Games played; W = Wins; L = Losses; T = Ties; OTL = Overtime loss; GF = Goals for; GA = Goals against; Pts = Points
Bolded teams qualified for the playoffs.

Eastern Conference
R		Div	GP	W	L	T	OTL	GF	GA	Pts
**1**	**Z-** Boston Bruins	**NE**	**82**	**43**	**24**	**6**	**9**	**236**	**201**	101
**2**	**Y-** Philadelphia Flyers	**AT**	**82**	**42**	**27**	**10**	**3**	**234**	**192**	97
**3**	**Y-** Carolina Hurricanes	**SE**	**82**	**35**	**26**	**16**	**5**	**217**	**217**	91
**4**	**X-** Toronto Maple Leafs	**NE**	**82**	**43**	**25**	**10**	**4**	**249**	**207**	100
**5**	**X-** New York Islanders	**AT**	**82**	**42**	**28**	**8**	**4**	**239**	**220**	96
**6**	**X-** New Jersey Devils	**AT**	**82**	**41**	**28**	**9**	**4**	**205**	**187**	95
**7**	**X-** Ottawa Senators	**NE**	**82**	**39**	**27**	**9**	**7**	**243**	**208**	94
**8**	**X-** Montreal Canadiens	**NE**	**82**	**36**	**31**	**12**	**3**	**207**	**209**	87
8.5
9	Washington Capitals	SE	82	36	33	11	2	228	240	85
10	Buffalo Sabres	NE	82	35	35	11	1	213	200	82
11	New York Rangers	AT	82	36	38	4	4	227	258	80
12	Pittsburgh Penguins	AT	82	28	41	8	5	198	249	69
13	Tampa Bay Lightning	SE	82	27	40	11	4	178	219	69
14	Florida Panthers	SE	82	22	44	10	6	180	250	60
15	Atlanta Thrashers	SE	82	19	47	11	5	187	288	54

Divisions: AT – Atlantic, NE – Northeast, SE – Southeast

Z – Clinched conference; Y – Clinched division; X – Clinched playoff spot

== Playoffs ==
In the first round, Ottawa was matched against the Philadelphia Flyers, who were favoured. After the Flyers won the first game, the Senators won the next four. Patrick Lalime would record three consecutive shutouts in games two through four. The Senators won the series by winning the fifth game in overtime, in Philadelphia.

The Senators would go against the Toronto Maple Leafs for the third consecutive season in the playoffs. The teams would take turns winning games and the series would go seven games, with the deciding game won in Toronto by the Maple Leafs.

== Schedule and results ==
=== Regular season ===
2001–02 regular season
October: 6–6–1–0 (home: 1–3–1–0; road: 5–3–0–0)

Game	Date	Score	Opponent	Record	Attendance	Recap
1	October 3, 2001	5–4	@ Toronto Maple Leafs (2001–02)	1–0–0–0	19,173	W
2	October 4, 2001	4–6	Montreal Canadiens (2001–02)	1–1–0–0	18,500	L
3	October 6, 2001	2–3	@ Buffalo Sabres (2001–02)	1–2–0–0	16,590	L
4	October 9, 2001	6–2	@ Carolina Hurricanes (2001–02)	2–2–0–0	10,052	W
5	October 10, 2001	2–0	@ Florida Panthers (2001–02)	3–2–0–0	14,651	W
6	October 13, 2001	2–2 OT	New York Rangers (2001–02)	3–2–1–0	17,103	T
7	October 16, 2001	2–5	@ Pittsburgh Penguins (2001–02)	3–3–1–0	14,907	L
8	October 18, 2001	0–3	Pittsburgh Penguins (2001–02)	3–4–1–0	15,521	L
9	October 20, 2001	2–3	@ New Jersey Devils (2001–02)	3–5–1–0	15,124	L
10	October 23, 2001	1–2	New Jersey Devils (2001–02)	3–6–1–0	15,107	L
11	October 25, 2001	7–2	@ Philadelphia Flyers (2001–02)	4–6–1–0	19,534	W
12	October 27, 2001	4–1	St. Louis Blues (2001–02)	5–6–1–0	16,119	W
13	October 30, 2001	6–3	@ Atlanta Thrashers (2001–02)	6–6–1–0	11,548	W

November: 6–2–2–0 (home: 5–1–2–0; road: 1–1–0–0)

Game	Date	Score	Opponent	Record	Attendance	Recap
14	November 3, 2001	3–0	Buffalo Sabres (2001–02)	7–6–1–0	15,942	W
15	November 8, 2001	1–0	Colorado Avalanche (2001–02)	8–6–1–0	17,752	W
16	November 10, 2001	3–2	Nashville Predators (2001–02)	9–6–1–0	16,895	W
17	November 13, 2001	11–5	@ Washington Capitals (2001–02)	10–6–1–0	15,023	W
18	November 15, 2001	1–1 OT	Carolina Hurricanes (2001–02)	10–6–2–0	14,117	T
19	November 17, 2001	2–1 OT	Toronto Maple Leafs (2001–02)	11–6–2–0	18,500	W
20	November 20, 2001	3–0	Vancouver Canucks (2001–02)	12–6–2–0	15,547	W
21	November 22, 2001	4–4 OT	Calgary Flames (2001–02)	12–6–3–0	16,839	T
22	November 24, 2001	3–6	Atlanta Thrashers (2001–02)	12–7–3–0	15,839	L
23	November 27, 2001	2–4	@ St. Louis Blues (2001–02)	12–8–3–0	19,786	L

December: 8–6–1–1 (home: 4–2–0–1; road: 4–4–1–0)

Game	Date	Score	Opponent	Record	Attendance	Recap
24	December 1, 2001	2–1 OT	Boston Bruins (2001–02)	13–8–3–0	16,480	W
25	December 3, 2001	2–4	@ Colorado Avalanche (2001–02)	13–9–3–0	18,007	L
26	December 5, 2001	6–3	@ Dallas Stars (2001–02)	14–9–3–0	18,532	W
27	December 6, 2001	2–4	@ Nashville Predators (2001–02)	14–10–3–0	12,522	L
28	December 8, 2001	5–2	Tampa Bay Lightning (2001–02)	15–10–3–0	15,277	W
29	December 11, 2001	2–2 OT	@ New York Islanders (2001–02)	15–10–4–0	12,235	T
30	December 13, 2001	6–0	Phoenix Coyotes (2001–02)	16–10–4–0	17,585	W
31	December 15, 2001	0–2	New Jersey Devils (2001–02)	16–11–4–0	17,142	L
32	December 18, 2001	5–1	@ Carolina Hurricanes (2001–02)	17–11–4–0	11,166	W
33	December 20, 2001	2–4	Los Angeles Kings (2001–02)	17–12–4–0	16,207	L
34	December 22, 2001	1–0	@ New Jersey Devils (2001–02)	18–12–4–0	15,089	W
35	December 23, 2001	2–3	@ New York Rangers (2001–02)	18–13–4–0	18,200	L
36	December 26, 2001	2–3	@ Boston Bruins (2001–02)	18–14–4–0	17,565	L
37	December 27, 2001	5–2	New York Islanders (2001–02)	19–14–4–0	18,500	W
38	December 29, 2001	5–2	@ Pittsburgh Penguins (2001–02)	20–14–4–0	17,148	W
39	December 31, 2001	4–5 OT	Chicago Blackhawks (2001–02)	20–14–4–1	17,622	OTL

January: 7–3–2–2 (home: 5–1–0–0; road: 2–2–2–2)

Game	Date	Score	Opponent	Record	Attendance	Recap
40	January 3, 2002	4–1	Washington Capitals (2001–02)	21–14–4–1	18,296	W
41	January 5, 2002	1–3	@ Toronto Maple Leafs (2001–02)	21–15–4–1	19,235	L
42	January 7, 2002	4–3	Toronto Maple Leafs (2001–02)	22–15–4–1	18,500	W
43	January 9, 2002	3–4 OT	@ Atlanta Thrashers (2001–02)	22–15–4–2	10,721	OTL
44	January 11, 2002	4–2	@ Florida Panthers (2001–02)	23–15–4–2	14,105	W
45	January 12, 2002	2–1	@ Tampa Bay Lightning (2001–02)	24–15–4–2	13,712	W
46	January 15, 2002	1–4	Philadelphia Flyers (2001–02)	24–16–4–2	16,246	L
47	January 17, 2002	2–5	@ Boston Bruins (2001–02)	24–17–4–2	15,989	L
48	January 19, 2002	4–1	Minnesota Wild (2001–02)	25–17–4–2	17,398	W
49	January 20, 2002	2–3 OT	@ Detroit Red Wings (2001–02)	25–17–4–3	20,058	OTL
50	January 22, 2002	1–1 OT	@ Philadelphia Flyers (2001–02)	25–17–5–3	19,469	T
51	January 24, 2002	4–3	Boston Bruins (2001–02)	26–17–5–3	17,093	W
52	January 26, 2002	1–1 OT	@ Montreal Canadiens (2001–02)	26–17–6–3	21,273	T
53	January 30, 2002	3–1	Philadelphia Flyers (2001–02)	27–17–6–3	15,761	W

February: 4–1–1–1 (home: 1–1–0–0; road: 3–0–1–1)

Game	Date	Score	Opponent	Record	Attendance	Recap
54	February 4, 2002	4–4 OT	@ Tampa Bay Lightning (2001–02)	27–17–7–3	12,358	T
55	February 6, 2002	6–4	@ Columbus Blue Jackets (2001–02)	28–17–7–3	18,136	W
56	February 8, 2002	2–3 OT	@ Buffalo Sabres (2001–02)	28–17–7–4	18,104	OTL
57	February 9, 2002	2–3	Detroit Red Wings (2001–02)	28–18–7–4	18,500	L
58	February 12, 2002	5–1	Pittsburgh Penguins (2001–02)	29–18–7–4	17,332	W
59	February 26, 2002	5–2	@ Montreal Canadiens (2001–02)	30–18–7–4	20,254	W
60	February 28, 2002	3–0	@ New York Rangers (2001–02)	31–18–7–4	18,200	W

March: 6–6–1–3 (home: 3–3–0–3; road: 3–3–1–0)

Game	Date	Score	Opponent	Record	Attendance	Recap
61	March 2, 2002	2–3 OT	Washington Capitals (2001–02)	31–18–7–5	17,814	OTL
62	March 4, 2002	1–1 OT	@ Los Angeles Kings (2001–02)	31–18–8–5	15,815	T
63	March 7, 2002	2–5	@ San Jose Sharks (2001–02)	31–19–8–5	17,496	L
64	March 9, 2002	2–3	@ Phoenix Coyotes (2001–02)	31–20–8–5	15,381	L
65	March 10, 2002	4–2	@ Mighty Ducks of Anaheim (2001–02)	32–20–8–5	12,358	W
66	March 12, 2002	4–3 OT	@ Minnesota Wild (2001–02)	33–20–8–5	18,064	W
67	March 14, 2002	1–4	Edmonton Oilers (2001–02)	33–21–8–5	18,397	L
68	March 16, 2002	4–3	New York Islanders (2001–02)	34–21–8–5	18,137	W
69	March 17, 2002	2–0	Florida Panthers (2001–02)	35–21–8–5	16,405	W
70	March 19, 2002	1–5	@ Buffalo Sabres (2001–02)	35–22–8–5	13,381	L
71	March 21, 2002	2–5	New York Rangers (2001–02)	35–23–8–5	16,245	L
72	March 23, 2002	2–3 OT	Atlanta Thrashers (2001–02)	35–23–8–6	16,061	OTL
73	March 24, 2002	2–3 OT	Buffalo Sabres (2001–02)	35–23–8–7	17,098	OTL
74	March 27, 2002	4–1	@ New York Islanders (2001–02)	36–23–8–7	13,384	W
75	March 28, 2002	3–4	Florida Panthers (2001–02)	36–24–8–7	14,352	L
76	March 30, 2002	3–1	Tampa Bay Lightning (2001–02)	37–24–8–7	17,859	W

April: 2–3–1–0 (home: 2–2–0–0; road: 0–1–1–0)

Game	Date	Score	Opponent	Record	Attendance	Recap
77	April 2, 2002	4–3	Carolina Hurricanes (2001–02)	38–24–8–7	16,371	W
78	April 5, 2002	0–0 OT	@ Washington Capitals (2001–02)	38–24–9–7	18,672	T
79	April 7, 2002	1–3	Montreal Canadiens (2001–02)	38–25–9–7	17,994	L
80	April 9, 2002	3–4	@ Montreal Canadiens (2001–02)	38–26–9–7	21,273	L
81	April 11, 2002	4–0	Boston Bruins (2001–02)	39–26–9–7	16,731	W
82	April 13, 2002	2–5	Toronto Maple Leafs (2001–02)	39–27–9–7	18,500	L

Legend: W Win (2 points) L Loss (0 points) T Tie (1 point) OTL Overtime loss (1 point)

=== Playoffs ===
2002 Stanley Cup playoffs
Eastern Conference Quarterfinals vs. (2) Philadelphia Flyers – Senators win 4–1

Game	Date	Score	Opponent	Series	Attendance	Recap
1	April 17, 2002	0–1 OT	@ Philadelphia Flyers	Flyers lead 1–0	19,420	L
2	April 20, 2002	3–0	@ Philadelphia Flyers	Series tied 1–1	19,734	W
3	April 22, 2002	3–0	Philadelphia Flyers	Senators lead 2–1	18,239	W
4	April 24, 2002	3–0	Philadelphia Flyers	Senators lead 3–1	18,500	W
5	April 26, 2002	2–1 OT	@ Philadelphia Flyers	Senators win 4–1	19,639	W

Eastern Conference Semifinals vs. (4) Toronto Maple Leafs – Maple Leafs win 4–3

Game	Date	Score	Opponent	Series	Attendance	Recap
1	May 2, 2002	5–0	@ Toronto Maple Leafs	Senators lead 1–0	19,406	W
2	May 4, 2002	2–3 3OT	@ Toronto Maple Leafs	Series tied 1–1	19,454	L
3	May 6, 2002	3–2	Toronto Maple Leafs	Senators lead 2–1	18,500	W
4	May 8, 2002	1–2	Toronto Maple Leafs	Series tied 2–2	18,500	L
5	May 10, 2002	4–2	@ Toronto Maple Leafs	Senators lead 3–2	19,499	W
6	May 12, 2002	3–4	Toronto Maple Leafs	Series tied 3–3	18,500	L
7	May 14, 2002	0–3	@ Toronto Maple Leafs	Maple Leafs win 4–3	19,551	L

Legend: W Win L Loss

== Player statistics ==
=== Scoring ===
- Position abbreviations: C = Centre; D = Defence; G = Goaltender; LW = Left wing; RW = Right wing
- † = Joined team via a transaction (e.g., trade, waivers, signing) during the season. Stats reflect time with the Senators only.
- ‡ = Left team via a transaction (e.g., trade, waivers, release) during the season. Stats reflect time with the Senators only.

No.	Player	Pos	Regular season						Playoffs					
No.	Player	Pos	GP	G	A	Pts	+/-	PIM	GP	G	A	Pts	+/-	PIM
11	Daniel Alfredsson	RW	78	37	34	71	3	45	12	7	6	13	6	4
14	Radek Bonk	C	82	25	45	70	3	52	12	3	7	10	−3	6
18	Marian Hossa	RW	80	31	35	66	11	50	12	4	6	10	2	2
9	Martin Havlat	RW	72	22	28	50	−7	66	12	2	5	7	0	14
28	Todd White	C	81	20	30	50	12	24	12	2	2	4	4	6
15	Shawn McEachern	LW	80	15	31	46	9	52	12	0	4	4	3	2
20	Magnus Arvedson	LW	74	12	27	39	27	35	12	2	1	3	−2	4
6	Wade Redden	D	79	9	25	34	22	48	12	3	2	5	4	6
12	Mike Fisher	C	58	15	9	24	8	55	10	2	1	3	4	0
3	Zdeno Chara	D	75	10	13	23	30	156	10	0	1	1	4	12
4	Chris Phillips	D	63	6	16	22	5	29	12	0	0	0	3	12
5	Sami Salo	D	66	4	14	18	1	14	12	2	1	3	4	4
23	Karel Rachunek	D	51	3	15	18	7	24	—	—	—	—	—	—
25	Chris Neil	RW	72	10	7	17	5	231	12	0	0	0	−1	12
26	Andre Roy‡	RW	56	6	8	14	3	148	—	—	—	—	—	—
33	Chris Herperger	C	72	4	9	13	4	43	—	—	—	—	—	—
7	Curtis Leschyshyn	D	79	1	9	10	−5	44	12	0	1	1	2	0
27	Ricard Persson	D	34	2	7	9	3	42	2	0	0	0	0	15
26	Benoit Brunet†	LW	13	5	3	8	−4	0	12	0	3	3	8	0
17	Bill Muckalt	RW	70	0	8	8	−3	46	—	—	—	—	—	—
16	Jody Hull†	RW	24	2	2	4	0	6	12	1	1	2	2	2
24	Ivan Ciernik‡	RW	23	1	2	3	0	4	—	—	—	—	—	—
34	Shane Hnidy	D	33	1	1	2	−10	57	12	1	1	2	−1	12
36 (Note: Ylonen wore number 24 in his first game.)	Juha Ylonen†	C	15	1	1	2	−1	2	12	0	5	5	2	2
21 (Note: Martins wore number 16 in his first ten games.)	Steve Martins	C	14	1	0	1	1	4	2	0	0	0	0	0
52	Chris Bala	LW	6	0	1	1	1	0	—	—	—	—	—	—
10	Toni Dahlman	RW	10	0	1	1	−1	0	—	—	—	—	—	—
40	Patrick Lalime	G	61	0	1	1		19	12	0	0	0		0
13	Petr Schastlivy	LW	1	0	1	1	1	0	—	—	—	—	—	—
35	Jani Hurme	G	25	0	0	0		17	—	—	—	—	—	—
29	Joel Kwiatkowski	D	11	0	0	0	5	12	—	—	—	—	—	—
1	Simon Lajeunesse	G	1	0	0	0		0	—	—	—	—	—	—
39	Josh Langfeld	RW	1	0	0	0	0	2	—	—	—	—	—	—
31	Martin Prusek	G	1	0	0	0		0	—	—	—	—	—	—
22	Jamie Rivers‡	D	2	0	0	0	−3	4	—	—	—	—	—	—

=== Goaltending ===
No.	Player	Regular season										Playoffs								
No.	Player	GP	W	L	T	SA	GA	GAA	SV%	SO	TOI	GP	W	L	SA	GA	GAA	SV%	SO	TOI
40	Patrick Lalime	61	27	24	8	1521	148	2.48	.903	7	3583	12	7	5	332	18	1.39	.946	4	778
35	Jani Hurme	25	12	9	1	578	54	2.48	.907	3	1309	—	—	—	—	—	—	—	—	—
1	Simon Lajeunesse	1	0	0	0	9	0	0.00	1.000	0	24	—	—	—	—	—	—	—	—	—
31	Martin Prusek	1	0	1	0	15	3	2.90	.800	0	62	—	—	—	—	—	—	—	—	—

== Awards and records ==
=== Awards ===
Type	Award/honour	Recipient	Ref
League (in-season)	NHL All-Star Game selection	Wade Redden	
League (in-season)	NHL YoungStars Game selection	Mike Fisher	
League (in-season)	NHL YoungStars Game selection	Martin Havlat (Note: Havlat did not play and was replaced by Fisher.)	
League (in-season)	NHL YoungStars Game selection	Karel Rachunek	
Team	Molson Cup	Daniel Alfredsson	

=== Milestones ===
Milestone	Player	Date	Ref
First game	Chris Neil	October 3, 2001	
First game	Toni Dahlman	January 3, 2002	
First game	Simon Lajeunesse	March 7, 2002	
First game	Martin Prusek	March 23, 2002	
First game	Chris Bala	March 27, 2002	
First game	Josh Langfeld	March 30, 2002	

== Transactions ==
The Senators were involved in the following transactions from June 10, 2001, the day after the deciding game of the 2001 Stanley Cup Final, through June 13, 2002, the day of the deciding game of the 2002 Stanley Cup Final.

=== Trades ===
Date	Details		Ref
June 23, 2001	To New York Islanders: Alexei Yashin	To Ottawa Senators: Zdeno Chara; Bill Muckalt; 1st-round pick in 2001	
June 23, 2001	To Philadelphia Flyers: 1st-round pick in 2001; 7th-round pick in 2001; Tampa Bay’s 2nd-round pick in 2002	To Ottawa Senators: 1st-round pick in 2001	
June 23, 2001	To New Jersey Devils: 2nd-round pick in 2001	To Ottawa Senators: 3rd-round pick in 2001; 3rd-round pick in 2001	
June 23, 2001	To Tampa Bay Lightning: New Jersey’s 3rd-round pick in 2001	To Ottawa Senators: 4th-round pick in 2001; 7th-round pick in 2001	
June 24, 2001	To Montreal Canadiens: Andreas Dackell	To Ottawa Senators: 8th-round pick in 2001	
June 29, 2001	To New York Rangers: Sean Gagnon	To Ottawa Senators: Jason Doig; Jeff Ulmer	
March 15, 2002	To Tampa Bay Lightning: Andre Roy; 6th-round pick 2002	To Ottawa Senators: Juha Ylonen	
March 16, 2002	To Dallas Stars: Conditional draft pick in 2003 (Note: 6th-round pick.)	To Ottawa Senators: Benoit Brunet	

=== Players acquired ===
Date	Player	Former team	Term	Via	Ref
July 13, 2001	Chris Herperger	Chicago Blackhawks		Free agency	
July 13, 2001	David Hymovitz	Los Angeles Kings		Free agency	
July 13, 2001	Joe Murphy	Rochester Americans (AHL)		Free agency	
July 13, 2001	Travis Richards	Grand Rapids Griffins (AHL)		Free agency	
July 27, 2001	Wade Brookbank	Orlando Solar Bears (IHL)	multi-year	Free agency	
August 30, 2001	Steve Martins	New York Islanders	1-year	Free agency	
January 24, 2002	Jody Hull	Philadelphia Flyers	1-year	Free agency	

=== Players lost ===
Date	Player	New team	Via (Note: In parentheses is the player's free agency group on July 1 if applicable.)	Ref
N/A	Konstantin Gorovikov	Salavat Yulaev Ufa (RSL)	Free agency (II) (Note: Ottawa retained Gorovikov’s NHL rights through the 2006–07 season.)	
N/A	Craig Millar	HC Slovan Bratislava (Slovakia)	Free agency (UFA)	
June 28, 2001	David Oliver	Munich Barons (DEL)	Free agency (UFA)	
July 1, 2001	Bob Prier (Note: Prier suffered a career ending injury early in the 1999–2000 season.)		Contract expiration (UFA)	
July 3, 2001	Jason York	Anaheim Mighty Ducks	Free agency (III)	
July 5, 2001	Mike Sillinger	Columbus Blue Jackets	Free agency (V)	
July 6, 2001	Rob Zamuner	Boston Bruins	Free agency (III)	
July 13, 2001	Derek King	Munich Barons (DEL)	Free agency (III)	
July 31, 2001	Chris Szysky	Grand Rapids Griffins (AHL)	Free agency (UFA)	
August 30, 2001	Eric Lacroix		Retirement (UFA)	
October 13, 2001	Jamie Rivers	Boston Bruins	Waivers	
November 13, 2001	Vyacheslav Butsayev	Lokomotiv Yaroslavl (RSL)	Free agency (UFA)	
January 19, 2002	Ivan Ciernik	Washington Capitals	Waivers	
April 19, 2002	Mike Fountain	HC Lada Togliatti (RSL)	Free agency	
May 3, 2002	John Gruden	Eisbaren Berlin (DEL)	Free agency	

=== Signings ===
Date	Player	Term	Contract type	Ref
July 2, 2001	Curtis Leschyshyn	multi-year	Re-signing	
July 4, 2001	Josh Langfeld	multi-year	Entry-level	
July 4, 2001	Julien Vauclair	multi-year	Entry-level	
July 13, 2001	Chris Bala		Entry-level	
July 13, 2001	Ivan Ciernik		Re-signing	
July 13, 2001	Toni Dahlman		Entry-level	
July 13, 2001	John Gruden		Re-signing	
July 23, 2001	Martin Prusek	multi-year	Entry-level	
July 24, 2001	Magnus Arvedson	2-year	Re-signing	
July 24, 2001	Patrick Lalime	3-year	Re-signing	
July 30, 2001	Joel Kwiatkowski	1-year	Re-signing	
July 30, 2001	Chris Phillips	1-year	Re-signing	
August 15, 2001	Wade Redden	2-year	Arbitration award	
September 6, 2001	Jason Spezza	multi-year	Entry-level	
September 21, 2001	Daniel Alfredsson	1-year	Re-signing	
September 24, 2001	Zdeno Chara	multi-year	Re-signing	
September 26, 2001	Marian Hossa	3-year	Re-signing	
February 28, 2002	Ray Emery	3-year	Entry-level	
March 9, 2002	Todd White	3-year	Extension	
May 29, 2002	Antoine Vermette	3-year	Entry-level	

== Draft picks ==
Ottawa's draft picks from the 2001 NHL entry draft held on June 23 and 24, 2001, at the National Car Rental Center in Sunrise, Florida.

Round	#	Player	Nationality	College/Junior/Club team (League)
1	2	Jason Spezza	Canada	Windsor Spitfires (OHL)
1	23	Tim Gleason	United States	Windsor Spitfires (OHL)
3	81	Neil Komadoski	United States	University of Notre Dame (NCAA)
4	99	Ray Emery	Canada	Sault Ste. Marie Greyhounds (OHL)
4	127	Christoph Schubert	Germany	Munich Barons (DEL)
5	162	Stefan Schauer	Germany	Riessersee SC (Germany)
6	193	Brooks Laich	Canada	Moose Jaw Warriors (WHL)
7	218	Jan Platil	Czech Republic	Barrie Colts (OHL)
7	223	Brandon Bochenski	United States	University of North Dakota (NCAA)
8	235	Neil Petruic	Canada	Kindersley Klippers (SJHL)
8	256	Gregg Johnson	United States	Boston University (NCAA)
9	286	Toni Dahlman	Finland	Ilves (SM-liiga)

== Farm teams ==
=== Grand Rapids Griffins ===
The Grand Rapids Griffins joined the American Hockey League for the 2001–02 season, as the International Hockey League folded. Bruce Cassidy remained the head coach of the Griffins.

The Griffins finished the season winning the West Division with a 42–27–11–0 record, earning 95 points. This placed the club in second place in the Western Conference. In the playoffs, Grand Rapids was upset by the Chicago Wolves in the conference quarter-finals.

Kip Miller led the team with 56 points in 41 games, however, he left the club on January 16 as he signed a free agent contract with the New York Islanders. Petr Schastlivy led Grand Rapids with 22 goals in only 35 games. Martin Prusek had a team best 18–8–5 record with a 1.83 GAA and a .930 save percentage. Prusek, Simon Lajeunesse and Mathieu Chouinard won the Harry "Hap" Holmes Memorial Award for the lowest goals against average in the league. Cassidy won the Louis A.R. Pieri Memorial Award for AHL Coach of the Year.

=== Mobile Mysticks ===
The Senators continued their ECHL affiliation with the Mobile Mysticks for the 2001–02 season. Jeff Pyle remained as the head coach of the team.

The Mysticks failed to qualify for the post-season, as they finished in fifth place in the Southwest Division with a 28–26–18 record, earning 74 points. Hugues Gervais led the Mysticks with 34 goals and 57 points. Greg Hewitt led the team with 20 wins, while Simon Lajeunesse posted a team best 2.86 GAA.

== See also ==
- 2001–02 NHL season
