= 2001–02 New York Rangers season =

NHL hockey team season

2001–02 New York Rangers
- Division: 4th Atlantic
- Conference: 11th Eastern
- 2001–02 record: 36–38–4–4
- Home record: 19–18–1–1
- Road record: 17–20–3–3
- Goals for: 227
- Goals against: 258

Team information
- General manager: Glen Sather
- Coach: Ron Low
- Captain: Mark Messier
- Alternate captains: Theoren Fleury; Brian Leetch; Eric Lindros
- Arena: Madison Square Garden
- Average attendance: 18,038 (99.1%)
- Minor league affiliates: Hartford Wolf Pack; Charlotte Checkers

Team leaders
- Goals: Eric Lindros (37)
- Assists: Brian Leetch (45)
- Points: Eric Lindros (73)
- Penalty minutes: Theoren Fleury (216)
- Plus/minus: Eric Lindros (+19)
- Wins: Mike Richter (24)
- Goals against average: Mike Richter (2.95)

The 2001–02 New York Rangers season was the franchise's 76th season. During the regular season, the Rangers finished fourth in the Atlantic Division, compiling a 36–38–4–4 record. Their 11th-place finish in the Eastern Conference kept them out of the Stanley Cup playoffs for the fifth straight season for the first time since the 1950–51 to 1954–55 seasons. Head coach Ron Low was fired after the season.

== Pre-season ==
On September 20, 2001, in the middle of a 2–2 game between the Philadelphia Flyers and New York Rangers, the game was stopped. A message from United States President George W. Bush about the September 11 attacks was broadcast on the arena video screen. After the message, the game did not resume and it was declared a 2–2 tie.

== Regular season ==
The Rangers struggled in short-handed situations, finishing the regular season with the most power-play opportunities against (398), the most power-play goals allowed (80) and the lowest penalty-kill percentage (79.90%).

=== Final standings ===
Atlantic Division
No.	CR		GP	W	L	T	OTL	GF	GA	Pts
1	2	**Philadelphia Flyers**	82	42	27	10	3	234	192	97
2	5	**New York Islanders**	82	42	28	8	4	239	220	96
3	6	**New Jersey Devils**	82	41	28	9	4	205	187	95
4	11	New York Rangers	82	36	38	4	4	227	258	80
5	12	Pittsburgh Penguins	82	28	41	8	5	198	249	69

Note: CR = Conference rank; GP = Games played; W = Wins; L = Losses; T = Ties; OTL = Overtime loss; GF = Goals for; GA = Goals against; Pts = Points
Bolded teams qualified for the playoffs.

Eastern Conference
R		Div	GP	W	L	T	OTL	GF	GA	Pts
**1**	**Z-** Boston Bruins	**NE**	**82**	**43**	**24**	**6**	**9**	**236**	**201**	101
**2**	**Y-** Philadelphia Flyers	**AT**	**82**	**42**	**27**	**10**	**3**	**234**	**192**	97
**3**	**Y-** Carolina Hurricanes	**SE**	**82**	**35**	**26**	**16**	**5**	**217**	**217**	91
**4**	**X-** Toronto Maple Leafs	**NE**	**82**	**43**	**25**	**10**	**4**	**249**	**207**	100
**5**	**X-** New York Islanders	**AT**	**82**	**42**	**28**	**8**	**4**	**239**	**220**	96
**6**	**X-** New Jersey Devils	**AT**	**82**	**41**	**28**	**9**	**4**	**205**	**187**	95
**7**	**X-** Ottawa Senators	**NE**	**82**	**39**	**27**	**9**	**7**	**243**	**208**	94
**8**	**X-** Montreal Canadiens	**NE**	**82**	**36**	**31**	**12**	**3**	**207**	**209**	87
8.5
9	Washington Capitals	SE	82	36	33	11	2	228	240	85
10	Buffalo Sabres	NE	82	35	35	11	1	213	200	82
11	New York Rangers	AT	82	36	38	4	4	227	258	80
12	Pittsburgh Penguins	AT	82	28	41	8	5	198	249	69
13	Tampa Bay Lightning	SE	82	27	40	11	4	178	219	69
14	Florida Panthers	SE	82	22	44	10	6	180	250	60
15	Atlanta Thrashers	SE	82	19	47	11	5	187	288	54

Divisions: AT – Atlantic, NE – Northeast, SE – Southeast

Z – Clinched conference; Y – Clinched division; X – Clinched playoff spot

== Schedule and results ==
2001–02 regular season
October: 6–6–1–0 (home: 3–3–0–0; road: 3–3–1–0)

Game	Date	Opponent	Score	Record	Recap
1	October 5, 2001	@ Carolina Hurricanes	3–1	0–1–0–0	L
2	October 7, 2001	Buffalo Sabres	5–4 OT	1–1–0–0	W
3	October 10, 2001	Washington Capitals	5–2	1–2–0–0	L
4	October 13, 2001	@ Ottawa Senators	2–2 OT	1–2–1–0	T
5	October 15, 2001	@ Montreal Canadiens	2–1	2–2–1–0	W
6	October 17, 2001	New Jersey Devils	4–3 OT	3–2–1–0	W
7	October 19, 2001	@ Atlanta Thrashers	4–3	4–2–1–0	W
8	October 20, 2001	@ Tampa Bay Lightning	5–2	4–3–1–0	L
9	October 22, 2001	San Jose Sharks	5–1	4–4–1–0	L
10	October 25, 2001	@ St. Louis Blues	5–1	4–5–1–0	L
11	October 27, 2001	@ Boston Bruins	2–1 OT	5–5–1–0	W
12	October 29, 2001	Dallas Stars	4–2	6–5–1–0	W
13	October 31, 2001	Florida Panthers	3–1	6–6–1–0	L

November: 9–3–1–1 (home: 6–1–0–0; road: 3–2–1–1)

Game	Date	Opponent	Score	Record	Recap
14	November 2, 2001	@ Carolina Hurricanes	3–2	6–7–1–0	L
15	November 3, 2001	@ Florida Panthers	5–3	7–7–1–0	W
16	November 6, 2001	Minnesota Wild	3–1	8–7–1–0	W
17	November 8, 2001	@ New York Islanders	6–2	9–7–1–0	W
18	November 10, 2001	@ Buffalo Sabres	4–2	10–7–1–0	W
19	November 11, 2001	Montreal Canadiens	3–2 OT	11–7–1–0	W
20	November 14, 2001	Philadelphia Flyers	4–2	12–7–1–0	W
21	November 17, 2001	@ Pittsburgh Penguins	1–0 OT	12–7–1–1	OTL
22	November 18, 2001	Atlanta Thrashers	6–2	13–7–1–1	W
23	November 20, 2001	Colorado Avalanche	5–3	14–7–1–1	W
24	November 23, 2001	@ Washington Capitals	6–2	14–8–1–1	L
25	November 25, 2001	Mighty Ducks of Anaheim	3–2	14–9–1–1	L
26	November 27, 2001	@ Buffalo Sabres	2–2 OT	14–9–2–1	T
27	November 29, 2001	Carolina Hurricanes	5–0	15–9–2–1	W

December: 7–6–1–1 (home: 4–3–0–1; road: 3–3–1–0)

Game	Date	Opponent	Score	Record	Recap
28	December 1, 2001	@ Montreal Canadiens	3–1	16–9–2–1	W
29	December 2, 2001	Tampa Bay Lightning	1–0	17–9–2–1	W
30	December 4, 2001	@ Washington Capitals	5–2	17–10–2–1	L
31	December 6, 2001	Toronto Maple Leafs	6–3	17–11–2–1	L
32	December 8, 2001	@ Toronto Maple Leafs	4–3	17–12–2–1	L
33	December 10, 2001	Carolina Hurricanes	4–3 OT	17–12–2–2	OTL
34	December 12, 2001	Nashville Predators	4–2	17–13–2–2	L
35	December 15, 2001	Buffalo Sabres	4–2	18–13–2–2	W
36	December 17, 2001	Florida Panthers	4–2	19–13–2–2	W
37	December 19, 2001	New Jersey Devils	2–2 OT	19–13–3–2	T
38	December 21, 2001	New York Islanders	2–1	19–14–3–2	L
39	December 23, 2001	Ottawa Senators	3–2	20–14–3–2	W
40	December 28, 2001	@ San Jose Sharks	5–3	21–14–3–2	W
41	December 29, 2001	@ Los Angeles Kings	5–4	22–14–3–2	W
42	December 31, 2001	@ Phoenix Coyotes	5–0	22–15–3–2	L

January: 3–8–1–1 (home: 2–2–1–0; road: 1–6–0–1)

Game	Date	Opponent	Score	Record	Recap
43	January 2, 2002	@ Edmonton Oilers	4–1	22–16–3–2	L
44	January 3, 2002	@ Colorado Avalanche	3–2 OT	22–16–3–3	OTL
45	January 5, 2002	@ Pittsburgh Penguins	4–1	22–17–3–3	L
46	January 9, 2002	Los Angeles Kings	4–0	22–18–3–3	L
47	January 12, 2002	@ Philadelphia Flyers	4–2	22–19–3–3	L
48	January 14, 2002	Columbus Blue Jackets	2–2 OT	22–19–4–3	T
49	January 16, 2002	@ Columbus Blue Jackets	2–0	22–20–4–3	L
50	January 17, 2002	@ New Jersey Devils	6–4	22–21–4–3	L
51	January 22, 2002	@ New York Islanders	5–4	23–21–4–3	W
52	January 23, 2002	Boston Bruins	8–4	24–21–4–3	W
53	January 26, 2002	Washington Capitals	6–3	25–21–4–3	W
54	January 28, 2002	Tampa Bay Lightning	1–0	25–22–4–3	L
55	January 30, 2002	New York Islanders	6–3	25–23–4–3	L

February: 2–4–0–0 (home: 1–2–0–0; road: 1–2–0–0)

Game	Date	Opponent	Score	Record	Recap
56	February 6, 2002	@ Detroit Red Wings	3–1	25–24–4–3	L
57	February 8, 2002	@ Atlanta Thrashers	2–1	26–24–4–3	W
58	February 10, 2002	Pittsburgh Penguins	4–3	27–24–4–3	W
59	February 13, 2002	@ Dallas Stars	4–2	27–25–4–3	L
60	February 26, 2002	New Jersey Devils	4–3	27–26–4–3	L
61	February 28, 2002	Ottawa Senators	3–0	27–27–4–3	L

March: 5–9–0–1 (home: 2–6–0–0; road: 3–3–0–1)

Game	Date	Opponent	Score	Record	Recap
62	March 2, 2002	Philadelphia Flyers	6–5	28–27–4–3	W
63	March 4, 2002	Calgary Flames	5–3	28–28–4–3	L
64	March 5, 2002	@ Minnesota Wild	3–2 OT	29–28–4–3	W
65	March 7, 2002	@ Chicago Blackhawks	5–1	29–29–4–3	L
66	March 9, 2002	@ Pittsburgh Penguins	3–2 OT	29–29–4–4	OTL
67	March 11, 2002	Montreal Canadiens	2–1	30–29–4–4	W
68	March 13, 2002	Boston Bruins	3–1	30–30–4–4	L
69	March 16, 2002	@ New Jersey Devils	3–1	30–31–4–4	L
70	March 17, 2002	Detroit Red Wings	5–3	30–32–4–4	L
71	March 19, 2002	Vancouver Canucks	3–1	30–33–4–4	L
72	March 21, 2002	@ Ottawa Senators	5–2	31–33–4–4	W
73	March 22, 2002	Atlanta Thrashers	5–2	31–34–4–4	L
74	March 25, 2002	@ New York Islanders	4–2	31–35–4–4	L
75	March 27, 2002	Philadelphia Flyers	4–2	31–36–4–4	L
76	March 30, 2002	@ Florida Panthers	4–2	32–36–4–4	W

April: 4–2–0–0 (home: 1–1–0–0; road: 3–1–0–0)

Game	Date	Opponent	Score	Record	Recap
77	April 1, 2002	@ Tampa Bay Lightning	6–4	33–36–4–4	W
78	April 4, 2002	@ Toronto Maple Leafs	4–2	34–36–4–4	W
79	April 6, 2002	@ Boston Bruins	6–4	35–36–4–4	W
80	April 8, 2002	Pittsburgh Penguins	3–2	36–36–4–4	W
81	April 10, 2002	Toronto Maple Leafs	7–2	36–37–4–4	L
82	April 13, 2002	@ Philadelphia Flyers	2–1	36–38–4–4	L

Legend: W Win (2 points) L Loss (0 points) T Tie (1 point) OTL Overtime loss (1 point)

== Player statistics ==
=== Scoring ===
- Position abbreviations: C = Center; D = Defense; G = Goaltender; LW = Left wing; RW = Right wing
- † = Joined team via a transaction (e.g., trade, waivers, signing) during the season. Stats reflect time with the Rangers only.
- ‡ = Left team via a transaction (e.g., trade, waivers, release) during the season. Stats reflect time with the Rangers only.

No.	Player	Pos	Regular season					
No.	Player	Pos	GP	G	A	Pts	+/-	PIM
88	Eric Lindros	C	72	37	36	73	19	138
14	Theoren Fleury	LW	82	24	39	63	0	216
16	Mike York‡	RW	69	18	39	57	8	16
2	Brian Leetch	D	82	10	45	55	14	28
93	Petr Nedved	C	78	21	25	46	−8	36
20	Radek Dvorak	RW	65	17	20	37	−20	14
23	Vladimir Malakhov	D	81	6	22	28	10	83
26	Andreas Johansson	LW	70	14	10	24	6	46
10	Sandy McCarthy	RW	82	10	13	23	−8	171
11	Mark Messier	C	41	7	16	23	−1	32
34	Bryan Berard	D	82	2	21	23	−1	60
36	Matthew Barnaby†	RW	48	8	13	21	−3	144
9	Pavel Bure†	RW	12	12	8	20	9	6
37	Mikael Samuelsson	RW	67	6	10	16	10	23
6	Manny Malhotra‡	C	56	7	6	13	−1	42
18	Zdeno Ciger‡	LW	29	6	7	13	−3	16
19	Martin Rucinsky†	LW	15	3	10	13	6	6
32	Jeff Toms‡	C	38	7	4	11	−4	10
33	Dave Karpa	D	75	1	10	11	−9	131
3	Tom Poti†	D	11	1	7	8	−4	2
55	Igor Ulanov‡	D	39	0	6	6	−4	53
8	Michal Grosek	RW	15	3	2	5	−3	12
24	Sylvain Lefebvre	D	41	0	5	5	−3	23
22	Tomas Kloucek	D	52	1	3	4	−2	137
5	Dale Purinton	D	40	0	4	4	4	113
21	Steve McKenna	LW	54	2	1	3	0	144
17	Rem Murray†	C	11	1	2	3	−9	4
29	Roman Lyashenko†	C	15	2	0	2	0	0
29	Darren Van Impe‡	D	17	1	0	1	3	12
25	Peter Smrek‡	D	8	0	1	1	−7	4
31	Dan Blackburn	G	31	0	0	0		10
27	Jason Dawe	RW	1	0	0	0	−1	0
38	Rico Fata	RW	10	0	0	0	−2	0
47	Barrett Heisten‡	C	10	0	0	0	−4	2
40	Johan Holmqvist	G	1	0	0	0		0
4	Mike Mottau	D	1	0	0	0	0	0
35	Mike Richter	G	55	0	0	0		4
13	Richard Scott	LW	5	0	0	0	0	5
39	Trent Whitfield†‡	C	1	0	0	0	1	0

=== Goaltending ===
No.	Player	Regular season									
No.	Player	GP	W	L	T	SA	GA	GAA	SV%	SO	TOI
35	Mike Richter	55	24	26	4	1832	157	2.95	.906	2	3195
31	Dan Blackburn	31	12	16	0	1030	95	3.28	.898	0	1737
40	Johan Holmqvist	1	0	0	0	2	0	0.00	1.000	0	9

== Awards and records ==
=== Awards ===
Type	Award/honor	Recipient	Ref
League (annual)	NHL All-Rookie Team	Dan Blackburn (Goaltender)	
League (in-season)	NHL All-Star Game selection	Brian Leetch	
League (in-season)	NHL All-Star Game selection	Eric Lindros (Note: Lindros did not play and was replaced by York.)	
League (in-season)	NHL All-Star Game selection	Mike York	
League (in-season)	NHL Player of the Week	Mike Richter (December 3)	
League (in-season)	NHL YoungStars Game selection	Dan Blackburn	
Team	Ceil Saidel Memorial Award	Brian Leetch	
Team	Frank Boucher Trophy	Mike Richter	
Team	Good Guy Award	Brian Leetch	
Team	Lars-Erik Sjoberg Award	Dan Blackburn	
Team	Players' Player Award	Brian Leetch	
Team	Rangers MVP	Mike Richter	
Team	Rookie of the Year	Dan Blackburn	
Team	Steven McDonald Extra Effort Award	Sandy McCarthy	

=== Milestones ===
Milestone	Player	Date	Ref
First game	Barrett Heisten	October 5, 2001	
First game	Dan Blackburn	October 10, 2001	
First game	Richard Scott	October 27, 2001	
1,000th point	Theoren Fleury	October 29, 2001	
1,000th game played	Theoren Fleury	January 23, 2002	
600th assist	Theoren Fleury	January 23, 2002	
1,000th game played	Brian Leetch	February 28, 2002	

== Transactions ==
The Rangers were involved in the following transactions from June 10, 2001, through June 13, 2002.

=== Trades ===
Date	Details		Ref
June 23, 2001	To New York Rangers: Chris St. Croix	To Calgary Flames: Burke Henry	
June 23, 2001	To New York Rangers: 3rd-round pick in 2001; 5th-round pick in 2001	To Minnesota Wild: 3rd-round pick in 2001	
June 24, 2001	To New York Rangers: Christian Gosselin; Mikael Samuelsson	To San Jose Sharks: Adam Graves (Note: The Rangers agreed to pay two-thirds of Graves’ remaining salary on his contract.)	
June 24, 2001	To New York Rangers: 8th-round pick in 2001	To Atlanta Thrashers: Rights to Jeff Dessner	
June 24, 2001	To New York Rangers: 7th-round pick in 2001	To Calgary Flames: 7th-round pick in 2002	
June 29, 2001	To New York Rangers: Sean Gagnon; Future considerations	To Ottawa Senators: Jason Doig; Jeff Ulmer	
June 29, 2001	To New York Rangers: Conditional 7th-round pick in 2002	To San Jose Sharks: Rich Pilon	
June 30, 2001	To New York Rangers: Dave Duerden	To Florida Panthers: Future considerations	
June 30, 2001	To New York Rangers: Nils Ekman; Kyle Freadrich	To Tampa Bay Lightning: Tim Taylor (Note: The Rangers agreed to pay two-thirds of Taylor's remaining salary on his contract.)	
August 20, 2001	To New York Rangers: Rights to Eric Lindros; Conditional 1st-round pick in 2003 (Note: Condition not met. The Rangers would have received a 2003 first-round draft pick if Lindros suffered a concussion in the pre-season or the first fifty games of the regular season and didn't return to action for at least twelve months.)	To Philadelphia Flyers: Pavel Brendl; Jan Hlavac; Kim Johnsson; 3rd-round pick in 2003	
December 12, 2001	To New York Rangers: Matthew Barnaby	To Tampa Bay Lightning: Zdeno Ciger	
March 12, 2002	To New York Rangers: Roman Lyashenko; Martin Rucinsky	To Dallas Stars: Barrett Heisten; Manny Malhotra	
March 18, 2002	To New York Rangers: Pavel Bure; 2nd-round pick in 2002	To Florida Panthers: Igor Ulanov; Rights to Filip Novak; 1st-round pick in 2002; 2nd-round pick in 2002; 4th-round pick in 2003	
March 19, 2002	To New York Rangers: Richard Lintner	To Nashville Predators: Peter Smrek	
March 19, 2002	To New York Rangers: Rem Murray; Tom Poti	To Edmonton Oilers: Mike York; 4th-round pick in 2002	

=== Players acquired ===
Date	Player	Former team	Term	Via	Ref
June 11, 2001	Barrett Heisten	Seattle Thunderbirds (WHL)		Free agency	
June 12, 2001	Matt Kinch	Calgary Hitmen (WHL)		Free agency	
June 13, 2001	Layne Ulmer	Swift Current Broncos (WHL)		Free agency	
June 26, 2001	Scott Meyer	St. Cloud State University (WCHA)		Free agency	
July 1, 2001	Dave Karpa	Carolina Hurricanes		Free agency	
July 1, 2001	Igor Ulanov	Edmonton Oilers		Free agency	
July 17, 2001	Zdeno Ciger	HC Slovan Bratislava (Slovakia)		Free agency	
August 7, 2001	Darren Van Impe	Boston Bruins		Waivers	
August 23, 2001	P. J. Stock	Philadelphia Flyers		Free agency	
August 28, 2001	Steve McKenna	Pittsburgh Penguins		Free agency	
September 15, 2001	Rory Rawlyk	Medicine Hat Tigers (WHL)		Free agency	
October 3, 2001	Rico Fata	Calgary Flames		Waivers	
October 4, 2001	Bryan Berard	Toronto Maple Leafs		Free agency	
January 16, 2002	Trent Whitfield	Washington Capitals		Waivers	
March 19, 2002	Bobby Andrews	University of Alaska Fairbanks (CCHA)		Free agency	
June 12, 2002	Benoit Dusablon	Hartford Wolf Pack (AHL)		Free agency	

=== Players lost ===
Date	Player	New team	Via (Note: In parentheses is the player's free agency group on July 1 if applicable.)	Ref
June 30, 2001	Colin Forbes	Utah Grizzlies (AHL) (Note: Forbes signed with Utah on November 15.)	Buyout	
June 30, 2001	Valeri Kamensky	Dallas Stars (Note: Kamensky signed with Dallas on July 5.)	Buyout	
July 1, 2001	Guy Hebert (Note: Hebert retired.)		Buyout	
July 1, 2001	Kirk McLean (Note: McLean retired.)		Contract expiration (III)	
July 18, 2001	Derek Armstrong	SC Bern (NLA)	Free agency (II) (Note: The Rangers retained Armstrong's NHL rights until trading them to the Los Angeles Kings on July 16, 2002.)	
July 23, 2001	Tony Tuzzolino	Boston Bruins	Free agency (VI)	
July 27, 2001	Drew Bannister	Anaheim Mighty Ducks	Free agency (UFA)	
July 31, 2001	Brad Brown	Minnesota Wild	Free agency (UFA)	
August 10, 2001	David Wilkie	Augusta Lynx (ECHL)	Free agency (UFA)	
August 21, 2001	Ryan Tobler	Tampa Bay Lightning	Free agency (UFA)	
September 14, 2001	Nils Ekman	Djurgardens IF (SHL)	Free agency (II) (Note: The Rangers retained Ekman's NHL rights and re-signed him on July 9, 2002.)	
September 28, 2001	P. J. Stock	Boston Bruins	Waiver draft	
September 29, 2001	Ben Carpentier	Providence Bruins (AHL)	Free agency (UFA)	
December 18, 2001	Darren Van Impe	Florida Panthers	Waivers	
January 31, 2002	Martin Richter	HC Sparta Praha (ELH)	Free agency (Note: The Rangers retained Richter's NHL rights and re-signed him on June 19, 2006.)	
February 1, 2002	Trent Whitfield	Washington Capitals	Waivers	
March 16, 2002	Jeff Toms	Pittsburgh Penguins	Waivers	

=== Signings ===
Date	Player	Term	Contract type	Ref
June 21, 2001	Andreas Johansson		Re-signing	
July 10, 2001	Vitali Yeremeyev		Re-signing	
July 16, 2001	Fedor Tyutin		Entry-level	
July 24, 2001	Sandy McCarthy		Re-signing	
August 6, 2001	Manny Malhotra		Re-signing	
August 7, 2001	Jeff Toms		Re-signing	
August 8, 2001	Jason Dawe		Re-signing	
August 9, 2001	Brad Smyth	1-year	Re-signing	
August 20, 2001	Eric Lindros	4-year	Re-signing	
September 16, 2001	Petr Nedved		Re-signing	
October 1, 2001	Dan Blackburn		Entry-level	

== Draft picks ==
New York's picks at the 2001 NHL entry draft in Sunrise, Florida at the National Car Rental Center.

Round	#	Player	Position	Nationality	College/Junior/Club team (League)
1	10	Dan Blackburn	G	Canada	Kootenay Ice (WHL)
2	40	Fedor Tyutin	D	Russia	SKA Saint Petersburg (Russia)
3	79	Garth Murray	C	Canada	Regina Pats (WHL)
4	113	Bryce Lampman	D	United States	Omaha Lancers (USHL)
5	139	Shawn Collymore	RW	Canada	Quebec Remparts (QMJHL)
6	176	Marek Zidlicky	D	Czech Republic	HIFK (FNL)
7	206	Petr Preucil	LW	Czech Republic	Quebec Remparts (QMJHL)
7	226	Pontus Petterstrom	LW	Sweden	Tingsryds (Sweden)
8	230	Leonid Zhvachkin	D	Russia	Podolsk Jr. (Russia)
8	238	Ryan Hollweg	C	United States	Medicine Hat Tigers (WHL)
9	269	Juris Stals	C	Czech Republic	Lukko (FNL)

== See also ==
- 2001–02 NHL season
