= 2001–02 Boston Bruins season =

NHL team season

2001–02 Boston Bruins
- Northeast Division champions
- Division: 1st Northeast
- Conference: 1st Eastern
- 2001–02 record: 43–24–6–9
- Home record: 23–11–2–5
- Road record: 20–13–4–4
- Goals for: 236
- Goals against: 201

Team information
- General manager: Mike O'Connell
- Coach: Robbie Ftorek
- Captain: Vacant
- Alternate captains: Bill Guerin; Martin Lapointe; Don Sweeney
- Arena: Fleet Center
- Average attendance: 15,403 (87.7%)
- Minor league affiliates: Providence Bruins; Greenville Grrrowl

Team leaders
- Goals: Bill Guerin (41)
- Assists: Jozef Stumpel (47)
- Points: Sergei Samsonov (70)
- Penalty minutes: Andrei Nazarov (164)
- Plus/minus: Sean O'Donnell (+27)
- Wins: Byron Dafoe (35)
- Goals against average: Byron Dafoe (2.21)

The 2001–02 Boston Bruins season was the Boston Bruins's 78th season of operation. The Bruins qualified for the playoffs, losing in the first round to the Montreal Canadiens.

== Offseason ==
After barely missing the playoffs the previous season, the Bruins went on a free-agent signing spree under new general manager Mike O'Connell. The team signed high-profile free agents: forwards Martin Lapointe, Bill Guerin, Rob Zamuner, and Scott Pellerin, and defenseman Sean O'Donnell.

Two more major pieces for the Bruins came thanks to a contract holdout by captain Jason Allison. After failing to report to training camp and missing all of the pre-season, Allison was traded to the Los Angeles Kings in exchange for two former Bruins: Glen Murray and Jozef Stumpel. The two proved to be invaluable to the team, as Stumpel led the team in assists and Murray finished second on the team in goals, more than making up for Allison's production.

== Regular season ==
On October 25, 2001, Joe Thornton scored just 12 seconds into the overtime period to give the Bruins a 2–1 home win over the Toronto Maple Leafs. It would prove to be the fastest overtime goal scored during the 2001–02 regular season.

The Bruins finished the regular season with the highest penalty-kill percentage, at 87.11%.

=== Final standings ===
Northeast Division
No.	CR		GP	W	L	T	OTL	GF	GA	Pts
1	1	**Boston Bruins**	82	43	24	6	9	236	201	101
2	4	**Toronto Maple Leafs**	82	43	25	10	4	249	207	100
3	7	**Ottawa Senators**	82	39	27	9	7	243	208	94
4	8	**Montreal Canadiens**	82	36	31	12	3	207	209	87
5	10	Buffalo Sabres	82	35	35	11	1	213	200	82

Note: CR = Conference rank; GP = Games played; W = Wins; L = Losses; T = Ties; OTL = Overtime loss; GF = Goals for; GA = Goals against; Pts = Points
Bolded teams qualified for the playoffs.

Eastern Conference
R		Div	GP	W	L	T	OTL	GF	GA	Pts
**1**	**Z-** Boston Bruins	**NE**	**82**	**43**	**24**	**6**	**9**	**236**	**201**	101
**2**	**Y-** Philadelphia Flyers	**AT**	**82**	**42**	**27**	**10**	**3**	**234**	**192**	97
**3**	**Y-** Carolina Hurricanes	**SE**	**82**	**35**	**26**	**16**	**5**	**217**	**217**	91
**4**	**X-** Toronto Maple Leafs	**NE**	**82**	**43**	**25**	**10**	**4**	**249**	**207**	100
**5**	**X-** New York Islanders	**AT**	**82**	**42**	**28**	**8**	**4**	**239**	**220**	96
**6**	**X-** New Jersey Devils	**AT**	**82**	**41**	**28**	**9**	**4**	**205**	**187**	95
**7**	**X-** Ottawa Senators	**NE**	**82**	**39**	**27**	**9**	**7**	**243**	**208**	94
**8**	**X-** Montreal Canadiens	**NE**	**82**	**36**	**31**	**12**	**3**	**207**	**209**	87
8.5
9	Washington Capitals	SE	82	36	33	11	2	228	240	85
10	Buffalo Sabres	NE	82	35	35	11	1	213	200	82
11	New York Rangers	AT	82	36	38	4	4	227	258	80
12	Pittsburgh Penguins	AT	82	28	41	8	5	198	249	69
13	Tampa Bay Lightning	SE	82	27	40	11	4	178	219	69
14	Florida Panthers	SE	82	22	44	10	6	180	250	60
15	Atlanta Thrashers	SE	82	19	47	11	5	187	288	54

Divisions: AT – Atlantic, NE – Northeast, SE – Southeast

Z – Clinched conference; Y – Clinched division; X – Clinched playoff spot

== Schedule and results ==
=== Regular season ===
2001–02 regular season
October: 5–3–3–2 (home: 4–0–0–2; road: 1–3–3–0)

Game	Date	Score	Opponent	Record	Recap
1	October 4, 2001	4–2	Mighty Ducks of Anaheim (2001–02)	1–0–0–0	W
2	October 6, 2001	4–3 OT	Atlanta Thrashers (2001–02)	2–0–0–0	W
3	October 8, 2001	4–0	Washington Capitals (2001–02)	3–0–0–0	W
4	October 10, 2001	1–2	@ Minnesota Wild (2001–02)	3–1–0–0	L
5	October 13, 2001	2–3	@ San Jose Sharks (2001–02)	3–2–0–0	L
6	October 16, 2001	1–1 OT	@ Phoenix Coyotes (2001–02)	3–2–1–0	T
7	October 17, 2001	2–2 OT	@ Mighty Ducks of Anaheim (2001–02)	3–2–2–0	T
8	October 20, 2001	2–1	@ Nashville Predators (2001–02)	4–2–2–0	W
9	October 23, 2001	0–2	@ Toronto Maple Leafs (2001–02)	4–3–2–0	L
10	October 25, 2001	2–1 OT	Toronto Maple Leafs (2001–02)	5–3–2–0	W
11	October 27, 2001	1–2 OT	New York Rangers (2001–02)	5–3–2–1	OTL
12	October 28, 2001	3–3 OT	@ Chicago Blackhawks (2001–02)	5–3–3–1	T
13	October 30, 2001	3–4 OT	New Jersey Devils (2001–02)	5–3–3–2	OTL

November: 8–4–0–0 (home: 6–2–0–0; road: 2–2–0–0)

Game	Date	Score	Opponent	Record	Recap
14	November 3, 2001	2–1	@ New Jersey Devils (2001–02)	6–3–3–2	W
15	November 6, 2001	1–0 OT	Edmonton Oilers (2001–02)	7–3–3–2	W
16	November 8, 2001	3–5	Minnesota Wild (2001–02)	7–4–3–2	L
17	November 10, 2001	1–5	Columbus Blue Jackets (2001–02)	7–5–3–2	L
18	November 13, 2001	5–3	Montreal Canadiens (2001–02)	8–5–3–2	W
19	November 15, 2001	5–4 OT	New Jersey Devils (2001–02)	9–5–3–2	W
20	November 17, 2001	3–1	Buffalo Sabres (2001–02)	10–5–3–2	W
21	November 20, 2001	2–3	@ Montreal Canadiens (2001–02)	10–6–3–2	L
22	November 23, 2001	3–2	Vancouver Canucks (2001–02)	11–6–3–2	W
23	November 24, 2001	0–2	@ Toronto Maple Leafs (2001–02)	11–7–3–2	L
24	November 27, 2001	6–3	Tampa Bay Lightning (2001–02)	12–7–3–2	W
25	November 29, 2001	3–2 OT	@ Philadelphia Flyers (2001–02)	13–7–3–2	W

December: 8–4–0–2 (home: 3–2–0–1; road: 5–2–0–1)

Game	Date	Score	Opponent	Record	Recap
26	December 1, 2001	1–2 OT	@ Ottawa Senators (2001–02)	13–7–3–3	OTL
27	December 4, 2001	3–2	@ Atlanta Thrashers (2001–02)	14–7–3–3	W
28	December 6, 2001	1–4	Pittsburgh Penguins (2001–02)	14–8–3–3	L
29	December 8, 2001	4–2	Buffalo Sabres (2001–02)	15–8–3–3	W
30	December 12, 2001	4–2	@ Pittsburgh Penguins (2001–02)	16–8–3–3	W
31	December 13, 2001	1–2	@ Washington Capitals (2001–02)	16–9–3–3	L
32	December 15, 2001	2–5	Philadelphia Flyers (2001–02)	16–10–3–3	L
33	December 18, 2001	2–3 OT	Atlanta Thrashers (2001–02)	16–10–3–4	OTL
34	December 20, 2001	5–0	Montreal Canadiens (2001–02)	17–10–3–4	W
35	December 22, 2001	4–2	@ New York Islanders (2001–02)	18–10–3–4	W
36	December 26, 2001	3–2	Ottawa Senators (2001–02)	19–10–3–4	W
37	December 28, 2001	7–1	@ Florida Panthers (2001–02)	20–10–3–4	W
38	December 29, 2001	5–4 OT	@ Tampa Bay Lightning (2001–02)	21–10–3–4	W
39	December 31, 2001	1–2	@ Dallas Stars (2001–02)	21–11–3–4	L

January: 8–4–0–3 (home: 5–2–0–1; road: 3–2–0–2)

Game	Date	Score	Opponent	Record	Recap
40	January 2, 2002	6–3	@ Carolina Hurricanes (2001–02)	22–11–3–4	W
41	January 3, 2002	1–2	Toronto Maple Leafs (2001–02)	22–12–3–4	L
42	January 5, 2002	7–4	Washington Capitals (2001–02)	23–12–3–4	W
43	January 8, 2002	3–2	@ Pittsburgh Penguins (2001–02)	24–12–3–4	W
44	January 10, 2002	5–0	Los Angeles Kings (2001–02)	25–12–3–4	W
45	January 12, 2002	4–5	New York Islanders (2001–02)	25–13–3–4	L
46	January 14, 2002	0–1 OT	@ Washington Capitals (2001–02)	25–13–3–5	OTL
47	January 17, 2002	5–2	Ottawa Senators (2001–02)	26–13–3–5	W
48	January 19, 2002	1–2 OT	@ St. Louis Blues (2001–02)	26–13–3–6	OTL
49	January 21, 2002	3–4 OT	St. Louis Blues (2001–02)	26–13–3–7	OTL
50	January 23, 2002	4–8	@ New York Rangers (2001–02)	26–14–3–7	L
51	January 24, 2002	3–4	@ Ottawa Senators (2001–02)	26–15–3–7	L
52	January 26, 2002	4–2	Florida Panthers (2001–02)	27–15–3–7	W
53	January 28, 2002	2–1	Chicago Blackhawks (2001–02)	28–15–3–7	W
54	January 30, 2002	4–3 OT	@ Montreal Canadiens (2001–02)	29–15–3–7	W

February: 3–2–2–0 (home: 1–1–1–0; road: 2–1–1–0)

Game	Date	Score	Opponent	Record	Recap
55	February 4, 2002	8–0	@ Columbus Blue Jackets (2001–02)	30–15–3–7	W
56	February 5, 2002	2–2 OT	Buffalo Sabres (2001–02)	30–15–4–7	T
57	February 9, 2002	4–1	Florida Panthers (2001–02)	31–15–4–7	W
58	February 11, 2002	2–5	@ Colorado Avalanche (2001–02)	31–16–4–7	L
59	February 12, 2002	2–1 OT	@ Vancouver Canucks (2001–02)	32–16–4–7	W
60	February 26, 2002	3–3 OT	@ New York Islanders (2001–02)	32–16–5–7	T
61	February 28, 2002	2–6	Carolina Hurricanes (2001–02)	32–17–5–7	L

March: 9–5–0–0 (home: 3–3–0–0; road: 6–2–0–0)

Game	Date	Score	Opponent	Record	Recap
62	March 1, 2002	3–4	@ Buffalo Sabres (2001–02)	32–18–5–7	L
63	March 4, 2002	1–4	Philadelphia Flyers (2001–02)	32–19–5–7	L
64	March 6, 2002	3–5	@ Montreal Canadiens (2001–02)	32–20–5–7	L
65	March 8, 2002	3–0	@ Atlanta Thrashers (2001–02)	33–20–5–7	W
66	March 9, 2002	3–2	Calgary Flames (2001–02)	34–20–5–7	W
67	March 13, 2002	3–1	@ New York Rangers (2001–02)	35–20–5–7	W
68	March 14, 2002	1–2	Toronto Maple Leafs (2001–02)	35–21–5–7	L
69	March 16, 2002	2–1	Detroit Red Wings (2001–02)	36–21–5–7	W
70	March 19, 2002	4–2	Phoenix Coyotes (2001–02)	37–21–5–7	W
71	March 21, 2002	2–1	@ Buffalo Sabres (2001–02)	38–21–5–7	W
72	March 23, 2002	3–1	@ Florida Panthers (2001–02)	39–21–5–7	W
73	March 24, 2002	4–3 OT	@ Tampa Bay Lightning (2001–02)	40–21–5–7	W
74	March 26, 2002	3–2	@ Carolina Hurricanes (2001–02)	41–21–5–7	W
75	March 30, 2002	0–2	Carolina Hurricanes (2001–02)	41–22–5–7	L

April: 2–2–1–2 (home: 1–1–1–1; road: 1–1–0–1)

Game	Date	Score	Opponent	Record	Recap
76	April 2, 2002	4–2	@ Philadelphia Flyers (2001–02)	42–22–5–7	W
77	April 4, 2002	1–2 OT	New York Islanders (2001–02)	42–22–5–8	OTL
78	April 6, 2002	4–6	New York Rangers (2001–02)	42–23–5–8	L
79	April 7, 2002	2–3 OT	@ New Jersey Devils (2001–02)	42–23–5–9	OTL
80	April 9, 2002	2–2 OT	Tampa Bay Lightning (2001–02)	42–23–6–9	T
81	April 11, 2002	0–4	@ Ottawa Senators (2001–02)	42–24–6–9	L
82	April 13, 2002	7–1	Pittsburgh Penguins (2001–02)	43–24–6–9	W

Legend: W Win (2 points) L Loss (0 points) T Tie (1 point) OTL Overtime loss (1 point)

=== Playoffs ===
2002 Stanley Cup playoffs
Eastern Conference Quarterfinals vs. (8) Montreal Canadiens – Canadiens win 4–2

Game	Date	Score	Opponent	Series	Recap
1	April 18, 2002	2–5	Montreal Canadiens	Canadiens lead 1–0	L
2	April 21, 2002	6–4	Montreal Canadiens	Series tied 1–1	W
3	April 23, 2002	3–5	@ Montreal Canadiens	Canadiens lead 2–1	L
4	April 25, 2002	5–2	@ Montreal Canadiens	Series tied 2–2	W
5	April 27, 2002	1–2	Montreal Canadiens	Canadiens lead 3–2	L
6	April 29, 2002	1–2	@ Montreal Canadiens	Canadiens win 4–2	L

Legend: W Win L Loss

== Player statistics ==
=== Scoring ===
- Position abbreviations: C = Center; D = Defense; G = Goaltender; LW = Left wing; RW = Right wing
- † = Joined team via a transaction (e.g., trade, waivers, signing) during the season. Stats reflect time with the Bruins only.
- ‡ = Left team via a transaction (e.g., trade, waivers, release) during the season. Stats reflect time with the Bruins only.

No.	Player	Pos	Regular season						Playoffs					
No.	Player	Pos	GP	G	A	Pts	+/-	PIM	GP	G	A	Pts	+/-	PIM
14	Sergei Samsonov	LW	74	29	41	70	21	27	6	2	2	4	−2	0
19	Joe Thornton	C	66	22	46	68	7	127	6	2	4	6	0	10
13	Bill Guerin	RW	78	41	25	66	−1	91	6	4	2	6	−2	6
12	Brian Rolston	C	82	31	31	62	11	30	6	4	1	5	−1	0
27 (Note: Murray wore number 21 in his first three games after being acquired.)	Glen Murray†	RW	73	35	25	60	26	40	6	1	4	5	−1	4
16	Jozef Stumpel†	C	72	7	47	54	21	14	6	0	2	2	−2	0
20	Martin Lapointe	RW	68	17	23	40	12	101	6	1	2	3	−2	12
17	Rob Zamuner	LW	66	12	13	25	6	24	6	0	2	2	−2	4
21 (Note: O'Donnell wore number 27 in his first twelve games.)	Sean O'Donnell	D	80	3	22	25	27	89	6	0	2	2	−2	4
11	P. J. Axelsson	LW	78	7	17	24	6	16	6	2	1	3	2	6
25	Hal Gill	D	79	4	18	22	16	77	6	0	1	1	1	2
44	Nick Boynton	D	80	4	14	18	18	107	6	1	2	3	2	8
32	Don Sweeney	D	81	3	15	18	22	35	6	0	1	1	−3	2
26	Mike Knuble	RW	54	8	6	14	9	42	2	0	0	0	0	0
33	Benoit Hogue†‡	C	17	4	4	8	−3	9	—	—	—	—	—	—
18	Kyle McLaren	D	38	0	8	8	−4	19	4	0	0	0	2	20
31	Jamie Rivers†	D	64	4	2	6	6	45	3	0	0	0	0	0
33	Scott Pellerin‡	LW	35	1	5	6	−6	6	—	—	—	—	—	—
10	Marty McInnis†	RW	19	2	3	5	−1	8	6	0	1	1	0	0
22 (Note: Bonvie wore number 76 in his first game.)	Dennis Bonvie†	RW	23	1	2	3	3	84	1	0	0	0	0	0
55	Jonathan Girard	D	20	0	3	3	0	9	1	0	0	0	0	2
64	Jarno Kultanen	D	38	0	3	3	−1	33	—	—	—	—	—	—
42	P. J. Stock	C	58	0	3	3	−2	122	6	1	0	1	0	19
23	John Emmons	C	22	0	2	2	−4	16	—	—	—	—	—	—
6	Gord Murphy†‡	D	15	0	2	2	2	13	—	—	—	—	—	—
62	Andrei Nazarov‡	LW	47	0	2	2	−2	164	—	—	—	—	—	—
29	Andy Hilbert	C	6	1	0	1	−2	2	—	—	—	—	—	—
23	Sean Brown†	D	12	0	1	1	−1	47	4	0	0	0	0	2
34	Byron Dafoe	G	64	0	1	1		27	6	0	0	0		0
47	John Grahame	G	19	0	1	1		6	—	—	—	—	—	—
36	Ivan Huml	LW	1	0	1	1	2	0	—	—	—	—	—	—
33	Jeff Norton†	D	3	0	1	1	0	2	3	0	0	0	1	5
22	Mikko Eloranta‡	LW	6	0	0	0	−1	2	—	—	—	—	—	—
43	Ric Jackman	D	2	0	0	0	−1	2	—	—	—	—	—	—
48	Chris Kelleher	D	1	0	0	0	0	0	—	—	—	—	—	—
72	Pavel Kolarik	D	13	0	0	0	0	6	—	—	—	—	—	—
57	Eric Manlow	C	3	0	0	0	0	0	—	—	—	—	—	—
1	Andrew Raycroft	G	1	0	0	0		0	—	—	—	—	—	—
46	Tony Tuzzolino	RW	2	0	0	0	−1	0	—	—	—	—	—	—

=== Goaltending ===
No.	Player	Regular season										Playoffs								
No.	Player	GP	W	L	T	SA	GA	GAA	SV%	SO	TOI	GP	W	L	SA	GA	GAA	SV%	SO	TOI
34	Byron Dafoe	64	35	26	3	1520	141	2.21	.907	4	3827	6	2	4	141	19	3.18	.865	0	358
47	John Grahame	19	8	7	2	503	52	2.89	.897	1	1079	—	—	—	—	—	—	—	—	—
1	Andrew Raycroft	1	0	0	1	29	3	2.77	.897	0	65	—	—	—	—	—	—	—	—	—

== Awards and records ==
=== Awards ===
Type	Award/honor	Recipient	Ref
League (annual)	NHL All-Rookie Team	Nick Boynton (Defense)	
League (annual)	NHL Second All-Star Team	Bill Guerin (Right wing)	
League (in-season)	NHL All-Star Game selection	Robbie Ftorek (coach)	
League (in-season)	NHL All-Star Game selection	Joe Thornton	
League (in-season)	NHL Player of the Week	Glen Murray (January 2)	
League (in-season)	NHL YoungStars Game selection	Nick Boynton	
Team	Elizabeth C. Dufresne Trophy	Brian Rolston	
Team	John P. Bucyk Award	Hal Gill	
Team	Seventh Player Award	Bill Guerin	
Team	Three Stars Awards	Byron Dafoe (1st)	
Team	Three Stars Awards	Brian Rolston (2nd)	
Team	Three Stars Awards	Joe Thornton (3rd)	

=== Milestones ===
Milestone	Player	Date	Ref
First game	Ivan Huml	December 4, 2001	
First game	Andy Hilbert	December 20, 2001	
First game	Chris Kelleher	March 16, 2002	
25th shutout	Byron Dafoe	December 20, 2001	

== Transactions ==
The Bruins were involved in the following transactions from June 10, 2001, the day after the deciding game of the 2001 Stanley Cup Final, through June 13, 2002, the day of the deciding game of the 2002 Stanley Cup Final.

=== Trades ===
Date	Details		Ref
June 24, 2001	To Boston Bruins: Ric Jackman	To Dallas Stars: Cameron Mann	
October 24, 2001	To Boston Bruins: Glen Murray; Jozef Stumpel	To Los Angeles Kings: Jason Allison; Mikko Eloranta	
January 12, 2002	To Boston Bruins: Benoit Hogue	To Dallas Stars: Future considerations	
January 25, 2002	To Boston Bruins: 5th-round pick in 2002	To Phoenix Coyotes: Andrei Nazarov	
March 5, 2002	To Boston Bruins: Marty McInnis	To Anaheim Mighty Ducks: 3rd-round pick in 2002	
March 19, 2002	To Boston Bruins: Sean Brown	To Edmonton Oilers: Bobby Allen	
March 19, 2002	To Boston Bruins: Darryl Laplante	To Minnesota Wild: Greg Crozier	
March 19, 2002	To Boston Bruins: Jeff Norton	To Florida Panthers: 6th-round pick in 2002	
May 13, 2002	To Boston Bruins: Rights to Kris Vernarsky	To Toronto Maple Leafs: Ric Jackman	

=== Players acquired ===
Date	Player	Former team	Term	Via	Ref
July 2, 2001	Martin Lapointe	Detroit Red Wings	4-year	Free agency	
July 2, 2001	Sean O'Donnell	New Jersey Devils	3-year	Free agency	
July 6, 2001	Rob Zamuner	Ottawa Senators	3-year	Free agency	
July 23, 2001	Chris Kelleher	Pittsburgh Penguins	2-year	Free agency	
July 23, 2001	Jeff Maund	Chicago Blackhawks	1-year (Note: Option for a second year.)	Free agency	
July 23, 2001	Tony Tuzzolino	New York Rangers	1-year	Free agency	
July 26, 2001	Scott Pellerin	Carolina Hurricanes	2-year	Free agency	
July 27, 2001	Greg Crozier	Pittsburgh Penguins	2-year	Free agency	
July 27, 2001	Mike Gellard	St. Lawrence University (ECAC)	2-year	Free agency	
August 8, 2001	Carl Corazzini	Boston University (HE)	2-year	Free agency	
August 8, 2001	John Emmons	Tampa Bay Lightning	1-year	Free agency	
September 19, 2001	Colton Orr	Kamloops Blazers (WHL)	3-year	Free agency	
September 28, 2001	P. J. Stock	New York Rangers		Waiver draft	
October 5, 2001	Dennis Bonvie	Pittsburgh Penguins		Free agency	
October 13, 2001	Jamie Rivers	Ottawa Senators		Waivers	
January 29, 2002	Gord Murphy	Atlanta Thrashers	1-year	Free agency	
June 6, 2002	Peter Metcalf	University of Maine (HE)	2-year	Free agency	

=== Players lost ===
Date	Player	New team	Via (Note: In parentheses is the player's free agency group on July 1 if applicable.)	Ref
N/A	Elias Abrahamsson	Hamilton Bulldogs (AHL)	Free agency (UFA)	
N/A	Marquis Mathieu	Saint-Georges Garaga (QSPHL)	Free agency (VI)	
N/A	Keith McCambridge	Providence Bruins (AHL)	Free agency (VI)	
June 28, 2001	Peter Popovic	Sodertalje SK (SHL)	Free agency (III)	
July 2, 2001	Ken Belanger	Los Angeles Kings	Free agency (UFA)	
July 5, 2001	Eric Weinrich	Philadelphia Flyers	Free agency (III)	
July 6, 2001	Shawn Bates	New York Islanders	Free agency (UFA)	
July 9, 2001	Kay Whitmore	Calgary Flames	Free agency (III)	
July 18, 2001	Andrei Kovalenko	Lokomotiv Yaroslavl (RSL)	Free agency (III)	
July 23, 2001	Brandon Smith	San Jose Sharks	Free agency (VI)	
August 1, 2001	Peter Ferraro	Washington Capitals	Free agency (UFA)	
August 2, 2001	Andre Savage	Vancouver Canucks	Free agency (VI)	
August 3, 2001	Joel Trottier	Columbia Inferno (ECHL)	Free agency (UFA)	
August 7, 2001	Darren Van Impe	New York Rangers	Waivers	
September 2001	Shane Belter	Atlantic City Boardwalk Bullies (ECHL)	Free agency (UFA)	
October 2001	Joe Hulbig	Providence Bruins (AHL)	Free agency (VI)	
October 2001	Peter Skudra	Hartford Wolf Pack (AHL)	Free agency (UFA)	
October 11, 2001	Eric Nickulas	Worcester IceCats (AHL)	Free agency (VI)	
November 14, 2001	Dixon Ward	SCL Tigers (NLA)	Free agency (III)	
January 12, 2002	Scott Pellerin	Dallas Stars	Waivers	
March 19, 2002	Benoit Hogue	Washington Capitals	Waivers	
March 19, 2002	Gord Murphy		Retirement	

=== Signings ===
Date	Player	Term	Contract type	Ref
July 10, 2001	Andy Hilbert	3-year	Entry-level	
July 17, 2001	Bobby Allen	2-year	Entry-level	
July 19, 2001	Ric Jackman	1-year	Re-signing	
July 20, 2001	Hal Gill	2-year	Re-signing	
July 25, 2001	P. J. Axelsson	1-year	Re-signing	
July 25, 2001	Mike Knuble	1-year	Re-signing	
August 1, 2001	Jay Henderson	1-year	Re-signing	
August 1, 2001	Kyle McLaren	1-year	Re-signing	
August 8, 2001	Bill Guerin	1-year	Arbitration award	
August 11, 2001	Brian Rolston	2-year	Re-signing	
August 29, 2001	Mikko Eloranta	1-year	Re-signing	
August 29, 2001	Jarno Kultanen	2-year	Re-signing	
May 13, 2002	Kris Vernarsky	3-year	Entry-level	

== Draft picks ==
Boston's draft picks at the 2001 NHL entry draft held at the National Car Rental Center in Sunrise, Florida.

Round	#	Player	Nationality	College/Junior/Club team (League)
1	19	Shaone Morrisonn	Canada	Kamloops Blazers (WHL)
3	77	Darren McLachlan	Canada	Seattle Thunderbirds (WHL)
4	111	Matti Kaltiainen	Finland	Espoo Blues (Finland)
5	147	Jiri Jakes	Czech Republic	Brandon Wheat Kings (WHL)
6	179	Andrew Alberts	United States	Waterloo Blackhawks (USHL)
7	209	Jordan Sigalet	Canada	Victoria Grizzlies (BCJHL)
8	241	Milan Jurcina	Slovakia	Halifax Mooseheads (QMJHL)
9	282	Marcel Rodman	Slovenia	Peterborough Petes (OHL)

== See also ==
- 2001–02 NHL season
