= 2001–02 Philadelphia Flyers season =

NHL hockey team season

2001–02 Philadelphia Flyers
- Atlantic Division champions
- Division: 1st Atlantic
- Conference: 2nd Eastern
- 2001–02 record: 42–27–10–3
- Home record: 20–13–5–3
- Road record: 22–14–5–0
- Goals for: 234
- Goals against: 192

Team information
- General manager: Bob Clarke
- Coach: Bill Barber
- Captain: Eric Desjardins (Oct.); Keith Primeau (Oct.–Apr.)
- Alternate captains: John LeClair; Mark Recchi
- Arena: First Union Center
- Average attendance: 19,569
- Minor league affiliates: Philadelphia Phantoms; Trenton Titans

Team leaders
- Goals: Simon Gagne (33)
- Assists: Jeremy Roenick (46)
- Points: Jeremy Roenick (67)
- Penalty minutes: Todd Fedoruk (141)
- Plus/minus: Jeremy Roenick (+32)
- Wins: Roman Cechmanek (24)
- Goals against average: Roman Cechmanek (2.05)

The 2001–02 Philadelphia Flyers season was the franchise's 35th season in the National Hockey League (NHL). The Flyers qualified for the playoffs, but lost in the first round.

== Off-season ==
In the off-season, the Flyers re-vamped their lineup by signing star center Jeremy Roenick and veteran defenseman Eric Weinrich. On August 20, 2001, they finally traded Eric Lindros to the New York Rangers for Kim Johnsson, Jan Hlavac, Pavel Brendl and a 2003 third-round draft pick. The Rangers would also receive a 2003 first-round draft pick if Lindros suffered a concussion in the pre-season or the first 50 games of the regular season and didn't return to action for at least 12 months.

== Pre-season ==
On September 20, 2001, in the middle of a 2–2 game between the Flyers and New York Rangers, the game was stopped. A message from United States President George W. Bush about the 9/11 attacks was broadcast on the arena video screen. After the message, the game did not resume and it was declared a 2–2 tie at the end of the 2nd period. Both teams took place in a handshake line following the game, a tradition normally reserved for the end of an elimination game in a Stanley Cup Playoff series.

== Regular season ==
The Flyers began 2001–02 with high expectations and with Roenick leading the team in scoring the Flyers finished with an Atlantic Division title.

Eric Desjardins stepped down as team captain eight games into the season and was replaced by Keith Primeau.

Lindros returned to Philly on January 12, a game which the Flyers took 4–2 in a brutal battle and saw Lindros held scoreless. Lindros did exact a measure of revenge, finishing off a hat trick within the first 22 minutes of a March 2 game at Madison Square Garden. Simon Gagne also scored three times but the Rangers held on for a 6–5 win.

The power play was one of the NHL's worst however and after their top two centermen, Jeremy Roenick and Primeau, suffered injuries the night before the trade deadline, the Flyers acquired Adam Oates from the Washington Capitals. While Oates was the third leading point-producer in the league at the time, the price to acquire him was high. The Flyers parted with top goalie prospect Maxime Ouellet and their first, second, and third-round draft picks in the 2002 NHL entry draft.

=== Season standings ===
Atlantic Division
No.	CR		GP	W	L	T	OTL	GF	GA	Pts
1	2	**Philadelphia Flyers**	82	42	27	10	3	234	192	97
2	5	**New York Islanders**	82	42	28	8	4	239	220	96
3	6	**New Jersey Devils**	82	41	28	9	4	205	187	95
4	11	New York Rangers	82	36	38	4	4	227	258	80
5	12	Pittsburgh Penguins	82	28	41	8	5	198	249	69

Note: CR = Conference rank; GP = Games played; W = Wins; L = Losses; T = Ties; OTL = Overtime loss; GF = Goals for; GA = Goals against; Pts = Points
Bolded teams qualified for the playoffs.

Eastern Conference
R		Div	GP	W	L	T	OTL	GF	GA	Pts
**1**	**Z-** Boston Bruins	**NE**	**82**	**43**	**24**	**6**	**9**	**236**	**201**	101
**2**	**Y-** Philadelphia Flyers	**AT**	**82**	**42**	**27**	**10**	**3**	**234**	**192**	97
**3**	**Y-** Carolina Hurricanes	**SE**	**82**	**35**	**26**	**16**	**5**	**217**	**217**	91
**4**	**X-** Toronto Maple Leafs	**NE**	**82**	**43**	**25**	**10**	**4**	**249**	**207**	100
**5**	**X-** New York Islanders	**AT**	**82**	**42**	**28**	**8**	**4**	**239**	**220**	96
**6**	**X-** New Jersey Devils	**AT**	**82**	**41**	**28**	**9**	**4**	**205**	**187**	95
**7**	**X-** Ottawa Senators	**NE**	**82**	**39**	**27**	**9**	**7**	**243**	**208**	94
**8**	**X-** Montreal Canadiens	**NE**	**82**	**36**	**31**	**12**	**3**	**207**	**209**	87
8.5
9	Washington Capitals	SE	82	36	33	11	2	228	240	85
10	Buffalo Sabres	NE	82	35	35	11	1	213	200	82
11	New York Rangers	AT	82	36	38	4	4	227	258	80
12	Pittsburgh Penguins	AT	82	28	41	8	5	198	249	69
13	Tampa Bay Lightning	SE	82	27	40	11	4	178	219	69
14	Florida Panthers	SE	82	22	44	10	6	180	250	60
15	Atlanta Thrashers	SE	82	19	47	11	5	187	288	54

Divisions: AT – Atlantic, NE – Northeast, SE – Southeast

Z – Clinched conference; Y – Clinched division; X – Clinched playoff spot

== Playoffs ==
The Flyers set a record for fewest goals scored by a team in a five-game playoff series, scoring only two goals against the Ottawa Senators.

It turned out there was much discontent in the locker room, resulting in Bill Barber and his coaching staff being fired.

== Schedule and results ==
=== Preseason ===
2001 preseason
Preseason: 4–1–3 (home: 2–0–3; road: 2–1–0)

Game	Date	Score	Opponent	Record	Recap
–^{[a]}	September 15		@ Washington Capitals		
1	September 18	6–1	@ Washington Capitals	1–0–0	W
2	September 20	2–2^{[b]}	New York Rangers	1–0–1	T
3^{[c]}	September 21	5–5 OT	New York Islanders	1–0–2	T
4	September 22	2–2 OT	New Jersey Devils	1–0–3	T
5	September 23	1–2	@ New York Rangers	1–1–3	L
6	September 25	6–4	Washington Capitals	2–1–3	W
7	September 28	5–2	New York Islanders	3–1–3	W
8	September 29	5–4	@ New Jersey Devils	4–1–3	W
Notes:^{a} Game rescheduled to September 18 due to the September 11 attacks.^{b} Game declared a tie after two periods after President George W. Bush's speech regarding the September 11 attacks was shown in the arena during the second intermission.^{c} Game played at Sovereign Bank Arena in Trenton, New Jersey.

Legend: W Win (2 points) L Loss (0 points) T Tie (1 point) OTL Overtime loss (1 point)

=== Regular season ===
2001–02 regular season
October: 6–3–3–0, 15 points (home: 3–1–1–0; road: 3–2–2–0)

Game	Date	Score	Opponent	Decision	Record	Points	Recap
1	October 4	5–2	Florida Panthers	Cechmanek	1–0–0–0	2	W
2	October 6	3–3 OT	Columbus Blue Jackets	Cechmanek	1–0–1–0	3	T
3	October 8	2–2 OT	@ Columbus Blue Jackets	Boucher	1–0–2–0	4	T
4	October 10	1–2	@ Buffalo Sabres	Boucher	1–1–2–0	4	L
5	October 13	5–2	@ Florida Panthers	Cechmanek	2–1–2–0	6	W
6	October 16	3–3 OT	@ Atlanta Thrashers	Cechmanek	2–1–3–0	7	T
7	October 18	2–3	@ Detroit Red Wings	Boucher	2–2–3–0	7	L
8	October 20	6–3	Washington Capitals	Cechmanek	3–2–3–0	9	W
9	October 25	2–7	Ottawa Senators	Cechmanek	3–3–3–0	9	L
10	October 27	5–1	@ Montreal Canadiens	Boucher	4–3–3–0	11	W
11	October 30	3–0	@ Washington Capitals	Boucher	5–3–3–0	13	W
12	October 31	3–0	Pittsburgh Penguins	Boucher	6–3–3–0	15	W

November: 4–4–2–1, 11 points (home: 1–2–1–1; road: 3–2–1–0)

Game	Date	Score	Opponent	Decision	Record	Points	Recap
13	November 3	1–2	New York Islanders	Boucher	6–4–3–0	15	L
14	November 6	1–2	@ Chicago Blackhawks	Cechmanek	6–5–3–0	15	L
15	November 8	2–1	@ Tampa Bay Lightning	Boucher	7–5–3–0	17	W
16	November 10	3–2 OT	@ Florida Panthers	Boucher	8–5–3–0	19	W
17	November 14	2–4	@ New York Rangers	Cechmanek	8–6–3–0	19	L
18	November 15	5–0	Washington Capitals	Boucher	9–6–3–0	21	W
19	November 17	3–1	@ New Jersey Devils	Cechmanek	10–6–3–0	23	W
20	November 20	3–3 OT	New Jersey Devils	Cechmanek	10–6–4–0	24	T
21	November 23	3–3 OT	@ Dallas Stars	Cechmanek	10–6–5–0	25	T
22	November 25	1–4	Vancouver Canucks	Cechmanek	10–7–5–0	25	L
23	November 29	2–3 OT	Boston Bruins	Cechmanek	10–7–5–1	26	OTL

December: 11–4–0–0, 22 points (home: 5–2–0–0; road: 6–2–0–0)

Game	Date	Score	Opponent	Decision	Record	Points	Recap
24	December 1	2–0	Tampa Bay Lightning	Cechmanek	11–7–5–1	28	W
25	December 4	3–2	@ New York Islanders	Cechmanek	12–7–5–1	30	W
26	December 6	0–2	New York Islanders	Cechmanek	12–8–5–1	30	L
27	December 8	5–1	Minnesota Wild	Cechmanek	13–8–5–1	32	W
28	December 10	3–1	@ Atlanta Thrashers	Cechmanek	14–8–5–1	34	W
29	December 13	2–3	Montreal Canadiens	Cechmanek	14–9–5–1	34	L
30	December 15	5–2	@ Boston Bruins	Boucher	15–9–5–1	36	W
31	December 16	2–3	Edmonton Oilers	Boucher	15–10–5–1	36	L
32	December 18	6–3	St. Louis Blues	Cechmanek	16–10–5–1	38	W
33	December 20	2–1	Dallas Stars	Boucher	17–10–5–1	40	W
34	December 22	4–3 OT	Carolina Hurricanes	Boucher	18–10–5–1	42	W
35	December 26	4–1	@ Washington Capitals	Cechmanek	19–10–5–1	44	W
36	December 28	2–4	@ Phoenix Coyotes	Boucher	19–11–5–1	44	L
37	December 29	5–2	@ Colorado Avalanche	Cechmanek	20–11–5–1	46	W
38	December 31	2–1	@ Vancouver Canucks	Cechmanek	21–11–5–1	48	W

January: 10–3–1–1, 22 points (home: 6–0–1–1; road: 4–3–0–0)

Game	Date	Score	Opponent	Decision	Record	Points	Recap
39	January 2	2–5	@ San Jose Sharks	Cechmanek	21–12–5–1	48	L
40	January 6	4–3	@ Carolina Hurricanes	Boucher	22–12–5–1	50	W
41	January 8	7–4	Atlanta Thrashers	Boucher	23–12–5–1	52	W
42	January 10	3–2	New Jersey Devils	Cechmanek	24–12–5–1	54	W
43	January 12	4–2	New York Rangers	Cechmanek	25–12–5–1	56	W
44	January 14	5–3	@ Montreal Canadiens	Cechmanek	26–12–5–1	58	W
45	January 15	4–1	@ Ottawa Senators	Cechmanek	27–12–5–1	60	W
46	January 17	6–3	Atlanta Thrashers	Cechmanek	28–12–5–1	62	W
47	January 19	3–0	@ Toronto Maple Leafs	Cechmanek	29–12–5–1	64	W
48	January 21	2–5	@ Pittsburgh Penguins	Boucher	29–13–5–1	64	L
49	January 22	1–1 OT	Ottawa Senators	Cechmanek	29–13–6–1	65	T
50	January 24	2–3 OT	Nashville Predators	Cechmanek	29–13–6–2	66	OTL
51	January 26	4–2	Carolina Hurricanes	Boucher	30–13–6–2	68	W
52	January 29	3–2 OT	Pittsburgh Penguins	Boucher	31–13–6–2	70	W
53	January 30	1–3	@ Ottawa Senators	Boucher	31–14–6–2	70	L

February: 4–1–0–1, 9 points (home: 1–0–0–1; road: 3–1–0–0)

Game	Date	Score	Opponent	Decision	Record	Points	Recap
54	February 4	3–1	@ Los Angeles Kings	Cechmanek	32–14–6–2	72	W
55	February 6	4–5	@ Mighty Ducks of Anaheim	Boucher	32–15–6–2	72	L
56	February 9	5–0	@ St. Louis Blues	Cechmanek	33–15–6–2	74	W
57	February 12	0–1 OT	New York Islanders	Cechmanek	33–15–6–3	75	OTL
58	February 26	5–4	Chicago Blackhawks	Cechmanek	34–15–6–3	77	W
59	February 27	1–0	@ New Jersey Devils	Cechmanek	35–15–6–3	79	W

March: 5–7–3–0, 13 points (home: 2–5–1–0; road: 3–2–2–0)

Game	Date	Score	Opponent	Decision	Record	Points	Recap
60	March 2	5–6	@ New York Rangers	Boucher	35–16–6–3	79	L
61	March 4	4–1	@ Boston Bruins	Boucher	36–17–6–3	81	W
62	March 7	2–4	Calgary Flames	Boucher	36–18–6–3	81	L
63	March 8	4–2	@ Tampa Bay Lightning	Boucher	37–18–6–3	83	W
64	March 10	1–3	Toronto Maple Leafs	Boucher	37–19–6–3	83	L
65	March 12	1–1 OT	@ Toronto Maple Leafs	Boucher	37–18–7–3	84	T
66	March 14	1–3	Buffalo Sabres	Boucher	37–19–7–3	84	L
67	March 16	1–2	Colorado Avalanche	Boucher	37–20–7–3	84	L
68	March 18	3–3 OT	Tampa Bay Lightning	Boucher	37–20–8–3	85	T
69	March 21	2–1	Mighty Ducks of Anaheim	Boucher	38–20–8–3	87	W
70	March 23	4–4 OT	@ Pittsburgh Penguins	Boucher	38–20–9–3	88	T
71	March 25	4–1	Toronto Maple Leafs	Boucher	39–20–9–3	90	W
72	March 27	4–2	@ New York Rangers	Boucher	40–20–9–3	92	W
73	March 28	1–4	@ Carolina Hurricanes	Little	40–21–9–3	92	L
74	March 30	1–3	Buffalo Sabres	Boucher	40–22–9–3	92	L

April: 2–5–1–0, 5 points (home: 2–2–1–0; road: 0–3–0–0)

Game	Date	Score	Opponent	Decision	Record	Points	Recap
75	April 1	1–3	@ Buffalo Sabres	Cechmanek	40–23–9–3	92	L
76	April 2	2–4	Boston Bruins	Boucher	40–24–9–3	92	L
77	April 4	1–3	Montreal Canadiens	Cechmanek	40–25–9–3	92	L
78	April 6	3–1	Pittsburgh Penguins	Cechmanek	41–25–9–3	94	W
79	April 8	4–4 OT	Florida Panthers	Cechmanek	41–25–10–3	95	T
80	April 10	0–1	@ New Jersey Devils	Cechmanek	41–26–10–3	95	L
81	April 13	2–1	New York Rangers	Cechmanek	42–26–10–3	97	W
82	April 14	1–3	@ New York Islanders	Boucher	42–27–10–3	97	L

Legend: W Win (2 points) L Loss (0 points) T Tie (1 point) OTL Overtime loss (1 point)

=== Playoffs ===
2002 Stanley Cup playoffs
Eastern Conference quarterfinals vs. Ottawa Senators – Senators win 4–1

Game	Date	Score	Opponent	Decision	Series	Recap
1	April 17	1–0 OT	Ottawa Senators	Cechmanek	Flyers lead 1–0	W
2	April 20	0–3	Ottawa Senators	Cechmanek	Series tied 1–1	L
3	April 22	0–3	@ Ottawa Senators	Cechmanek	Senators lead 2–1	L
4	April 24	0–3	@ Ottawa Senators	Cechmanek	Senators lead 3–1	L
5	April 26	1–2 OT	Ottawa Senators	Boucher	Senators win 4–1	L

Legend: W Win L Loss

== Player statistics ==
=== Scoring ===
- Position abbreviations: C = Center; D = Defense; G = Goaltender; LW = Left wing; RW = Right wing
- † = Joined team via a transaction (e.g., trade, waivers, signing) during the season. Stats reflect time with the Flyers only.
- ‡ = Left team via a transaction (e.g., trade, waivers, release) during the season. Stats reflect time with the Flyers only.

No.	Player	Pos	Regular season						Playoffs					
No.	Player	Pos	GP	G	A	Pts	+/-	PIM	GP	G	A	Pts	+/-	PIM
97	Jeremy Roenick	C	75	21	46	67	32	74	5	0	0	0	−3	14
12	Simon Gagne	LW	79	33	33	66	31	32	5	0	0	0	−3	2
8	Mark Recchi	RW	80	22	42	64	5	46	4	0	0	0	−1	2
10	John LeClair	LW	82	25	26	51	5	30	5	0	0	0	−2	2
25	Keith Primeau	C	75	19	29	48	−3	128	5	0	0	0	−3	6
5	Kim Johnsson	D	82	11	30	41	12	42	5	0	0	0	−2	2
14	Justin Williams	RW	75	17	23	40	11	32	5	0	0	0	−3	4
39	Marty Murray	C	74	12	15	27	10	10	5	0	1	1	−2	0
20	Jiri Dopita	C	52	11	16	27	9	8	—	—	—	—	—	—
37	Eric Desjardins	D	65	6	19	25	−1	24	5	0	1	1	−3	2
26	Ruslan Fedotenko	RW	65	6	19	25	15	24	5	1	0	1	0	2
2	Eric Weinrich	D	80	4	20	24	27	26	5	0	0	0	0	4
3	Dan McGillis	D	75	5	14	19	17	46	5	1	0	1	−1	8
87	Donald Brashear†	LW	50	4	15	19	0	109	5	0	0	0	−1	19
6	Chris Therien	D	77	4	10	14	16	30	5	0	0	0	−3	2
27	Jan Hlavac‡	LW	31	7	3	10	5	8	—	—	—	—	—	—
77	Adam Oates†	C	14	3	7	10	−2	6	5	0	2	2	−1	0
19	Paul Ranheim	RW	79	5	4	9	5	36	5	0	0	0	−2	0
22	Luke Richardson	D	72	1	8	9	18	102	5	0	0	0	−1	4
29	Todd Fedoruk	LW	55	3	4	7	−2	141	3	0	0	0	0	0
28	Kent Manderville‡	C	34	2	5	7	2	8	—	—	—	—	—	—
24	Chris McAllister	D	42	0	5	5	−7	113	—	—	—	—	—	—
92	Rick Tocchet	RW	14	0	2	2	−2	28	—	—	—	—	—	—
55	Pavel Brendl	RW	8	1	0	1	−1	2	2	0	0	0	0	0
18	Tomas Divisek	C	3	1	0	1	1	0	—	—	—	—	—	—
17	Billy Tibbetts†‡	RW	9	0	1	1	−3	69	—	—	—	—	—	—
33	Brian Boucher	G	41	0	0	0		4	2	0	0	0		0
21	Jesse Boulerice‡	RW	3	0	0	0	−1	5	—	—	—	—	—	—
32	Roman Cechmanek	G	46	0	0	0		10	4	0	0	0		0
23	Guillaume Lefebvre	LW	3	0	0	0	−1	0	—	—	—	—	—	—
35	Neil Little	G	1	0	0	0		10	—	—	—	—	—	—
11	Vaclav Pletka	LW	1	0	0	0	0	0	—	—	—	—	—	—
15	Jarrod Skalde†	C	1	0	0	0	0	2	—	—	—	—	—	—
15	John Slaney	D	1	0	0	0	2	0	1	0	0	0	−1	0
42	Bruno St. Jacques	D	7	0	0	0	4	2	—	—	—	—	—	—

=== Goaltending ===
No.	Player	Regular season											Playoffs									
No.	Player	GP	GS	W	L	T	SA	GA	GAA	SV%	SO	TOI	GP	GS	W	L	SA	GA	GAA	SV%	SO	TOI
32	Roman Cechmanek	46	43	24	13	6	1131	89	2.05	.921	4	2,603	4	4	1	3	109	7	1.85	.936	1	227
33	Brian Boucher	41	38	18	16	4	972	92	2.41	.905	2	2,295	2	1	0	1	33	2	1.37	.939	0	88
35	Neil Little	1	1	0	1	0	29	4	4.00	.862	0	60	—	—	—	—	—	—	—	—	—	—

== Awards and records ==
=== Awards ===
Type	Award/honor	Recipient	Ref
League (in-season)	NHL All-Star Game selection	Jeremy Roenick	
League (in-season)	NHL Player of the Week	Brian Boucher (November 5)	
League (in-season)	NHL Player of the Week	Roman Cechmanek (January 21)	
League (in-season)	NHL YoungStars Game selection	Justin Williams	
Team	Barry Ashbee Trophy	Kim Johnsson	
Team	Bobby Clarke Trophy	Jeremy Roenick	
Team	Pelle Lindbergh Memorial Trophy	Justin Williams	
Team	Toyota Cup	Simon Gagne	
Team	Yanick Dupre Memorial Class Guy Award	Jeremy Roenick	

=== Records ===
Among the team records set during the 2001–02 season was Jiri Dopita scoring four goals against the Atlanta Thrashers on January 8, tying the team record for most goals in a single game. The Flyers recorded three overtime losses for the third consecutive season, tying the franchise mark for fewest. The 40 powerplay goals allowed by the Flyers is also the franchise record for fewest in a season. The two goals the Flyers scored during their conference quarterfinals series against the Ottawa Senators is both the fewest in a playoff year and series in franchise history, and is also the NHL record for fewest goals scored in a five-game playoff series.

=== Milestones ===
Milestone	Player	Date	Ref
First game	Pavel Brendl	October 4, 2001	
First game	Jiri Dopita	October 4, 2001	
First game	Jesse Boulerice	October 6, 2001	
First game	Vaclav Pletka	October 20, 2001	
First game	Bruno St. Jacques	October 31, 2001	
First game	Neil Little	March 28, 2002	
First game	Guillaume Lefebvre	March 30, 2002	
400th goal	Mark Recchi	December 18, 2001	
1,000th point	Jeremy Roenick	January 30, 2002	
1,000th game played	Mark Recchi	March 23, 2002	

== Transactions ==
The Flyers were involved in the following transactions from June 10, 2001, the day after the deciding game of the 2001 Stanley Cup Final, through June 13, 2002, the day of the deciding game of the 2002 Stanley Cup Final.

=== Trades ===
Date	Details		Ref
June 23, 2001	To Philadelphia Flyers: Rights to Jiri Dopita	To Florida Panthers: 2nd-round pick in 2001	
June 23, 2001	To Philadelphia Flyers: 1st-round pick in 2001; 7th-round pick in 2001; Tampa Bay's 2nd-round pick in 2002	To Ottawa Senators: 1st-round pick in 2001	
June 24, 2001	To Philadelphia Flyers: 4th-round pick in 2001; 5th-round pick in 2001; 7th-round pick in 2001	To Nashville Predators: NY Islanders' 4th-round pick in 2001	
June 24, 2001	To Philadelphia Flyers: 3rd-round pick in 2002	To Carolina Hurricanes: Nashville's 4th-round pick in 2001	
June 24, 2001	To Philadelphia Flyers: 3rd-round pick in 2002	To Tampa Bay Lightning: 4th-round pick in 2001; 5th-round pick in 2001; 7th-round pick in 2001	
June 24, 2001	To Philadelphia Flyers: 7th-round pick in 2002	To Tampa Bay Lightning: 8th-round pick in 2001; 9th-round pick in 2002	
June 24, 2001	To Philadelphia Flyers: 4th-round pick in 2002	To Calgary Flames: Dean McAmmond	
July 2, 2001	To Philadelphia Flyers: Choice of 1st and 2nd-round picks (Note: The Flyers had the option of receiving either the St. Louis Blues first-round pick in 2002 and a second-round pick in 2003, or a second-round pick in 2002 and a first-round pick in 2003. The Flyers chose the 2002 second-round pick and 2003 first-round pick.)	To Phoenix Coyotes: Daymond Langkow	
July 31, 2001	To Philadelphia Flyers: 3rd-round pick in 2002	To Nashville Predators: Andy Delmore	
August 20, 2001	To Philadelphia Flyers: Pavel Brendl; Jan Hlavac; Kim Johnsson; 3rd-round pick in 2003	To New York Rangers: Rights to Eric Lindros; Conditional 1st-round pick in 2003 (Note: Condition not met. The Rangers would have received a 2003 first-round draft pick if Lindros suffered a concussion in the pre-season or the first fifty games of the regular season and didn't return to action for at least twelve months.)	
December 17, 2001	To Philadelphia Flyers: Donald Brashear; 6th-round pick in 2002	To Vancouver Canucks: Jan Hlavac; Tampa Bay's 3rd-round pick in 2002	
January 11, 2002	To Philadelphia Flyers: Yves Sarault; Conditional draft pick in 2003 (Note: Condition not met. The Flyers would have received the draft pick if either Beckett or Hubacek played in the NHL for the Predators during the 2001–02 or 2002–03 season.)	To Nashville Predators: Jason Beckett; Petr Hubacek	
February 13, 2002	To Philadelphia Flyers: Greg Koehler	To Carolina Hurricanes: Jesse Boulerice	
March 5, 2002	To Philadelphia Flyers: Jarrod Skalde	To Atlanta Thrashers: Joe DiPenta	
March 15, 2002	To Philadelphia Flyers: David Harlock; 3rd-round pick in 2003; 7th-round pick in 2003	To Atlanta Thrashers: Francis Lessard	
March 17, 2002	To Philadelphia Flyers: Billy Tibbetts	To Pittsburgh Penguins: Kent Manderville	
March 19, 2002	To Philadelphia Flyers: Adam Oates	To Washington Capitals: Maxime Ouellet; 1st-round pick in 2002; 2nd-round pick in 2002; 3rd-round pick in 2002	
June 12, 2002	To Philadelphia Flyers: Robert Esche; Michal Handzus	To Phoenix Coyotes: Brian Boucher; Nashville's 3rd-round pick in 2002	

=== Players acquired ===
Date	Player	Former team	Term	Via	Ref
June 11, 2001	Mike Lephart	Boston College (HE)	1-year	Free agency	
June 14, 2001	James Chalmers	University of Nebraska Omaha (CCHA)	1-year	Free agency	
July 2, 2001	Jeremy Roenick	Phoenix Coyotes	5-year	Free agency	
July 5, 2001	Eric Weinrich	Boston Bruins	3-year	Free agency	
July 6, 2001	Pete Vandermeer	Providence Bruins (AHL)		Free agency	
July 9, 2001	Marty Murray	Calgary Flames	1-year	Free agency	
May 20, 2002	Wade Skolney	Brandon Wheat Kings (WHL)	3-year	Free agency	

=== Players lost ===
Date	Player	New team	Via (Note: In parentheses is the player's free agency group on July 1 if applicable.)	Ref
July 16, 2001	Steve McLaren	St. Louis Blues	Free agency (VI)	
August 6, 2001	Derek Plante	Munich Barons (DEL)	Free agency (UFA)	
August 21, 2001	Matt Herr	Florida Panthers	Free agency (VI)	
August 23, 2001	P. J. Stock	New York Rangers	Free agency (UFA)	
September 10, 2001	Peter White	Chicago Blackhawks	Free agency (UFA)	
September 19, 2001	Brian Regan	Missouri River Otters (UHL)	Free agency (UFA)	
N/A	Steve Washburn	Iserlohn Roosters (DEL)	Free agency (UFA)	
January 24, 2002	Jody Hull	Ottawa Senators	Free agency (III)	
March 21, 2002	Jarrod Skalde	Lausanne HC (NLA)	Free agency (Note: Contract for the 2002–03 season. Skalde remained with Philadelphia through the end of the season.)	
April 8, 2002	Billy Tibbetts		Release	

=== Signings ===
Date	Player	Term	Contract type	Ref
June 14, 2001	John LeClair	5-year	Re-signing	
July 3, 2001	Jiri Dopita	2-year	Signing	
July 6, 2001	Dan McGillis	3-year	Re-signing	
August 27, 2001	Kim Johnsson	3-year	Re-signing	
September 4, 2001	Jan Hlavac	2-year	Re-signing	
January 10, 2002	Roman Cechmanek	3-year	Extension	
January 26, 2002	Marty Murray	3-year	Extension	
May 21, 2002	Patrick Sharp	3-year	Entry-level	
June 12, 2002	Antero Niittymaki	2-year	Entry-level	

== Draft picks ==
Philadelphia's picks at the 2001 NHL entry draft, which was held at the National Car Rental Center in Sunrise, Florida, on June 23–24, 2001. The Flyers traded eight of the nine draft picks originally allotted to them, retaining only their fifth-round pick, 158th overall, and trading the others in seven different trades.

Round	Pick	Player	Position	Nationality	Team (league)	Notes
1	27	Jeff Woywitka	Defense	Canada	Red Deer Rebels (WHL)	(Note: The Flyers traded their first-round pick, 23rd overall, to the Ottawa Senators for the Senators' first and seventh-round picks and the Tampa Bay Lightning's 2002 second-round pick on June 23, 2001.)
3	95	Patrick Sharp	Center	Canada	University of Vermont (Hockey East)	(Note: The Flyers acquired the Detroit Red Wings' third-round pick, 95th overall, from the Nashville Predators for Mark Eaton on September 29, 2000.)
5	146	Jussi Timonen	Defense	Finland	KalPa (SM-liiga)	(Note: The Flyers traded John Vanbiesbrouck to the New York Islanders for the Islanders' fourth-round pick, 95th overall, on June 25, 2000. That pick was traded to the Nashville Predators for the Predators' fourth, fifth, and seventh-round picks on June 23, 2001. The Predators fourth-round pick was traded to the Carolina Hurricanes for the Hurricanes' 2002 third-round pick on June 24, 2001.)
5	150	Bernd Bruckler	Goaltender	Austria	Tri-City Storm (USHL)	(Note: The Flyers received a fifth-round pick, 150th overall, as compensation for losing Valeri Zelepukin in free agency.)
5	158	Roman Malek	Goaltender	Czech Republic	Slavia Prague (CZE)	
6	172	Dennis Seidenberg	Defense	Germany	Adler Mannheim (DEL)	(Note: The Flyers traded Gino Odjick to the Montreal Canadiens for P. J. Stock and the Canadiens' sixth-round pick, 172nd overall, on December 7, 2000.)
6	177	Andrei Razin	Center	Russia	Metallurg Magnitogorsk (RUS)	(Note: The Flyers traded Marc Bureau to the Calgary Flames for Travis Brigley and the Flames' sixth-round pick, 177th overall, on March 6, 2000.)
7	208	Thierry Douville	Defense	Canada	Baie-Comeau Drakkar (QMJHL)	
7	225	David Printz	Defense	Sweden	Great Falls Americans (AWHL)	

== Farm teams ==
The Flyers were affiliated with the Philadelphia Phantoms of the AHL and the Trenton Titans of the ECHL.
