= 2001–02 Calgary Flames season =

NHL team season

2001–02 Calgary Flames
- Division: 4th Northwest
- Conference: 11th Western
- 2001–02 record: 32–35–12–3
- Home record: 20–14–5–2
- Road record: 12–21–7–1
- Goals for: 201
- Goals against: 220

Team information
- General manager: Craig Button
- Coach: Greg Gilbert
- Captain: Dave Lowry (Oct.–Feb.); Bob Boughner (Feb.–Apr.); Craig Conroy (Feb.–Apr.)
- Alternate captains: Jarome Iginla; Robyn Regehr
- Arena: Pengrowth Saddledome
- Average attendance: 15,705
- Minor league affiliates: Saint John Flames; Johnstown Chiefs

Team leaders
- Goals: Jarome Iginla (52)
- Assists: Craig Conroy (48)
- Points: Jarome Iginla (96)
- Penalty minutes: Bob Boughner (170)
- Plus/minus: Jarome Iginla (+27)
- Wins: Roman Turek (30)
- Goals against average: Roman Turek (2.53)

The 2001–02 Calgary Flames season was the 22nd season in Calgary. It began with wholesale changes, as second year General Manager Craig Button continued to change the look of the team. In two separate draft-day trades, the Flames dealt goaltender Fred Brathwaite and forwards Valeri Bure and Jason Wiemer away, gaining back Roman Turek and Rob Niedermayer.

The changes appeared to pay off, as the Flames stormed out to a 13–2–2–2 record, and first place in the division. The result prompted the Flames to sign Turek - a pending unrestricted free agent - to a long-term deal. The team, however, collapsed, winning only 19 of their remaining 63 games, finishing 4th in the Northwest Division, and out of the playoffs for the sixth consecutive season.

The season ended with head coach Greg Gilbert and top forward Marc Savard in a bitter, public feud that included the latter demanding a trade late in the season and into the summer.

Individually, Jarome Iginla broke into the spotlight, leading the NHL in goals (52) and points (96). His season would land him the Rocket Richard Trophy, the Art Ross Trophy and the Lester B. Pearson Award. Iginla also finished second in Hart Memorial Trophy voting, tied with winner Jose Theodore on points (434), but behind Theodore in first place votes (26–23).

Iginla was also a member of Canada's team at the 2002 Salt Lake Olympics. He recorded two goals in the gold medal game against the United States, which Canada won 5–2 to claim their first ice hockey gold medal in 50 years.

== Regular season ==
Bob Boughner and Craig Conroy were named co-captains of the team on February 4, replacing Dave Lowry.

The Flames were involved in a tragic incident during their March 16, 2002, game in Columbus against the Blue Jackets. During the second period of the contest, a slapshot by Columbus' Espen Knutsen was deflected into the crowd off the stick of Flames defenceman Derek Morris. The puck struck a fan, 13-year-old Brittanie Cecil, who was at her first NHL game. Though she was able to leave the game under her own power, the blow tore a vertebral artery and resulted in a blood clot. She died two days later; she was the first fan to die at a game in the NHL's 85-year history. Three months after the incident, the NHL instituted a policy requiring that protective netting be placed around the ends of each rink prior to the start of the 2002–03 season, a decision which both the Flames and Blue Jackets advocated.

The Flames finished 11th in the Western Conference, 15 points back of the 8th place Vancouver Canucks.

=== Final standings ===
Northwest Division
No.	CR		GP	W	L	T	OTL	GF	GA	Pts
1	2	**Colorado Avalanche**	82	45	28	8	1	212	169	99
2	8	**Vancouver Canucks**	82	42	30	7	3	254	211	94
3	9	Edmonton Oilers	82	38	28	12	4	205	182	92
4	11	Calgary Flames	82	32	35	12	3	201	220	79
5	12	Minnesota Wild	82	26	35	12	9	195	238	73

Note: CR = Conference rank; GP = Games played; W = Wins; L = Losses; T = Ties; OTL = Overtime loss; GF = Goals for; GA = Goals against; Pts = Points
Bolded teams qualified for the playoffs.

Western Conference
R		Div	GP	W	L	T	OTL	GF	GA	Pts
**1**	**p – Detroit Red Wings**	**CEN**	**82**	**51**	**17**	**10**	**4**	**251**	**187**	**116**
**2**	**y – Colorado Avalanche**	**NW**	**82**	**45**	**28**	**8**	**1**	**212**	**169**	**99**
**3**	**y – San Jose Sharks**	**PAC**	**82**	**44**	**27**	**8**	**3**	**248**	**199**	**99**
**4**	**St. Louis Blues**	**CEN**	**82**	**43**	**27**	**8**	**4**	**227**	**188**	**98**
**5**	**Chicago Blackhawks**	**CEN**	**82**	**41**	**27**	**13**	**1**	**216**	**207**	**96**
**6**	**Phoenix Coyotes**	**PAC**	**82**	**40**	**27**	**9**	**6**	**228**	**210**	**95**
**7**	**Los Angeles Kings**	**PAC**	**82**	**40**	**27**	**11**	**4**	**214**	**190**	**95**
**8**	**Vancouver Canucks**	**NW**	**82**	**42**	**30**	**7**	**3**	**254**	**211**	**94**
8.5
9	Edmonton Oilers	NW	82	38	28	12	4	205	182	92
10	Dallas Stars	PAC	82	36	28	13	5	215	213	90
11	Calgary Flames	NW	82	32	35	12	3	201	220	79
12	Minnesota Wild	NW	82	26	35	12	9	195	238	73
13	Mighty Ducks of Anaheim	PAC	82	29	42	8	3	175	198	69
14	Nashville Predators	CEN	82	28	41	13	0	196	230	69
15	Columbus Blue Jackets	CEN	82	22	47	8	5	164	255	57

Divisions: CEN – Central, PAC – Pacific, NW – Northwest

bold – Qualified for playoffs; p – Won Presidents' Trophy; y – Won division

== Schedule and results ==
2001–02 regular season
October: 8–2–0–2 (home: 5–0–0–2; road: 3–2–0–0)

Game	Date	Visitor	Score	Home	OT	Decision	Attendance	Record	Pts	Recap
1	October 3	Edmonton	0 – 1	Calgary		Turek	16,242	1–0–0–0	2	W
2	October 6	Chicago	0 – 4	Calgary		Turek	14,038	2–0–0–0	4	W
3	October 8	Phoenix	2 – 1	Calgary	OT	Turek	13,078	2–0–0–1	5	OTL
4	October 10	Calgary	4 – 2	Detroit		Turek	20,053	3–0–0–1	7	W
5	October 11	Calgary	0 – 1	Nashville		Vernon	12,333	3–1–0–1	7	L
6	October 13	Calgary	4 – 3	Dallas	OT	Turek	18,352	4–1–0–1	9	W
7	October 18	Florida	1 – 3	Calgary		Turek	15,093	5–1–0–1	11	W
8	October 20	Toronto	1 – 4	Calgary		Turek	17,279	6–1–0–1	13	W
9	October 22	Calgary	3 – 2	St. Louis		Turek	19,231	7–1–0–1	15	W
10	October 23	Calgary	3 – 6	Chicago		Vernon	10,276	7–2–0–1	15	L
11	October 25	Nashville	5 – 4	Calgary	OT	Turek	12,750	7–2–0–2	16	OTL
12	October 27	Minnesota	2 – 4	Calgary		Turek	14,088	8–2–0–2	18	W

November: 5–4–4–0 (home: 4–1–2–0; road: 1–3–2–0)

Game	Date	Visitor	Score	Home	OT	Decision	Attendance	Record	Pts	Recap
13	November 1	Columbus	1 – 2	Calgary		Turek	12,501	9–2–0–2	20	W
14	November 3	Montreal	2 – 6	Calgary		Turek	16,015	10–2–0–2	22	W
15	November 7	Calgary	3 – 3	Anaheim	OT	Turek	9,639	10–2–1–2	23	T
16	November 8	Calgary	3 – 2	Los Angeles		Turek	14,459	11–2–1–2	25	W
17	November 10	Colorado	0 – 2	Calgary		Turek	17,409	12–2–1–2	27	W
18	November 15	Chicago	2 – 2	Calgary		Turek	16,226	12–2–2–2	28	T
19	November 17	St. Louis	0 – 2	Calgary		Turek	16,241	13–2–2–2	30	W
20	November 20	Los Angeles	5 – 5	Calgary	OT	Turek	14,550	13–2–3–2	31	T
21	November 22	Calgary	4 – 4	Ottawa	OT	Turek	16,839	13–2–4–2	32	T
22	November 23	Calgary	2 – 5	Buffalo		Vernon	16,703	13–3–4–2	32	L
23	November 25	Calgary	3 – 4	Columbus		Vernon	18,136	13–4–4–2	32	L
24	November 27	Calgary	2 – 4	Detroit		Turek	20,058	13–5–4–2	32	L
25	November 29	Dallas	3 – 0	Calgary		Turek	15,610	13–6–4–2	32	L

December: 4–7–4–0 (home: 2–3–2–0; road: 2–4–2–0)

Game	Date	Visitor	Score	Home	OT	Decision	Attendance	Record	Pts	Recap
26	December 1	Colorado	2 – 2	Calgary	OT	Turek	15,806	13–6–5–2	33	T
27	December 3	Calgary	2 – 0	Los Angeles		Turek	15,105	14–6–5–2	35	W
28	December 4	Calgary	2 – 2	San Jose	OT	Vernon	17,386	14–6–6–2	36	T
29	December 6	San Jose	3 – 1	Calgary		Turek	13,012	14–7–6–2	36	L
30	December 8	Anaheim	4 – 0	Calgary		Vernon	14,330	14–8–6–2	36	L
31	December 10	Detroit	0 – 2	Calgary		Vernon	16,009	15–8–6–2	38	W
32	December 12	Tampa Bay	3 – 1	Calgary		Whitmore	13,913	15–9–6–2	38	L
33	December 14	Calgary	4 – 3	Dallas		Turek	18,532	16–9–6–2	40	W
34	December 15	Calgary	0 – 4	St. Louis		Turek	18,810	16–10–6–2	40	L
35	December 19	Calgary	3 – 6	Phoenix		Turek	11,921	16–11–6–2	40	L
36	December 21	Calgary	2 – 2	Colorado	OT	Turek	18,007	16–11–7–2	41	T
37	December 26	Calgary	2 – 3	Edmonton		Turek	16,839	16–12–7–2	41	L
38	December 27	Calgary	2 – 4	Vancouver		Turek	18,422	16–13–7–2	41	L
39	December 29	Minnesota	3 – 4	Calgary		Turek	16,730	17–13–7–2	43	W
40	December 31	Edmonton	2 – 2	Calgary	OT	Turek	17,409	17–13–8–2	44	T

January: 5–8–0–0 (home: 3–6–0–0; road: 2–2–0–0)

Game	Date	Visitor	Score	Home	OT	Decision	Attendance	Record	Pts	Recap
41	January 3	Buffalo	1 – 3	Calgary		Turek	15,316	18–13–8–2	46	W
42	January 5	Montreal	4 – 2	Calgary		Turek	17,409	18–14–8–2	46	L
43	January 8	Calgary	5 – 2	NY Islanders		Turek	13,285	19–14–8–2	48	W
44	January 9	Calgary	1 – 5	New Jersey		Turek	16,200	19–15–8–2	48	L
45	January 11	Calgary	0 – 1	Atlanta		Turek	17,856	19–16–8–2	48	L
46	January 15	NY Islanders	3 – 1	Calgary		Turek	15,624	19–17–8–2	48	L
47	January 17	Pittsburgh	6 – 4	Calgary		Turek	15,437	19–18–8–2	48	L
48	January 19	Anaheim	1 – 2	Calgary		Turek	17,409	20–18–8–2	50	W
49	January 22	Toronto	6 – 1	Calgary		Turek	17,409	20–19–8–2	50	L
50	January 24	Colorado	2 – 0	Calgary		Turek	15,639	20–20–8–2	50	L
51	January 26	Vancouver	2 – 0	Calgary		Turek	17,068	20–21–8–2	50	L
52	January 28	Calgary	3 – 2	Minnesota	OT	Turek	18,568	21–21–8–2	52	W
53	January 30	Detroit	3 – 4	Calgary		Turek	17,239	22–21–8–2	54	W

February: 2–3–1–1 (home: 1–1–0–0; road: 1–2–1–1)

Game	Date	Visitor	Score	Home	OT	Decision	Attendance	Record	Pts	Recap
54	February 6	Calgary	0 – 2	San Jose		Vernon	17,383	22–22–8–2	54	L
55	February 8	Vancouver	4 – 1	Calgary		Turek	16,695	22–23–8–2	54	L
56	February 9	Calgary	4 – 3	Vancouver		Turek	18,422	23–23–8–2	56	W
57	February 12	Calgary	3 – 4	Phoenix	OT	Turek	11,480	23–23–8–3	57	OTL
58	February 13	Calgary	2 – 3	Anaheim		Turek	9,583	23–24–8–3	57	L
59	February 26	Calgary	2 – 2	Colorado	OT	Turek	18,007	23–24–9–3	58	T
60	February 28	St. Louis	2 – 3	Calgary		Turek	16,053	24–24–9–3	60	W

March: 5–7–3–0 (home: 3–1–1–0; road: 2–6–2–0)

Game	Date	Visitor	Score	Home	OT	Decision	Attendance	Record	Pts	Recap
61	March 2	Nashville	2 – 5	Calgary		Turek	17,163	25–24–9–3	62	W
62	March 4	Calgary	5 – 3	NY Rangers		Turek	18,200	26–24–9–3	64	W
63	March 6	Calgary	2 – 3	Washington		Turek	15,817	26–25–9–3	64	L
64	March 7	Calgary	4 – 2	Philadelphia		Turek	19,532	27–25–9–3	66	W
65	March 9	Calgary	2 – 3	Boston		Turek	17,565	27–26–9–3	66	L
66	March 11	Calgary	3 – 3	Carolina	OT	Turek	12,665	27–26–10–3	67	T
67	March 13	Calgary	3 – 3	Florida	OT	Turek	13,868	27–26–11–3	68	T
68	March 14	Calgary	2 – 3	Tampa Bay		Vernon	13,473	27–27–11–3	68	L
69	March 16	Calgary	1 – 3	Columbus		Turek	18,136	27–28–11–3	68	L
70	March 18	Calgary	2 – 4	Minnesota		Turek	18,064	27–29–11–3	68	L
71	March 21	San Jose	4 – 1	Calgary		Turek	16,495	27–30–11–3	68	L
72	March 23	Calgary	1 – 3	Edmonton		Turek	16,839	27–31–11–3	68	L
73	March 25	Columbus	1 – 6	Calgary		Vernon	15,211	28–31–11–3	70	W
74	March 28	Dallas	2 – 2	Calgary	OT	Turek	16,473	28–31–12–3	71	T
75	March 30	Los Angeles	3 – 5	Calgary		Turek	17,046	29–31–12–3	73	W

April: 3–4–0–0 (home: 2–2–0–0; road: 1–2–0–0)

Game	Date	Visitor	Score	Home	OT	Decision	Attendance	Record	Pts	Recap
76	April 2	Atlanta	2 – 4	Calgary		Turek	14,562	30–31–12–3	75	W
77	April 4	Minnesota	3 – 4	Calgary		Turek	13,831	31–31–12–3	77	W
78	April 6	Calgary	1 – 3	Nashville		Turek	15,361	31–32–12–3	77	L
79	April 7	Calgary	2 – 3	Chicago		Vernon	17,009	31–33–12–3	77	L
80	April 9	Phoenix	4 – 2	Calgary		Turek	15,229	31–34–12–3	77	L
81	April 12	Calgary	2 – 0	Edmonton		Turek	16,839	32–24–12–3	79	W
82	April 13	Vancouver	4 – 1	Calgary		Vernon	18,829	32–35–12–3	79	L

Legend: W Win (2 points) L Loss (0 points) T Tie (1 point) OTL Overtime loss (1 point)

== Player statistics ==
=== Scoring ===
- Position abbreviations: C = Centre; D = Defence; G = Goaltender; LW = Left wing; RW = Right wing
- † = Joined team via a transaction (e.g., trade, waivers, signing) during the season. Stats reflect time with the Flames only.
- ‡ = Left team via a transaction (e.g., trade, waivers, release) during the season. Stats reflect time with the Flames only.
- **Bold** text denotes league leader.

No.	Player	Pos	Regular season					
No.	Player	Pos	GP	G	A	Pts	+/-	PIM
12	Jarome Iginla	RW	82	**52**	44	**96**	27	77
22	Craig Conroy	C	81	27	48	75	24	32
37	Dean McAmmond	LW	73	21	30	51	2	60
53	Derek Morris	D	61	4	30	34	−4	88
27	Marc Savard	C	56	14	19	33	−18	48
32	Toni Lydman	D	79	6	22	28	−8	52
25	Igor Kravchuk	D	78	4	22	26	3	19
44	Rob Niedermayer	LW	57	6	14	20	−15	49
23	Clarke Wilm	C	66	4	14	18	−1	61
17	Chris Clark	RW	64	10	7	17	−12	79
40	Scott Nichol	C	60	8	9	17	−9	107
18	Jamie Wright	LW	44	4	12	16	6	20
10	Dave Lowry	LW	62	7	6	13	−20	51
3	Denis Gauthier	D	66	5	8	13	9	91
26	Steve Begin	C	51	7	5	12	−3	79
36	Ronald Petrovicky	RW	77	5	7	12	0	85
28	Robyn Regehr	D	77	2	6	8	−24	93
11	Jeff Shantz	C	40	3	3	6	−3	23
6	Bob Boughner	D	79	2	4	6	9	170
24	Jukka Hentunen‡	LW	28	2	3	5	−9	4
1	Roman Turek	G	69	0	5	5		4
16	Craig Berube	LW	66	3	1	4	−2	164
8	Petr Buzek†	D	32	1	3	4	4	13
58	Steve Montador	D	11	1	2	3	−2	26
29	Mike Vernon	G	18	0	3	3		0
33	Jamie Allison‡	D	37	0	2	2	−3	24
24	Blake Sloan†	LW	7	0	2	2	1	4
15	Blair Betts	C	6	1	0	1	−1	2
20	Jason Botterill	LW	4	1	0	1	−3	2
38	Jeff Cowan‡	RW	19	1	0	1	−3	40
39	Ryan Christie	LW	2	0	0	0	−1	0
42	Micki DuPont	D	2	0	0	0	0	2
4	Dallas Eakins	D	3	0	0	0	1	4
2	Alan Letang	D	2	0	0	0	−2	0
19	Oleg Saprykin	C	3	0	0	0	−2	0
35	Kay Whitmore	G	1	0	0	0		0

=== Goaltending ===
No.	Player	Regular season									
No.	Player	GP	W	L	T	SA	GA	GAA	SV%	SO	TOI
1	Roman Turek	69	30	28	11	1839	172	2.53	.906	5	4081
29	Mike Vernon	18	2	9	1	375	38	2.76	.899	1	825
35	Kay Whitmore	1	0	1	0	21	3	3.08	.857	0	58

== Awards and records ==
=== Awards ===
Type	Award/honour	Recipient	Ref
League (annual)	Art Ross Trophy	Jarome Iginla	
League (annual)	Lester B. Pearson Award	Jarome Iginla	
League (annual)	Maurice "Rocket" Richard Trophy	Jarome Iginla	
League (annual)	NHL First All-Star Team	Jarome Iginla (Right wing)	
League (in-season)	NHL All-Star Game selection	Jarome Iginla	
League (in-season)	NHL Player of the Month	Jarome Iginla (November)	
League (in-season)	NHL Player of the Week	Roman Turek (October 8)	
League (in-season)	NHL Player of the Week	Jarome Iginla (October 29)	
League (in-season)	NHL YoungStars Game selection	Robyn Regehr	
Team	Molson Cup	Jarome Iginla	
Team	Ralph T. Scurfield Humanitarian Award	Jarome Iginla	

=== Milestones ===
Milestone	Player	Date	Ref
First game	Jukka Hentunen	October 13, 2001	
First game	Steve Montador	November 23, 2001	
First game	Blair Betts	April 4, 2002	
First game	Micki DuPont	April 12, 2002	
1,000th game played	Dave Lowry	December 8, 2001	

== Transactions ==
The Flames were involved in the following transactions from June 10, 2001, the day after the deciding game of the 2001 Stanley Cup Final, through June 13, 2002, the day of the deciding game of the 2002 Stanley Cup Final.

=== Trades ===
Date	Details		Ref
June 23, 2001	To Calgary Flames: Roman Turek; 4th-round pick in 2001	To St. Louis Blues: Fred Brathwaite; Daniel Tkaczuk; Sergei Varlamov; 9th-round pick in 2001	
June 23, 2001	To Calgary Flames: Rob Niedermayer; Philadelphia's 2nd-round pick in 2001	To Florida Panthers: Valeri Bure; Jason Wiemer	
June 23, 2001	To Calgary Flames: Burke Henry	To New York Rangers: Chris St. Croix	
June 23, 2001	To Calgary Flames: 1st-round pick in 2001; Calgary's 2nd-round pick in 2001	To Phoenix Coyotes: 1st-round pick in 2001	
June 24, 2001	To Calgary Flames: Dean McAmmond	To Philadelphia Flyers: 4th-round pick in 2002	
June 24, 2001	To Calgary Flames: Buffalo's 5th-round pick in 2001	To Columbus Blue Jackets: Rights to Paul Manning	
June 24, 2001	To Calgary Flames: 5th-round pick in 2001; 7th-round pick in 2001	To Detroit Red Wings: Buffalo's 5th-round pick in 2001	
June 24, 2001	To Calgary Flames: 7th-round pick in 2002	To New York Rangers: Detroit's 7th-round pick in 2001	
December 18, 2001	To Calgary Flames: Petr Buzek; Conditional draft pick in 2003 (Note: 6th-round pick in 2004)	To Atlanta Thrashers: Jeff Cowan; Rights to Kurtis Foster	
March 17, 2002	To Calgary Flames: Conditional draft pick in 2003	To Nashville Predators: Jukka Hentunen	
March 19, 2002	To Calgary Flames: Blake Sloan	To Columbus Blue Jackets: Jamie Allison	

=== Players acquired ===
Date	Player	Former team	Term	Via	Ref
July 2, 2001	Bob Boughner	Pittsburgh Penguins		Free agency	
July 9, 2001	Kay Whitmore	Boston Bruins		Free agency	
August 2, 2001	Ryan Christie	Dallas Stars		Free agency	
August 2, 2001	Rob Murray	Springfield Falcons (AHL)		Free agency	
August 2, 2001	Scott Nichol	Detroit Vipers (IHL)		Free agency	
August 2, 2001	Jamie Wright	Dallas Stars		Free agency	
August 6, 2001	David Huntzicker	University of Michigan (CCHA)		Free agency	
August 6, 2001	Rick Mrozik	Saint John Flames (AHL)		Free agency	
August 22, 2001	Alan Letang	Dallas Stars		Free agency	
September 18, 2001	Craig Berube	New York Islanders		Free agency	
September 28, 2001	Jamie Allison	Chicago Blackhawks		Waiver draft	

=== Players lost ===
Date	Player	New team	Via (Note: In parentheses is the player's free agency group on July 1 if applicable.)	Ref
July 1, 2001	Marc Bureau (Note: Bureau retired.)		Contract expiration (III)	
July 5, 2001	Tommy Albelin	New Jersey Devils	Free agency (III)	
July 9, 2001	Martin Brochu	Minnesota Wild	Free agency (VI)	
July 9, 2001	Marty Murray	Philadelphia Flyers	Free agency (VI)	
July 10, 2001	Darrel Scoville	Columbus Blue Jackets	Free agency (VI)	
August 2, 2001	Miika Elomo	HC TPS (Liiga)	Free agency (II)	
August 16, 2001	Dave Roche	New York Islanders	Free agency (UFA)	
September 12, 2001	Ron Sutter		Retirement (III)	
September 17, 2001	Derrick Walser	Columbus Blue Jackets	Free agency	
September 28, 2001	Phil Housley	Chicago Blackhawks	Waiver draft	
October 3, 2001	Rico Fata	New York Rangers	Waivers	

=== Signings ===
Date	Player	Term	Contract type	Ref
June 29, 2001	Craig Conroy	3-year	Re-signing	
August 6, 2001	Ronald Petrovicky		Re-signing	
August 7, 2001	Dean McAmmond		Re-signing	
August 7, 2001	Rob Niedermayer		Re-signing	
August 17, 2001	Mike Martin		Re-signing	
August 17, 2001	Dean McAmmond	multi-year	Re-signing	
August 20, 2001	Steve Begin		Re-signing	
August 31, 2001	Garett Bembridge		Entry-level	
September 1, 2001	Dallas Eakins		Re-signing	
September 20, 2001	Brent Krahn		Entry-level	
November 19, 2001	Roman Turek	multi-year	Extension	
June 7, 2002	Jordan Leopold		Entry-level	
June 7, 2002	Rick Mrozik		Extension	

== Draft picks ==
Calgary's picks at the 2001 NHL entry draft in Sunrise, Florida. The Flames had the 11th overall pick, however traded it to the Phoenix Coyotes in a swap that saw them gain the 14th pick.

Rnd	Pick	Player	Nationality	Position	Team (league)	NHL statistics				
Rnd	Pick	Player	Nationality	Position	Team (league)	GP	G	A	Pts	PIM
1	14	Chuck Kobasew	Canada	RW	Boston College (HE)	601	110	100	210	394
2	41	Andrei Taratukhin	Russia	C	Avangard Omsk (RSL)					
2	56	Andrei Medvedev	Russia	G	Spartak Moscow (RSL)					
4	108	Tomi Maki	Finland	RW	Jokerit (FIN)	1	0	0	0	0
4	124	Egor Shastin	Russia	F	Avangard Omsk (RSL)					
5	145	James Hakewill	United States	D	Westminster (USHS)					
5	164	Yuri Trubachev	Russia	C	St. Petersburg (RUS)					
7	207	Garrett Bembridge	Canada	RW	Saskatoon Blades (WHL)					
7	220	David Moss	United States	RW	Cedar Rapids RoughRiders (USHL)	501	78	100	178	157
8	233	Joe Campbell	United States	D	Des Moines Buccaneers (USHL)					
8	251	Ville Hamalainen	Finland	RW	SaiPa (FIN)					

== Farm teams ==
=== Saint John Flames ===
The baby Flames followed up their Calder Cup winning season with a disappointing 29–34–13–4 result in 2001–02, finishing in last place in the Canadian Division, missing the playoffs. Blair Betts led the Flames with just 49 points, while Dany Sabourin was the top goaltender in limited action.

=== Johnstown Chiefs ===
The Chiefs finished the 2001–02 ECHL season with a 39–31–2 record, good enough for third place in the Northwest Division. They were knocked out of the playoffs in the second round by the Dayton Bombers.

== See also ==
- 2001–02 NHL season
