= Richard Scott (ice hockey) =

Canadian ice hockey player

- Born: August 1, 1978 (age 46); Orillia, Ontario, Canada
- Height: 6 ft 2 in (188 cm)
- Weight: 195 lb (88 kg; 13 st 13 lb)
- Position: Left wing
- Shot: Left
- Played for: New York Rangers
- NHL draft: Undrafted
- Playing career: 1999–2004

Richard Scott (born August 1, 1978) is a Canadian former ice hockey player who played 10 games in the National Hockey League for the New York Rangers during the 2001–02 and 2003–04 seasons. After suffering a concussion in a fight against Eric Cairns on December 4, 2003, Scott was forced to retire from hockey.

== Career statistics ==
=== Regular season and playoffs ===
			Regular season					Playoffs
Season	Team	League	GP	G	A	Pts	PIM	GP	G	A	Pts	PIM
1994–95	Orillia Terriers	OPJHL	2	0	0	0	0	—	—	—	—	—
1995–96	Orillia Terriers	OPJHL	34	3	3	6	67	—	—	—	—	—
1996–97	Orillia Terriers	OPJHL	10	0	0	0	23	—	—	—	—	—
1997–98	Couchiching Terriers	OPJHL	45	13	19	32	166	—	—	—	—	—
1998–99	Oshawa Generals	OHL	54	12	12	24	193	10	1	3	4	23
1999–00	Charlotte Checkers	ECHL	55	1	5	6	317	—	—	—	—	—
2000–01	Charlotte Checkers	ECHL	4	1	1	2	22	—	—	—	—	—
2000–01	Hartford Wolf Pack	AHL	64	2	5	7	320	1	0	0	0	0
2001–02	New York Rangers	NHL	5	0	0	0	5	—	—	—	—	—
2001–02	Hartford Wolf Pack	AHL	39	2	3	5	211	—	—	—	—	—
2002–03	Charlotte Checkers	ECHL	3	0	1	1	4	—	—	—	—	—
2002–03	Hartford Wolf Pack	AHL	32	0	5	5	150	2	0	0	0	16
2003–04	New York Rangers	NHL	5	0	0	0	23	—	—	—	—	—
2003–04	Hartford Wolf Pack	AHL	15	2	2	4	79	—	—	—	—	—
AHL totals			150	6	15	21	760	3	0	0	0	16
NHL totals			10	0	0	0	28	—	—	—	—	—
