= 2002 National Hockey League All-Star Game =

Professional ice hockey exhibition game

2002 NHL All-Star Game
	1	2	3	Total
World	2	1	5	8
North America	3	2	0	5
- Date: February 2, 2002
- Arena: Staples Center
- City: Los Angeles
- MVP: Eric Daze (Chicago)
- Attendance: 18,118

The 2002 National Hockey League All-Star Game took place on February 2, 2002, at the Staples Center in Los Angeles. The final score was World 8, North America 5. This was the last NHL All-Star Game to have the North America vs. World All-Star format. It was also the last All-Star Game that was held in the same year as the Winter Olympics until the 2018 edition, and is the last to date to be held in the same year as Olympic participation.

== All-Star weekend ==
=== NHL YoungStars Game ===
The inaugural NHL YoungStars Game was played (replacing Heroes of Hockey old-timers game) featuring the future young stars of the NHL. The two teams were divided between Team Melrose and Team Fox. The game format had four skaters (and one goaltender) per side and the first two periods were for 12 minutes running time, and then the third period would run for 11 minutes, running time, plus a final minute of stop time. The teams were allowed a four-minute break between periods. If the score is tied after three periods, a sudden-murder shootout will determine the winner. Team Melrose would defeat Team Fox by a score of 13–7, as Atlanta Thrashers' Ilya Kovalchuk would score six goals for Team Melrose, with one of them being on a penalty shot. Kovalchuk was named as the first-ever YoungStars MVP.

=== Super Skills Competition ===
The World All-Stars would win their fourth and last skills competition barely defeating the North American All-Stars by a score of 12–11. In the individual events, Mighty Ducks of Anaheim' Paul Kariya would win his fourth-straight Puck Control Relay event, while Carolina Hurricanes' Sami Kapanen would win his second Fastest Skater event and Detroit Red Wings' Sergei Fedorov would win his first Hardest Shot event. Two individual events would be shared as Calgary Flames' Jarome Iginla and Vancouver Canucks' Markus Naslund would share the Accuracy Shooting event title and Colorado Avalanche's Patrick Roy and Detroit Red Wings' Dominik Hasek would win the Goaltenders Competition after the Pass and Score and Breakaway Relay events.

==== Individual event winners ====
- Puck Control Relay – Paul Kariya (Mighty Ducks of Anaheim)
- Fastest Skater – Sami Kapanen (Carolina Hurricanes) - 14.039 seconds
- Accuracy Shooting – Jarome Iginla (Calgary Flames)/Markus Naslund (Vancouver Canucks) - 4 hits, 6 shots
- Hardest Shot – Sergei Fedorov (Detroit Red Wings) - 101.5 mph
- Goaltenders Competition – Patrick Roy (Colorado Avalanche)/Dominik Hasek (Detroit Red Wings) - 1 GA, 9 shots

== The game ==
The 52nd NHL All-Star Game was highlighted by Pittsburgh Penguins' Mario Lemieux's 13th career goal which tied Wayne Gretzky for the most goals scored in All-Star Game competition, Tampa Bay Lightning goalie Nikolai Khabibulin's flawless third period and a flawed MVP selection process. Three players would put up three-point performances that included North American All-Stars Chicago Blackhawks' leftwinger Eric Daze (2–1–3) and San Jose Sharks' centre Vincent Damphousse (1–2–3), while Vancouver Canucks' left winger Markus Naslund (2–1–3) would be the only player for the World All-Stars to score three points. The World All-Stars rallied for 5 goals in the third period and a comeback win. Daze who was appearing in his first All-Star Game, was chosen as All-Star MVP, becoming the first Blackhawk player to win the award since 1971 when Bobby Hull won the award. A minor controversy ensued over the MVP selection, as World All-Stars goalie Khabibulin recorded a third period shutout that allowed his team to storm back from 5–3 down. Apparently voting was conducted with about 5 minutes remaining in the game while the North American All-Stars still held the lead. Afterwards the talk in both locker rooms was about the Russian goaltender's play, what it might mean for the upcoming Olympics in two weeks and their disappointment that his 20 save performance didn't win him an honor, which many of them thought was both deserved and obvious.

=== Uniforms ===
Continuing from the previous two All-Star Games, the NHL continued to use a color-vs.color format. The North American team's jersey was the same shade of blue as the logo of the Eastern Conference, the same shade of blue previously used by the World team in 1998 and 1999; the jersey also featured the first tie-down collar in the All-Star Game since 1970. The World team used the Western Conference's burgundy color, and a unique horizontal-cut collar. Both uniforms featured predominantly black trim with silver and white accents, and a scooped hemline that would become prevalent with the Reebok Edge and Adidas ADIZERO uniform systems. Although the game was hosted by the Kings, the name and number fonts used on the All-Star jerseys were similar to those used by the Nashville Predators.

Due to complaints about the uniforms being too dark and lacking sufficient contrast to each other, the NHL would replace the burgundy jersey with a white one in the next year's game.

=== Summary ===
	North America	World
Final score	5	8
Scoring summary	Damphousse (Blake) 0:35 1st; Jovanovski (Damphousse, Daze) 10:06 1st; Daze (unassisted) 15:05 1st; Lemieux (Kariya) 2:02 2nd; Daze (2) (Pronger, Damphousse) 11:33 2nd	Selanne (Zhamnov) 13:10 1st; Selanne (2) (Kapanen, Kaberle) 16:52 1st; Naslund (Knutsen) 5:26 2nd; Knutsen (Sundin, Naslund) 7:52 3rd; Fedorov (Gonchar) 16:59 3rd; Naslund (2) (Sundin) 18:17 3rd (GWG); Zhamnov (Yashin) 19:12 3rd (ENG); Kapanen (Elias, Ozolinsh) 19:56 3rd (ENG)
Penalties	none	none
Shots on goal	13–17–20–50	14–9–16–39
Win/loss	L - Sean Burke	W - Nikolai Khabibulin

- Referees: Dave Jackson, Don Van Massenhoven
- Linesmen: Andy McElman, Mark Pare
- Television: ABC, CBC, SRC

== Rosters ==
	North America	World
Head coach	(Canada) Pat Quinn (Toronto Maple Leafs)	(Canada) Scotty Bowman (Detroit Red Wings)
Assistant coach	(United States) Robbie Ftorek (Boston Bruins)	(Canada) Brian Sutter (Chicago Blackhawks)
Lineup	Starting lineup: 4 - (Canada) D Rob Blake (Colorado Avalanche); 11 - (Canada) RW Owen Nolan (San Jose Sharks); 14 - (Canada) LW Brendan Shanahan (Detroit Red Wings); 25 - (Canada) C Vincent Damphousse (San Jose Sharks); 33 - (Canada) G Patrick Roy (Colorado Avalanche); 44 - (Canada) D Chris Pronger (St. Louis Blues); Reserves: 1 - (Canada) G Sean Burke (Phoenix Coyotes); 2 - (United States) D Brian Leetch (New York Rangers); 5 - (Canada) D Ed Jovanovski (Vancouver Canucks); 6 - (Canada) D Wade Redden (Ottawa Senators); 9 - (Canada) LW Paul Kariya (Mighty Ducks of Anaheim); 12 - (Canada) RW Jarome Iginla (Calgary Flames); 16 - (United States) LW Mike York (New York Rangers); 19 - (Canada) C Joe Sakic (Colorado Avalanche) - (C); 24 - (United States) D Chris Chelios (Detroit Red Wings); 37 - (United States) RW Mark Parrish (New York Islanders); 55 - (Canada) LW Eric Daze (Chicago Blackhawks); 60 - (Canada) G Jose Theodore (Montreal Canadiens); 66 - (Canada) C Mario Lemieux (Pittsburgh Penguins); 91 - (Canada) C Joe Thornton (Boston Bruins); 97 - (United States) C Jeremy Roenick (Philadelphia Flyers)	Starting lineup: 5 - (Sweden) D Nicklas Lidstrom (Detroit Red Wings); 8 - (Finland) RW Teemu Selanne (San Jose Sharks); 18 - (Latvia) D Sandis Ozolinsh (Florida Panthers); 39 - (Czech Republic) G Dominik Hasek (Detroit Red Wings); 68 - (Czech Republic) LW Jaromir Jagr (Washington Capitals); 91 - (Russia) C Sergei Fedorov (Detroit Red Wings); Reserves: 4 - (Czech Republic) D Jaroslav Modry (Los Angeles Kings); 13 - (Sweden) C Mats Sundin (Toronto Maple Leafs) - (C); 15 - (Czech Republic) D Tomas Kaberle (Toronto Maple Leafs); 19 - (Sweden) LW Markus Naslund (Vancouver Canucks); 21 - (Norway) C Espen Knutsen (Columbus Blue Jackets); 24 - (Finland) LW Sami Kapanen (Carolina Hurricanes); 27 - (Czech Republic) LW Patrik Elias (New Jersey Devils); 33 - (Slovakia) RW Zigmund Palffy (Los Angeles Kings); 35 - (Sweden) G Tommy Salo (Edmonton Oilers); 38 - (Slovakia) RW Pavol Demitra (St. Louis Blues); 44 - (Russia) D Alexei Zhitnik (Buffalo Sabres); 53 - (Russia) G Nikolai Khabibulin (Tampa Bay Lightning); 55 - (Russia) D Sergei Gonchar (Washington Capitals); 70 - (Russia) C Alexei Zhamnov (Chicago Blackhawks); 79 - (Russia) C Alexei Yashin (New York Islanders)

Notes
1.Eric Lindros was selected, but was unable to play due to injury. Mike York was selected as his replacement.
2.Brian Rafalski was selected, but was unable to play due to injury. Chris Chelios was selected as his replacement.
3.Jere Lehtinen was selected, but was unable to play due to injury. Espen Knutsen was named as his replacement.

== See also ==
- 2001–02 NHL season
