= 2001–02 Phoenix Coyotes season =

NHL hockey team season

2001–02 Phoenix Coyotes
- Division: 2nd Pacific
- Conference: 6th Western
- 2001–02 record: 40–27–9–6
- Home record: 27–8–3–3
- Road record: 13–19–6–3
- Goals for: 228
- Goals against: 210

Team information
- General manager: Mike Barnett
- Coach: Bob Francis
- Captain: Teppo Numminen
- Alternate captains: Shane Doan; Claude Lemieux
- Arena: America West Arena
- Average attendance: 13,165
- Minor league affiliates: Springfield Falcons; Mississippi Sea Wolves

Team leaders
- Goals: Daniel Briere (32)
- Assists: Teppo Numminen (35)
- Points: Daymond Langkow (62)
- Penalty minutes: Todd Simpson (152)
- Plus/minus: Radoslav Suchy (+25)
- Wins: Sean Burke (33)
- Goals against average: Sean Burke (2.29)

The 2001–02 Phoenix Coyotes season was their sixth season in the National Hockey League, the franchise's 23rd season in the NHL and 30th overall. The Coyotes qualified for the playoffs after a one–year absence, but lost in the Western Conference Quarterfinals to the San Jose Sharks in five games. It was the Coyotes' final playoff berth for seven years.

== Off-season ==
Defenseman Teppo Numminen was named captain.

== Regular season ==
=== Final standings ===
Pacific Division
No.	CR		GP	W	L	T	OTL	GF	GA	Pts
1	3	**San Jose Sharks**	82	44	27	8	3	248	189	99
2	6	**Phoenix Coyotes**	82	40	27	9	6	228	210	95
3	7	**Los Angeles Kings**	82	40	27	11	4	214	190	95
4	10	Dallas Stars	82	36	28	13	5	215	213	90
5	13	Mighty Ducks of Anaheim	82	29	42	8	3	175	198	69

Note: CR = Conference rank; GP = Games played; W = Wins; L = Losses; T = Ties; OTL = Overtime loss; GF = Goals for; GA = Goals against; Pts = Points
Bolded teams qualified for the playoffs.

Western Conference
R		Div	GP	W	L	T	OTL	GF	GA	Pts
**1**	**p – Detroit Red Wings**	**CEN**	**82**	**51**	**17**	**10**	**4**	**251**	**187**	**116**
**2**	**y – Colorado Avalanche**	**NW**	**82**	**45**	**28**	**8**	**1**	**212**	**169**	**99**
**3**	**y – San Jose Sharks**	**PAC**	**82**	**44**	**27**	**8**	**3**	**248**	**199**	**99**
**4**	**St. Louis Blues**	**CEN**	**82**	**43**	**27**	**8**	**4**	**227**	**188**	**98**
**5**	**Chicago Blackhawks**	**CEN**	**82**	**41**	**27**	**13**	**1**	**216**	**207**	**96**
**6**	**Phoenix Coyotes**	**PAC**	**82**	**40**	**27**	**9**	**6**	**228**	**210**	**95**
**7**	**Los Angeles Kings**	**PAC**	**82**	**40**	**27**	**11**	**4**	**214**	**190**	**95**
**8**	**Vancouver Canucks**	**NW**	**82**	**42**	**30**	**7**	**3**	**254**	**211**	**94**
8.5
9	Edmonton Oilers	NW	82	38	28	12	4	205	182	92
10	Dallas Stars	PAC	82	36	28	13	5	215	213	90
11	Calgary Flames	NW	82	32	35	12	3	201	220	79
12	Minnesota Wild	NW	82	26	35	12	9	195	238	73
13	Mighty Ducks of Anaheim	PAC	82	29	42	8	3	175	198	69
14	Nashville Predators	CEN	82	28	41	13	0	196	230	69
15	Columbus Blue Jackets	CEN	82	22	47	8	5	164	255	57

Divisions: CEN – Central, PAC – Pacific, NW – Northwest

bold – Qualified for playoffs; p – Won Presidents' Trophy; y – Won division

== Playoffs ==
The series started in San Jose. The Sharks were victorious in Game 1 by a score of 2–1. However, in Game 2, the Coyotes rebounded and won 3–1. Games 3 and 4 went to Phoenix. In Game 3, the Sharks won 4–1, while in Game 4, the Sharks won 2–1. Game 5 shifted back to San Jose, where the Sharks would win the game 4–1 and win the series 4–1.

== Schedule and results ==
=== Regular season ===
2001–02 regular season
October: 5–3–2–1 (home: 3–0–1–1; road: 2–3–1–0)

Game	Date	Score	Opponent	Record	Recap
1	October 4, 2001	2–2 OT	@ Los Angeles Kings (2001–02)	0–0–1–0	T
2	October 6, 2001	2–6	@ Edmonton Oilers (2001–02)	0–1–1–0	L
3	October 8, 2001	2–1 OT	@ Calgary Flames (2001–02)	1–1–1–0	W
4	October 11, 2001	0–3	@ Chicago Blackhawks (2001–02)	1–2–1–0	L
5	October 13, 2001	5–2	Washington Capitals (2001–02)	2–2–1–0	W
6	October 16, 2001	1–1 OT	Boston Bruins (2001–02)	2–2–2–0	T
7	October 18, 2001	1–3	@ Dallas Stars (2001–02)	2–3–2–0	L
8	October 20, 2001	5–2	Vancouver Canucks (2001–02)	3–3–2–0	W
9	October 24, 2001	2–3 OT	Mighty Ducks of Anaheim (2001–02)	3–3–2–1	OTL
10	October 27, 2001	1–0	Colorado Avalanche (2001–02)	4–3–2–1	W
11	October 30, 2001	3–2	@ Buffalo Sabres (2001–02)	5–3–2–1	W

November: 5–6–1–2 (home: 4–1–0–1; road: 1–5–1–1)

Game	Date	Score	Opponent	Record	Recap
12	November 1, 2001	2–5	@ New Jersey Devils (2001–02)	5–4–2–1	L
13	November 2, 2001	2–2 OT	@ Washington Capitals (2001–02)	5–4–3–1	T
14	November 4, 2001	0–1 OT	@ Carolina Hurricanes (2001–02)	5–4–3–2	OTL
15	November 7, 2001	1–3	Detroit Red Wings (2001–02)	5–5–3–2	L
16	November 9, 2001	5–1	@ Dallas Stars (2001–02)	6–5–3–2	W
17	November 10, 2001	1–4	@ St. Louis Blues (2001–02)	6–6–3–2	L
18	November 13, 2001	4–5 OT	Edmonton Oilers (2001–02)	6–6–3–3	OTL
19	November 15, 2001	5–3	San Jose Sharks (2001–02)	7–6–3–3	W
20	November 17, 2001	6–1	New York Islanders (2001–02)	8–6–3–3	W
21	November 20, 2001	2–1 OT	Minnesota Wild (2001–02)	9–6–3–3	W
22	November 23, 2001	2–5	@ Minnesota Wild (2001–02)	9–7–3–3	L
23	November 24, 2001	3–5	@ St. Louis Blues (2001–02)	9–8–3–3	L
24	November 27, 2001	0–3	@ Columbus Blue Jackets (2001–02)	9–9–3–3	L
25	November 29, 2001	1–0	Nashville Predators (2001–02)	10–9–3–3	W

December: 7–5–3–0 (home: 6–2–1–0; road: 1–3–2–0)

Game	Date	Score	Opponent	Record	Recap
26	December 1, 2001	5–2	Pittsburgh Penguins (2001–02)	11–9–3–3	W
27	December 5, 2001	3–0	St. Louis Blues (2001–02)	12–9–3–3	W
28	December 7, 2001	1–1 OT	@ Detroit Red Wings (2001–02)	12–9–4–3	T
29	December 8, 2001	3–3 OT	@ Montreal Canadiens (2001–02)	12–9–5–3	T
30	December 11, 2001	3–6	@ Toronto Maple Leafs (2001–02)	12–10–5–3	L
31	December 13, 2001	0–6	@ Ottawa Senators (2001–02)	12–11–5–3	L
32	December 15, 2001	2–6	Dallas Stars (2001–02)	12–12–5–3	L
33	December 17, 2001	4–1	Columbus Blue Jackets (2001–02)	13–12–5–3	W
34	December 19, 2001	6–3	Calgary Flames (2001–02)	14–12–5–3	W
35	December 21, 2001	1–2	@ Mighty Ducks of Anaheim (2001–02)	14–13–5–3	L
36	December 23, 2001	0–4	Mighty Ducks of Anaheim (2001–02)	14–14–5–3	L
37	December 26, 2001	1–1 OT	Los Angeles Kings (2001–02)	14–14–6–3	T
38	December 28, 2001	4–2	Philadelphia Flyers (2001–02)	15–14–6–3	W
39	December 30, 2001	4–2	@ San Jose Sharks (2001–02)	16–14–6–3	W
40	December 31, 2001	5–0	New York Rangers (2001–02)	17–14–6–3	W

January: 6–5–1–1 (home: 1–3–1–0; road: 5–2–0–1)

Game	Date	Score	Opponent	Record	Recap
41	January 3, 2002	2–1	Atlanta Thrashers (2001–02)	18–14–6–3	W
42	January 4, 2002	3–5	@ San Jose Sharks (2001–02)	18–15–6–3	L
43	January 6, 2002	0–3	Tampa Bay Lightning (2001–02)	18–16–6–3	L
44	January 9, 2002	5–6	San Jose Sharks (2001–02)	18–17–6–3	L
45	January 15, 2002	2–2 OT	Detroit Red Wings (2001–02)	18–17–7–3	T
46	January 17, 2002	2–3 OT	@ Colorado Avalanche (2001–02)	18–17–7–4	OTL
47	January 19, 2002	1–3	Buffalo Sabres (2001–02)	18–18–7–4	L
48	January 21, 2002	1–0	@ Nashville Predators (2001–02)	19–18–7–4	W
49	January 23, 2002	4–1	@ Chicago Blackhawks (2001–02)	20–18–7–4	W
50	January 25, 2002	1–4	@ Detroit Red Wings (2001–02)	20–19–7–4	L
51	January 26, 2002	3–2	@ Columbus Blue Jackets (2001–02)	21–19–7–4	W
52	January 28, 2002	4–2	@ Atlanta Thrashers (2001–02)	22–19–7–4	W
53	January 30, 2002	3–1	@ Florida Panthers (2001–02)	23–19–7–4	W

February: 3–3–1–1 (home: 3–2–0–0; road: 0–1–1–1)

Game	Date	Score	Opponent	Record	Recap
54	February 4, 2002	2–4	@ Vancouver Canucks (2001–02)	23–20–7–4	L
55	February 6, 2002	2–5	Chicago Blackhawks (2001–02)	23–21–7–4	L
56	February 8, 2002	6–5 OT	Los Angeles Kings (2001–02)	24–21–7–4	W
57	February 10, 2002	3–4	Edmonton Oilers (2001–02)	24–22–7–4	L
58	February 12, 2002	4–3 OT	Calgary Flames (2001–02)	25–22–7–4	W
59	February 13, 2002	2–2 OT	@ Los Angeles Kings (2001–02)	25–22–8–4	T
60	February 26, 2002	5–1	Dallas Stars (2001–02)	26–22–8–4	W
61	February 28, 2002	1–2 OT	@ Colorado Avalanche (2001–02)	26–22–8–5	OTL

March: 10–2–1–1 (home: 7–0–0–1; road: 3–2–1–0)

Game	Date	Score	Opponent	Record	Recap
62	March 3, 2002	2–1	Columbus Blue Jackets (2001–02)	27–22–8–5	W
63	March 5, 2002	4–1	New Jersey Devils (2001–02)	28–22–8–5	W
64	March 7, 2002	6–1	Vancouver Canucks (2001–02)	29–22–8–5	W
65	March 9, 2002	3–2	Ottawa Senators (2001–02)	30–22–8–5	W
66	March 12, 2002	3–1	Chicago Blackhawks (2001–02)	31–22–8–5	W
67	March 15, 2002	3–2	@ Nashville Predators (2001–02)	32–22–8–5	W
68	March 17, 2002	2–2 OT	@ Minnesota Wild (2001–02)	32–22–9–5	T
69	March 19, 2002	2–4	@ Boston Bruins (2001–02)	32–23–9–5	L
70	March 20, 2002	3–1	@ Pittsburgh Penguins (2001–02)	33–23–9–5	W
71	March 22, 2002	3–4	@ Dallas Stars (2001–02)	33–24–9–5	L
72	March 24, 2002	4–0	Los Angeles Kings (2001–02)	34–24–9–5	W
73	March 27, 2002	4–2	@ Mighty Ducks of Anaheim (2001–02)	35–24–9–5	W
74	March 28, 2002	1–2 OT	Mighty Ducks of Anaheim (2001–02)	35–24–9–6	OTL
75	March 30, 2002	5–3	Colorado Avalanche (2001–02)	36–24–9–6	W

April: 4–3–0–0 (home: 3–0–0–0; road: 1–3–0–0)

Game	Date	Score	Opponent	Record	Recap
76	April 1, 2002	5–3	St. Louis Blues (2001–02)	37–24–9–6	W
77	April 4, 2002	2–5	@ San Jose Sharks (2001–02)	37–25–9–6	L
78	April 7, 2002	3–4	@ Vancouver Canucks (2001–02)	37–26–9–6	L
79	April 9, 2002	4–2	@ Calgary Flames (2001–02)	38–26–9–6	W
80	April 10, 2002	0–3	@ Edmonton Oilers (2001–02)	38–27–9–6	L
81	April 12, 2002	7–1	Minnesota Wild (2001–02)	39–27–9–6	W
82	April 14, 2002	6–4	Nashville Predators (2001–02)	40–27–9–6	W

Legend: W Win (2 points) L Loss (0 points) T Tie (1 point) OTL Overtime loss (1 point)

=== Playoffs ===
2002 Stanley Cup playoffs
Western Conference Quarterfinals vs. (3) San Jose Sharks – Sharks win 4–1

Game	Date	Score	Opponent	Series	Recap
1	April 17, 2002	1–2	@ San Jose Sharks	Sharks lead 1–0	L
2	April 20, 2002	3–1	@ San Jose Sharks	Series tied 1–1	W
3	April 22, 2002	1–4	San Jose Sharks	Sharks lead 2–1	L
4	April 24, 2002	1–2	San Jose Sharks	Sharks lead 3–1	L
5	April 26, 2002	1–4	@ San Jose Sharks	Sharks win 4–1	L

Legend: W Win L Loss

== Player statistics ==
=== Scoring ===
- Position abbreviations: C = Center; D = Defense; G = Goaltender; LW = Left wing; RW = Right wing
- † = Joined team via a transaction (e.g., trade, waivers, signing) during the season. Stats reflect time with the Coyotes only.
- ‡ = Left team via a transaction (e.g., trade, waivers, release) during the season. Stats reflect time with the Coyotes only.

No.	Player	Pos	Regular season						Playoffs					
No.	Player	Pos	GP	G	A	Pts	+/-	PIM	GP	G	A	Pts	+/-	PIM
11	Daymond Langkow	C	80	27	35	62	18	36	5	1	0	1	−2	0
8	Daniel Briere	C	78	32	28	60	6	52	5	2	1	3	−4	2
19	Shane Doan	RW	81	20	29	49	11	61	5	2	2	4	−2	6
27	Teppo Numminen	D	76	13	35	48	13	20	4	0	0	0	0	2
16	Michal Handzus	C	79	15	30	45	−8	34	5	0	0	0	−2	2
17	Ladislav Nagy	LW	74	23	19	42	6	50	5	0	0	0	−2	21
22	Claude Lemieux	RW	82	16	25	41	−5	70	5	0	0	0	−2	2
55	Danny Markov	D	72	6	30	36	−7	67	—	—	—	—	—	—
12	Mike Johnson	RW	57	5	22	27	14	28	5	1	1	2	1	6
23	Paul Mara	D	75	7	17	24	−6	58	5	0	0	0	−4	4
36	Krys Kolanos	C	57	11	11	22	6	48	2	0	0	0	−1	6
32	Brad May	LW	72	10	12	22	11	95	5	0	0	0	0	0
28	Landon Wilson	RW	47	7	12	19	4	46	4	0	0	0	−2	12
15	Radoslav Suchy	D	81	4	13	17	25	10	5	1	0	1	−5	0
94	Sergei Berezin‡	LW	41	7	9	16	−1	4	—	—	—	—	—	—
2	Todd Simpson	D	67	2	13	15	20	152	5	0	2	2	−1	6
4	Ossi Vaananen	D	76	2	12	14	6	74	5	0	0	0	0	6
49	Brian Savage†	LW	30	6	6	12	1	8	5	0	0	0	−1	0
44	Andrei Nazarov†	LW	30	6	3	9	7	51	3	0	0	0	0	2
10	Trevor Letowski‡	RW	33	2	6	8	2	4	—	—	—	—	—	—
29	Branko Radivojevic	RW	18	4	2	6	1	4	1	0	0	0	−1	2
5 (Note: Berehowsky wore number 33 in his first game.)	Drake Berehowsky†	D	32	1	4	5	5	42	5	0	1	1	−3	4
26	Mike Sullivan	C	42	1	2	3	−3	16	—	—	—	—	—	—
21	Todd Warriner‡	LW	18	0	3	3	−3	8	—	—	—	—	—	—
10	Denis Pederson†	RW	19	1	1	2	−2	20	5	0	2	2	2	0
1	Sean Burke	G	60	0	1	1		14	5	0	2	2		0
45 (Note: Jaspers wore number 49 until Savage was acquired.)	Jason Jaspers	C	4	0	1	1	−1	4	—	—	—	—	—	—
18	Sebastien Bordeleau†	C	6	0	0	0	−1	2	—	—	—	—	—	—
14	Tyler Bouck‡	C	7	0	0	0	−1	4	—	—	—	—	—	—
24	David Cullen‡	D	14	0	0	0	−5	6	—	—	—	—	—	—
40	Patrick DesRochers	G	5	0	0	0		2	—	—	—	—	—	—
42	Robert Esche	G	22	0	0	0		16	—	—	—	—	—	—
37	Dan Focht	D	8	0	0	0	0	11	1	0	1	1	1	0
38	Martin Grenier	D	5	0	0	0	0	5	—	—	—	—	—	—
24	Darcy Hordichuk†	LW	1	0	0	0	0	14	—	—	—	—	—	—
5	Kirill Safronov‡	D	1	0	0	0	−2	0	—	—	—	—	—	—
20	Wyatt Smith	C	10	0	0	0	−5	0	—	—	—	—	—	—
31	Jean-Guy Trudel	LW	3	0	0	0	0	2	—	—	—	—	—	—

=== Goaltending ===
No.	Player	Regular season										Playoffs								
No.	Player	GP	W	L	T	SA	GA	GAA	SV%	SO	TOI	GP	W	L	SA	GA	GAA	SV%	SO	TOI
1	Sean Burke	60	33	21	6	1711	137	2.29	.920	5	3587	5	1	4	133	13	2.63	.902	0	297
42	Robert Esche	22	6	10	2	533	52	2.73	.902	1	1145	—	—	—	—	—	—	—	—	—
40	Patrick DesRochers	5	1	2	1	99	15	3.71	.848	0	243	—	—	—	—	—	—	—	—	—

== Awards and records ==
=== Awards ===
Type	Award/honor	Recipient	Ref
League (annual)	Jack Adams Award	Bobby Francis	
League (in-season)	NHL All-Star Game selection	Sean Burke	
League (in-season)	NHL Player of the Month	Sean Burke (March)	
League (in-season)	NHL Rookie of the Month	Krys Kolanos (November)	
League (in-season)	NHL YoungStars Game selection	Krys Kolanos (Note: Kolanos did not play and was replaced by Pavel Datsyuk of the Detroit Red Wings.)	
League (in-season)	NHL YoungStars Game selection	Paul Mara (Note: Mara was an injury replacement for Rostislav Klesla of the Columbus Blue Jackets.)	
Team	Hardest Working Player Award	Shane Doan	
Team	Leading Scorer Award	Daymond Langkow	
Team	Man of the Year Award	Landon Wilson	
Team	Team MVP Award	Sean Burke	
Team	Three-Star Award	Sean Burke	

=== Milestones ===
Milestone	Player	Date	Ref
First game	Krys Kolanos	October 4, 2001	
First game	Martin Grenier	October 11, 2001	
First game	Patrick DesRochers	November 23, 2001	
First game	Dan Focht	December 15, 2001	
First game	Kirill Safronov	December 23, 2001	
First game	Jason Jaspers	January 21, 2002	
First game	Branko Radivojevic	March 3, 2002	
1,000th game played	Teppo Numminen	March 3, 2002	

== Transactions ==
The Coyotes were involved in the following transactions from June 10, 2001, the day after the deciding game of the 2001 Stanley Cup Final, through June 13, 2002, the day of the deciding game of the 2002 Stanley Cup Final.

=== Trades ===
Date	Details		Ref
June 12, 2001	To Toronto Maple Leafs: Travis Green; Craig Mills; Rights to Robert Reichel	To Phoenix Coyotes: Danny Markov	
June 15, 2001	To Montreal Canadiens: Joe Juneau	To Phoenix Coyotes: Future considerations	
June 18, 2001	To Tampa Bay Lightning: Juha Ylonen	To Phoenix Coyotes: Todd Warriner	
June 19, 2001	To Anaheim Mighty Ducks: Keith Carney	To Phoenix Coyotes: 2nd-round pick in 2001	
June 22, 2001	To Toronto Maple Leafs: Mikael Renberg	To Phoenix Coyotes: Sergei Berezin	
June 23, 2001	To Calgary Flames: 1st-round pick in 2001; Calgary’s 2nd-round pick in 2001	To Phoenix Coyotes: 1st-round pick in 2001	
June 23, 2001	To New Jersey Devils: 4th-round pick in 2001; 3rd-round pick in 2002	To Phoenix Coyotes: Phoenix’s 3rd-round pick in 2001	
June 23, 2001	To Dallas Stars: Jyrki Lumme	To Phoenix Coyotes: Tyler Bouck	
July 2, 2001	To Philadelphia Flyers: Choice of 1st and 2nd-round picks (Note: The Flyers had the option of receiving either the St. Louis Blues first-round pick in 2002 and a second-round pick in 2003, or a second-round pick in 2002 and a first-round pick in 2003. The Flyers chose the 2002 second-round pick and 2003 first-round pick.)	To Phoenix Coyotes: Daymond Langkow	
December 28, 2001	To Vancouver Canucks: Tyler Bouck; Trevor Letowski; Todd Warriner; 3rd-round pick in 2003	To Phoenix Coyotes: Drake Berehowsky; Denis Pederson	
January 4, 2002	To Minnesota Wild: David Cullen	To Phoenix Coyotes: Sebastien Bordeleau	
January 25, 2002	To Boston Bruins: 5th-round pick in 2002	To Phoenix Coyotes: Andrei Nazarov	
January 25, 2002	To Montreal Canadiens: Sergei Berezin	To Phoenix Coyotes: Brian Savage; 3rd-round pick in 2002 or 2003 (Note: Phoenix’s choice.); Future considerations	
March 19, 2002	To Atlanta Thrashers: Kirill Safronov; Rights to Ruslan Zainullin; 4th-round pick in 2002	To Phoenix Coyotes: Darcy Hordichuk; 4th-round pick in 2002; 5th-round pick in 2002	
June 12, 2002	To Philadelphia Flyers: Robert Esche; Michal Handzus	To Phoenix Coyotes: Brian Boucher; Nashville’s 3rd-round pick in 2002	

=== Players acquired ===
Date	Player	Former team	Term	Via	Ref
June 19, 2001	Branko Radivojevic	Belleville Bulls (OHL)	multi-year	Free agency	
August 30, 2001	Zac Bierk	Minnesota Wild	1-year (Note: Club option for a second year.)	Free agency	
May 23, 2002	Michael Schutte	University of Maine (HE)	multi-year	Free agency	

=== Players lost ===
Date	Player	New team	Via (Note: In parentheses is the player's free agency group on July 1 if applicable.)	Ref
July 1, 2001	Dave MacIntyre (Note: MacIntyre retired.)		Contract expiration (UFA)	
July 1, 2001	Mike Martone (Note: Martone was inactive during the 2001–02 season.)		Contract expiration (UFA)	
July 2, 2001	Jeremy Roenick	Philadelphia Flyers	Free agency (III)	
July 17, 2001	Francois Leroux	Berlin Capitals (DEL)	Free agency (III)	
August 18, 2001	Philippe Audet	AIK IF (SHL)	Free agency (UFA)	
August 21, 2001	Justin Hocking	Manchester Storm (BISL)	Free agency (VI)	
September 24, 2001	Joel Bouchard	New Jersey Devils (Note: Bouchard signed with New Jersey on October 25.)	Release (II)	
September 30, 2001	Eric Healey	Manchester Monarchs (AHL)	Free agency (UFA)	
November 25, 2001	Louie DeBrusk	Quebec Citadelles (AHL)	Free agency (UFA)	
January 16, 2002	Tavis Hansen	Hershey Bears (AHL)	Free agency (VI)	

=== Signings ===
Date	Player	Term	Contract type	Ref
July 3, 2001	Goran Bezina	multi-year	Entry-level	
July 3, 2001	Mike Sullivan	1-year	Re-signing	
July 12, 2001	Peter Fabus	multi-year	Entry-level	
August 1, 2001	Daniel Briere	1-year	Re-signing	
August 1, 2001	Todd Simpson	1-year	Re-signing	
August 1, 2001	Jean-Guy Trudel	1-year	Re-signing	
August 13, 2001	Daymond Langkow	2-year	Arbitration award	
August 17, 2001	Jay Leach	multi-year	Entry-level	
August 20, 2001	Trevor Letowski	1-year	Re-signing	
August 21, 2001	Shane Doan	multi-year	Re-signing	
August 24, 2001	Robert Esche	3-year (Note: Option for a fourth year.)	Re-signing	
September 4, 2001	Erik Westrum	multi-year	Entry-level	
September 8, 2001	Mike Johnson	multi-year	Re-signing	
September 22, 2001	Martin Podlesak	3-year	Entry-level	
October 2, 2001	Krys Kolanos		Entry-level	
March 15, 2002	Brian Savage	4-year	Extension	
March 29, 2002	Andrei Nazarov	3-year	Extension	
April 24, 2002	Jeff Taffe	3-year	Entry-level	
June 5, 2002	Dan Focht	multi-year	Extension	

== Draft picks ==
Phoenix's draft picks at the 2001 NHL entry draft held at the National Car Rental Center in Sunrise, Florida.

Round	#	Player	Nationality	College/Junior/Club team (League)
1	11	Fredrik Sjostrom	Sweden	Frölunda HC (Sweden)
2	31	Matthew Spiller	Canada	Seattle Thunderbirds (WHL)
2	45	Martin Podlesak	Czech Republic	Lethbridge Hurricanes (WHL)
3	78	Beat Forster	Switzerland	HC Davos (Switzerland)
5	148	David Klema	United States	Des Moines Buccaneers (USHL)
6	180	Scott Polaski	United States	Sioux City Musketeers (USHL)
7	210	Steve Belanger	United States	Kamloops Blazers (WHL)
8	243	Frantisek Lukes	Czech Republic	Toronto St. Michael's Majors (OHL)
9	273	Severin Blindenbacher	Switzerland	Kloten Flyers (Switzerland)

== See also ==
- 2001–02 NHL season
