= 2001–02 Vancouver Canucks season =

NHL hockey team season

2001–02 Vancouver Canucks
- Division: 2nd Northwest
- Conference: 8th Western
- 2001–02 record: 42–30–7–3
- Home record: 23–11–5–2
- Road record: 19–19–2–1
- Goals for: 254
- Goals against: 211

Team information
- General manager: Brian Burke
- Coach: Marc Crawford
- Captain: Markus Naslund
- Alternate captains: Murray Baron; Ed Jovanovski; Trent Klatt; Trevor Linden
- Arena: General Motors Place
- Average attendance: 17,712
- Minor league affiliates: Manitoba Moose; Columbia Inferno

Team leaders
- Goals: Markus Naslund (40)
- Assists: Markus Naslund (50)
- Points: Markus Naslund (90)
- Penalty minutes: Matt Cooke (111)
- Plus/minus: Markus Naslund (+22)
- Wins: Dan Cloutier (31)
- Goals against average: Alex Auld (2.00)

The 2001–02 Vancouver Canucks season was the team's 32nd in the National Hockey League (NHL).

== Regular season ==
The Canucks led the NHL in scoring, with 254 goals for.

=== Final standings ===
Northwest Division
| No. | CR | | GP | W | L | T | OTL | GF | GA | Pts |
|---|---|---|---|---|---|---|---|---|---|---|
| 1 | 2 | **Colorado Avalanche** | 82 | 45 | 28 | 8 | 1 | 212 | 169 | 99 |
| 2 | 8 | **Vancouver Canucks** | 82 | 42 | 30 | 7 | 3 | 254 | 211 | 94 |
| 3 | 9 | Edmonton Oilers | 82 | 38 | 28 | 12 | 4 | 205 | 182 | 92 |
| 4 | 11 | Calgary Flames | 82 | 32 | 35 | 12 | 3 | 201 | 220 | 79 |
| 5 | 12 | Minnesota Wild | 82 | 26 | 35 | 12 | 9 | 195 | 238 | 73 |

Note: CR = Conference rank; GP = Games played; W = Wins; L = Losses; T = Ties; OTL = Overtime loss; GF = Goals for; GA = Goals against; Pts = Points
Bolded teams qualified for the playoffs.

Western Conference
| R | | Div | GP | W | L | T | OTL | GF | GA | Pts |
|---|---|---|---|---|---|---|---|---|---|---|
| **1** | **p – Detroit Red Wings** | **CEN** | **82** | **51** | **17** | **10** | **4** | **251** | **187** | **116** |
| **2** | **y – Colorado Avalanche** | **NW** | **82** | **45** | **28** | **8** | **1** | **212** | **169** | **99** |
| **3** | **y – San Jose Sharks** | **PAC** | **82** | **44** | **27** | **8** | **3** | **248** | **199** | **99** |
| **4** | **St. Louis Blues** | **CEN** | **82** | **43** | **27** | **8** | **4** | **227** | **188** | **98** |
| **5** | **Chicago Blackhawks** | **CEN** | **82** | **41** | **27** | **13** | **1** | **216** | **207** | **96** |
| **6** | **Phoenix Coyotes** | **PAC** | **82** | **40** | **27** | **9** | **6** | **228** | **210** | **95** |
| **7** | **Los Angeles Kings** | **PAC** | **82** | **40** | **27** | **11** | **4** | **214** | **190** | **95** |
| **8** | **Vancouver Canucks** | **NW** | **82** | **42** | **30** | **7** | **3** | **254** | **211** | **94** |
8.5
| 9 | Edmonton Oilers | NW | 82 | 38 | 28 | 12 | 4 | 205 | 182 | 92 |
| 10 | Dallas Stars | PAC | 82 | 36 | 28 | 13 | 5 | 215 | 213 | 90 |
| 11 | Calgary Flames | NW | 82 | 32 | 35 | 12 | 3 | 201 | 220 | 79 |
| 12 | Minnesota Wild | NW | 82 | 26 | 35 | 12 | 9 | 195 | 238 | 73 |
| 13 | Mighty Ducks of Anaheim | PAC | 82 | 29 | 42 | 8 | 3 | 175 | 198 | 69 |
| 14 | Nashville Predators | CEN | 82 | 28 | 41 | 13 | 0 | 196 | 230 | 69 |
| 15 | Columbus Blue Jackets | CEN | 82 | 22 | 47 | 8 | 5 | 164 | 255 | 57 |

Divisions: CEN – Central, PAC – Pacific, NW – Northwest

bold – Qualified for playoffs; p – Won Presidents' Trophy; y – Won division

== Playoffs ==
Vancouver won the first two games on the road to go up 2–0 in their first round series against the Presidents' Trophy-winning Detroit Red Wings, but they lost four straight and the series to the eventual Stanley Cup champions.

== Schedule and results ==
=== Regular season ===
2001–02 regular season
October: 4–8–1–0 (home: 3–3–1–0; road: 1–5–0–0)

| Game | Date | Score | Opponent | Record | Recap |
|---|---|---|---|---|---|
| 1 | October 4, 2001 | 4–5 | Chicago Blackhawks (2001–02) | 0–1–0–0 | L |
| 2 | October 6, 2001 | 1–4 | Detroit Red Wings (2001–02) | 0–2–0–0 | L |
| 3 | October 9, 2001 | 4–5 | @ Colorado Avalanche (2001–02) | 0–3–0–0 | L |
| 4 | October 11, 2001 | 4–1 | @ Dallas Stars (2001–02) | 1–3–0–0 | W |
| 5 | October 13, 2001 | 4–0 | Colorado Avalanche (2001–02) | 2–3–0–0 | W |
| 6 | October 16, 2001 | 2–2 OT | Florida Panthers (2001–02) | 2–3–1–0 | T |
| 7 | October 18, 2001 | 5–6 | Toronto Maple Leafs (2001–02) | 2–4–1–0 | L |
| 8 | October 20, 2001 | 2–5 | @ Phoenix Coyotes (2001–02) | 2–5–1–0 | L |
| 9 | October 21, 2001 | 1–3 | @ Mighty Ducks of Anaheim (2001–02) | 2–6–1–0 | L |
| 10 | October 23, 2001 | 4–2 | Nashville Predators (2001–02) | 3–6–1–0 | W |
| 11 | October 25, 2001 | 1–4 | @ Colorado Avalanche (2001–02) | 3–7–1–0 | L |
| 12 | October 27, 2001 | 2–3 | @ Edmonton Oilers (2001–02) | 3–8–1–0 | L |
| 13 | October 30, 2001 | 3–1 | Columbus Blue Jackets (2001–02) | 4–8–1–0 | W |

November: 7–7–2–0 (home: 3–1–1–0; road: 4–6–1–0)

| Game | Date | Score | Opponent | Record | Recap |
|---|---|---|---|---|---|
| 14 | November 1, 2001 | 4–0 | Montreal Canadiens (2001–02) | 5–8–1–0 | W |
| 15 | November 3, 2001 | 1–5 | @ San Jose Sharks (2001–02) | 5–9–1–0 | L |
| 16 | November 6, 2001 | 3–2 | @ Columbus Blue Jackets (2001–02) | 6–9–1–0 | W |
| 17 | November 8, 2001 | 1–3 | @ St. Louis Blues (2001–02) | 6–10–1–0 | L |
| 18 | November 9, 2001 | 1–3 | @ Chicago Blackhawks (2001–02) | 6–11–1–0 | L |
| 19 | November 11, 2001 | 5–0 | @ Minnesota Wild (2001–02) | 7–11–1–0 | W |
| 20 | November 13, 2001 | 3–2 | Chicago Blackhawks (2001–02) | 8–11–1–0 | W |
| 21 | November 15, 2001 | 2–1 | St. Louis Blues (2001–02) | 9–11–1–0 | W |
| 22 | November 17, 2001 | 2–2 OT | Edmonton Oilers (2001–02) | 9–11–2–0 | T |
| 23 | November 20, 2001 | 0–3 | @ Ottawa Senators (2001–02) | 9–12–2–0 | L |
| 24 | November 21, 2001 | 4–1 | @ Pittsburgh Penguins (2001–02) | 10–12–2–0 | W |
| 25 | November 23, 2001 | 2–3 | @ Boston Bruins (2001–02) | 10–13–2–0 | L |
| 26 | November 25, 2001 | 4–1 | @ Philadelphia Flyers (2001–02) | 11–13–2–0 | W |
| 27 | November 27, 2001 | 1–2 | @ Minnesota Wild (2001–02) | 11–14–2–0 | L |
| 28 | November 28, 2001 | 3–3 OT | @ Chicago Blackhawks (2001–02) | 11–14–3–0 | T |
| 29 | November 30, 2001 | 2–5 | Colorado Avalanche (2001–02) | 11–15–3–0 | L |

December: 5–7–1–0 (home: 4–4–1–0; road: 1–3–0–0)

| Game | Date | Score | Opponent | Record | Recap |
|---|---|---|---|---|---|
| 30 | December 2, 2001 | 2–4 | Dallas Stars (2001–02) | 11–16–3–0 | L |
| 31 | December 6, 2001 | 3–2 | Mighty Ducks of Anaheim (2001–02) | 12–16–3–0 | W |
| 32 | December 8, 2001 | 3–5 | San Jose Sharks (2001–02) | 12–17–3–0 | L |
| 33 | December 10, 2001 | 1–1 OT | Tampa Bay Lightning (2001–02) | 12–17–4–0 | T |
| 34 | December 12, 2001 | 1–0 OT | @ Mighty Ducks of Anaheim (2001–02) | 13–17–4–0 | W |
| 35 | December 13, 2001 | 3–6 | @ Los Angeles Kings (2001–02) | 13–18–4–0 | L |
| 36 | December 15, 2001 | 3–0 | Detroit Red Wings (2001–02) | 14–18–4–0 | W |
| 37 | December 19, 2001 | 1–4 | @ Detroit Red Wings (2001–02) | 14–19–4–0 | L |
| 38 | December 20, 2001 | 2–6 | @ Nashville Predators (2001–02) | 14–20–4–0 | L |
| 39 | December 22, 2001 | 1–2 | Minnesota Wild (2001–02) | 14–21–4–0 | L |
| 40 | December 27, 2001 | 4–2 | Calgary Flames (2001–02) | 15–21–4–0 | W |
| 41 | December 29, 2001 | 4–2 | New Jersey Devils (2001–02) | 16–21–4–0 | W |
| 42 | December 31, 2001 | 1–2 | Philadelphia Flyers (2001–02) | 16–22–4–0 | L |

January: 10–2–1–1 (home: 5–0–1–0; road: 5–2–0–1)

| Game | Date | Score | Opponent | Record | Recap |
|---|---|---|---|---|---|
| 43 | January 3, 2002 | 5–2 | Montreal Canadiens (2001–02) | 17–22–4–0 | W |
| 44 | January 5, 2002 | 4–3 | @ Edmonton Oilers (2001–02) | 18–22–4–0 | W |
| 45 | January 8, 2002 | 2–3 | @ Buffalo Sabres (2001–02) | 18–23–4–0 | L |
| 46 | January 9, 2002 | 4–5 OT | @ Detroit Red Wings (2001–02) | 18–23–4–1 | OTL |
| 47 | January 12, 2002 | 7–1 | Carolina Hurricanes (2001–02) | 19–23–4–1 | W |
| 48 | January 15, 2002 | 5–2 | Pittsburgh Penguins (2001–02) | 20–23–4–1 | W |
| 49 | January 17, 2002 | 4–5 | @ St. Louis Blues (2001–02) | 20–24–4–1 | L |
| 50 | January 19, 2002 | 5–1 | @ Washington Capitals (2001–02) | 21–24–4–1 | W |
| 51 | January 21, 2002 | 7–5 | @ Carolina Hurricanes (2001–02) | 22–24–4–1 | W |
| 52 | January 23, 2002 | 4–2 | @ Dallas Stars (2001–02) | 23–24–4–1 | W |
| 53 | January 25, 2002 | 6–1 | Toronto Maple Leafs (2001–02) | 24–24–4–1 | W |
| 54 | January 26, 2002 | 2–0 | @ Calgary Flames (2001–02) | 25–24–4–1 | W |
| 55 | January 28, 2002 | 5–1 | Nashville Predators (2001–02) | 26–24–4–1 | W |
| 56 | January 30, 2002 | 2–2 OT | Edmonton Oilers (2001–02) | 26–24–5–1 | T |

February: 2–1–1–2 (home: 1–1–1–2; road: 1–0–0–0)

| Game | Date | Score | Opponent | Record | Recap |
|---|---|---|---|---|---|
| 57 | February 4, 2002 | 4–2 | Phoenix Coyotes (2001–02) | 27–24–5–1 | W |
| 58 | February 8, 2002 | 4–1 | @ Calgary Flames (2001–02) | 28–24–5–1 | W |
| 59 | February 9, 2002 | 3–4 | Calgary Flames (2001–02) | 28–25–5–1 | L |
| 60 | February 12, 2002 | 1–2 OT | Boston Bruins (2001–02) | 28–25–5–2 | OTL |
| 61 | February 26, 2002 | 4–4 OT | St. Louis Blues (2001–02) | 28–25–6–2 | T |
| 62 | February 28, 2002 | 3–4 OT | Dallas Stars (2001–02) | 28–25–6–3 | OTL |

March: 9–5–0–0 (home: 4–2–0–0; road: 5–3–0–0)

| Game | Date | Score | Opponent | Record | Recap |
|---|---|---|---|---|---|
| 63 | March 2, 2002 | 6–3 | Minnesota Wild (2001–02) | 29–25–6–3 | W |
| 64 | March 7, 2002 | 1–6 | @ Phoenix Coyotes (2001–02) | 29–26–6–3 | L |
| 65 | March 9, 2002 | 0–2 | @ San Jose Sharks (2001–02) | 29–27–6–3 | L |
| 66 | March 10, 2002 | 4–7 | San Jose Sharks (2001–02) | 29–28–6–3 | L |
| 67 | March 12, 2002 | 5–0 | @ Nashville Predators (2001–02) | 30–28–6–3 | W |
| 68 | March 14, 2002 | 5–1 | @ Columbus Blue Jackets (2001–02) | 31–28–6–3 | W |
| 69 | March 16, 2002 | 4–2 | @ Atlanta Thrashers (2001–02) | 32–28–6–3 | W |
| 70 | March 17, 2002 | 3–2 OT | @ New Jersey Devils (2001–02) | 33–28–6–3 | W |
| 71 | March 19, 2002 | 3–1 | @ New York Rangers (2001–02) | 34–28–6–3 | W |
| 72 | March 21, 2002 | 2–3 | @ New York Islanders (2001–02) | 34–29–6–3 | L |
| 73 | March 24, 2002 | 0–2 | Edmonton Oilers (2001–02) | 34–30–6–3 | L |
| 74 | March 26, 2002 | 4–0 | Los Angeles Kings (2001–02) | 35–30–6–3 | W |
| 75 | March 28, 2002 | 4–3 OT | Columbus Blue Jackets (2001–02) | 36–30–6–3 | W |
| 76 | March 30, 2002 | 4–1 | Mighty Ducks of Anaheim (2001–02) | 37–30–6–3 | W |

April: 5–0–1–0 (home: 3–0–0–0; road: 2–0–1–0)

| Game | Date | Score | Opponent | Record | Recap |
|---|---|---|---|---|---|
| 77 | April 2, 2002 | 4–4 OT | @ Los Angeles Kings (2001–02) | 37–30–7–3 | T |
| 78 | April 5, 2002 | 5–4 OT | Minnesota Wild (2001–02) | 38–30–7–3 | W |
| 79 | April 7, 2002 | 4–3 | Phoenix Coyotes (2001–02) | 39–30–7–3 | W |
| 80 | April 9, 2002 | 2–1 | @ Colorado Avalanche (2001–02) | 40–30–7–3 | W |
| 81 | April 11, 2002 | 5–2 | Los Angeles Kings (2001–02) | 41–30–7–3 | W |
| 82 | April 13, 2002 | 4–1 | @ Calgary Flames (2001–02) | 42–30–7–3 | W |

Legend: W Win (2 points) L Loss (0 points) T Tie (1 point) OTL Overtime loss (1 point)

=== Playoffs ===
2002 Stanley Cup playoffs
Western Conference Quarterfinals vs. (1) Detroit Red Wings: Red Wings won 4–2

| Game | Date | Score | Opponent | Attendance | Series | Recap |
|---|---|---|---|---|---|---|
| 1 | April 17, 2002 | 4–3 OT | @ Detroit Red Wings | 20,058 | Canucks lead 1–0 | W |
| 2 | April 19, 2002 | 5–2 | @ Detroit Red Wings | 20,058 | Canucks lead 2–0 | W |
| 3 | April 21, 2002 | 1–3 | Detroit Red Wings | 18,422 | Canucks lead 2–1 | L |
| 4 | April 23, 2002 | 2–4 | Detroit Red Wings | 18,422 | Series tied 2–2 | L |
| 5 | April 25, 2002 | 0–4 | @ Detroit Red Wings | 20,058 | Red Wings lead 3–2 | L |
| 6 | April 27, 2002 | 4–6 | Detroit Red Wings | 18,422 | Red Wings win 4–2 | L |

Legend: W Win L Loss

== Player statistics ==
=== Scoring ===
- Position abbreviations: C = Centre; D = Defence; G = Goaltender; LW = Left wing; RW = Right wing
- † = Joined team via a transaction (e.g., trade, waivers, signing) during the season. Stats reflect time with the Canucks only.
- ‡ = Left team via a transaction (e.g., trade, waivers, release) during the season. Stats reflect time with the Canucks only.

| No. | Player | Pos | Regular season | | | | | | Playoffs | | | | | |
| No. | Player | Pos | GP | G | A | Pts | +/- | PIM | GP | G | A | Pts | +/- | PIM |
|---|---|---|---|---|---|---|---|---|---|---|---|---|---|---|
| 19 | Markus Naslund | LW | 81 | 40 | 50 | 90 | 22 | 50 | 6 | 1 | 1 | 2 | −1 | 2 |
| 44 | Todd Bertuzzi | RW | 72 | 36 | 49 | 85 | 21 | 110 | 6 | 2 | 2 | 4 | −1 | 14 |
| 7 | Brendan Morrison | C | 82 | 23 | 44 | 67 | 18 | 26 | 6 | 0 | 2 | 2 | −2 | 6 |
| 25 | Andrew Cassels | C | 53 | 11 | 39 | 50 | 5 | 22 | 6 | 2 | 1 | 3 | −4 | 0 |
| 55 | Ed Jovanovski | D | 82 | 17 | 31 | 48 | −7 | 101 | 6 | 1 | 4 | 5 | 1 | 8 |
| 33 | Henrik Sedin | C | 82 | 16 | 20 | 36 | 9 | 36 | 6 | 3 | 0 | 3 | 0 | 0 |
| 2 | Mattias Ohlund | D | 81 | 10 | 26 | 36 | 16 | 56 | 6 | 1 | 1 | 2 | −3 | 6 |
| 16 | Trevor Linden† | C | 64 | 12 | 22 | 34 | −3 | 65 | 6 | 1 | 4 | 5 | 1 | 0 |
| 24 | Matt Cooke | LW | 82 | 13 | 20 | 33 | 4 | 111 | 6 | 3 | 2 | 5 | 3 | 0 |
| 22 | Daniel Sedin | LW | 79 | 9 | 23 | 32 | 1 | 32 | 6 | 0 | 1 | 1 | 0 | 0 |
| 3 | Brent Sopel | D | 66 | 8 | 17 | 25 | 21 | 44 | 6 | 0 | 2 | 2 | −1 | 2 |
| 17 | Jan Hlavac† | LW | 46 | 9 | 12 | 21 | 4 | 10 | 5 | 0 | 1 | 1 | −3 | 0 |
| 10 | Trevor Letowski† | RW | 42 | 7 | 10 | 17 | 2 | 15 | 6 | 0 | 1 | 1 | −2 | 8 |
| 26 | Trent Klatt | RW | 34 | 8 | 7 | 15 | 9 | 10 | — | — | — | — | — | — |
| 8 | Donald Brashear‡ | LW | 31 | 5 | 8 | 13 | −8 | 90 | — | — | — | — | — | — |
| 14 | Scott Lachance | D | 81 | 1 | 10 | 11 | 15 | 50 | 6 | 1 | 1 | 2 | 2 | 4 |
| 13 | Artem Chubarov | C | 51 | 5 | 5 | 10 | −3 | 10 | 6 | 0 | 1 | 1 | 0 | 0 |
| 28 | Bryan Helmer | D | 40 | 5 | 5 | 10 | 10 | 53 | 6 | 0 | 0 | 0 | −1 | 0 |
| 37 | Jarkko Ruutu | RW | 49 | 2 | 7 | 9 | −1 | 74 | 1 | 0 | 0 | 0 | −1 | 0 |
| 9 | Harold Druken | LW | 27 | 4 | 4 | 8 | −1 | 6 | — | — | — | — | — | — |
| 4 | Justin Kurtz† | D | 27 | 3 | 5 | 8 | −4 | 14 | — | — | — | — | — | — |
| 23 | Murray Baron | D | 61 | 1 | 6 | 7 | 8 | 68 | 6 | 0 | 1 | 1 | −3 | 10 |
| 34 | Jason Strudwick | D | 44 | 2 | 4 | 6 | 4 | 96 | — | — | — | — | — | — |
| 15 | Todd Warriner† | LW | 14 | 2 | 4 | 6 | 4 | 12 | 6 | 1 | 0 | 1 | 0 | 2 |
| 20 | Denis Pederson‡ | RW | 29 | 1 | 5 | 6 | −2 | 31 | — | — | — | — | — | — |
| 29 | Herbert Vasiljevs | C | 18 | 3 | 2 | 5 | 0 | 2 | — | — | — | — | — | — |
| 15 | Drake Berehowsky‡ | D | 25 | 1 | 2 | 3 | −5 | 18 | — | — | — | — | — | — |
| 35 | Alex Auld | G | 1 | 0 | 1 | 1 | | 0 | — | — | — | — | — | — |
| 18 | Steve Kariya | LW | 3 | 0 | 1 | 1 | −2 | 2 | — | — | — | — | — | — |
| 5 | Bryan Allen | D | 11 | 0 | 0 | 0 | 1 | 6 | — | — | — | — | — | — |
| 30 | Martin Brochu | G | 6 | 0 | 0 | 0 | | 0 | — | — | — | — | — | — |
| 27 | Mike Brown | LW | 15 | 0 | 0 | 0 | 1 | 72 | — | — | — | — | — | — |
| 39 | Dan Cloutier | G | 62 | 0 | 0 | 0 | | 20 | 6 | 0 | 0 | 0 | | 0 |
| 38 | Brad Leeb | RW | 2 | 0 | 0 | 0 | 1 | 0 | — | — | — | — | — | — |
| 1 | Peter Skudra† | G | 23 | 0 | 0 | 0 | | 2 | 2 | 0 | 0 | 0 | | 0 |
| 6 | Alexei Tezikov† | D | 2 | 0 | 0 | 0 | 2 | 0 | — | — | — | — | — | — |

=== Goaltending ===
- † = Joined team via a transaction (e.g., trade, waivers, signing) during the season. Stats reflect time with the Canucks only.

| No. | Player | Regular season | | | | | | | | | | Playoffs | | | | | | | | |
| No. | Player | GP | W | L | T | SA | GA | GAA | SV% | SO | TOI | GP | W | L | SA | GA | GAA | SV% | SO | TOI |
|---|---|---|---|---|---|---|---|---|---|---|---|---|---|---|---|---|---|---|---|---|
| 39 | Dan Cloutier | 62 | 31 | 22 | 5 | 1440 | 142 | 2.43 | .901 | 7 | 3502 | 6 | 2 | 3 | 123 | 16 | 3.51 | .870 | 0 | 273 |
| 1 | Peter Skudra† | 23 | 10 | 8 | 2 | 508 | 47 | 2.42 | .907 | 1 | 1166 | 2 | 0 | 1 | 46 | 5 | 3.13 | .891 | 0 | 96 |
| 35 | Alex Auld | 1 | 1 | 0 | 0 | 22 | 2 | 2.00 | .909 | 0 | 60 | — | — | — | — | — | — | — | — | — |
| 30 | Martin Brochu | 6 | 0 | 3 | 0 | 104 | 15 | 4.16 | .856 | 0 | 216 | — | — | — | — | — | — | — | — | — |

== Awards and records ==
=== Awards ===
| Type | Award/honour | Recipient | Ref |
|---|---|---|---|
| League (annual) | NHL First All-Star Team | Markus Naslund (Left wing) | |
| League (in-season) | NHL All-Star Game selection | Ed Jovanovski | |
| League (in-season) | NHL All-Star Game selection | Markus Naslund | |
| League (in-season) | NHL Player of the Month | Markus Naslund (January) | |
| League (in-season) | NHL Player of the Week | Brent Sopel (January 28) | |
| League (in-season) | NHL Player of the Week | Dan Cloutier (March 18) | |
| Team | Babe Pratt Trophy | Ed Jovanovski | |
| Team | Cyclone Taylor Trophy | Markus Naslund | |
| Team | Cyrus H. McLean Trophy | Markus Naslund | |
| Team | Fred J. Hume Award | Scott Lachance | |
| Team | Molson Cup | Markus Naslund | |
| Team | Most Exciting Player Award | Todd Bertuzzi | |

=== Milestones ===
| Milestone | Player | Date | Ref |
|---|---|---|---|
| First game | Justin Kurtz | October 23, 2001 | |
| First game | Alex Auld | January 23, 2002 | |
| 1,000th game played | Trevor Linden | March 26, 2002 | |

== Transactions ==
The Canucks were involved in the following transactions from June 10, 2001, the day after the deciding game of the 2001 Stanley Cup Final, through June 13, 2002, the day of the deciding game of the 2002 Stanley Cup Final.

=== Trades ===
| Date | Details | | Ref |
|---|---|---|---|
| November 10, 2001 | To Vancouver Canucks: Trevor Linden; 2nd-round pick in 2002 or 2003 | To Washington Capitals: 1st-round pick in 2002; 3rd-round pick in 2003 | |
| December 17, 2001 | To Vancouver Canucks: Jan Hlavac; Tampa Bay’s 3rd-round pick in 2002 | To Philadelphia Flyers: Donald Brashear; 6th-round pick in 2002 | |
| December 28, 2001 | To Vancouver Canucks: Tyler Bouck; Trevor Letowski; Todd Warriner; 3rd-round pick in 2003 | To Phoenix Coyotes: Drake Berehowsky; Denis Pederson | |

=== Players acquired ===
| Date | Player | Former team | Term | Via | Ref |
|---|---|---|---|---|---|
| August 2, 2001 | Andre Savage | Boston Bruins | | Free agency | |
| August 10, 2001 | Herbert Vasiljevs | Atlanta Thrashers | | Free agency | |
| September 28, 2001 | Martin Brochu | Minnesota Wild | | Waiver draft | |
| October 15, 2001 | Justin Kurtz | Manitoba Moose (AHL) | | Free agency | |
| October 25, 2001 | Josh Holden | Carolina Hurricanes | | Waivers | |
| October 30, 2001 | Alexei Tezikov | Anaheim Mighty Ducks | | Waivers | |
| November 7, 2001 | Peter Skudra | Hartford Wolf Pack (AHL) | | Free agency | |

=== Players lost ===
| Date | Player | New team | Via (Note: In parentheses is the player's free agency group on July 1 if applicable.) | Ref |
|---|---|---|---|---|
| N/A | Vadim Sharifijanov | HC Lada Togliatti (RSL) | Free agency (II) (Note: Vancouver retained Sharifijanov’s NHL rights through the 2005–06 season.) | |
| N/A | Sean Tallaire | Iserlohn Roosters (DEL) | Free agency (UFA) | |
| June 26, 2001 | Mike Stapleton | Espoo Blues (Liiga) (Note: Stapleton signed with Espoo on October 23.) | Buyout | |
| July 1, 2001 | Larry Shapley (Note: Shapley, who last played during the 1999–2000 season, retired.) | | Contract expiration (UFA) | |
| July 17, 2001 | Greg Hawgood | Dallas Stars | Free agency (III) | |
| July 20, 2001 | Johan Davidsson | HV71 (SHL) | Free agency (II) (Note: Vancouver retained Davidsson’s NHL rights through the 2005–06 season.) | |
| August 3, 2001 | Bob Essensa | Buffalo Sabres | Free agency (III) | |
| August 28, 2001 | Dody Wood | Ayr Scottish Eagles (BISL) | Free agency (UFA) | |
| September 4, 2001 | Clint Cabana | San Diego Gulls (WCHL) | Free agency (UFA) | |
| September 28, 2001 | Josh Holden | Carolina Hurricanes | Waiver draft | |
| October 1, 2001 | Corey Schwab | Toronto Maple Leafs | Free agency (UFA) | |
| October 18, 2001 | Peter Schaefer | HC TPS (Liiga) | Free agency (II) (Note: Vancouver retained Schaefer’s NHL rights until trading them to the Ottawa Senators on September 21, 2002.) | |

=== Signings ===
| Date | Player | Term | Contract type | Ref |
|---|---|---|---|---|
| June 28, 2001 | Markus Naslund | 3-year | Extension | |
| July 18, 2001 | Murray Baron | 2-year | Re-signing | |
| July 18, 2001 | Dan Cloutier | | Re-signing | |
| July 20, 2001 | Drake Berehowsky | | Re-signing | |
| July 27, 2001 | Todd Bertuzzi | | Re-signing | |
| July 31, 2001 | Josh Holden | | Re-signing | |
| July 31, 2001 | Denis Pederson | | Re-signing | |
| August 17, 2001 | Brandon Reid | | Entry-level | |
| August 22, 2001 | Matt Cooke | 4-year | Re-signing | |
| August 28, 2001 | Zenith Komarniski | | Re-signing | |
| August 28, 2001 | Justin Morrison | | Entry-level | |
| August 29, 2001 | Alfie Michaud | | Re-signing | |
| September 18, 2001 | Brent Sopel | 3-year | Re-signing | |
| September 26, 2001 | Bryan Helmer | | Re-signing | |
| October 5, 2001 | Mattias Ohlund | | Extension | |
| October 11, 2001 | Fedor Fedorov | | Entry-level | |
| October 11, 2001 | Denis Martynyuk | | Entry-level | |
| May 31, 2002 | Nathan Smith | | Entry-level | |

== Draft picks ==
Vancouver's draft picks at the 2001 NHL entry draft held at the National Car Rental Center in Sunrise, Florida.

| Round | # | Player | Nationality | College/Junior/Club team (League) |
|---|---|---|---|---|
| 1 | 16 | R. J. Umberger | United States | Ohio State University (CCHA) |
| 3 | 66 | Fedor Fedorov | Russia | Sudbury Wolves (OHL) |
| 4 | 114 | Evgeny Gladskikh | Russia | Metallurg Magnitogorsk (Russia) |
| 5 | 151 | Kevin Bieksa | Canada | Bowling Green University (CCHA) |
| 7 | 212 | Jason King | Canada | Halifax Mooseheads (QMJHL) |
| 8 | 245 | Konstantin Mikhailov | Russia | Nizhnekamsk Neftekhimik (Russia) |

== See also ==
- 2001–02 NHL season
