= Trevor Letowski =

Canadian ice hockey player and coach

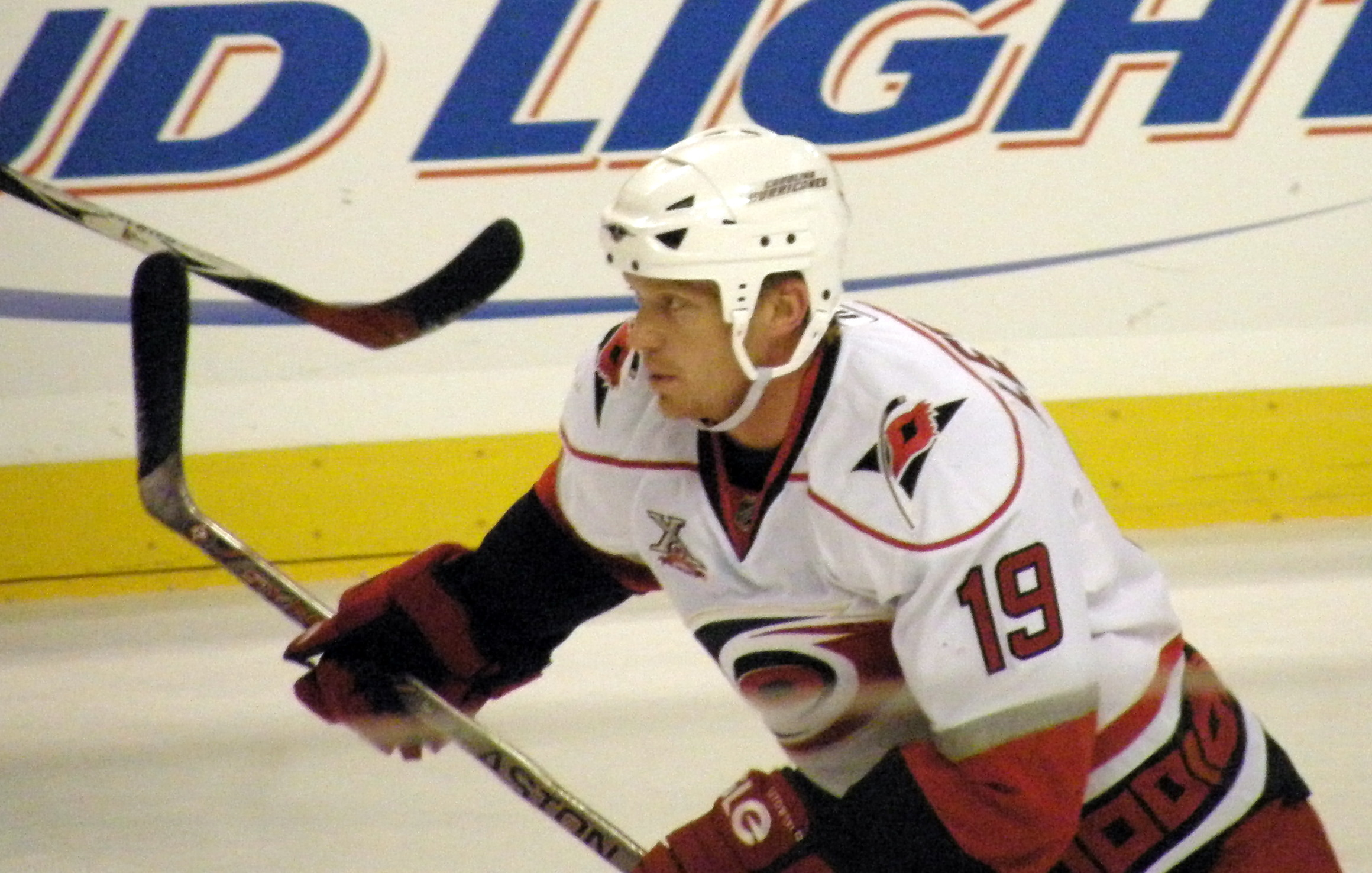
- Born: April 5, 1977 (age 49) Thunder Bay, Ontario, Canada
- Height: 5 ft 10 in (178 cm)
- Weight: 180 lb (82 kg; 12 st 12 lb)
- Position: Right wing
- Shot: Right
- Played for: Phoenix Coyotes; Vancouver Canucks; Columbus Blue Jackets; Carolina Hurricanes; HC Fribourg-Gottéron; Barys Astana
- National team: Canada
- NHL draft: 174th overall, 1996; Phoenix Coyotes
- Playing career: 1997–2010

Trevor Letowski (born April 5, 1977) is a Canadian former professional ice hockey winger. He was selected in the seventh round, 174th overall, by the Phoenix Coyotes in the 1996 NHL entry draft. Letowski also played for the Vancouver Canucks, Columbus Blue Jackets, and Carolina Hurricanes. Following retirement from active play, he served as head coach of the Sarnia Sting and Windsor Spitfires in the Ontario Hockey League (OHL) as well as an assistant coach with the Montreal Canadiens in the National Hockey League (NHL).

== Playing career ==
Letowski began his career playing major junior for the Sarnia Sting of the Ontario Hockey League (OHL) where he was named as his team's Rookie of the Year for their 1994–95 season. He was then selected in the seventh round, 174th overall, by the Phoenix Coyotes in the 1996 NHL entry draft.

After his third and final OHL season with the Sting, Letowski spent the 1997–98 season with the Springfield Falcons, American Hockey League (AHL) affiliate of the Coyotes. He made his NHL debut during the 1998–99 season and became a regular in the Coyotes lineup, playing two full seasons thereafter. Midway through the 2001–02 season, Letowski was traded by the Coyotes, along with Todd Warriner and Tyler Bouck, to the Vancouver Canucks in exchange for Drake Berehowsky and Denis Pederson on December 28, 2001.

Letowski was signed by the Columbus Blue Jackets as a unrestricted free agent on July 3, 2003, and played two seasons for the Jackets split by a term in Switzerland with HC Fribourg-Gottéron of the Swiss Nationalliga A during the 2004–05 NHL lockout. He then joined the Carolina Hurricanes as a free agent on July 6, 2006 and played there for two seasons.

During a game against the Pittsburgh Penguins on October 14, 2006, Letowski was hit by the Penguins' Colby Armstrong following a pass in the Penguins' zone and was knocked unconscious and removed from the ice on a stretcher; there was no penalty assessed on the play.

In August 2008, Letowski joined Kazakhstani-based club Barys Astana of the Kontinental Hockey League (KHL) as a free agent. Following the conclusion of the 2009–10 season, he announced his retirement from active play.

== International play ==
Medal record

Representing Canada

Ice hockey

World Junior Championships
Gold medal – first place	1997 Geneva	

Letowski won a gold medal with Team Canada at the 1997 World Junior Ice Hockey Championships held in Geneva, Switzerland.

== Coaching career ==
Letwoski returned to where he began his playing career taking up an assistant coaching role with the Sarnia Sting on April 17, 2010 for the 2010–11 season. However, on February 6, 2011, Dave MacQueen was fired as head coach and GM whereas Letowski took over serving as interim head coach. In 18 games as head coach, the Sting went 7–10–1, and ultimately missed the playoffs for the second straight season. He returned to his assistant position under the Sting's next head coach, Jacques Beaulieu, in 2011–12 before being promoted to head coach on June 14, 2013.

On July 9, 2015, Letowski was hired by the Windsor Spitfires as their assistant coach, after previous assistant coach Bob Jones was hired by the Oshawa Generals. After two seasons, he was promoted to head coach of the Spitfires in 2017 when Rocky Thompson left to become the head coach of the Chicago Wolves in the American Hockey League (AHL).

In July 2021, Letowski was hired by the Montreal Canadiens of the National Hockey League (NHL) as an assistant coach. Following five seasons with the Canadiens organization, it was announced that he had stepped away from his role in July 2026.

== Career statistics ==
=== Regular season and playoffs ===
			Regular season					Playoffs
Season	Team	League	GP	G	A	Pts	PIM	GP	G	A	Pts	PIM
1994–95	Sarnia Sting	OHL	66	22	19	41	33	4	0	1	1	9
1995–96	Sarnia Sting	OHL	66	36	63	99	66	10	9	5	14	10
1996–97	Sarnia Sting	OHL	55	35	73	108	51	12	9	12	21	20
1997–98	Springfield Falcons	AHL	75	11	20	31	26	4	1	0	1	2
1998–99	Phoenix Coyotes	NHL	14	2	2	4	2	—	—	—	—	—
1998–99	Springfield Falcons	AHL	67	32	35	67	46	3	1	0	1	2
1999–2000	Phoenix Coyotes	NHL	82	19	20	39	20	5	1	1	2	4
2000–01	Phoenix Coyotes	NHL	77	7	15	22	32	—	—	—	—	—
2001–02	Phoenix Coyotes	NHL	33	2	6	8	4	—	—	—	—	—
2001–02	Vancouver Canucks	NHL	42	7	10	17	15	6	0	1	1	8
2002–03	Vancouver Canucks	NHL	78	11	14	25	36	6	0	1	1	0
2003–04	Columbus Blue Jackets	NHL	73	15	17	32	16	—	—	—	—	—
2004–05	HC Fribourg-Gottéron	NLA	9	5	4	9	6	—	—	—	—	—
2005–06	Columbus Blue Jackets	NHL	81	10	18	28	36	—	—	—	—	—
2006–07	Carolina Hurricanes	NHL	61	2	6	8	18	—	—	—	—	—
2007–08	Carolina Hurricanes	NHL	75	9	9	18	30	—	—	—	—	—
2008–09	Barys Astana	KHL	37	7	7	14	30	3	1	0	1	2
2009–10	Barys Astana	KHL	54	3	10	13	24	3	0	0	0	0
NHL totals			616	84	117	201	209	17	1	3	4	12
KHL totals			91	10	17	27	54	6	1	0	1	2

=== International ===
Year	Team	Event	Result	GP	G	A	Pts	PIM
1997	Canada	WJC	1st place, gold medalist(s)	7	2	1	3	4
2000	Canada	WC	4th	9	0	2	2	6
Junior totals				7	2	1	3	4
Senior totals				9	0	2	2	6

== Head coaching record ==
Team	Year	Regular season						Post season
Team	Year	G	W	L	OTL	Pts	Finish	Result
SAR	2010–11	18	7	10	1	(57)	4th in West	Missed playoffs
SAR	2013–14	68	17	44	7	41	5th in West	Missed playoffs
SAR	2014–15	68	29	32	7	65	2nd in West	Lost in First Round
WSR	2017–18	68	32	30	6	70	3rd in West	Lost in First Round
WSR	2018–19	68	25	33	10	60	4th in West	Lost in First Round
WSR	2019–20	62	34	20	8	76	3rd in West	No playoffs held
