= 2001–02 Colorado Avalanche season =

National Hockey League team season

2001–02 Colorado Avalanche
- Northwest Division champions
- Division: 1st Northwest
- Conference: 2nd Western
- 2001–02 record: 45–28–8–1
- Home record: 24–12–4–1
- Road record: 21–16–4–0
- Goals for: 212
- Goals against: 169

Team information
- General manager: Pierre Lacroix
- Coach: Bob Hartley
- Captain: Joe Sakic
- Alternate captains: Rob Blake; Chris Drury; Adam Foote
- Arena: Pepsi Center
- Average attendance: 18,007
- Minor league affiliate: Hershey Bears

Team leaders
- Goals: Joe Sakic (26)
- Assists: Joe Sakic (53)
- Points: Joe Sakic (79)
- Penalty minutes: Scott Parker (154)
- Plus/minus: Greg de Vries (+18)
- Wins: Patrick Roy (32)
- Goals against average: David Aebischer (1.88)

The 2001–02 Colorado Avalanche season was the Avalanche's seventh season. At the end of the regular season, Patrick Roy had a goals against average (GAA) of 1.94 and a save percentage of .925. For his efforts, Roy earned the William M. Jennings Trophy and was a First Team All-Star for the fourth time in his career. The Avalanche beat the Los Angeles Kings in the first round in seven games, then San Jose in the second round in seven games, but lost to the higher-seeded Detroit Red Wings in seven games after being up 3–2 in the series and lost game 7, 7–0, against Detroit, the eventual Stanley Cup champions. Until the 2021–22 season, this remained the last season in which the Avalanche made it past the second round of the playoffs, and in advance, played in the Western Conference Finals. This also remains the last season the Avalanche would win a Game 7 of a playoff series.

== Regular season ==
- December 26, 2001: In a 2–0 shutout over the Dallas Stars, Patrick Roy became the first goalie to win 500 games in a career.

The Avalanche finished the regular season first overall in goaltending, having allowed 169 goals. They also led the league in shutouts, with 11. Combined with the 10 games in which the team itself was shut out, 21 of the Avalanche's 82 regular-season games ended in a shutout.

=== Final standings ===
Northwest Division
No.	CR		GP	W	L	T	OTL	GF	GA	Pts
1	2	**Colorado Avalanche**	82	45	28	8	1	212	169	99
2	8	**Vancouver Canucks**	82	42	30	7	3	254	211	94
3	9	Edmonton Oilers	82	38	28	12	4	205	182	92
4	11	Calgary Flames	82	32	35	12	3	201	220	79
5	12	Minnesota Wild	82	26	35	12	9	195	238	73

Note: CR = Conference rank; GP = Games played; W = Wins; L = Losses; T = Ties; OTL = Overtime loss; GF = Goals for; GA = Goals against; Pts = Points
Bolded teams qualified for the playoffs.

Western Conference
R		Div	GP	W	L	T	OTL	GF	GA	Pts
**1**	**p – Detroit Red Wings**	**CEN**	**82**	**51**	**17**	**10**	**4**	**251**	**187**	**116**
**2**	**y – Colorado Avalanche**	**NW**	**82**	**45**	**28**	**8**	**1**	**212**	**169**	**99**
**3**	**y – San Jose Sharks**	**PAC**	**82**	**44**	**27**	**8**	**3**	**248**	**199**	**99**
**4**	**St. Louis Blues**	**CEN**	**82**	**43**	**27**	**8**	**4**	**227**	**188**	**98**
**5**	**Chicago Blackhawks**	**CEN**	**82**	**41**	**27**	**13**	**1**	**216**	**207**	**96**
**6**	**Phoenix Coyotes**	**PAC**	**82**	**40**	**27**	**9**	**6**	**228**	**210**	**95**
**7**	**Los Angeles Kings**	**PAC**	**82**	**40**	**27**	**11**	**4**	**214**	**190**	**95**
**8**	**Vancouver Canucks**	**NW**	**82**	**42**	**30**	**7**	**3**	**254**	**211**	**94**
8.5
9	Edmonton Oilers	NW	82	38	28	12	4	205	182	92
10	Dallas Stars	PAC	82	36	28	13	5	215	213	90
11	Calgary Flames	NW	82	32	35	12	3	201	220	79
12	Minnesota Wild	NW	82	26	35	12	9	195	238	73
13	Mighty Ducks of Anaheim	PAC	82	29	42	8	3	175	198	69
14	Nashville Predators	CEN	82	28	41	13	0	196	230	69
15	Columbus Blue Jackets	CEN	82	22	47	8	5	164	255	57

Divisions: CEN – Central, PAC – Pacific, NW – Northwest

bold – Qualified for playoffs; p – Won Presidents' Trophy; y – Won division

== Schedule and results ==
=== Regular season ===
2001–02 regular season
October: 7–6–0–0 (home: 4–2–0–0; road: 3–4–0–0)

Game	Date	Score	Opponent	Record	Recap
1	October 3, 2001	3–1	@ Pittsburgh Penguins (2001–02)	1–0–0–0	W
2	October 9, 2001	5–4	Vancouver Canucks (2001–02)	2–0–0–0	W
3	October 11, 2001	3–5	@ Edmonton Oilers (2001–02)	2–1–0–0	L
4	October 13, 2001	0–4	@ Vancouver Canucks (2001–02)	2–2–0–0	L
5	October 16, 2001	2–1	Tampa Bay Lightning (2001–02)	3–2–0–0	W
6	October 18, 2001	1–4	Edmonton Oilers (2001–02)	3–3–0–0	L
7	October 20, 2001	5–0	@ Columbus Blue Jackets (2001–02)	4–3–0–0	W
8	October 21, 2001	2–4	@ Chicago Blackhawks (2001–02)	4–4–0–0	L
9	October 23, 2001	5–1	Carolina Hurricanes (2001–02)	5–4–0–0	W
10	October 25, 2001	4–1	Vancouver Canucks (2001–02)	6–4–0–0	W
11	October 27, 2001	0–1	@ Phoenix Coyotes (2001–02)	6–5–0–0	L
12	October 28, 2001	3–2	@ Mighty Ducks of Anaheim (2001–02)	7–5–0–0	W
13	October 31, 2001	0–1	St. Louis Blues (2001–02)	7–6–0–0	L

November: 6–6–1–0 (home: 4–0–0–0; road: 2–6–1–0)

Game	Date	Score	Opponent	Record	Recap
14	November 2, 2001	2–4	@ Minnesota Wild (2001–02)	7–7–0–0	L
15	November 3, 2001	1–4	@ Toronto Maple Leafs (2001–02)	7–8–0–0	L
16	November 6, 2001	1–1 OT	@ Montreal Canadiens (2001–02)	7–8–1–0	T
17	November 8, 2001	0–1	@ Ottawa Senators (2001–02)	7–9–1–0	L
18	November 10, 2001	0–2	@ Calgary Flames (2001–02)	7–10–1–0	L
19	November 14, 2001	1–0	Minnesota Wild (2001–02)	8–10–1–0	W
20	November 16, 2001	1–0	New York Islanders (2001–02)	9–10–1–0	W
21	November 18, 2001	2–0	@ New Jersey Devils (2001–02)	10–10–1–0	W
22	November 20, 2001	3–5	@ New York Rangers (2001–02)	10–11–1–0	L
23	November 21, 2001	4–5	@ New York Islanders (2001–02)	10–12–1–0	L
24	November 24, 2001	2–0	Edmonton Oilers (2001–02)	11–12–1–0	W
25	November 27, 2001	4–1	Florida Panthers (2001–02)	12–12–1–0	W
26	November 30, 2001	5–2	@ Vancouver Canucks (2001–02)	13–12–1–0	W

December: 9–3–3–0 (home: 4–2–2–0; road: 5–1–1–0)

Game	Date	Score	Opponent	Record	Recap
27	December 1, 2001	2–2 OT	@ Calgary Flames (2001–02)	13–12–2–0	T
28	December 3, 2001	4–2	Ottawa Senators (2001–02)	14–12–2–0	W
29	December 5, 2001	4–1	@ Detroit Red Wings (2001–02)	15–12–2–0	W
30	December 7, 2001	4–1	@ Buffalo Sabres (2001–02)	16–12–2–0	W
31	December 8, 2001	2–0	@ Columbus Blue Jackets (2001–02)	17–12–2–0	W
32	December 10, 2001	1–1 OT	Mighty Ducks of Anaheim (2001–02)	17–12–3–0	T
33	December 12, 2001	5–1	Columbus Blue Jackets (2001–02)	18–12–3–0	W
34	December 14, 2001	0–3	San Jose Sharks (2001–02)	18–13–3–0	L
35	December 16, 2001	3–2 OT	@ Minnesota Wild (2001–02)	19–13–3–0	W
36	December 19, 2001	2–1	Mighty Ducks of Anaheim (2001–02)	20–13–3–0	W
37	December 21, 2001	2–2 OT	Calgary Flames (2001–02)	20–13–4–0	T
38	December 23, 2001	6–3	Minnesota Wild (2001–02)	21–13–4–0	W
39	December 26, 2001	2–0	@ Dallas Stars (2001–02)	22–13–4–0	W
40	December 27, 2001	1–3	@ Chicago Blackhawks (2001–02)	22–14–4–0	L
41	December 29, 2001	2–5	Philadelphia Flyers (2001–02)	22–15–4–0	L

January: 8–3–2–1 (home: 4–2–0–1; road: 4–1–2–0)

Game	Date	Score	Opponent	Record	Recap
42	January 1, 2002	4–4 OT	@ Nashville Predators (2001–02)	22–15–5–0	T
43	January 3, 2002	3–2 OT	New York Rangers (2001–02)	23–15–5–0	W
44	January 5, 2002	1–3	@ Detroit Red Wings (2001–02)	23–16–5–0	L
45	January 9, 2002	7–3	Chicago Blackhawks (2001–02)	24–16–5–0	W
46	January 12, 2002	2–2 OT	@ Edmonton Oilers (2001–02)	24–16–6–0	T
47	January 15, 2002	0–1 OT	San Jose Sharks (2001–02)	24–16–6–1	OTL
48	January 17, 2002	3–2 OT	Phoenix Coyotes (2001–02)	25–16–6–1	W
49	January 19, 2002	3–1	@ San Jose Sharks (2001–02)	26–16–6–1	W
50	January 21, 2002	3–2	Buffalo Sabres (2001–02)	27–16–6–1	W
51	January 23, 2002	4–2	@ Edmonton Oilers (2001–02)	28–16–6–1	W
52	January 24, 2002	2–0	@ Calgary Flames (2001–02)	29–16–6–1	W
53	January 26, 2002	4–2	@ Los Angeles Kings (2001–02)	30–16–6–1	W
54	January 28, 2002	4–6	Los Angeles Kings (2001–02)	30–17–6–1	L
55	January 30, 2002	2–5	Nashville Predators (2001–02)	30–18–6–1	L

February: 4–2–1–0 (home: 3–2–1–0; road: 1–0–0–0)

Game	Date	Score	Opponent	Record	Recap
56	February 4, 2002	1–3	Detroit Red Wings (2001–02)	30–19–6–1	L
57	February 8, 2002	6–0	@ Minnesota Wild (2001–02)	31–19–6–1	W
58	February 9, 2002	2–3	Chicago Blackhawks (2001–02)	31–20–6–1	L
59	February 11, 2002	5–2	Boston Bruins (2001–02)	32–20–6–1	W
60	February 13, 2002	3–1	St. Louis Blues (2001–02)	33–20–6–1	W
61	February 26, 2002	2–2 OT	Calgary Flames (2001–02)	33–20–7–1	T
62	February 28, 2002	2–1 OT	Phoenix Coyotes (2001–02)	34–20–7–1	W

March: 7–6–0–0 (home: 3–3–0–0; road: 4–3–0–0)

Game	Date	Score	Opponent	Record	Recap
63	March 2, 2002	1–2	Dallas Stars (2001–02)	34–21–7–1	L
64	March 4, 2002	2–0	New Jersey Devils (2001–02)	35–21–7–1	W
65	March 6, 2002	4–1	Columbus Blue Jackets (2001–02)	36–21–7–1	W
66	March 9, 2002	4–3	Los Angeles Kings (2001–02)	37–21–7–1	W
67	March 11, 2002	3–2	@ St. Louis Blues (2001–02)	38–21–7–1	W
68	March 14, 2002	0–2	@ Atlanta Thrashers (2001–02)	38–22–7–1	L
69	March 16, 2002	2–1	@ Philadelphia Flyers (2001–02)	39–22–7–1	W
70	March 17, 2002	5–4	@ Nashville Predators (2001–02)	40–22–7–1	W
71	March 19, 2002	0–3	Washington Capitals (2001–02)	40–23–7–1	L
72	March 21, 2002	1–3	@ Los Angeles Kings (2001–02)	40–24–7–1	L
73	March 23, 2002	0–2	Detroit Red Wings (2001–02)	40–25–7–1	L
74	March 28, 2002	3–2	@ San Jose Sharks (2001–02)	41–25–7–1	W
75	March 30, 2002	3–5	@ Phoenix Coyotes (2001–02)	41–26–7–1	L

April: 4–2–1–0 (home: 2–1–1–0; road: 2–1–0–0)

Game	Date	Score	Opponent	Record	Recap
76	April 1, 2002	5–1	Nashville Predators (2001–02)	42–26–7–1	W
77	April 3, 2002	6–0	Atlanta Thrashers (2001–02)	43–26–7–1	W
78	April 5, 2002	1–3	@ Dallas Stars (2001–02)	43–27–7–1	L
79	April 7, 2002	4–2	@ St. Louis Blues (2001–02)	44–27–7–1	W
80	April 9, 2002	1–2	Vancouver Canucks (2001–02)	44–28–7–1	L
81	April 12, 2002	3–1	@ Mighty Ducks of Anaheim (2001–02)	45–28–7–1	W
82	April 14, 2002	2–2 OT	Dallas Stars (2001–02)	45–28–8–1	T

Legend: W Win (2 points) L Loss (0 points) T Tie (1 point) OTL Overtime loss (1 point)

=== Playoffs ===
2002 Stanley Cup playoffs
Western Conference Quarterfinals vs. (7) Los Angeles Kings – Avalanche win 4–3

Game	Date	Score	Opponent	Series	Recap
1	April 18, 2002	4–3	Los Angeles Kings	Avalanche lead 1–0	W
2	April 20, 2002	5–3	Los Angeles Kings	Avalanche lead 2–0	W
3	April 22, 2002	1–3	@ Los Angeles Kings	Avalanche lead 2–1	L
4	April 23, 2002	1–0	@ Los Angeles Kings	Avalanche lead 3–1	W
5	April 25, 2002	0–1 OT	Los Angeles Kings	Avalanche lead 3–2	L
6	April 27, 2002	1–3	@ Los Angeles Kings	Series tied 3–3	L
7	April 29, 2002	4–0	Los Angeles Kings	Avalanche win 4–3	W

Western Conference Semifinals vs. (3) San Jose Sharks – Avalanche win 4–3

Game	Date	Score	Opponent	Series	Recap
1	May 1, 2002	3–6	San Jose Sharks	Sharks lead 1–0	L
2	May 4, 2002	8–2	San Jose Sharks	Series tied 1–1	W
3	May 6, 2002	4–6	@ San Jose Sharks	Sharks lead 2–1	L
4	May 8, 2002	4–1	@ San Jose Sharks	Series tied 2–2	W
5	May 11, 2002	3–5	San Jose Sharks	Sharks lead 3–2	L
6	May 13, 2002	2–1 OT	@ San Jose Sharks	Series tied 3–3	W
7	May 15, 2002	1–0	San Jose Sharks	Avalanche win 4–3	W

Western Conference Finals vs. (1) Detroit Red Wings – Red Wings win 4–3

Game	Date	Score	Opponent	Series	Recap
1	May 18, 2002	3–5	@ Detroit Red Wings	Red Wings lead 1–0	L
2	May 20, 2002	4–3 OT	@ Detroit Red Wings	Series tied 1–1	W
3	May 22, 2002	1–2 OT	Detroit Red Wings	Red Wings lead 2–1	L
4	May 25, 2002	3–2	Detroit Red Wings	Series tied 2–2	W
5	May 27, 2002	2–1 OT	@ Detroit Red Wings	Avalanche lead 3–2	W
6	May 29, 2002	0–2	Detroit Red Wings	Series tied 3–3	L
7	May 31, 2002	0–7	@ Detroit Red Wings	Red Wings win 4–3	L

Legend: W Win L Loss

== Player statistics ==
=== Scoring ===
- Position abbreviations: C = Center; D = Defense; G = Goaltender; LW = Left wing; RW = Right wing
- † = Joined team via a transaction (e.g., trade, waivers, signing) during the season. Stats reflect time with the Avalanche only.
- ‡ = Left team via a transaction (e.g., trade, waivers, release) during the season. Stats reflect time with the Avalanche only.

No.	Player	Pos	Regular season						Playoffs					
No.	Player	Pos	GP	G	A	Pts	+/-	PIM	GP	G	A	Pts	+/-	PIM
19	Joe Sakic	C	82	26	53	79	12	18	21	9	10	19	−2	4
4	Rob Blake	D	75	16	40	56	16	58	20	6	6	12	−1	16
40	Alex Tanguay	LW	70	13	35	48	8	36	19	5	8	13	−8	0
18	Chris Drury	C	82	21	25	46	1	38	21	5	7	12	4	10
28	Steve Reinprecht	C	67	19	27	46	14	18	21	7	5	12	7	8
23	Milan Hejduk	RW	62	21	23	44	0	24	16	3	3	6	−4	4
41	Martin Skoula	D	82	10	21	31	−3	42	21	0	6	6	−5	2
17 (Note: Vrbata wore number 12 until Keane was acquired.)	Radim Vrbata	RW	52	18	12	30	7	14	9	0	0	0	−5	0
52	Adam Foote	D	55	5	22	27	7	55	21	1	6	7	−2	28
10	Ville Nieminen‡	LW	53	10	14	24	1	30	—	—	—	—	—	—
7	Greg de Vries	D	82	8	12	20	18	57	21	4	9	13	1	2
26	Stephane Yelle	C	73	5	12	17	1	48	20	0	2	2	−3	14
29	Eric Messier	LW	74	5	10	15	−5	26	21	1	2	3	−4	0
50	Brian Willsie	RW	56	7	7	14	4	14	4	0	1	1	0	2
3 (Note: Trepanier wore number 11 until Kasparaitis was acquired.)	Pascal Trepanier	D	74	4	9	13	4	59	2	0	0	0	−1	0
13	Dan Hinote	RW	58	6	6	12	8	39	19	1	2	3	−3	9
25	Shjon Podein‡	LW	41	6	6	12	0	39	—	—	—	—	—	—
9	Brad Larsen	LW	50	2	7	9	4	47	21	1	1	2	−4	13
12	Mike Keane†	RW	22	2	5	7	−2	16	18	1	4	5	0	8
32	Riku Hahl	C	22	2	3	5	1	14	21	1	2	3	−3	0
27	Scott Parker	RW	63	1	4	5	0	154	—	—	—	—	—	—
22	Vaclav Nedorost	C	25	2	2	4	−4	2	—	—	—	—	—	—
5	Todd Gill‡	D	36	0	4	4	3	25	—	—	—	—	—	—
33	Patrick Roy	G	63	0	3	3		26	21	0	2	2		0
20	Kelly Fairchild	C	10	2	0	2	1	2	—	—	—	—	—	—
2	Bryan Muir	D	22	1	1	2	1	9	21	0	0	0	−3	2
37	Jordan Krestanovich	LW	8	0	2	2	1	0	—	—	—	—	—	—
45	Jeff Daw	C	1	0	1	1	0	0	—	—	—	—	—	—
1	David Aebischer	G	21	0	0	0		4	1	0	0	0		2
6	Rick Berry‡	D	57	0	0	0	1	60	—	—	—	—	—	—
11	Darius Kasparaitis†	D	11	0	0	0	1	19	21	0	3	3	10	18
36	Steve Moore	C	8	0	0	0	−4	4	—	—	—	—	—	—
43	Jaroslav Obsut	D	3	0	0	0	0	0	—	—	—	—	—	—
21	Peter Forsberg	C	—	—	—	—	—	—	20	9	18	27	8	20

=== Goaltending ===
No.	Player	Regular season										Playoffs								
No.	Player	GP	W	L	T	SA	GA	GAA	SV%	SO	TOI	GP	W	L	SA	GA	GAA	SV%	SO	TOI
33	Patrick Roy	63	32	23	8	1629	122	1.94	.925	9	3773	21	11	10	572	52	2.51	.909	3	1241
1	David Aebischer	21	13	6	0	538	37	1.88	.931	2	1184	1	0	0	14	1	1.76	.929	0	34

== Awards and records ==
=== Awards ===
Type	Award/honor	Recipient	Ref
League (annual)	NHL First All-Star Team	Patrick Roy (Goaltender)	
League (annual)	NHL First All-Star Team	Joe Sakic (Center)	
League (annual)	NHL Second All-Star Team	Rob Blake (Defense)	
League (annual)	William M. Jennings Trophy	Patrick Roy	
League (in-season)	NHL All-Star Game selection	Rob Blake (Note: Blake and Roy were voted to the starting lineup.)	
League (in-season)	NHL All-Star Game selection	Patrick Roy	
League (in-season)	NHL All-Star Game selection	Joe Sakic	
League (in-season)	NHL Player of the Week	Patrick Roy (November 19)	
League (in-season)	NHL Player of the Week	Joe Sakic (December 10)	
League (in-season)	NHL Rookie of the Month	Radim Vrbata (February)	
League (in-season)	NHL YoungStars Game selection	Alex Tanguay (Note: Tanguay did not play.)	

=== Milestones ===
Milestone	Player	Date	Ref
First game	Vaclav Nedorost	October 3, 2001	
First game	Radim Vrbata	November 20, 2001	
First game	Steve Moore	January 1, 2002	
First game	Riku Hahl	January 9, 2002	
First game	Jeff Daw	January 30, 2002	
First game	Jordan Krestanovich	March 19, 2002	
1,000th game played	Todd Gill	January 21, 2002	
1,000th game played	Joe Sakic	March 9, 2002	

== Transactions ==
The Avalanche were involved in the following transactions from June 10, 2001, the day after the deciding game of the 2001 Stanley Cup Final, through June 13, 2002, the day of the deciding game of the 2002 Stanley Cup Final.

=== Trades ===
Date	Details		Ref
June 24, 2001	To Colorado Avalanche: 5th-round pick in 2001	To Carolina Hurricanes: Chris Dingman	
June 24, 2001	To Colorado Avalanche: Los Angeles’ 6th-round pick in 2001	To Tampa Bay Lightning: Nolan Pratt	
June 24, 2001	To Colorado Avalanche: 9th-round pick in 2002	To Tampa Bay Lightning: 9th-round pick in 2001	
January 24, 2002	To Colorado Avalanche: Brett Clark	To Atlanta Thrashers: Frederic Cassivi	
February 11, 2002	To Colorado Avalanche: Mike Keane	To St. Louis Blues: Shjon Podein	
March 1, 2002	To Colorado Avalanche: D. J. Smith	To Nashville Predators: Future considerations (Note: Conditional 9th-round pick in 2002)	
March 19, 2002	To Colorado Avalanche: Darius Kasparaitis	To Pittsburgh Penguins: Rick Berry; Ville Nieminen	

=== Players acquired ===
Date	Player	Former team	Term	Via	Ref
July 24, 2001	Todd Gill	Detroit Red Wings	1-year	Free agency	
July 30, 2001	Jeff Daw	Lowell Lock Monsters (AHL)	1-year	Free agency	
August 8, 2001	Jeff Paul	Chicago Blackhawks	2-year	Free agency	
August 9, 2001	Jaroslav Obsut	St. Louis Blues	1-year	Free agency	
September 6, 2001	Pascal Trepanier	Anaheim Mighty Ducks	1-year	Free agency	

=== Players lost ===
Date	Player	New team	Via (Note: In parentheses is the player's free agency group on July 1 if applicable.)	Ref
June 26, 2001	Ray Bourque		Retirement (III)	
June 27, 2001	Rob Shearer	HC TPS (Liiga)	Free agency (UFA)	
July 1, 2001	Jon Klemm	Chicago Blackhawks	Free agency (III)	
July 1, 2001	Dave Reid (Note: Reid retired.)		Contract expiration (III)	
August 14, 2001	Brian White	Anaheim Mighty Ducks	Free agency (VI)	
August 15, 2001	Joel Prpic	San Jose Sharks	Free agency (VI)	
September 5, 2001	Mike Craig	San Jose Sharks	Free agency (UFA)	
September 26, 2001	Nick Bootland	Cincinnati Cyclones (ECHL)	Free agency (UFA)	
N/A	Ben Storey	EK Zell am See (EBEL)	Free agency (UFA)	
October 25, 2001	Dan Smith	Colorado Gold Kings (WCHL)	Free agency (UFA)	
February 11, 2002	Todd Gill		Release	

=== Signings ===
Date	Player	Term	Contract type	Ref
July 1, 2001	Rob Blake	5-year	Re-signing	
July 1, 2001	Patrick Roy	3-year	Re-signing	
July 1, 2001	Joe Sakic	5-year	Re-signing	
July 27, 2001	Brent Thompson	2-year	Re-signing	
August 6, 2001	Yuri Babenko		Re-signing	
August 6, 2001	Kelly Fairchild	1-year	Re-signing	
August 6, 2001	Scott Parker	3-year	Re-signing	
August 7, 2001	Greg de Vries	2-year	Re-signing	
August 15, 2001	David Aebischer	3-year	Re-signing	
August 16, 2001	Eric Messier	3-year	Re-signing	
January 15, 2002	Peter Forsberg	1-year (Note: Club option for the 2002–03 season.)	Extension	

== Draft picks ==
Colorado's draft picks at the 2001 NHL entry draft held at the National Car Rental Center in Sunrise, Florida.

Round	#	Player	Nationality	College/Junior/Club team (League)
2	63	Peter Budaj	Slovakia	Toronto St. Michael's Majors (OHL)
3	97	Danny Bois	Canada	London Knights (OHL)
4	130	Colt King	Canada	Guelph Storm (OHL)
5	143	Frantisek Skladany	Slovakia	Boston University (NCAA)
5	144	Cody McCormick	Canada	Belleville Bulls (OHL)
5	149	Mikko Viitanen	Finland	Ahmat Hyvinkaa (Finland)
5	165	Pierre-Luc Emond	Canada	Drummondville Voltigeurs (QMJHL)
6	184	Scott Horvath	United States	University of Massachusetts Amherst (Hockey East)
6	196	Charlie Stephens	Canada	Guelph Storm (OHL)
7	227	Marek Svatos	Slovakia	Kootenay Ice (WHL)

== See also ==
- 2001–02 NHL season
