= Tyler Bouck =

Canadian ice hockey player (born 1980)

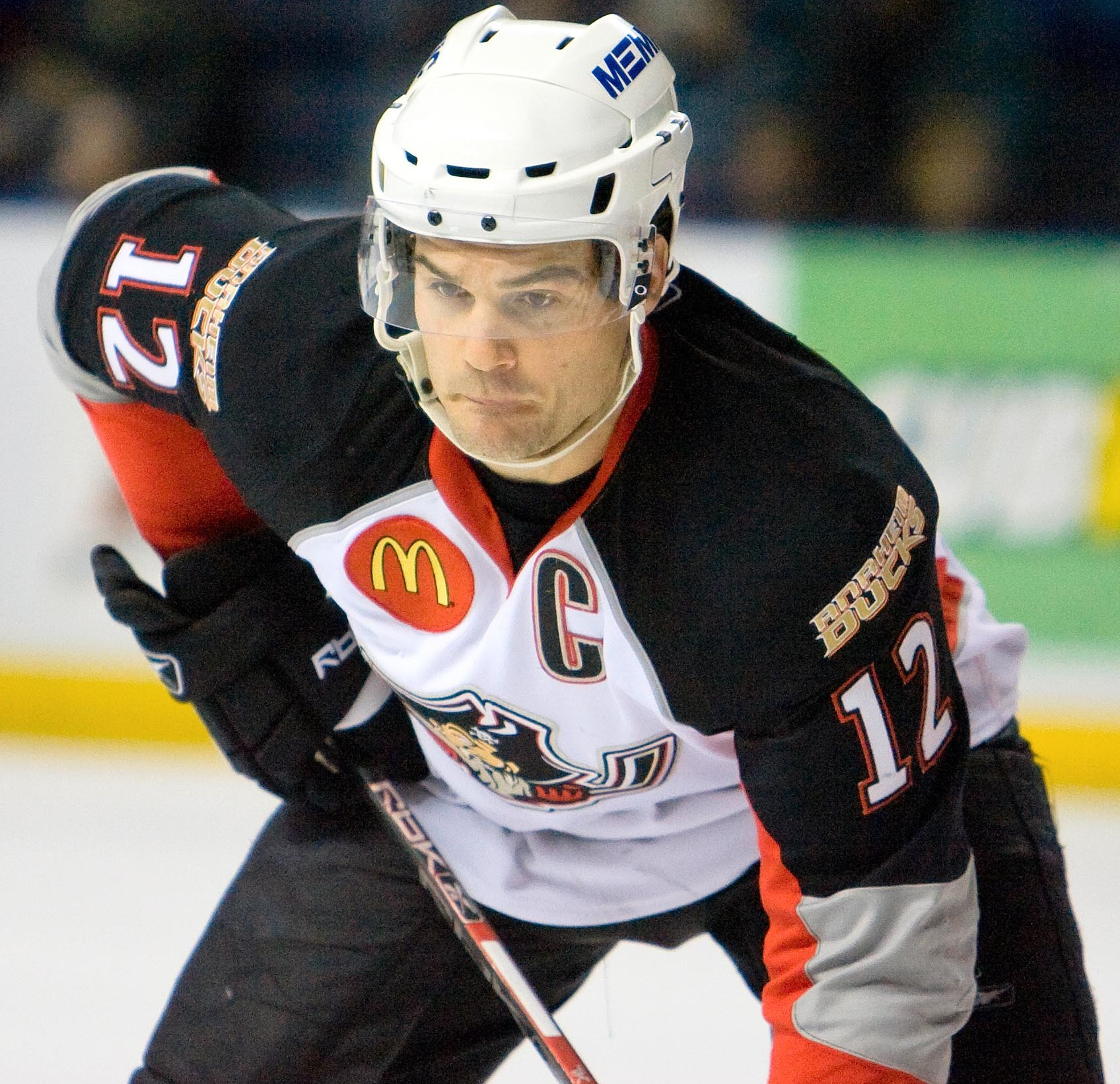
- Bouck with the Portland Pirates in 2008
- Born: January 13, 1980 (age 46) Camrose, Alberta, Canada
- Height: 6 ft 0 in (183 cm)
- Weight: 196 lb (89 kg; 14 st 0 lb)
- Position: Centre
- Shot: Left
- Played for: Dallas Stars; Phoenix Coyotes; Vancouver Canucks; HC TPS; ERC Ingolstadt
- NHL draft: 57th overall, 1998; Dallas Stars
- Playing career: 2000–2014

Tyler John Bouck (born January 13, 1980) is a Canadian former professional ice hockey centre who played in the National Hockey League (NHL) with the Dallas Stars, Phoenix Coyotes and the Vancouver Canucks. He spent the last five seasons of his career in Germany with ERC Ingolstadt of the Deutsche Eishockey Liga (DEL).

== Playing career ==
Bouck was a second-round draft pick (57th overall) by the Dallas Stars in the 1998 NHL entry draft after three years with the Prince George Cougars of the Western Hockey League. After another two seasons with the Cougars and a brief spell with the AHL's Utah Grizzlies, Bouck finally made his debut for Dallas during the 2000–01 NHL season, playing 48 regular-season games that season, scoring 7 points (2 goals and 5 assists).

On June 23, 2001, Bouck was traded from the Stars to the Phoenix Coyotes for Jyrki Lumme. Bouck only played seven games for Phoenix and played mostly for the Springfield Falcons of the AHL. Bouck's spell with the Coyotes lasted just six months as he was traded on December 28, 2001, along with Todd Warriner and Trevor Letowski to the Vancouver Canucks for Drake Berehowsky and Denis Pederson. Bouck began his Canucks career once again in the AHL with the Manitoba Moose until he was called up briefly to the Canucks roster in the 2003–04 NHL season, playing 18 regular-season games and scoring a goal and two assists for three points.

During the 2004–05 NHL lockout, Bouck was one of many NHL players who played in European leagues, playing for TPS in Finland's SM-liiga. He returned to the Canucks the following season, playing mostly with the Moose.

Without a club, Bouck was invited to the Anaheim Ducks training camp on September 10, 2007. After failing to catch on with the Ducks, Bouck was made captain of their affiliate, the Portland Pirates, for the 2007–08 season.

On August 8, 2008, Bouck was signed as an unrestricted free agent by the Buffalo Sabres, Portland's new NHL parent club, and was assigned to remain with the Pirates for the 2008–09 season.

After serving as captain of the Pirates for two seasons, Bouck left the team at season's end on April 27, 2009, signing with Deutsche Eishockey Liga club ERC Ingolstadt.

== Career statistics ==
			Regular season					Playoffs
Season	Team	League	GP	G	A	Pts	PIM	GP	G	A	Pts	PIM
1995–96	Prince George Cougars	WHL	7	2	1	3	4	—	—	—	—	—
1996–97	Prince George Cougars	WHL	12	0	2	2	11	—	—	—	—	—
1997–98	Prince George Cougars	WHL	65	11	26	37	90	11	1	0	1	21
1998–99	Prince George Cougars	WHL	56	22	25	47	178	2	0	2	2	10
1999–00	Prince George Cougars	WHL	57	30	33	63	183	13	6	13	19	36
2000–01	Utah Grizzlies	IHL	24	2	6	8	39	—	—	—	—	—
2000–01	Dallas Stars	NHL	48	2	5	7	29	1	0	0	0	0
2001–02	Phoenix Coyotes	NHL	7	0	0	0	4	—	—	—	—	—
2001–02	Springfield Falcons	AHL	21	1	2	3	33	—	—	—	—	—
2001–02	Manitoba Moose	AHL	20	4	4	8	25	—	—	—	—	—
2002–03	Manitoba Moose	AHL	76	10	28	38	103	14	2	2	4	10
2003–04	Manitoba Moose	AHL	49	11	14	25	100	—	—	—	—	—
2003–04	Vancouver Canucks	NHL	18	1	2	3	23	1	0	0	0	0
2004–05	TPS	SM-l	40	3	7	10	100	6	1	0	1	12
2005–06	Vancouver Canucks	NHL	12	1	1	2	21	—	—	—	—	—
2005–06	Manitoba Moose	AHL	8	0	1	1	8	—	—	—	—	—
2006–07	Manitoba Moose	AHL	24	1	3	4	36	—	—	—	—	—
2006–07	Vancouver Canucks	NHL	6	0	0	0	16	—	—	—	—	—
2007–08	Portland Pirates	AHL	79	11	18	29	86	13	0	2	2	8
2008–09	Portland Pirates	AHL	63	7	16	23	80	5	1	0	1	0
2009–10	ERC Ingolstadt	DEL	56	18	21	39	80	9	1	2	3	33
2010–11	ERC Ingolstadt	DEL	19	3	5	8	33	—	—	—	—	—
2011–12	ERC Ingolstadt	DEL	43	11	13	24	64	7	0	2	2	35
2012–13	ERC Ingolstadt	DEL	18	5	5	10	26	—	—	—	—	—
2013–14	ERC Ingolstadt	DEL	30	2	6	8	41	19	2	6	8	26
NHL totals			91	4	8	12	93	2	0	0	0	0

== Awards and achievements ==
- 1999–2000 WHL West First All-Star Team
