= Drake Berehowsky =

Canadian ice hockey player (born 1972)

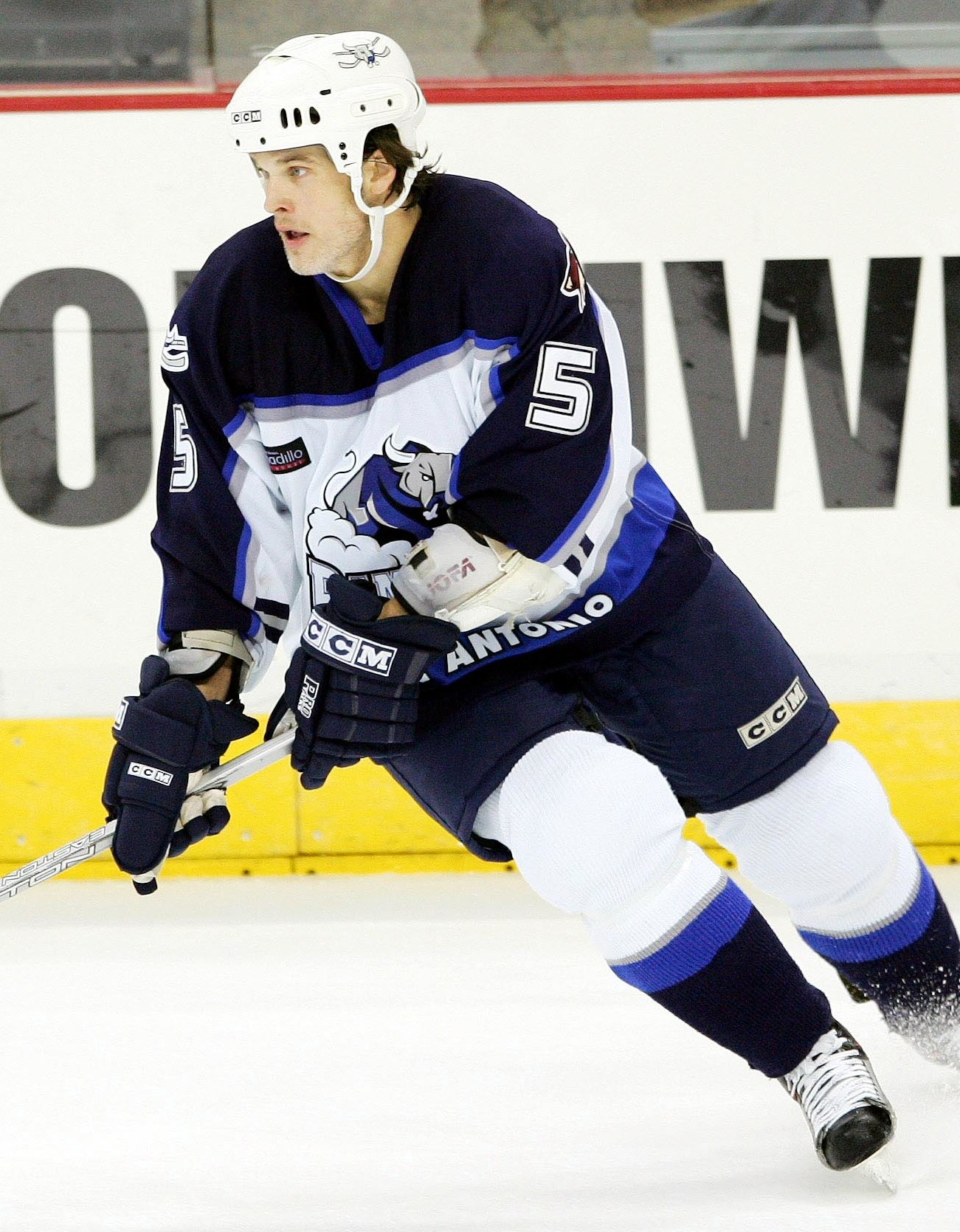
- Berehowsky with the San Antonio Rampage in 2005
- Born: January 3, 1972 (age 54) Toronto, Ontario, Canada
- Height: 6 ft 2 in (188 cm)
- Weight: 211 lb (96 kg; 15 st 1 lb)
- Position: Defence
- Shot: Right
- Played for: Toronto Maple Leafs; Pittsburgh Penguins; Edmonton Oilers; Nashville Predators; Vancouver Canucks; Phoenix Coyotes
- NHL draft: 10th overall, 1990; Toronto Maple Leafs
- Playing career: 1990–2006

Drake Berehowsky (born January 3, 1972) is a Canadian former professional ice hockey defenceman. He is best known for his time in the National Hockey League (NHL), where he played for the Toronto Maple Leafs, Pittsburgh Penguins, Edmonton Oilers, Nashville Predators, Vancouver Canucks and Phoenix Coyotes.

He is the former head coach of the Orlando Solar Bears of the ECHL. He had two stints as the team's head coach, first coaching the Solar Bears during the 2012–13 season. Following the 2021–22 season, the Solar Bears and Berehowsky mutually agreed to part ways.

== Playing career ==
As a youth, Berehowsky played in the 1985 Quebec International Pee-Wee Hockey Tournament with the Toronto Marlboros minor ice hockey team.

Berehowsky began his junior hockey career with the Kingston Raiders of the Ontario Hockey League (OHL) in 1988 and had a strong rookie season, earning 46 points in 63 games. The Raiders were renamed the "Kingston Frontenacs" in 1989–90. Berehowsky only appeared in nine games as he suffered a serious knee injury. He earned 14 points in those nine games and the Toronto Maple Leafs drafted Berehowsky with their first round draft pick in the 1990 NHL entry draft. Berehowsky split the 1990–91 season between the Frontenacs and the North Bay Centennials before earning a late season call-up to the Leafs. He returned to North Bay for the 1991–92 season, recording 82 points in 62 games, helping the Centennials to the OHL finals, tallying 31 points in 21 post-season games. Berehowsky earned another late season call-up to Toronto, appearing in a single game, before being sent to the St. John's Maple Leafs for the 1992 American Hockey League (AHL) playoffs, where he recorded five assists in six games.

Berehowsky split the 1992–93 and 1993–94 seasons between St. John's and Toronto before earning a full-time roster spot in Toronto in the 1994–95 season. Berehowsky appeared in 25 games with the Maple Leafs in 1994–95. On April 7, 1995, the team traded him to the Pittsburgh Penguins for Grant Jennings. Berehowsky finished the season as the odd man out on the Penguins' defense, as he appeared in only four regular season games and one playoff game with the team. In 1995–96, Pittsburgh sent Berehowsky to the Cleveland Lumberjacks, their AHL affiliate, for most of the season and he only appeared in one game with the Penguins. After the season, Berehowsky became a free agent.

He split the 1996–97 season between the Carolina Monarchs of the AHL and the San Antonio Dragons of the International Hockey League until signing an NHL contract with the Edmonton Oilers on September 30, 1997. Berehowsky spent most of the season with the Oilers, appearing in 67 regular season and 12 post-season games with the club. However, he did spend some time with the Hamilton Bulldogs of the AHL, playing in eight games.

On October 1, 1998, the Oilers traded Berehowsky, Éric Fichaud and Greg de Vries to the Nashville Predators for Mikhail Shtalenkov and Jim Dowd. Berehowsky played with the Predators until 2001, having a career season in 1999–2000 when he scored 12 goals and 32 points, leading the Nashville defense in goals. On March 9, 2001, the Predators dealt Berehowsky to the Vancouver Canucks.

Berehowsky's time with the Canucks was short, as he was once again traded, on December 28, 2001, with Denis Pederson, to the Phoenix Coyotes for Todd Warriner, Trevor Letowski and Tyler Bouck. Berehowsky spent regular time on the Coyotes' blueline, helping them to the post-season. An injury suffered in training camp sidelined Berehowsky for most of the 2002–03 season, and he only appeared in seven games with Phoenix, and two with the Springfield Falcons of the AHL before becoming a free agent at the end of the season.

On August 29, 2003, he signed with the Pittsburgh Penguins, where he had played from 1994 to 1996. Berehowsky played in 47 more games with the Penguins. On February 11, 2004, the Penguins traded Berehowsky to his original NHL team, the Toronto Maple Leafs, for Ric Jackman, where he finished out the season.

With the NHL in a lockout for the 2004–05 season, Berehowsky signed with Skellefteå AIK in Sweden for the season, before signing a contract with Eisbären Berlin in Germany for the 2005–06 season. After the season with Berlin, Berehowsky returned to North America, where he signed with the San Antonio Rampage of the AHL, before retiring from hockey in the summer of 2006.

== Coaching career ==
After his NHL career, Berehowsky served as an assistant coach with the Peoria Rivermen of the AHL for three seasons. On June 19, 2012, Berehowsky was named head coach of the Orlando Solar Bears for their inaugural season in the ECHL. In the 2012–13 season, Berehowsky lead the expansion team to a record of 28 wins, 37 losses, 3 overtime losses, and 4 shootout losses totaling 63 points; second to last place in the 14-team Eastern Conference, with only three teams finishing with fewer points in the 23-team league.

Global Lethbridge's Paul Kingsmith announced June 4, 2013, Berehowsky was to be the next head coach for the Lethbridge Hurricanes of the Western Hockey League (WHL). During his first season with the club, the Hurricanes finished with 16 fewer wins and 37 fewer points than the previous season. The team missed the playoffs for the fifth consecutive season and set the franchise record for fewest wins (12) and fewest points (29) in the 26 season Lethbridge Hurricanes' history as well as the 47-year franchise history. On December 9, 2014, Berehowsky was fired from his coaching duties with the struggling Hurricanes.

He then joined the Sudbury Wolves of the Ontario Hockey League as an associate coach in 2015. On November 14, 2016, Berehowsky left the Wolves to return to Orlando for a second stint as head coach of the Solar Bears.

== Career statistics ==
			Regular season					Playoffs
Season	Team	League	GP	G	A	Pts	PIM	GP	G	A	Pts	PIM
1987–88	Barrie Colts	CJHL	40	10	36	46	81	—	—	—	—	—
1988–89	Kingston Raiders	OHL	63	7	39	46	85	—	—	—	—	—
1988–89	Canada	Intl	1	0	0	0	0	—	—	—	—	—
1989–90	Kingston Frontenacs	OHL	9	3	11	14	28	—	—	—	—	—
1990–91	Kingston Frontenacs	OHL	13	5	13	18	38	—	—	—	—	—
1990–91	North Bay Centennials	OHL	26	7	23	30	51	10	2	7	9	21
1990–91	Toronto Maple Leafs	NHL	8	0	1	1	25	—	—	—	—	—
1991–92	North Bay Centennials	OHL	62	19	63	82	147	21	7	24	31	22
1991–92	St. John's Maple Leafs	AHL	—	—	—	—	—	6	0	5	5	21
1991–92	Toronto Maple Leafs	NHL	1	0	0	0	0	—	—	—	—	—
1992–93	St. John's Maple Leafs	AHL	28	10	17	27	38	—	—	—	—	—
1992–93	Toronto Maple Leafs	NHL	41	4	15	19	61	—	—	—	—	—
1993–94	St. John's Maple Leafs	AHL	18	3	12	15	40	—	—	—	—	—
1993–94	Toronto Maple Leafs	NHL	49	2	8	10	63	—	—	—	—	—
1994–95	Toronto Maple Leafs	NHL	25	0	2	2	15	—	—	—	—	—
1994–95	Pittsburgh Penguins	NHL	4	0	0	0	13	1	0	0	0	0
1995–96	Cleveland Lumberjacks	IHL	74	6	28	34	141	3	0	3	3	6
1995–96	Pittsburgh Penguins	NHL	1	0	0	0	0	—	—	—	—	—
1996–97	Carolina Monarchs	AHL	49	2	15	17	55	—	—	—	—	—
1996–97	San Antonio Dragons	IHL	16	3	4	7	36	—	—	—	—	—
1997–98	Hamilton Bulldogs	AHL	8	2	0	2	21	—	—	—	—	—
1997–98	Edmonton Oilers	NHL	67	1	6	7	169	12	1	2	3	14
1998–99	Nashville Predators	NHL	74	2	15	17	140	—	—	—	—	—
1999–2000	Nashville Predators	NHL	79	12	20	32	87	—	—	—	—	—
2000–01	Nashville Predators	NHL	66	6	18	24	100	—	—	—	—	—
2000–01	Vancouver Canucks	NHL	14	1	1	2	21	4	0	0	0	12
2001–02	Vancouver Canucks	NHL	25	1	2	3	18	—	—	—	—	—
2001–02	Phoenix Coyotes	NHL	32	1	4	5	42	5	0	1	1	4
2002–03	Springfield Falcons	AHL	2	0	0	0	0	—	—	—	—	—
2002–03	Phoenix Coyotes	NHL	7	1	2	3	27	—	—	—	—	—
2003–04	Pittsburgh Penguins	NHL	47	5	16	21	50	—	—	—	—	—
2003–04	Toronto Maple Leafs	NHL	9	1	2	3	17	—	—	—	—	—
2004–05	Skellefteå AIK	Allsv	8	1	0	1	49	10	2	5	7	14
2005–06	San Antonio Rampage	AHL	18	0	1	1	23	—	—	—	—	—
2005–06	Eisbären Berlin	DEL	19	3	12	15	18	11	1	1	2	12
NHL totals			549	37	112	149	848	22	1	3	4	30

=== Head coach record ===
Team	Year	Regular season							Postseason
Team	Year	GP	Win	Lose	OTL	Pts	Point %	Finish	Result
Orlando Solar Bears (ECHL)	2012-2013	72	28	37	7	63	.438	5th (South)	Missed playoffs
Lethbridge Hurricanes (WHL)	2013-2014	72	12	55	5	29	.201	5th (Central)	Missed Playoffs
Lethbridge Hurricanes (WHL)	2014-2015	72	20	44	8	48	.333	5th (Central)	Missed playoffs
Orlando Solar Bears (ECHL) (interim coach)	2016-2017	61	31	21	9	70	.582	4th (South)	Loss vs Florida Everblades (4–3)
Orlando Solar Bears (ECHL)	2017-2018	72	33	30	9	72	.521	3rd (South)	Win vs South Carolina Stingrays (4–1). Loss vs Florida (4–0)
Orlando Solar Bears (ECHL)	2018-2019	72	41	25	6	88	.621	2nd (South)	Win vs South Carolina (4–1), Lose vs Florida (4–1)
Orlando Solar Bears (ECHL)	2019-2020	62	27	29	6	60	.484	5th (South)	Playoffs cancelled (COVID-19)
Total (ECHL)		339	160	142	37	-	.471	-	
Total (WHL)		144	32	99	13	-	.222	-	

Awards and achievements
Preceded by John Uniac	Jack Ferguson Award; 1988	Succeeded by Eric Lindros
Preceded by Steve Bancroft	Toronto Maple Leafs first-round draft pick 1990	Succeeded by Brandon Convery
