= Dan Focht =

Canadian ice hockey player (born 1977)

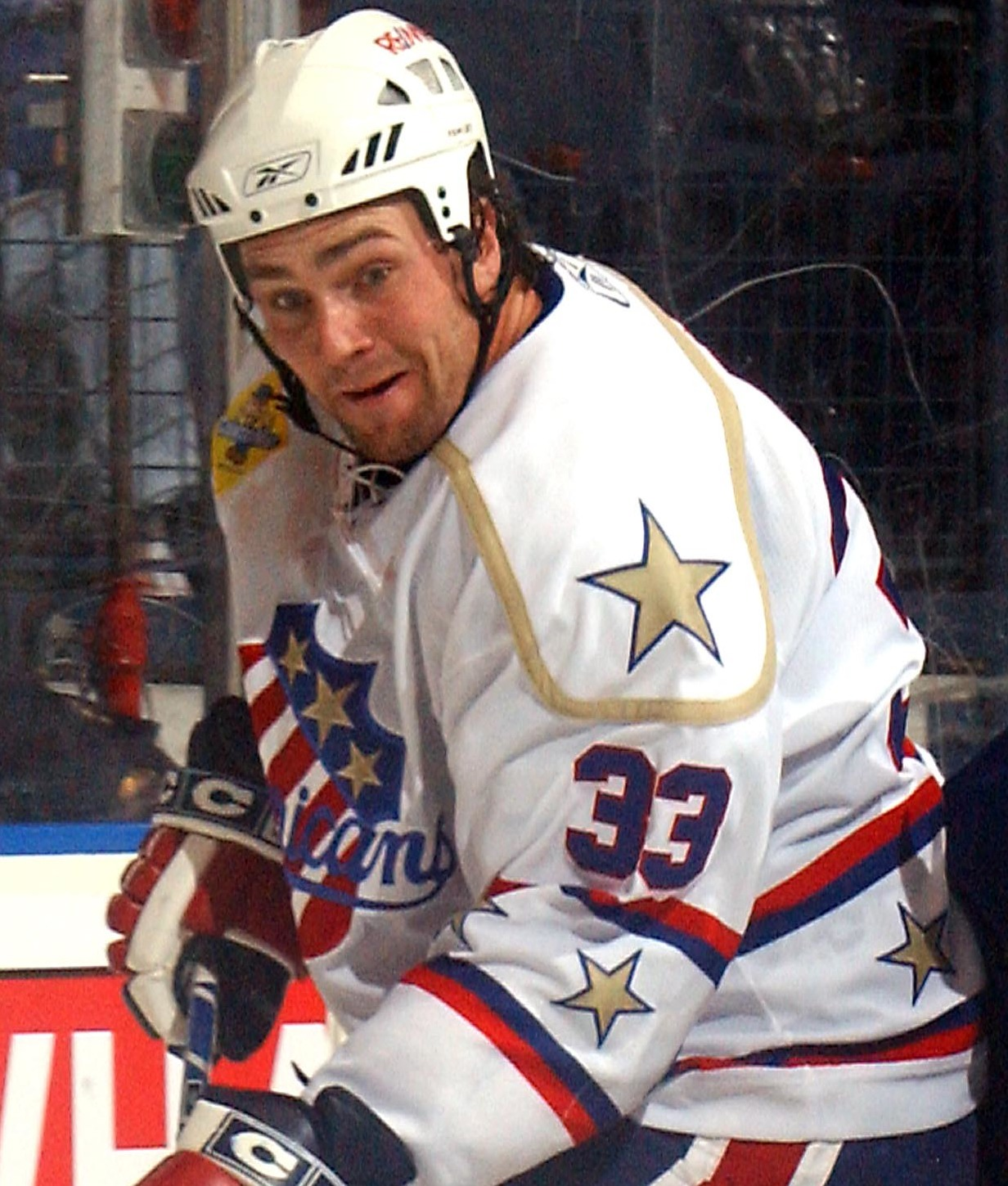
- Focht with the Rochester Americans in 2005
- Born: December 31, 1977 (age 48) Regina, Saskatchewan, Canada
- Height: 6 ft 6 in (198 cm)
- Weight: 240 lb (109 kg; 17 st 2 lb)
- Position: Defence
- Shot: Left
- Played for: Phoenix Coyotes; Pittsburgh Penguins
- NHL draft: 11th overall, 1996; Phoenix Coyotes
- Playing career: 1997–2006

Dan Focht (born December 31, 1977) is a Canadian former professional ice hockey defenceman. He was drafted by the Phoenix Coyotes in the first round, 11th overall, in the 1996 NHL entry draft.

== Playing career ==
After playing three seasons in the Western Hockey League, Focht joined the Coyotes' American Hockey League affiliate, the Springfield Falcons, for the 1997–98 season. He did not make his NHL debut with the Coyotes, however, until the 2001–02 season, during which he appeared in eight games.

After playing in ten more games for the Coyotes in the 2002–03 season, he was traded to the Pittsburgh Penguins in a multi-player deal which saw Jan Hrdina go to Phoenix. Focht appeared in 64 games in two seasons with the Penguins.

Most recently, Focht spent the 2005–06 season with the Rochester Americans of the AHL.

== Career statistics ==
			Regular season					Playoffs
Season	Team	League	GP	G	A	Pts	PIM	GP	G	A	Pts	PIM
1994–95	Saskatoon Blazers AAA	SMHL	33	6	12	18	98	—	—	—	—	—
1995–96	Tri-City Americans	WHL	63	6	12	18	161	11	1	1	2	23
1996–97	Tri-City Americans	WHL	28	0	5	5	92	—	—	—	—	—
1996–97	Regina Pats	WHL	22	2	2	4	59	5	0	2	2	8
1996–97	Springfield Falcons	AHL	1	0	0	0	2	—	—	—	—	—
1997–98	Springfield Falcons	AHL	61	2	5	7	125	3	0	0	0	4
1998–99	Springfield Falcons	AHL	30	0	2	2	58	3	1	0	1	10
1998–99	Mississippi Sea Wolves	ECHL	2	0	0	0	6	—	—	—	—	—
1999–00	Jokerit	SM-l	2	0	0	0	0	—	—	—	—	—
1999–00	Mississippi Sea Wolves	ECHL	4	0	1	1	0	—	—	—	—	—
1999–00	Springfield Falcons	AHL	44	2	9	11	86	5	0	1	1	2
2000–01	Springfield Falcons	AHL	69	0	6	6	156	—	—	—	—	—
2001–02	Springfield Falcons	AHL	56	2	8	10	134	—	—	—	—	—
2001–02	Phoenix Coyotes	NHL	8	0	0	0	11	1	0	1	1	0
2002–03	Springfield Falcons	AHL	37	2	7	9	80	—	—	—	—	—
2002–03	Phoenix Coyotes	NHL	10	0	0	0	10	—	—	—	—	—
2002–03	Pittsburgh Penguins	NHL	12	0	3	3	19	—	—	—	—	—
2003–04	Pittsburgh Penguins	NHL	52	2	3	5	105	—	—	—	—	—
2004–05	Hamilton Bulldogs	AHL	26	2	3	5	84	—	—	—	—	—
2005–06	Rochester Americans	AHL	54	2	5	7	146	—	—	—	—	—
AHL totals			378	12	45	57	871	11	1	1	2	16
NHL totals			82	2	6	8	145	1	0	1	1	0

Preceded by Shane Doan	Phoenix Coyotes first-round draft pick 1996	Succeeded by Daniel Brière
