= Martin Podlešák =

Czech professional ice hockey player (born 1982)

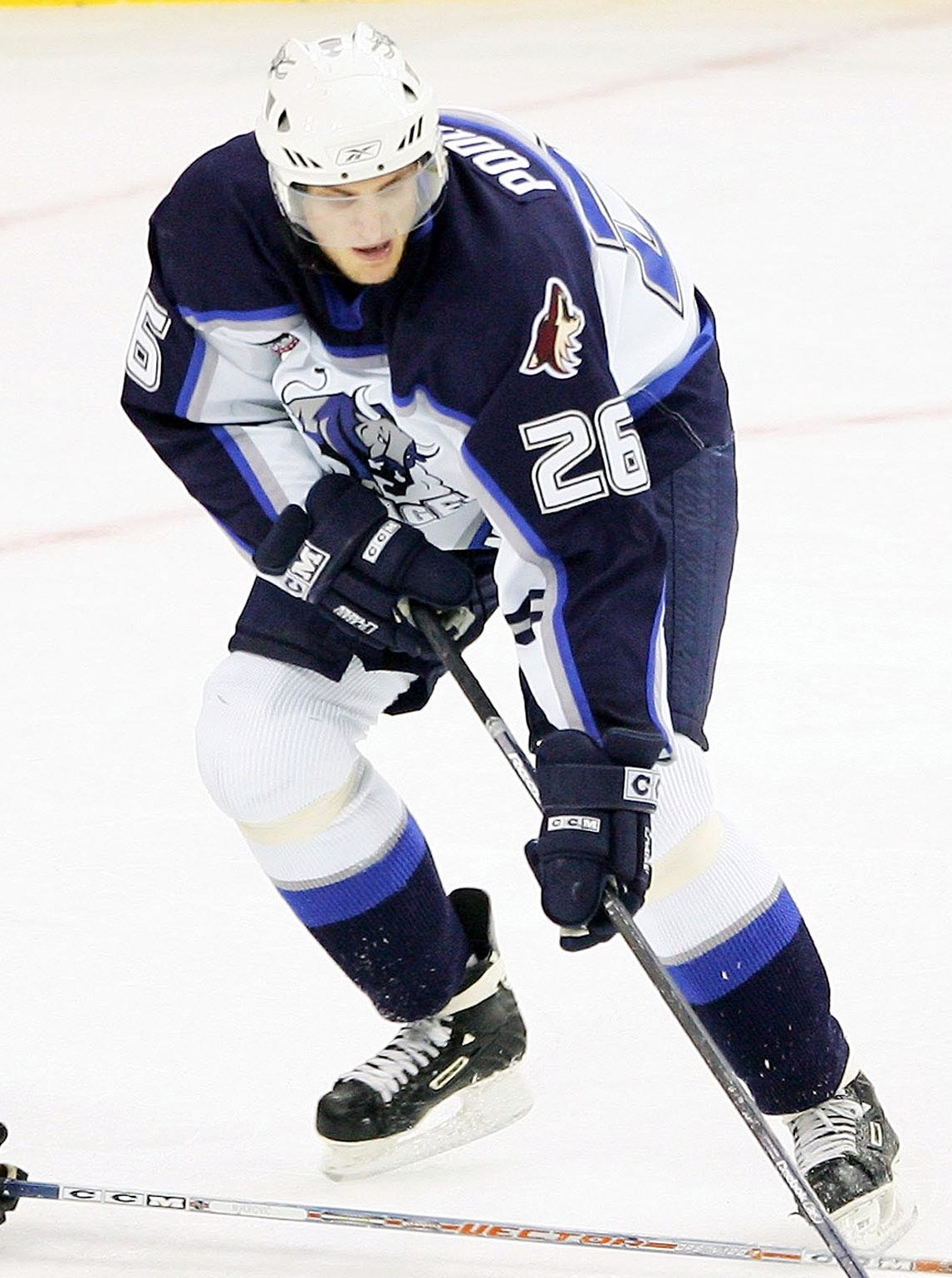
- Podlešák with the San Antonio Rampage in 2005
- Born: September 26, 1982 (age 43) Mělník, Czechoslovakia
- Height: 6 ft 5 in (196 cm)
- Weight: 227 lb (103 kg; 16 st 3 lb)
- Position: Centre
- Shot: Left
- Played for: Springfield Falcons; Utah Grizzlies; San Antonio Rampage; HC Sparta Praha; HC České Budějovice; HK Hradec Kralove
- NHL draft: 45th overall, 2001; Phoenix Coyotes
- Playing career: 2002–2014

Martin Podlešák (born September 26, 1982) is a Czech former professional ice hockey player. He was originally selected by the Phoenix Coyotes in the 2nd round (45th overall) of the 2001 NHL entry draft.

Podlešák played with HC České Budějovice in the Czech Extraliga during the 2010–11 Czech Extraliga season. He previously played for HC Sparta Praha, Lethbridge Hurricanes, Springfield Falcons, Utah Grizzlies and San Antonio Rampage.

On August 4, 2014, Podlešák signed a one-year contract with the Nottingham Panthers of the Elite Ice Hockey League, however left the club without making his debut, due to a family bereavement, to return to the Czech Republic on September 2, 2014.

== Career statistics ==
=== Regular season and playoffs ===
			Regular season					Playoffs
Season	Team	League	GP	G	A	Pts	PIM	GP	G	A	Pts	PIM
1999–2000	HC Sparta Praha	CZE U20	35	8	6	14	22	—	—	—	—	—
2000–01	Tri–City Americans	WHL	39	13	13	26	36	—	—	—	—	—
2000–01	Lethbridge Hurricanes	WHL	21	8	6	14	23	3	1	1	2	2
2001–02	Lethbridge Hurricanes	WHL	34	14	20	34	33	—	—	—	—	—
2002–03	Springfield Falcons	AHL	3	0	0	0	4	—	—	—	—	—
2003–04	Springfield Falcons	AHL	57	5	9	14	21	—	—	—	—	—
2004–05	Utah Grizzlies	AHL	10	0	1	1	14	—	—	—	—	—
2005–06	San Antonio Rampage	AHL	13	2	6	8	6	—	—	—	—	—
2006–07	HC Sparta Praha	ELH	37	1	5	6	16	12	1	0	1	6
2007–08	HC Sparta Praha	ELH	41	1	0	1	6	4	0	0	0	38
2007–08	HC Berounští Medvědi	CZE.2	1	2	0	2	2	—	—	—	—	—
2008–09	HC Sparta Praha	ELH	40	9	4	13	75	10	0	0	0	33
2008–09	HC Berounští Medvědi	CZE.2	1	0	0	0	0	—	—	—	—	—
2009–10	HC Sparta Praha	ELH	46	6	4	10	78	5	0	0	0	4
2009–10	HC Berounští Medvědi	CZE.2	1	0	0	0	2	—	—	—	—	—
2010–11	HC Mountfield	ELH	36	3	6	9	16	6	0	1	1	2
2011–12	HC Mountfield	ELH	27	0	3	3	12	5	1	0	1	16
2012–13	HC Mountfield	ELH	32	5	2	7	85	5	1	1	2	4
2013–14	Mountfield HK	ELH	23	3	4	7	20	1	0	0	0	2
2013–14	HC Stadion Litoměřice	CZE.2	3	1	0	1	20	—	—	—	—	—
AHL totals			83	7	16	23	55	—	—	—	—	—
ELH totals			282	28	28	56	308	48	3	2	5	105

=== International ===
Year	Team	Event	GP	G	A	Pts	PIM
2000	Czech Republic	WJC18	6	3	0	3	20
2002	Czech Republic	WJC	7	2	0	2	2
Junior totals			13	5	0	5	22
