= Evgeny Gladskikh =

Russian ice hockey player (born 1982)

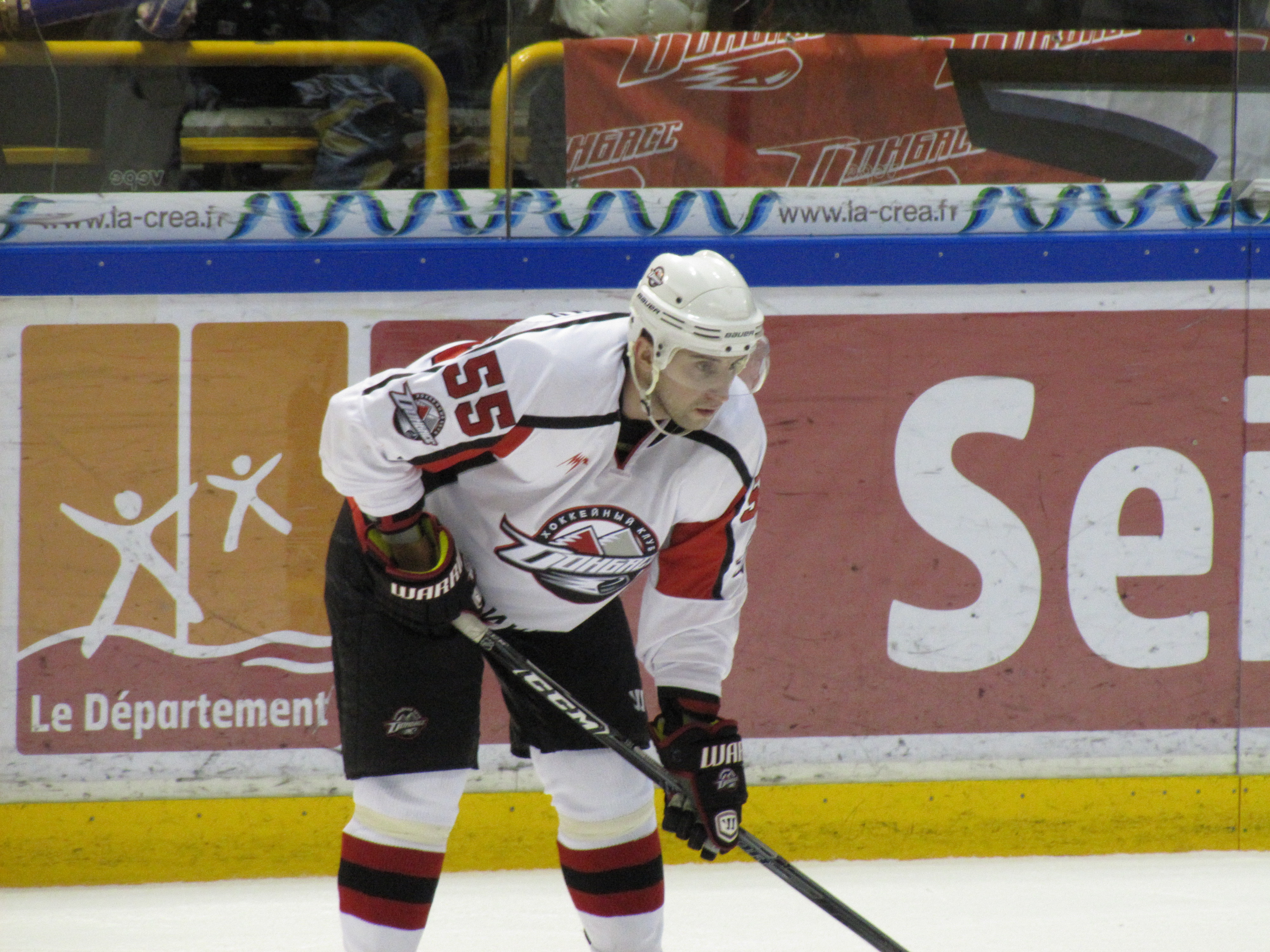
- Evgeny Gladskikh
- Born: April 24, 1982 (age 44) Magnitogorsk, Soviet Union
- Height: 6 ft 0 in (183 cm)
- Weight: 198 lb (90 kg; 14 st 2 lb)
- Position: Right wing
- Shot: Left
- Played for: Metallurg Magnitogorsk; Atlant Mytishchi; Avangard Omsk; Torpedo Nizhny Novgorod; HC Sarov; Rubin Tyumen; Donbass Donetsk; HK Almaty
- NHL draft: 114th overall, 2001; Vancouver Canucks
- Playing career: 1998–2014

Evgeny Gladskikh (born 24 April 1982) is a Russian ice hockey player who is currently playing for Torpedo Nizhny Novgorod in the Kontinental Hockey League (KHL). He was selected by Vancouver Canucks in the 4th round (114th overall) of the 2001 NHL entry draft.

== Career statistics ==
			Regular season					Playoffs
Season	Team	League	GP	G	A	Pts	PIM	GP	G	A	Pts	PIM
1998–99	Metallurg–2 Magnitogorsk	RUS.3	16	3	3	6	6	—	—	—	—	—
1999–2000	Metallurg Magnitogorsk	RSL	2	0	0	0	0	—	—	—	—	—
1999–2000	Metallurg–2 Magnitogorsk	RUS.3	39	17	2	19	24	—	—	—	—	—
2000–01	Metallurg Magnitogorsk	RSL	31	3	5	8	8	12	0	2	2	2
2000–01	Metallurg–2 Magnitogorsk	RUS.3	11	11	5	16	8	—	—	—	—	—
2001–02	Metallurg Magnitogorsk	RSL	32	5	6	11	8	4	0	0	0	4
2001–02	Metallurg–2 Magnitogorsk	RUS.3	2	2	1	3	0	—	—	—	—	—
2002–03	Metallurg Magnitogorsk	RSL	42	4	7	11	18	3	0	0	0	2
2002–03	Metallurg–2 Magnitogorsk	RUS.3	9	8	7	15	4	—	—	—	—	—
2003–04	Metallurg Magnitogorsk	RSL	47	13	13	26	22	14	3	1	4	10
2003–04	Metallurg–2 Magnitogorsk	RUS.3	2	2	3	5	2	—	—	—	—	—
2004–05	Metallurg Magnitogorsk	RSL	42	11	12	23	24	4	1	0	1	4
2004–05	Metallurg–2 Magnitogorsk	RUS.3	2	0	2	2	0	—	—	—	—	—
2005–06	Metallurg Magnitogorsk	RSL	43	12	8	20	20	7	1	1	2	2
2006–07	Metallurg Magnitogorsk	RSL	47	5	9	14	16	15	2	4	6	6
2007–08	Metallurg Magnitogorsk	RSL	52	12	12	24	12	12	2	2	4	2
2008–09	Avangard Omsk	KHL	17	1	4	5	4	—	—	—	—	—
2008–09	Atlant Moscow Oblast	KHL	26	2	8	10	22	7	1	0	1	2
2009–10	Metallurg Magnitogorsk	KHL	37	4	6	10	14	6	0	0	0	2
2010–11	Torpedo Nizhny Novgorod	KHL	7	0	0	0	4	—	—	—	—	—
2010–11	HC Sarov	VHL	3	0	0	0	6	—	—	—	—	—
2010–11	Rubin Tyumen	VHL	5	0	1	1	0	—	—	—	—	—
2011–12	Donbass Donetsk	VHL	37	1	2	3	12	4	0	0	0	0
2012–13	HK Almaty	KAZ	50	9	16	25	24	5	1	1	2	4
2013–14	HK Almaty	KAZ	25	2	6	8	6	—	—	—	—	—
RSL totals			338	65	72	137	128	71	9	10	19	32
KHL totals			87	7	18	25	44	13	1	0	1	4
