= Todd Warriner =

Canadian ice hockey player (born 1974)

- Born: January 3, 1974 (age 52) Blenheim, Ontario, Canada
- Height: 6 ft 2 in (188 cm)
- Weight: 191 lb (87 kg; 13 st 9 lb)
- Position: Left wing
- Shot: Left
- Played for: Toronto Maple Leafs; Tampa Bay Lightning; Phoenix Coyotes; Vancouver Canucks; Philadelphia Flyers; Nashville Predators; Jokerit; HC Forward-Morges; Hannover Scorpions; Kölner Haie
- National team: Canada
- NHL draft: 4th overall, 1992; Quebec Nordiques
- Playing career: 1994–2009

Olympic medal record

Men's ice hockey

Representing Canada
Silver medal – second place	1994 Lillehammer	Team

Todd Eaton Warriner (born January 3, 1974) is a Canadian former professional ice hockey forward. Over the course of his career, Warriner played for the Toronto Maple Leafs, Tampa Bay Lightning, Phoenix Coyotes, Vancouver Canucks, Philadelphia Flyers, and Nashville Predators of the NHL. He also played for several teams in Europe, including Jokerit of the Finnish SM-liiga, and the Hannover Scorpions and Kölner Haie of the German Deutsche Eishockey Liga.

== Playing career ==
Warriner was drafted by the Quebec Nordiques as their first-round pick, #4 overall, in the 1992 NHL entry draft. He did not play for Quebec though. He played for several teams in the NHL, as well as the AHL, OHL, the Finnish SM-liiga and the Swiss league.

Warriner is also notable for having scored the first goal in the history of the then newly opened Air Canada Centre on February 20, 1999 as a member of the home Toronto Maple Leafs. He was a member of the Canadian team that won the 2005 Deutschland Cup.

== Career statistics ==
=== Regular season and playoffs ===
			Regular season					Playoffs
Season	Team	League	GP	G	A	Pts	PIM	GP	G	A	Pts	PIM
1988–89	Blenheim Blades	GLJHL	10	1	4	5	0	—	—	—	—	—
1989–90	Chatham MicMac	WOHL	40	24	21	45	12	—	—	—	—	—
1990–91	Windsor Spitfires	OHL	57	36	28	64	26	11	5	6	11	12
1991–92	Windsor Spitfires	OHL	50	41	42	83	66	7	5	4	9	6
1992–93	Windsor Spitfires	OHL	23	13	21	34	29	—	—	—	—	—
1992–93	Kitchener Rangers	OHL	32	19	24	43	35	7	5	14	19	14
1993–94	Canadian National Team	Intl	54	12	21	33	33	—	—	—	—	—
1993–94	Kitchener Rangers	OHL	—	—	—	—	—	1	0	1	1	0
1993–94	Cornwall Aces	AHL	—	—	—	—	—	10	1	4	5	4
1994–95	St. John's Maple Leafs	AHL	46	8	10	18	22	4	1	0	1	2
1994–95	Toronto Maple Leafs	NHL	5	0	0	0	0	—	—	—	—	—
1995–96	St. John's Maple Leafs	AHL	11	5	6	11	16	—	—	—	—	—
1995–96	Toronto Maple Leafs	NHL	57	7	8	15	26	6	1	1	2	2
1996–97	Toronto Maple Leafs	NHL	75	12	21	33	41	—	—	—	—	—
1997–98	Toronto Maple Leafs	NHL	45	5	8	13	20	—	—	—	—	—
1998–99	Toronto Maple Leafs	NHL	53	9	10	19	28	9	0	0	0	2
1999–00	Toronto Maple Leafs	NHL	18	3	1	4	2	—	—	—	—	—
1999–00	Tampa Bay Lightning	NHL	55	11	13	24	34	—	—	—	—	—
2000–01	Tampa Bay Lightning	NHL	64	10	11	21	46	—	—	—	—	—
2001–02	Phoenix Coyotes	NHL	18	0	3	3	8	—	—	—	—	—
2001–02	Springfield Falcons	AHL	2	0	0	0	0	—	—	—	—	—
2001–02	Manitoba Moose	AHL	30	7	13	20	32	—	—	—	—	—
2001–02	Vancouver Canucks	NHL	14	2	4	6	12	6	1	0	1	2
2002–03	Vancouver Canucks	NHL	30	4	6	10	22	—	—	—	—	—
2002–03	Philadelphia Flyers	NHL	13	2	3	5	6	—	—	—	—	—
2002–03	Nashville Predators	NHL	6	0	1	1	4	—	—	—	—	—
2003–04	Jokerit	SM-l	13	5	1	6	8	8	0	2	2	29
2004–05	HC Forward-Morges	NLB	44	23	33	56	136	—	—	—	—	—
2005–06	Hannover Scorpions	DEL	50	15	26	41	148	10	1	1	2	32
2006–07	Hannover Scorpions	DEL	14	1	7	8	24	—	—	—	—	—
2007–08	Kölner Haie	DEL	39	18	23	41	108	14	3	6	9	38
2008–09	Kölner Haie	DEL	34	5	12	17	185	—	—	—	—	—
NHL totals			453	65	89	154	249	21	2	1	3	6

=== International ===
Year	Team	Event	GP	G	A	Pts	PIM
1994	Canada	OG	4	1	1	2	0

== Broadcasting career ==
Beginning in the 2012-13 season, Warriner became a colour commentator for TVCogeco's coverage of the Windsor Spitfires. As of 2015, Warriner was a commentator for Sportsnet.

== Coaching career ==
On December 31, 2023, it was announced that the Hanover Indians were hiring Warriner as head coach. On May 10, 2024 it was announced that the Tilburg Trappers were hiring Warriner as head coach. On April 11, 2025, it was announced that Warriner will be the new head coach at ESV Kaufbeuren in the DEL2.

Preceded by Eric Lindros	Quebec Nordiques first-round draft pick 1992	Succeeded by Jocelyn Thibault
