= Denis Pederson =

Canadian ice hockey player (born 1975)

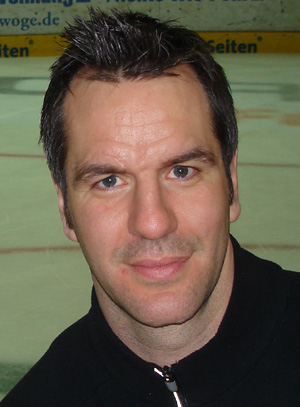
- Born: September 10, 1975 (age 50) Prince Albert, Saskatchewan, Canada
- Height: 6 ft 2 in (188 cm)
- Weight: 205 lb (93 kg; 14 st 9 lb)
- Position: Centre/Right wing
- Shot: Right
- Played for: New Jersey Devils; Vancouver Canucks; Phoenix Coyotes; Nashville Predators; Eisbären Berlin
- National team: Canada
- NHL draft: 13th overall, 1993; New Jersey Devils
- Playing career: 1995–2012

Denis Erio Pederson (born September 10, 1975) is a Canadian former professional ice hockey player. He played a total of 435 games in the National Hockey League and then went on to great success playing for Eisbären Berlin in Germany.

== Playing career ==
A native of Prince Albert, Saskatchewan, Pederson played for the Carlton Park Mustangs and joined his hometown team Prince Albert Raiders when he was 16 years old.

He was selected by the New Jersey Devils in the 1993 NHL Draft (first round, 13th overall). He continued playing for the Raiders in the WHL and also spent time with AHL’s Albany River Rats, before making his NHL debut with the Devils during the 1995-96 season.

In 2000, he was traded along with Brendan Morrison from the New Jersey Devils to the Vancouver Canucks in exchange for Alexander Mogilny.

Until 2003, he played 435 games in the National Hockey League for the New Jersey Devils, Vancouver Canucks, Phoenix Coyotes and Nashville Predators.

From 2003 to 2012, Pederson played for Eisbären Berlin of the German top-flight Deutsche Eishockey Liga (DEL) and won six German championships as well as the 2010 European Trophy with the team. He had his jersey number 20 retired by the Berlin club in December 2015.

Pederson was inducted into the Prince Albert Sports Hall of Fame in 2015.

== Career statistics ==
=== Regular season and playoffs ===
			Regular season					Playoffs
Season	Team	League	GP	G	A	Pts	PIM	GP	G	A	Pts	PIM
1990–91	Prince Albert Raiders AAA	SMHL	30	25	17	42	84	—	—	—	—	—
1991–92	Prince Albert Raiders AAA	SMHL	21	33	25	58	40	—	—	—	—	—
1991–92	Prince Albert Raiders	WHL	10	0	0	0	6	7	0	1	1	13
1992–93	Prince Albert Raiders	WHL	72	33	40	73	134	—	—	—	—	—
1993–94	Prince Albert Raiders	WHL	71	53	45	98	157	—	—	—	—	—
1994–95	Prince Albert Raiders	WHL	63	30	38	68	122	15	11	14	25	14
1994–95	Albany River Rats	AHL	—	—	—	—	—	3	0	0	0	2
1995–96	Albany River Rats	AHL	68	28	43	71	104	4	1	2	3	0
1995–96	New Jersey Devils	NHL	10	3	1	4	0	—	—	—	—	—
1996–97	Albany River Rats	AHL	3	1	3	4	7	—	—	—	—	—
1996–97	New Jersey Devils	NHL	70	12	20	32	62	9	0	0	0	2
1997–98	New Jersey Devils	NHL	80	15	13	28	97	6	1	1	2	2
1998–99	New Jersey Devils	NHL	76	11	12	23	66	3	0	1	1	0
1999–2000	New Jersey Devils	NHL	35	3	3	6	16	—	—	—	—	—
1999–2000	Vancouver Canucks	NHL	12	3	2	5	2	—	—	—	—	—
2000–01	Vancouver Canucks	NHL	61	4	8	12	65	4	0	1	1	4
2001–02	Vancouver Canucks	NHL	29	1	5	6	31	—	—	—	—	—
2001–02	Phoenix Coyotes	NHL	19	1	1	2	20	5	0	2	2	0
2002–03	Nashville Predators	NHL	43	4	6	10	39	—	—	—	—	—
2003–04	Eisbären Berlin	DEL	41	15	21	36	40	11	5	6	11	8
2004–05	Eisbären Berlin	DEL	49	19	19	38	75	12	7	4	11	20
2005–06	Eisbären Berlin	DEL	49	17	24	41	96	11	5	7	12	16
2006–07	Peoria Rivermen	AHL	1	0	0	0	0	—	—	—	—	—
2006–07	Eisbären Berlin	DEL	29	13	15	28	84	2	0	1	1	4
2007–08	Eisbären Berlin	DEL	25	13	18	31	55	12	5	5	10	12
2008–09	Eisbären Berlin	DEL	52	19	34	53	32	12	4	5	9	12
2009–10	Eisbären Berlin	DEL	54	19	33	52	75	5	2	0	2	0
2010–11	Eisbären Berlin	DEL	46	16	21	37	68	—	—	—	—	—
2011–12	Eisbären Berlin	DEL	3	0	1	1	2	—	—	—	—	—
NHL totals			435	57	71	128	398	27	1	5	6	8
DEL totals			348	131	186	317	527	65	28	28	56	72

=== International ===
Medal record

Representing Canada

Ice hockey

World Junior Championships
Gold medal – first place	1995 Red Deer	

Year	Team	Event	GP	G	A	Pts	PIM
1995	Canada	WJC	7	2	2	4	0
Junior totals			7	2	2	4	0

== Awards ==
- WHL East Second All-Star Team – 1994

Preceded by Jason Smith	New Jersey Devils first-round draft pick 1993	Succeeded by Vadim Sharifijanov
