= Christian Berglund =

Swedish ice hockey player (born 1980)

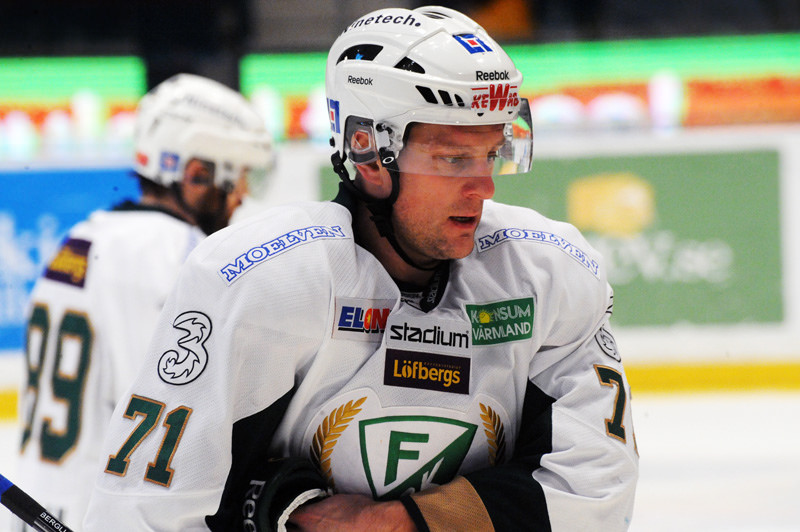
- Born: March 12, 1980 (age 46) Örebro, Sweden
- Height: 5 ft 11 in (180 cm)
- Weight: 195 lb (88 kg; 13 st 13 lb)
- Position: Left wing
- Shot: Left
- Played for: Färjestad BK; New Jersey Devils; Florida Panthers; Rapperswil-Jona Lakers; SC Bern
- NHL draft: 37th overall, 1998; New Jersey Devils
- Playing career: 1998–2016

Christian Jonas Berglund (born March 12, 1980) is a Swedish retired professional ice hockey left winger. He last played for BIK Karlskoga in HockeyAllsvenskan, Sweden's second-tier league. Earlier in his career, he also competed in the National Hockey League (NHL) with the New Jersey Devils and the Florida Panthers.

== Playing career ==
Berglund started his hockey career playing in the Swedish Elite League with Färjestads BK and representing Sweden in World Junior Championship tournaments. He was selected in the second round, 37th overall, by the New Jersey Devils in the 1998 NHL entry draft as their third pick. Berglund remained with Färjestad until 2001, when he signed with the Devils. He initially played for their AHL affiliate, the Albany River Rats, before joining the Devils later that same season. On March 1, 2004, he was traded along with Victor Uchevatov to the Florida Panthers in exchange for Viktor Kozlov.

During the 2004–05 NHL lockout, which saw the cancellation of the entire NHL season, Berglund returned to his homeland to continue playing competitive hockey. He rejoined his former club, Färjestad BK, in the Swedish Elite League (Elitserien). Following that year, in the summer of 2005, Berglund opted to further his career in Switzerland by signing with the SC Rapperswil-Jona Lakers of the National League (NLA). He became a key player for the Lakers over the next five seasons, establishing himself as a consistent scorer and veteran presence. On April 21, 2010, Berglund decided to return once again to his original Swedish club, Färjestad, signing a four-year contract to bring his experience and leadership back to the team. After completing his career with Färjestad and later BIK Karlskoga in the HockeyAllsvenskan, Berglund officially announced his retirement from professional hockey on March 9, 2016.

== Career statistics ==
=== Regular season and playoffs ===
			Regular season					Playoffs
Season	Team	League	GP	G	A	Pts	PIM	GP	G	A	Pts	PIM
1994–95	Karlskoga HC	SWE.4	20	14	13	27	—	—	—	—	—	—
1995–96	Kristinehamns HT	SWE.3	23	8	8	16	12	—	—	—	—	—
1996–97	Färjestads BK	J20	21	2	3	5	24	—	—	—	—	—
1997–98	Färjestads BK	J20	29	23	19	42	68	—	—	—	—	—
1997–98	Färjestads BK	SEL	1	0	0	0	0	—	—	—	—	—
1998–99	Färjestads BK	J20	15	11	13	24	54	—	—	—	—	—
1998–99	Färjestads BK	SEL	37	2	4	6	37	4	1	0	1	4
1998–99	IF Troja/Ljungby	Div.1	3	1	0	1	2	—	—	—	—	—
1999–2000	Färjestads BK	J20	5	3	5	8	8	—	—	—	—	—
1999–2000	Bofors IK	Allsv	6	2	0	2	12	—	—	—	—	—
1999–2000	Färjestads BK	SEL	43	8	6	14	44	7	2	1	3	10
2000–01	Färjestads BK	SEL	49	17	20	37	142	16	7	7	14	22
2001–02	Albany River Rats	AHL	60	21	26	47	69	—	—	—	—	—
2001–02	New Jersey Devils	NHL	15	2	7	9	8	3	0	0	0	2
2002–03	Albany River Rats	AHL	26	6	14	20	57	—	—	—	—	—
2002–03	New Jersey Devils	NHL	38	4	5	9	20	—	—	—	—	—
2003–04	New Jersey Devils	NHL	23	2	3	5	4	—	—	—	—	—
2003–04	Florida Panthers	NHL	10	3	1	4	10	—	—	—	—	—
2004–05	Färjestads BK	SEL	48	7	13	20	97	14	2	3	5	56
2005–06	Rapperswil–Jona Lakers	NLA	44	24	20	44	124	11	4	8	12	63
2006–07	SC Bern	NLA	42	17	25	42	97	16	5	5	10	18
2007–08	SC Bern	NLA	48	13	20	45	80	6	0	4	4	4
2008–09	Rapperswil–Jona Lakers	NLA	49	22	25	47	80	—	—	—	—	—
2009–10	Rapperswil–Jona Lakers	NLA	43	23	21	44	75	—	—	—	—	—
2010–11	Färjestads BK	SEL	51	17	15	32	68	11	2	6	8	2
2011–12	Färjestads BK	SEL	53	16	11	27	61	11	3	3	6	8
2012–13	Färjestads BK	SEL	51	15	22	37	103	10	2	1	3	10
2013–14	Färjestads BK	SHL	38	8	10	18	77	15	1	1	2	57
2014–15	BIK Karlskoga	Allsv	43	9	12	21	26	2	0	0	0	14
2015–16	BIK Karlskoga	Allsv	46	12	8	20	53	4	0	2	2	6
2016–17	HC Flyers	SWE.4	1	2	1	3	0	—	—	—	—	—
SHL totals			371	90	101	191	629	88	20	22	42	169
NHL totals			86	11	16	27	42	3	0	0	0	2
NLA totals			226	99	123	222	456	33	9	17	26	85

=== International ===
Year	Team	Event	Result	GP	G	A	Pts	PIM
1998	Sweden	EJC	1st place, gold medalist(s)	6	4	4	8	10
1999	Sweden	WJC	4th	6	4	4	8	33
2000	Sweden	WJC	5th	7	4	2	6	4
Junior totals				19	12	10	22	47
