= Zbyněk Novák =

Czech ice hockey forward

- Born: July 23, 1983 (age 42)
- Height: 6 ft 3 in (191 cm)
- Weight: 254 lb (115 kg; 18 st 2 lb)
- Position: Forward
- Shot: Left
- Played for: HC Slavia Praha
- NHL draft: 191st overall, 2001; Washington Capitals
- Playing career: 2001–2017

Zbyněk Novák (born July 23, 1983) is a Czech former professional ice hockey forward.

Novák played 43 games in the Czech Extraliga for HC Slavia Praha between 2001 and 2003. He was drafted 191st overall by the Washington Capitals in the 2001 NHL entry draft but he remained in the Czech Republic throughout his career.

Novák represented the Czech Republic at junior level, playing in the 2001 IIHF World U18 Championships and the 2003 World Junior Ice Hockey Championships.

== Career statistics ==
=== Regular season and playoffs ===
			Regular season					Playoffs
Season	Team	League	GP	G	A	Pts	PIM	GP	G	A	Pts	PIM
1999–2000	HC Slavia Praha	CZE U18	31	14	12	26	12	—	—	—	—	—
1999–2000	HC Slavia Praha	CZE U20	13	0	2	2	8	2	1	0	1	0
2000–01	HC Slavia Praha	CZE U20	44	10	8	18	24	3	1	0	1	2
2001–02	HC Slavia Praha	CZE U20	23	11	12	23	8	—	—	—	—	—
2001–02	HC Slavia Praha	ELH	27	0	1	1	2	—	—	—	—	—
2001–02	HC Rebel Havlíčkův Brod	CZE.3	5	0	2	2	0	2	1	0	1	2
2002–03	HC Slavia Praha	CZE U20	3	1	1	2	2	2	1	0	1	4
2002–03	HC Slavia Praha	ELH	10	1	0	1	0	6	0	0	0	0
2002–03	HC Berounští Medvědi	CZE.2	29	4	7	11	14	—	—	—	—	—
2003–04	HC Havířov Panthers	CZE U20	6	0	0	0	6	—	—	—	—	—
2003–04	HC Lasselsberger Plzeň	CZE U20	34	13	18	31	36	—	—	—	—	—
2003–04	HC Havířov Panthers	CZE.2	5	0	0	0	5	—	—	—	—	—
2005–06	HC Kobra Praha	CZE.3	32	8	6	14	53	3	0	0	0	0
2006–07	HC Kobra Praha	CZE.3	42	15	15	30	38	3	0	1	1	0
2007–08	HC Kobra Praha	CZE.3	34	7	9	16	38	—	—	—	—	—
2008–09	HC Kobra Praha	CZE.3	37	8	9	17	112	—	—	—	—	—
2009–10	HC Kobra Praha	CZE.3	30	5	8	13	89	4	0	3	3	14
2010–11	HC Kobra Praha	CZE.3	31	7	3	10	86	—	—	—	—	—
2011–12	HC Kobra Praha	CZE.3	6	0	1	1	2	—	—	—	—	—
2012–13	HC Kobra Praha	CZE.3	20	6	8	14	52	—	—	—	—	—
2014–15	HC Jesenice	CZE.4	16	13	9	22		—	—	—	—	—
2015–16	HC Jesenice	CZE.4	19	5	17	22	22	—	—	—	—	—
2016–17	HC Jesenice	CZE.4	22	10	9	19	30	—	—	—	—	—
ELH totals			37	1	1	2	2	6	0	0	0	0
CZE.3 totals			237	57	60	117	470	12	1	4	5	16

=== International ===
Year	Team	Event	GP	G	A	Pts	PIM
2000	Czech Republic	U17	5	0	1	1
2001	Czech Republic	WJC18	7	0	2	2	6
2003	Czech Republic	WJC	6	0	0	0	4
Junior totals			18	0	3	3	10
