= Viitanen =

Viitanen is a Finnish surname.

== Geographical distribution ==
As of 2014, 94.5% of all known bearers of the surname Viitanen were residents of Finland (frequency 1:986) and 2.7% of Sweden (1:61,929).

In Finland, the frequency of the surname was higher than national average (1:986) in the following regions:

1. Pirkanmaa (1:365)
2. Satakunta (1:401)
3. Tavastia Proper (1:526)
4. Southwest Finland (1:796)
5. Central Finland (1:875)
6. South Ostrobothnia (1:960)

== People ==
- Arvo Viitanen (1924–1999), Finnish cross-country skier
- Mikko Viitanen (born 1982), Finnish ice hockey player
- Pia Viitanen (born 1967), Finnish politician
