= Ketola =

Ketola is a Finnish surname. Notable people with the surname include:

- Helen Ketola (1931–2016), American baseball player
- Juha-Pekka Ketola (born 1983), Finnish ice hockey player
- Tuomas Ketola (born 1975), Finnish tennis player
- Veli-Pekka Ketola (born 1948), Finnish ice hockey player and coach
