= Juha-Pekka Ketola =

Finnish ice hockey centre

- Born: January 21, 1983 (age 43) Rauma, Finland
- Height: 6 ft 2 in (188 cm)
- Weight: 190 lb (86 kg; 13 st 8 lb)
- Position: Centre
- Shot: Left
- Played for: Ässät
- NHL draft: 287th overall, 2001; New York Islanders
- Playing career: 2003–2007

Juha-Pekka Ketola (born January 21, 1983) is a Finnish former professional ice hockey centre.

== Playing career ==
Born in Rauma, Ketola began his playing career at junior level with his hometown team Lukko, during which he was drafted 287th overall by the New York Islanders in the 2001 NHL entry draft. Following his draft selection, Ketola sought to gain North American experience and joined the Sherbrooke Castors of the Quebec Major Junior Hockey League for the 2001–02 season. He managed just eight goals in 62 games in his only season in North America before returning to Lukko's junior team the following year.

In 2003, Ketola joined Ässät and went on play 83 regular season games over two seasons, scoring three goals and registering one assist. He departed in 2005 to join Hokki of Mestis for one season before moving to France to play for Division 1 team Bisons de Neuilly-sur-Marne.

== Career statistics ==
=== Regular season and playoffs ===
| | | | Regular season | | | | | Playoffs |
| Season | Team | League | GP | G | A | Pts | PIM | GP | G | A | Pts | PIM |
|---|---|---|---|---|---|---|---|---|---|---|---|---|
| 1998–99 | Lukko | FIN U18 | 12 | 1 | 5 | 6 | 12 | — | — | — | — | — |
| 1998–99 | Lukko | FIN U20 | 3 | 0 | 0 | 0 | 2 | — | — | — | — | — |
| 1999–2000 | Lukko | FIN U18 | 34 | 5 | 16 | 21 | 38 | — | — | — | — | — |
| 1999–2000 | Lukko | FIN U20 | 3 | 1 | 0 | 1 | 0 | — | — | — | — | — |
| 2000–01 | Lukko | FIN U18 | 9 | 3 | 6 | 9 | 28 | — | — | — | — | — |
| 2000–01 | Lukko | FIN U20 | 41 | 6 | 10 | 16 | 34 | 3 | 0 | 0 | 0 | 2 |
| 2001–02 | Sherbrooke Castors | QMJHL | 67 | 8 | 27 | 35 | 58 | — | — | — | — | — |
| 2002–03 | Lukko | FIN U20 | 19 | 2 | 12 | 14 | 73 | — | — | — | — | — |
| 2002–03 | UJK | QMJHL | 6 | 2 | 0 | 2 | 35 | — | — | — | — | — |
| 2003–04 | Ässät | FIN U20 | 11 | 1 | 5 | 6 | 32 | — | — | — | — | — |
| 2003–04 | Ässät | SM-liiga | 44 | 2 | 1 | 3 | 34 | — | — | — | — | — |
| 2004–05 | Ässät | SM-liiga | 39 | 1 | 0 | 1 | 28 | 2 | 0 | 0 | 0 | 2 |
| 2005–06 | Hokki | Mestis | 39 | 6 | 6 | 12 | 60 | 1 | 0 | 0 | 0 | 0 |
| 2006–07 | Bisons de Neuilly–sur–Marne | FRA.2 | 18 | 7 | 7 | 14 | 116 | — | — | — | — | — |
| SM-liiga totals | | | 83 | 3 | 1 | 4 | 62 | 2 | 0 | 0 | 0 | 2 |

=== International ===
| Year | Team | Event | GP | G | A | Pts | PIM |
|---|---|---|---|---|---|---|---|
| 2000 | Finland | U17 | 3 | 1 | 1 | 2 | 2 |
| 2001 | Finland | WJC18 | 6 | 1 | 2 | 3 | 2 |
| Junior totals | | | 9 | 2 | 3 | 5 | 4 |
