= Vladimir Korsunov =

Russian ice hockey player (born 1983)

- Born: March 16, 1983 (age 43) Odintsovo, Russian SFSR, USSR
- Height: 6 ft 1 in (185 cm)
- Weight: 192 lb (87 kg; 13 st 10 lb)
- Position: Defence
- Shot: Left
- Played for: HC Spartak Moscow; Khimik Voskresensk; HC Rys; HC Yugra; Rubin Tyumen; HC Kuban; Kazzinc-Torpedo; THK Tver; PSK Sakhalin
- NHL draft: 105th overall, 2001; Mighty Ducks of Anaheim
- Playing career: 2000–2017

Vladimir Korsunov (born March 16, 1983) is a Russian former professional ice hockey defenceman. He last played for PSK Sakhalin in Asia League Ice Hockey. He played 185 games in the Russian Superleague for HC Spartak Moscow.

He was drafted 105th overall by the Mighty Ducks of Anaheim in the 2001 NHL entry draft.

== Career statistics ==
=== Regular season and playoffs ===
			Regular season					Playoffs
Season	Team	League	GP	G	A	Pts	PIM	GP	G	A	Pts	PIM
1999–2000	Spartak–2 Moscow	RUS.3	22	1	11	12	60	—	—	—	—	—
2000–01	Spartak Moscow	RUS.2	10	0	0	0	2	—	—	—	—	—
2000–01	Spartak–2 Moscow	RUS.3	31	5	19	24	90	—	—	—	—	—
2001–02	Spartak Moscow	RSL	40	0	3	3	28	—	—	—	—	—
2001–02	Spartak–2 Moscow	RUS.3	3	1	0	1	8	—	—	—	—	—
2002–03	Spartak Moscow	RSL	42	1	4	5	50	—	—	—	—	—
2002–03	Spartak–2 Moscow	RUS.3	1	0	0	0	0	—	—	—	—	—
2003–04	Spartak Moscow	RUS.2	56	1	8	9	66	5	1	0	1	6
2004–05	Spartak Moscow	RSL	43	4	7	11	54	—	—	—	—	—
2004–05	Spartak–2 Moscow	RUS.3	4	2	2	4	6	—	—	—	—	—
2005–06	Spartak Moscow	RSL	42	0	6	6	36	3	0	0	0	2
2005–06	Spartak–2 Moscow	RUS.3	6	0	2	2	10	—	—	—	—	—
2006–07	Khimik Voskresensk	RUS.2	48	5	19	24	105	14	2	1	3	18
2007–08	Spartak Moscow	RSL	18	0	0	0	12	1	0	0	0	0
2007–08	Spartak–2 Moscow	RUS.3	25	2	14	16	94	—	—	—	—	—
2008–09	HC Rys	RUS.2	23	0	4	4	24	—	—	—	—	—
2009–10	HC Yugra	RUS.2	41	1	9	10	38	17	2	1	3	14
2010–11	Rubin Tyumen	VHL	50	6	9	15	52	6	0	0	0	4
2011–12	Rubin Tyumen	VHL	48	5	13	18	75	16	1	3	4	30
2012–13	HC Kuban	VHL	32	3	3	6	16	—	—	—	—	—
2013–14	Kazzinc–Torpedo	VHL	44	4	11	15	54	—	—	—	—	—
2014–15	THK Tver	VHL	42	2	13	15	81	15	0	3	3	12
2015–16	THK Tver	VHL	32	6	10	16	54	11	0	1	1	12
2016–17	PSK Sakhalin	ALH	48	8	31	39	42	7	0	4	4	6
RUS.2 totals			178	7	40	47	235	36	5	2	7	38
RSL totals			185	5	20	25	180	4	0	0	0	2
VHL totals			248	26	59	85	332	48	1	7	8	58

=== International ===
Year	Team	Event	GP	G	A	Pts	PIM
2000	Russia	U17	6	0	3	3	0
2001	Russia	WJC18	6	0	3	3	10
2002	Russia	WJC	7	0	2	2	6
Junior totals			19	0	8	8	16
