= 2001 NHL entry draft =

2001 North American ice hockey draft

General information
- Date: June 23–24, 2001
- Location: National Car Rental Center; Sunrise, Florida, U.S.

Overview
- 289 total selections in 9 rounds
- First selection: (Russia) Ilya Kovalchuk (Atlanta Thrashers)

The 2001 NHL entry draft was the 39th draft for the National Hockey League. It was held on June 23 and 24, 2001, at the National Car Rental Center in Sunrise, Florida.

The last active player in the NHL from the 2001 draft class was Craig Anderson, who retired after the 2022–23 season, though he had previously been drafted in 1999.

== Final central scouting rankings ==
=== Skaters ===
	North American	European
1	(Canada) Jason Spezza (C)	(Russia) Ilya Kovalchuk (LW)
2	(Canada) Dan Hamhuis (D)	(Russia) Alexander Svitov (C)
3	(Canada) Stephen Weiss (C)	(Russia) Stanislav Chistov (LW)
4	(United States) Mike Komisarek (D)	(Finland) Mikko Koivu (C)
5	(United States) R. J. Umberger (C)	(Finland) Tuomo Ruutu (LW)
6	(Czech Republic) Lukas Krajicek (D)	(Russia) Kirill Koltsov (D)
7	(Canada) Duncan Milroy (RW)	(Russia) Igor Knyazev (D)
8	(Canada) Colby Armstrong (RW)	(Russia) Alexander Polushin (LW)
9	(Czech Republic) Ales Hemsky (RW)	(Sweden) Fredrik Sjostrom (RW)
10	(Canada) Carlo Colaiacovo (D)	(Russia) Alexander Perezhogin (RW)

=== Goaltenders ===
	North American	European
1	(Canada) Pascal Leclaire	(Czech Republic) Tomas Duba
2	(Canada) Dan Blackburn	(Russia) Andrei Medvedev
3	(Canada) Michael Garnett	(Germany) Dimitri Patzold

== Selections by round ==
= NHL All-Star team ·	= NHL All-Star (Note: Players are identified as an All-Star if they were selected for the All-Star game at any time in their career.) ·	= NHL All-Star and NHL All-Star team ·

Teams are in North America unless otherwise noted.

=== Round one ===
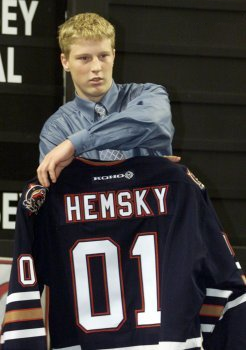
Ales Hemsky was selected 13th overall by the Edmonton Oilers.

Pick	Player	Nationality	NHL team	College/junior/club team
1	Ilya Kovalchuk (LW)	Russia	Atlanta Thrashers	Spartak Moscow (Russia)
2	Jason Spezza (C)	Canada	Ottawa Senators (from NY Islanders)^{1}	Windsor Spitfires (OHL)
3	Alexander Svitov (C)	Russia	Tampa Bay Lightning	Avangard Omsk (Russia)
4	Stephen Weiss (C)	Canada	Florida Panthers	Plymouth Whalers (OHL)
5	Stanislav Chistov (LW)	Russia	Mighty Ducks of Anaheim	Avangard Omsk (Russia)
6	Mikko Koivu (C)	Finland	Minnesota Wild	TPS (Finland)
7	Mike Komisarek (D)	United States	Montreal Canadiens	University of Michigan (NCAA)
8	Pascal Leclaire (G)	Canada	Columbus Blue Jackets	Halifax Mooseheads (QMJHL)
9	Tuomo Ruutu (C)	Finland	Chicago Blackhawks	Jokerit (Finland)
10	Dan Blackburn (G)	Canada	New York Rangers	Kootenay Ice (WHL)
11	Fredrik Sjostrom (RW)	Sweden	Phoenix Coyotes (from Calgary)^{2}	Frölunda HC (Sweden)
12	Dan Hamhuis (D)	Canada	Nashville Predators	Prince George Cougars (WHL)
13	Ales Hemsky (RW)	Czech Republic	Edmonton Oilers (from Boston)^{3}	Hull Olympiques (QMJHL)
14	Chuck Kobasew (RW)	Canada	Calgary Flames (from Phoenix)^{4}	Boston College (NCAA)
15	Igor Knyazev (D)	Russia	Carolina Hurricanes	Spartak Moscow (Russia)
16	R. J. Umberger (RW)	United States	Vancouver Canucks	Ohio State University (CCHA)
17	Carlo Colaiacovo (D)	Canada	Toronto Maple Leafs	Erie Otters (OHL)
18	Jens Karlsson (LW)	Sweden	Los Angeles Kings	Frölunda HC (Sweden)
19	Shaone Morrisonn (D)	Canada	Boston Bruins (from Edmonton)^{5}	Kamloops Blazers (WHL)
20	Marcel Goc (C)	Germany	San Jose Sharks	Schwenninger Wild Wings (DEL)
21	Colby Armstrong (RW)	Canada	Pittsburgh Penguins	Red Deer Rebels (WHL)
22	Jiri Novotny (C)	Czech Republic	Buffalo Sabres	HC České Budějovice (Czech Republic)
23	Tim Gleason (D)	United States	Ottawa Senators (from Philadelphia via Tampa Bay, compensatory and Philadelphia)^{6}	Windsor Spitfires (OHL)
24	Lukas Krajicek (D)	Czech Republic	Florida Panthers (from St. Louis via New Jersey)^{7}	Peterborough Petes (OHL)
25	Alexander Perezhogin (RW)	Russia	Montreal Canadiens (from Washington)^{8}	Avangard Omsk (Russia)
26	Jason Bacashihua (G)	United States	Dallas Stars	Chicago Freeze (NAHL)
27	Jeff Woywitka (D)	Canada	Philadelphia Flyers (from Ottawa)^{9}	Red Deer Rebels (WHL)
28	Adrian Foster (C)	Canada	New Jersey Devils	Saskatoon Blades (WHL)
29	Adam Munro (G)	Canada	Chicago Blackhawks (from Detroit)^{10}	Erie Otters (OHL)
30	Dave Steckel (C)	United States	Los Angeles Kings (from Colorado)^{11}	Ohio State University (NCAA)

1. The Islanders' first-round pick went to Ottawa as the result of a trade on June 23, 2001, that sent Alexei Yashin to the Islanders in exchange for Zdeno Chara, Bill Muckalt and this pick.
2. Calgary's first-round pick went to Phoenix as the result of a trade on June 23, 2001, that sent a first-round pick (# 14 overall) and a second-round pick in the 2001 Entry Draft to Calgary in exchange for this pick.
3. Boston's first-round pick went to Edmonton as the result of a trade on November 10, 2000, that sent Bill Guerin to Boston in exchange for Anson Carter and a second-round pick in 2001 Entry Draft. Edmonton also had an option to swap first-round picks in the 2001 Entry Draft (this pick).
4. Phoenix's first-round pick went to Calgary as the result of a trade on June 23, 2001, that sent a first-round pick (# 11 overall) to Phoenix in exchange for a second-round pick in the 2001 Entry Draft and this pick.
5. Edmonton's first-round pick went to Boston as the result of a trade on November 10, 2000, that sent Anson Carter and a second-round pick in 2001 Entry Draft in exchange for Bill Guerin. Edmonton also had an option to swap first-round picks in the 2001 Entry Draft (this pick).
6. Philadelphia's first-round pick went to Ottawa as the result of a trade on June 23, 2001, that sent a first-round pick (# 27 overall) and a seventh-round pick in the 2001 Entry Draft along with a second-round pick the 2002 entry draft to Philadelphia in exchange for this pick.
  Philadelphia's first-round pick was re-acquired as the result of a trade on August 20, 1997, that sent Karl Dykhuis and Mikael Renberg to Tampa Bay in exchange for first-round picks in the 1998 entry draft, 1999 entry draft and 2001 Entry Draft along with this pick.
  Tampa Bay previously acquired this pick along with first-round picks in the 1998 entry draft, 1999 entry draft and 2001 Entry Draft as compensation on August 20, 1997, after Philadelphia signed Group II free agent Chris Gratton.
7. New Jersey's acquired first-round pick went to Florida as the result of a trade on June 23, 2001, that sent two second-round picks (# 44 & 48 overall) to New Jersey in exchange for this pick.
  New Jersey previously acquired this pick from St. Louis on January 4, 1999, as penalty for Scott Stevens tampering. New Jersey received an option to swap first-round picks with St. Louis between 1999 and 2003 Entry Drafts (subject to St. Louis deferring one time) and New Jersey's choice of a first-round pick between 1999 and 2003 Entry Drafts (this pick) and $1.425M in cash.
8. Washington's first-round pick went to Montreal as the result of a trade on March 13, 2001, that sent Trevor Linden, Dainius Zubrus and a second-round pick in the 2001 Entry Draft to Washington in exchange for Jan Bulis, Richard Zednik and this pick.
9. Ottawa's first-round pick went to Philadelphia as the result of a trade on June 23, 2001, that sent a first-round pick (# 23 overall) in the 2001 Entry Draft to Ottawa in exchange for a seventh-round pick in the 2001 Entry Draft, a second-round pick the 2002 entry draft and this pick.
10. Detroit's first-round pick went to Chicago as the result of a trade on March 23, 1999, that sent Chris Chelios to Detroit in exchange for Anders Eriksson, a first-round pick in the 1999 entry draft and this pick.
11. Colorado's first-round pick went to Los Angeles as the result of a trade on February 21, 2001, that sent Rob Blake and Steven Reinprecht to Colorado in exchange for Adam Deadmarsh, Aaron Miller, first-round pick in the 2003 entry draft, future considerations (Jared Aulin) and this pick.

=== Round two ===
Pick	Player	Nationality	NHL team	College/junior/club team
31	Matthew Spiller (D)	Canada	Phoenix Coyotes (from NY Islanders via Tampa Bay)^{1}	Seattle Thunderbirds (WHL)
32	Derek Roy (C)	Canada	Buffalo Sabres (from Tampa Bay)^{2}	Kitchener Rangers (OHL)
33	Timofei Shishkanov (LW)	Russia	Nashville Predators (from Atlanta via Vancouver)^{3}	Spartak Moscow (Russia)
34	Greg Watson (LW)	Canada	Florida Panthers	Prince Albert Raiders (WHL)
35	Mark Popovic (D)	Canada	Mighty Ducks of Anaheim	Toronto St. Michael's Majors (OHL)
36	Kyle Wanvig (RW)	Canada	Minnesota Wild	Red Deer Rebels (WHL)
37	Duncan Milroy (RW)	Canada	Montreal Canadiens	Swift Current Broncos (WHL)
38	Tim Jackman (RW)	United States	Columbus Blue Jackets	Minnesota State Mankato (NCAA)
39	Karel Pilar (D)	Czech Republic	Toronto Maple Leafs (from Chicago)^{4}	HC Litvínov (Czech Republic)
40	Fedor Tyutin (D)	Russia	New York Rangers	SKA Saint Petersburg (Russia)
41	Andrei Taratukhin (C)	Russia	Calgary Flames (from Calgary via Anaheim and Phoenix)^{5}	Avangard Omsk (Russia)
42	Tomas Slovak (D)	Slovakia	Nashville Predators	HC Košice (Slovakia)
43	Doug Lynch (D)	Canada	Edmonton Oilers (from Boston)^{6}	Red Deer Rebels (WHL)
44	Igor Pohanka (C)	Slovakia	New Jersey Devils (from Phoenix via Florida)^{7}	Prince Albert Raiders (WHL)
45	Martin Podlesak (C)	Czech Republic	Phoenix Coyotes (compensatory)^{8}	Lethbridge Hurricanes (WHL)
46	Michael Zigomanis (C)	Canada	Carolina Hurricanes	Kingston Frontenacs (OHL)
47	Alexander Polushin (LW)	Russia	Tampa Bay Lightning (from Vancouver)^{9}	THK Tver (Russia)
48	Tuomas Pihlman (LW)	Finland	New Jersey Devils (from Vancouver; compensatory via Florida)^{10}	JYP (Finland)
49	Michael Cammalleri (C)	Canada	Los Angeles Kings (from Toronto)^{11}	University of Michigan (NCAA)
50	Chris Thorburn (C)	Canada	Buffalo Sabres (compensatory)^{12}	North Bay Centennials (OHL)
51	Jaroslav Bednar (C)	Czech Republic	Los Angeles Kings	HIFK (Finland)
52	Ed Caron (LW)	United States	Edmonton Oilers	Phillips Exeter Academy (USHS-NH)
53	Kiel McLeod (C)	Canada	Columbus Blue Jackets (from San Jose via Montreal)^{13}	Kelowna Rockets (WHL)
54	Noah Welch (D)	United States	Pittsburgh Penguins	Saint Sebastian's School (US High School-MA)
55	Jason Pominville (RW)	United States	Buffalo Sabres	Shawinigan Cataractes (QMJHL)
56	Andrei Medvedev (G)	Russia	Calgary Flames (from Philadelphia via Florida)^{14}	Spartak Moscow (Russia)
57	Jay McClement (C)	Canada	St. Louis Blues	Brampton Battalion (OHL)
58	Nathan Paetsch (C)	Canada	Washington Capitals	Moose Jaw Warriors (WHL)
59	Matt Keith (RW)	Canada	Chicago Blackhawks (from Dallas)^{15}	Spokane Chiefs (WHL)
60	Victor Uchevatov (D)	Russia	New Jersey Devils (from Ottawa)^{16}	Lokomotiv Yaroslavl (Russia)
61	Andreas Holmqvist (D)	Sweden	Tampa Bay Lightning (from New Jersey via Montreal and Washington)^{17}	Hammarby IF (Sweden)
62	Igor Grigorenko (RW)	Russia	Detroit Red Wings	Lada Togliatti (Russia)
63	Peter Budaj (G)	Slovakia	Colorado Avalanche	Toronto St. Michael's Majors (OHL)

1. Tampa Bay's acquired second-round pick went to Phoenix as the result of a trade on March 5, 2001, that sent Stanislav Neckar and the rights to Nikolai Khabibulin to Tampa Bay in exchange for Mike Johnson, Paul Mara, Ruslan Zainullin and this pick.
  Tampa Bay previously acquired this pick as the result of a trade on June 24, 2000, that sent a first-round, fourth-round and seven-round picks in the 2000 entry draft to the Islanders in exchange for Kevin Weekes, the rights to Kristian Kudroc and this pick.
2. Tampa Bay's second-round pick went to Buffalo as the result of a trade on March 9, 2000, that sent Brian Holzinger, Wayne Primeau, Cory Sarich and a third-round pick in the 2000 entry draft to Tampa Bay in exchange for Chris Gratton and this pick.
3. Vancouver's acquired second-round pick went to Nashville as the result of a trade on March 9, 2001, that sent Drake Berehowsky to Vancouver in exchange for this pick.
  Tampa Bay previously acquired this pick as the result of a trade on June 24, 2000, that sent a second-round pick in the 2000 entry draft and a third-round pick in the 2001 Entry Draft to Atlanta in exchange for a third-round pick in the 2001 Entry Draft and this pick.
4. Chicago's second-round pick went to Toronto as the result of a trade on October 8, 1999, that sent Sylvain Cote to Chicago in exchange for this pick.
5. Calgary's second-round pick was re-acquired as the result of a trade with Phoenix on June 23, 2001, that sent a first-round pick in the 2001 Entry Draft (# 11 overall) to Phoenix in exchange for a first-round pick in the 2001 Entry Draft (# 14 overall) and this pick.
  Phoenix previously acquired this pick as the result of a trade on June 19, 2001, that sent Keith Carney to Anaheim in exchange for this pick.
  Anaheim previously acquired this pick as the result of a trade on September 26, 1995, that sent the rights to Jordan Leopold to Calgary in exchange for Andrei Nazarov and this pick.
6. Boston's second-round pick went to Edmonton as the result of a trade on November 10, 2000, that sent Bill Guerin to Boston in exchange for Anson Carter and this pick. Edmonton also had an option to swap first-round picks in the 2001 Entry Draft.
7. Florida's acquired second-round pick went to New Jersey as the result of a trade on June 23, 2001, that sent a first-round pick in the 2001 Entry Draft to Florida in exchange for a second-round pick (# 48 overall) in the 2001 Entry Draft and this pick.
  Florida previously acquired this pick as the result of a trade on March 13, 2001, that sent Todd Simpson to Phoenix in exchange for this pick.
8. Phoenix acquired this pick as compensation after Phoenix could not sign their first-round pick of the 1999 entry draft, Scott Kelmen.
9. Vancouver's second-round pick went to Tampa Bay as the result of a trade on February 7, 2001, that sent Dan Cloutier to Vancouver in exchange for Adrian Aucoin and this pick.
10. Florida's acquired second-round pick went to New Jersey as the result of a trade on June 23, 2001, that sent a first-round pick in the 2001 Entry Draft to Florida in exchange for a second-round pick (# 44 overall) in the 2001 Entry Draft and this pick.
  Florida previously acquired this pick as the result of a trade on May 31, 2001, that sent Alex Auld to Vancouver in exchange for a third-round pick in the 2002 entry draft and this pick.
  Vancouver acquired this pick as the result of a compensation for the Rangers signing Mark Messier as a free agent on July 13, 2000.
11. Toronto's second-round pick went to Los Angeles as the result of a trade on March 13, 2001, that sent Aki Berg to Toronto in exchange for Adam Mair and this pick.
12. Buffalo acquired this pick as compensation after Buffalo could not sign their first-round pick of the 1999 entry draft, Barrett Heisten.
13. Montreal's acquired second-round pick went to Columbus as the result of a trade on June 23, 2000, to complete an agreement that Columbus selects Frederic Chabot in the 2000 NHL expansion draft in exchange for this pick.
  Montreal previously acquired this pick as the result of a trade on March 23, 1999, that sent Vincent Damphousse to San Jose in exchange for a fifth-round pick in the 1999 entry draft, a first-round pick in the 2000 entry draft and San Jose's option to a second-round pick in 2000 entry draft or 2001 Entry Draft (this pick).
14. Florida's acquired second-round pick went to Calgary as the result of a trade on June 23, 2001, that sent the Valeri Bure and Jason Wiemer to Florida in exchange for Rob Niedermayer and this pick.
  Florida previously acquired this pick as the result of a trade on June 23, 2001, that sent the rights to Jiri Dopita to Philadelphia in exchange for this pick.
15. Dallas' second-round pick went to Chicago as the result of a trade on February 8, 2000, that sent Sylvain Cote and Dave Manson to Dallas in exchange for Kevin Dean, Derek Plante and this pick.
16. Ottawa's second-round pick went to New Jersey as the result of a trade on June 23, 2001, that sent two third-round picks (# 81 & # 94 overall) in the 2001 Entry Draft to Ottawa in exchange for this pick.
17. Washington's acquired second-round pick went to Tampa Bay as the result of a trade on June 23, 2001, that sent a second-round pick in the 2002 entry draft to Washington in exchange for this pick.
  Washington previously acquired this pick as the result of a trade on March 13, 2001, that sent Jan Bulis, Richard Zednik and a first-round pick in the 2001 Entry Draft to Montreal in exchange for Trevor Linden, Dainius Zubrus and this pick.
  Montreal's previously acquired this pick as the result of a trade on March 1, 2000, that sent Vladimir Malakhov to New Jersey in exchange for Josh DeWolf, Sheldon Souray and this pick.

=== Round three ===
Pick	Player	Nationality	NHL team	College/junior/club team
64	Tomas Malec (D)	Slovakia	Florida Panthers (from New York Islanders)^{1}	Rimouski Océanic (QMJHL)
65	Brendan Bell (D)	Canada	Toronto Maple Leafs (from Tampa Bay via Washington)^{2}	Ottawa 67's (OHL)
66	Fedor Fedorov (LW)	Russia	Vancouver Canucks (from Atlanta)^{3}	Sudbury Wolves (OHL)
67	Robin Leblanc (RW)	Canada	New Jersey Devils (compensatory)^{4}	Baie-Comeau Drakkar (QMJHL)
68	Grant McNeill (D)	Canada	Florida Panthers	Prince Albert Raiders (WHL)
69	Joel Stepp (LW)	Canada	Mighty Ducks of Anaheim	Red Deer Rebels (WHL)
70	Yared Hagos (C)	Sweden	Dallas Stars (from Minnesota)^{5}	AIK (Sweden)
71	Tomas Plekanec (C)	Czech Republic	Montreal Canadiens	HC Rabat Kladno (Czech Republic)
72	Brandon Nolan (LW)	Canada	New Jersey Devils (from Columbus)^{6}	Oshawa Generals (OHL)
73	Craig Anderson (G)	United States	Chicago Blackhawks	Guelph Storm (OHL)
74	Chris Heid (D)	Canada	Minnesota Wild (from NY Rangers)^{7}	Spokane Chiefs (WHL)
75	Denis Platonov (RW)	Russia	Nashville Predators (from Calgary)^{8}	HC Saratov (Russia)
76	Oliver Setzinger (C)	Austria	Nashville Predators	Ilves (Finland)
77	Darren McLachlan (LW)	Canada	Boston Bruins	Seattle Thunderbirds (WHL)
78	Beat Forster (D)	Switzerland	Phoenix Coyotes (from Phoenix via New Jersey)^{9}	HC Davos (Switzerland)
79	Garth Murray (C)	Canada	New York Rangers (from Carolina via Minnesota)^{10}	Regina Pats (WHL)
80	Michael Garnett (G)	Canada	Atlanta Thrashers (from Vancouver)^{11}	Saskatoon Blades (WHL)
81	Neil Komadoski (D)	United States	Ottawa Senators (from New Jersey; compensatory)^{12}	University of Notre Dame (NCAA)
82	Jay Harrison (D)	Canada	Toronto Maple Leafs	Brampton Battalion (OHL)
83	Henrik Juntunen (RW)	Finland	Los Angeles Kings	Karpat (Finland)
84	Kenny Smith (D)	United States	Edmonton Oilers	Harvard University (NCAA)
85	Aaron Johnson (D)	Canada	Columbus Blue Jackets (from San Jose via Minnesota, Atlanta and Pittsburgh)^{13}	Rimouski Océanic (QMJHL)
86	Drew Fata (D)	Canada	Pittsburgh Penguins	St. Michael's Majors (OHL)
87	Per Mars (C)	Sweden	Columbus Blue Jackets (from Buffalo)^{14}	Brynäs IF (Sweden)
88	Nicolas Corbeil (C)	Canada	Toronto Maple Leafs (from Philadelphia via Chicago)^{15}	Sherbrooke Castors (QMJHL)
89	Tuomas Nissinen (G)	Finland	St. Louis Blues	KalPa (Finland)
90	Owen Fussey (RW)	Canada	Washington Capitals	Calgary Hitmen (WHL)
91	Kevin Estrada (LW)	Canada	Carolina Hurricanes (compensatory)^{16}	Chilliwack (BCJHL)
92	Anthony Aquino (RW)	Canada	Dallas Stars	Merrimack College (NCAA)
93	Stephane Veilleux (C)	Canada	Minnesota Wild (from Ottawa)^{17}	Val-d'Or Foreurs (QMJHL)
94	Evgeny Artyukhin (RW)	Russia	Tampa Bay Lightning (from New Jersey via Ottawa)^{18}	HC Podolsk (Russia)
95	Patrick Sharp (C)	Canada	Philadelphia Flyers (from Detroit via Nashville)^{19}	University of Vermont (NCAA)
96	Alexandre Rouleau (D)	Canada	Pittsburgh Penguins (compensatory)^{20}	Val-d'Or Foreurs (QMJHL)
97	Danny Bois (RW)	Canada	Colorado Avalanche	London Knights (OHL)

1. The Islanders' third-round pick went to Florida as a result of a trade on June 23, 2001, that sent a fourth-round pick in the 2001 Entry Draft and a third-round pick in the 2002 entry draft to the Islanders in exchange for this pick.
2. Washington's acquired third-round pick went to Toronto as the result of a trade on December 11, 2000, that sent Dmitri Khristich to Washington in exchange for this pick.
  Washington previously acquired this pick as the result of a trade on January 17, 2000, that sent Jaroslav Svejkovsky to Tampa Bay in exchange for a seventh-round pick in the 2000 entry draft and this pick.
3. Atlanta's third-round pick went to Vancouver as the result of a trade on June 24, 2000, that sent a second-round pick in the 2000 entry draft and a third-round pick (# 80 overall) in the 2001 Entry Draft to Atlanta in exchange for a second-round pick in the 2001 Entry Draft and this pick.
4. New Jersey acquired this pick as compensation after Phoenix signed free agent Claude Lemieux on December 5, 2000.
5. Minnesota's third-round pick went to Dallas as a result of a trade on June 25, 2000, that sent Aaron Gavey, Pavel Patera, an eighth-round pick in the 2000 entry draft and a fourth-round pick in the 2002 entry draft to Minnesota in exchange for Brad Lukowich, a ninth-round pick in the 2001 Entry Draft and this pick.
6. Columbus's third-round pick went to New Jersey as the result of a trade on June 12, 2000, that sent Krzysztof Oliwa and future considerations (Deron Quint) to Columbus in exchange for future considerations (Turner Stevenson) and this pick.
7. The Rangers' third-round pick went to Minnesota as the result of a trade on June 23, 2001, that sent a third-round pick in the 2001 Entry Draft (# 79 overall) and a fifth-round pick in the 2001 Entry Draft to the Rangers in exchange for this pick.
8. Calgary's third-round pick went to Nashville as the result of a trade on March 14, 2000, that sent Sergei Krivokrasov to Calgary in exchange for Cale Hulse and this pick.
9. Phoenix's third-round pick was re-acquired as the result of a trade on June 23, 2001, that sent a fourth-round pick in the 2001 Entry Draft and a third-round pick in the 2002 entry draft to New Jersey in exchange for this pick.
  New Jersey previously acquired this pick as the result of a trade on March 7, 2000, that sent Lyle Odelein to Phoenix in exchange for Deron Quint and this pick.
10. Minnesota's acquired third-round pick went to the Rangers as the result of a trade on June 23, 2001, that sent a third-round pick in the 2001 Entry Draft (# 74 overall) to Minnesota in exchange for a fifth-round pick in the 2001 Entry Draft and this pick.
  Minnesota previously acquired this pick as the result of a trade on March 1, 2001, that sent Scott Pellerin to Carolina in exchange for Askhat Rakhmatullin, a conditional pick in the 2002 entry draft and this pick.
11. Vancouver's third-round pick went to Atlanta as the result of a trade on June 24, 2000, that sent a second and a third-round (# 66 overall) picks in the 2001 Entry Draft to Vancouver in exchange for a second-round pick in the 2000 entry draft and this pick.
12. New Jersey's acquired third-round pick went to Ottawa as the result of a trade on June 23, 2001, that sent a second-round pick in the 2001 Entry Draft to New Jersey in exchange for a third-round pick (# 94 overall) in the 2001 Entry Draft and this pick.
  New Jersey previously acquired this pick as compensation after the Rangers signed free agent Vladimir Malakhov on July 10, 2000.
13. Pittsburgh's third-round pick went to Columbus as the result of a trade on January 14, 2001, that sent Krzysztof Oliwa to Pittsburgh in exchange for this pick.
  Pittsburgh previously acquired this pick as the result of a trade on January 14, 2001, that sent Jiri Slegr to Atlanta in exchange for this pick.
  Atlanta previously acquired this pick as the result of a trade on September 29, 2000, that sent Matt Johnson to Minnesota in exchange for this pick.
  Minnesota previously acquired this pick as the result of a trade on June 11, 2000, that sent an eight-round pick in the 2001 Entry Draft and future considerations (protection of Evgeni Nabokov in 2000 NHL expansion draft) to San Jose in exchange for Andy Sutton, a seventh-round pick in the 2000 entry draft and this pick.
14. Buffalo's third-round pick went to Columbus as the result of a trade on March 13, 2001, that sent Steve Heinze to Buffalo in exchange for this pick.
15. Chicago's acquired third-round pick went to Toronto as the result of a trade on June 23, 2001, that sent Igor Korolev to Chicago in exchange for this pick.
  Chicago previously acquired this pick as the result of a trade on March 13, 2001, that sent Dean McAmmond to Philadelphia in exchange for this pick.
16. Carolina acquired this pick as compensation after Toronto signed free agent Gary Roberts on July 4, 2000.
17. Ottawa's third-round pick went to Minnesota as the result of a trade on March 13, 2001, that sent Curtis Leschyshyn to Ottawa in exchange for a conditional pick in the 2002 entry draft (conditions of this draft pick are unknown) and this pick.
18. Ottawa's acquired third-round pick went to Tampa Bay as the result of a trade on June 23, 2001, that sent a fourth-round pick and seventh-round pick in the 2001 Entry Draft to Ottawa in exchange for this pick.
  Ottawa previously acquired this pick went as the result of a trade on June 23, 2001, that sent a second-round pick in the 2001 Entry Draft to New Jersey in exchange for a third-round pick (# 81 overall) in the 2001 Entry Draft and this pick.
19. Nashville's third-round pick went to Philadelphia as the result of a trade on September 29, 2000, that sent Mark Eaton to Nashville in exchange for this pick.
  Nashville previously acquired this pick as the result of a trade on June 24, 2000, that sent a fourth-round pick in the 2000 entry draft to Detroit in exchange for this pick.
20. Pittsburgh acquired this pick as compensation after Columbus signed free agent Ron Tugnutt on July 4, 2000.

=== Round four ===
Pick	Player	Nationality	NHL team	College/junior/club team
98	Jordin Tootoo (RW)	Canada	Nashville Predators (from New York Islanders via Philadelphia)^{1}	Brandon Wheat Kings (WHL)
99	Ray Emery (G)	Canada	Ottawa Senators (from Tampa Bay)^{2}	Sault Ste. Marie Greyhounds (OHL)
100	Brian Sipotz (D)	United States	Atlanta Thrashers	Miami University (NCAA)
101	Cory Stillman (C)	Canada	New York Islanders (from Florida)^{3}	Kingston Frontenacs (OHL)
102	Timo Parssinen (C)	Finland	Mighty Ducks of Anaheim	HPK (Finland)
103	Tony Virta (RW)	Finland	Minnesota Wild	TPS (Finland)
104	Brent MacLellan (D)	Canada	Chicago Blackhawks (from Montreal)^{4}	Rimouski Océanic (QMJHL)
105	Vladimir Korsunov (D)	Russia	Mighty Ducks of Anaheim (from Columbus)^{5}	Spartak Moscow (Russia)
106	Christian Ehrhoff (D)	Germany	San Jose Sharks (from Chicago)^{6}	Krefeld Pinguine (DEL)
107	Dimitri Patzold (G)	Germany	San Jose Sharks (from New York Rangers)^{7}	TSV Erding (Germany)
108	Tomi Maki (RW)	Finland	Calgary Flames	Jokerit (Finland)
109	Martti Jarventie (D)	Finland	Montreal Canadiens (compensatory)^{8}	TPS (Finland)
110	Rob Zepp (G)	Canada	Carolina Hurricanes (from Nashville via Philadelphia)^{9}	Plymouth Whalers (OHL)
111	Matti Kaltiainen (G)	Finland	Boston Bruins	Blues (Finland)
112	Milan Gajic (C)	Canada	Atlanta Thrashers (from Phoenix via New Jersey)^{10}	Burnaby Express (BCJHL)
113	Bryce Lampman (D)	United States	New York Rangers (from Carolina)^{11}	Omaha Lancers (USHL)
114	Evgeny Gladskikh (LW)	Russia	Vancouver Canucks	Metallurg Magnitogorsk (Russia)
115	Vladimir Gusev (D)	Russia	Chicago Blackhawks (from Toronto)^{12}	Khabarovsk (Russia)
116	Richard Petiot (D)	Canada	Los Angeles Kings	Camrose Kodiaks (AJHL)
117	Michael Woodford (RW)	United States	Florida Panthers (from Columbus; compensatory)^{13}	Cushing Academy (USHS-MA)
118	Brandon Rogers (D)	United States	Mighty Ducks of Anaheim (from Edmonton via Washington)^{14}	Hotchkiss School (USHS-CT)
119	Alexei Zotkin (LW)	Russia	Chicago Blackhawks (from San Jose)^{15}	Metallurg Magnitogorsk (Russia)
120	Tomas Surovy (LW)	Slovakia	Pittsburgh Penguins	HK Poprad (Slovakia)
121	Drew MacIntyre (G)	Canada	Detroit Red Wings (compensatory)^{16}	Sherbrooke Castors (QMJHL)
122	Igor Valeev (RW)	Russia	St. Louis Blues (from Buffalo via Atlanta)^{17}	North Bay Centennials (OHL)
123	Aaron Lobb (RW)	Canada	Tampa Bay Lightning (from Philadelphia)^{18}	London Knights (OHL)
124	Egor Shastin (LW)	Russia	Calgary Flames (from St. Louis)^{19}	Avangard Omsk (Russia)
125	Jeff Lucky (RW)	Canada	Washington Capitals	Spokane Chiefs (WHL)
126	Daniel Volrab (C)	Czech Republic	Dallas Stars	Sparta Prague (Czech Republic)
127	Christoph Schubert (D)	Germany	Ottawa Senators	Munich Barons (Germany)
128	Andrei Posnov (LW)	Russia	New Jersey Devils	Krylya Sovetov (Russia)
129	Miroslav Blatak (D)	Czech Republic	Detroit Red Wings	HC Zlín (Czech Republic)
130	Colt King (LW)	Canada	Colorado Avalanche	Guelph Storm (OHL)
131	Ben Eaves (C)	United States	Pittsburgh Penguins (compensatory)^{20}	Boston College (NCAA)

1. Philadelphia's acquired fourth-round pick went to Nashville as the result of a trade on June 23, 2001, that sent fourth, fifth and seventh-round picks in the 2001 Entry Draft to Philadelphia in exchange for this pick.
  Philadelphia previously acquired this pick as the result of a trade on June 25, 2000, that sent John Vanbiesbrouck to the Islanders in exchange for this pick.
2. Tampa Bay's fourth-round pick went to Ottawa as the result of a trade on June 23, 2001, that sent a third-round pick in the 2001 Entry Draft to Tampa Bay in exchange for a seventh-round pick in the 2001 Entry Draft and this pick.
3. Florida's fourth-round pick went to the Islanders as the result of a trade on June 23, 2001, that sent a third-round pick in the 2001 Entry Draft to Florida in exchange for a third-round pick in the 2002 entry draft and this pick.
4. Montreal's fourth-round pick went to Chicago as the result of a trade on June 23, 2001, that sent Stephane Quintal to Montreal in exchange for this pick.
5. Columbus' fourth-round pick went to Anaheim as the result of a trade on May 25, 2000, that sent Espen Knutsen to Columbus in exchange for this pick.
6. Chicago's fourth-round pick went to San Jose as the result of a trade on June 24, 2001, that sent a fourth-round pick (# 119 overall), a sixth-round pick and a seventh-round pick in the 2001 Entry Draft to Chicago in exchange for this pick.
7. The Rangers' fourth-round pick went to San Jose as the result of a trade on December 30, 1999, that sent Radek Dvorak to the Rangers in exchange for Todd Harvey and this pick.
8. Montreal acquired this pick as the result of a compensation for Toronto signing Shayne Corson as a free agent on July 4, 2000.
9. Philadelphia's acquired fourth-round pick went to Carolina as the result of a trade on June 24, 2001, that sent a third-round pick in the 2002 entry draft to Philadelphia in exchange for this pick.
  Philadelphia previously acquired this pick as the result of a trade on June 23, 2001, that sent a fourth-round pick (# 98 overall) in the 2001 Entry Draft to Nashville in exchange for a fifth-round pick and seventh-round pick in the 2001 Entry Draft along with this pick.
10. New Jersey's acquired fourth-round pick went to Atlanta as the result of a trade on June 24, 2001, that sent a third-round pick in the 2002 entry draft to New Jersey in exchange for a seventh-round pick in the 2002 entry draft and this pick.
  New Jersey previously acquired this pick as the result of a trade on June 23, 2001, that sent a third-round pick in the 2001 Entry Draft to Phoenix in exchange for a third-round pick in the 2002 entry draft and this pick.
11. Carolina's fourth-round pick went to the Rangers as the result of a trade on August 4, 2000, that sent Rob DiMaio and Darren Langdon to Carolina in exchange for Sandy McCarthy and this pick.
12. Toronto's fourth-round pick went to Chicago as the result of a trade on October 2, 2000, that sent Bryan McCabe to Toronto in exchange for Alexander Karpovtsev and this pick.
13. Columbus' acquired fourth-round pick went to Florida as the result of a trade on March 13, 2001, that sent Ray Whitney and future considerations to Columbus in exchange for Kevyn Adams and a conditional pick in 2001 Entry Draft or 2002 entry draft. Conditions of the pick are unknown and it became this pick.
  Columbus acquired this pick as the result of a compensation for Los Angeles signing Mathieu Schneider as a free agent on August 14, 2000.
14. Washington's acquired fourth-round pick went to Anaheim as the result of a trade on March 13, 2001, that sent Jason Marshall to Washington in exchange for Alexei Tezikov and this pick.
  Washington previously acquired this pick as the result of a trade on February 4, 2000, that sent Alexandre Volchkov to Edmonton in exchange for this pick.
15. San Jose's fourth-round pick went to Chicago as the result of a trade on June 24, 2001, that sent a fourth-round pick (# 106 overall) in the 2001 Entry Draft to San Jose in exchange for a sixth-round pick and a seventh-round pick in the 2001 Entry Draft along with this pick.
16. Detroit acquired this pick as the result of a compensation for Florida signing Igor Larionov as a Group III free agent on July 1, 2000.
17. Atlanta's acquired fourth-round pick went to St. Louis as the result of a trade on June 23, 2001, that sent Lubos Bartecko to Atlanta in exchange for this pick.
  Atlanta previously acquired this pick as the result of a trade on March 13, 2000, that sent Donald Audette to Buffalo in exchange for Kamil Piros and this pick.
18. Philadelphia's' fourth-round pick went to Tampa Bay as the result of a trade on June 24, 2001, that sent a third-round pick in the 2002 entry draft to Philadelphia in exchange for a fifth-round pick and a seventh-round pick in the 2001 Entry Draft along with this pick.
19. St. Louis' fourth-round pick went to Calgary as the result of a trade on June 23, 2001, that sent Fred Brathwaite, Daniel Tkaczuk, Sergei Varlamov and a ninth-round pick in the 2001 Entry Draft to St. Louis in exchange for Roman Turek and this pick.
20. Pittsburgh acquired this pick as the result of a compensation for Boston signing Peter Popovic as a free agent on July 2, 2000.

=== Round five ===
Pick	Player	Nationality	NHL team	College/junior/club team
132	Dusan Salficky (G)	Czech Republic	New York Islanders	HC Plzeň (Czech Republic)
133	Jussi Markkanen (G)	Finland	Edmonton Oilers (compensatory)^{1}	Tappara (Finland)
134	Kyle Wellwood (C)	Canada	Toronto Maple Leafs (from Tampa Bay)^{2}	Belleville Bulls (OHL)
135	Colin Stuart (C)	United States	Atlanta Thrashers	Colorado College (NCAA)
136	Billy Thompson (G)	Canada	Florida Panthers	Prince George Cougars (WHL)
137	Joel Perrault (C)	Canada	Mighty Ducks of Anaheim	Baie-Comeau Drakkar (QMJHL)
138	Paul Lynch (D)	United States	Tampa Bay Lightning (from Philadelphia; compensatory)^{3}	Valley Jr. Warriors (EJHL)
139	Shawn Collymore (RW)	Canada	New York Rangers (from Minnesota)^{4}	Quebec Remparts (QMJHL)
140	Tomas Plihal (LW)	Czech Republic	San Jose Sharks (from Montreal via Buffalo)^{5}	Bili Tygri Liberec (Czech Republic)
141	Cole Jarrett (D)	Canada	Columbus Blue Jackets	Plymouth Whalers (OHL)
142	Tommi Jaminki (LW)	Finland	Chicago Blackhawks	Blues (Finland)
143	Frantisek Skladany (LW)	Slovakia	Colorado Avalanche (from NY Rangers)^{6}	Boston University (NCAA)
144	Cody McCormick (C/RW)	Canada	Colorado Avalanche (compensatory)^{7}	Belleville Bulls (OHL)
145	James Hakewill (D)	United States	Calgary Flames	Westminster High School (USHS-CT)
146	Jussi Timonen (D)	Finland	Philadelphia Flyers (from Nashville)^{8}	KalPa (Finland)
147	Jiri Jakes (RW)	Czech Republic	Boston Bruins	Brandon Wheat Kings (WHL)
148	David Klema (D)	United States	Phoenix Coyotes	Des Moines Buccaneers (USHL)
149	Mikko Viitanen (D)	Finland	Colorado Avalanche (from Carolina)^{9}	Ahmat (Finland)
150	Bernd Bruckler (G)	Austria	Philadelphia Flyers (compensatory)^{10}	Tri-City Storm (USHL)
151	Kevin Bieksa (D)	Canada	Vancouver Canucks	Bowling Green University (CCHA)
152	Terry Denike (G)	Canada	Los Angeles Kings (from Toronto via Tampa Bay)^{11}	Weyburn Red Wings (SJHL)
153	Tuukka Mantyla (D)	Finland	Los Angeles Kings	Tappara (Finland)
154	Jake Brenk (C)	United States	Edmonton Oilers	Breck School (USHS–MN)
155	Michal Vondrka (C)	Czech Republic	Buffalo Sabres (from San Jose)^{12}	HC České Budějovice (Czech Republic)
156	Andy Schneider (D)	United States	Pittsburgh Penguins	Lincoln Stars (USHL)
157	Andreas Jamtin (RW)	Sweden	Detroit Red Wings (from Buffalo via Columbus and Calgary)^{13}	Färjestad BK (Sweden)
158	Roman Malek (G)	Czech Republic	Philadelphia Flyers	Slavia Prague (Czech Republic)
159	Dmitri Semin (C)	Russia	St. Louis Blues	Spartak Moscow (Russia)
160	Artyom Ternavsky (D)	Russia	Washington Capitals	Sherbrooke Beavers (QMJHL)
161	Mike Smith (G)	Canada	Dallas Stars	Sudbury Wolves (OHL)
162	Stefan Schauer (D)	Germany	Ottawa Senators	SC Riessersee (Germany)
163	Andreas Salomonsson (LW)	Sweden	New Jersey Devils	Djurgardens IF (Sweden)
164	Yuri Trubachev (C)	Russia	Calgary Flames (from Detroit)^{14}	SKA Saint Petersburg (Russia)
165	Pierre-Luc Emond (C)	Canada	Colorado Avalanche	Drummondville Voltigeurs (QMJHL)

1. Edmonton previously acquired this pick as compensation after Anaheim signed free agent German Titov on July 1, 2000.
2. Tampa Bay's fifth-round pick went to Toronto as the result of a trade on February 9, 2000, that sent Mike Johnson, Marek Posmyk, a fifth-round and sixth-round picks in the 2000 entry draft to Tampa Bay in exchange for Darcy Tucker and a fourth-round pick in the 2000 entry draft. Toronto had an option to swap fifth-round picks in the 2001 Entry Draft with Tampa Bay (this pick).
3. Philadelphia's' acquired fifth-round pick went to Tampa Bay as the result of a trade on June 24, 2001, that sent a third-round pick in the 2002 entry draft to Philadelphia in exchange for a fourth-round pick and a seventh-round pick in the 2001 Entry Draft along with this pick.
  Philadelphia previously acquired this pick as compensation after Atlanta signed free agent Adam Burt on July 14, 2000.
4. Minnesota's fifth-round pick went to the Rangers as the result of a trade on June 23, 2001, that sent a third-round pick in the 2001 Entry Draft (# 74 overall) to Minnesota in exchange for a third-round pick (# 79 overall) in the 2001 Entry Draft and this pick.
5. Buffalo's acquired fifth-round pick went to San Jose as the result of a trade on June 24, 2001, that sent fifth (# 155 overall), eighth and a nine-round picks in the 2001 Entry Draft to Buffalo in exchange for this pick.
  Buffalo previously acquired this pick as the result of a trade on June 25, 2000, that sent a sixth-round pick in the 2000 entry draft to Montreal in exchange for this pick.
6. The Rangers' fifth-round pick went to Colorado as the result of a trade on December 28, 2000, that sent Alexei Gusarov to the Rangers in exchange for this pick.
7. Colorado previously acquired this pick as compensation after Buffalo signed free agent Dave Andreychuk on July 13, 2000.
8. Nashville's fifth-round pick went to Philadelphia as the result of a trade on June 23, 2001, that sent a fourth-round pick (# 98 overall) in the 2001 Entry Draft to Nashville in exchange for a fourth-round pick (# 110 overall) and seventh-round pick in the 2001 Entry Draft along with this pick.
9. Carolina's fifth-round pick went to Colorado as the result of a trade on June 24, 2001, that sent Chris Dingman to Carolina in exchange for this pick.
10. Philadelphia previously acquired this pick as compensation after Chicago signed free agent Valeri Zelepukin on July 18, 2000.
11. Tampa Bay's acquired fifth-round pick went to Los Angeles as the result of a trade on June 24, 2001, that sent two sixth-round picks (# 184 & 188 overall) in the 2001 Entry Draft to Tampa Bay in exchange for this pick.
  Toronto's fifth-round pick went to Tampa Bay as the result of a trade on February 9, 2000, that sent Darcy Tucker and a fourth-round in the 2000 entry draft to Toronto in exchange for Mike Johnson, Marek Posmyk, a fifth-round and sixth-round picks in the 2000 entry draft. Also, Toronto had an option to swap fifth-round picks in the 2001 Entry Draft with Tampa Bay (this pick).
12. San Jose's fifth-round pick went to Buffalo as the result of a trade on June 24, 2001, that sent a fifth-round pick (# 140 overall) in the 2001 Entry Draft to San Jose in exchange for an eighth-round pick and a nine-round pick in the 2001 Entry Draft along with this pick.
13. Calgary's acquired fifth-round pick went to Detroit as the result of a trade on June 24, 2001, that sent a fifth-round pick (# 164 overall) and a seventh-round pick in the 2001 Entry Draft to Calgary in exchange for this pick.
  Calgary previously acquired this pick as the result of a trade on June 24, 2001, that sent the rights to Paul Manning to Columbus in exchange for this pick.
  Columbus previously acquired pick as the result of a trade on June 23, 2000, that sent future considerations (Columbus agreed to select Geoff Sanderson and Dwayne Roloson in the 2000 NHL expansion draft) to Buffalo in exchange for Matt Davidson, Jean-Luc Grand-Pierre. a fifth-round pick in the 2000 entry draft and this pick.
14. Detroit's fifth-round pick went to Calgary as the result of a trade on June 24, 2001, that sent a fifth-round pick (# 157 overall) in the 2001 Entry Draft to Detroit in exchange for a seventh-round pick in the 2001 Entry Draft and this pick.

=== Round six ===
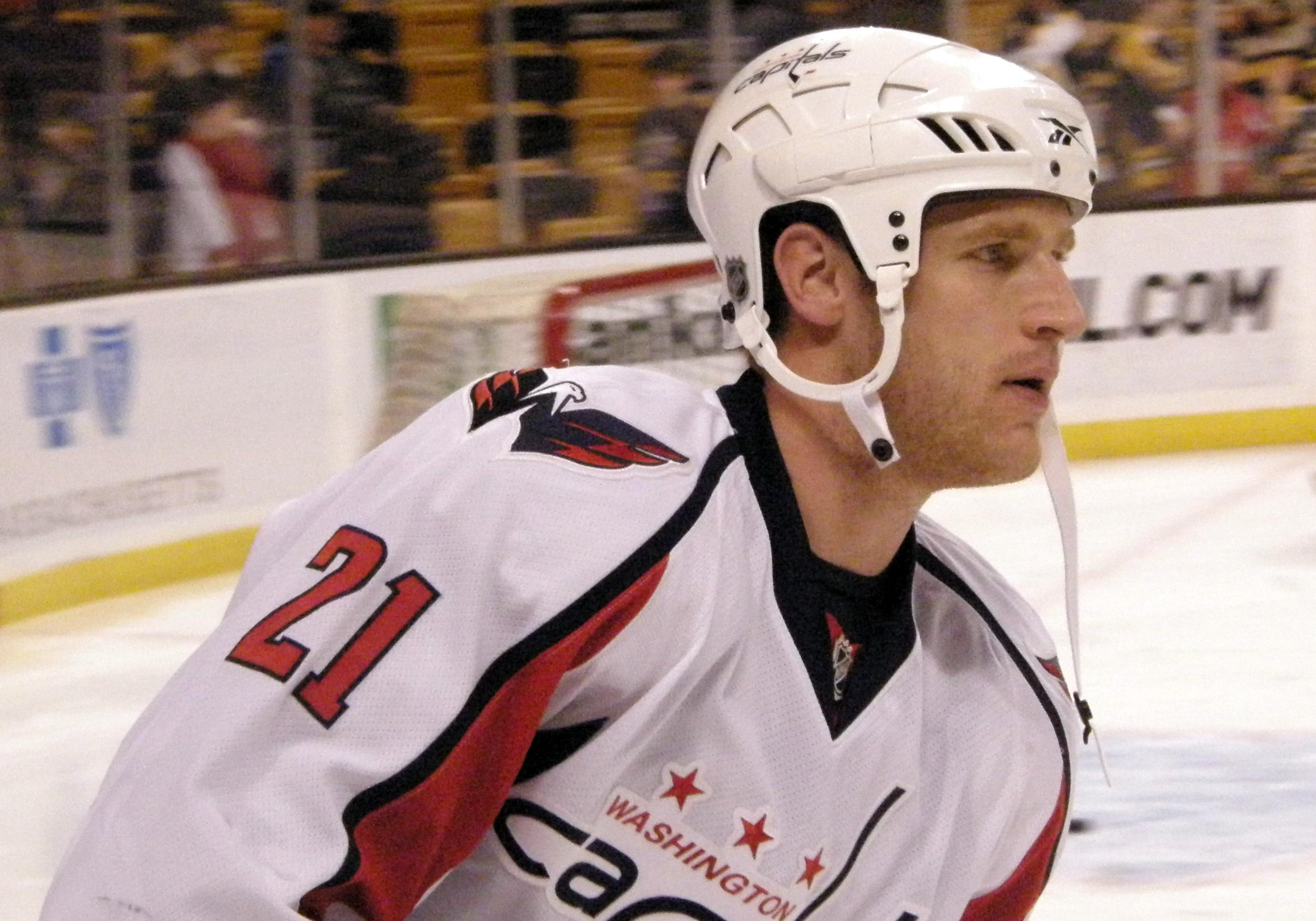
Longtime Capital Brooks Laich was selected by the Ottawa Senators with the 193rd pick.

Pick	Player	Nationality	NHL team	College/junior/club team
166	Andy Chiodo (G)	Canada	New York Islanders	Toronto St. Michael's Majors (OHL)
167	Michal Blazek (D)	Czech Republic	Dallas Stars (from Tampa Bay)^{1}	Vsetín HC (Czech Republic)
168	Maxim Kondratyev (D)	Russia	Toronto Maple Leafs (from Atlanta)^{2}	Lada Togliatti (Russia)
169	Dustin Johner (C)	Canada	Florida Panthers	Seattle Thunderbirds (WHL)
170	Jan Tabacek (D)	Slovakia	Mighty Ducks of Anaheim	Martimex ZTS Martin HC (Slovakia)
171	Eric Himelfarb (C)	Canada	Montreal Canadiens (from Minnesota)^{3}	Sarnia Sting (OHL)
172	Dennis Seidenberg (D)	Germany	Philadelphia Flyers (from Montreal)^{4}	Adler Mannheim (Germany)
173	Justin Aikins (RW)	Canada	Columbus Blue Jackets	Langley Hornets (BCHL)
174	Alexander Golovin (LW)	Russia	Chicago Blackhawks	Avangard Omsk-2 (Russia)
175	Ryane Clowe (RW)	Canada	San Jose Sharks (compensatory)^{5}	Rimouski Océanic (QMJHL)
176	Marek Zidlicky (D)	Czech Republic	New York Rangers	HIFK (Finland)
177	Andrei Razin (C)	Russia	Philadelphia Flyers (from Calgary)^{6}	Metallurg Magnitogorsk (Russia)
178	Anton Lavrentiev (C)	Russia	Nashville Predators	Ak Bars Kazan (Russia)
179	Andrew Alberts (D)	United States	Boston Bruins	Waterloo Blackhawks (USHL)
180	Scott Polaski (RW)	United States	Phoenix Coyotes	Sioux City Musketeers (USHL)
181	Daniel Boisclair (G)	Canada	Carolina Hurricanes	Cape Breton Screaming Eagles (QMJHL)
182	Tom Cavanagh (C)	United States	San Jose Sharks (from Vancouver)^{7}	Phillips Exeter Academy (USHS–NH)
183	Jaroslav Sklenar (LW)	Czech Republic	Toronto Maple Leafs	HC Brno (Czech Republic)
184	Scott Horvath (RW)	United States	Colorado Avalanche (from Los Angeles via Tampa Bay)^{8}	University of Massachusetts Amherst (Hockey East)
185	Mikael Svensk (D)	Sweden	Edmonton Oilers	Frölunda HC (Sweden)
186	Petr Puncochar (D)	Czech Republic	Chicago Blackhawks (from San Jose)^{9}	HC Energie Karlovy Vary (Czech Republic)
187	Artyom Vostrikov (LW)	Russia	Columbus Blue Jackets (from Pittsburgh)^{10}	Lada Togliatti-2 (Russia)
188	Art Femenella (D)	United States	Tampa Bay Lightning (from Buffalo via Los Angeles)^{11}	Sioux City Musketeers (USHL)
189	Pasi Nurminen (G)	Finland	Atlanta Thrashers (from Philadelphia)^{12}	Jokerit (Finland)
190	Brett Scheffelmaier (D)	Canada	St. Louis Blues	Medicine Hat Tigers (WHL)
191	Zbynek Novak (C)	Czech Republic	Washington Capitals	Slavia Prague (Czech Republic)
192	Jussi Jokinen (LW)	Finland	Dallas Stars	Karpat Jr. (Finland)
193	Brooks Laich (C)	Canada	Ottawa Senators	Moose Jaw Warriors (WHL)
194	James Massen (RW)	United States	New Jersey Devils	Sioux Falls Stampede (USHL)
195	Nick Pannoni (G)	Canada	Detroit Red Wings	Seattle Thunderbirds (WHL)
196	Charlie Stephens (C)	Canada	Colorado Avalanche	Guelph Storm (OHL)

1. Tampa Bay's sixth-round pick went to Dallas as the result of a trade on March 21, 1999, that sent Sergey Gusev to Tampa Bay in exchange for Benoit Hogue and a conditional sixth-round pick (this pick). Conditions of this draft pick are unknown.
2. Atlanta's sixth-round pick went to Toronto as the result of a trade on July 15, 1999, that sent Martin Procházka to Atlanta in exchange for this pick.
3. Montreal acquired this pick as compensation on June 12, 2001, after Minnesota hired Jacques Lemaire as head coach.
4. Montreal's sixth-round pick went to Philadelphia as the result of a trade on December 7, 2000, that sent Gino Odjick to Montreal in exchange for P.J. Stock and this pick.
5. San Jose previously acquired this pick as compensation after Pittsburgh signed free agent Jeff Norton on November 14, 2000.
6. Calgary's sixth-round pick went to Philadelphia as the result of a trade on March 6, 2000, that sent Marc Bureau to Calgary in exchange for Travis Brigley and this pick.
7. Vancouver's sixth-round pick went to San Jose as the result of a trade on June 26, 1999, that sent a sixth-round pick in the 1999 entry draft to Vancouver in exchange for this pick.
8. Tampa Bay's acquired sixth-round pick went to Colorado as the result of a trade on June 24, 2001, that sent Nolan Pratt to Tampa Bay in exchange for this pick.
  Tampa Bay previously acquired this pick as the result of a trade on June 24, 2001, that sent a fifth-round pick in the 2001 Entry Draft to Los Angeles in exchange for two sixth-round picks (# 188 overall and this pick) in the 2001 Entry Draft.
9. San Jose's sixth-round pick went to Chicago as the result of a trade on June 24, 2001, that sent a fourth-round pick (# 106 overall) in the 2001 Entry Draft to San Jose in exchange for a fourth-round pick (# 119 overall) and a seventh-round pick in the 2001 Entry Draft along with this pick.
10. Pittsburgh's sixth-round pick went to Columbus as the result of a trade on March 13, 2001, that sent Frantisek Kucera to Pittsburgh in exchange for this pick.
11. Los Angeles' acquired sixth-round pick went to Tampa Bay as the result of a trade on June 24, 2001, that sent a fifth-round pick in the 2001 Entry Draft to Los Angeles in exchange for two sixth-round picks (# 184 overall and this pick) in the 2001 Entry Draft.
  Los Angeles previously acquired this pick as the result of a trade on January 22, 2000, that sent Vladimir Tsyplakov and a conditional eighth-round pick in the 2001 Entry Draft to Buffalo in exchange for an eighth-round pick in the 2000 entry draft a conditional sixth-round (this pick) or a conditional pick in the 2001 Entry Draft and this pick. Condition of these draft picks was if Vladimir Tsyplakov re-signed with Buffalo after the 2000 entry draft, Los Angeles and Buffalo receives the extra picks. If he did not re-sign, Los Angeles would get a conditional compensatory pick if one is awarded to Buffalo.
12. Philadelphia's sixth-round pick went to Atlanta as the result of a trade on March 14, 2000, that sent Kirby Law to Philadelphia in exchange for a sixth-round pick in the 2000 entry draft and this pick.

=== Round seven ===
Pick	Player	Nationality	NHL team	College/junior/club team
197	Jan Holub (D)	Czech Republic	New York Islanders	Bili Tygri Liberec (Czech Republic)
198	Ivan Kolozvary (C)	Slovakia	Toronto Maple Leafs (from Tampa Bay)^{1}	Dukla Trenčín (Slovakia)
199	Matt Suderman (D)	Canada	Atlanta Thrashers	Saskatoon Blades (WHL)
200	Toni Koivisto (LW)	Finland	Florida Panthers	Lukko (Finland)
201	Colin FitzRandolph (RW)	United States	Atlanta Thrashers (from Anaheim)^{2}	Phillips Exeter Academy (NH)
202	Derek Boogaard (LW)	Canada	Minnesota Wild	Prince George Cougars (WHL)
203	Andrew Archer (D)	Canada	Montreal Canadiens	Guelph Storm (OHL)
204	Raffaele Sannitz (C)	Switzerland	Columbus Blue Jackets	HC Lugano (Switzerland)
205	Teemu Jaaskelainen (D)	Finland	Chicago Blackhawks	Ilves Jr. (Finland)
206	Petr Preucil (LW)	Czech Republic	New York Rangers	Quebec Remparts (QMJHL)
207	Garett Bembridge (RW)	Canada	Calgary Flames	Saskatoon Blades (WHL)
208	Thierry Douville (D)	Canada	Philadelphia Flyers (from Nashville)^{3}	Baie-Comeau Drakkar (QMJHL)
209	Jordan Sigalet (G)	Canada	Boston Bruins	Victoria Grizzlies (BCJHL)
210	Steve Belanger (G)	United States	Phoenix Coyotes	Kamloops Blazers (WHL)
211	Sean Curry (D)	United States	Carolina Hurricanes	Tri-City Americans (WHL)
212	Jason King (RW)	Canada	Vancouver Canucks	Halifax Mooseheads (QMJHL)
213	Jan Chovan (G)	Slovakia	Toronto Maple Leafs	Belleville Bulls (OHL)
214	Cristobal Huet (G)	France	Los Angeles Kings	HC Lugano (Switzerland)
215	Dan Baum (LW)	Canada	Edmonton Oilers	Prince George Cougars (WHL)
216	Oleg Minakov (C)	Russia	Chicago Blackhawks (from San Jose)^{4}	Kristall Elektrostal (Russia)
217	Tomas Duba (G)	Czech Republic	Pittsburgh Penguins	Sparta Prague (Czech Republic)
218	Jan Platil (D)	Czech Republic	Ottawa Senators (from Buffalo via Tampa Bay)^{5}	Barrie Colts (OHL)
219	Dennis Packard (LW)	United States	Tampa Bay Lightning (from Philadelphia)^{6}	Harvard University (NCAA)
220	David Moss (RW)	United States	Calgary Flames (from St. Louis)^{7}	Cedar Rapids RoughRiders (USHL)
221	Johnny Oduya (D)	Sweden	Washington Capitals	Victoriaville Tigres (QMJHL)
222	Jeremy Van Hoof (D)	Canada	Tampa Bay Lightning (from Dallas)^{8}	Ottawa 67's (OHL)
223	Brandon Bochenski (RW)	United States	Ottawa Senators	Lincoln Stars (USHL)
224	Tony Martensson (C)	Sweden	Mighty Ducks of Anaheim (from New Jersey)^{9}	Brynäs IF (Sweden)
225	David Printz (D)	Sweden	Philadelphia Flyers (from Ottawa; compensatory)^{10}	Great Falls (AWHL)
226	Pontus Petterstrom (LW)	Sweden	New York Rangers (from Detroit via Calgary)^{11}	Tingsryds AIF (Sweden)
227	Marek Svatos (RW)	Slovakia	Colorado Avalanche	Kootenay Ice (WHL)

1. Tampa Bay's seventh-round pick went to Toronto as the result of a trade on October 1, 1999, that sent Fredrik Modin to Tampa Bay in exchange for Cory Cross and this pick.
2. Anaheim's seventh-round pick went to Atlanta as the result of a trade on March 14, 2000, that sent Ed Ward to Anaheim in exchange for this pick.
3. Nashville's seventh-round pick went to Philadelphia as the result of a trade on June 23, 2001, that sent a fourth-round pick (# 98 overall) in the 2001 Entry Draft to Nashville in exchange for a fourth-round pick (# 110 overall) and fifth-round pick in the 2001 Entry Draft along with this pick.
4. San Jose's seventh-round pick went to Chicago as the result of a trade on June 24, 2001, that sent a fourth-round pick (# 106 overall) in the 2001 Entry Draft to San Jose in exchange for a fourth-round pick (# 119 overall) and a sixth-round pick in the 2001 Entry Draft along with this pick.
5. Tampa Bay's acquired seventh-round pick went to Ottawa as the result of a trade on June 23, 2001, that sent a third-round pick in the 2001 Entry Draft to Tampa Bay in exchange for a fourth-round pick in the 2001 Entry Draft and this pick.
  Tampa Bay previously acquired this pick as the result of a trade on June 25, 2000, that sent a seventh-round pick in the 2000 entry draft to Buffalo in exchange for a ninth-round pick in the 2001 Entry Draft and this pick.
6. Philadelphia's' seventh-round pick went to Tampa Bay as the result of a trade on June 24, 2001, that sent a third-round pick in the 2002 entry draft to Philadelphia in exchange for a fourth-round pick and a fifth-round pick in the 2001 Entry Draft along with this pick.
7. St. Louis' seventh-round pick went to Calgary as the result of a trade on March 13, 2001, that sent Cory Stillman to St. Louis in exchange for Craig Conroy and this pick.
8. Dallas' seventh-round pick went to Tampa Bay as the result of a trade on March 13, 2001, that sent Grant Ledyard to Dallas in exchange for this pick.
9. New Jersey's seventh-round pick went to Anaheim as the result of a trade on June 12, 2000, that sent Ed Ward to New Jersey in exchange for this pick.
10. Ottawa's acquired seventh-round pick went to Philadelphia as the result of a trade on June 23, 2001, that sent a first-round pick (# 23 overall) in the 2001 Entry Draft to Ottawa in exchange for a first-round pick (# 27 overall) in the 2001 Entry Draft, a second-round pick the 2002 entry draft and this pick.
  Ottawa acquired this pick as compensation after Dallas signed free agent Shaun Van Allen on July 23, 2000.
11. Calgary's acquired seventh-round pick went to the Rangers as the result of a trade on June 24, 2001, that sent a seventh-round pick (# 207 overall) in the 2001 Entry Draft to Calgary in exchange for this pick.
  Calgary previously acquired this pick as the result of a trade on June 24, 2001, that sent a fifth-round pick (# 157 overall) in the 2001 Entry Draft to Detroit in exchange for a fifth-round pick (# 164 overall) in the 2001 Entry Draft and this pick.

=== Round eight ===
Pick	Player	Nationality	NHL team	College/junior/club team
228	Mike Bray (RW)	Canada	New York Islanders	Quebec Remparts (QMJHL)
229	Aaron Voros (RW)	Canada	New Jersey Devils (from Tampa Bay)^{1}	Victoria Salsa (BCHL)
230	Leonid Zhvachkin (D)	Russia	New York Rangers (from Atlanta)^{2}	Podolsk (Russia)
231	Kyle Bruce (RW)	Canada	Florida Panthers	Prince Albert Raiders (WHL)
232	Martin Gerber (G)	Switzerland	Mighty Ducks of Anaheim	Langnau-Sui (Switzerland)
233	Joe Campbell (D)	United States	Calgary Flames (from Minnesota via San Jose)^{3}	Des Moines Buccaneers (USHL)
234	Carl Aslund (D)	Sweden	Buffalo Sabres (from San Jose; compensatory)^{4}	Huddinge IK (Sweden)
235	Neil Petruic (D)	Canada	Ottawa Senators (from Montreal)^{5}	Kindersley Klippers (SJHL)
236	Ryan Bowness (RW)	Canada	Columbus Blue Jackets	Brampton Battalion (OHL)
237	Mike Gabinet (D)	Canada	Los Angeles Kings (from Chicago)^{6}	University of Nebraska Omaha (NCAA)
238	Ryan Hollweg (C)	United States	New York Rangers	Medicine Hat Tigers (WHL)
239	Jake Riddle (LW)	United States	Minnesota Wild (from Calgary)^{7}	Seattle Thunderbirds (WHL)
240	Gustav Grasberg (LW)	Sweden	Nashville Predators	Mora IK (Sweden)
241	Milan Jurcina (D)	Slovakia	Boston Bruins	Halifax Mooseheads (QMJHL)
242	Andrew Murray (C)	Canada	Columbus Blue Jackets (compensatory)^{8}	Bemidji State University (WCHA)
243	Frantisek Lukes (LW)	Czech Republic	Phoenix Coyotes	Toronto St. Michael's Majors (OHL)
244	Carter Trevisani (D)	Canada	Carolina Hurricanes	Ottawa 67's (OHL)
245	Konstantin Mikhailov (C)	Russia	Vancouver Canucks	Nizhnekamsk Neftekhimik (Russia)
246	Tomas Mojzis (D)	Czech Republic	Toronto Maple Leafs	Moose Jaw Warriors (WHL)
247	Marek Dubec (C)	Slovakia	Buffalo Sabres (from Los Angeles)^{9}	Vsetín HC (Czech Republic)
248	Kari Haakana (D)	Finland	Edmonton Oilers	Jokerit (Finland)
249	Matthew Maglione (D)	United States	Washington Capitals (from San Jose)^{10}	Princeton University (NCAA)
250	Brandon Crawford-West (G)	United States	Pittsburgh Penguins	Texas Tornado (NAHL)
251	Ville Hamalainen (RW)	Finland	Calgary Flames (from Buffalo)^{11}	SaiPa (Finland)
252	Jean-Francois Soucy (LW)	Canada	Tampa Bay Lightning (from Philadelphia)^{12}	Montreal Rocket (QMJHL)
253	Petr Cajanek (LW)	Czech Republic	St. Louis Blues	RI OKNA Zlín (Czech Republic)
254	Peter Polcik (LW)	Slovakia	Washington Capitals	HK Ardo Nitra (Slovakia)
255	Marco Rosa (C)	Canada	Dallas Stars	Merrimack College (NCAA)
256	Gregg Johnson (C)	United States	Ottawa Senators	Boston University (NCAA)
257	Yevgeni Gamalei (D)	Russia	New Jersey Devils	Voskresensk Khimik (Russia)
258	Dmitri Bykov (D)	Russia	Detroit Red Wings	Ak Bars Kazan (Russia)
259	Dmitri Bezrukov (D)	Russia	Tampa Bay Lightning (from Colorado)^{13}	Neftekhimik Nizhnekamsk (Russia)

1. Tampa Bay's eighth-round pick went to New Jersey as the result of a trade on June 25, 2000, that sent a ninth-round pick in the 2000 entry draft to Tampa Bay in exchange for this pick.
2. Atlanta's eighth-round pick went to the Rangers as the result of a trade on June 24, 2001, that the rights to Jeff Dessner to Atlanta in exchange for this pick.
3. San Jose's acquired eighth-round pick went to Calgary as the result of a trade on March 6, 2001, that sent Bill Lindsay to San Jose in exchange for this pick.
  San Jose previously acquired this pick as the result of a trade on June 11, 2000, that sent Andy Sutton, a seventh-round pick in the 2000 entry draft and a third-round pick in the 2001 Entry Draft to Minnesota in exchange for future considerations (protection of Evgeni Nabokov in 2000 NHL expansion draft) and this pick.
4. San Jose's acquired eight-round pick went to Buffalo as the result of a trade on June 24, 2001, that sent a fifth-round pick (# 140 overall) in the 2001 Entry Draft to San Jose in exchange for a fifth-round pick (# 155 overall) and a nine-round pick in the 2001 Entry Draft along with this pick.
  San Jose previously acquired this pick as compensation after Calgary signed free agent Dave Lowry on July 24, 2000.
5. Montreal's eighth-round pick went to Ottawa as the result of a trade on June 24, 2001, that sent Andreas Dackell to Montreal in exchange for this pick.
6. Chicago's eighth-round pick went to Los Angeles as the result of a trade on February 28, 2001, that sent Steve Passmore to Chicago in exchange for this pick.
7. Calgary's eighth-round pick went to Minnesota as the result of a trade on June 23, 2000, that sent Mike Vernon to Calgary in exchange for the rights to Dan Cavanaugh and Minnesota's option of an eight-round pick in the 2000 entry draft or in the 2001 Entry Draft (this pick).
8. Columbus acquired this pick as compensation after Dallas signed free agent Rick Tabaracci on July 12, 2000.
9. Los Angeles' eighth-round pick went to Buffalo as the result of a trade on January 22, 2000, that sent an eighth-round pick in the 2000 entry draft and a conditional sixth-round or a conditional pick in the 2001 Entry Draft to Los Angeles in exchange for Vladimir Tsyplakov and a conditional eighth-round pick in the 2001 Entry Draft (this pick). Condition of these draft picks was if Vladimir Tsyplakov re-signed with Buffalo after the 2000 entry draft, Los Angeles and Buffalo receives the extra picks. If he did not re-sign, Los Angeles would get a conditional compensatory pick if one is awarded to Buffalo.
10. San Jose's eighth-round pick went to Washington as the result of a trade on June 25, 2000, that sent an eighth-round pick 2000 entry draft to San Jose in exchange for this pick.
11. Buffalo's eighth-round pick went to Calgary as the result of a trade on June 25, 2000, that sent an eighth-round pick in the 2000 entry draft to Buffalo in exchange for this pick.
12. Philadelphia's eighth-round pick went to Tampa Bay as the result of a trade on June 24, 2001, that sent a seventh-round pick in the 2002 entry draft to Philadelphia in exchange for a ninth-round pick in the 2002 entry draft and this pick.
13. Colorado's eighth-round pick went to Tampa Bay as the result of a trade on January 21, 2001, that sent Bryan Muir to Colorado in exchange for this pick.

=== Round nine ===
Pick	Player	Nationality	NHL team	College/junior/club team
260	Brian Perez (LW)	United States	New York Islanders	Des Moines Buccaneers (USHL)
261	Vitali Smolyaninov (D)	Kazakhstan	Tampa Bay Lightning	Neftekhimik Nizhnekamsk (Russia)
262	Mario Cartelli (D)	Czech Republic	Atlanta Thrashers	Oceláři Třinec (Czech Republic)
263	Jan Blanar (D)	Slovakia	Florida Panthers	Dukla Trenčín (Slovakia)
264	P. A. Parenteau (LW)	Canada	Mighty Ducks of Anaheim	Chicoutimi Saguenéens (QMJHL)
265	Dale Sullivan (RW)	Canada	Dallas Stars (from Minnesota)^{1}	Hull Olympiques (QMJHL)
266	Viktor Ujcik (RW)	Czech Republic	Montreal Canadiens	Slavia Prague (Czech Republic)
267	Ivan Majesky (D)	Slovakia	Florida Panthers (from Columbus)^{2}	Ilves (Finland)
268	Jeff Miles (C)	Canada	Chicago Blackhawks	University of Vermont (ECAC)
269	Juris Stals (C)	Latvia	New York Rangers	Lukko (Finland)
270	Grant Jacobsen (C)	Canada	St. Louis Blues (from Calgary)^{3}	Regina Pats (WHL)
271	Mikko Lehtonen (D)	Finland	Nashville Predators	Karpat (Finland)
272	Ales Pisa (D)	Czech Republic	Edmonton Oilers (from Boston)^{4}	HC Pardubice (Czech Republic)
273	Severin Blindenbacher (D)	Switzerland	Phoenix Coyotes	Kloten Flyers (Switzerland)
274	Peter Reynolds (D)	Canada	Carolina Hurricanes	North Bay Centennials (OHL)
275	Robert Muller (G)	Germany	Washington Capitals (from Vancouver via New York Islanders)^{5}	Adler Mannheim (Germany)
276	Mike Knoepfli (LW)	Canada	Toronto Maple Leafs	Georgetown Raiders (OPJA)
277	Sebastien Laplante (G)	Canada	Los Angeles Kings	Rayside-Balfour Sabrecats (NOJHL)
278	Shay Stephenson (LW)	Canada	Edmonton Oilers	Red Deer Rebels (WHL)
279	Ryan Jorde (D)	Canada	Buffalo Sabres (from San Jose)^{6}	Tri-City Americans (WHL)
280	Roman Kukhtinov (D)	Russia	New York Islanders (from Pittsburgh)^{7}	Novokuznetsk (Russia)
281	Ilya Solaryov (LW)	Kazakhstan	Tampa Bay Lightning (from Buffalo)^{8}	Molot-Prikamye Perm (Russia)
282	Marcel Rodman (RW)	Slovenia	Boston Bruins (from Philadelphia)^{9}	Peterborough Petes (OHL)
283	Simon Skoog (D)	Sweden	St. Louis Blues	Morrum Jr. (Sweden)
284	Viktor Hubl (LW)	Czech Republic	Washington Capitals	Slavia Prague (Czech Republic)
285	Marek Tomica (RW)	Czech Republic	Dallas Stars	Slavia Prague (Czech Republic)
286	Toni Dahlman (RW)	Finland	Ottawa Senators	Ilves (Finland)
287	Juha-Pekka Ketola (C)	Finland	New York Islanders (from New Jersey)^{10}	Lukko (Finland)
288	François Senez (D)	Canada	Detroit Red Wings	Rensselaer Polytechnic Institute (ECAC)
289	Henrik Bergfors (D)	Sweden	Tampa Bay Lightning (from Colorado)^{11}	Södertälje SK Jr. (Sweden)

1. Minnesota's third-round pick went to Dallas as a result of a trade on June 25, 2000, that sent Aaron Gavey, Pavel Patera, an eighth-round pick in the 2000 entry draft and a fourth-round pick in the 2002 entry draft to Minnesota in exchange for Brad Lukowich, a third-round pick in the 2001 Entry Draft and this pick.
2. Columbus' ninth-round pick went to Florida as the result of a trade on June 25, 2000, that sent a ninth-round pick in the 2000 entry draft to Columbus in exchange for this pick.
3. Calgary's ninth-round pick went to St. Louis as the result of a trade on June 23, 2001, that sent Roman Turek and a fourth-round pick in the 2001 Entry Draft to Calgary in exchange for Fred Brathwaite, Daniel Tkaczuk, Sergei Varlamov and this pick.
4. Boston's ninth-round pick went to Edmonton as the result of a trade on June 25, 2000, that sent a ninth-round pick in the 2000 entry draft to Boston in exchange for this pick.
5. The Islanders' acquired ninth-round pick went to Washington as the result of a trade on January 11, 2001, that sent Craig Berube to the Islanders in exchange for this pick.
  The Islanders previously acquired this pick as the result of a trade on December 28, 2000, that sent Mike Stapleton to Vancouver in exchange for this pick.
6. San Jose's ninth-round pick went to Buffalo as the result of a trade on June 24, 2001, that sent a fifth-round pick (# 140 overall) in the 2001 Entry Draft to San Jose in exchange for a fifth-round pick (# 155 overall) and an eight-round pick in the 2001 Entry Draft along with this pick.
7. Pittsburgh's ninth-round pick went to the Islanders as the result of a trade on November 14, 2000, that sent Dan Trebil to Pittsburgh in exchange for this pick.
8. Buffalo's ninth-round pick went to Tampa Bay as the result of a trade on June 25, 2000, that sent a seventh-round pick in the 2000 entry draft to Buffalo in exchange for a seventh-round pick in the 2001 Entry Draft and this pick.
9. Philadelphia's ninth-round pick went to Boston as the result of a trade on February 13, 2001, that sent the rights to Matt Zultek to Philadelphia in exchange for this pick.
10. New Jersey's ninth-round pick went to the Islanders as the result of a trade on March 12, 2001, that sent John Vanbiesbrouck to New Jersey in exchange for Chris Terreri and this pick.
11. Colorado's ninth-round pick went to Tampa Bay as the result of a trade on June 24, 2001, that sent a ninth-round pick in the 2002 entry draft to Colorado in exchange for this pick.

== Draftees based on nationality ==
Rank	Country	Picks	Percent	Top selection
	North America	148	51.2%	
1	Canada	107	37.0%	Jason Spezza, 2nd
2	United States	41	14.2%	Mike Komisarek, 7th
	Europe	139	48.0%	
3	Russia	38	13.1%	Ilya Kovalchuk, 1st
4	Czech Republic	31	10.7%	Ales Hemsky, 13th
5	Finland	24	8.3%	Mikko Koivu, 6th
6	Sweden	16	5.5%	Fredrik Sjostrom, 11th
7	Slovakia	15	5.2%	Tomas Slovak, 42nd
8	Germany	7	2.4%	Marcel Goc, 20th
9	Switzerland	5	1.7%	Beat Forster, 78th
10	Austria	2	0.7%	Oliver Setzinger, 76th
11	France	1	0.3%	Cristobal Huet, 214th
11	Latvia	1	0.3%	Juris Stals, 269th
11	Slovenia	1	0.3%	Marcel Rodman, 282nd
	Asia	2	0.7%	
10	Kazakhstan	2	0.7%	Vitali Smolyaninov, 261st

== See also ==
- 2001–02 NHL season
- List of NHL first overall draft choices
- List of NHL players
