= Timofei Shishkanov =

Russian professional ice hockey forward (born 1983)

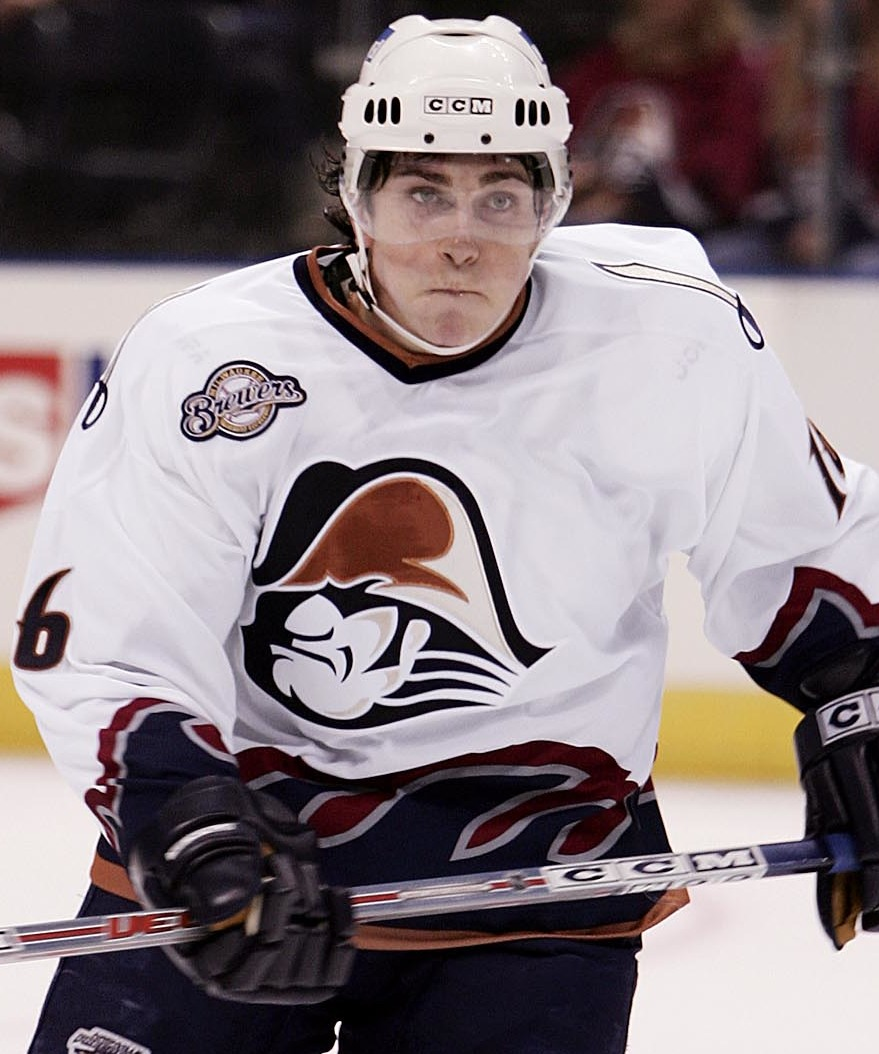
- Shishkanov with the Milwaukee Admirals in 2005
- Born: June 10, 1983 (age 42) Moscow, Soviet Union
- Height: 6 ft 1 in (185 cm)
- Weight: 213 lb (97 kg; 15 st 3 lb)
- Position: Left wing
- Shot: Right
- Played for: Spartak Moscow; CSKA Moscow; Nashville Predators; St. Louis Blues; Vityaz Chekhov; SKA St. Petersburg; Torpedo Nizhny Novgorod; Avangard Omsk; Sibir Novosibirsk; Atlant Moscow Oblast; Amur Khabarovsk; HC Sochi; PSK Sakhalin; Tohoku Free Blades
- NHL draft: 33rd overall, 2001; Nashville Predators
- Playing career: 1999–2019

Timofei Mikhailovich Shishkanov (Russian: Тимофей Михайлович Шишканов; born June 10, 1983) was a Russian ice hockey forward. He played 24 games in the National Hockey League with the Nashville Predators and St. Louis Blues between 2003 and 2006. The rest of his career, which lasted from 1999 to 2019, was mainly spent in the Kontinental Hockey League.

== Playing career ==
Shishkanov played in the 1997 Quebec International Pee-Wee Hockey Tournament with the HC Spartak Moscow youth team.

Shishkanov was drafted by the Nashville Predators as their second-round pick, 33rd overall, in the 2001 NHL entry draft. He played two games for the Predators before being traded to the St. Louis Blues for Mike Sillinger on January 29, 2006.

== Career statistics ==
=== Regular season and playoffs ===
			Regular season					Playoffs
Season	Team	League	GP	G	A	Pts	PIM	GP	G	A	Pts	PIM
1999–00	Spartak Moscow	RUS-2	14	1	0	1	2	—	—	—	—	—
1999–00	Spartak–2 Moscow	RUS-3	14	6	5	11	10	—	—	—	—	—
2000–01	Spartak Moscow	RUS-2	13	0	0	0	2	—	—	—	—	—
2000–01	Spartak–2 Moscow	RUS-3	30	24	36	60	46	—	—	—	—	—
2001–02	CSKA Moscow	RUS-2	22	7	6	13	8	1	0	0	0	0
2001–02	CSKA–2 Moscow	RUS-3	15	8	9	17	14	—	—	—	—	—
2002–03	Québec Remparts	QMJHL	51	36	46	82	60	11	5	12	17	14
2003–04	Milwaukee Admirals	AHL	63	23	20	43	46	22	2	6	8	17
2003–04	Nashville Predators	NHL	2	0	0	0	0	—	—	—	—	—
2004–05	Milwaukee Admirals	AHL	70	20	15	35	31	6	1	0	1	2
2005–06	Milwaukee Admirals	AHL	46	14	15	29	34	—	—	—	—	—
2005–06	St. Louis Blues	NHL	22	3	2	5	6	—	—	—	—	—
2005–06	Peoria Rivermen	AHL	12	3	2	5	8	2	1	0	1	0
2006–07	Vityaz Chekhov	RSL	37	9	5	14	36	3	0	0	0	2
2007–08	CSKA Moscow	RSL	54	12	9	21	57	6	1	2	3	8
2008–09	SKA St. Petersburg	KHL	17	0	1	1	41	—	—	—	—	—
2008–09	Torpedo Nizhny Novgorod	KHL	33	4	5	9	22	3	1	1	2	2
2009–10	Avangard Omsk	KHL	51	12	11	23	26	3	0	0	0	4
2010–11	Avangard Omsk	KHL	23	2	3	5	21	7	0	0	0	4
2011–12	Sibir Novosibirsk	KHL	23	3	4	7	14	—	—	—	—	—
2011–12	Atlant Moscow Oblast	KHL	23	1	2	3	10	8	0	0	0	2
2012–13	THK Tver	VHL	11	1	1	2	2	—	—	—	—	—
2012–13	Amur Khabarovsk	KHL	22	3	5	8	10	—	—	—	—	—
2013–14	Amur Khabarovsk	KHL	49	9	5	14	32	—	—	—	—	—
2014–15	HC Sochi	KHL	30	2	3	5	35	—	—	—	—	—
2015–16	PSK Sakhalin	AL	24	10	11	21	8	8	3	3	6	2
2016–17	PSK Sakhalin	AL	48	25	32	57	26	7	4	3	7	4
2017–18	PSK Sakhalin	AL	24	10	10	20	14	5	3	2	5	0
2018–19	Tohoku Free Blades	AL	32	13	18	31	16	—	—	—	—	—
AHL totals			191	60	52	112	119	30	4	6	10	19
NHL totals			24	3	2	5	6	—	—	—	—	—
KHL totals			271	36	39	75	211	21	1	1	2	12

=== International ===
Year	Team	Event	GP	G	A	Pts	PIM
2000	Russia	U17	6	1	2	3	0
2001	Russia	WJC18	6	2	2	4	0
2003	Russia	WJC	6	1	0	1	2
Junior totals			18	4	4	8	2
