= Viktor Kozlov =

Russian ice hockey player (born 1975)

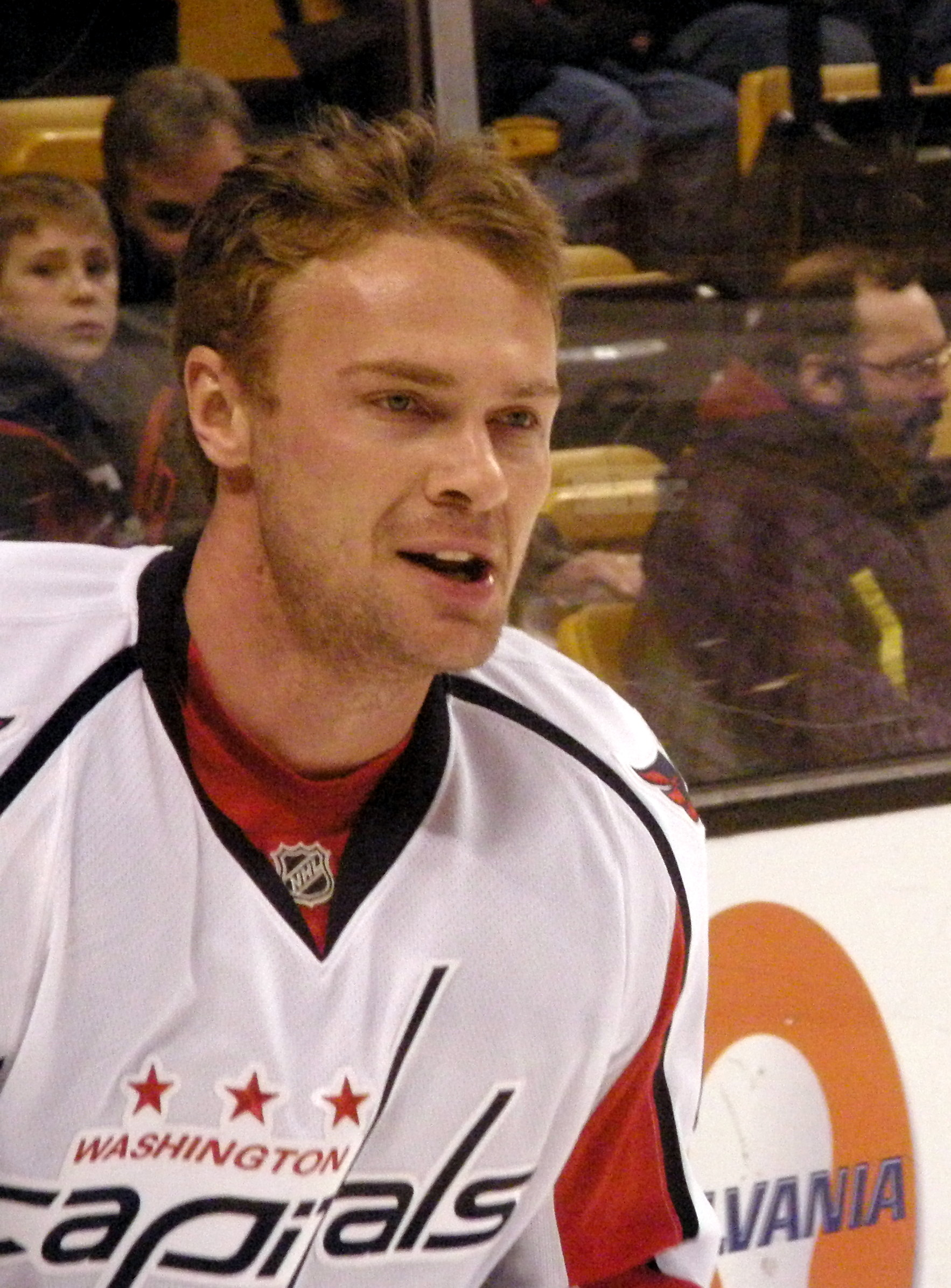
- Kozlov with the Washington Capitals in 2009
- Born: 14 February 1975 (age 51) Tolyatti, Russian SFSR, Soviet Union
- Height: 6 ft 4 in (193 cm)
- Weight: 235 lb (107 kg; 16 st 11 lb)
- Position: Centre
- Shot: Right
- Played for: Lada Togliatti; Dynamo Moscow; San Jose Sharks; Florida Panthers; New Jersey Devils; New York Islanders; Washington Capitals; Salavat Yulaev Ufa; Lokomotiv Yaroslavl; CSKA Moscow; Avtomobilist Yekaterinburg
- National team: Russia
- NHL draft: 6th overall, 1993; San Jose Sharks
- Playing career: 1990–2015

Viktor Nikolayevich Kozlov (Russian: Виктор Николаевич Козлов; born 14 February 1975) is a Russian former professional ice hockey center and coach. He is the current head coach of the Kontinental Hockey League's Salavat Yulaev Ufa.

== Playing career ==
Kozlov was drafted by the San Jose Sharks in the first round as the sixth overall selection in the 1993 NHL entry draft. Kozlov scored his first career goal for the Sharks against Ed Belfour and the Chicago Blackhawks on 21 March 1995 in a 7–3 Sharks loss. He would play a few seasons in San Jose before being traded to the Florida Panthers on 13 November 1997. It would be in Florida, playing with Pavel Bure, that Kozlov would have his best years. His best season was during the 1999–2000 season when he set career highs in assists and points. He played with the Panthers until 1 March 2004, when he was traded to the New Jersey Devils for Christian Berglund and Victor Uchevatov.

During the NHL lockout that wiped out the 2004–05 NHL season, Kozlov played for Lada Togliatti in the Russian Superleague (RSL). However, he returned to the Devils when the NHL started up again.

Kozlov was signed as a free agent by the New York Islanders in 2006. On December 3, 2006, he recorded his second career hat trick and first career four-goal game. Despite a hat trick of his own by Brendan Shanahan, the Islanders defeated rival New York Rangers 7–4 at Madison Square Garden. The four goals gave him a total of six in a 24-hour period — he had scored twice the previous night in Pittsburgh against the Penguins.

On 1 July 2007, Kozlov signed a two-year contract with the Washington Capitals. On 15 April 2009, after 15 NHL seasons Kozlov scored his first playoff goal as a member of the Capitals.

On 9 June 2009, Salavat Yulaev Ufa signed Kozlov to a three-year contract, signifying the end of his successful NHL career. In each season with Salavat, Kozlov helped the club qualify for the post-season and was part of the leadership group, Captaining for one year.

Kozlov opted to sign as a free agent on a two-year contract with Lokomotiv Yaroslavl from the 2012–13 season. In scoring just 1 goal in 21 games, Kozlov was traded to fellow KHL club, HC CSKA Moscow on January 9, 2013. Plagued by injury throughout his tenure with CSKA, Kozlov missed the entire 2013–14 campaign.

On June 19, 2014, Kozlov signalled a return to health in signing a one-year contract to provide a veteran presence with Avtomobilist Yekaterinburg.

In September 2015, Kozlov retired from playing hockey, instead joining Metallurg Magnitogorsk as their assistant coach on October 19, 2015.

== Career statistics ==
=== Regular season and playoffs ===
			Regular season					Playoffs
Season	Team	League	GP	G	A	Pts	PIM	GP	G	A	Pts	PIM
1990–91	Lada Togliatti	URS.2	2	2	0	2	0	—	—	—	—	—
1991–92	Lada Togliatti	CIS	3	0	0	0	0	—	—	—	—	—
1992–93	Dynamo Moscow	RUS	30	6	5	11	4	10	3	0	3	0
1993–94	Dynamo Moscow	RUS	42	16	9	25	14	7	3	2	5	0
1994–95	Dynamo Moscow	RUS	3	1	1	2	2	—	—	—	—	—
1994–95	San Jose Sharks	NHL	16	2	0	2	2	—	—	—	—	—
1994–95	Kansas City Blades	IHL	4	1	1	2	0	13	4	5	9	12
1995–96	Kansas City Blades	IHL	15	4	7	11	12	—	—	—	—	—
1995–96	San Jose Sharks	NHL	62	6	13	19	6	—	—	—	—	—
1996–97	San Jose Sharks	NHL	78	16	25	41	40	—	—	—	—	—
1997–98	San Jose Sharks	NHL	18	5	2	7	2	—	—	—	—	—
1997–98	Florida Panthers	NHL	46	12	11	23	14	—	—	—	—	—
1998–99	Florida Panthers	NHL	65	16	35	51	24	—	—	—	—	—
1999–00	Florida Panthers	NHL	80	17	53	70	16	4	0	1	1	0
2000–01	Florida Panthers	NHL	51	14	23	37	10	—	—	—	—	—
2001–02	Florida Panthers	NHL	50	9	18	27	20	—	—	—	—	—
2002–03	Florida Panthers	NHL	74	22	34	56	18	—	—	—	—	—
2003–04	Florida Panthers	NHL	48	11	16	27	16	—	—	—	—	—
2003–04	New Jersey Devils	NHL	11	2	4	6	2	2	0	0	0	0
2004–05	Lada Togliatti	RSL	52	15	22	37	22	10	3	3	6	6
2005–06	New Jersey Devils	NHL	69	12	13	25	16	3	0	0	0	0
2006–07	New York Islanders	NHL	81	25	26	51	28	5	0	2	2	2
2007–08	Washington Capitals	NHL	81	16	38	54	18	7	0	3	3	2
2008–09	Washington Capitals	NHL	67	13	28	41	16	14	4	2	6	6
2009–10	Salavat Yulayev Ufa	KHL	48	10	18	28	43	16	3	4	7	0
2010–11	Salavat Yulayev Ufa	KHL	48	17	15	32	14	21	4	6	10	2
2011–12	Salavat Yulayev Ufa	KHL	36	10	16	26	8	6	1	0	1	2
2012–13	Lokomotiv Yaroslavl	KHL	21	1	5	6	14	—	—	—	—	—
2012–13	CSKA Moscow	KHL	6	1	0	1	0	4	0	1	1	4
2014–15	Avtomobilist Yekaterinburg	KHL	18	0	3	3	0	—	—	—	—	—
KHL totals			177	39	57	96	79	47	8	11	19	8
NHL totals			897	198	339	537	248	35	4	8	12	10

=== International ===
Medal record

Representing Russia

Ice hockey

World Championship
Bronze medal – third place	2005 Austria	
Silver medal – second place	2010 Germany	

Year	Team	Event	Result	GP	G	A	Pts	PIM
1992	Russia	EJC	3rd place, bronze medalist(s)	6	3	3	6	2
1993	Russia	EJC	2nd place, silver medalist(s)	6	3	3	6	4
1993	Russia	WJC	6th	7	2	1	3	2
1996	Russia	WC	4th	8	0	3	3	0
1998	Russia	WC	5th	6	4	5	9	0
2000	Russia	WC	11th	6	1	3	4	2
2004	Russia	WCH	5th	4	1	0	1	0
2005	Russia	WC	3rd place, bronze medalist(s)	9	1	0	1	0
2006	Russia	OG	4th	8	2	3	5	2
2010	Russia	OG	6th	4	1	0	1	0
2010	Russia	WC	2nd place, silver medalist(s)	9	1	2	3	2
Junior totals				19	8	7	15	8
Senior totals				54	11	16	27	6

Preceded by Andrei Nazarov	San Jose Sharks first-round draft pick 1993	Succeeded by Jeff Friesen
