= Artyom Ternavsky =

Russian ice hockey player

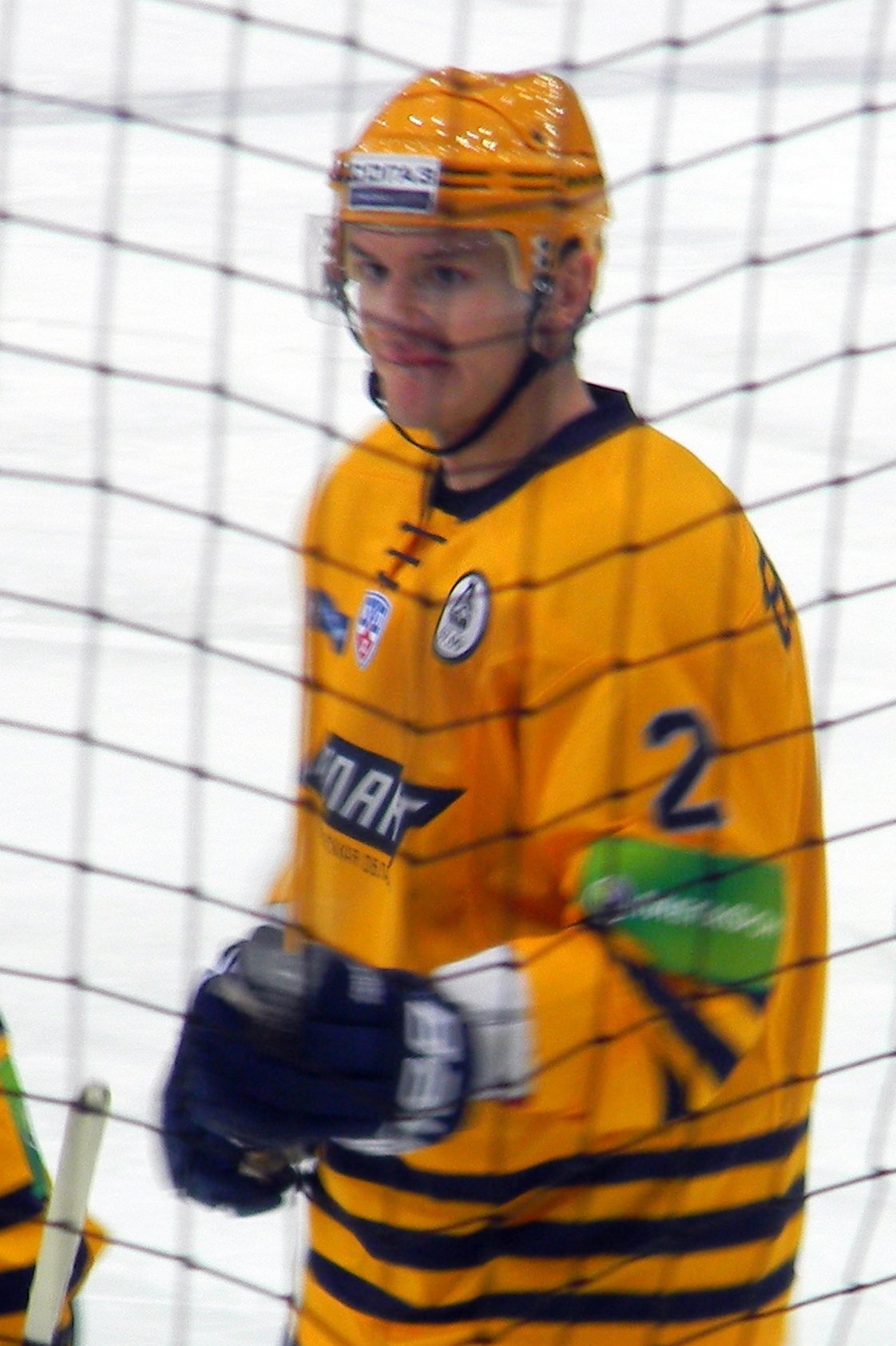
- Born: June 2, 1983 (age 42) Magnitogorsk, USSR
- Height: 1.90 m (6 ft 3 in)
- Weight: 99 kg (218 lb; 15 st 8 lb)
- Position: Defence
- Shot: Right
- KHL team Former teams: Avtomobilist Yekaterinburg; HC CSKA Moscow; HC Vityaz; HC Dinamo Minsk; Metallurg Novokuznetsk; HC Yugra; Atlant Moscow Oblast
- NHL draft: 160th overall, 2001; Washington Capitals
- Playing career: 2002–2016

Artyom Ternavsky (Russian: Артём Тернавский; born June 2, 1983) is a Russian professional ice hockey defenceman who currently plays for Avtomobilist Yekaterinburg of the Kontinental Hockey League (KHL). He was selected by the Washington Capitals in the 5th round (160th overall) of the 2001 NHL entry draft.

== Career statistics ==
=== Regular season and playoffs ===
			Regular season					Playoffs
Season	Team	League	GP	G	A	Pts	PIM	GP	G	A	Pts	PIM
1999–2000	CSKA Moscow	RUS.2	2	0	1	1	0	—	—	—	—	—
1999–2000	CSKA–2 Moscow	RUS.3	25	0	4	4	42	—	—	—	—	—
2000–01	Sherbrooke Castors	QMJHL	65	3	15	18	143	—	—	—	—	—
2001–02	Avangard–VDV Omsk	RUS.3	10	0	3	3	28	—	—	—	—	—
2001–02	Mostovik Kurgan	RUS.2	22	0	0	0	32	—	—	—	—	—
2001–02	Mostovik–2 Kurgan	RUS.4	1	1	0	1	4	—	—	—	—	—
2002–03	Sibir Novosibirsk	RSL	42	1	1	2	20	—	—	—	—	—
2003–04	Metallurg–2 Magnitogorsk	RUS.3	12	1	1	2	12	—	—	—	—	—
2003–04	Salavat Yulaev Ufa	RSL	12	0	0	0	4	—	—	—	—	—
2003–04	Salavat Yulaev–2 Ufa	RUS.3	4	1	4	5	0	—	—	—	—	—
2004–05	Torpedo Nizhny Novgorod	RUS.2	16	0	1	1	18	—	—	—	—	—
2004–05	Motor Barnaul	RUS.2	8	0	1	1	14	—	—	—	—	—
2005–06	Kazakhmys Karaganda	KAZ	17	1	1	2	12	—	—	—	—	—
2005–06	Kazakhmys Karaganda	RUS.2	39	3	2	5	26	—	—	—	—	—
2006–07	Kazzinc–Torpedo	KAZ	14	3	2	5	12	—	—	—	—	—
2006–07	Gazovik Tyumen	RUS.2	56	3	12	15	78	3	1	0	1	4
2007–08	Metallurg Novokuznetsk	RSL	56	6	7	13	46	—	—	—	—	—
2008–09	CSKA Moscow	KHL	53	4	3	7	40	8	0	0	0	8
2008–09	CSKA–2 Moscow	RUS.3	—	—	—	—	—	3	1	2	3	10
2009–10	Metallurg Novokuznetsk	KHL	14	0	1	1	8	—	—	—	—	—
2009–10	Dinamo Minsk	KHL	2	0	0	0	2	—	—	—	—	—
2009–10	HC Vityaz	KHL	11	0	1	1	10	—	—	—	—	—
2010–11	HC Vityaz	KHL	41	2	3	5	50	—	—	—	—	—
2011–12	HC Yugra	KHL	1	0	0	0	0	—	—	—	—	—
2011–12	Atlant Moscow Oblast	KHL	17	0	1	1	12	3	0	0	0	6
2012–13	Hannover Scorpions	DEL	27	0	2	2	20	—	—	—	—	—
2013–14	Admiral Vladivostok	KHL	54	5	8	13	107	5	0	0	0	2
2014–15	HC Yugra	KHL	11	0	0	0	6	—	—	—	—	—
2014–15	Torpedo Nizhny Novgorod	KHL	4	0	0	0	2	—	—	—	—	—
2014–15	THK Tver	VHL	9	1	1	2	8	14	3	1	4	32
2015–16	Rytíři Kladno	CZE.2	10	1	0	1	4	6	0	2	2	10
RUS.2 totals			143	6	17	23	168	3	1	0	1	4
RSL totals			110	7	8	15	70	—	—	—	—	—
KHL totals			208	11	17	28	237	16	0	0	0	16

=== International ===
Year	Team	Event	GP	G	A	Pts	PIM
2000	Russia	U17	6	0	1	1	2
2001	Russia	WJC18	6	0	1	1	4
Junior totals			12	0	2	2	6
