= Victor Uchevatov =

Russian ice hockey player

- Born: 10 February 1983 (age 43) Angarsk, Russia
- Height: 6 ft 4 in (193 cm)
- Weight: 225 lb (102 kg; 16 st 1 lb)
- Position: Defenseman
- Shot: Left
- National team: Russia
- NHL draft: 60th overall, 2001; New Jersey Devils
- Playing career: 1999–2012

Victor Uchevatov (born 10 February 1983, in Angarsk, Russia) is a Russian former professional ice hockey player. He was drafted in the 2nd round of the 2001 NHL entry draft by the New Jersey Devils.

== Career ==
After being drafted by New Jersey in 2001, Uchevatov would play in the AHL for 6 years, getting 17 points in 269 games. He played for the Albany River Rats, the San Antonio Rampage, the Rochester Americans, and the Milwaukee Admirals. In 2004, Uchevatov was traded with Christian Berglund to the Florida Panthers in exchange for Viktor Kozlov.

After spending parts of the 2005–06 season playing for Severstal Cherepovets in Russia on a loan deal, Uchevatov returned to Russia for the 2007–08 season, where he would play for Yermak Angarsk. Uchevatov would play 4 seasons with the club, retiring in 2012.

=== International ===
Uchevatov represented Russia at the 2001 World Juniors U-18, where he would win a gold medal.

== Career statistics ==
=== Regular season and playoffs ===
			Regular season					Playoffs
Season	Team	League	GP	G	A	Pts	PIM	GP	G	A	Pts	PIM
1999–2000	Lokomotiv–2 Yaroslavl	RUS.3	1	0	0	0	0	—	—	—	—	—
2000–01	Lokomotiv–2 Yaroslavl	RUS.3	30	1	0	1	56	—	—	—	—	—
2001–02	Albany River Rats	AHL	64	0	2	2	50	—	—	—	—	—
2002–03	Albany River Rats	AHL	55	0	2	2	27	—	—	—	—	—
2003–04	Albany River Rats	AHL	52	0	3	3	46	—	—	—	—	—
2003–04	San Antonio Rampage	AHL	22	3	4	7	6	—	—	—	—	—
2004–05	San Antonio Rampage	AHL	48	1	1	2	47	—	—	—	—	—
2005–06	Rochester Americans	AHL	4	0	0	0	10	—	—	—	—	—
2005–06	Severstal Cherepovets	RSL	13	0	0	0	10	—	—	—	—	—
2005–06	Severstal–2 Cherepovets	RUS.3	4	0	0	0	2	—	—	—	—	—
2005–06	Amur Khabarovsk	RUS.2	4	0	1	1	4	—	—	—	—	—
2006–07	Milwaukee Admirals	AHL	24	0	1	1	16	1	0	0	0	0
2006–07	New Mexico Scorpions	CHL	3	0	3	3	6	—	—	—	—	—
2007–08	Reading Royals	ECHL	39	1	5	6	37	—	—	—	—	—
2008–09	Khimik–2 Voskresensk	RUS.3	13	3	0	3	12	—	—	—	—	—
2008–09	Yermak Angarsk	RUS.2	22	2	3	5	24	5	0	0	0	12
2009–10	Yermak Angarsk	RUS.2	5	0	1	1	2	—	—	—	—	—
2009–10	Yermak–2 Angarsk	RUS.3	3	0	0	0	2	—	—	—	—	—
2010–11	Yermak Angarsk	VHL	9	0	0	0	33	4	0	0	0	2
2010–11	Yermak–2 Angarsk	RUS.3	15	3	3	6	28	—	—	—	—	—
2011–12	Yermak Angarsk	VHL	38	2	2	4	36	6	0	0	0	12
AHL totals			269	4	13	17	202	1	0	0	0	0
RSL totals			13	0	0	0	10	—	—	—	—	—
RUS.2 & VHL totals			78	5	6	11	99	19	1	0	1	28

=== International ===
Year	Team	Event	GP	G	A	Pts	PIM
2000	Russia	U17	6	1	1	2	0
2001	Russia	WJC18	6	0	2	2	4
Junior totals			12	1	3	4	4
