= Maxim Kondratyev =

Russian ice hockey player

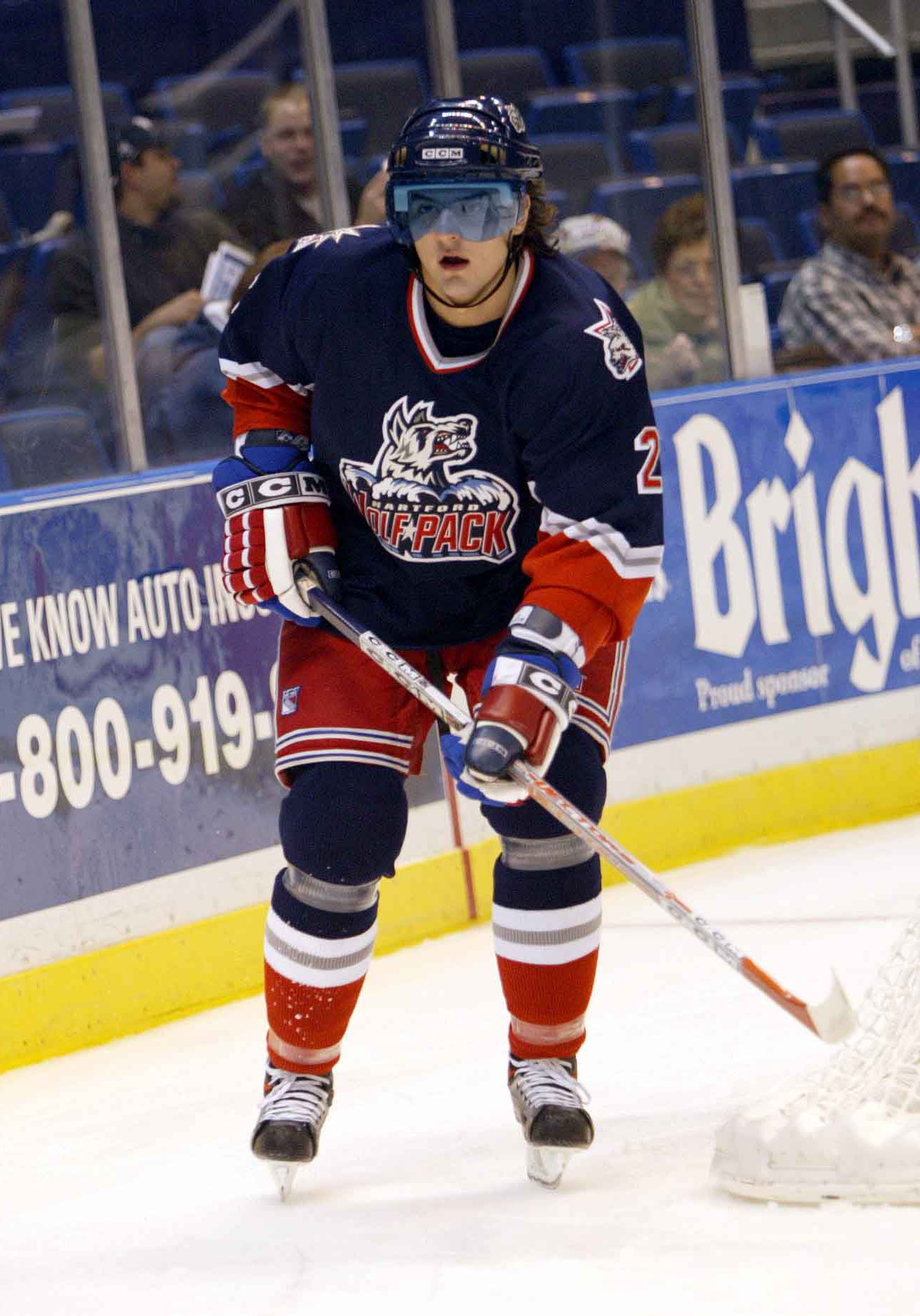
- Kondratyev with the Hartford Wolf Pack in 2004
- Born: January 20, 1983 (age 43) Tolyatti, Russian SFSR, Soviet Union
- Height: 6 ft 1 in (185 cm)
- Weight: 194 lb (88 kg; 13 st 12 lb)
- Position: Defence
- Shot: Left
- Played for: Lada Togliatti; Toronto Maple Leafs; Anaheim Ducks; New York Rangers; SKA St. Petersburg; CSKA Moscow; Salavat Yulaev Ufa; Lokomotiv Yaroslavl; Traktor Chelyabinsk; Torpedo Nizhny Novgorod; Amur Khabarovsk
- National team: Russia
- NHL draft: 168th overall, 2001; Toronto Maple Leafs
- Playing career: 2001–2021

Maxim Valeryevich Kondratyev (Russian: Максим Валерьевич Кондратьев; born January 20, 1983) is a former professional ice hockey defenceman who most notably played in the National Hockey League (NHL).

== Playing career ==
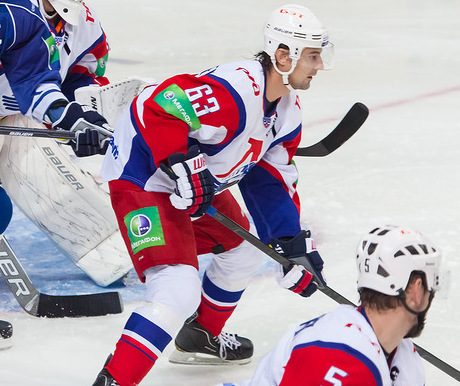
Kondratyev with Lokomotiv Yaroslavl in 2012

As a youth, Kondratyev played in the 1996 Quebec International Pee-Wee Hockey Tournament with a team from Togliatti.

He was drafted in the 6th round, 168th overall, by the Toronto Maple Leafs in the 2001 NHL entry draft.

Kondratyev skated for the Portland Pirates, the AHL affiliate team of the Mighty Ducks of Anaheim of the NHL during the second part of the 2005–06 season. He was acquired by Anaheim in a trade on January 8, 2006, from the New York Rangers.

The following season, he returned to his original club, in signing to play for Lada Togliatti in the Russian Superleague.

Kondratyev returned to Anaheim to play for the Ducks in the 07–08 season. In November 2007, he was reassigned to the club's AHL affiliate Portland Pirates, but was suspended by the club after failing to report to Portland.

He has played in Russia ever since. On May 4, 2013, Kondratyev signed a two-year contract as a free agent with Traktor Chelyabinsk.

== Career statistics ==
=== Regular season and playoffs ===
			Regular season					Playoffs
Season	Team	League	GP	G	A	Pts	PIM	GP	G	A	Pts	PIM
1998–99	Lada–2 Togliatti	RUS-3	16	0	2	2	6	—	—	—	—	—
1999–00	Lada–2 Togliatti	RUS-3	24	2	4	6	12	—	—	—	—	—
2000–01	CSK VVS Samara	RUS-2	18	2	1	3	24	—	—	—	—	—
2000–01	Lada–2 Togliatti	RUS-3	10	2	1	3	16	—	—	—	—	—
2001–02	Lada Togliatti	RSL	43	3	3	6	32	4	0	0	0	0
2001–02	Lada–2 Togliatti	RUS-3	11	2	7	9	14	—	—	—	—	—
2002–03	Lada Togliatti	RSL	47	2	3	5	56	10	0	0	0	6
2003–04	Toronto Maple Leafs	NHL	7	0	0	0	2	—	—	—	—	—
2003–04	St. John's Maple Leafs	AHL	18	3	5	8	10	—	—	—	—	—
2003–04	Lada Togliatti	RSL	29	2	3	5	85	6	0	0	0	16
2004–05	Hartford Wolf Pack	AHL	13	1	4	5	8	—	—	—	—	—
2004–05	Lada Togliatti	RSL	32	2	4	6	65	5	0	2	2	0
2004–05	Lada–2 Togliatti	RUS-3	1	1	0	1	0	—	—	—	—	—
2005–06	New York Rangers	NHL	29	1	2	3	22	—	—	—	—	—
2005–06	Hartford Wolf Pack	AHL	4	0	0	0	0	—	—	—	—	—
2005–06	Portland Pirates	AHL	37	4	13	17	19	13	5	9	14	12
2006–07	Lada Togliatti	RSL	51	3	16	29	142	3	1	0	1	2
2007–08	Anaheim Ducks	NHL	4	0	0	0	0	—	—	—	—	—
2007–08	SKA St. Petersburg	RSL	23	2	4	6	24	1	0	0	0	0
2007–08	SKA–2 St. Petersburg	RUS-3	1	0	1	1	0	—	—	—	—	—
2008–09	CSKA Moscow	KHL	42	1	11	12	51	8	0	0	0	18
2009–10	Salavat Yulaev Ufa	KHL	30	2	4	6	16	9	0	4	4	6
2010–11	Salavat Yulaev Ufa	KHL	41	5	10	15	34	20	0	4	4	8
2011–12	Salavat Yulaev Ufa	KHL	46	0	11	11	14	6	0	3	3	6
2012–13	Lokomotiv Yaroslavl	KHL	12	0	0	0	4	—	—	—	—	—
2012–13	CSKA Moscow	KHL	36	0	4	4	26	9	0	0	0	4
2013–14	Traktor Chelyabinsk	KHL	51	4	11	15	45	—	—	—	—	—
2014–15	Traktor Chelyabinsk	KHL	57	5	11	16	49	6	1	0	1	0
2015–16	Torpedo Nizhny Novgorod	KHL	32	1	6	7	12	—	—	—	—	—
2016–17	Amur Khabarovsk	KHL	60	7	12	19	62	—	—	—	—	—
2017–18	Amur Khabarovsk	KHL	47	3	12	15	43	5	0	2	2	2
2018–19	Amur Khabarovsk	KHL	34	2	2	4	16	—	—	—	—	—
2019–20	Amur Khabarovsk	KHL	15	0	2	2	10	—	—	—	—	—
2020–21	HC 19 Humenné	SVK-2	9	2	1	3	4	4	0	0	0	4
RSL totals			224	14	33	47	404	29	1	2	3	24
NHL totals			40	1	2	3	24	—	—	—	—	—
KHL totals			503	30	97	127	371	63	1	13	14	44

=== International ===
Year	Team	Event	GP	G	A	Pts	PIM
2002	Russia	WJC	7	0	1	1	2
2003	Russia	WJC	6	0	1	1	14
2004	Russia	WC	2	0	0	0	2
2007	Russia	WC	9	0	0	0	2
Junior totals			13	0	2	2	16
Senior totals			11	0	0	0	4
