= Mikko Viitanen =

Finnish ice hockey player

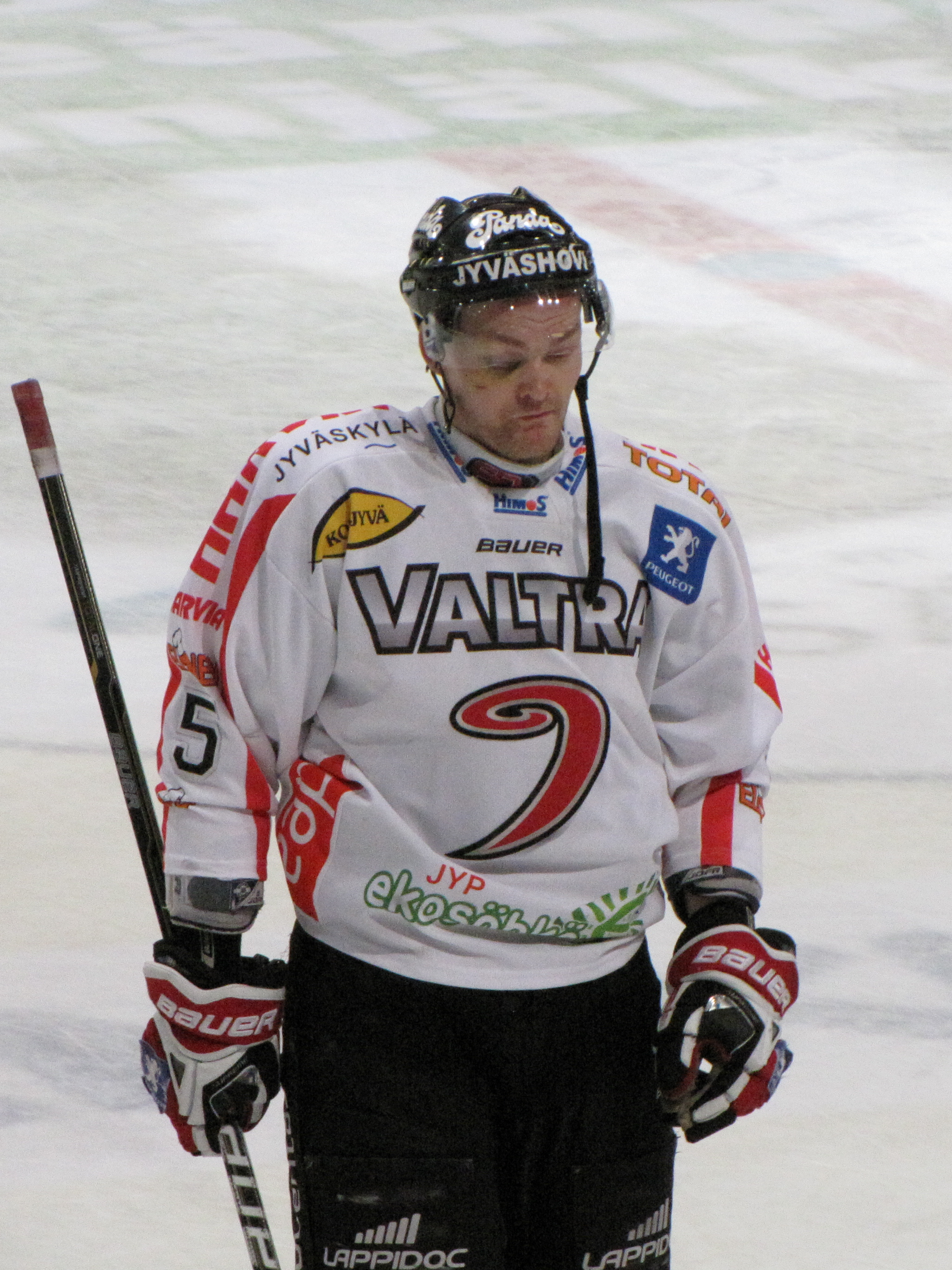
- Born: February 18, 1982 (age 44) Nurmijärvi, Finland
- Height: 6 ft 3 in (191 cm)
- Weight: 220 lb (100 kg; 15 st 10 lb)
- Position: Defence
- Shot: Left
- Played for: Blues; Hershey Bears; Lowell Lock Monsters; Lukko Rauma; JYP Jyväskylä; Ässät Pori
- NHL draft: 149th overall, 2001; Colorado Avalanche
- Playing career: 2000–2016

Mikko Viitanen (born February 18, 1982) is a Finnish former professional ice hockey defenceman who most notably played in the Finnish Liiga. He was drafted 149th overall by the Colorado Avalanche in the 2001 NHL entry draft. Viitanen previously played seven seasons with JYP, joining from fellow Liiga club Lukko Rauma in 2009.

On April 23, 2015, Viitanen joined his fourth Finnish Liiga club, in agreeing to a two-year contract with Ässät Pori. Viitanen appeared in 32 games for 5 points in the 2015–16 season. With his campaign limited due to injury and with the toll of 15 professional seasons mounting, Viitanen opted to forgo the final year of his contract with Pori and end his professional hockey career on May 31, 2016.

== Career statistics ==
=== Regular season and playoffs ===
| | | | Regular season | | | | | Playoffs |
| Season | Team | League | GP | G | A | Pts | PIM | GP | G | A | Pts | PIM |
|---|---|---|---|---|---|---|---|---|---|---|---|---|
| 1998–99 | HPK | FIN U18 | 36 | 3 | 6 | 9 | 40 | — | — | — | — | — |
| 1998–99 | HPK | FIN U20 | 1 | 0 | 0 | 0 | 0 | — | — | — | — | — |
| 1999–2000 | Chicago Freeze | NAHL | 54 | 4 | 6 | 10 | 126 | — | — | — | — | — |
| 2000–01 | Ahmat | FIN.2 U20 | 9 | 3 | 4 | 7 | 41 | — | — | — | — | — |
| 2000–01 | Ahmat | Mestis | 41 | 3 | 9 | 12 | 66 | 3 | 0 | 0 | 0 | 0 |
| 2001–02 | Blues | FIN U20 | 10 | 1 | 3 | 4 | 16 | — | — | — | — | — |
| 2001–02 | Blues | SM-l | 3 | 0 | 0 | 0 | 6 | — | — | — | — | — |
| 2001–02 | Jukurit | Mestis | 21 | 0 | 3 | 3 | 26 | — | — | — | — | — |
| 2002–03 | Blues | FIN U20 | 1 | 0 | 0 | 0 | 0 | — | — | — | — | — |
| 2002–03 | Blues | SM-l | 1 | 0 | 0 | 0 | 0 | — | — | — | — | — |
| 2002–03 | Haukat | Mestis | 9 | 0 | 1 | 1 | 56 | — | — | — | — | — |
| 2003–04 | Hershey Bears | AHL | 20 | 1 | 1 | 2 | 14 | — | — | — | — | — |
| 2003–04 | Reading Royals | ECHL | 47 | 0 | 4 | 4 | 21 | 13 | 0 | 1 | 1 | 8 |
| 2004–05 | Hershey Bears | AHL | 22 | 0 | 1 | 1 | 6 | — | — | — | — | — |
| 2004–05 | Reading Royals | ECHL | 52 | 3 | 3 | 6 | 47 | — | — | — | — | — |
| 2005–06 | Lowell Lock Monsters | AHL | 72 | 1 | 7 | 8 | 56 | — | — | — | — | — |
| 2006–07 | Lukko | SM-l | 51 | 8 | 16 | 24 | 44 | 2 | 0 | 2 | 2 | 2 |
| 2007–08 | Lukko | SM-l | 13 | 2 | 0 | 2 | 6 | — | — | — | — | — |
| 2008–09 | Lukko | SM-l | 18 | 0 | 0 | 0 | 6 | — | — | — | — | — |
| 2008–09 | JYP | SM-l | 37 | 2 | 6 | 8 | 30 | 15 | 3 | 1 | 4 | 6 |
| 2009–10 | JYP | SM-l | 48 | 2 | 6 | 8 | 44 | 12 | 0 | 1 | 1 | 2 |
| 2010–11 | JYP | SM-l | 55 | 0 | 3 | 3 | 61 | 10 | 1 | 2 | 3 | 29 |
| 2010–11 | D Team | Mestis | 1 | 0 | 0 | 0 | 0 | — | — | — | — | — |
| 2011–12 | JYP | SM-l | 35 | 0 | 4 | 4 | 36 | 14 | 3 | 1 | 4 | 18 |
| 2012–13 | JYP | SM-l | 36 | 2 | 1 | 3 | 58 | 9 | 1 | 0 | 1 | 26 |
| 2013–14 | JYP | Liiga | 13 | 0 | 1 | 1 | 6 | 3 | 0 | 0 | 0 | 2 |
| 2014–15 | JYP | Liiga | 21 | 2 | 0 | 2 | 34 | 8 | 0 | 0 | 0 | 14 |
| 2015–16 | Ässät | Liiga | 32 | 1 | 4 | 5 | 37 | — | — | — | — | — |
| Liiga totals | | | 363 | 19 | 41 | 60 | 368 | 73 | 8 | 7 | 15 | 99 |
| AHL totals | | | 114 | 2 | 9 | 11 | 76 | — | — | — | — | — |

Medal record

Representing Finland

Ice hockey

World Junior Championships
| Bronze medal – third place | 2002 Pardubice | |

=== International ===
| Year | Team | Event | Result | GP | G | A | Pts | PIM |
|---|---|---|---|---|---|---|---|---|
| 2002 | Finland | WJC | 3rd place, bronze medalist(s) | 7 | 0 | 0 | 0 | 4 |
| Junior totals | | | | 7 | 0 | 0 | 0 | 4 |
