= 2000 World U-17 Hockey Challenge =

The 2000 World U-17 Hockey Challenge was hosted by Timmins, Ontario (and various communities) from December 27, 1999, to January 3, 2000. The event was won by Russia who beat Ontario in the Final 2-0.

== Teams ==
The participating teams included:

- Canada Atlantic
- Canada Quebec
- Canada Ontario
- Canada West
- Canada Pacific
- Germany
- Czech Republic
- Russia
- United States
- Finland

The winning Russian team roster:

- Nikita Vdovenko
- Andrei Medvedev
- Igor Kyazev
- Vladimir Korsunov
- Alexandre Frantsouzov
- Victor Outchevatov
- Maxim Kondratiev
- Artem Ternavski
- Renat Mamachev
- Leonid Zhvatchkin
- Stanislav Pupyrev
- Ilya Kovalchuk
- Timofei Shishkanov
- Yuri Trubachev
- Alexander Blokhin
- Konstantin Mikhailov
- Alexei Kigorodov
- Alexander Poloushin
- Stanislav Tchistov
- Evgueni Artioukhin
- Oleg Minakov
- Vladislav Evseev

== Results ==
=== Final standings ===
	Team
1st place, gold medalist(s)	Russia
2nd place, silver medalist(s)	Canada Ontario
3rd place, bronze medalist(s)	Canada Pacific
4	United States
5	Canada West
6	Czech Republic
7	Canada Quebec
8	Canada Atlantic
9	Finland
10	Germany
