= 2001–02 NHL transactions =

The following is a list of all team-to-team transactions that have occurred in the National Hockey League during the 2001–02 NHL season. It lists what team each player has been traded to, signed by, or claimed by, and for which players or draft picks, if applicable.

== Free agency ==
Note: This does not include players who have re-signed with their previous team as an Unrestricted Free Agent or as a Restricted Free Agent.

May 21, 2001	To Columbus Blue Jackets Brett Harkins	From Houston Aeros (IHL)
May 24, 2001	To Detroit Red Wings Fredrik Olausson	From SC Bern (Swiss)
May 30, 2001	To Nashville Predators Vladimir Orszagh	From Djurgardens IF (Sweden)
July 1, 2001	To Calgary Flames Ryan Christie	From Utah Grizzlies (IHL)
July 1, 2001	To Boston Bruins Sean O'Donnell	From Minnesota Wild
July 1, 2001	To Chicago Blackhawks Jon Klemm	From Colorado Avalanche
July 1, 2001	To Dallas Stars Pierre Turgeon	From St. Louis Blues
July 1, 2001	To Dallas Stars Rob DiMaio	From Carolina Hurricanes
July 1, 2001	To New York Islanders Garth Snow	From Pittsburgh Penguins
July 1, 2001	To New York Rangers Dave Karpa	From Carolina Hurricanes
July 2, 2001	To Boston Bruins Martin Lapointe	From Detroit Red Wings
July 2, 2001	To Calgary Flames Bob Boughner	From Pittsburgh Penguins
July 2, 2001	To Dallas Stars Donald Audette	From Buffalo Sabres
July 2, 2001	To Detroit Red Wings Luc Robitaille	From Los Angeles Kings
July 2, 2001	To Philadelphia Flyers Jeremy Roenick	From Phoenix Coyotes
July 2, 2001	To Minnesota Wild Jason Marshall	From Washington Capitals
July 2, 2001	To Minnesota Wild Dwayne Roloson	From St. Louis Blues
July 2, 2001	To Los Angeles Kings Brett Hauer	From Manitoba Moose (IHL)
July 2, 2001	To Los Angeles Kings Ken Belanger	From Boston Bruins
July 2, 2001	To Nashville Predators Stu Grimson	From Los Angeles Kings
July 3, 2001	To Los Angeles Kings Steve Heinze	From Buffalo Sabres
July 3, 2001	To Toronto Maple Leafs Alexander Mogilny	From New Jersey Devils
July 3, 2001	To Mighty Ducks of Anaheim Jason York	From Ottawa Senators
July 4, 2001	To Montreal Canadiens Yanic Perreault	From Toronto Maple Leafs
July 4, 2001	To Toronto Maple Leafs Anders Eriksson	From Florida Panthers
July 5, 2001	To Columbus Blue Jackets Mike Sillinger	From Ottawa Senators
July 5, 2001	To St. Louis Blues Rich Pilon	From New York Rangers
July 5, 2001	To Philadelphia Flyers Eric Weinrich	From Boston Bruins
July 5, 2001	To Dallas Stars Valeri Kamensky	From New York Rangers
July 5, 2001	To St. Louis Blues Mike Keane	From Dallas Stars
July 5, 2001	To New Jersey Devils Tommy Albelin	From Calgary Flames
July 5, 2001	To Pittsburgh Penguins Mike Wilson	From Florida Panthers
July 5, 2001	To New York Islanders Ken Sutton	From New Jersey Devils
July 6, 2001	To Boston Bruins Rob Zamuner	From Ottawa Senators
July 6, 2001	To Minnesota Wild Andrew Brunette	From Atlanta Thrashers
July 7, 2001	To Los Angeles Kings Randy Robitaille	From Nashville Predators
July 7, 2001	To New York Islanders Shawn Bates	From Boston Bruins
July 7, 2001	To Columbus Blue Jackets David Ling	From Dallas Stars
July 8, 2001	To Nashville Predators Brett Hauer	From Manitoba Moose (AHL)
July 9, 2001	To Philadelphia Flyers Marty Murray	From Calgary Flames
July 9, 2001	To Calgary Flames Kay Whitmore	From Boston Bruins
July 9, 2001	To Minnesota Wild Martin Brochu	From Calgary Flames
July 10, 2001	To Dallas Stars Jim Montgomery	From San Jose Sharks
July 10, 2001	To Columbus Blue Jackets Darrel Scoville	From Calgary Flames
July 13, 2001	To Tampa Bay Lightning Dave Andreychuk	From Buffalo Sabres
July 13, 2001	To Tampa Bay Lightning Grant Ledyard	From Dallas Stars
July 13, 2001	To Ottawa Senators Chris Herperger	From Chicago Blackhawks
July 15, 2001	To New York Islanders Marko Kiprusoff	From Kloten Flyers (Swiss)
July 16, 2001	To Atlanta Thrashers Bob Corkum	From New Jersey Devils
July 16, 2001	To Atlanta Thrashers Todd Reirden	From St. Louis Blues
July 17, 2001	To New York Rangers Zdeno Ciger	From Minnesota Wild
July 17, 2001	To Chicago Blackhawks Steve Thomas	From Toronto Maple Leafs
July 17, 2001	To Dallas Stars Greg Hawgood	From Vancouver Canucks
July 17, 2001	To Carolina Hurricanes Tom Barrasso	From Ottawa Senators
July 18, 2001	To New York Islanders Marko Tuomainen	From Los Angeles Kings
July 18, 2001	To Florida Panthers Jeff Norton	From San Jose Sharks
July 20, 2001	To New York Rangers Igor Ulanov	From Edmonton Oilers
July 23, 2001	To Colorado Avalanche Jeff Daw	From Minnesota Wild
July 23, 2001	To Boston Bruins Tony Tuzzolino	From New York Rangers
July 24, 2001	To Colorado Avalanche Todd Gill	From Detroit Red Wings
July 24, 2001	To Toronto Maple Leafs Paul Healey	From Edmonton Oilers
July 24, 2001	To Toronto Maple Leafs Bob Wren	From Mighty Ducks of Anaheim
July 24, 2001	To Boston Bruins Chris Kelleher	From Pittsburgh Penguins
July 24, 2001	To New York Rangers P. J. Stock	From Philadelphia Flyers
July 25, 2001	To Atlanta Thrashers Tony Hrkac	From Mighty Ducks of Anaheim
July 26, 2001	To Boston Bruins Scott Pellerin	From Carolina Hurricanes
July 27, 2001	To Florida Panthers Brad Norton	From Hamilton Bulldogs (AHL)
July 27, 2001	To Mighty Ducks of Anaheim Drew Bannister	From New York Rangers
July 31, 2001	To Minnesota Wild Brad Brown	From New York Rangers
July 31, 2001	To Chicago Blackhawks Pascal Rheaume	From St. Louis Blues
August 1, 2001	To Washington Capitals Peter Ferraro	From Boston Bruins
August 1, 2001	To Mighty Ducks of Anaheim Aris Brimanis	From Chicago Wolves (IHL)
August 1, 2001	To Chicago Blackhawks Mike Peluso	From St. Louis Blues
August 2, 2001	To Florida Panthers Wade Flaherty	From Tampa Bay Lightning
August 2, 2001	To Calgary Flames Jamie Wright	From Utah Grizzlies (IHL)
August 3, 2001	To Buffalo Sabres Bob Essensa	From Vancouver Canucks
August 8, 2001	To Boston Bruins John Emmons	From Tampa Bay Lightning
August 8, 2001	To Nashville Predators Rich Brennan	From Los Angeles Kings
August 11, 2001	To Colorado Avalanche Jaroslav Obsut	From St. Louis Blues
August 11, 2001	To Vancouver Canucks Herberts Vasiljevs	From Orlando Solar Bears (IHL)
August 14, 2001	To Buffalo Sabres Rory Fitzpatrick	From Edmonton Oilers
August 16, 2001	To Los Angeles Kings Rob Valicevic	From Nashville Predators
August 17, 2001	To New York Islanders Dave Roche	From Calgary Flames
August 21, 2001	To Florida Panthers Matt Herr	From Philadelphia Flyers
August 21, 2001	To Tampa Bay Lightning Ryan Tobler	From New York Rangers
August 21, 2001	To St. Louis Blues Christian Laflamme	From Montreal Canadiens
August 22, 2001	To Detroit Red Wings Brett Hull	From Dallas Stars
August 22, 2001	To Calgary Flames Alan Letang	From Dallas Stars
August 23, 2001	To Los Angeles Kings Jason Holland	From Buffalo Sabres
August 23, 2001	To Florida Panthers Bill Lindsay	From San Jose Sharks
August 24, 2001	To New York Islanders Jason Podollan	From Tampa Bay Lightning
August 28, 2001	To New York Rangers Steve McKenna	From Pittsburgh Penguins
August 30, 2001	To Ottawa Senators Steve Martins	From New York Islanders
August 31, 2001	To Dallas Stars Pat Verbeek	From Detroit Red Wings
September 5, 2001	To Chicago Blackhawks Vladimir Chebaturkin	From St. Louis Blues
September 5, 2001	To Colorado Avalanche Pascal Trepanier	From Mighty Ducks of Anaheim
September 5, 2001	To Chicago Blackhawks Matt Henderson	From Philadelphia Flyers
September 6, 2001	To San Jose Sharks Mike Craig	From Colorado Avalanche
September 10, 2001	To Montreal Canadiens Reid Simpson	From St. Louis Blues
September 10, 2001	To Chicago Blackhawks Peter White	From Philadelphia Flyers
September 17, 2001	To Columbus Blue Jackets Derrick Walser	From Calgary Flames
September 18, 2001	To Calgary Flames Craig Berube	From New York Islanders
October 1, 2001	To Toronto Maple Leafs Corey Schwab	From Vancouver Canucks
October 2, 2001	To Pittsburgh Penguins Stephane Richer	From Washington Capitals
October 5, 2001	To New York Rangers Bryan Berard	From Toronto Maple Leafs
October 5, 2001	To Boston Bruins Dennis Bonvie	From Pittsburgh Penguins
October 5, 2001	To Montreal Canadiens Doug Gilmour	From Buffalo Sabres
October 15, 2001	To Vancouver Canucks Justin Kurtz	From Manitoba Moose (IHL)
October 21, 2001	To New Jersey Devils Bruce Gardiner	From Columbus Blue Jackets
October 22, 2001	To Detroit Red Wings Ladislav Kohn	From Atlanta Thrashers
October 23, 2001	To Tampa Bay Lightning Gaetan Royer	From Calgary Flames
October 25, 2001	To New Jersey Devils Joel Bouchard	From Phoenix Coyotes
November 7, 2001	To Vancouver Canucks Peter Skudra	From Boston Bruins
November 19, 2001	To Chicago Blackhawks Jim Campbell	From Montreal Canadiens
November 26, 2001	To St. Louis Blues Marc Bergevin	From Pittsburgh Penguins
January 8, 2002	To Washington Capitals Colin Forbes	From New York Rangers
January 16, 2002	To New York Islanders Kip Miller	From Grand Rapids (AHL)
January 16, 2002	To St. Louis Blues Ted Donato	From Dallas Stars
January 24, 2002	To Ottawa Senators Jody Hull	From Philadelphia Flyers
February 4, 2002	To New Jersey Devils John Vanbiesbrouck	From New Jersey Devils
February 26, 2002	To Dallas Stars John MacLean	From Dallas Stars

== Waiver ==
April 11, 2001	To Montreal Canadiens Benoit Gratton	To Calgary Flames Claimed on waivers
May 18, 2001	To Columbus Blue Jackets Sean Pronger	To New York Islanders Claimed on waivers
June 1, 2001	To Nashville Predators Bill Bowler	To Columbus Blue Jackets Claimed on waivers
June 19, 2001	To Nashville Predators Yves Sarault	To Atlanta Thrashers Claimed on waivers
August 7, 2001	To New York Rangers Darren Van Impe	To Boston Bruins Claimed on waivers
September 28, 2001	To New York Islanders Chris Osgood	To Detroit Red Wings Claimed on waiver draft
September 28, 2001	To Vancouver Canucks Martin Brochu	To Minnesota Wild Claimed on waiver draft
September 28, 2001	To Chicago Blackhawks Phil Housley	To Calgary Flames Claimed on waiver draft
September 28, 2001	To Boston Bruins P. J. Stock	To New York Rangers Claimed on waiver draft
September 28, 2001	To Tampa Bay Lightning Glen Metropolit	To Washington Capitals Claimed on waiver draft
September 28, 2001	To Minnesota Wild Sebastien Bordeleau	To St. Louis Blues Claimed on waiver draft
September 28, 2001	To Columbus Blue Jackets Kirk Muller	To Dallas Stars Claimed on waiver draft
October 25, 2001	To Carolina Hurricanes Josh Holden	To Vancouver Canucks Claimed on waivers
October 2, 2001	To Pittsburgh Penguins John Jakopin	To Florida Panthers Claimed on waivers
October 3, 2001	To New York Rangers Rico Fata	To Calgary Flames Claimed on waivers
October 14, 2001	To Boston Bruins Jamie Rivers	To Ottawa Senators Claimed on waivers
October 20, 2001	To Washington Capitals Glen Metropolit	To Tampa Bay Lightning Claimed on waivers
October 25, 2001	To Vancouver Canucks Josh Holden	To Carolina Hurricanes Claimed on waivers
October 30, 2001	To Vancouver Canucks Alexei Tezikov	To Mighty Ducks of Anaheim Claimed on waivers
November 14, 2001	To Atlanta Thrashers Pascal Rheaume	To Chicago Blackhawks Claimed on waivers
December 18, 2001	To Florida Panthers Darren Van Impe	To New York Rangers Claimed on waivers
January 2, 2002	To Nashville Predators Robert Schnabel	To Phoenix Coyotes Claimed on waivers
January 4, 2002	To Pittsburgh Penguins Randy Robitaille	To Los Angeles Kings Claimed on waivers
January 12, 2002	To Florida Panthers Pierre Dagenais	To New Jersey Devils Claimed on waivers
January 12, 2002	To Dallas Stars Scott Pellerin	To Boston Bruins Claimed on waivers
January 16, 2002	To New York Rangers Trent Whitfield	To Washington Capitals Claimed on waivers
January 19, 2002	To Washington Capitals Ivan Ciernik	To Ottawa Senators Claimed on waivers
January 30, 2002	To Nashville Predators Reid Simpson	To Montreal Canadiens Claimed on waivers
January 30, 2002	To Los Angeles Kings Ted Donato	To New York Islanders Claimed on waivers
February 1, 2002	To Washington Capitals Trent Whitfield	To New York Rangers Claimed on waivers
March 6, 2002	To St. Louis Blues Ted Donato	To Los Angeles Kings Claimed on waivers
March 15, 2002	To Pittsburgh Penguins Shean Donovan	To Atlanta Thrashers Claimed on waivers
March 16, 2002	To Pittsburgh Penguins Jeff Toms	To New York Rangers Claimed on waivers
March 19, 2002	To Los Angeles Kings Ted Donato	To St. Louis Blues Claimed on waivers
March 19, 2002	To Washington Capitals Benoit Hogue	To Boston Bruins Claimed on waivers
March 19, 2002	To Montreal Canadiens Bill Lindsay	To Florida Panthers Claimed on waivers

== May ==
May 24, 2001	To Nashville Predators Mikhail Chernov	To Philadelphia Flyers Mike Watt
May 31, 2001	To Vancouver Canucks Alex Auld	To Florida Panthers 2nd-rd pick - 2001 entry draft (NJD - # 48 - Tuomas Pihlman)^{1} 3rd-rd pick - 2002 entry draft (BUF - # 82 - John Adams)^{2}

1. Florida's acquired second-round pick went to New Jersey as the result of a trade on June 23, 2001 that sent a first-round pick in the 2001 Entry Draft to Florida in exchange for a second-round pick (# 44 overall) in the 2001 Entry Draft and this pick.
2. Atlanta's acquired third-round pick went to Buffalo as the result of a trade on June 22, 2002 that sent Vyacheslav Kozlov and a second-round pick (# 41 overall) in the 2002 Entry Draft to Atlanta in exchange for a second-round pick (# 31 overall) in the 2002 Entry Draft and this pick.
  Atlanta previously acquired this pick as the result of a trade on June 22, 2002 that sent future considerations (Atlanta's promise not to draft Jay Bouwmeester # 2 overall in 2002 NHL draft) to Florida in exchange for a fourth-round pick in the 2003 entry draft and this pick.

== June ==
June 12, 2001	To Toronto Maple Leafs Robert Reichel; Travis Green; Craig Mills	To Phoenix Coyotes Danny Markov
June 15, 2001	To Montreal Canadiens Rights to Joe Juneau	To Phoenix Coyotes Future considerations
June 18, 2001	To Tampa Bay Lightning Juha Ylonen	To Phoenix Coyotes Todd Warriner
June 19, 2001	To Mighty Ducks of Anaheim Keith Carney	To Phoenix Coyotes 2nd-rd pick - 2001 entry draft (CGY - # 41 - Andrei Taratukhin)^{1}
June 22, 2001	To Toronto Maple Leafs Mikael Renberg	To Phoenix Coyotes Sergei Berezin
June 22, 2001	To Tampa Bay Lightning Mathieu Biron; 2nd-rd pick - 2002 entry draft (VAN - # 55 - Denis Grot)^{2}	To New York Islanders Adrian Aucoin; Alexander Kharitonov
June 23, 2001	To New York Islanders Alexei Yashin	To Ottawa Senators Zdeno Chara; Bill Muckalt; 1st-rd pick - 2001 entry draft (# 2 - Jason Spezza)
June 23, 2001	To Phoenix Coyotes 1st-rd pick - 2001 entry draft (# 11 - Fredrik Sjostrom)	To Calgary Flames 1st-rd pick - 2001 entry draft (# 14 - Chuck Kobasew); 2nd-rd pick - 2001 entry draft (# 41 - Andrei Taratukhin)
June 23, 2001	To Ottawa Senators 1st-rd pick - 2001 entry draft (# 23 - Tim Gleason)	To Philadelphia Flyers 1st-rd pick - 2001 entry draft (# 27 - Jeff Woywitka); 7th-rd pick - 2001 entry draft (# 225 - David Printz); 2nd-rd pick - 2002 entry draft (DAL - # 34 - Tobias Stephan)^{3}
June 23, 2001	To Florida Panthers 1st-rd pick - 2001 entry draft (# 24 - Lukas Krajicek)	To New Jersey Devils 2nd-rd pick - 2001 entry draft (# 44 - Igor Pohanka); 2nd-rd pick - 2001 entry draft (# 48 - Tuomas Pihlman)
June 23, 2001	To Philadelphia Flyers rights to Jiri Dopita	To Florida Panthers 2nd-rd pick in 2001 entry draft (CGY - # 56 - Andrei Medvedev)^{4}
June 23, 2001	To Florida Panthers Valeri Bure; Jason Wiemer	To Calgary Flames Rob Niedermayer; 2nd-round pick in 2001 entry draft (# 56 - Andrei Medvedev)
June 23, 2001	To New Jersey Devils 2nd-rd pick - 2001 entry draft (# 60 - Victor Uchevatov)	To Ottawa Senators 3rd-rd pick - 2001 entry draft (# 81 - Neil Komadoski); 3rd-rd pick - 2001 entry draft (TBL - # 94 - Evgeny Artyukhin)^{5}
June 23, 2001	To Tampa Bay Lightning 2nd-rd pick - 2001 entry draft (# 61 - Andreas Holmqvist)	To Washington Capitals 2nd-rd pick - 2002 entry draft (VAN - # 55 - Denis Grot)^{6}
June 23, 2001	To Florida Panthers 3rd-rd pick - 2001 entry draft (# 64 - Tomas Malec)	To New York Islanders 4th-rd pick - 2001 entry draft (# 101 - Cory Stillman); 3rd-rd pick - 2002 entry draft (FLA - # 67 - Gregory Campbell)^{7}
June 23, 2001	To New York Rangers 3rd-rd pick - 2001 entry draft (# 79 - Garth Murray); 5th-rd pick - 2001 entry draft (# 139 - Shawn Collymore)	To Minnesota Wild 3rd-rd pick - 2001 entry draft (# 74 - Chris Heid)
June 23, 2001	To Phoenix Coyotes 3rd-rd pick - 2001 entry draft (# 78 - Beat Forster)	To New Jersey Devils 4th-rd pick - 2001 entry draft (ATL - # 112 - Milan Gajic)^{8} 3rd-round pick in 2002 entry draft (# 84 - Marek Chvatal)
June 23, 2001	To Chicago Blackhawks Igor Korolev	To Toronto Maple Leafs 3rd-rd pick - 2001 entry draft (# 88 - Nicolas Corbeil)
June 23, 2001	To Tampa Bay Lightning 3rd-rd pick - 2001 entry draft (#94 - Evgeny Artyukhin)	To Ottawa Senators 4th-rd pick - 2001 entry draft (# 99 - Ray Emery); 7th-rd pick - 2001 entry draft (# 218 - Jan Platil)
June 23, 2001	To Nashville Predators 4th-rd pick - 2001 entry draft (# 98 - Jordin Tootoo)	To Philadelphia Flyers 4th-round pick in 2001 entry draft (CAR - # 110 - Rob Zepp)^{9} 5th-round pick in 2001 entry draft (# 146 - Jussi Timonen); 7th-round pick in 2001 entry draft (#208 - Thierry Douville)
June 23, 2001	To Chicago Blackhawks 4th-rd pick - 2001 entry draft (# 104 - Brent MacLellan)	To Montreal Canadiens Stephane Quintal
June 23, 2001	To St. Louis Blues 4th-rd pick - 2001 entry draft (# 122 - Igor Valeev)	To Atlanta Thrashers Lubos Bartecko
June 23, 2001	To St. Louis Blues Fred Brathwaite; Daniel Tkaczuk; Sergei Varlamov; 9th-rd pick - 2001 entry draft (# 270 - Grant Jacobsen)	To Calgary Flames Roman Turek; 4th-rd pick - 2001 entry draft (# 124 - Egor Shastin)
June 23, 2001	To Dallas Stars Jyrki Lumme	To Phoenix Coyotes Tyler Bouck
June 23, 2001	To New York Rangers Chris St. Croix	To Calgary Flames Burke Henry
June 24, 2001	To San Jose Sharks 4th-rd pick - 2001 entry draft (# 106 - Christian Ehrhoff)	To Chicago Blackhawks 4th-rd pick - 2001 entry draft (# 119 - Aleksey Zotkin); 6th-rd pick - 2001 entry draft (# 186 - Petr Puncochar); 7th-rd pick - 2001 entry draft (#216 - Oleg Minakov)
June 24, 2001	To Carolina Hurricanes 4th-rd pick - 2001 entry draft (# 110 - Rob Zepp)	To Philadelphia Flyers 3rd-rd pick - 2002 entry draft (CAR - # 91 - Jesse Lane)^{10}
June 24, 2001	To Atlanta Thrashers 4th-rd pick - 2001 entry draft (#112 - Milan Gajic); 7th-rd pick - 2002 entry draft (SJS - # 217 - Tim Conboy)^{11}	To New Jersey Devils 3rd-rd pick - 2002 entry draft (# 64 - Jason Ryznar)
June 24, 2001	To Tampa Bay Lightning 4th-rd pick - 2001 entry draft (#123 - Aaron Lobb); 5th-rd pick - 2001 entry draft (# 138 - Paul Lynch); 7th-rd pick - 2001 entry draft (# 219 - Dennis Packard)	To Philadelphia Flyers 3rd-rd pick - 2002 entry draft (VAN - # 68 - Brett Skinner)^{12}
June 24, 2001	To Buffalo Sabres 5th-rd pick - 2001 entry draft (# 155 - Michal Vondrka); 8th-rd pick - 2001 entry draft (# 234 - Calle Aslund); 9th-rd pick - 2001 entry draft (# 279 - Ryan Jorde)	To San Jose Sharks 5th-rd pick - 2001 entry draft (# 140 - Tomas Plihal)
June 24, 2001	To Colorado Avalanche 5th-rd pick - 2001 entry draft (# 149 - Mikko Viitanen)	To Carolina Hurricanes Chris Dingman
June 24, 2001	To Los Angeles Kings 5th-rd pick - 2001 entry draft (# 152 - Terry Denike)	To Tampa Bay Lightning 6th-rd pick - 2001 entry draft (COL - # 184 - Scott Horvath)^{13} 6th-rd pick - 2001 entry draft (# 188 - Art Femenella)
June 24, 2001	To Columbus Blue Jackets Rights to Paul Manning	To Calgary Flames 5th-rd pick - 2001 entry draft (DET - # 157 - Andreas Jamtin)^{14}
June 24, 2001	To Calgary Flames 5th-rd pick - 2001 entry draft (# 164 - Yuri Trubachev); 7th-rd pick - 2001 entry draft (NYR - # 226 - Pontus Petterstrom)^{15}	To Detroit Red Wings 5th-rd pick - 2001 entry draft (# 157 - Andreas Jamtin)
June 24, 2001	To Colorado Avalanche 6th-rd pick - 2001 entry draft (#184 - Scott Horvath)	To Tampa Bay Lightning Nolan Pratt
June 24, 2001	To New York Rangers 7th-rd pick - 2001 entry draft (# 226 - Pontus Petterstrom)	To Calgary Flames 7th-rd pick - 2002 entry draft (# 207 - Pierre Johnsson)
June 24, 2001	To New York Rangers 8th-rd pick - 2001 entry draft (# 230 - Leonid Zvachkin)	To Atlanta Thrashers rights to Jeff Dessner
June 24, 2001	To Ottawa Senators 8th-rd pick - 2001 entry draft (# 235 - Neil Petruic)	To Montreal Canadiens Andreas Dackell
June 24, 2001	To Tampa Bay Lightning 8th-rd pick - 2001 entry draft (# 252 - Jean-Francois Soucy); 9th-rd pick - 2002 entry draft (# 287 - John Toffey)	To Philadelphia Flyers 7th-rd pick - 2002 entry draft (# 201 - Mathieu Brunelle)
June 24, 2001	To Tampa Bay Lightning 9th-rd pick - 2001 entry draft (# 289 - Henrik Bergfors)	To Colorado Avalanche 9th-rd pick - 2002 entry draft (NAS - # 264 - Matthew Davis)^{16}
June 24, 2001	To San Jose Sharks Adam Graves; Future considerations	To New York Rangers Mikael Samuelsson; Christian Gosselin
June 24, 2001	To New York Islanders Rights to Michael Peca	To Buffalo Sabres Tim Connolly; Taylor Pyatt
June 24, 2001	To Calgary Flames Dean McAmmond	To Philadelphia Flyers 4th-rd pick - 2002 entry draft (# 105 - Rosario Ruggeri)
June 24, 2001	To Boston Bruins Richard Jackman	To Dallas Stars Cameron Mann
June 29, 2001	To Minnesota Wild Sergei Zholtok	To Edmonton Oilers Future considerations (7th-rd pick - 2002 entry draft # 205 - Jean-Francois Dufort)
June 29, 2001	To Ottawa Senators Jason Doig; Jeff Ulmer	To New York Rangers Sean Gagnon; Future considerations
June 29, 2001	To Florida Panthers Future considerations	To New York Rangers Dave Duerden
June 29, 2001	To San Jose Sharks Rich Pilon	To New York Rangers 7th-rd pick - 2002 entry draft (# 226 - Joey Crabb)
June 30, 2001	To Detroit Red Wings Dominik Hasek	To Buffalo Sabres Vyacheslav Kozlov; 1st-rd pick - 2002 entry draft (ATL - # 30 - Jim Slater)^{17} conditional pick - 2023 entry draft^{18}
June 30, 2001	To Tampa Bay Lightning Nils Ekman; Kyle Freadrich	To New York Rangers Tim Taylor

1. Phoenix's acquired second-round pick went to Calgary as the result of a trade on June 23, 2001, that sent a first-round pick in the 2001 entry draft (# 11 overall) to Phoenix in exchange for a first-round pick in the 2001 entry draft (# 14 overall) and this pick.
2. Washington's acquired second-round pick went to Vancouver as the result of a trade on November 10, 2001 that sent a first-round pick in the 2002 entry draft and a third-round pick in the 2003 entry draft to Washington in exchange for Trevor Linden and this pick.
  Washington previously acquired this pick as the result of a trade on June 23, 2001 that sent a second-round pick in the 2003 entry draft to Tampa Bay in exchange for this pick.
3. Tampa Bay's acquired second-round pick went to Dallas as the result of a trade on June 22, 2002 that sent Brad Lukowich and a seventh-round pick in the 2003 entry draft to Tampa Bay in exchange for this pick.
  Tampa Bay previously acquired this pick as the result of a trade on June 21, 2002 that sent a first-round pick (# 4 overall) in the 2002 entry draft to Philadelphia in exchange for Ruslan Fedotenko, a second-round pick (# 52 overall) in the 2002 entry draft and this pick.
4. Florida's acquired second-round pick went to Calgary as the result of a trade on June 23, 2001 that sent the Valeri Bure and Jason Wiemer to Florida in exchange for Rob Niedermayer and this pick.
5. Ottawa's acquired third-round pick went to Tampa Bay as the result of a trade on June 23, 2001, that sent a fourth-round pick and seventh-round pick in the 2001 entry draft to Ottawa in exchange for this pick.
6. Washington's acquired second-round pick went to Vancouver as the result of a trade on November 10, 2001 that sent a first-round pick in the 2002 entry draft and a third-round pick in the 2003 entry draft to Washington in exchange for Trevor Linden and this pick.
7. Florida third-round pick was re-acquired as the result of a trade on June 22, 2002 that sent Eric Godard to the Islanders in exchange for this pick.
8. New Jersey's acquired fourth-round pick went to Atlanta as the result of a trade on June 24, 2001 that sent a third-round pick in the 2002 entry draft to New Jersey in exchange for a seventh-round pick in the 2002 entry draft and this pick.
9. Philadelphia's acquired fourth-round pick went to Carolina as the result of a trade on June 24, 2001 that sent a third-round pick in the 2002 entry draft to Philadelphia in exchange for this pick.
10. Carolina's third-round pick was re-acquired as the result of a trade on June 22, 2002 that sent a sixth-round pick in the 2002 entry draft and a third-round pick in the 2003 entry draft to Philadelphia in exchange for this pick.
  Atlanta's acquired seventh-round pick went to San Jose as the result of a trade on June 23, 2002 that sent an eighth-round in the 2002 Entry Draft and a seventh-round pick in the 2003 entry draft to Atlanta in exchange for this pick.
11. Atlanta's acquired seventh-round pick went to San Jose as the result of a trade on June 23, 2002 that sent an eighth-round in the 2002 entry draft and a seventh-round pick in the 2003 entry draft to Atlanta in exchange for this pick.
12. Philadelphia's acquired third-round pick went to Vancouver as the result of a trade on December 17, 2001 that sent Donald Brashear and a sixth-round pick in the 2002 entry draft in exchange for Jan Hlavac this pick.
13. Tampa Bay's acquired sixth-round pick went to Colorado as the result of a trade on June 24, 2001 that sent Nolan Pratt to Tampa Bay in exchange for this pick.
14. Calgary's acquired fifth-round pick went to Detroit as the result of a trade on June 18, 1998 that sent a fifth-round pick (# 164 overall) and a seventh-round pick in the 2001 entry draft to Calgary in exchange for this pick.
15. Calgary's acquired seventh-round pick went to the Rangers as the result of a trade on June 24, 2001 that sent a seventh-round pick (# 207 overall) in the 2001 Entry Draft to Calgary in exchange for this pick.
16. Colorado's acquired ninth-round pick went to Nashville as the result of a trade on March 1, 2002 that sent a ninth-round pick in the D.J. Smith to Colorado in exchange for this pick.
17. Columbus' acquired first-round pick went to Atlanta as the result of a trade on June 22, 2002 that sent a second-round pick and a third-round pick in the 2002 Entry Draft to Columbus in exchange for this pick.
  Columbus previously acquired this pick as the result of a trade on June 22, 2002 that sent a first-round pick (# 20 overall) in the 2002 Entry Draft to Buffalo in exchange for the rights to Mike Pandolfo and this pick.
18. The conditions of the conditional pick are unknown and the pick was not exercised.

== July ==
July 1, 2001	To St. Louis Blues Doug Weight; Michel Riesen	To Edmonton Oilers Marty Reasoner; Jochen Hecht; Jan Horacek
July 2, 2001	To Phoenix Coyotes Daymond Langkow	To Philadelphia Flyers 2nd-rd pick - 2002 entry draft (SJS - # 52 - Dan Spang)^{1} 1st-rd pick - 2003 entry draft (# 11 - Jeff Carter)
July 2, 2001	To Mighty Ducks of Anaheim Denny Lambert; 9th-rd pick - 2002 entry draft (# 261 - Francois Caron)	To Atlanta Thrashers 8th-rd pick - 2002 entry draft (# 236 - Tyler Boldt)
July 9, 2001	To Carolina Hurricanes Aaron Ward	To Detroit Red Wings 2nd-rd pick - 2002 entry draft (# 58 - Jiri Hudler)
July 10, 2001	To Florida Panthers Ryan Johnson; 6th-rd pick - 2003 entry draft (TBL - # 192 - Doug O'Brien)^{2}	To Tampa Bay Lightning Vaclav Prospal
July 11, 2001	To Washington Capitals Jaromir Jagr; Frantisek Kucera	To Pittsburgh Penguins Kris Beech; Michal Sivek; Ross Lupaschuk; Future considerations
July 31, 2001	To Nashville Predators Andy Delmore	To Philadelphia Flyers 3rd-rd pick - 2002 entry draft (PHO - # 70 - Joe Callahan)^{3}

1. Tampa Bay's acquired second-round pick went to San Jose as the result of a trade on June 22, 2002 that sent a second-round pick (# 60 overall) and a fifth-round pick in the 2002 Entry Draft to Tampa Bay in exchange for this pick.
  Tampa Bay previously acquired this pick as the result of a trade on June 21, 2002 that sent a first-round pick in the 2002 Entry Draft to Philadelphia in exchange for Ruslan Fedotenko, a second-round pick (# 34 overall) in the 2002 Entry Draft and this pick.
2. Tampa Bay's sixth-round pick was re-acquired as the result of a trade on June 21, 2003 that sent a first-round pick in the 2003 Entry Draft to Florida in exchange for two second-round picks (# 34 & # 41 overall) in the 2003 Entry Draft and this pick.
3. Philadelphia's acquired third-round pick went to Phoenix as the result of a trade on June 12, 2002 that sent Robert Esche and Michal Handzus to Philadelphia in exchange for Brian Boucher and this pick.

== August ==
August 20, 2001	To New York Rangers Eric Lindros conditional 1st-rd pick - 2003 entry draft^{1}	To Philadelphia Flyers Pavel Brendl; Jan Hlavac; Kim Johnsson; 3rd-rd pick - 2003 entry draft (# 81 - Stefan Ruzicka)
August 22, 2001	To Washington Capitals Chris Ferraro	To New Jersey Devils Future considerations
August 29, 2001	To Columbus Blue Jackets Grant Marshall	To Dallas Stars 2nd-rd pick - 2003 entry draft (# 33 - Loui Eriksson)

1. The conditions of this pick was the Rangers would gain a 2003 first-round draft pick if Lindros sustained a concussion during the preseason or the first 50 regular season games and did not return for at least 12 months. The conditions were not met.

== September ==
September 28, 2001	To Columbus Blue Jackets rights to Evgeny Petrochinin	To Dallas Stars Kirk Muller
September 30, 2001	To Chicago Blackhawks rights to Shawn Thornton	To Toronto Maple Leafs Marty Wilford

== October ==
October 9, 2001	To Nashville Predators Nathan Perrott	To Chicago Blackhawks Future considerations
October 24, 2001	To Boston Bruins Jozef Stumpel; Glen Murray	To Los Angeles Kings Jason Allison; Mikko Eloranta

== November ==
November 1, 2001	To Mighty Ducks of Anaheim Sergei Krivokrasov	To Minnesota Wild 7th-rd pick - 2002 entry draft (# 204 - Niklas Eckerblom); Future considerations
November 1, 2001	To Mighty Ducks of Anaheim Patric Kjellberg	To Nashville Predators Petr Tenkrat
November 9, 2001	To New Jersey Devils Andrei Zyuzin	To Tampa Bay Lightning Josef Boumedienne; Sascha Goc rights to Anton But
November 10, 2001	To Vancouver Canucks Trevor Linden; 2nd-rd pick - 2002 entry draft (# 55 - Denis Grot)	To Washington Capitals 1st-rd pick - 2002 entry draft (# 17 - Boyd Gordon); 3rd-rd pick - 2003 entry draft (EDM - # 94 - Zach Stortini)^{1}
November 22, 2001	To Dallas Stars Martin Rucinsky; Benoit Brunet	To Montreal Canadiens Donald Audette; Shaun Van Allen
November 22, 2001	To Toronto Maple Leafs Jyrki Lumme	To Dallas Stars Dave Manson

1. Washington's acquired third-round pick went to Edmonton as the result of a trade on October 7, 2002 that sent Mike Grier to Washington in exchange for a second-round pick in the 2003 entry draft and this pick.

== December ==
December 4, 2001	To Mighty Ducks of Anaheim Bert Robertsson	To Nashville Predators Jay Legault
December 5, 2001	To St. Louis Blues Steve Halko; 4th-rd pick - 2002 entry draft (ATL - # 124 - Lane Manson)^{1}	To Carolina Hurricanes Sean Hill
December 12, 2001	To Tampa Bay Lightning Matthew Barnaby	To New York Rangers Zdeno Ciger
December 16, 2001	To Ottawa Senators Dean Melanson	To Washington Capitals Josef Boumedienne
December 17, 2001	To Vancouver Canucks Jan Hlavac; 3rd-rd pick - 2002 entry draft (# 68 - Brett Skinner)	To Philadelphia Flyers Donald Brashear; 6th-rd pick - 2002 entry draft (CBJ - # 184 - Jaroslav Balastik)^{2}
December 18, 2001	To Los Angeles Kings Rich Brennan	To Nashville Predators Brett Hauer
December 18, 2001	To Calgary Flames Petr Buzek; 6th-rd pick - 2004 entry draft (# 173 - Adam Pardy)	To Atlanta Thrashers Jeff Cowan rights to Kurtis Foster
December 28, 2001	To Carolina Hurricanes Kaspars Astašenko	To Tampa Bay Lightning Harlan Pratt
December 28, 2001	To Vancouver Canucks Trevor Letowski; Todd Warriner; Tyler Bouck; 3rd-rd pick - 2003 entry draft (PHO - # 80 - Dmitri Pestunov)^{3}	To Phoenix Coyotes Drake Berehowsky; Denis Pederson

1. St. Louis' acquired fourth-round pick went to Atlanta as the result of a trade on March 18, 2002 that sent Ray Ferraro to St. Louis in exchange for this pick.
2. Philadelphia's acquired sixth-round pick went to Columbus as the result of a trade on June 23, 2002 that sent a fifth-round pick in the 2003 entry draft to Philadelphia in exchange for a seventh-round pick in the 2002 Entry Draft and this pick.
3. Phoenix's third-round pick was re-acquired as the result of a trade on March 11, 2003 that sent Brad May to Vancouver in exchange for a conditional pick in the 2003 Entry Draft (this pick). Conditions of this draft pick are unknown.

== January ==
January 3, 2002	To Phoenix Coyotes Sebastien Bordeleau	To Minnesota Wild David Cullen
January 7, 2002	To Tampa Bay Lightning Dan Boyle	To Florida Panthers 5th-rd pick - 2003 entry draft (# 162 - Martin Tuma)
January 11, 2002	To Philadelphia Flyers Yves Sarault	To Nashville Predators Jason Beckett; Petr Hubacek
January 12, 2002	To Boston Bruins Benoit Hogue	To Dallas Stars Future considerations
January 14, 2002	To Mighty Ducks of Anaheim Dave Roche	To New York Islanders Jim Cummins
January 16, 2002	To New Jersey Devils Valeri Kamensky	To Dallas Stars Andre Lakos; Future considerations
January 16, 2002	To Florida Panthers Sandis Ozolinsh; Byron Ritchie	To Carolina Hurricanes Bret Hedican; Tomas Malec; Kevyn Adams
January 17, 2002	To Chicago Blackhawks Joe Reekie	To Washington Capitals 4th-rd pick - 2002 entry draft (# 118 - Petr Dvorak)
January 22, 2002	To Minnesota Wild Hnat Domenichelli	To Atlanta Thrashers Andy Sutton
January 24, 2002	To Colorado Avalanche Brett Clark	To Atlanta Thrashers Frederic Cassivi
January 25, 2002	To Phoenix Coyotes Andrei Nazarov	To Boston Bruins 5th-rd pick - 2002 entry draft (# 153 - Peter Hamerlik)
January 25, 2002	To Phoenix Coyotes Brian Savage; 3rd-rd pick - 2002 entry draft (# 80 - Matt Jones) or 2003 entry draft Future considerations	To Montreal Canadiens Sergei Berezin

== February ==
February 6, 2002	To Nashville Predators Steve Dubinsky	To Chicago Blackhawks Future considerations
February 11, 2002	To St. Louis Blues Shjon Podein	To Colorado Avalanche Mike Keane
February 13, 2002	To Carolina Hurricanes Jesse Boulerice	To Philadelphia Flyers Greg Koehler

== March 1–18 ==
March 1, 2002	To Toronto Maple Leafs Marc Moro	To Nashville Predators D. J. Smith; Marty Wilford
March 1, 2002	To Colorado Avalanche D. J. Smith	To Nashville Predators 9th-rd pick in 2002 entry draft (# 264 - Matthew Davis)
March 4, 2002	To New Jersey Devils Mike Rucinski	To Carolina Hurricanes Ted Drury
March 4, 2002	To Philadelphia Flyers Jarrod Skalde	To Atlanta Thrashers Joe DiPenta
March 4, 2002	To Carolina Hurricanes Kevin Weekes	To Tampa Bay Lightning Shane Willis; Chris Dingman
March 4, 2002	To Boston Bruins Marty McInnis	To Mighty Ducks of Anaheim 3rd-rd pick - 2002 entry draft (DET - # 95 - Valtteri Filppula)^{1}
March 8, 2002	To Pittsburgh Penguins Bert Robertsson	To Mighty Ducks of Anaheim Mark Moore
March 12, 2002	To New York Rangers Martin Rucinsky; Roman Lyashenko	To Dallas Stars Manny Malhotra; Barrett Heisten
March 13, 2002	To Chicago Blackhawks Tom Fitzgerald	To Nashville Predators 4th-rd pick - 2003 entry draft (ANA - # 119 - Nathan Saunders)^{2} Future considerations
March 15, 2002	To Ottawa Senators Juha Ylonen	To Tampa Bay Lightning Andre Roy; 6th-rd pick - 2002 entry draft (# 183 - Paul Ranger)
March 15, 2002	To Pittsburgh Penguins Jamie Pushor	To Columbus Blue Jackets 4th-rd pick - 2003 entry draft (# 103 - Kevin Jarman)
March 15, 2002	To Toronto Maple Leafs Tom Barrasso	To Carolina Hurricanes 4th-rd pick - 2003 entry draft (# 126 - Kevin Nastiuk)
March 15, 2002	To Atlanta Thrashers Francis Lessard	To Philadelphia Flyers David Harlock; 3rd-rd pick - 2003 entry draft (PHO - # 77 - Tyler Redenbach)^{3} 7th-rd pick - 2003 entry draft (SJS - # 205 - Joe Pavelski)^{4}
March 16, 2002	To Los Angeles Kings Cliff Ronning	To Nashville Predators Jere Karalahti conditional pick - 2003 entry draft (4th-rd - # 117 - Teemu Lassila)^{5}
March 16, 2002	To Ottawa Senators Benoit Brunet	To Dallas Stars 6th-rd pick - 2003 entry draft (# 196 - Elias Granath)
March 17, 2002	To Philadelphia Flyers Billy Tibbetts	To Pittsburgh Penguins Kent Manderville
March 17, 2002	To Nashville Predators Jukka Hentunen	To Calgary Flames conditional pick - 2003 entry draft^{6}
March 18, 2002	To New York Rangers Pavel Bure; 2nd-rd pick - 2002 entry draft (# 33 - Lee Falardeau)	To Florida Panthers Igor Ulanov; Filip Novak; 1st-rd pick - 2002 entry draft (CGY - # 10 - Eric Nystrom)^{7} 2nd-round pick - 2002 entry draft (# 40 - Rob Globke); 4th-rd pick - 2003 entry draft (ATL - # 116 - Guillaume Desbiens)^{8}
March 18, 2002	To St. Louis Blues Ray Ferraro	To Atlanta Thrashers 4th-rd pick - 2002 entry draft (# 124 - Lane Manson)

1. Nashville's third-round pick went to Detroit as the result of a trade on June 22, 2002 that sent a third-round pick in the 2003 entry draft to Nashville in exchange for this pick.·
  Nashville previously acquired this pick as the result of a trade on June 22, 2002 that sent future considerations (Nashville agreed not to select Joffrey Lupul in 2002 entry draft) to Anaheim in exchange for this pick.
2. Nashville's acquired third-round pick went to Anaheim as the result of a trade on June 23, 2003 that sent a fourth-round pick and fifth-round pick in the 2004 entry draft to Nashville in exchange for this pick.
3. Philadelphia's acquired third-round pick went to Phoenix as the result of a trade on March 10, 2003 that sent Tony Amonte to Philadelphia in exchange for Guillaume Lefebvre a second-round pick in the 2004 entry draft and this pick.
4. Philadelphia's acquired seventh-round pick went to San Jose as the result of a trade on June 22, 2003 that sent a sixth-round pick in the 2004 entry draft to Philadelphia in exchange for this pick.
5. The conditions of this draft pick are unknown.
6. The conditions of this draft pick are unknown.
7. Florida's acquired first-round pick went to Calgary as the result of a trade on June 22, 2002 that sent a first-round pick (# 9 overall) in the 2002 entry draft to Florida in exchange for a fourth-round pick in the 2002 entry draft and this pick.
8. Florida's acquired first-round pick went to Atlanta as the result of a trade on June 22, 2002 that sent future considerations (Atlanta's promise not to draft Jay Bouwmeester #2 overall in 2002 entry draft) to Florida in exchange for a third-round pick in the 2002 entry draft and this pick.

== March 19 - trade deadline ==
March 19, 2002	To Mighty Ducks of Anaheim Ben Guite rights to Bjorn Melin	To New York Islanders Dave Roche
March 19, 2002	To Detroit Red Wings Jiri Slegr	To Atlanta Thrashers Yuri Butsayev; 3rd-rd pick - 2002 entry draft (CBJ - # 96 - Jeff Genovy)^{1}
March 19, 2002	To Phoenix Coyotes Darcy Hordichuk; 4th-rd pick - 2002 entry draft (# 97 - Lance Monych); 5th-rd pick - 2002 entry draft (# 132 - John Zeiler)	To Atlanta Thrashers Kirill Safronov rights to Ruslan Zainullin; 4th-rd pick - 2002 entry draft (# 116 - Patrick Dwyer)
March 19, 2002	To Buffalo Sabres Bob Corkum	To Atlanta Thrashers 5th-rd pick - 2002 entry draft (# 144 - Paul Flache)
March 19, 2002	To Minnesota Wild Greg Crozier	To Boston Bruins Darryl Laplante
March 19, 2002	To Edmonton Oilers Bobby Allen	To Boston Bruins Sean Brown
March 19, 2002	To Columbus Blue Jackets Jaroslav Specek; 2nd-rd pick - 2003 entry draft (# 46 - Dan Fritsche)	To Chicago Blackhawks Lyle Odelein
March 19, 2002	To Calgary Flames Blake Sloan	To Columbus Blue Jackets Jamie Allison
March 19, 2002	To Colorado Avalanche Darius Kasparaitis	To Pittsburgh Penguins Rick Berry; Ville Nieminen
March 19, 2002	To New Jersey Devils Joe Nieuwendyk; Jamie Langenbrunner	To Dallas Stars Jason Arnott; Randy McKay; 1st-round pick in 2002 entry draft (BUF - # 20 - Daniel Paille)^{2}
March 19, 2002	To New York Rangers Tom Poti; Rem Murray	To Edmonton Oilers Mike York; 4th-rd pick - 2002 entry draft (# 106 - Ivan Koltsov)
March 19, 2002	To New York Islanders Darren Van Impe	To Florida Panthers 5th-rd pick - 2003 entry draft (LAK - # 152 - Brady Murray)^{3}
March 19, 2002	To Boston Bruins Jeff Norton	To Florida Panthers 6th-rd pick - 2002 entry draft (# 196 - Mikael Vuorio)
March 19, 2002	To Montreal Canadiens Stephane Fiset	To Los Angeles Kings future considerations
March 19, 2002	To New York Rangers Richard Lintner	To Nashville Predators Peter Smrek
March 19, 2002	To New Jersey Devils Stephane Richer	To Pittsburgh Penguins 7th-rd pick in 2003 entry draft (# 229 - Stephen Dixon)
March 19, 2002	To Philadelphia Flyers Adam Oates	To Washington Capitals Maxime Ouellet; 1st-rd pick - 2002 entry draft (DAL - # 26 - Martin Vagner)^{4} 2nd-rd pick - 2002 entry draft (# 59 - Maxime Daigneault); 3rd-rd pick - 2002 entry draft (# 92 - Derek Krestanovich)

1. Atlanta's acquired third-round pick went to Columbus as the result of a trade on June 22, 2002 that sent a first-round pick in the 2002 entry draft to Atlanta in exchange for a second-round pick in the 2002 entry draft and this pick.
2. Columbus' acquired first-round pick went to Buffalo as the result of a trade on June 22, 2002 that sent the rights to Mike Pandolfo and a first-round pick (# 30 overall) in the 2002 entry draft to Columbus in exchange for this pick.
  Columbus previously acquired this pick as the result of a trade on June 18, 2002 that sent Ron Tugnutt and a second-round pick in the 2002 entry draft to Dallas in exchange for this pick.
3. Florida's acquired fifth-round pick went to Los Angeles as the result of a trade on November 26, 2002 that sent Jaroslav Bednar and Andreas Lilja to Florida in exchange for Dmitry Yushkevich and this pick.
4. Washington's acquired first-round pick went to Dallas as the result of a trade on June 12, 2002 that sent a first-round pick (# 13 overall) in the 2002 entry draft to Washington in exchange for a second-round pick and a sixth-round pick in the 2002 entry draft along with this pick.
