= 2001–02 NHL season =

National Hockey League season

- League: National Hockey League
- Sport: Ice hockey
- Duration: October 3, 2001 – June 13, 2002
- Games: 82
- Teams: 30
- TV partner(s): CBC, Sportsnet, SRC (Canada); ESPN, ABC (United States)

Draft
- Top draft pick: Ilya Kovalchuk
- Picked by: Atlanta Thrashers

Regular season
- Presidents' Trophy: Detroit Red Wings
- Season MVP: Jose Theodore (Canadiens)
- Top scorer: Jarome Iginla (Flames)

Playoffs
- Playoffs MVP: Nicklas Lidstrom (Red Wings)

Stanley Cup
- Champions: Detroit Red Wings
- Runners-up: Carolina Hurricanes

NHL seasons
- 2000–01 2002–03

The 2001–02 NHL season was the 85th regular season of the National Hockey League. Thirty teams competed in an 82-game regular season. The regular season began on October 3, and the playoffs concluded on June 13, with the Detroit Red Wings defeating the Carolina Hurricanes in the Stanley Cup Finals in five games, winning their tenth Stanley Cup in franchise history.

== League business ==
=== Pittsburgh financial troubles ===
The cash-strapped Pittsburgh Penguins, desperate to dump payroll, could no longer afford perennial superstar Jaromir Jagr. He would be traded, along with Frantisek Kucera, to the Washington Capitals in exchange for Kris Beech, Ross Lupaschuk, Michal Sivek, and $4.9 million. Despite Mario Lemieux's return the previous season, the absence of Jagr proved devastating to the Penguins, and they missed the playoffs for the first time since 1990. The Penguins did not return to the playoffs until 2007 after they drafted Sidney Crosby 2 years prior.

=== Entry draft ===
The 2001 NHL entry draft was held on June 23 and 24, 2001 at the National Car Rental Center in Sunrise, Florida. Ilya Kovalchuk was selected first overall by the Atlanta Thrashers.

=== Preseason game in Europe ===
As part of the NHL Challenge, the Colorado Avalanche played a preseason game against Swedish team Brynäs Gävle on September 16, 2001 at Stockholm Globe Arena in Stockholm.

== Remembrances of September 11, 2001, attacks ==
The 2001–02 regular season began less than one month after the September 11 attacks. The NHL honored the victims by having all players wear a patch on their jerseys, and a ribbon sticker on the back of their helmet. Red, white, and blue ribbons were painted on the ice behind each net at American arenas, and red and white ribbons were painted behind the nets at Canadian arenas. On September 20, 2001, in the middle of a pre-season game between the Philadelphia Flyers and New York Rangers with both teams tied up 2–2, nine days after the attacks, the game was stopped so that a national television address by U.S. President George W. Bush about the September 11 attacks could be broadcast on the arena video screen. After the end of the television address, the game did not resume and was declared a 2–2 tie.

== Uniform changes ==
- Buffalo Sabres: In the wake of the September 11 attacks, the Sabres, in a sign of solidarity, took to the ice at Madison Square Garden on October 7 wearing jerseys reading "New York" on the front. Like the New York Rangers, their opponents in that game, the Sabres, play their home games in the state of New York.
- Colorado Avalanche: The Avalanche introduce a third jersey, with a burgundy base and the word "Colorado" slanted across the front of the jersey.
- Columbus Blue Jackets: The numbers become more narrow and the names on the back shrink slightly.
- Edmonton Oilers: The team introduces an alternate jersey, featuring silver in place of bronze and red. The crest is their new alternate logo with an oil bolt with 5 rivets, representing the team's 5 Stanley Cup titles.
- Los Angeles Kings: The Kings wore two patches. On the upper right chest was the All-Star Game patch, as the Kings were the hosts of the 2002 All-Star Game. On the upper left chest is a patch with the letters "AM," for director of scouting Garnet "Ace" Bailey and scout Mark Bavis, who were killed aboard United Airlines Flight 175 in the September 11 attacks.
- Nashville Predators: The Predators unveil their first alternate jersey in team history, with the base a mustard yellow compared to their usual shade of gold used in the trimmings of their home and away jerseys. It also uses the team's front-facing sabre-tooth tiger head logo.
- New York Rangers: In the wake of the September 11 attacks, the Rangers wore ribbons on their uniforms in memory of the victims. Also in their October 7 game at Madison Square Garden against the Buffalo Sabres, both teams wore "New York" on their jerseys. For the Rangers, it was a return of sorts to the blue jerseys they wore from 1978 to 1987.
- Ottawa Senators: The Senators wore special stickers on their helmets marking their 10th season in the NHL.
- Philadelphia Flyers: The orange jersey is retired, leaving the black jersey to be worn on the road full time. However, they did wear the orange jersey once on Halloween night. The jerseys brought good luck to the Flyers that night, as they shut out the Pittsburgh Penguins, 3–0. In a show of support for New York's finest and bravest, the Flyers wore three special patches at the bottom of the back of the jersey. From left to right, they were "FDNY," the American flag, and "NYPD." The jerseys were auctioned off after the game to benefit the NHL's Twin Towers fund.
- San Jose Sharks: The Sharks introduce a new black alternate jersey, with minimal striping compared to their home and away jerseys and downplaying the use of teal.
- Tampa Bay Lightning: The team changes the font of their jerseys due to fan complaints deeming them unreadable. Also, the Lightning wore a patch to celebrate their 10th NHL season.
- Toronto Maple Leafs: In honor of the 75th anniversary of the St. Pats becoming the Maple Leafs, the team wears vintage St. Pats jerseys in their game against the Buffalo Sabres on March 2. During the rest of the season, they wore special stickers on their helmets celebrating the 75th anniversary of the Maple Leafs.
- Vancouver Canucks: A new alternate jersey is introduced, featuring a torso that changes from navy blue to maroon. The jersey features a redesigned Canuck Place patch.
- Washington Capitals: The Capitals wore a patch in memory of the victims of the September 11 attacks.

== Arena changes ==
- The Dallas Stars moved from Reunion Arena to the American Airlines Center, with American Airlines acquiring the naming rights.
- The San Jose Sharks' home arena, San Jose Arena, was renamed the Compaq Center as part of new naming rights agreement with Compaq.

== Regular season ==
=== All-Star Game ===
The All-Star Game was played on February 2, 2002, at the Staples Center in Los Angeles, the home of the Los Angeles Kings. It was the last NHL All-Star Game to have the North America vs. World All-Star format.

=== Olympics ===
The league took a break from its season between February 14 and February 25 to allow players to participate at the men's ice hockey tournament at the 2002 Winter Olympics in Salt Lake City.

=== Death of Brittanie Cecil ===
During the Calgary Flames–Columbus Blue Jackets game on March 16 at Nationwide Arena, 13-year old fan Brittanie Cecil was struck in head by a deflected puck. She died from her injuries two days later. As a result of the tragedy, the NHL made it mandatory the following season to install protective nets above the glass behind both goals.

=== Scoring ===
For the second time in three seasons, no player reached the 100-point plateau. In addition, for the first time since 1980, the Art Ross Trophy was not won by either Wayne Gretzky, Mario Lemieux, or Jaromir Jagr. Instead, the award went to Jarome Iginla, who scored 96 points.

== Standings ==
The Detroit Red Wings placed first in the league standings and received home-ice advantage throughout the playoffs. This is the first season that the Calgary Flames and Edmonton Oilers both missed the playoffs.

Note: W = Wins, L = Losses, T = Ties, OTL = Overtime Losses, GF= Goals For, GA = Goals Against, Pts = Points

=== Eastern Conference ===
Atlantic Division
No.	CR		GP	W	L	T	OTL	GF	GA	Pts
1	2	**Philadelphia Flyers**	82	42	27	10	3	234	192	97
2	5	**New York Islanders**	82	42	28	8	4	239	220	96
3	6	**New Jersey Devils**	82	41	28	9	4	205	187	95
4	11	New York Rangers	82	36	38	4	4	227	258	80
5	12	Pittsburgh Penguins	82	28	41	8	5	198	249	69

Northeast Division
No.	CR		GP	W	L	T	OTL	GF	GA	Pts
1	1	**Boston Bruins**	82	43	24	6	9	236	201	101
2	4	**Toronto Maple Leafs**	82	43	25	10	4	249	207	100
3	7	**Ottawa Senators**	82	39	27	9	7	243	208	94
4	8	**Montreal Canadiens**	82	36	31	12	3	207	209	87
5	10	Buffalo Sabres	82	35	35	11	1	213	200	82

Southeast Division
No.	CR		GP	W	L	T	OTL	GF	GA	Pts
1	3	**Carolina Hurricanes**	82	35	26	16	5	217	217	91
2	9	Washington Capitals	82	36	33	11	2	228	240	85
3	13	Tampa Bay Lightning	82	27	40	11	4	178	219	69
4	14	Florida Panthers	82	22	44	10	6	180	250	60
5	15	Atlanta Thrashers	82	19	47	11	5	187	288	54

Teams in bold qualified for the playoffs.

Eastern Conference
R		Div	GP	W	L	T	OTL	GF	GA	Pts
**1**	**Z-** Boston Bruins	**NE**	**82**	**43**	**24**	**6**	**9**	**236**	**201**	101
**2**	**Y-** Philadelphia Flyers	**AT**	**82**	**42**	**27**	**10**	**3**	**234**	**192**	97
**3**	**Y-** Carolina Hurricanes	**SE**	**82**	**35**	**26**	**16**	**5**	**217**	**217**	91
**4**	**X-** Toronto Maple Leafs	**NE**	**82**	**43**	**25**	**10**	**4**	**249**	**207**	100
**5**	**X-** New York Islanders	**AT**	**82**	**42**	**28**	**8**	**4**	**239**	**220**	96
**6**	**X-** New Jersey Devils	**AT**	**82**	**41**	**28**	**9**	**4**	**205**	**187**	95
**7**	**X-** Ottawa Senators	**NE**	**82**	**39**	**27**	**9**	**7**	**243**	**208**	94
**8**	**X-** Montreal Canadiens	**NE**	**82**	**36**	**31**	**12**	**3**	**207**	**209**	87
8.5
9	Washington Capitals	SE	82	36	33	11	2	228	240	85
10	Buffalo Sabres	NE	82	35	35	11	1	213	200	82
11	New York Rangers	AT	82	36	38	4	4	227	258	80
12	Pittsburgh Penguins	AT	82	28	41	8	5	198	249	69
13	Tampa Bay Lightning	SE	82	27	40	11	4	178	219	69
14	Florida Panthers	SE	82	22	44	10	6	180	250	60
15	Atlanta Thrashers	SE	82	19	47	11	5	187	288	54

Divisions: AT – Atlantic, NE – Northeast, SE – Southeast

Z – Clinched conference; Y – Clinched division; X – Clinched playoff spot

=== Western Conference ===
Central Division
No.	CR		GP	W	L	T	OTL	GF	GA	Pts
1	1	**Detroit Red Wings**	82	51	17	10	4	251	187	116
2	4	**St. Louis Blues**	82	43	27	8	4	227	188	98
3	5	**Chicago Blackhawks**	82	41	27	13	1	216	207	96
4	14	Nashville Predators	82	28	41	13	0	196	230	69
5	15	Columbus Blue Jackets	82	22	47	8	5	164	255	57

Northwest Division
No.	CR		GP	W	L	T	OTL	GF	GA	Pts
1	2	**Colorado Avalanche**	82	45	28	8	1	212	169	99
2	8	**Vancouver Canucks**	82	42	30	7	3	254	211	94
3	9	Edmonton Oilers	82	38	28	12	4	205	182	92
4	11	Calgary Flames	82	32	35	12	3	201	220	79
5	12	Minnesota Wild	82	26	35	12	9	195	238	73

Pacific Division
No.	CR		GP	W	L	T	OTL	GF	GA	Pts
1	3	**San Jose Sharks**	82	44	27	8	3	248	189	99
2	6	**Phoenix Coyotes**	82	40	27	9	6	228	210	95
3	7	**Los Angeles Kings**	82	40	27	11	4	214	190	95
4	10	Dallas Stars	82	36	28	13	5	215	213	90
5	13	Mighty Ducks of Anaheim	82	29	42	8	3	175	198	69

Teams in bold qualified for the playoffs.

Western Conference
R		Div	GP	W	L	T	OTL	GF	GA	Pts
**1**	**p – Detroit Red Wings**	**CEN**	**82**	**51**	**17**	**10**	**4**	**251**	**187**	**116**
**2**	**y – Colorado Avalanche**	**NW**	**82**	**45**	**28**	**8**	**1**	**212**	**169**	**99**
**3**	**y – San Jose Sharks**	**PAC**	**82**	**44**	**27**	**8**	**3**	**248**	**199**	**99**
**4**	**St. Louis Blues**	**CEN**	**82**	**43**	**27**	**8**	**4**	**227**	**188**	**98**
**5**	**Chicago Blackhawks**	**CEN**	**82**	**41**	**27**	**13**	**1**	**216**	**207**	**96**
**6**	**Phoenix Coyotes**	**PAC**	**82**	**40**	**27**	**9**	**6**	**228**	**210**	**95**
**7**	**Los Angeles Kings**	**PAC**	**82**	**40**	**27**	**11**	**4**	**214**	**190**	**95**
**8**	**Vancouver Canucks**	**NW**	**82**	**42**	**30**	**7**	**3**	**254**	**211**	**94**
8.5
9	Edmonton Oilers	NW	82	38	28	12	4	205	182	92
10	Dallas Stars	PAC	82	36	28	13	5	215	213	90
11	Calgary Flames	NW	82	32	35	12	3	201	220	79
12	Minnesota Wild	NW	82	26	35	12	9	195	238	73
13	Mighty Ducks of Anaheim	PAC	82	29	42	8	3	175	198	69
14	Nashville Predators	CEN	82	28	41	13	0	196	230	69
15	Columbus Blue Jackets	CEN	82	22	47	8	5	164	255	57

Divisions: CEN – Central, PAC – Pacific, NW – Northwest

bold – Qualified for playoffs; p – Won Presidents' Trophy; y – Won division

== Playoffs ==
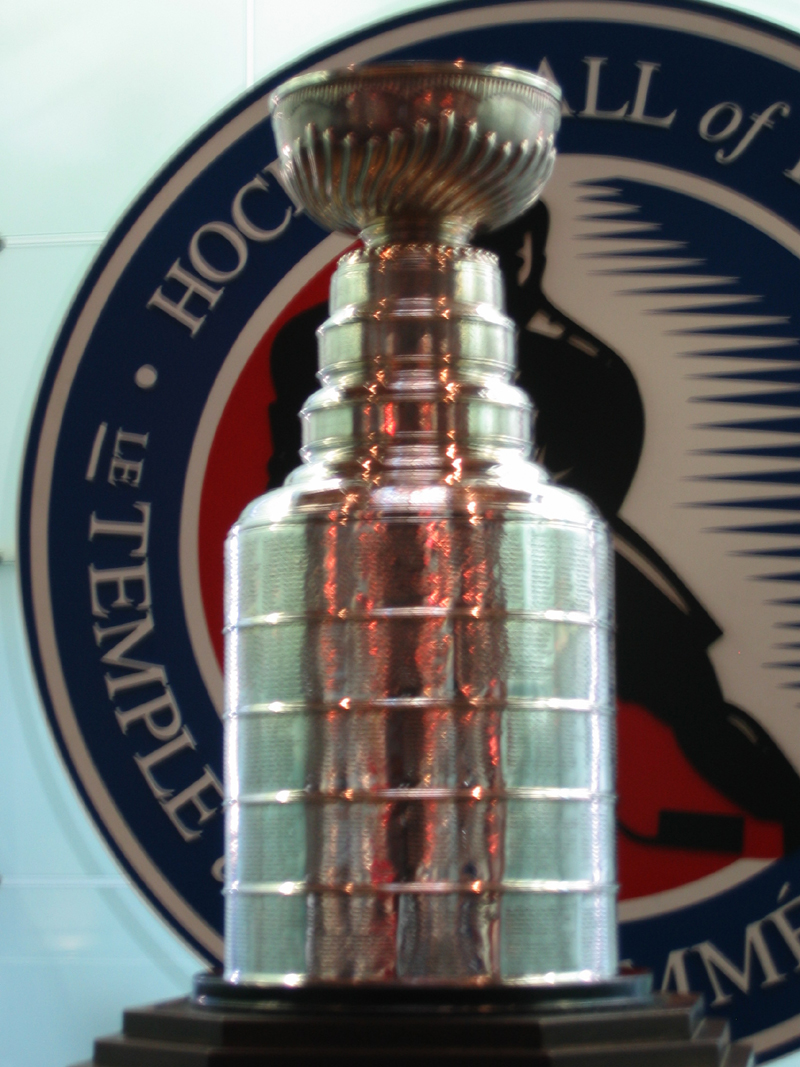
The Stanley Cup

=== Bracket ===
In each round, teams competed in a best-of-seven series following a 2–2–1–1–1 format (scores in the bracket indicate the number of games won in each best-of-seven series). The team with home ice advantage played at home for games one and two (and games five and seven, if necessary), and the other team played at home for games three and four (and game six, if necessary). The top eight teams in each conference made the playoffs, with the three division winners seeded 1–3 based on regular season record, and the five remaining teams seeded 4–8.

The NHL used "re-seeding" instead of a fixed bracket playoff system. During the first three rounds, the highest remaining seed in each conference was matched against the lowest remaining seed, the second-highest remaining seed played the second-lowest remaining seed, and so forth. The higher-seeded team was awarded home ice advantage. The two conference winners then advanced to the Stanley Cup Finals, where home ice advantage was awarded to the team that had the better regular season record.

Conference quarterfinals	Conference semifinals
1	Boston	2
8	Montreal	4
3	Carolina	4
8	Montreal	2
2	Philadelphia	1
7	Ottawa	4
Eastern Conference
3	Carolina	4
6	New Jersey	2
4	Toronto	4
7	Ottawa	3
4	Toronto	4
5	NY Islanders	3
1	Detroit	4
8	Vancouver	2
1	Detroit	4
4	St. Louis	1
2	Colorado	4
7	Los Angeles	3
Western Conference
3	San Jose	4
6	Phoenix	1
2	Colorado	4
3	San Jose	3
4	St. Louis	4
5	Chicago	1

Conference finals
3	Carolina	4
4	Toronto	2
1	Detroit	4
2	Colorado	3

Stanley Cup Finals
E3	Carolina	1
W1	Detroit	4

== Awards ==
The NHL Awards presentation took place in Toronto.

Presidents' Trophy:	Detroit Red Wings
Prince of Wales Trophy: (Eastern Conference playoff champion)	Carolina Hurricanes
Clarence S. Campbell Bowl: (Western Conference playoff champion)	Detroit Red Wings
Art Ross Trophy:	Jarome Iginla, Calgary Flames
Bill Masterton Memorial Trophy:	Saku Koivu, Montreal Canadiens
Calder Memorial Trophy:	Dany Heatley, Atlanta Thrashers
Conn Smythe Trophy:	Nicklas Lidstrom, Detroit Red Wings
Frank J. Selke Trophy:	Michael Peca, New York Islanders
Hart Memorial Trophy:	Jose Theodore, Montreal Canadiens
Jack Adams Award:	Bob Francis, Phoenix Coyotes
James Norris Memorial Trophy:	Nicklas Lidstrom, Detroit Red Wings
King Clancy Memorial Trophy:	Ron Francis, Carolina Hurricanes
Lady Byng Memorial Trophy:	Ron Francis, Carolina Hurricanes
Lester B. Pearson Award:	Jarome Iginla, Calgary Flames
Maurice 'Rocket' Richard Trophy:	Jarome Iginla, Calgary Flames
NHL Foundation Player Award:	Ron Francis, Carolina Hurricanes
NHL Plus-Minus Award:	Chris Chelios, Detroit Red Wings
Roger Crozier Saving Grace Award:	Jose Theodore, Montreal Canadiens
Vezina Trophy:	Jose Theodore, Montreal Canadiens
William M. Jennings Trophy:	Patrick Roy, Colorado Avalanche

=== All-Star teams ===
First team	Position	Second team	Position	All-Rookie First Team
Patrick Roy, Colorado Avalanche	G	Jose Theodore, Montreal Canadiens	G	Dan Blackburn, New York Rangers
Chris Chelios, Detroit Red Wings	D	Rob Blake, Colorado Avalanche	D	Nick Boynton, Boston Bruins
Nicklas Lidstrom, Detroit Red Wings	D	Sergei Gonchar, Washington Capitals	D	Rostislav Klesla, Columbus Blue Jackets
Joe Sakic, Colorado Avalanche	C	Mats Sundin, Toronto Maple Leafs	C	Dany Heatley, Atlanta Thrashers
Jarome Iginla, Calgary Flames	RW	Bill Guerin, Boston Bruins	RW	Ilya Kovalchuk, Atlanta Thrashers
Markus Naslund, Vancouver Canucks	LW	Brendan Shanahan, Detroit Red Wings	LW	Kristian Huselius, Florida Panthers

== Player statistics ==
=== Scoring leaders ===
Note: GP = Games Played, G = Goals, A = Assists, Pts = Points

Player	Team	GP	G	A	Pts
Jarome Iginla	Calgary	82	52	44	96
Markus Naslund	Vancouver	81	40	50	90
Todd Bertuzzi	Vancouver	72	36	49	85
Mats Sundin	Toronto	82	41	39	80
Jaromir Jagr	Washington	69	31	48	79
Joe Sakic	Colorado	82	26	53	79
Pavol Demitra	St. Louis	82	35	43	78
Adam Oates	Washington/ Philadelphia	80	14	64	78
Mike Modano	Dallas	78	34	43	77
Ron Francis	Carolina	80	27	50	77

=== Leading goaltenders ===
Note: GP = Games played; Min = Minutes Played; GA = Goals against; GAA = Goals against average; W = Wins; L = Losses; T = Ties; SO = Shutouts; SV% = Save percentage

Player	Team	GP	MIN	GA	GAA	W	L	T	SO	SV%
Patrick Roy	Colorado Avalanche	63	3773	122	1.94	32	23	8	9	.925
Roman Cechmanek	Philadelphia Flyers	46	2603	89	2.05	24	13	6	4	.921
Marty Turco	Dallas Stars	31	1519	53	2.09	15	6	2	2	.921
Jose Theodore	Montreal Canadiens	67	3864	136	2.11	30	24	10	7	.931
Jean-Sebastien Giguere	Mighty Ducks of Anaheim	53	3127	111	2.13	20	25	6	4	.920
Martin Brodeur	New Jersey Devils	73	4347	156	2.15	38	26	9	4	.906
Dominik Hasek	Detroit Red Wings	65	3872	140	2.17	41	15	8	5	.915
Brent Johnson	St. Louis Blues	58	3491	127	2.18	34	20	4	5	.902
Byron Dafoe	Boston Bruins	64	3827	141	2.21	35	26	3	4	.907
Martin Biron	Buffalo Sabres	72	4085	151	2.22	31	28	10	4	.915

Source: 2003 NHL Yearbook

== Coaches ==
=== Eastern Conference ===
- Atlanta Thrashers: Curt Fraser
- Boston Bruins: Robbie Ftorek
- Buffalo Sabres: Lindy Ruff
- Carolina Hurricanes: Paul Maurice
- Florida Panthers: Duane Sutter and Mike Keenan
- Montreal Canadiens: Michel Therrien
- New Jersey Devils: Larry Robinson and Kevin Constantine
- New York Islanders: Peter Laviolette
- New York Rangers: Ron Low
- Ottawa Senators: Jacques Martin
- Philadelphia Flyers: Bill Barber
- Pittsburgh Penguins: Ivan Hlinka and Rick Kehoe
- Tampa Bay Lightning: John Tortorella
- Toronto Maple Leafs: Pat Quinn
- Washington Capitals: Ron Wilson

=== Western Conference ===
- Mighty Ducks of Anaheim: Brian Murray
- Calgary Flames: Greg Gilbert
- Chicago Blackhawks: Brian Sutter
- Colorado Avalanche: Bob Hartley
- Columbus Blue Jackets: Dave King
- Dallas Stars: Ken Hitchcock and Rick Wilson
- Detroit Red Wings: Scotty Bowman
- Edmonton Oilers: Craig MacTavish
- Los Angeles Kings: Andy Murray
- Minnesota Wild: Jacques Lemaire
- Nashville Predators: Barry Trotz
- Phoenix Coyotes: Bobby Francis
- San Jose Sharks: Darryl Sutter
- St. Louis Blues: Joel Quenneville
- Vancouver Canucks: Marc Crawford

== Milestones ==
=== Debuts ===
The following is a list of players of note who played their first NHL game in 2001–02 (listed with their first team, asterisk(*) marks debut in playoffs):

- Ilya Bryzgalov, Mighty Ducks of Anaheim
- Dany Heatley, Atlanta Thrashers
- Ilya Kovalchuk, Atlanta Thrashers
- Ales Kotalik, Buffalo Sabres
- Henrik Tallinder, Buffalo Sabres
- Erik Cole, Carolina Hurricanes
- Tyler Arnason, Chicago Blackhawks
- Radim Vrbata, Colorado Avalanche
- Pavel Datsyuk, Detroit Red Wings
- Sean Avery, Detroit Red Wings
- Kristian Huselius, Florida Panthers
- Stephen Weiss, Florida Panthers
- Nick Schultz, Minnesota Wild
- Martin Erat, Nashville Predators
- Brian Gionta, New Jersey Devils
- Raffi Torres, New York Islanders
- Trent Hunter*, New York Islanders
- Chris Neil, Ottawa Senators
- Vesa Toskala, San Jose Sharks
- Barret Jackman, St. Louis Blues
- Alex Auld, Vancouver Canucks

=== Last games ===
The following is a list of players of note that played their last game in the NHL in 2001–02 (listed with their last team):

- Steve Duchesne, Detroit Red Wings
- Ray Ferraro, St. Louis Blues
- Grant Ledyard, Tampa Bay Lightning
- John MacLean, Dallas Stars
- Dave Manson, Dallas Stars
- Stephane Richer, New Jersey Devils
- Kevin Stevens, Pittsburgh Penguins
- Gary Suter, San Jose Sharks
- Rick Tocchet, Philadelphia Flyers
- John Vanbiesbrouck, New Jersey Devils
- Pat Verbeek, Dallas Stars
- Mike Vernon, Calgary Flames

== Broadcasting ==
=== Canada ===
This was the fourth and final season of the league's Canadian national broadcast rights deals with CBC and Sportsnet. CBC aired Saturday night Hockey Night in Canada regular season games, while Sportsnet's telecasts included Tuesday Night Hockey and other weeknight games. Coverage of the Stanley Cup playoffs continued to primarily be on CBC, while Sportsnet aired first round all-U.S. series.

The league would then sign a multi-year deal with Sportsnet's rival TSN.

=== United States ===
This was the third year of the league's five-year U.S. national broadcast rights deal with ESPN and ABC. ESPN and ESPN2 aired weeknight games throughout the regular season. ABC's coverage included the All-Star Game and five weeks worth of regional games on Saturday afternoons in January and March. During the first two rounds of the playoffs, ESPN and ESPN2 aired selected games, while ABC had Saturday regional telecasts. Each U.S. team's regional broadcaster produced local coverage of first and second round games (except for those games on ABC). ABC's weekend telecasts continued into the Conference Finals, while ESPN had the rest of the third round games. ESPN then aired the first two games of the Stanley Cup Finals before the rest of the series shifted to ABC.

== See also ==
- List of Stanley Cup champions
- 2001 NHL entry draft
- 2001-02 NHL transactions
- 52nd National Hockey League All-Star Game
- NHL All-Star Game
- NHL All-Rookie Team
- Lester Patrick Trophy
- Ice hockey at the 2002 Winter Olympics
- 2001 in sports
- 2002 in sports
