= Ross Lupaschuk =

Canadian ice hockey defenceman (born 1981)

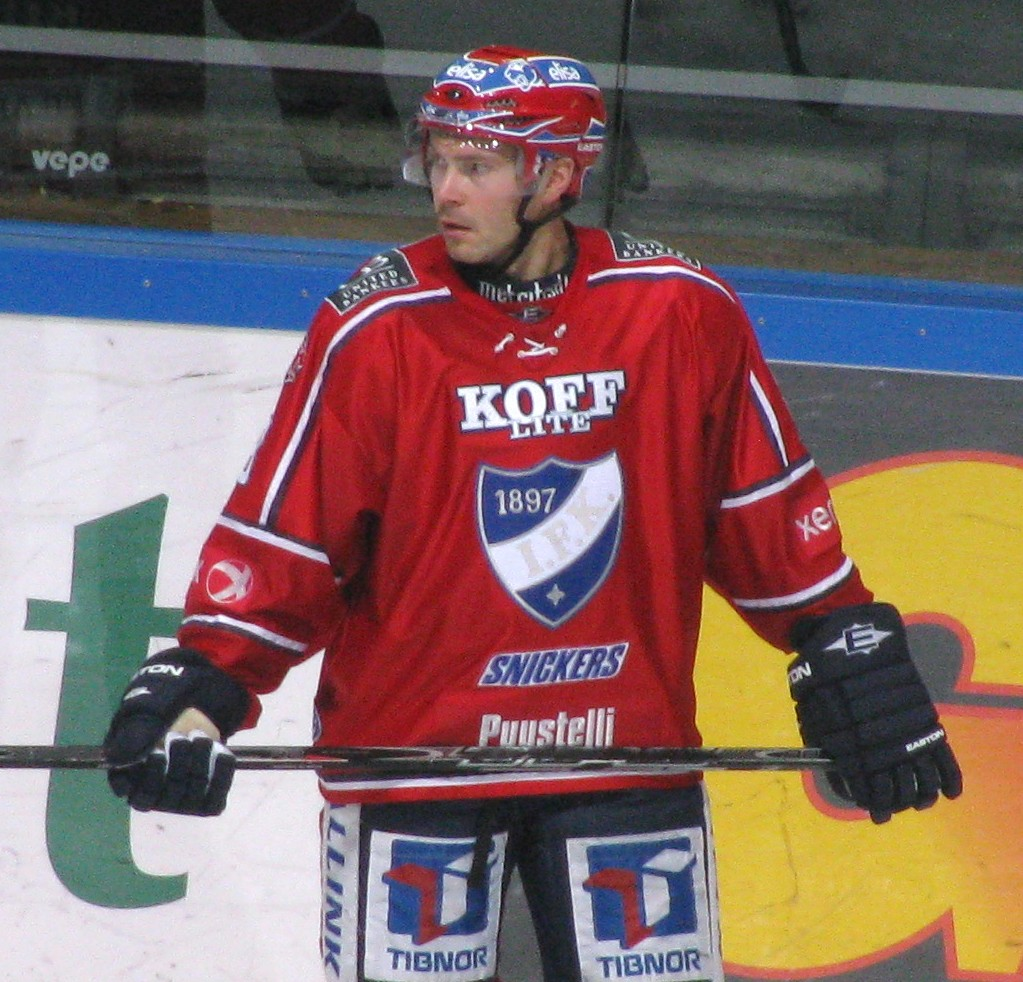
- Luaschuk in 2009
- Born: January 19, 1981 (age 45) Edmonton, Alberta, Canada
- Height: 6 ft 1 in (185 cm)
- Weight: 218 lb (99 kg; 15 st 8 lb)
- Position: Defence
- Shot: Right
- Played for: EC Salzburg; Jokerit; Vienna Capitals; Kölner Haie; HIFK; Mora IK; Sibir Novosibirsk; Avangard Omsk; Kärpät; Malmö IF; Pittsburgh Penguins
- NHL draft: 34th overall, 1999; Washington Capitals
- Playing career: 2001–2013

Ross Lupaschuk (born January 19, 1981) is a Canadian former ice hockey defenceman. He played 3 games in the National Hockey League (NHL) with the Pittsburgh Penguins during the 2002–03 season. The rest of his career, which lasted from 2001 to 2013, was mainly spent in European leagues.

== Juniors ==
Lupaschuk played his junior-level hockey in the Western Hockey League (WHL) for five seasons with the Lethbridge Hurricanes, Prince Albert Raiders and Red Deer Rebels. He was traded from the Raiders to the Rebels in 2001 in time to play for the Rebels during their 2001 Memorial Cup win. While with the Raiders, he was selected in the 1999 NHL entry draft by the Washington Capitals in the second round, 34th overall. Before turning professional, his playing rights were traded to the Pittsburgh Penguins.

== NHL and AHL ==
Lupaschuk played four seasons in the Penguins organization, primarily for the Wilkes-Barre/Scranton Penguins of the American Hockey League, except for three games with the Pittsburgh Penguins in 2002–03. He attended Phoenix Coyotes training camp at the start of the 2009–10 season, but was released on September 20, 2009.

== Europe and Russia ==
As a restricted free agent in 2005, Lupaschuk elected not to re-sign with the Penguins for the upcoming season and instead opted for Mora IK, in Sweden. The following year he played for Malmö Redhawks, also in Sweden, but left the team during the season for Kärpät, in Finland. In 2007, he transferred to Avangard Omsk Oblast of the Russian league. In 2008, he joined the HC Sibir Novosibirsk of the Kontinental Hockey League after a tryout with the Anaheim Ducks, played there until 19 January 2009 and signed on 22 January 2009 by Mora IK.

On November 3, 2009, Lupaschuk signed a contract to play with HIFK for the remainder of the season.

== Career statistics ==
=== Regular season and playoffs ===
| | | | Regular season | | | | | Playoffs |
| Season | Team | League | GP | G | A | Pts | PIM | GP | G | A | Pts | PIM |
|---|---|---|---|---|---|---|---|---|---|---|---|---|
| 1996–97 | Lethbridge Hurricanes | WHL | 3 | 1 | 0 | 1 | 0 | — | — | — | — | — |
| 1997–98 | Prince Albert Raiders | WHL | 67 | 6 | 12 | 18 | 170 | — | — | — | — | — |
| 1998–99 | Prince Albert Raiders | WHL | 67 | 8 | 20 | 28 | 127 | 14 | 4 | 9 | 13 | 16 |
| 1999–00 | Prince Albert Raiders | WHL | 22 | 8 | 8 | 16 | 42 | — | — | — | — | — |
| 1999–00 | Red Deer Rebels | WHL | 46 | 13 | 27 | 40 | 116 | 4 | 0 | 1 | 1 | 10 |
| 2000–01 | Red Deer Rebels | WHL | 65 | 28 | 37 | 65 | 135 | 22 | 5 | 10 | 15 | 54 |
| 2000–01 | Red Deer Rebels | M-Cup | — | — | — | — | — | 4 | 2 | 5 | 7 | 4 |
| 2001–02 | Wilkes-Barre/Scranton Penguins | AHL | 72 | 9 | 20 | 29 | 91 | — | — | — | — | — |
| 2002–03 | Pittsburgh Penguins | NHL | 3 | 0 | 0 | 0 | 4 | — | — | — | — | — |
| 2002–03 | Wilkes-Barre/Scranton Penguins | AHL | 74 | 18 | 18 | 36 | 101 | 4 | 0 | 2 | 2 | 20 |
| 2003–04 | Wilkes-Barre/Scranton Penguins | AHL | 58 | 4 | 17 | 21 | 96 | 8 | 0 | 2 | 2 | 3 |
| 2004–05 | Wilkes-Barre/Scranton Penguins | AHL | 67 | 11 | 19 | 30 | 145 | 5 | 0 | 0 | 0 | 2 |
| 2005–06 | Mora IK | SEL | 49 | 13 | 18 | 31 | 168 | 5 | 2 | 2 | 4 | 18 |
| 2006–07 | Malmo IF | SEL | 18 | 2 | 4 | 6 | 51 | — | — | — | — | — |
| 2006–07 | Karpat | SM-l | 25 | 4 | 12 | 16 | 16 | 10 | 1 | 9 | 10 | 18 |
| 2007–08 | Avangard Omsk | RSL | 45 | 9 | 13 | 22 | 46 | 1 | 0 | 0 | 0 | 2 |
| 2008–09 | Mora IK | SWE-2 | 9 | 2 | 8 | 10 | 14 | — | — | — | — | — |
| 2008–09 | Sibir Novosibirsk | KHL | 22 | 0 | 3 | 3 | 41 | — | — | — | — | — |
| 2009–10 | HIFK | SM-l | 35 | 6 | 8 | 14 | 90 | — | — | — | — | — |
| 2010–11 | Kölner Haie | DEL | 15 | 2 | 1 | 3 | 39 | — | — | — | — | — |
| 2011–12 | Vienna Capitals | AUT | 38 | 10 | 17 | 27 | 26 | — | — | — | — | — |
| 2011–12 | Jokerit | SM-l | 15 | 1 | 3 | 4 | 28 | 6 | 0 | 4 | 4 | 6 |
| 2012–13 | EC Salzburg | AUT | 26 | 3 | 11 | 14 | 24 | — | — | — | — | — |
| AHL totals | | | 271 | 42 | 74 | 116 | 433 | 17 | 0 | 4 | 4 | 59 |
| NHL totals | | | 3 | 0 | 0 | 0 | 4 | — | — | — | — | — |

== Awards and records ==
- WHL East Second All-Star Team (2000–01)
- Memorial Cup Champion (2000–01)
- Memorial Cup Tournament All-Star Team (2000–01)
- Named to CHL All-Star 2nd team (2000–01)
- SM-Liiga Kanada-Malja Champion (2006–07)

== Transactions ==
- November 19, 1999 - Traded to Red Deer (WHL) by Prince Albert (WHL) with Craig Brunel for Brent Hobday, Steven MacIntyre, Regan Darby and Scott McQueen.
- July 11, 2001 - Traded from Washington Capitals (NHL) with Kris Beech and Michal Sivek to Pittsburgh Penguins (NHL) for Jaromír Jágr and Frantisek Kucera.
- August 3, 2004 - Re-signed by the Pittsburgh Penguins to a one-year contract.
- May 31, 2005 - Signed with the Mora IK of the Elitserein (Sweden).
- July 30, 2006 - Signed as a free agent by Malmö Red Hawks (Sweden).
- November 8, 2006 - Signed as a free agent by Kärpät (Finland).
- July 20, 2007 - Signed as a free agent by Avangard Omsk (Russia).
- September 17, 2008 - Invited to training camp by the Anaheim Ducks
- September 29, 2008 - Assigned to Iowa Chops (AHL)
- October 13, 2008 - Signed as a free agent by Avangard Omsk (KHL)
- October 13, 2008 - Transferred to Sibir Novosibirsk (KHL)
- November 3, 2009 - Signed as a free agent by HIFK (Finland).
- July 23, 2010 - Signed as a free agent by the Cologne Sharks (Germany).
