= Jason Ryznar =

American ice hockey player

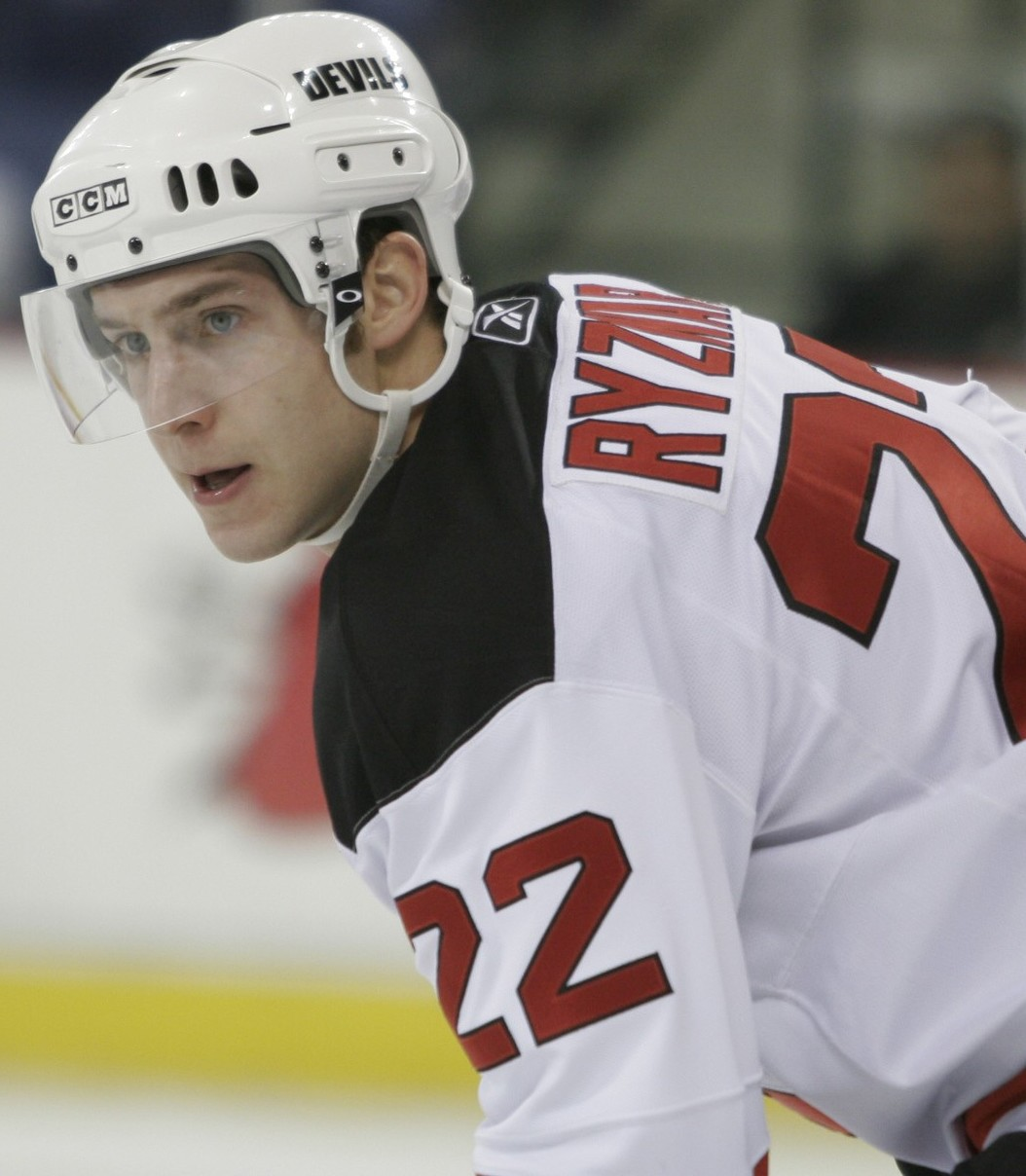
- Ryznar with the Lowell Devils during the 2007-08 season
- Born: February 19, 1983 (age 43) Anchorage, Alaska, U.S.
- Height: 6 ft 4 in (193 cm)
- Weight: 205 lb (93 kg; 14 st 9 lb)
- Position: Left wing
- Shot: Left
- Played for: New Jersey Devils; Albany River Rats; Lowell Devils; Houston Aeros; Alaska Aces
- National team: United States
- NHL draft: 64th overall, 2002; New Jersey Devils
- Playing career: 2005–2010

Jason R. Ryznar (born February 19, 1983) is an American former professional ice hockey player.

== Playing career ==
Typically playing as a left winger, Ryznar was selected by the New Jersey Devils as the 64th choice (third round) of the 2002 NHL entry draft.

Rynzar played for the United States Junior National Team in 2000 and 2001 before heading to the University of Michigan where he would play for four seasons, growing in stature as a checking line player.

In 2005–06, Ryznar played with the Albany River Rats of the American Hockey League, the Devils minor-league affiliate.

In January 2005, he was called up by the Devils - due to injuries and suspensions - and played sparingly as a fourth-liner. His call-up as a first-year pro was a rarity for the normally deep and methodical New Jersey Devils.

After the 2007–08 season, Ryznar wasn't offered a contract by the Devils and was invited to the Minnesota Wild training camp on September 18, 2008. Ryznar was then sent on a try-out to affiliate, Houston Aeros, on September 28, 2008. Ryznar made the Aeros opening night roster for the 2008–09 season.

== Career statistics ==
=== Regular season and playoffs ===
| | | | Regular season | | | | | Playoffs |
| Season | Team | League | GP | G | A | Pts | PIM | GP | G | A | Pts | PIM |
|---|---|---|---|---|---|---|---|---|---|---|---|---|
| 1998–99 | Service High School | HSAK |
| 1999–2000 | US NTDP Juniors | USHL | 3 | 0 | 1 | 1 | 0 | 3 | 1 | 1 | 2 | 4 |
| 1999–2000 | US NTDP U18 | NAHL | 52 | 5 | 10 | 15 | 22 | — | — | — | — | — |
| 2000–01 | US NTDP Juniors | USHL | 24 | 4 | 3 | 7 | 31 | — | — | — | — | — |
| 2000–01 | US NTDP U18 | USDP | 42 | 11 | 14 | 25 | 71 | — | — | — | — | — |
| 2001–02 | University of Michigan | CCHA | 40 | 9 | 7 | 16 | 22 | — | — | — | — | — |
| 2002–03 | University of Michigan | CCHA | 34 | 7 | 9 | 16 | 22 | — | — | — | — | — |
| 2003–04 | University of Michigan | CCHA | 36 | 6 | 11 | 17 | 28 | — | — | — | — | — |
| 2004–05 | University of Michigan | CCHA | 36 | 6 | 17 | 23 | 46 | — | — | — | — | — |
| 2005–06 | Albany River Rats | AHL | 59 | 7 | 18 | 25 | 52 | — | — | — | — | — |
| 2005–06 | New Jersey Devils | NHL | 8 | 0 | 0 | 0 | 2 | — | — | — | — | — |
| 2006–07 | Lowell Devils | AHL | 55 | 5 | 5 | 10 | 55 | — | — | — | — | — |
| 2007–08 | Lowell Devils | AHL | 55 | 10 | 8 | 18 | 38 | — | — | — | — | — |
| 2008–09 | Houston Aeros | AHL | 77 | 4 | 2 | 6 | 56 | 10 | 0 | 2 | 2 | 2 |
| 2009–10 | Alaska Aces | ECHL | 58 | 9 | 11 | 20 | 46 | 4 | 1 | 1 | 2 | 6 |
| AHL totals | | | 246 | 26 | 33 | 59 | 171 | 10 | 0 | 2 | 2 | 2 |
| NHL totals | | | 8 | 0 | 0 | 0 | 2 | — | — | — | — | — |

=== International ===
| Year | Team | Event | Result | GP | G | A | Pts | PIM |
|---|---|---|---|---|---|---|---|---|
| 2000 | United States | U17 | 4th | 6 | 0 | 1 | 1 |
| 2001 | United States | WJC18 | 6th | 6 | 1 | 2 | 3 | 0 |
| Junior totals | | | | 12 | 1 | 3 | 4 | 0 |
