= Denis Grot =

Belarusian ice hockey player

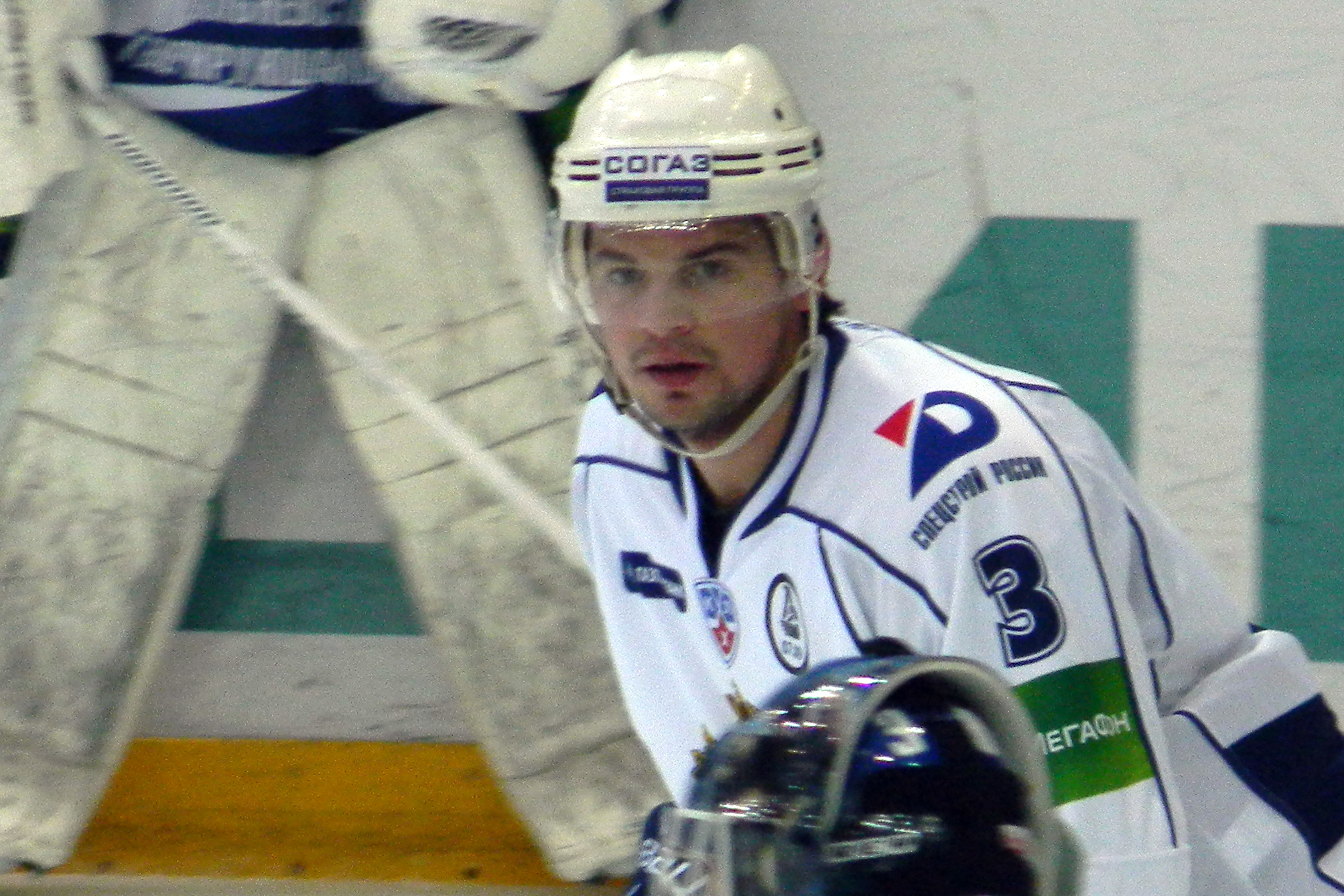
- Denis Grot
- Born: January 6, 1984 (age 42) Minsk, USSR
- Height: 6 ft 0 in (183 cm)
- Weight: 172 lb (78 kg; 12 st 4 lb)
- Position: Defence
- Shot: Left
- Played for: Elemash Elektrostal; Lokomotiv Yaroslavl; HK Lipetsk; Sibir Novosibirsk; Amur Khabarovsk; HC Spartak Moscow; Neftekhimik Nizhnekamsk; Avtomobilist Yekaterinburg; Torpedo Nizhny Novgorod; HC Sarov; Yugra Khanty-Mansiysk; Toros Neftekamsk
- NHL draft: 55th overall, 2002; Vancouver Canucks
- Playing career: 2001–2015

Denis Grot (born 6 January 1984) is a Belarusian-born former ice hockey player who last played for Toros Neftekamsk in the Supreme Hockey League (VHL). He was selected by Vancouver Canucks in the 2nd round (55th overall) of the 2002 NHL entry draft.

== Career statistics ==
=== Regular season and playoffs ===
			Regular season					Playoffs
Season	Team	League	GP	G	A	Pts	PIM	GP	G	A	Pts	PIM
2000–01	Lokomotiv–2 Yaroslavl	RUS.3	28	5	5	10	12	—	—	—	—	—
2001–02	Lokomotiv–2 Yaroslavl	RUS.3	14	1	0	1	10	—	—	—	—	—
2001–02	Elemash Elektrostal	RUS.2	33	1	1	2	42	—	—	—	—	—
2001–02	Elemash–2 Elektrostal	RUS.3	3	0	1	1	2	—	—	—	—	—
2002–03	HC Lipetsk	RUS.2	28	4	4	8	28	—	—	—	—	—
2002–03	Lokomotiv–2 Yaroslavl	RUS.3	9	1	2	3	2	—	—	—	—	—
2003–04	Lokomotiv Yaroslavl	RSL	31	0	2	2	4	3	0	0	0	2
2003–04	Lokomotiv–2 Yaroslavl	RUS.3	6	1	2	3	0	—	—	—	—	—
2004–05	Lokomotiv Yaroslavl	RSL	1	0	0	0	2	—	—	—	—	—
2004–05	Lokomotiv–2 Yaroslavl	RUS.3	20	2	3	5	24	—	—	—	—	—
2004–05	Sibir Novosibirsk	RSL	23	0	4	4	32	—	—	—	—	—
2004–05	Amur Khabarovsk	RUS.2	9	1	5	6	2	12	0	0	0	31
2005–06	Spartak Moscow	RSL	48	1	4	5	28	3	0	0	0	0
2006–07	Neftekhimik Nizhnekamsk	RSL	38	2	7	9	59	1	0	0	0	2
2007–08	Neftekhimik Nizhnekamsk	RSL	48	0	3	3	32	5	0	0	0	4
2008–09	Sibir Novosibirsk	KHL	54	0	5	5	36	—	—	—	—	—
2009–10	Avtomobilist Yekaterinburg	KHL	38	1	3	4	34	4	0	0	0	2
2010–11	Torpedo Nizhny Novgorod	KHL	48	0	4	4	34	—	—	—	—	—
2011–12	Torpedo Nizhny Novgorod	KHL	2	0	0	0	2	—	—	—	—	—
2011–12	HC Sarov	VHL	1	0	1	1	0	—	—	—	—	—
2011–12	Amur Khabarovsk	KHL	18	1	1	2	10	3	0	0	0	0
2012–13	Neftekhimik Nizhnekamsk	KHL	28	1	0	1	8	4	0	0	0	0
2013–14	Neftekhimik Nizhnekamsk	KHL	1	0	0	0	4	—	—	—	—	—
2013–14	HC Yugra	KHL	3	1	0	1	0	—	—	—	—	—
2014–15	Toros Neftekamsk	VHL	31	0	5	5	8	11	0	2	2	2
RSL totals			189	3	20	23	157	12	0	0	0	8
KHL totals			192	4	13	17	128	11	0	0	0	2

=== International ===
Year	Team	Event	GP	G	A	Pts	PIM
2001	Russia	U18	5	0	1	1	2
2002	Russia	WJC18	8	0	2	2	10
2004	Russia	WJC	6	0	0	0	6
Junior totals			19	0	3	3	18
