= Petr Punčochář =

Czech ice hockey player

- Born: June 8, 1983 (age 42) Tábor, Czechoslovakia
- Height: 6 ft 0 in (183 cm)
- Weight: 207 lb (94 kg; 14 st 11 lb)
- Position: Defence
- Shot: Right
- Czech Extraliga team: HC Vítkovice
- NHL draft: 186th overall, 2001; Chicago Blackhawks
- Playing career: 2000–2019

Petr Punčochář (born June 8, 1983) is a Czech professional ice hockey player. He was selected by the Chicago Blackhawks in the 6th round (186th overall) of the 2001 NHL entry draft.

Puncochar played with HC Vítkovice in the Czech Extraliga during the 2010–11 Czech Extraliga season.

== Career statistics ==
=== Regular season and playoffs ===
| | | | Regular season | | | | | Playoffs |
| Season | Team | League | GP | G | A | Pts | PIM | GP | G | A | Pts | PIM |
|---|---|---|---|---|---|---|---|---|---|---|---|---|
| 1999–2000 | HC České Budějovice | CZE U20 | 18 | 1 | 3 | 4 | 4 | — | — | — | — | — |
| 1999–2000 | HC Becherovka Karlovy Vary | CZE U20 | 23 | 1 | 1 | 2 | 4 | 2 | 0 | 0 | 0 | 2 |
| 1999–2000 | HC Becherovka Karlovy Vary | ELH | 1 | 0 | 0 | 0 | 0 | — | — | — | — | — |
| 2000–01 | HC Becherovka Karlovy Vary | CZE U20 | 30 | 6 | 5 | 11 | 14 | — | — | — | — | — |
| 2000–01 | HC Becherovka Karlovy Vary | ELH | 8 | 1 | 0 | 1 | 4 | — | — | — | — | — |
| 2000–01 | SK HC Baník Most | CZE.3 | 1 | 0 | 0 | 0 | 0 | — | — | — | — | — |
| 2001–02 | HC Becherovka Karlovy Vary | CZE U20 | 5 | 0 | 0 | 0 | 6 | — | — | — | — | — |
| 2001–02 | HC Becherovka Karlovy Vary | ELH | 32 | 0 | 2 | 2 | 36 | — | — | — | — | — |
| 2001–02 | HC Baník CHZ Sokolov | CZE.3 | 4 | 0 | 1 | 1 | 0 | 3 | 2 | 0 | 2 | 0 |
| 2002–03 | HC Energie Karlovy Vary | CZE U20 | 15 | 5 | 4 | 9 | 8 | — | — | — | — | — |
| 2002–03 | HC Energie Karlovy Vary | ELH | 17 | 0 | 3 | 3 | 16 | — | — | — | — | — |
| 2002–03 | HC Havířov Panthers | ELH | 9 | 0 | 0 | 0 | 2 | — | — | — | — | — |
| 2002–03 | KLH Chomutov | CZE.2 | 5 | 0 | 1 | 1 | 2 | — | — | — | — | — |
| 2003–04 | HC JME Znojemští Orli | ELH | 4 | 0 | 0 | 0 | 0 | — | — | — | — | — |
| 2003–04 | HC Energie Karlovy Vary | CZE U20 | 2 | 0 | 0 | 0 | 0 | — | — | — | — | — |
| 2003–04 | HC Dukla Jihlava | CZE.2 U20 | 8 | 2 | 2 | 4 | | — | — | — | — | — |
| 2003–04 | HC Energie Karlovy Vary | ELH | 1 | 0 | 0 | 0 | 2 | — | — | — | — | — |
| 2003–04 | SK Kadaň | CZE.2 | 20 | 3 | 0 | 3 | 14 | — | — | — | — | — |
| 2003–04 | HC Dukla Jihlava | CZE.2 | 14 | 0 | 0 | 0 | 14 | 16 | 1 | 4 | 5 | 12 |
| 2004–05 | HC Dukla Jihlava | ELH | 51 | 1 | 4 | 5 | 22 | — | — | — | — | — |
| 2004–05 | IHC Písek | CZE.2 | 1 | 0 | 0 | 0 | 0 | — | — | — | — | — |
| 2005–06 | HC Chemopetrol, a.s. | ELH | 49 | 2 | 4 | 6 | 44 | — | — | — | — | — |
| 2006–07 | HC Chemopetrol, a.s. | ELH | 44 | 4 | 2 | 6 | 38 | — | — | — | — | — |
| 2006–07 | HC Dukla Jihlava | CZE.2 | 1 | 0 | 2 | 2 | 0 | — | — | — | — | — |
| 2007–08 | HC Litvínov | ELH | 50 | 3 | 3 | 6 | 75 | 5 | 0 | 1 | 1 | 6 |
| 2008–09 | HC Litvínov | ELH | 52 | 4 | 6 | 10 | 40 | 4 | 0 | 1 | 1 | 4 |
| 2009–10 | HC BENZINA Litvínov | ELH | 46 | 0 | 3 | 3 | 50 | 5 | 1 | 1 | 2 | 10 |
| 2010–11 | HC Vítkovice Steel | ELH | 51 | 2 | 11 | 13 | 44 | 15 | 0 | 1 | 1 | 0 |
| 2011–12 | HC Vítkovice Steel | ELH | 38 | 1 | 3 | 4 | 18 | 7 | 1 | 0 | 1 | 6 |
| 2013–14 | HC Vítkovice Steel | ELH | 3 | 0 | 0 | 0 | 6 | — | — | — | — | — |
| 2013–14 | HC AZ Havířov 2010 | CZE.2 | 25 | 1 | 4 | 5 | 24 | 4 | 0 | 1 | 1 | 4 |
| 2014–15 | ČEZ Motor České Budějovice | CZE.2 | 48 | 5 | 15 | 20 | 26 | 23 | 1 | 5 | 6 | 18 |
| 2015–16 | HC Slavia Praha | CZE.2 | 19 | 1 | 4 | 5 | 22 | — | — | — | — | — |
| 2015–16 | HC AZ Havířov 2010 | CZE.2 | 17 | 0 | 3 | 3 | 2 | 8 | 0 | 3 | 3 | 10 |
| 2016–17 | Diables Rouges de Briançon | FRA.2 | 24 | 1 | 5 | 6 | 14 | 3 | 0 | 1 | 1 | 0 |
| 2017–18 | OLH Spartak Soběslav | CZE.4 | | 7 | 9 | 16 | | — | — | — | — | — |
| 2018–19 | OLH Spartak Soběslav | CZE.4 | | 0 | 1 | 1 | | — | — | — | — | — |
| ELH totals | | | 456 | 18 | 41 | 59 | 397 | 36 | 2 | 4 | 6 | 26 |
| CZE.2 totals | | | 150 | 10 | 29 | 39 | 105 | 51 | 2 | 13 | 15 | 44 |

=== International ===
| Year | Team | Event | GP | G | A | Pts | PIM |
|---|---|---|---|---|---|---|---|
| 2000 | Czech Republic | WJC18 | 6 | 0 | 0 | 0 | 4 |
| 2001 | Czech Republic | WJC18 | 7 | 2 | 3 | 5 | 0 |
| 2004 | Czech Republic | WJC | 6 | 1 | 0 | 1 | 2 |
| Junior totals | | | 19 | 3 | 3 | 6 | 6 |
