= František Kučera =

Czech ice hockey player

- Born: February 3, 1968 (age 57); Prague, Czechoslovakia
- Height: 6 ft 2 in (188 cm)
- Weight: 205 lb (93 kg; 14 st 9 lb)
- Position: Defence
- Shot: Left
- Played for: Chicago Blackhawks; Hartford Whalers; Vancouver Canucks; Philadelphia Flyers; Columbus Blue Jackets; Pittsburgh Penguins; Washington Capitals
- National team: Czech Republic
- NHL draft: 77th overall, 1986; Chicago Blackhawks
- Playing career: 1990–2005

Olympic medal record

Men's ice hockey
Gold medal – first place	1998 Nagano	Ice Hockey

František Kučera (born February 3, 1968) is a Czech former professional ice hockey defenceman who played in the National Hockey League (NHL) for the Chicago Blackhawks, Hartford Whalers, Vancouver Canucks, Philadelphia Flyers, Columbus Blue Jackets, Pittsburgh Penguins and Washington Capitals.

== Playing career ==
Originally drafted in 1986 by the Chicago Blackhawks, Kučera played parts of four seasons with Chicago before he was traded to the Hartford Whalers. He would also play for the Vancouver Canucks and Philadelphia Flyers before he returned to play hockey in the Czech Republic at the end of the 1996–97 NHL season.

Three years later, when the NHL expanded again, Kučera returned to North America and signed with the Columbus Blue Jackets. Midway through the season, he was traded to the Pittsburgh Penguins. He was traded again, this time to the Washington Capitals in the deal that also sent Jaromír Jágr to Washington. After playing a season, he once again returned to the Czech Republic to play hockey.

Kučera played 465 NHL games, scoring 24 goals and 95 assists. In 1998, he was a member of the Czech Olympic Team and won the golden Olympic medal.

== Career statistics ==
=== Regular season and playoffs ===
			Regular season					Playoffs
Season	Team	League	GP	G	A	Pts	PIM	GP	G	A	Pts	PIM
1985–86	TJ Sparta ČKD Praha	TCH Jr	25	2	16	18	—	—	—	—	—	—
1985–86	TJ Sparta ČKD Praha	TCH	15	0	0	0	10	—	—	—	—	—
1986–87	TJ Sparta ČKD Praha	TCH	34	4	2	6	14	6	1	0	1	—
1987–88	TJ Sparta ČKD Praha	TCH	45	7	2	9	30	—	—	—	—	—
1988–89	ASD Dukla Jihlava	TCH	34	6	6	12	28	11	4	3	7	—
1989–90	ASD Dukla Jihlava	TCH	40	9	10	19	42	1	1	0	1	0
1990–91	Indianapolis Ice	IHL	35	8	19	27	23	7	0	1	1	15
1990–91	Chicago Blackhawks	NHL	40	2	12	14	32	—	—	—	—	—
1991–92	Indianapolis Ice	IHL	7	1	2	3	4	—	—	—	—	—
1991–92	Chicago Blackhawks	NHL	61	3	10	13	36	6	0	0	0	0
1992–93	Chicago Blackhawks	NHL	71	5	14	19	59	—	—	—	—	—
1993–94	Chicago Blackhawks	NHL	60	4	13	17	34	—	—	—	—	—
1993–94	Hartford Whalers	NHL	16	1	3	4	14	—	—	—	—	—
1994–95	HC Sparta Praha	ELH	16	1	2	3	14	—	—	—	—	—
1994–95	Hartford Whalers	NHL	48	3	17	20	30	—	—	—	—	—
1995–96	Hartford Whalers	NHL	30	2	6	8	10	—	—	—	—	—
1995–96	Vancouver Canucks	NHL	24	1	0	1	10	6	0	1	1	0
1996–97	Houston Aeros	IHL	12	0	3	3	20	—	—	—	—	—
1996–97	Vancouver Canucks	NHL	2	0	0	0	0	—	—	—	—	—
1996–97	Syracuse Crunch	AHL	42	6	29	35	36	—	—	—	—	—
1996–97	Philadelphia Flyers	NHL	2	0	0	0	2	—	—	—	—	—
1996–97	Philadelphia Phantoms	AHL	9	1	5	6	2	10	1	6	7	20
1997–98	HC Sparta Praha	ELH	42	8	11	19	44	9	3	1	4	53
1998–99	HC Sparta Praha	ELH	41	3	12	15	92	8	0	2	2	34
1999–2000	HC Sparta Praha	ELH	51	7	26	33	46	9	1	9	10	4
2000–01	Columbus Blue Jackets	NHL	48	2	5	7	12	—	—	—	—	—
2000–01	Pittsburgh Penguins	NHL	7	0	2	2	0	—	—	—	—	—
2001–02	Washington Capitals	NHL	56	1	13	14	12	—	—	—	—	—
2001–02	HC Sparta Praha	ELH	10	2	2	4	2	—	—	—	—	—
2002–03	HC Slavia Praha	ELH	44	4	15	19	26	6	0	1	1	0
2003–04	HC Slavia Praha	ELH	11	1	1	2	6	16	0	2	2	6
2004–05	HC Slavia Praha	ELH	8	0	0	0	4	—	—	—	—	—
TCH totals			168	26	20	46	124	18	6	3	9	—
NHL totals			465	24	95	119	251	12	0	1	1	0
ELH totals			223	26	69	95	234	48	4	15	19	97

=== International ===
Year	Team	Event	GP	G	A	Pts	PIM
1985	Czechoslovakia	EJC	5	0	2	2	2
1986	Czechoslovakia	EJC	5	1	2	3	4
1987	Czechoslovakia	WJC	7	1	2	3	2
1988	Czechoslovakia	WJC	7	1	2	3	2
1989	Czechoslovakia	WC	6	0	1	1	6
1991	Czechoslovakia	CC	5	0	0	0	4
1994	Czech Republic	WC	4	0	0	0	2
1998	Czech Republic	OG	6	0	0	0	0
1998	Czech Republic	WC	8	4	0	4	4
1999	Czech Republic	WC	10	0	6	6	6
2000	Czech Republic	WC	9	2	2	4	6
Junior totals			24	3	8	11	10
Senior totals			48	6	9	15	28
