= Michal Sivek =

Czech ice hockey player (born 1981)

- Born: January 21, 1981 (age 45) Náchod, Czechoslovakia
- Height: 6 ft 3 in (191 cm)
- Weight: 209 lb (95 kg; 14 st 13 lb)
- Position: Centre
- Shot: Left
- Played for: Sparta Praha; Kladno; Pittsburgh Penguins
- NHL draft: 29th overall, 1999; Washington Capitals
- Playing career: 1997–2008

Michal Sivek (born January 21, 1981) is a Czech former professional ice hockey player. He played 38 games in the National Hockey League with the Pittsburgh Penguins during the 2002–03 season. The rest of his career, which lasted from 1997 to 2008, was mainly spent in the Czech Extraliga. Internationally Sivek played for the Czech national junior team in several tournaments, including three World Junior Championships, winning two gold medals.

== Playing career ==
On October 1, 2001, Sivek was one of three players traded from the Washington Capitals for Jaromír Jágr from the Pittsburgh Penguins. He made his NHL debut the following season with the Penguins on November 30, 2002, against the Buffalo Sabres.

Sivek retired after the 2007–08 season due to unspecified health issues.

== International play ==
Medal record

Representing Czech Republic

World Junior Championships
| Gold medal – first place | 2001 Russia | |
| Gold medal – first place | 2000 Sweden | |

Sivek played for the Czech national junior team in several tournaments. He won a gold medal at both the 2000 and 2001 World Junior Championships.

== Post-retirement ==
He is now a player-agent for Eurohockey Services, co-managing the agency with former Pittsburgh Penguins teammate Vladimír Vůjtek.

== Career statistics ==
=== Regular season and playoffs ===
| | | | Regular season | | | | | Playoffs |
| Season | Team | League | GP | G | A | Pts | PIM | GP | G | A | Pts | PIM |
|---|---|---|---|---|---|---|---|---|---|---|---|---|
| 1996–97 | HC Sparta Praha | CZE U18 | 13 | 11 | 7 | 18 | — | — | — | — | — | — |
| 1996–97 | HC Sparta Praha | CZE U20 | 25 | 7 | 4 | 11 | — | — | — | — | — | — |
| 1997–98 | HC Sparta Praha | CZE U18 | 1 | 0 | 0 | 0 | — | — | — | — | — | — |
| 1997–98 | HC Sparta Praha | CZE U20 | 20 | 13 | 8 | 21 | — | — | — | — | — | — |
| 1997–98 | HC Sparta Praha | CZE | 25 | 1 | 1 | 2 | 10 | 5 | 1 | 0 | 1 | 0 |
| 1998–99 | HC Sparta Praha | CZE | 2 | 1 | 0 | 1 | 2 | — | — | — | — | — |
| 1998–99 | HC Velvana Kladno | CZE | 34 | 3 | 8 | 11 | 24 | — | — | — | — | — |
| 1999–00 | Prince Albert Raiders | WHL | 53 | 23 | 37 | 60 | 65 | 6 | 1 | 4 | 5 | 10 |
| 2000–01 | HC Sparta Praha | CZE | 32 | 6 | 7 | 13 | 28 | 13 | 4 | 2 | 6 | 8 |
| 2001–02 | Wilkes–Barre/Scranton Penguins | AHL | 25 | 4 | 8 | 12 | 30 | — | — | — | — | — |
| 2001–02 | HC Sparta Praha | CZE | 17 | 5 | 3 | 8 | 20 | 12 | 0 | 1 | 1 | 10 |
| 2002–03 | Wilkes–Barre/Scranton Penguins | AHL | 40 | 10 | 17 | 27 | 33 | 6 | 3 | 2 | 5 | 20 |
| 2002–03 | Pittsburgh Penguins | NHL | 38 | 3 | 3 | 6 | 14 | — | — | — | — | — |
| 2003–04 | Wilkes–Barre/Scranton Penguins | AHL | 22 | 4 | 7 | 11 | 6 | — | — | — | — | — |
| 2004–05 | HC Sparta Praha | CZE | 37 | 1 | 5 | 6 | 48 | 5 | 0 | 0 | 0 | 2 |
| 2005–06 | HC Sparta Praha | CZE | 36 | 10 | 9 | 19 | 30 | 17 | 4 | 1 | 5 | 18 |
| 2006–07 | HC Sparta Praha | CZE | 47 | 10 | 8 | 18 | 76 | 16 | 3 | 3 | 6 | 32 |
| 2007–08 | HC Sparta Praha | CZE | 46 | 9 | 10 | 19 | 94 | 2 | 1 | 0 | 1 | 2 |
| CZE totals | | | 276 | 46 | 51 | 97 | 332 | 70 | 13 | 7 | 20 | 72 |
| NHL totals | | | 38 | 3 | 3 | 6 | 14 | — | — | — | — | — |

=== International ===
| Year | Team | Event | GP | G | A | Pts | PIM |
|---|---|---|---|---|---|---|---|
| 1998 | Czech Republic | EJC | 6 | 4 | 6 | 10 | 8 |
| 1999 | Czech Republic | WJC | 6 | 1 | 0 | 1 | 14 |
| 1999 | Czech Republic | WJC18 | 7 | 2 | 5 | 7 | 12 |
| 2000 | Czech Republic | WJC | 7 | 3 | 3 | 6 | 4 |
| 2001 | Czech Republic | WJC | 7 | 2 | 2 | 4 | 10 |
| Junior totals | | | 33 | 12 | 16 | 28 | 48 |
