= 2002 Western Conference Finals =

2002 Western Conference Finals might refer to:

- The Western Conference Finals of the 2002 Stanley Cup Playoffs
- The Western Conference Finals of the 2002 NBA Playoffs
