= 2004 Stanley Cup playoffs =

Playoffs with the Tampa Bay Lightning winning against the Calgary Flames

Tournament details
- Dates: April 7–June 7, 2004
- Teams: 16
- Defending champions: New Jersey Devils

Final positions
- Champions: Tampa Bay Lightning
- Runners-up: Calgary Flames

Tournament statistics
- Scoring leader(s): Brad Richards (Lightning) (26 points)

Awards
- MVP: Brad Richards (Lightning)

The 2004 Stanley Cup playoffs for the National Hockey League began on April 7, 2004, following the 2003–04 regular season. The playoffs ended with the Tampa Bay Lightning winning the Stanley Cup with a seven-game series win over the Calgary Flames on June 7. It was Tampa Bay's first Stanley Cup championship. It was the Flames' third final appearance, losing to the Montreal Canadiens in 1986 and beating the Canadiens in the 1989 rematch. These playoffs ended up being the last playoff tournament until 2006 due to the 2004–05 NHL lockout that resulted in the cancellation of the following season. The 16 qualified teams, eight from each conference, played best-of-seven games for conference quarterfinals, semifinals and finals. The winner of each conference proceeded to the Stanley Cup Final. The format was identical to the one introduced for the 1999 playoffs.

These playoffs marked the first time the Nashville Predators qualified, being in their sixth season in the NHL. This would be the last time that all three Eastern Canadian teams would make the playoffs together until 2013 and five Canadian teams total until 2015. This was the last time until 2019 that both Southern California teams, the Los Angeles Kings and Anaheim Ducks, missed the playoffs.

The Flames tied the 1987 Philadelphia Flyers for the most games played (26) in one playoff year (later matched by the 2014 Los Angeles Kings, 2015 Tampa Bay Lightning, and 2019 St. Louis Blues), all under a four-round playoff format. The record was subsequently broken by the Dallas Stars during the 2020 Stanley Cup playoffs, albeit due to the expanded playoff format.

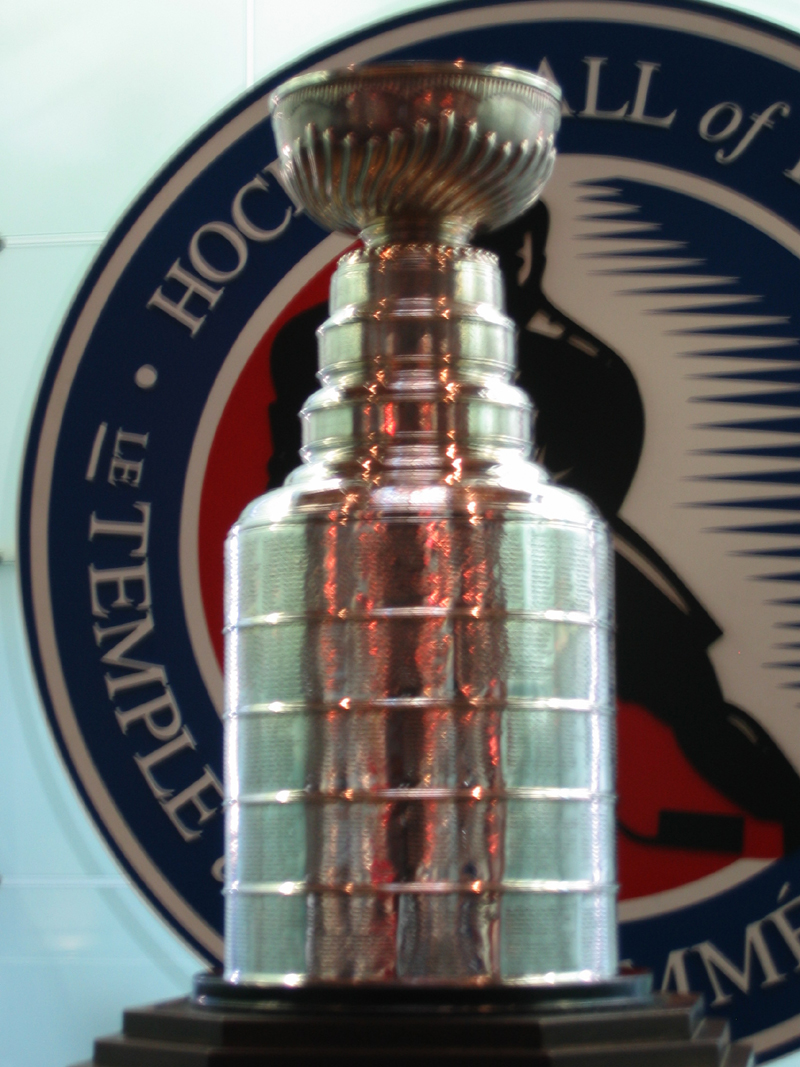
The Stanley Cup, awarded to the champion of the NHL.

== Playoff seeds ==
The top eight teams in each conference qualified for the playoffs. The top three seeds in each conference were awarded to the division winners; while the five remaining spots were awarded to the highest finishers in their respective conferences.

The following teams qualified for the playoffs:

=== Eastern Conference ===
1. Tampa Bay Lightning, Southeast Division champions, Eastern Conference regular season champions – 106 points
2. Boston Bruins, Northeast Division champions – 104 points
3. Philadelphia Flyers, Atlantic Division champions – 101 points
4. Toronto Maple Leafs – 103 points
5. Ottawa Senators – 102 points
6. New Jersey Devils – 100 points
7. Montreal Canadiens – 93 points
8. New York Islanders – 91 points

=== Western Conference ===
1. Detroit Red Wings, Central Division champions, Western Conference regular season champions, Presidents' Trophy winners – 109 points
2. San Jose Sharks, Pacific Division champions – 104 points
3. Vancouver Canucks, Northwest Division champions – 101 points
4. Colorado Avalanche – 100 points
5. Dallas Stars – 97 points
6. Calgary Flames – 94 points
7. St. Louis Blues – 91 points (39 wins)
8. Nashville Predators – 91 points (38 wins)

== Playoff bracket ==
In each round, teams competed in a best-of-seven series following a 2–2–1–1–1 format (scores in the bracket indicate the number of games won in each best-of-seven series). The team with home ice advantage played at home for games one and two (and games five and seven, if necessary), and the other team played at home for games three and four (and game six, if necessary). The top eight teams in each conference made the playoffs, with the three division winners seeded 1–3 based on regular season record, and the five remaining teams seeded 4–8.

The NHL used "re-seeding" instead of a fixed bracket playoff system. During the first three rounds, the highest remaining seed in each conference was matched against the lowest remaining seed, the second-highest remaining seed played the second-lowest remaining seed, and so forth. The higher-seeded team was awarded home ice advantage. The two conference winners then advanced to the Stanley Cup Finals, where home ice advantage was awarded to the team that had the better regular season record.

Conference quarterfinals	Conference semifinals
1	Tampa Bay	4
8	NY Islanders	1
1	Tampa Bay	4
7	Montreal	0
2	Boston	3
7	Montreal	4
Eastern Conference
3	Philadelphia	4
6	New Jersey	1
3	Philadelphia	4
4	Toronto	2
4	Toronto	4
5	Ottawa	3
1	Detroit	4
8	Nashville	2
1	Detroit	2
6	Calgary	4
2	San Jose	4
7	St. Louis	1
Western Conference
3	Vancouver	3
6	Calgary	4
2	San Jose	4
4	Colorado	2
4	Colorado	4
5	Dallas	1

Conference finals
1	Tampa Bay	4
3	Philadelphia	3
6	Calgary	4
2	San Jose	2

Stanley Cup Final
E1	Tampa Bay	4
W6	Calgary	3

== Conference quarterfinals ==
=== Eastern Conference quarterfinals ===
==== (1) Tampa Bay Lightning vs. (8) New York Islanders ====
The Tampa Bay Lightning entered the playoffs as the Eastern Conference regular season and Southeast Division champions with 106 points. New York qualified as the eighth seed earning 91 points during the regular season. This was the first playoff series between these two teams. The Islanders won three of the four games in this year's regular season series.

Tampa Bay defeated the Islanders in five games. Games one and two saw goaltenders Nikolai Khabibulin of the Lightning and Rick DiPietro of the Islanders trade 3–0 shutouts, with Tampa Bay winning game one and New York winning game two. In games three and four, Khabibulin shut-out the Islanders winning both games by a score of 3–0. In game five, Martin St. Louis scored the game-winner four minutes into overtime.

April 8	New York Islanders	0–3	Tampa Bay Lightning	St. Pete Times Forum	Recap
No scoring		First period	No scoring
No scoring		Second period	05:07 – André Roy (1); 11:06 – Fredrik Modin (1)
No scoring		Third period	10:59 – pp – Fredrik Modin (2)
Rick DiPietro 15 saves / 18 shots		Goalie stats	Nikolai Khabibulin 30 saves / 30 shots

April 10	New York Islanders	3–0	Tampa Bay Lightning	St. Pete Times Forum	Recap
Janne Niinimaa (1) – pp – 11:42		First period	No scoring
No scoring		Second period	No scoring
Jason Blake (1) – 03:36; Jason Blake (2) – en – 19:05		Third period	No scoring
Rick DiPietro 22 saves / 22 shots		Goalie stats	Nikolai Khabibulin 22 saves / 25 shots

April 12	Tampa Bay Lightning	3–0	New York Islanders	Nassau Coliseum	Recap
Brad Richards (1) – pp – 03:40; Martin St. Louis (1) – 06:32		First period	No scoring
No scoring		Second period	No scoring
Martin St. Louis (2) – en – 19:50		Third period	No scoring
Nikolai Khabibulin 28 saves / 28 shots		Goalie stats	Rick DiPietro 21 saves / 23 shots

April 14	Tampa Bay Lightning	3–0	New York Islanders	Nassau Coliseum	Recap
Martin St. Louis (3) – sh – 10:30		First period	No scoring
Ruslan Fedotenko (1) – 18:03		Second period	No scoring
Fredrik Modin (3) – 01:34		Third period	No scoring
Nikolai Khabibulin 33 saves / 33 shots		Goalie stats	Rick DiPietro 17 saves / 20 shots

April 16	New York Islanders	2–3	OT	Tampa Bay Lightning	St. Pete Times Forum	Recap
Oleg Kvasha (1) – pp – 10:41		First period		No scoring
No scoring		Second period		16:18 – Tim Taylor (1); 18:22 – Ruslan Fedotenko (2)
Mark Parrish (1) – 07:28		Third period		No scoring
No scoring		First overtime period		04:07 – Martin St. Louis (4)
Rick DiPietro 34 saves / 37 shots		Goalie stats		Nikolai Khabibulin 24 saves / 26 shots

Tampa Bay won series 4–1

==== (2) Boston Bruins vs. (7) Montreal Canadiens ====
The Boston Bruins entered the playoffs as the Northeast Division champions, earning the second seed in the Eastern Conference with 104 points. Montreal qualified as the seventh seed, earning 93 points during the regular season. This was the thirtieth playoff series between these two rivals, with Montreal winning twenty-two of the twenty-nine previous series. They last met in the 2002 Eastern Conference quarterfinals, where Montreal won in six games. Boston won the season series earning seven of ten points during this year's five game regular season series.

The Canadiens overcame a 3–1 series deficit to eliminate the Bruins in seven games. In game one, the Bruins won a low scoring game 3–0, behind a 31-save shutout from goaltender Andrew Raycroft. In game two, Raycroft allowed one goal and Boston won the game 2–1. Montreal won game three, 3–2 on the back of two goals from Alexei Kovalev. The Canadiens were pushed to the brink of elimination with a 4–3 double-overtime loss in game four. Montreal won game five by a score of 5–1, scoring three third period goals to break open a close game. Montreal forced a seventh game with a 5–2 victory in game six. Montreal completed the comeback with a 2–0 victory in game seven, Richard Zednik scored both goals. Goaltender Jose Theodore shut-out the Bruins making 32 saves.

April 7	Montreal Canadiens	0–3	Boston Bruins	FleetCenter	Recap
No scoring		First period	05:12 – pp – Sergei Gonchar (1); 19:01 – Michael Nylander (1)
No scoring		Second period	18:24 – pp – Mike Knuble (1)
No scoring		Third period	No scoring
Jose Theodore 36 saves / 39 shots		Goalie stats	Andrew Raycroft 31 saves / 31 shots

April 9	Montreal Canadiens	1–2	OT	Boston Bruins	FleetCenter	Recap
No scoring		First period		15:22 – Michael Nylander (2)
Patrice Brisebois (1) – pp – 15:54		Second period		No scoring
No scoring		Third period		No scoring
No scoring		First overtime period		01:26 – Patrice Bergeron (1)
Jose Theodore 17 saves / 19 shots		Goalie stats		Andrew Raycroft 25 saves / 26 shots

April 11	Boston Bruins	2–3	Montreal Canadiens	Bell Centre	Recap
Andy Hilbert (1) – 06:34		First period	02:16 – Alexei Kovalev (1); 15:24 – Alexei Kovalev (2)
No scoring		Second period	13:32 – Andrei Markov (1)
Brian Rolston (1) – 03:35		Third period	No scoring
Andrew Raycroft 29 saves / 32 shots		Goalie stats	Jose Theodore 21 saves / 23 shots

April 13	Boston Bruins	4–3	2OT	Montreal Canadiens	Bell Centre	Recap
Michael Nylander (3) – 16:25		First period		04:41 – Mike Ribeiro (1); 19:55 – Alexei Kovalev (3)
Jiri Slegr (1) – 11:30		Second period		01:48 – Mike Ribeiro (2)
Mike Knuble (2) – 19:29		Third period		No scoring
Glen Murray (1) – 09:27		Second overtime period		No scoring
Andrew Raycroft 42 saves / 45 shots		Goalie stats		Jose Theodore 40 saves / 44 shots

April 15	Montreal Canadiens	5–1	Boston Bruins	FleetCenter	Recap
Yanic Perreault (1) – 05:43		First period	No scoring
Alexei Kovalev (4) – 07:39		Second period	No scoring
Richard Zednik (1) – 03:25; Saku Koivu (1) – pp – 11:16; Craig Rivet (1) – pp – 13:26		Third period	08:23 – Glen Murray (2)
Jose Theodore 43 saves / 44 shots		Goalie stats	Andrew Raycroft 25 saves / 30 shots

April 17	Boston Bruins	2–5	Montreal Canadiens	Bell Centre	Recap
Sergei Samsonov (1) – 07:16		First period	12:37 – Darren Langdon (1)
No scoring		Second period	06:03 – Saku Koivu (2); 14:23 – Yanic Perreault (2)
Sergei Samsonov (2) – 04:36		Third period	19:19 – en – Alexei Kovalev (5); 19:56 – en – Jan Bulis (1)
Andrew Raycroft 18 saves / 21 shots		Goalie stats	Jose Theodore 22 saves / 24 shots

April 19	Montreal Canadiens	2–0	Boston Bruins	FleetCenter	Recap
No scoring		First period	No scoring
No scoring		Second period	No scoring
Richard Zednik (2) – 10:52; Richard Zednik (3) – en – 19:52		Third period	No scoring
Jose Theodore 32 saves / 32 shots		Goalie stats	Andrew Raycroft 24 saves / 25 shots

Montreal won series 4–3

==== (3) Philadelphia Flyers vs. (6) New Jersey Devils ====
The Philadelphia Flyers entered the playoffs as the Atlantic Division champions, earning the third seed in the Eastern Conference with 101 points. New Jersey qualified as the sixth seed earning 100 points during the regular season. This was the fourth playoff meeting between these two teams with New Jersey winning two of the three previous series. They last met in the 2000 Eastern Conference Final where New Jersey won in seven games. Philadelphia won the season series earning seven of twelve points during this year's six game regular season series.

Philadelphia defeated New Jersey in five games. Keith Primeau scored the game-winning goal in game one as the Flyers hung on to win by a score of 3–2. In game two Mark Recchi gave the Flyers the lead on a power-play goal in the first period, the teams traded goals in the final two periods as Philadelphia won again 3–2. New Jersey scored three times on the power-play in game three as they won the game 4–2. Goaltender Robert Esche stopped 35 shots in game four to earn a 3–0 shutout victory for the Flyers. Danny Markov scored the series winning goal at 14:37 of the third period in game five as the Flyers defeated the Devils with a 3–1 victory.

April 8	New Jersey Devils	2–3	Philadelphia Flyers	Wachovia Center	Recap
No scoring		First period	10:19 – Simon Gagne (1)
No scoring		Second period	03:55 – pp – Jeremy Roenick (1)
Patrick Elias (1) – 03:53; Jan Hrdina (1) – 04:28		Third period	03:31 – Keith Primeau (1)
Martin Brodeur 23 saves / 26 shots		Goalie stats	Robert Esche 37 saves / 39 shots

April 10	New Jersey Devils	2–3	Philadelphia Flyers	Wachovia Center	Recap
No scoring		First period	14:49 – pp – Mark Recchi (1)
Jan Hrdina (2) – 04:44		Second period	07:24 – Alexei Zhamnov (1)
Brian Gionta (1) – 14:35		Third period	10:31 – Mattias Timander (1)
Martin Brodeur 15 saves / 18 shots		Goalie stats	Robert Esche 24 saves / 26 shots

April 12	Philadelphia Flyers	2–4	New Jersey Devils	Continental Airlines Arena	Recap
Jeremy Roenick (2) – pp – 08:49		First period	No scoring
Tony Amonte (1) – pp – 03:13		Second period	01:26 – Patrick Elias (2); 04:55 – pp – Paul Martin (1); 17:28 – pp – Patrik Elias (3)
No scoring		Third period	07:00 – pp – Brian Gionta (2)
Robert Esche 19 saves / 23 shots		Goalie stats	Martin Brodeur 23 saves / 25 shots

April 14	Philadelphia Flyers	3–0	New Jersey Devils	Continental Airlines Arena	Recap
Kim Johnsson (1) – 01:18		First period	No scoring
No scoring		Second period	No scoring
Alexei Zhamnov (2) – 04:45; Keith Primeau (2) – 16:02		Third period	No scoring
Robert Esche 35 saves / 35 shots		Goalie stats	Martin Brodeur 22 saves / 25 shots

April 17	New Jersey Devils	1–3	Philadelphia Flyers	Wachovia Center	Recap
No scoring		First period	13:38 – Alexei Zhamnov (3)
Scott Niedermayer (1) – 13:36		Second period	No scoring
No scoring		Third period	14:37 – Danny Markov (1); 19:52 – en – Sami Kapanen (1)
Martin Brodeur 37 saves / 39 shots		Goalie stats	Robert Esche 31 saves / 32 shots

Philadelphia won series 4–1

==== (4) Toronto Maple Leafs vs. (5) Ottawa Senators ====
The Toronto Maple Leafs entered the playoffs as the fourth seed in the Eastern Conference with 103 points. Ottawa qualified as the fifth seed earning 102 points during the regular season. This was the fourth playoff series in five years between these two teams, and the fourth series overall, Toronto won all three previous meetings. They last met in the 2002 Eastern Conference semifinals where Toronto won in seven games. Toronto won this year's six game regular season series earning nine of twelve points during the season.

The Maple Leafs eliminated the Senators in seven games. Ed Belfour had three shutouts in the series against the Senators. In game one Ottawa scored two power-play goals 38 seconds apart in the second period to pull out a 4–2 victory. The Maple Leafs came through with 2–0 win on the strength of a 31-save shutout by Belfour in game two. Toronto won game three 2–0 as Ed Belfour shutout Ottawa again. Ottawa finally scored late in the first period of game four and they would add three more goals to win the game 4–1. Tie Domi scored the game-winning goal in game five and Ed Belfour posted his third shutout of the series in yet another 2–0 Toronto victory. Ottawa won game six 2–1 in double-overtime as Mike Fisher scored at 1:47. In game seven, Ottawa goaltender Patrick Lalime gave up two goals to Joe Nieuwendyk before being pulled after the first period and replaced by backup Martin Prusek, as Toronto earned a series-clinching 4–1 win. This was the Maple Leafs' last postseason series win until 2023, and remains the last time they won the seventh game of a playoff series.

April 8	Ottawa Senators	4–2	Toronto Maple Leafs	Air Canada Centre	Recap
Bryan Smolinski (1) – 05:05		First period	03:15 – Joe Nieuwendyk (1); 18:33 – pp – Bryan McCabe (1)
Wade Redden (1) – pp – 10:02; Marian Hossa (1) – pp – 10:40		Second period	No scoring
Marian Hossa (2) – 01:39		Third period	No scoring
Patrick Lalime 15 saves / 17 shots		Goalie stats	Ed Belfour 26 saves / 30 shots

April 10	Ottawa Senators	0–2	Toronto Maple Leafs	Air Canada Centre	Recap
No scoring		First period	10:40 – Gary Roberts (1)
No scoring		Second period	06:02 – pp – Gary Roberts (2)
No scoring		Third period	No scoring
Patrick Lalime 24 saves / 26 shots		Goalie stats	Ed Belfour 31 saves / 31 shots

April 12	Toronto Maple Leafs	2–0	Ottawa Senators	Corel Centre	Recap
No scoring		First period	No scoring
Joe Nieuwendyk (2) – 01:30		Second period	No scoring
Mats Sundin (1) – 14:16		Third period	No scoring
Ed Belfour 37 saves / 37 shots		Goalie stats	Patrick Lalime 15 saves / 17 shots

April 14	Toronto Maple Leafs	1–4	Ottawa Senators	Corel Centre	Recap
Gary Roberts (3) – pp – 16:53		First period	19:24 – Daniel Alfredsson (1)
No scoring		Second period	13:15 – Marian Hossa (3)
No scoring		Third period	03:37 – Todd White (1); 08:00 – pp – Chris Phillips (1)
Ed Belfour 32 saves / 36 shots		Goalie stats	Patrick Lalime 23 saves / 24 shots

April 16	Ottawa Senators	0–2	Toronto Maple Leafs	Air Canada Centre	Recap
No scoring		First period	No scoring
No scoring		Second period	No scoring
No scoring		Third period	01:43 – Tie Domi (1); 15:18 – Joe Nieuwendyk (3)
Patrick Lalime 14 saves / 16 shots		Goalie stats	Ed Belfour 21 saves / 21 shots

April 18	Toronto Maple Leafs	1–2	2OT	Ottawa Senators	Corel Centre	Recap
Bryan McCabe (2) – pp – 04:14		First period		No scoring
No scoring		Second period		No scoring
No scoring		Third period		04:55 – Zdeno Chara (1)
No scoring		Second overtime period		01:47 – Mike Fisher (1)
Ed Belfour 44 saves / 46 shots		Goalie stats		Patrick Lalime 27 saves / 28 shots

April 20	Ottawa Senators	1–4	Toronto Maple Leafs	Air Canada Centre	Recap
No scoring		First period	06:19 – Chad Kilger (1); 07:41 – Joe Nieuwendyk (4); 19:39 – Joe Nieuwendyk (5)
Vaclav Varada (1) – 00:22		Second period	No scoring
No scoring		Third period	07:59 – Bryan McCabe (3)
Patrick Lalime 8 saves / 11 shots Martin Prusek 14 saves / 15 shots		Goalie stats	Ed Belfour 36 saves / 37 shots

Toronto won series 4–3

=== Western Conference quarterfinals ===
==== (1) Detroit Red Wings vs. (8) Nashville Predators ====
This was the first playoff meeting between the Red Wings and Predators. The Red Wings entered the playoffs as the Presidents' Trophy winners, the Western Conference regular season and Central Division champions, with 109 points. The Predators qualified as the eighth seed earning 91 points (losing the tiebreaker to St. Louis by having fewer wins) during the regular season. This was the first playoff meeting between these two teams. The Predators qualified for the playoffs for the first time since entering the league in the 1998–99 season. Nashville won the season series earning seven of twelve points during this year's six game regular season series.

Detroit defeated Nashville in six games. In Game 1, the Red Wings scored three times in the third period and posted a 3–1 victory. Mathieu Schneider scored the game-winning goal late in third period on the power-play in game two. Nashville struck twice in the first period of game three and Tomas Vokoun made 41 saves in the Predators first playoff victory in franchise history. Detroit heavily out-shot Nashville in game four as Predators' goaltender Tomas Vokoun posted a 41 save shutout in a 3–0 Nashville win. In game five, Curtis Joseph started in goal for the Red Wings, and Henrik Zetterberg scored a goal and an assist in the first six minutes of the game as the Red Wings dominated the Predators, winning 4–1. Detroit scored two goals 30 seconds apart in game six and Curtis Joseph posted a shutout as the Red Wings closed out the series with a 2–0 win.

April 7	Nashville Predators	1–3	Detroit Red Wings	Joe Louis Arena	Recap
Adam Hall (1) – 00:16		First period	No scoring
No scoring		Second period	No scoring
No scoring		Third period	00:37 – Kris Draper (1); 04:55 – Tomas Holmstrom (1); 18:15 – Robert Lang (1)
Tomas Vokoun 26 saves / 29 shots		Goalie stats	Manny Legace 23 saves / 24 shots

April 10	Nashville Predators	1–2	Detroit Red Wings	Joe Louis Arena	Recap
No scoring		First period	No scoring
Vladimir Orszagh (1) – 12:41		Second period	05:45 – Robert Lang (2)
No scoring		Third period	17:15 – pp – Mathieu Schneider (1)
Tomas Vokoun 26 saves / 28 shots		Goalie stats	Manny Legace 27 saves / 28 shots

April 11	Detroit Red Wings	1–3	Nashville Predators	Gaylord Entertainment Center	Recap
No scoring		First period	18:23 – sh – David Legwand (1); 19:45 – Adam Hall (2)
No scoring		Second period	No scoring
Brett Hull (1) – 05:21		Third period	16:03 – Scott Hartnell (1)
Manny Legace 18 saves / 21 shots		Goalie stats	Tomas Vokoun 41 saves / 42 shots

April 13	Detroit Red Wings	0–3	Nashville Predators	Gaylord Entertainment Center	Recap
No scoring		First period	10:44 – Steve Sullivan (1)
No scoring		Second period	14:21 – Vladimir Orszagh (2)
No scoring		Third period	02:04 – Greg Johnson (1)
Manny Legace 8 saves / 11 shots Curtis Joseph 9 saves / 9 shots		Goalie stats	Tomas Vokoun 41 saves / 41 shots

April 15	Nashville Predators	1–4	Detroit Red Wings	Joe Louis Arena	Recap
No scoring		First period	03:19 – Henrik Zetterberg (1); 06:22 – Brett Hull (2); 13:18 – sh – Brendan Shanahan (1)
Sergei Zholtok (1) – pp – 19:22		Second period	09:25 – pp – Nicklas Lidstrom (1)
No scoring		Third period	No scoring
Tomas Vokoun 27 saves / 31 shots		Goalie stats	Curtis Joseph 19 saves / 20 shots

April 17	Detroit Red Wings	2–0	Nashville Predators	Gaylord Entertainment Center	Recap
Ray Whitney (1) – 01:26; Steve Yzerman (1) – 01:56		First period	No scoring
No scoring		Second period	No scoring
No scoring		Third period	No scoring
Curtis Joseph 15 saves / 15 shots		Goalie stats	Tomas Vokoun 24 saves / 26 shots

Detroit won series 4–2

==== (2) San Jose Sharks vs. (7) St. Louis Blues ====
San Jose entered the playoffs as the Pacific Division champions, earning the second seed in the Western Conference with 104 points. St. Louis qualified as the seventh seed earning 91 points (winning the tiebreaker over Nashville by having more wins) during the regular season. This was the third playoff series between these two teams; they split the two previous meetings. They last met in the 2001 Western Conference quarterfinals where St. Louis won in six games. San Jose won this year's four game regular season series earning five of eight points during the season.

San Jose defeated the Blues in five games. Game one saw a defensive battle with San Jose winning the game 1–0, on the strength of a 26-save shutout from Evgeni Nabokov. Chris Osgood was equally strong in net for the Blues, but allowed a goal to Niko Dimitrakos in the first overtime. Nabokov gave up only one goal in game two, a 3–1 Sharks victory highlighted by Patrick Marleau's hat-trick. In game three the Blues used home-ice advantage to post a 4–1 victory getting a hat-trick from Mike Sillinger. The next night, in game four, saw a back-and-forth game that ultimately went to San Jose 4–3. With a chance to knock out the Blues at home in game five the Sharks did just that, winning 3–1.

Shortly after the series, St. Louis left winger Mike Danton, was arrested, charged and convicted in a conspiracy to murder his agent, David Frost. It was later revealed the hitman he hired was meant for his father.

April 8	St. Louis Blues	0–1	OT	San Jose Sharks	HP Pavilion	Recap
No scoring		First period		No scoring
No scoring		Second period		No scoring
No scoring		Third period		No scoring
No scoring		First overtime period		09:16 – Niko Dimitrakos (1)
Chris Osgood 28 saves / 29 shots		Goalie stats		Evgeni Nabokov 26 saves / 26 shots

April 10	St. Louis Blues	1–3	San Jose Sharks	HP Pavilion	Recap
No scoring		First period	17:29 – pp – Patrick Marleau (1)
No scoring		Second period	03:52 – pp – Patrick Marleau (2)
Doug Weight (1) – sh – 17:51		Third period	00:48 – sh – Patrick Marleau (3)
Chris Osgood 13 saves / 16 shots Reinhard Divis 8 saves / 8 shots		Goalie stats	Evgeni Nabokov 25 saves / 26 shots

April 12	San Jose Sharks	1–4	St. Louis Blues	Savvis Center	Recap
No scoring		First period	No scoring
No scoring		Second period	09:56 – Mike Sillinger (1); 17:24 – Dallas Drake (1)
Jonathan Cheechoo (1) – 05:36		Third period	07:51 – Mike Sillinger (2); 19:13 – sh-en – Mike Sillinger (3)
Evgeni Nabokov 25 saves / 28 shots		Goalie stats	Chris Osgood 19 saves / 20 shots

April 13	San Jose Sharks	4–3	St. Louis Blues	Savvis Center	Recap
Scott Thornton (1) – 06:29		First period	11:25 – Mike Danton (1)
Scott Thornton (2) – 03:35; Alexander Korolyuk (1) – 10:04		Second period	No scoring
Alexander Korolyuk (2) – pp – 11:19		Third period	00:34 – Pavol Demitra (1); 15:07 – pp – Doug Weight (2)
Evgeni Nabokov 22 saves / 25 shots		Goalie stats	Chris Osgood 20 saves / 24 shots

April 15	St. Louis Blues	1–3	San Jose Sharks	HP Pavilion	Recap
Brian Savage (1) – 13:10		First period	01:50 – Brad Stuart (1)
No scoring		Second period	09:34 – Mark Smith (1)
No scoring		Third period	16:22 – Mike Ricci (1)
Chris Osgood 17 saves / 20 shots		Goalie stats	Evgeni Nabokov 21 saves / 22 shots

San Jose won series 4–1

==== (3) Vancouver Canucks vs. (6) Calgary Flames ====
The Vancouver Canucks entered the playoffs as the Northwest Division champions, earning the third seed in the Western Conference with 101 points. Calgary qualified as the sixth seed earning 94 points during the regular season. This was the sixth playoff meeting between these two rivals with Calgary winning three of the five previous series, they last met in the 1994 Western Conference quarterfinals, with the Canucks winning in seven games. The Flames qualified for the playoffs for the first time since 1996. Vancouver won the season series earning seven of twelve points during this year's six game regular season series.

The Flames eliminated the Canucks in seven games and won their first playoff series since winning the Stanley Cup in 1989. Vancouver scored four times on the power-play in game one as they took the opening game 5–3. Calgary scored two goals 50 seconds apart in the first period of game two in a 2–1 victory. In game three Dan Cloutier was injured in the first period and backup Johan Hedberg replaced him, Matt Cooke scored early in the third period as Vancouver won the game 2–1. Calgary goaltender Miikka Kiprusoff recorded a shutout in game four as the Flames won 4–0. In game five Alexander Auld became the third goaltender to play for Vancouver in the series, the Canucks lost the game 2–1. Vancouver stormed out to a 4–0 lead only to see the Flames come back to tie the game in the third period, Brendan Morrison scored 2:28 into the third overtime period in a 5–4 Vancouver victory. Jarome Iginla and Matt Cooke each scored twice in regulation in game seven, and Martin Gelinas scored 1:25 into overtime as Calgary won the game 3–2.

April 7	Calgary Flames	3–5	Vancouver Canucks	General Motors Place	Recap
No scoring		First period	02:34 – pp – Martin Rucinsky (1); 05:24 – pp – Sami Salo (1)
Chris Simon (1) – pp – 04:38; Oleg Saprykin (1) – pp – 05:06		Second period	12:47 – pp – Henrik Sedin (1); 17:51 – Mattias Ohlund (1)
Krzysztof Oliwa (1) – 06:16		Third period	05:26 – pp – Brendan Morrison (1)
Miikka Kiprusoff 17 saves / 22 shots		Goalie stats	Dan Cloutier 26 saves / 29 shots

April 9	Calgary Flames	2–1	Vancouver Canucks	General Motors Place	Recap
Jarome Iginla (1) – 03:06; Matthew Lombardi (1) – 03:56		First period	No scoring
No scoring		Second period	09:41 – pp – Markus Naslund (1)
No scoring		Third period	No scoring
Miikka Kiprusoff 25 saves / 26 shots		Goalie stats	Dan Cloutier 22 saves / 24 shots

April 11	Vancouver Canucks	2–1	Calgary Flames	Pengrowth Saddledome	Recap
No scoring		First period	No scoring
Markus Naslund (2) – pp – 02:10		Second period	01:04 – Chris Simon (2)
Matt Cooke (1) – 01:29		Third period	No scoring
Dan Cloutier 11 saves / 11 shots Johan Hedberg 19 saves / 20 shots		Goalie stats	Miikka Kiprusoff 23 saves / 25 shots

April 13	Vancouver Canucks	0–4	Calgary Flames	Pengrowth Saddledome	Recap
No scoring		First period	No scoring
No scoring		Second period	00:58 – sh – Stephane Yelle (1); 16:06 – pp – Chris Clark (1); 16:33 – Shean Donovan (1)
No scoring		Third period	18:13 – en – Jarome Iginla (2)
Johan Hedberg 28 saves / 31 shots		Goalie stats	Miikka Kiprusoff 20 saves / 20 shots

April 15	Calgary Flames	2–1	Vancouver Canucks	General Motors Place	Recap
No scoring		First period	No scoring
Craig Conroy (1) – pp – 03:50		Second period	16:19 – pp – Henrik Sedin (2)
Jarome Iginla (3) – 05:37		Third period	No scoring
Miikka Kiprusoff 32 saves / 33 shots		Goalie stats	Alex Auld 18 saves / 20 shots

April 17	Vancouver Canucks	5–4	3OT	Calgary Flames	Pengrowth Saddledome	Recap
Jarkko Ruutu (1) – 18:01		First period		No scoring
Daniel Sedin (1) – pp – 05:32; Brad May (1) – 06:42; Geoff Sanderson (1) – 10:15		Second period		10:31 – Oleg Saprykin (2); 12:38 – Ville Nieminen (1)
No scoring		Third period		01:14 – Martin Gelinas (1); 12:56 – Chris Clark (2)
Brendan Morrison (2) – 02:28		Third overtime period		No scoring
Alex Auld 36 saves / 40 shots		Goalie stats		Miikka Kiprusoff 47 saves / 52 shots

April 19	Calgary Flames	3–2	OT	Vancouver Canucks	General Motors Place	Recap
No scoring		First period		No scoring
Jarome Iginla (4) – 12:50		Second period		No scoring
Jarome Iginla (5) – pp – 10:14		Third period		07:32 – Matt Cooke (2); 19:54 – Matt Cooke (3)
Martin Gelinas (2) – pp – 01:25		First overtime period		No scoring
Miikka Kiprusoff 26 saves / 28 shots		Goalie stats		Alex Auld 25 saves / 28 shots

Calgary won series 4–3

==== (4) Colorado Avalanche vs. (5) Dallas Stars ====
The Colorado Avalanche entered the playoffs as the fourth seed in the Western Conference with 100 points. Dallas qualified as the fifth seed earning 97 points during the regular season. This was the third playoff meeting between these two teams, with Dallas having won both previous series. They last met in the 2000 Western Conference Final where Dallas won in seven games. Colorado won three of the four games during this year's regular season series.

The Avalanche defeated Dallas in five games. David Aebischer made 37 saves in a 3–1 Colorado victory in game one. The Avalanche scored three times on the power-play in game two winning the game by a score of 5–2. Dallas came back from a two-goal deficit in game three and won the game 4–3 in overtime on a goal by Steve Ott to climb back into the series. Dallas heavily out-shot the Avalanche in game four, but Marek Svatos won the game for Colorado 5:18 into the second overtime. After allowing the first goal in game five Colorado scored five unanswered goals to eliminate the Stars with a 5–1 victory.

April 7	Dallas Stars	1–3	Colorado Avalanche	Pepsi Center	Recap
No scoring		First period	06:14 – Peter Forsberg (1); 08:37 – Alex Tanguay (1)
No scoring		Second period	No scoring
Niko Kapanen (1) – 13:30		Third period	03:49 – Joe Sakic (1)
Marty Turco 22 saves / 25 shots		Goalie stats	David Aebischer 37 saves / 38 shots

April 9	Dallas Stars	2–5	Colorado Avalanche	Pepsi Center	Recap
Mike Modano (1) – pp – 08:33		First period	09:36 – pp – Joe Sakic (2); 19:57 – pp – Alex Tanguay (2)
Chris Therien (1) – 17:19		Second period	06:48 – Peter Forsberg (2); 13:42 – sh – Dan Hinote (1)
No scoring		Third period	03:01 – pp – Steve Konowalchuk (1)
Marty Turco 22 saves / 27 shots		Goalie stats	David Aebischer 19 saves / 21 shots

April 12	Colorado Avalanche	3–4	OT	Dallas Stars	American Airlines Center	Recap
Milan Hejduk (1) – 11:34; Riku Hahl (1) – 15:37		First period		08:01 – pp – Jason Arnott (1)
Steve Konowalchuk (2) – pp – 11:02		Second period		19:58 – pp – Scott Young (1)
No scoring		Third period		15:33 – Phillippe Boucher (1)
No scoring		First overtime period		02:11 – Steve Ott (1)
David Aebischer 28 saves / 32 shots		Goalie stats		Marty Turco 14 saves / 17 shots

April 14	Colorado Avalanche	3–2	2OT	Dallas Stars	American Airlines Center	Recap
Milan Hejduk (2) – pp – 09:10; Joe Sakic (3) – sh – 14:01		First period		15:05 – pp – Sergei Zubov (1)
No scoring		Second period		No scoring
No scoring		Third period		11:14 – Pierre Turgeon (1)
Marek Svatos (1) – 05:18		Second overtime period		No scoring
David Aebischer 41 saves / 43 shots		Goalie stats		Marty Turco 18 saves / 21 shots

April 17	Dallas Stars	1–5	Colorado Avalanche	Pepsi Center	Recap
Chris Therien (2) – 05:39		First period	18:57 – Darby Hendrickson (1)
No scoring		Second period	01:41 – pp – Steve Konowalchuk (3)
No scoring		Third period	00:42 – Peter Forsberg (3); 09:08 – Milan Hejduk (3); 15:04 – en – Joe Sakic (4)
Marty Turco 25 saves / 29 shots		Goalie stats	David Aebischer 21 saves / 22 shots

Colorado won series 4–1

== Conference semifinals ==
=== Eastern Conference semifinals ===
==== (1) Tampa Bay Lightning vs. (7) Montreal Canadiens ====
This was the first playoff meeting between these two teams. The teams split this year's four game regular season series.

The Lightning swept the Canadiens in four games. Lightning goaltender Nikolai Khabibulin recorded his fourth shutout of the post-season in a 4–0 game one victory. Vincent Lecavalier scored twice in game two as Tampa Bay won the game by a score of 3–1. Montreal was unable to hang on to a late lead in game three as Vincent Lecavalier tied the game in the final minute of regulation and Brad Richards scored 65 seconds into overtime as the Lightning won 4–3. Brad Richards scored his second game-winning goal of the series in the second period of game four as the Lightning closed out the Canadiens with a 3–1 victory.

April 23	Montreal Canadiens	0–4	Tampa Bay Lightning	St. Pete Times Forum	Recap
No scoring		First period	No scoring
No scoring		Second period	02:52 – Ruslan Fedotenko (3); 16:43 – Vincent Lecavalier (1)
No scoring		Third period	03:49 – Vincent Lecavalier (2); 07:20 – Dmitri Afanasenkov (1)
Jose Theodore 24 saves / 28 shots Mathieu Garon 6 saves / 6 shots		Goalie stats	Nikolai Khabibulin 21 saves / 21 shots

April 25	Montreal Canadiens	1–3	Tampa Bay Lightning	St. Pete Times Forum	Recap
Saku Koivu (3) – pp – 16:40		First period	02:35 – pp – Vincent Lecavalier (3); 08:33 – Fredrik Modin (4)
No scoring		Second period	19:57 – Vincent Lecavalier (4)
No scoring		Third period	No scoring
Jose Theodore 26 saves / 29 shots		Goalie stats	Nikolai Khabibulin 26 saves / 27 shots

April 27	Tampa Bay Lightning	4–3	OT	Montreal Canadiens	Bell Centre	Recap
No scoring		First period		No scoring
Cory Stillman (1) – sh – 08:41; Brad Richards (2) – pp – 12:24		Second period		09:33 – pp – Alexei Kovalev (6)
Vincent Lecavalier (5) – 19:43		Third period		10:32 – Michael Ryder (1); 16:13 – Patrice Brisebois (2)
Brad Richards (3) – 01:05		First overtime period		No scoring
Nikolai Khabibulin 28 saves / 31 shots		Goalie stats		Jose Theodore 24 saves / 28 shots

April 29	Tampa Bay Lightning	3–1	Montreal Canadiens	Bell Centre	Recap
No scoring		First period	05:46 – Niklas Sundstrom (1)
Dan Boyle (1) – pp – 11:57; Brad Richards (4) – 17:14		Second period	No scoring
Fredrik Modin (5) – en – 19:04		Third period	No scoring
Nikolai Khabibulin 27 saves / 28 shots		Goalie stats	Jose Theodore 21 saves / 23 shots

Tampa Bay won series 4–0

==== (3) Philadelphia Flyers vs. (4) Toronto Maple Leafs ====
This was the sixth playoff meeting between these two teams with Philadelphia winning four of the five previous series. They last met in the previous year's Eastern Conference quarterfinals where Philadelphia won in seven games. Philadelphia won three of the four games in this year's regular season series.

The Flyers defeated Toronto in six games. Marcus Ragnarsson broke the tie in the second period of game one as the Flyers eventually won the game 3–1. Philadelphia scored twice with the man advantage in game two as the Flyers held on for a 2–1 victory. Toronto used three second period goals to earn a 4–1 victory in game three. Maple Leafs captain Mats Sundin scored twice in game four as Toronto won 3–1. Flyers captain Keith Primeau recorded a hat trick and added an assist in a dominating 7–2 Flyers victory in game five. Philadelphia goaltender Robert Esche made just one save in the game while earning the victory, he was replaced by Sean Burke at the start of the second period due to injury. Toronto overcame a 2–0 third period deficit to force overtime in game six, however the comeback came up short as Jeremy Roenick scored the series-winning goal at 7:39 of the first overtime period.

April 22	Toronto Maple Leafs	1–3	Philadelphia Flyers	Wachovia Center	Recap
Alexander Mogilny (1) – 14:28		First period	07:14 – Tony Amonte (2)
No scoring		Second period	05:11 – Marcus Ragnarsson (1)
No scoring		Third period	15:35 – Simon Gagne (2)
Ed Belfour 23 saves / 26 shots		Goalie stats	Robert Esche 22 saves / 23 shots

April 25	Toronto Maple Leafs	1–2	Philadelphia Flyers	Wachovia Center	Recap
No scoring		First period	17:57 – pp – Donald Brashear (1)
Tie Domi (2) – 13:48		Second period	No scoring
No scoring		Third period	08:25 – pp – Alexei Zhamnov (4)
Ed Belfour 22 saves / 24 shots		Goalie stats	Robert Esche 26 saves / 27 shots

April 28	Philadelphia Flyers	1–4	Toronto Maple Leafs	Air Canada Centre	Recap
No scoring		First period	No scoring
Tony Amonte (3) – pp – 18:58		Second period	05:12 – Alexander Mogilny (2); 06:42 – Alexei Ponikarovsky (1); 15:11 – Chad Kilger (2)
No scoring		Third period	11:36 – pp – Darcy Tucker (1)
Robert Esche 25 saves / 29 shots		Goalie stats	Ed Belfour 18 saves / 19 shots

April 30	Philadelphia Flyers	1–3	Toronto Maple Leafs	Air Canada Centre	Recap
Simon Gagne (3) – 07:44		First period	13:24 – Mats Sundin (2)
No scoring		Second period	07:45 – Mats Sundin (3)
No scoring		Third period	02:19 – Darcy Tucker (2)
Robert Esche 28 saves / 31 shots		Goalie stats	Ed Belfour 28 saves / 29 shots

May 2	Toronto Maple Leafs	2–7	Philadelphia Flyers	Wachovia Center	Recap
Joe Nieuwendyk (6) – pp – 19:25		First period	03:51 – Mark Recchi (2); 05:43 – Michal Handzus (1); 18:54 – sh – Keith Primeau (3)
Gary Roberts (4) – 09:54		Second period	00:44 – Keith Primeau (4); 03:54 – Branko Radivojevic (1); 07:03 – Michal Handzus (2)
No scoring		Third period	03:50 – Keith Primeau (5)
Ed Belfour 12 saves / 18 shots Trevor Kidd 10 saves / 11 shots		Goalie stats	Robert Esche 1 save / 2 shots Sean Burke 8 saves / 9 shots

May 4	Philadelphia Flyers	3–2	OT	Toronto Maple Leafs	Air Canada Centre	Recap
Radovan Somik (1) – 09:55; Jeremy Roenick (3) – 15:30		First period		No scoring
No scoring		Second period		No scoring
No scoring		Third period		09:04 – Karel Pilar (1); 15:08 – Mats Sundin (4)
Jeremy Roenick (4) – 07:39		First overtime period		No scoring
Robert Esche 34 saves / 36 shots		Goalie stats		Ed Belfour 22 saves / 25 shots

Philadelphia won series 4–2

=== Western Conference semifinals ===
==== (1) Detroit Red Wings vs. (6) Calgary Flames ====
This was the second playoff meeting between these two teams with Detroit winning the only previous series. They last met in the 1978 Preliminary Round where Detroit won in two games against the Atlanta Flames. Detroit won three of the four games during this year's regular season series.

The Flames defeated the Red Wings in six games. Miikka Kiprusoff made 28 saves and Marcus Nilson scored the game-winning goal 2:39 into overtime as the Flames took the opening game of the series 2–1. The Red Wings bounced back with a 5–2 victory in game two led by Steve Yzerman's two goals in the second period. Jiri Fischer tied the game halfway through the second period of game three, however Flames forward Shean Donovan scored just 40 seconds later and put the Flames up for good as Calgary registered a 3–2 victory. Mathieu Dandenault broke the tie in the third period of game four as Detroit bounced back with a 4–2 victory. During the second period of game five a shot by Red Wings defenceman Mathieu Schneider deflected off a stick and struck Red Wings captain Steve Yzerman in the left eye. Yzerman was attended to for several minutes and then helped off the ice holding a towel to his face, Yzerman did not return to the series. Calgary goaltender Miikka Kiprusoff shutout the Red Wings with a 31-save performance in a 1–0 victory. In game six, Miikka Kiprusoff continued his shutout streak against the Red Wings. With just 47 seconds left in the first overtime Flames forward Martin Gelinas scored on Curtis Joseph and Calgary won their second-straight 1–0 game. This was the Flames' second-straight overtime victory to clinch a series in this playoff year.

April 22	Calgary Flames	2–1	OT	Detroit Red Wings	Joe Louis Arena	Recap
No scoring		First period		No scoring
Robyn Regehr (1) – 17:57		Second period		06:14 – Robert Lang (3)
No scoring		Third period		No scoring
Marcus Nilson (1) – 02:39		First overtime period		No scoring
Miikka Kiprusoff 28 saves / 29 shots		Goalie stats		Curtis Joseph 16 saves / 18 shots

April 24	Calgary Flames	2–5	Detroit Red Wings	Joe Louis Arena	Recap
No scoring		First period	No scoring
Shean Donovan (2) – 13:50		Second period	03:02 – pp – Tomas Holmstrom (1); 10:06 – Steve Yzerman (2); 12:19 – Steve Yzerman (3)
Martin Gelinas (3) – 18:50		Third period	14:49 – pp – Brett Hull (3); 16:08 – pp – Nicklas Lidstrom (2)
Miikka Kiprusoff 27 saves / 32 shots		Goalie stats	Curtis Joseph 14 saves / 16 shots

April 27	Detroit Red Wings	2–3	Calgary Flames	Pengrowth Saddledome	Recap
No scoring		First period	No scoring
Robert Lang (4) – 01:17; Jiri Fischer (1) – 11:44		Second period	03:38 – Stephane Yelle (2); 05:46 – pp – Jarome Iginla (6); 12:24 – Shean Donovan (3)
No scoring		Third period	No scoring
Curtis Joseph 24 saves / 27 shots		Goalie stats	Miikka Kiprusoff 27 saves / 29 shots

April 29	Detroit Red Wings	4–2	Calgary Flames	Pengrowth Saddledome	Recap
Kirk Maltby (1) – 00:26		First period	No scoring
Boyd Devereaux (1) – 03:00		Second period	05:45 – Martin Gelinas (4); 06:03 – Ville Nieminen (2)
Mathieu Dandenault (1) – 10:02; Henrik Zetterberg (2) – en – 19:36		Third period	No scoring
Curtis Joseph 25 saves / 27 shots		Goalie stats	Miikka Kiprusoff 25 saves / 28 shots

May 1	Calgary Flames	1–0	Detroit Red Wings	Joe Louis Arena	Recap
No scoring		First period	No scoring
Craig Conroy (2) – 16:07		Second period	No scoring
No scoring		Third period	No scoring
Miikka Kiprusoff 31 saves / 31 shots		Goalie stats	Curtis Joseph 20 saves / 21 shots

May 3	Detroit Red Wings	0–1	OT	Calgary Flames	Pengrowth Saddledome	Recap
No scoring		First period		No scoring
No scoring		Second period		No scoring
No scoring		Third period		No scoring
No scoring		First overtime period		19:13 – Martin Gelinas (5)
Curtis Joseph 43 saves / 44 shots		Goalie stats		Miikka Kiprusoff 38 saves / 38 shots

Calgary won series 4–2

==== (2) San Jose Sharks vs. (4) Colorado Avalanche ====
This was the third playoff meeting between these two teams with Colorado winning both previous series. They last met in the 2002 Western Conference semifinals where Colorado won in seven games. Colorado won the season series earning five of eight points during this year's four game regular season series.

San Jose defeated Colorado in six games as the Sharks advanced to the conference finals for the first time in franchise history. Patrick Marleau scored a hat-trick in a 5–2 Sharks victory in game one. In game two, Marleau scored late in the second period to put the Sharks up for good as they defeated the Avalanche in a 4–1 victory. San Jose goaltender Evgeni Nabokov posted a 33-save shutout in game three and Vincent Damphousse scored the only goal in a 1–0 San Jose victory. Joe Sakic scored the lone goal of the game 5:15 into the first overtime period in game four as Colorado extended the series with a 1–0 victory. For the second consecutive game overtime was required in game five and Joe Sakic scored the game-winning goal 1:54 into the first overtime, giving Colorado a 2–1 victory. With his second goal in game five, Joe Sakic equaled Maurice Richard for the most career playoff overtime goals with six. San Jose scored three times in just over ten minutes in the second period of game six to eliminate the Avalanche in a 3–1 win.

April 22	Colorado Avalanche	2–5	San Jose Sharks	HP Pavilion	Recap
No scoring		First period	10:52 – Patrick Marleau (4); 12:42 – Vincent Damphousse (1); 19:07 – pp – Scott Hannan (1)
Steve Konowalchuk (4) – pp – 09:07		Second period	11:39 – Patrick Marleau (5); 13:13 – Patrick Marleau (6)
Peter Forsberg (4) – pp – 00:52		Third period	No scoring
David Aebischer 12 saves / 17 shots Tommy Salo 7 saves / 7 shots		Goalie stats	Evgeni Nabokov 26 saves / 28 shots

April 24	Colorado Avalanche	1–4	San Jose Sharks	HP Pavilion	Recap
Milan Hejduk (4) – 07:01		First period	No scoring
No scoring		Second period	11:14 – pp – Vincent Damphousse (2); 19:36 – Patrick Marleau (7)
No scoring		Third period	06:27 – pp – Jonathan Cheechoo (2); 19:05 – en – Wayne Primeau (1)
David Aebischer 20 saves / 23 shots		Goalie stats	Evgeni Nabokov 20 saves / 21 shots

April 26	San Jose Sharks	1–0	Colorado Avalanche	Pepsi Center	Recap
No scoring		First period	No scoring
No scoring		Second period	No scoring
Vincent Damphousse (3) – 08:59		Third period	No scoring
Evgeni Nabokov 33 saves / 33 shots		Goalie stats	David Aebischer 16 saves / 17 shots

April 28	San Jose Sharks	0–1	OT	Colorado Avalanche	Pepsi Center	Recap
No scoring		First period		No scoring
No scoring		Second period		No scoring
No scoring		Third period		No scoring
No scoring		First overtime period		05:15 – Joe Sakic (5)
Evgeni Nabokov 35 saves / 36 shots		Goalie stats		David Aebischer 27 saves / 27 shots

May 1	Colorado Avalanche	2–1	OT	San Jose Sharks	HP Pavilion	Recap
No scoring		First period		19:52 – pp – Vincent Damphousse (4)
No scoring		Second period		No scoring
Joe Sakic (6) – 09:50		Third period		No scoring
Joe Sakic (7) – 01:54		First overtime period		No scoring
David Aebischer 21 saves / 22 shots		Goalie stats		Evgeni Nabokov 16 saves / 18 shots

May 4	San Jose Sharks	3–1	Colorado Avalanche	Pepsi Center	Recap
No scoring		First period	No scoring
Vincent Damphousse (5) – 01:34; Marcel Goc (1) – 08:59; Jonathan Cheechoo (3) – 12:03		Second period	17:34 – pp – Milan Hejduk (5)
No scoring		Third period	No scoring
Evgeni Nabokov 28 saves / 29 shots		Goalie stats	David Aebischer 30 saves / 33 shots

San Jose won series 4–2

== Conference finals ==
=== Eastern Conference final ===
==== (1) Tampa Bay Lightning vs. (3) Philadelphia Flyers ====
This was the second playoff meeting between these two teams with Philadelphia winning the only previous series. They last met in the 1996 Eastern Conference quarterfinals where Philadelphia won in six games. Tampa Bay made their first appearance in a Conference Final since entering the league in the 1992–93 season, while the Flyers last made it to the conference finals in 2000, losing in seven games to the New Jersey Devils. Tampa Bay won all four games in this year's regular season series.

Tampa Bay won their first conference championship defeating the Flyers in seven games. Lightning goaltender Nikolai Khabibulin made 19 saves in a 3–1 Lightning win in game one. The Flyers scored the first six goals in game two as they won easily 6–2. Tampa Bay jumped out to an early two-goal lead in game three and eventually won by a score of 4–1. Keith Primeau scored the game-winning goal shorthanded in game four as the Flyers claimed a 3–2 victory that tied the series. The Lightning scored three times on the power-play in game five as won the game 4–2. The Flyers tied the game in the dying minutes of game six on a goal by Keith Primeau that forced overtime. Simon Gagne scored at 18:18 of the first overtime period as the Flyers gained a 5–4 victory. Fredrik Modin gave the Lightning a two-goal lead in game seven and they hung on to win the game 2–1.

May 8	Philadelphia Flyers	1–3	Tampa Bay Lightning	St. Pete Times Forum	Recap
No scoring		First period	No scoring
Michal Handzus (3) – 06:48		Second period	02:03 – Dave Andreychuk (1); 13:34 – Brad Richards (5)
No scoring		Third period	07:04 – Chris Dingman (1)
Robert Esche 14 saves / 17 shots		Goalie stats	Nikolai Khabibulin 19 saves / 20 shots

May 10	Philadelphia Flyers	6–2	Tampa Bay Lightning	St. Pete Times Forum	Recap
John LeClair (1) – 01:53; Mark Recchi (3) – pp – 08:50; Sami Kapanen (2) – sh – 11:17		First period	No scoring
Vladimir Malakhov (1) – 06:02; Michal Handzus (4) – 19:48		Second period	No scoring
Mattias Timander (2) – 03:34		Third period	10:13 – Ruslan Fedotenko (4); 17:18 – pp – Martin St. Louis (5)
Robert Esche 29 saves / 31 shots		Goalie stats	Nikolai Khabibulin 8 saves / 12 shots John Grahame 15 saves / 17 shots

May 13	Tampa Bay Lightning	4–1	Philadelphia Flyers	Wachovia Center	Recap
Cory Stillman (2) – 12:56; Ruslan Fedotenko (5) – pp – 15:20		First period	No scoring
No scoring		Second period	No scoring
Vincent Lecavalier (6) – 01:19; Brad Richards (6) – 08:20		Third period	00:36 – Keith Primeau (6)
Nikolai Khabibulin 24 saves / 25 shots		Goalie stats	Robert Esche 22 saves / 26 shots

May 15	Tampa Bay Lightning	2–3	Philadelphia Flyers	Wachovia Center	Recap
Fredrik Modin (6) – pp – 12:43		First period	16:55 – John LeClair (2); 18:20 – Mark Recchi (4)
No scoring		Second period	11:50 – sh – Keith Primeau (7)
Vincent Lecavalier (7) – pp – 19:27		Third period	No scoring
Nikolai Khabibulin 23 saves / 26 shots		Goalie stats	Robert Esche 28 saves / 30 shots

May 18	Philadelphia Flyers	2–4	Tampa Bay Lightning	St. Pete Times Forum	Recap
No scoring		First period	10:30 – pp – Ruslan Fedotenko (6)
Michal Handzus (5) – 08:56; Patrick Sharp (1) – 09:34		Second period	00:24 – pp – Brad Richards (7); 07:12 – pp – Brad Richards (8)
No scoring		Third period	19:45 – en – Tim Taylor (2)
Robert Esche 27 saves / 30 shots		Goalie stats	Nikolai Khabibulin 28 saves / 30 shots

May 20	Tampa Bay Lightning	4–5	OT	Philadelphia Flyers	Wachovia Center	Recap
Vincent Lecavalier (8) – 01:28		First period		07:23 – Simon Gagne (4); 17:01 – Keith Primeau (8)
Vincent Lecavalier (9) – 00:45; Ruslan Fedotenko (7) – 15:15; Ruslan Fedotenko (8) – pp – 17:33		Second period		12:42 – Sami Kapanen (3)
No scoring		Third period		18:11 – Keith Primeau (9)
No scoring		First overtime period		18:18 – Simon Gagne (5)
Nikolai Khabibulin 38 saves / 43 shots		Goalie stats		Robert Esche 25 saves / 29 shots

May 22	Philadelphia Flyers	1–2	Tampa Bay Lightning	St. Pete Times Forum	Recap
No scoring		First period	16:46 – pp – Ruslan Fedotenko (9)
Kim Johnsson (2) – 10:16		Second period	04:57 – Fredrik Modin (7)
No scoring		Third period	No scoring
Robert Esche 30 saves / 32 shots		Goalie stats	Nikolai Khabibulin 22 saves / 23 shots

Tampa Bay won series 4–3

=== Western Conference final ===
==== (2) San Jose Sharks vs. (6) Calgary Flames ====
This was the second playoff meeting between these two teams with San Jose winning the only previous series. They last met in the 1995 Western Conference quarterfinals where San Jose won in seven games. San Jose made their first appearance in a Conference Final since entering the league in the 1991–92 season, while the Flames last made it to the conference finals in 1989, defeating the Chicago Blackhawks in five games. The teams split this year's four game regular season series.

The Flames eliminated the Sharks in six games and they became the first Canadian team to qualify for the Stanley Cup Final in a decade. Calgary goaltender Miikka Kiprusoff made 49 saves and Steve Montador won game one for the Flames with a goal at 18:43 of the first overtime period, giving them a 4–3 victory. In game two Calgary scored two first-period goals and never looked back in a 4–1 victory. Sharks goaltender Evgeni Nabokov posted a 34 save shutout and Alex Korolyuk scored two goals late in third period in a 3–0 win in game three. The Sharks exploded for four goals in the second period of game four as they evened the series at two games apiece with a 4–2 victory. Miikka Kiprusoff shutout the Sharks in game five as the Flames won 3–0. Martin Gelinas scored his third consecutive series-winning goal for the Flames in game six giving Calgary a 3–1 victory.

May 9	Calgary Flames	4–3	OT	San Jose Sharks	HP Pavilion	Recap
Krzysztof Oliwa (2) – 09:26; Craig Conroy (3) – 19:29		First period		No scoring
No scoring		Second period		01:23 – Mike Ricci (2); 19:02 – Todd Harvey (1)
Craig Conroy (4) – 09:25		Third period		16:39 – Alexander Korolyuk (3)
Steve Montador (1) – 18:43		First overtime period		No scoring
Miikka Kiprusoff 49 saves / 52 shots		Goalie stats		Evgeni Nabokov 33 saves / 37 shots

May 11	Calgary Flames	4–1	San Jose Sharks	HP Pavilion	Recap
Marcus Nilson (2) – 00:20; Shean Donovan (4) – 10:35		First period	No scoring
No scoring		Second period	05:26 – Alyn McCauley (1)
Ville Nieminen (3) – 12:35; Jarome Iginla (7) – 13:19		Third period	No scoring
Miikka Kiprusoff 17 saves / 18 shots		Goalie stats	Evgeni Nabokov 16 saves / 20 shots

May 13	San Jose Sharks	3–0	Calgary Flames	Pengrowth Saddledome	Recap
No scoring		First period	No scoring
Vincent Damphousse (6) – 07:31		Second period	No scoring
Alexander Korolyuk (4) – 18:10; Alexander Korolyuk (5) – pp-en – 19:16		Third period	No scoring
Evgeni Nabokov 34 saves / 34 shots		Goalie stats	Miikka Kiprusoff 21 saves / 23 shots

May 16	San Jose Sharks	4–2	Calgary Flames	Pengrowth Saddledome	Recap
No scoring		First period	No scoring
Mike Rathje (1) – 02:40; Jonathan Cheechoo (4) – 08:34; Vincent Damphousse (7) – pp – 10:03; Patrick Marleau (8) – pp – 18:47		Second period	07:55 – Jarome Iginla (8)
No scoring		Third period	19:20 – pp – Chris Simon (3)
Evgeni Nabokov 27 saves / 29 shots		Goalie stats	Miikka Kiprusoff 12 saves / 16 shots Roman Turek 3 saves / 3 shots

May 17	Calgary Flames	3–0	San Jose Sharks	HP Pavilion	Recap
Jarome Iginla (9) – sh – 06:27; Marcus Nilson (3) – 08:29		First period	No scoring
Craig Conroy (5) – 12:47		Second period	No scoring
No scoring		Third period	No scoring
Miikka Kiprusoff 19 saves / 19 shots		Goalie stats	Evgeni Nabokov 18 saves / 21 shots

May 19	San Jose Sharks	1–3	Calgary Flames	Pengrowth Saddledome	Recap
No scoring		First period	18:52 – pp – Jarome Iginla (10)
Alyn McCauley (2) – 16:14		Second period	13:02 – Martin Gelinas (6)
No scoring		Third period	19:59 – en – Robyn Regehr (2)
Evgeni Nabokov 26 saves / 28 shots		Goalie stats	Miikka Kiprusoff 18 saves / 19 shots

Calgary won series 4–2

== Stanley Cup Final ==
This was the first playoff series between these two teams. Tampa Bay made their first Finals appearance, in their twelfth season, while Calgary made their third Finals appearance. The Flames won their last appearance in the Finals defeating Montreal in six games in 1989. Tampa Bay won the only game of this year's regular season series.

May 25	Calgary Flames	4–1	Tampa Bay Lightning	St. Pete Times Forum	Recap
Martin Gelinas (7) – 03:02		First period	No scoring
Jarome Iginla (11) – sh – 15:21; Stephane Yelle (3) – 18:08		Second period	No scoring
Chris Simon (4) – pp – 19:40		Third period	04:13 – pp – Martin St. Louis (6)
Miikka Kiprusoff 23 saves / 24 shots		Goalie stats	Nikolai Khabibulin 15 saves / 19 shots

May 27	Calgary Flames	1–4	Tampa Bay Lightning	St. Pete Times Forum	Recap
No scoring		First period	07:10 – Ruslan Fedotenko (10)
No scoring		Second period	No scoring
Ville Nieminen (4) – pp – 12:21		Third period	02:51 – Brad Richards (9); 04:00 – Dan Boyle (2); 05:58 – pp – Martin St. Louis (7)
Miikka Kiprusoff 27 saves / 31 shots		Goalie stats	Nikolai Khabibulin 18 saves / 19 shots

May 29	Tampa Bay Lightning	0–3	Calgary Flames	Pengrowth Saddledome	Recap
No scoring		First period	No scoring
No scoring		Second period	13:53 – pp – Chris Simon (5); 17:09 – Shean Donovan (5)
No scoring		Third period	18:28 – pp – Jarome Iginla (12)
Nikolai Khabibulin 15 saves / 18 shots		Goalie stats	Miikka Kiprusoff 21 saves / 21 shots

May 31	Tampa Bay Lightning	1–0	Calgary Flames	Pengrowth Saddledome	Recap
Brad Richards (10) – pp – 02:48		First period	No scoring
No scoring		Second period	No scoring
No scoring		Third period	No scoring
Nikolai Khabibulin 29 saves / 29 shots		Goalie stats	Miikka Kiprusoff 23 saves / 24 shots

June 3	Calgary Flames	3–2	OT	Tampa Bay Lightning	St. Pete Times Forum	Recap
Martin Gelinas (8) – pp – 02:13		First period		19:26 – Martin St. Louis (8)
Jarome Iginla (13) – 15:10		Second period		No scoring
No scoring		Third period		00:37 – pp – Fredrik Modin (8)
Oleg Saprykin (3) – 14:40		First overtime period		No scoring
Miikka Kiprusoff 26 saves / 28 shots		Goalie stats		Nikolai Khabibulin 33 saves / 36 shots

June 5	Tampa Bay Lightning	3–2	2OT	Calgary Flames	Pengrowth Saddledome	Recap
No scoring		First period		No scoring
Brad Richards (11) – pp – 04:17; Brad Richards (12) – pp – 10:52		Second period		09:05 – Chris Clark (3); 17:49 – Marcus Nilson (4)
No scoring		Third period		No scoring
Martin St. Louis (9) – 00:33		Second overtime period		No scoring
Nikolai Khabibulin 31 saves / 33 shots		Goalie stats		Miikka Kiprusoff 24 saves / 27 shots

June 7	Calgary Flames	1–2	Tampa Bay Lightning	St. Pete Times Forum	Recap
No scoring		First period	13:31 – pp – Ruslan Fedotenko (11)
No scoring		Second period	14:38 – Ruslan Fedotenko (12)
Craig Conroy (6) – pp – 09:21		Third period	No scoring
Miikka Kiprusoff 13 saves / 15 shots		Goalie stats	Nikolai Khabibulin 16 saves / 17 shots

Tampa Bay won series 4–3

== Player statistics ==
=== Skaters ===
These are the top ten skaters based on points, following the conclusion of games played on June 7. GP = Games played; G = Goals; A = Assists; Pts = Points; +/– = Plus/minus; PIM = Penalty minutes

Player	Team	GP	G	A	Pts	+/–	PIM
Brad Richards	Tampa Bay Lightning	23	12	14	26	+5	4
Martin St. Louis	Tampa Bay Lightning	23	9	15	24	+6	14
Jarome Iginla	Calgary Flames	26	13	9	22	+13	45
Fredrik Modin	Tampa Bay Lightning	23	8	11	19	+7	10
Craig Conroy	Calgary Flames	26	6	11	17	+12	12
Vincent Lecavalier	Tampa Bay Lightning	23	9	7	16	–2	25
Keith Primeau	Philadelphia Flyers	18	9	7	16	+11	22
Martin Gelinas	Calgary Flames	26	8	7	15	+10	35
Ruslan Fedotenko	Tampa Bay Lightning	22	12	2	14	0	14
Vincent Damphousse	San Jose Sharks	17	7	7	14	0	20
Alexei Zhamnov	Philadelphia Flyers	18	4	10	14	–1	8
Dave Andreychuk	Tampa Bay Lightning	23	1	13	14	–2	14

=== Goaltending ===
These are the top five goaltenders based on either goals against average or save percentage with at least four games played.

GP = Games played; W = Wins; L = Losses; SA = Shots against; GA = Goals against; GAA = Goals against average; TOI = Time On Ice (minutes:seconds); Sv% = Save percentage; SO = Shutouts

Player	Team	GP	W	L	SA	GA	GAA	TOI	Sv%	SO
Curtis Joseph	Detroit Red Wings	9	4	4	197	12	1.39	517:34	.939	1
Tomas Vokoun	Nashville Predators	6	2	4	197	12	2.02	355:44	.939	1
Evgeni Nabokov	San Jose Sharks	17	10	7	461	30	1.71	1052:15	.935	3
Nikolai Khabibulin	Tampa Bay Lightning	23	16	7	598	40	1.71	1400:30	.933	5
Ed Belfour	Toronto Maple Leafs	13	6	7	379	27	2.09	773:47	.929	3
Miikka Kiprusoff	Calgary Flames	26	15	11	710	51	1.85	1655:00	.928	5
Patrick Lalime	Ottawa Senators	7	3	4	139	13	1.96	398:22	.906	0

== See also ==
- 2003–04 NHL season
- List of NHL seasons

Preceded by 2003 Stanley Cup playoffs	Stanley Cup playoffs	Succeeded by 2006 Stanley Cup playoffs
