= Ruslan Fedotenko =

Ukrainian ice hockey player (born 1979)

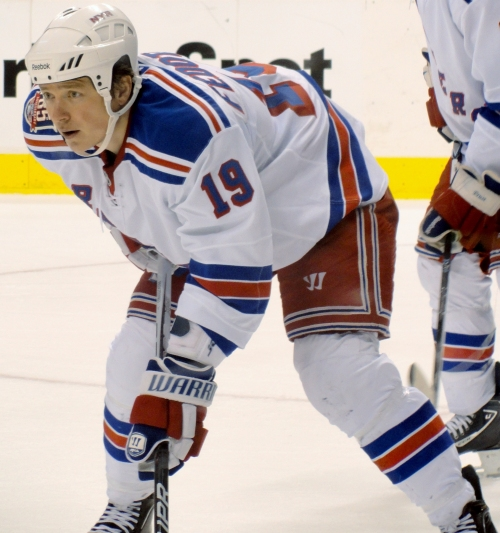
- Fedotenko with the New York Rangers in 2011
- Born: 18 January 1979 (age 47) Kiev, Ukrainian SSR, Soviet Union
- Height: 6 ft 1 in (185 cm)
- Weight: 200 lb (91 kg; 14 st 4 lb)
- Position: Left wing
- Shot: Left
- Played for: Sokil Kyiv; Philadelphia Flyers; Tampa Bay Lightning; New York Islanders; Pittsburgh Penguins; New York Rangers; Donbass Donetsk
- National team: Ukraine
- NHL draft: Undrafted
- Playing career: 1995–2016

Ruslan Viktorovych Fedotenko (Note: Ukrainian: Руслан Вікторович Федотенко, romanized: Ruslan Viktorovych Fedotenko) (born January 18, 1979) is a Ukrainian former professional ice hockey winger.

A two-time Stanley Cup champion, in his National Hockey League (NHL) career he played for the Philadelphia Flyers, Tampa Bay Lightning, New York Islanders, Pittsburgh Penguins and the New York Rangers. Internationally, Fedotenko has competed for Ukraine in the 2002 Winter Olympics.

== Playing career ==
As a youth, Fedotenko played in the 1993 Quebec International Pee-Wee Hockey Tournament with a team from Ukraine.

=== Start in the NHL ===
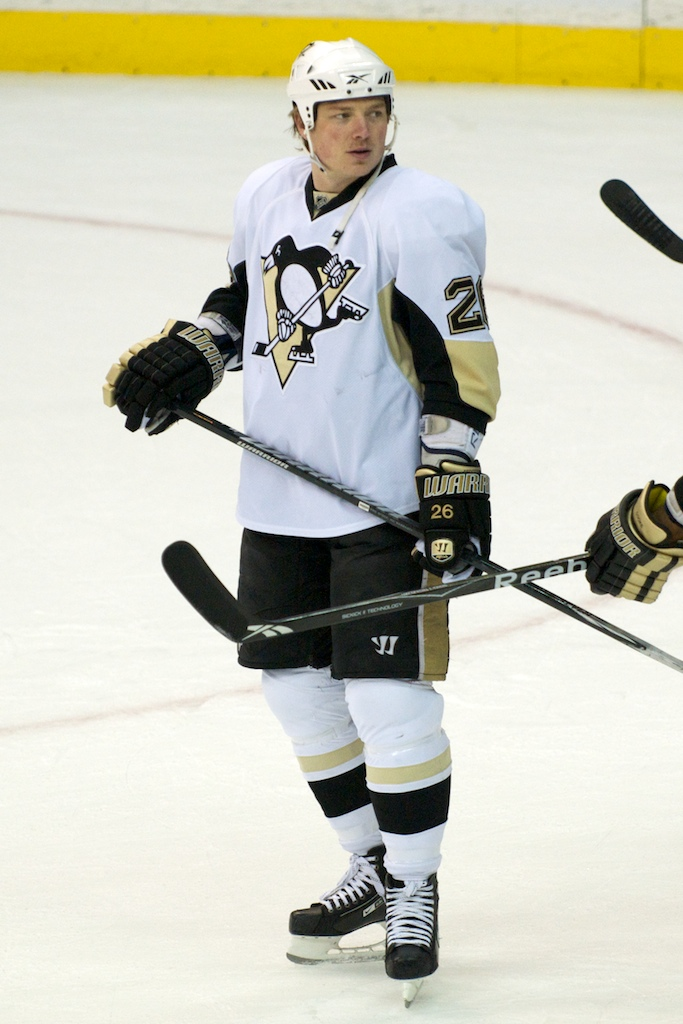
Fedotenko with the Pittsburgh Penguins.

Fedotenko was not drafted. He first entered the NHL after being signed by the Philadelphia Flyers in 1999. With the Flyers, he scored the overtime winning goal in game one of the 2002 Eastern Conference Quarter-Finals against the Ottawa Senators during the 2002 Stanley Cup Playoffs.

=== Tampa Bay Lightning and first Stanley Cup win ===
After two seasons with the Flyers, he was traded in 2002 to the Tampa Bay Lightning, along with two second-round draft picks, in exchange for Tampa Bay's first-round draft pick, which was used to draft Joni Pitkänen.

In 2004, Fedotenko won the Stanley Cup for the first time, scoring both Lightning goals in game seven of the Finals against the Calgary Flames. It was Tampa Bay's first Stanley Cup in franchise history. After a career-high 26-goal, 41-point campaign in 2005–06, Fedotenko was re-signed as a restricted free agent in July 2006 to a one-year contract worth $1.65 million.

=== New York Islanders ===
Following his fourth season in Tampa Bay, Fedotenko signed a one-year, $2.9 million contract with the New York Islanders in July 2007, joining Mike Comrie and Bill Guerin as the Islanders' free agent acquisitions. He scored 33 points in his first and only season with the Islanders.

=== Pittsburgh Penguins and second Stanley Cup win ===
The following off-season, Fedotenko signed his third consecutive one-year contract, a $2.25 million deal with Pittsburgh Penguins in July 2008. Fedotenko neared career-high totals with 39 points in 65 games, benefiting as a winger on a talented Penguins team that featured centers Sidney Crosby, Evgeni Malkin and Jordan Staal. He went on to tally 14 points in 24 post-season games with the Penguins in 2009, capturing his second career Stanley Cup as Pittsburgh defeated the Detroit Red Wings in seven games. After becoming an unrestricted free agent in July 2009, Fedotenko took a pay cut and agreed to a one-year, $1.8 million contract to remain with the Penguins.

=== New York Rangers ===
On 10 September 2010, Fedotenko accepted a try-out with the New York Rangers. After an impressive preseason, the Rangers signed Fedotenko to a one-year $1 million deal on 4 October 2010.

On 1 July 2011, Fedotenko re-signed with the Rangers, accepting a one-year, $1.4 million contract.

=== Later career ===
On 5 July 2012, Fedotenko returned to where his NHL career began and signed a one-year deal with the Philadelphia Flyers for $1.75 million. During the 2012–13 NHL lockout, Fedotenko played for the Kontinental Hockey League's HC Donbass. Following the 2012–13 NHL season, Fedotenko signed a three-year, $9 million contract with Donbass.

Due to the Russo-Ukrainian war, he returned to the United States at the conclusion of the 2013–14 KHL season.

On 20 January 2015, Fedotenko signed a professional try out contract with the Iowa Wild. To end the 2014–15 season, Fedotenko registered 3 goals in 13 games with Iowa. On 1 July 2015, Fedotenko signed as a free agent to a one-year contract with Iowa's parent affiliate, the Minnesota Wild.

On 11 October 2016, Fedotenko announced his retirement from professional hockey. Fedotenko finished his career as a two-time Stanley Cup Champion, played in a total of 863 NHL games with five different NHL teams, scored 173 goals and registered 193 assists, totaling 366 points.

== International play ==
Fedotenko has played internationally for the Ukrainian national ice hockey team, appearing in one game for his nation at the 2002 Winter Olympics in a 5–2 defeat of Switzerland.

== Career statistics ==
=== Regular season and playoffs ===
			Regular Season					Playoffs
Season	Team	League	GP	G	A	Pts	PIM	GP	G	A	Pts	PIM
1995–96	Sokil Kyiv	IHL	2	0	0	0	0	—	—	—	—	—
1995–96	Sokil Kyiv	EEHL	33	9	11	20	12	—	—	—	—	—
1996–97	TPS	FIN U18	3	3	2	5	2	—	—	—	—	—
1996–97	TPS	FIN Jr	11	1	1	2	2	—	—	—	—	—
1996–97	Turku HT	FIN III	—	—	—	—	—	3	1	0	1	2
1996–97	Kiekko-67	FIN II	22	4	3	7	16	—	—	—	—	—
1997–98	Melfort Mustangs	SJHL	68	35	31	66	55	4	0	2	2	2
1998–99	Sioux City Musketeers	USHL	55	43	34	77	139	5	5	1	6	9
1999–2000	Trenton Titans	ECHL	8	5	3	8	9	—	—	—	—	—
1999–2000	Philadelphia Phantoms	AHL	67	16	34	50	42	2	0	0	0	0
2000–01	Philadelphia Phantoms	AHL	8	1	0	1	8	—	—	—	—	—
2000–01	Philadelphia Flyers	NHL	74	16	20	36	72	6	0	1	1	4
2001–02	Philadelphia Flyers	NHL	78	17	9	26	43	5	1	0	1	2
2002–03	Tampa Bay Lightning	NHL	76	19	13	32	44	11	0	1	1	2
2003–04	Tampa Bay Lightning	NHL	77	17	22	39	30	22	12	2	14	14
2005–06	Tampa Bay Lightning	NHL	80	26	15	41	44	5	0	0	0	20
2006–07	Tampa Bay Lightning	NHL	80	12	20	32	52	4	0	0	0	4
2007–08	New York Islanders	NHL	67	16	17	33	40	—	—	—	—	—
2008–09	Pittsburgh Penguins	NHL	65	16	23	39	44	24	7	7	14	4
2009–10	Pittsburgh Penguins	NHL	80	11	19	30	50	6	0	0	0	4
2010–11	New York Rangers	NHL	66	10	15	25	25	5	0	2	2	4
2011–12	New York Rangers	NHL	73	9	11	20	16	20	2	5	7	8
2012–13	Donbass Donetsk	KHL	33	8	10	18	22	—	—	—	—	—
2012–13	Philadelphia Flyers	NHL	47	4	9	13	12	—	—	—	—	—
2013–14	Donbass Donetsk	KHL	46	7	10	17	42	13	0	6	6	35
2014–15	Iowa Wild	AHL	13	3	0	3	6	—	—	—	—	—
2015–16	Iowa Wild	AHL	16	0	4	4	8	—	—	—	—	—
NHL totals			863	173	193	366	472	108	22	18	40	66

=== International ===
Year	Team	Event	Result	GP	G	A	Pts	PIM
1996	Ukraine	EJC B	8th	5	2	1	3	0
1996	Ukraine	WJC	10th	6	0	1	1	2
1997	Ukraine	EJC	7th	6	0	2	2	4
1997	Ukraine	WJC B	15th	7	3	0	3	8
2002	Ukraine	OG	10th	1	1	0	1	4
2013	Ukraine	OGQ	DNQ	3	2	3	5	2
Senior Tier I totals				1	1	0	1	4

== Personal life ==
Fedotenko resides in Tampa, Florida, with his wife Debbie whom he met during his junior hockey career when she was his billet mom. After his retirement, he began working in construction. He is a naturalised citizen of the United States. His family in Ukraine mainly resides in Kyiv and Odesa.

He has a tattoo of two Stanley Cups on his shoulder.

In 2015, Fedotenko described the Russo-Ukrainian war as putting his career into "perspective" because he had yet to find an NHL team but "at least I'm alive and I have peace over my head versus people who I still talk to back in Donetsk who go shelter to shelter and are just trying to survive bombings." He condemned the 2022 Russian invasion of Ukraine and called the sight of tanks approaching Kyiv "mind-boggling", "surreal", and "absolutely sad".
