= 2002 Stanley Cup playoffs =

Ice hockey playoffs

Tournament details
- Dates: April 17 – June 13, 2002
- Teams: 16
- Defending champions: Colorado Avalanche

Final positions
- Champions: Detroit Red Wings
- Runners-up: Carolina Hurricanes

Tournament statistics
- Scoring leader(s): Peter Forsberg (Avalanche) (27 points)

Awards
- MVP: Nicklas Lidstrom (Red Wings)

The 2002 Stanley Cup playoffs, the playoff tournament of the National Hockey League began on April 17, 2002.

The Detroit Red Wings defeated the Carolina Hurricanes on June 13, 2002, four games to one, to win their tenth championship in their history. Carolina was in the Stanley Cup Finals for the first time in their 23-year history, which includes their tenure as the Hartford Whalers. Red Wings defenceman Nicklas Lidstrom was awarded the Conn Smythe Trophy as the MVP of the playoffs. It was the ninth championship for Red Wings coach Scotty Bowman, who announced his retirement after the deciding game of the series. The Phoenix Coyotes played their last playoff games at America West Arena and missed the playoffs until 2010, when they played in Glendale.

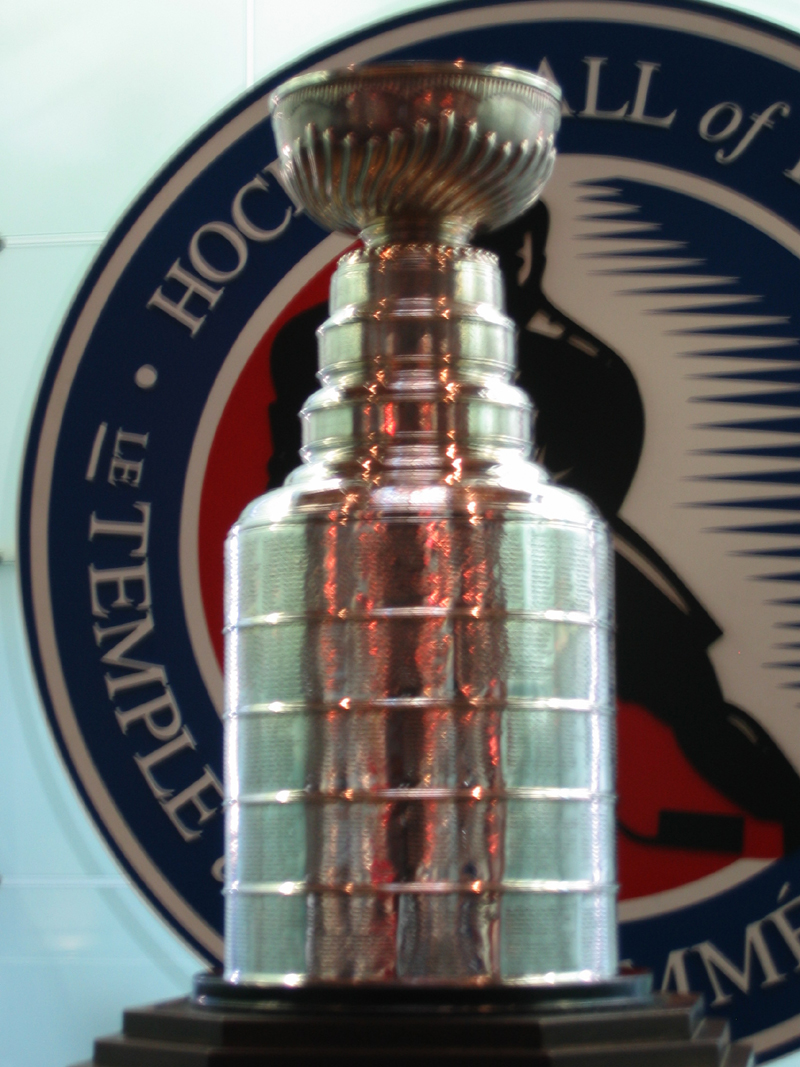
The Stanley Cup, awarded to the champion of the NHL.

The 16 teams that qualified, eight from each conference, played best-of-seven series for conference quarterfinals, semifinals and championships, and then the conference champions played a best-of-seven series for the Stanley Cup. A record 25 shutouts were recorded in the 2002 playoffs and, for the first time since 1991, not a single team was swept in a playoff series. This is the last time that all three Eastern Canada teams made the playoffs together and got past the first round. For the first time since entering the NHL, both teams from the province of Alberta, the Calgary Flames and the Edmonton Oilers missed the playoffs in the same season. In addition, the Pittsburgh Penguins missed the playoffs for the first time since 1990, while the Dallas Stars missed the playoffs for the first time since 1996

== Playoff seeds ==
The top eight teams in each conference qualified for the playoffs. The top three seeds in each conference were awarded to the division winners; while the five remaining spots were awarded to the highest finishers in their respective conferences.

The following teams qualified for the playoffs:

=== Eastern Conference ===
1. Boston Bruins, Northeast Division champions, Eastern Conference regular season champions – 101 points
2. Philadelphia Flyers, Atlantic Division champions – 97 points
3. Carolina Hurricanes, Southeast Division champions – 91 points
4. Toronto Maple Leafs – 100 points
5. New York Islanders – 96 points
6. New Jersey Devils – 95 points
7. Ottawa Senators – 94 points
8. Montreal Canadiens – 87 points

=== Western Conference ===
1. Detroit Red Wings, Central Division champions, Western Conference regular season champions, Presidents' Trophy winners – 116 points
2. Colorado Avalanche, Northwest Division champions – 99 points (45 wins)
3. San Jose Sharks, Pacific Division champions – 99 points (44 wins)
4. St. Louis Blues – 98 points
5. Chicago Blackhawks – 96 points
6. Phoenix Coyotes – 95 points (40 wins, 7 points head-to-head vs. Los Angeles)
7. Los Angeles Kings – 95 points (40 wins, 3 points head-to-head vs. Phoenix)
8. Vancouver Canucks – 94 points

== Playoff bracket ==
In each round, teams competed in a best-of-seven series following a 2–2–1–1–1 format (scores in the bracket indicate the number of games won in each best-of-seven series). The team with home ice advantage played at home for games one and two (and games five and seven, if necessary), and the other team played at home for games three and four (and game six, if necessary). The top eight teams in each conference made the playoffs, with the three division winners seeded 1–3 based on regular season record, and the five remaining teams seeded 4–8.

The NHL used "re-seeding" instead of a fixed bracket playoff system. During the first three rounds, the highest remaining seed in each conference was matched against the lowest remaining seed, the second-highest remaining seed played the second-lowest remaining seed, and so forth. The higher-seeded team was awarded home ice advantage. The two conference winners then advanced to the Stanley Cup Finals, where home ice advantage was awarded to the team that had the better regular season record.

Conference quarterfinals	Conference semifinals
1	Boston	2
8	Montreal	4
3	Carolina	4
8	Montreal	2
2	Philadelphia	1
7	Ottawa	4
Eastern Conference
3	Carolina	4
6	New Jersey	2
4	Toronto	4
7	Ottawa	3
4	Toronto	4
5	NY Islanders	3
1	Detroit	4
8	Vancouver	2
1	Detroit	4
4	St. Louis	1
2	Colorado	4
7	Los Angeles	3
Western Conference
3	San Jose	4
6	Phoenix	1
2	Colorado	4
3	San Jose	3
4	St. Louis	4
5	Chicago	1

Conference finals
3	Carolina	4
4	Toronto	2
1	Detroit	4
2	Colorado	3

Stanley Cup Finals
E3	Carolina	1
W1	Detroit	4

== Conference quarterfinals ==
=== Eastern Conference quarterfinals ===
==== (1) Boston Bruins vs. (8) Montreal Canadiens ====
The Boston Bruins finished first in the Eastern Conference during the regular season with 101 points. The Montreal Canadiens qualified as the eighth seed earning 87 points during the regular season. This was the twenty-ninth playoff series between the Bruins and the Canadiens, with Montreal winning twenty-one of the twenty-eight previous series. They last met in the 1994 Eastern Conference Quarterfinals, which Boston won in seven games.

April 18	Montreal Canadiens	5–2	Boston Bruins	FleetCenter	Recap
Saku Koivu (1) – pp – 12:55		First period	10:55 – Joe Thornton (1)
Doug Gilmour (1) – 04:44		Second period	10:30 – pp – Bill Guerin (1)
Donald Audette (1) – 02:18; Donald Audette (2) – 10:00; Gino Odjick (1) – 17:16		Third period	No scoring
Jose Theodore 30 saves / 32 shots		Goalie stats	Byron Dafoe 22 saves / 27 shots

April 21	Montreal Canadiens	4–6	Boston Bruins	FleetCenter	Recap
Richard Zednik (1) – 14:22; Richard Zednik (2) – 17:39		First period	02:12 – Brian Rolston (1); 09:34 – Glen Murray (1); 10:55 – Bill Guerin (2); 11:49 – pp – Brian Rolston (2)
Patrice Brisebois (1) – 14:01		Second period	17:42 – P. J. Axelsson (1)
Doug Gilmour (2) – 15:06		Third period	19:26 – en – Joe Thornton (2)
Jose Theodore 38 saves / 43 shots		Goalie stats	Byron Dafoe 29 saves / 33 shots

April 23	Boston Bruins	3–5	Montreal Canadiens	Molson Centre	Recap
P. J. Axelsson (2) – sh – 08:24		First period	04:54 – pp – Yanic Perreault (1)
Bill Guerin (3) – pp – 07:54; Nick Boynton (1) – 09:04		Second period	No scoring
No scoring		Third period	07:04 – Donald Audette (3); 07:57 – Doug Gilmour (3); 11:59 – Saku Koivu (2); 19:59 – en – Joe Juneau (1)
Byron Dafoe 18 saves / 22 shots		Goalie stats	Jose Theodore 29 saves / 32 shots

April 25	Boston Bruins	5–2	Montreal Canadiens	Molson Centre	Recap
P. J. Stock (1) – 02:49; Bill Guerin (4) – pp – 15:49; Martin Lapointe (1) – pp – 17:17		First period	No scoring
Brian Rolston (3) – sh – 15:46		Second period	14:16 – pp – Richard Zednik (3)
Sergei Samsonov (1) – 14:20		Third period	07:07 – pp – Richard Zednik (4)
Byron Dafoe 26 saves / 28 shots		Goalie stats	Jose Theodore 20 saves / 25 shots

April 27	Montreal Canadiens	2–1	Boston Bruins	FleetCenter	Recap
Bill Lindsay (1) – 02:27; Oleg Petrov (1) – 15:25		First period	No scoring
No scoring		Second period	10:28 – Sergei Samsonov (2)
No scoring		Third period	No scoring
Jose Theodore 43 saves / 44 shots		Goalie stats	Byron Dafoe 11 saves / 13 shots

April 29	Boston Bruins	1–2	Montreal Canadiens	Molson Centre	Recap
Brian Rolston (4) – 07:57		First period	13:56 – pp – Donald Audette (4)
No scoring		Second period	No scoring
No scoring		Third period	00:39 – pp – Yanic Perreault (2)
Byron Dafoe 16 saves / 18 shots		Goalie stats	Jose Theodore 34 saves / 35 shots

Montreal won series 4–2

==== (2) Philadelphia Flyers vs. (7) Ottawa Senators ====
The Philadelphia Flyers entered the playoffs as the second seed in the Eastern Conference after winning the Atlantic Division with 97 points. The Ottawa Senators earned the seventh seed with 94 points. This was the first playoff series played between the two franchises. The Flyers scored two goals in this series, which is the lowest total scored by a team in a five-game series in NHL history.

April 17	Ottawa Senators	0–1	OT	Philadelphia Flyers	First Union Center	Recap
No scoring		First period		No scoring
No scoring		Second period		No scoring
No scoring		Third period		No scoring
No scoring		First overtime period		07:47 – Ruslan Fedotenko (1)
Patrick Lalime 23 saves / 24 shots		Goalie stats		Roman Cechmanek 35 saves / 35 shots

April 20	Ottawa Senators	3–0	Philadelphia Flyers	First Union Center	Recap
No scoring		First period	No scoring
Daniel Alfredsson (1) – 09:32		Second period	No scoring
Mike Fisher (1) – 03:53; Jody Hull (1) – 15:57		Third period	No scoring
Patrick Lalime 33 saves / 33 shots		Goalie stats	Roman Cechmanek 23 saves / 26 shots

April 22	Philadelphia Flyers	0–3	Ottawa Senators	Corel Centre	Recap
No scoring		First period	No scoring
No scoring		Second period	No scoring
No scoring		Third period	02:04 – pp – Radek Bonk (1); 19:05 – en – Marian Hossa (1); 19:50 – en – Daniel Alfredsson (2)
Roman Cechmanek 28 saves / 29 shots		Goalie stats	Patrick Lalime 26 saves / 26 shots

April 24	Philadelphia Flyers	0–3	Ottawa Senators	Corel Centre	Recap
No scoring		First period	19:40 – Wade Redden (1)
No scoring		Second period	06:06 – Sami Salo (1); 08:08 – Marian Hossa (2)
No scoring		Third period	No scoring
Roman Cechmanek 16 saves / 19 shots Brian Boucher 6 saves / 6 shots		Goalie stats	Patrick Lalime 28 saves / 28 shots

April 26	Ottawa Senators	2–1	OT	Philadelphia Flyers	First Union Center	Recap
Daniel Alfredsson (3) – pp – 15:16		First period		03:53 – pp – Dan McGillis (1)
No scoring		Second period		No scoring
No scoring		Third period		No scoring
Martin Havlat (1) – pp – 07:33		First overtime period		No scoring
Patrick Lalime 25 saves / 26 shots		Goalie stats		Brian Boucher 25 saves / 27 shots

Ottawa won series 4–1

==== (3) Carolina Hurricanes vs. (6) New Jersey Devils ====
The Carolina Hurricanes entered the playoffs as the Southeast Division champions earning the third seed in the Eastern Conference with 91 points. The New Jersey Devils earned the sixth seed with 95 points. Although New Jersey finished the season with a better overall record and a higher point total, Carolina won their division, so they were automatically placed in the top three seeds in the conference and were granted home-ice advantage. This was the second playoff series between these two teams, with the only previous meeting being the 2001 Eastern Conference Quarterfinals where New Jersey won in six games.

The Hurricanes knocked off the Devils in six games, winning their first playoff series since relocating from Hartford.

April 17	New Jersey Devils	1–2	Carolina Hurricanes	Raleigh Entertainment & Sports Arena	Recap
No scoring		First period	08:21 – pp – Rod Brind'Amour (1); 09:43 – Erik Cole (1)
No scoring		Second period	No scoring
Patrik Elias (1) – pp – 07:31		Third period	No scoring
Martin Brodeur 15 saves / 17 shots		Goalie stats	Arturs Irbe 34 saves / 35 shots

April 19	New Jersey Devils	1–2	OT	Carolina Hurricanes	Raleigh Entertainment & Sports Arena	Recap
No scoring		First period		No scoring
Bobby Holik (1) – 00:37		Second period		15:05 – pp – Erik Cole (2)
No scoring		Third period		No scoring
No scoring		First overtime period		15:26 – Bates Battaglia (1)
Martin Brodeur 26 saves / 28 shots		Goalie stats		Arturs Irbe 30 saves / 31 shots

April 21	Carolina Hurricanes	0–4	New Jersey Devils	Continental Airlines Arena	Recap
No scoring		First period	07:48 – Brian Gionta (1); 09:25 – pp – Brian Rafalski (1)
No scoring		Second period	00:58 – pp – Bobby Holik (2); 02:17 – pp – Brian Rafalski (2)
No scoring		Third period	No scoring
Arturs Irbe 9 saves / 12 shots Kevin Weekes 22 saves / 23 shots		Goalie stats	Martin Brodeur 16 saves / 16 shots

April 23	Carolina Hurricanes	1–3	New Jersey Devils	Continental Airlines Arena	Recap
No scoring		First period	01:16 – Bobby Holik (3); 17:31 – sh – Brian Gionta (2)
No scoring		Second period	No scoring
Aaron Ward (1) – 17:23		Third period	06:23 – pp – Brian Rafalski (3)
Arturs Irbe 6 saves / 8 shots Kevin Weekes 13 saves / 14 shots		Goalie stats	Martin Brodeur 23 saves / 24 shots

April 24	New Jersey Devils	2–3	OT	Carolina Hurricanes	Raleigh Entertainment & Sports Arena	Recap
No scoring		First period		No scoring
Bobby Holik (4) – 11:30		Second period		13:44 – Martin Gelinas (1)
Patrik Elias (2) – pp – 11:46		Third period		18:31 – pp – Jeff O'Neill (1)
No scoring		First overtime period		08:16 – Josef Vasicek (1)
Martin Brodeur 35 saves / 38 shots		Goalie stats		Kevin Weekes 40 saves / 42 shots

April 27	Carolina Hurricanes	1–0	New Jersey Devils	Continental Airlines Arena	Recap
No scoring		First period	No scoring
Ron Francis (1) – pp – 10:29		Second period	No scoring
No scoring		Third period	No scoring
Kevin Weekes 32 saves / 32 shots		Goalie stats	Martin Brodeur 21 saves / 22 shots

Carolina won series 4–2

==== (4) Toronto Maple Leafs vs. (5) New York Islanders ====
The Toronto Maple Leafs entered the playoffs as the fourth seed in the Eastern Conference with 100 points. The New York Islanders earned the fifth seed with 96 points. This was the third playoff series between these two teams, the teams split the previous two playoff series. They last met in the 1981 Preliminary Round where New York won in three games.

April 18	New York Islanders	1–3	Toronto Maple Leafs	Air Canada Centre	Recap
Kenny Jonsson (1) – pp – 05:57		First period	No scoring
No scoring		Second period	No scoring
No scoring		Third period	04:03 – Darcy Tucker (1); 08:39 – Tie Domi (1); 19:20 – en – Mats Sundin (1)
Chris Osgood 28 saves / 30 shots		Goalie stats	Curtis Joseph 13 saves / 14 shots

April 20	New York Islanders	0–2	Toronto Maple Leafs	Air Canada Centre	Recap
No scoring		First period	No scoring
No scoring		Second period	No scoring
No scoring		Third period	03:10 – Alyn McCauley (1); 19:53 – en – Tomas Kaberle (1)
Chris Osgood 24 saves / 25 shots		Goalie stats	Curtis Joseph 31 saves / 31 shots

April 23	Toronto Maple Leafs	1–6	New York Islanders	Nassau Coliseum	Recap
Alexander Mogilny (1) – 07:32		First period	14:34 – pp – Mark Parrish (1)
No scoring		Second period	06:01 – pp – Brad Isbister (1); 13:33 – Michael Peca (1); 19:19 – pp – Mark Parrish (2)
No scoring		Third period	04:07 – pp – Shawn Bates (1); 04:21 – Dave Scatchard (1)
Curtis Joseph 33 saves / 39 shots Corey Schwab 5 saves / 5 shots		Goalie stats	Chris Osgood 34 saves / 35 shots

April 24	Toronto Maple Leafs	3–4	New York Islanders	Nassau Coliseum	Recap
Alexander Mogilny (2) – pp – 19:44		First period	10:30 – Alexei Yashin (1)
Tomas Kaberle (2) – 19:19		Second period	No scoring
Shayne Corson (1) – 16:34		Third period	13:16 – pp – Kip Miller (1); 14:56 – Roman Hamrlik (1); 17:30 – ps – Shawn Bates (2)
Curtis Joseph 19 saves / 23 shots		Goalie stats	Chris Osgood 22 saves / 25 shots

April 26	New York Islanders	3–6	Toronto Maple Leafs	Air Canada Centre	Recap
Kip Miller (2) – pp – 19:48		First period	06:29 – Garry Valk (1); 09:34 – Jonas Hoglund (1)
Trent Hunter (1) – 16:39		Second period	07:05 – pp – Bryan McCabe (1); 14:30 – Bryan McCabe (2); 17:18 – Darcy Tucker (2)
Adrian Aucoin (1) – pp – 13:51		Third period	11:05 – pp – Jonas Hoglund (2)
Chris Osgood 11 saves / 15 shots Garth Snow 17 saves / 19 shots		Goalie stats	Curtis Joseph 16 saves / 19 shots

April 28	Toronto Maple Leafs	3–5	New York Islanders	Nassau Coliseum	Recap
Wade Belak (1) – 14:23; Jonas Hoglund (3) – pp – 16:42		First period	05:07 – pp – Mariusz Czerkawski (1); 13:26 – Alexei Yashin (2)
No scoring		Second period	01:35 – pp – Adrian Aucoin (2)
Gary Roberts (1) – pp – 06:41		Third period	03:11 – Kip Miller (3); 03:49 – Mariusz Czerkawski (2)
Curtis Joseph 29 saves / 34 shots		Goalie stats	Chris Osgood 31 saves / 34 shots

April 30	New York Islanders	2–4	Toronto Maple Leafs	Air Canada Centre	Recap
Alexei Yashin (3) – pp – 03:41		First period	13:27 – Gary Roberts (2)
No scoring		Second period	02:37 – Alexander Mogilny (3); 13:48 – Travis Green (1)
Kip Miller (4) – 04:23		Third period	19:20 – en – Alexander Mogilny (4)
Chris Osgood 26 saves / 29 shots		Goalie stats	Curtis Joseph 31 saves / 33 shots

Toronto won series 4–3

=== Western Conference quarterfinals ===
==== (1) Detroit Red Wings vs. (8) Vancouver Canucks ====
The Detroit Red Wings entered the playoffs as the President's trophy winners, the Western Conference Regular season champions and the Central Division champions with 116 points. The Vancouver Canucks entered the playoffs as the eighth seed finishing the season with 94 points. This was the first playoff series between these two teams.

The Red Wings came back from a two-game deficit and eliminated the Canucks in six games.

April 17	Vancouver Canucks	4–3	OT	Detroit Red Wings	Joe Louis Arena	Recap
No scoring		First period		17:51 – Luc Robitaille (1)
Todd Warriner (1) – 00:21; Andrew Cassels (1) – pp – 13:11		Second period		08:23 – pp – Sergei Fedorov (1)
Trevor Linden (1) – 10:47		Third period		01:55 – Igor Larionov (1)
Henrik Sedin (1) – 13:59		First overtime period		No scoring
Dan Cloutier 32 saves / 35 shots		Goalie stats		Dominik Hasek 22 saves / 26 shots

April 19	Vancouver Canucks	5–2	Detroit Red Wings	Joe Louis Arena	Recap
Todd Bertuzzi (1) – 10:14		First period	No scoring
Andrew Cassels (2) – 07:08; Scott Lachance (1) – 13:13		Second period	10:30 – Nicklas Lidstrom (1)
Markus Naslund (1) – 18:08; Matt Cooke (1) – en – 18:49		Third period	10:33 – pp – Steve Yzerman (1)
Dan Cloutier 34 saves / 36 shots		Goalie stats	Dominik Hasek 15 saves / 19 shots

April 21	Detroit Red Wings	3–1	Vancouver Canucks	General Motors Place	Recap
Steve Yzerman (2) – pp – 09:07		First period	No scoring
Nicklas Lidstrom (2) – 19:35		Second period	04:38 – pp – Todd Bertuzzi (2)
Brendan Shanahan (1) – 03:18		Third period	No scoring
Dominik Hasek 22 saves / 23 shots		Goalie stats	Dan Cloutier 23 saves / 26 shots

April 23	Detroit Red Wings	4–2	Vancouver Canucks	General Motors Place	Recap
Jiri Fischer (1) – 03:22; Chris Chelios (1) – pp – 10:12		First period	No scoring
No scoring		Second period	09:50 – Mattias Ohlund (1); 19:28 – pp – Matt Cooke (2)
Steve Yzerman (3) – 00:56; Kris Draper (1) – en – 19:07		Third period	No scoring
Dominik Hasek 22 saves / 24 shots		Goalie stats	Dan Cloutier 11 saves / 14 shots

April 25	Vancouver Canucks	0–4	Detroit Red Wings	Joe Louis Arena	Recap
No scoring		First period	04:02 – pp – Tomas Holmstrom (1); 13:35 – sh – Mathieu Dandenault (1); 15:32 – Boyd Devereaux (1); 18:31 – Sergei Fedorov (2)
No scoring		Second period	No scoring
No scoring		Third period	No scoring
Dan Cloutier 6 saves / 9 shots Peteris Skudra 20 saves / 21 shots		Goalie stats	Dominik Hasek 25 saves / 25 shots

April 27	Detroit Red Wings	6–4	Vancouver Canucks	General Motors Place	Recap
Tomas Holmstrom (2) – 01:05; Igor Larionov (2) – 04:23		First period	08:12 – pp – Ed Jovanovski (1); 08:56 – Henrik Sedin (2)
Nicklas Lidstrom (3) – sh – 06:40; Brett Hull (1) – sh – 07:10; Brett Hull (2) – pp – 17:39		Second period	No scoring
Brett Hull (3) – pp – 13:42		Third period	06:55 – Henrik Sedin (3); 17:02 – Matt Cooke (3)
Dominik Hasek 25 saves / 29 shots		Goalie stats	Dan Cloutier 1 save / 3 shots Peteris Skudra 21 saves / 25 shots

Detroit won series 4–2

==== (2) Colorado Avalanche vs. (7) Los Angeles Kings ====
The Colorado Avalanche entered the playoffs as the second seed in the Western Conference by winning the Northwest Division with 99 points, winning the tiebreaker with the San Jose Sharks in wins (45 to 44). The Los Angeles Kings earned 95 points during the regular season to finish seventh overall in the Western Conference, losing the tie-breaker in head-to-head points to Phoenix 7–3. This was the second playoff series between these two teams, they last met in the 2001 Western Conference Semifinals, which Colorado won in seven games.

April 18	Los Angeles Kings	3–4	Colorado Avalanche	Pepsi Center	Recap
No scoring		First period	19:51 – Alex Tanguay (1)
Bryan Smolinski (1) – pp – 10:52; Zigmund Palffy (1) – 14:20		Second period	04:22 – Steven Reinprecht (1)
Zigmund Palffy (2) – 03:25		Third period	01:06 – pp – Joe Sakic (1); 14:26 – Greg de Vries (1)
Felix Potvin 27 saves / 31 shots		Goalie stats	Patrick Roy 26 saves / 29 shots

April 20	Los Angeles Kings	3–5	Colorado Avalanche	Pepsi Center	Recap
Adam Deadmarsh (1) – 07:23; Mikko Eloranta (1) – 13:13		First period	07:01 – Joe Sakic (2); 15:37 – pp – Joe Sakic (3)
Jason Allison (1) – 08:43		Second period	11:05 – Peter Forsberg (1); 16:45 – Steven Reinprecht (2)
No scoring		Third period	08:45 – Chris Drury (1)
Felix Potvin 33 saves / 38 shots		Goalie stats	Patrick Roy 28 saves / 31 shots

April 22	Colorado Avalanche	1–3	Los Angeles Kings	Staples Center	Recap
Brad Larsen (1) – 06:01		First period	00:19 – Zigmund Palffy (3)
No scoring		Second period	00:43 – Jason Allison (2); 08:29 – Zigmund Palffy (4)
No scoring		Third period	No scoring
Patrick Roy 15 saves / 18 shots		Goalie stats	Felix Potvin 30 saves / 31 shots

April 23	Colorado Avalanche	1–0	Los Angeles Kings	Staples Center	Recap
No scoring		First period	No scoring
Steven Reinprecht (3) – 05:57		Second period	No scoring
No scoring		Third period	No scoring
Patrick Roy 32 saves / 32 shots		Goalie stats	Felix Potvin 24 saves / 25 shots

April 25	Los Angeles Kings	1–0	OT	Colorado Avalanche	Pepsi Center	Recap
No scoring		First period		No scoring
No scoring		Second period		No scoring
No scoring		Third period		No scoring
Craig Johnson (1) – 02:19		First overtime period		No scoring
Felix Potvin 26 saves / 26 shots		Goalie stats		Patrick Roy 22 saves / 23 shots

April 27	Colorado Avalanche	1–3	Los Angeles Kings	Staples Center	Recap
No scoring		First period	01:21 – Jason Allison (3); 06:44 – Brad Chartrand (1)
Riku Hahl (1) – 09:37		Second period	06:19 – Bryan Smolinski (2)
No scoring		Third period	No scoring
Patrick Roy 17 saves / 20 shots		Goalie stats	Felix Potvin 23 saves / 24 shots

April 29	Los Angeles Kings	0–4	Colorado Avalanche	Pepsi Center	Recap
No scoring		First period	No scoring
No scoring		Second period	05:08 – Chris Drury (2); 06:02 – Alex Tanguay (2); 17:32 – Steven Reinprecht (4)
No scoring		Third period	16:47 – en – Adam Foote (1)
Felix Potvin 23 saves / 26 shots Jamie Storr 0 saves / 0 shots		Goalie stats	Patrick Roy 23 saves / 23 shots

Colorado won series 4–3

==== (3) San Jose Sharks vs. (6) Phoenix Coyotes ====
The San Jose Sharks entered the playoffs as the Pacific Division champions earning the third seed in the Western Conference with 99 points, losing the tiebreaker with the Colorado Avalanche in wins (45 to 44). The Phoenix Coyotes earned the sixth seed with 95 points, winning the tiebreaker with the Los Angeles Kings in head-to head points (7 to 3). This was the first and to date only playoff series between these two teams.

April 17	Phoenix Coyotes	1–2	San Jose Sharks	Compaq Center	Recap
No scoring		First period	06:48 – pp – Vincent Damphousse (1)
Daniel Briere (1) – 02:53		Second period	05:02 – Patrick Marleau (1)
No scoring		Third period	No scoring
Sean Burke 25 saves / 27 shots		Goalie stats	Evgeni Nabokov 21 saves / 22 shots

April 20	Phoenix Coyotes	3–1	San Jose Sharks	Compaq Center	Recap
No scoring		First period	No scoring
Daymond Langkow (1) – 05:31		Second period	No scoring
Daniel Briere (2) – pp – 01:39; Shane Doan (1) – 14:59		Third period	14:19 – Marco Sturm (1)
Sean Burke 27 saves / 28 shots		Goalie stats	Evgeni Nabokov 20 saves / 23 shots

April 22	San Jose Sharks	4–1	Phoenix Coyotes	America West Arena	Recap
No scoring		First period	01:06 – Shane Doan (2)
Patrick Marleau (2) – 03:40; Adam Graves (1) – 05:38		Second period	No scoring
Scott Thornton (1) – 07:20; Mike Ricci (1) – 07:43		Third period	No scoring
Evgeni Nabokov 35 saves / 36 shots		Goalie stats	Sean Burke 31 saves / 35 shots

April 24	San Jose Sharks	2–1	Phoenix Coyotes	America West Arena	Recap
Mike Rathje (1) – pp – 12:23; Mike Ricci (2) – 14:39		First period	No scoring
No scoring		Second period	09:27 – Radoslav Suchy (1)
No scoring		Third period	No scoring
Evgeni Nabokov 29 saves / 30 shots		Goalie stats	Sean Burke 22 saves / 24 shots

April 26	Phoenix Coyotes	1–4	San Jose Sharks	Compaq Center	Recap
No scoring		First period	No scoring
Mike Johnson (1) – ps – 19:45		Second period	10:24 – Patrick Marleau (3); 13:24 – Adam Graves (2)
No scoring		Third period	05:20 – Vincent Damphousse (2); 15:24 – Marco Sturm (2)
Sean Burke 15 saves / 19 shots		Goalie stats	Evgeni Nabokov 22 saves / 23 shots

San Jose won series 4–1

==== (4) St. Louis Blues vs. (5) Chicago Blackhawks ====
The St. Louis Blues entered the playoffs as the fourth seed in the Western Conference with 98 points. The Chicago Blackhawks earned the fifth seed with 96 points. This was the tenth playoff meeting between these two teams; with Chicago winning seven of the nine previous series. They last met in the 1993 Norris Division Semifinals, where the Blues swept the series in four games. Chicago won this year's five-game regular season series earning seven of ten points.

April 18	Chicago Blackhawks	2–1	St. Louis Blues	Savvis Center	Recap
No scoring		First period	No scoring
Kyle Calder (1) – 02:42		Second period	01:34 – pp – Pavol Demitra (1)
Alexander Karpovtsev (1) – 16:50		Third period	No scoring
Jocelyn Thibault 34 saves / 35 shots		Goalie stats	Brent Johnson 19 saves / 21 shots

April 20	Chicago Blackhawks	0–2	St. Louis Blues	Savvis Center	Recap
No scoring		First period	02:53 – pp – Doug Weight (1)
No scoring		Second period	No scoring
No scoring		Third period	12:48 – Scott Mellanby (1)
Jocelyn Thibault 23 saves / 25 shots		Goalie stats	Brent Johnson 26 saves / 26 shots

April 21	St. Louis Blues	4–0	Chicago Blackhawks	United Center	Recap
Jamal Mayers (1) – 01:48; Scott Mellanby (2) – pp – 13:26		First period	No scoring
Pavol Demitra (2) – pp – 01:03; Scott Young (1) – sh – 19:10		Second period	No scoring
No scoring		Third period	No scoring
Brent Johnson 12 saves / 12 shots		Goalie stats	Jocelyn Thibault 13 saves / 17 shots Steve Passmore 6 saves / 6 shots

April 23	St. Louis Blues	1–0	Chicago Blackhawks	United Center	Recap
No scoring		First period	No scoring
Pavol Demitra (3) – 18:43		Second period	No scoring
No scoring		Third period	No scoring
Brent Johnson 27 saves / 27 shots		Goalie stats	Steve Passmore 24 saves / 25 shots

April 25	Chicago Blackhawks	3–5	St. Louis Blues	Savvis Center	Recap
No scoring		First period	19:43 – pp – Scott Mellanby (3)
Steve Thomas (1) – 04:34; Kyle Calder (2) – pp – 12:43; Steve Sullivan (1) – 13:03		Second period	14:21 – Scott Young (2); 19:57 – Chris Pronger (1)
No scoring		Third period	06:23 – Jamal Mayers (2); 15:56 – Keith Tkachuk (1)
Steve Passmore 26 saves / 31 shots		Goalie stats	Brent Johnson 32 saves / 35 shots

St. Louis won series 4–1

== Conference semifinals ==
=== Eastern Conference semifinals ===
==== (3) Carolina Hurricanes vs. (8) Montreal Canadiens ====
This was the sixth playoff series between the two teams; with Montreal winning all five previous playoff series. They last met in the 1992 Adams Division Semifinals where Montreal defeated the Hartford Whalers in seven games. The teams split this year's four-game regular season series.

May 3	Montreal Canadiens	0–2	Carolina Hurricanes	Raleigh Entertainment & Sports Arena	Recap
No scoring		First period	No scoring
No scoring		Second period	No scoring
No scoring		Third period	03:49 – Ron Francis (2); 17:42 – Erik Cole (3)
Jose Theodore 26 saves / 28 shots		Goalie stats	Kevin Weekes 19 saves / 19 shots

May 5	Montreal Canadiens	4–1	Carolina Hurricanes	Raleigh Entertainment & Sports Arena	Recap
Saku Koivu (3) – 07:25; Andrei Markov (1) – 16:51		First period	No scoring
Doug Gilmour (4) – pp – 01:03		Second period	19:53 – Rod Brind'Amour (2)
Bill Lindsay (2) – en – 18:49		Third period	No scoring
Jose Theodore 45 saves / 46 shots		Goalie stats	Kevin Weekes 12 saves / 15 shots

May 7	Carolina Hurricanes	1–2	OT	Montreal Canadiens	Molson Centre	Recap
No scoring		First period		No scoring
No scoring		Second period		09:03 – Saku Koivu (4)
Bates Battaglia (2) – 03:24		Third period		No scoring
No scoring		First overtime period		02:26 – Donald Audette (5)
Kevin Weekes 18 saves / 20 shots		Goalie stats		Jose Theodore 33 saves / 34 shots

May 9	Carolina Hurricanes	4–3	OT	Montreal Canadiens	Molson Centre	Recap
No scoring		First period		10:46 – Andreas Dackell (1); 11:54 – Yanic Perreault (3)
No scoring		Second period		10:55 – Sergei Berezin (1)
Sean Hill (1) – pp – 03:57; Bates Battaglia (3) – 12:43; Erik Cole (4) – 19:19		Third period		No scoring
Niclas Wallin (1) – 03:14		First overtime period		No scoring
Kevin Weekes 7 saves / 9 shots Arturs Irbe 10 saves / 11 shots		Goalie stats		Jose Theodore 36 saves / 40 shots

May 12	Montreal Canadiens	1–5	Carolina Hurricanes	Raleigh Entertainment & Sports Arena	Recap
No scoring		First period	03:17 – Martin Gelinas (2)
No scoring		Second period	02:13 – Rod Brind'Amour (3)
Karl Dykhuis (1) – 14:32		Third period	03:40 – pp – Ron Francis (3); 11:18 – Tommy Westlund (1); 16:13 – Bates Battaglia (4)
Jose Theodore 26 saves / 31 shots		Goalie stats	Arturs Irbe 30 saves / 31 shots

May 13	Carolina Hurricanes	8–2	Montreal Canadiens	Molson Centre	Recap
Erik Cole (5) – 00:25; Erik Cole (6) – 03:33; Sean Hill (2) – pp – 07:55; Josef Vasicek (2) – 14:58; Kevyn Adams (1) – 18:15		First period	19:49 – Stephane Quintal (1)
Bates Battaglia (5) – pp – 05:57; Sean Hill (3) – pp – 12:17; Jeff O'Neill (2) – 19:52		Second period	No scoring
No scoring		Third period	05:44 – pp – Donald Audette (6)
Arturs Irbe 31 saves / 33 shots		Goalie stats	Jose Theodore 8 saves / 13 shots Stephane Fiset 16 saves / 19 shots

Carolina won series 4–2

==== (4) Toronto Maple Leafs vs. (7) Ottawa Senators ====
This was the third consecutive playoff meeting and third postseason match-up between these two teams; with Toronto winning both previous series. Toronto won the previous year's Eastern Conference Quarterfinals in a four-game sweep. Ottawa won three of the five games in this year's regular season series. Before 2021, this was the most recent all-Canadian playoff series that was played after the opening round of the playoffs and to do so without an all-Canadian division realignment until 2022.

May 2	Ottawa Senators	5–0	Toronto Maple Leafs	Air Canada Centre	Recap
Martin Havlat (2) – pp – 07:44; Radek Bonk (2) – pp – 09:04; Shane Hnidy (1) – 11:44		First period	No scoring
Todd White (1) – 01:42; Daniel Alfredsson (4) – pp – 10:39		Second period	No scoring
No scoring		Third period	No scoring
Patrick Lalime 27 saves / 27 shots		Goalie stats	Curtis Joseph 28 saves / 33 shots

May 4	Ottawa Senators	2–3	3OT	Toronto Maple Leafs	Air Canada Centre	Recap
No scoring		First period		04:46 – Travis Green (2); 08:20 – Darcy Tucker (3)
Sami Salo (2) – 07:52		Second period		No scoring
Mike Fisher (2) – 02:49		Third period		No scoring
No scoring		Third overtime period		04:30 – Gary Roberts
Patrick Lalime 39 saves / 42 shots		Goalie stats		Curtis Joseph 54 saves / 56 shots

May 6	Toronto Maple Leafs	2–3	Ottawa Senators	Corel Centre	Recap
No scoring		First period	No scoring
No scoring		Second period	06:49 – Magnus Arvedson (1)
Gary Roberts (4) – 16:44; Travis Green (3) – 19:26		Third period	10:14 – Magnus Arvedson (2); 16:25 – Daniel Alfredsson (5)
Curtis Joseph 26 saves / 29 shots		Goalie stats	Patrick Lalime 26 saves / 28 shots

May 8	Toronto Maple Leafs	2–1	Ottawa Senators	Corel Centre	Recap
No scoring		First period	No scoring
Alyn McCauley (2) – 06:17; Alyn McCauley (3) – pp – 17:17		Second period	02:15 – pp – Wade Redden (2)
No scoring		Third period	No scoring
Curtis Joseph 24 saves / 25 shots		Goalie stats	Patrick Lalime 22 saves / 24 shots

May 10	Ottawa Senators	4–2	Toronto Maple Leafs	Air Canada Centre	Recap
Wade Redden (3) – 07:22		First period	19:42 – pp – Gary Roberts (5)
Marian Hossa (3) – pp – 07:13		Second period	No scoring
Daniel Alfredsson (6) – 17:59; Radek Bonk (3) – en – 19:25		Third period	12:34 – Alyn McCauley (4)
Patrick Lalime 26 saves / 28 shots		Goalie stats	Curtis Joseph 17 saves / 20 shots

May 12	Toronto Maple Leafs	4–3	Ottawa Senators	Corel Centre	Recap
Bryan McCabe (3) – pp – 13:01; Gary Roberts (6) – pp – 17:20		First period	01:05 – Marian Hossa (4); 04:39 – Daniel Alfredsson (7)
Gary Roberts (7) – 13:09		Second period	19:35 – Todd White (2)
Alexander Mogilny (5) – 04:28		Third period	No scoring
Curtis Joseph 20 saves / 23 shots		Goalie stats	Patrick Lalime 15 saves / 19 shots

May 14	Ottawa Senators	0–3	Toronto Maple Leafs	Air Canada Centre	Recap
No scoring		First period	No scoring
No scoring		Second period	11:49 – pp – Alexander Mogilny (6)
No scoring		Third period	05:14 – Alexander Mogilny (7); 14:04 – Bryan McCabe (4)
Patrick Lalime 24 saves / 27 shots		Goalie stats	Curtis Joseph 19 saves / 19 shots

Toronto won series 4–3

=== Western Conference semifinals ===
==== (1) Detroit Red Wings vs. (4) St. Louis Blues ====
This was the seventh playoff meeting between these two teams; with Detroit winning four of the six previous series. They last met in the 1998 Western Conference Semifinals, which Detroit won in six games. Detroit won this year's five-game regular season series earning seven of ten points.

May 2	St. Louis Blues	0–2	Detroit Red Wings	Joe Louis Arena	Recap
No scoring		First period	07:40 – Pavel Datsyuk (1)
No scoring		Second period	19:04 – sh – Brett Hull (4)
No scoring		Third period	No scoring
Brent Johnson 18 saves / 20 shots		Goalie stats	Dominik Hasek 23 saves / 23 shots

May 4	St. Louis Blues	2–3	Detroit Red Wings	Joe Louis Arena	Recap
No scoring		First period	02:46 – Steve Yzerman (4); 18:28 – Brett Hull (5)
No scoring		Second period	11:53 – Luc Robitaille (2)
Scott Mellanby (4) – 00:47; Scott Mellanby (5) – 19:19		Third period	No scoring
Brent Johnson 28 saves / 31 shots		Goalie stats	Dominik Hasek 35 saves / 37 shots

May 7	Detroit Red Wings	1–6	St. Louis Blues	Savvis Center	Recap
Pavel Datsyuk (2) – 06:08		First period	05:41 – Keith Tkachuk (2); 19:03 – pp – Scott Mellanby
No scoring		Second period	17:22 – pp – Keith Tkachuk (3)
No scoring		Third period	01:53 – Keith Tkachuk (4); 09:26 – sh – Pavol Demitra (4); 15:08 – Jamal Mayers (3)
Dominik Hasek 11 saves / 16 shots Manny Legace 1 save / 2 shots		Goalie stats	Brent Johnson 27 saves / 28 shots

May 9	Detroit Red Wings	4–3	St. Louis Blues	Savvis Center	Recap
Brendan Shanahan (2) – 13:33; Jiri Fischer (2) – 16:05		First period	04:24 – pp – Scott Young (3)
Tomas Holmstrom (3) – 02:35		Second period	No scoring
Steve Yzerman (5) – pp – 03:05		Third period	17:06 – pp – Scott Mellanby (7); 18:30 – Keith Tkachuk (5)
Dominik Hasek 33 saves / 36 shots		Goalie stats	Brent Johnson 19 saves / 23 shots

May 11	St. Louis Blues	0–4	Detroit Red Wings	Joe Louis Arena	Recap
No scoring		First period	No scoring
No scoring		Second period	04:42 – Jiri Fischer (3); 09:57 – pp – Tomas Holmstrom (4)
No scoring		Third period	16:57 – Brendan Shanahan (3); 19:18 – en – Brendan Shanahan (4)
Brent Johnson 26 saves / 29 shots		Goalie stats	Dominik Hasek 16 saves / 16 shots

Detroit won series 4–1

==== (2) Colorado Avalanche vs. (3) San Jose Sharks ====
This was the second playoff meeting between these two teams. Their only previous meeting was in the 1999 Western Conference Quarterfinals, which Colorado won in six games. Colorado won this year's four-game regular season series earning five of eight points.

May 1	San Jose Sharks	6–3	Colorado Avalanche	Pepsi Center	Recap
Mike Ricci (3) – 06:13; Teemu Selanne (1) – 10:35		First period	No scoring
Teemu Selanne (2) – 11:28		Second period	14:33 – pp – Chris Drury (3); 17:57 – Greg de Vries (2)
Patrick Marleau (4) – 12:34; Scott Thornton (2) – 15:20; Bryan Marchment (1) – en – 19:54		Third period	16:33 – Peter Forsberg (2)
Evgeni Nabokov 27 saves / 30 shots		Goalie stats	Patrick Roy 17 saves / 22 shots

May 4	San Jose Sharks	2–8	Colorado Avalanche	Pepsi Center	Recap
No scoring		First period	08:54 – Rob Blake (1)
Patrick Marleau (5) – 15:09		Second period	01:38 – Rob Blake (2); 08:36 – Peter Forsberg (3); 10:19 – pp – Joe Sakic (8); 13:50 – Greg de Vries (3)
Stephane Matteau (1) – 03:30		Third period	10:21 – pp – Milan Hejduk (1); 11:59 – Eric Messier (1); 12:11 – Dan Hinote (1)
Evgeni Nabokov 20 saves / 28 shots Miikka Kiprusoff 2 saves / 2 shots		Goalie stats	Patrick Roy 29 saves / 31 shots

May 6	Colorado Avalanche	4–6	San Jose Sharks	Compaq Center	Recap
Rob Blake (3) – 00:59		First period	14:40 – Scott Thornton (3)
Rob Blake (4) – 08:56; Alex Tanguay (3) – pp – 15:49; Peter Forsberg (4) – 18:49		Second period	03:20 – Owen Nolan (1); 05:36 – Adam Graves (3)
No scoring		Third period	03:31 – pp – Teemu Selanne (3); 13:26 – pp – Patrick Marleau (6); 19:44 – en – Owen Nolan (2)
Patrick Roy 34 saves / 39 shots		Goalie stats	Evgeni Nabokov 29 saves / 33 shots

May 8	Colorado Avalanche	4–1	San Jose Sharks	Compaq Center	Recap
Rob Blake (5) – 05:26; Joe Sakic (5) – 12:36		First period	No scoring
No scoring		Second period	00:29 – pp – Teemu Selanne (4)
Joe Sakic (6) – 02:45; Milan Hejduk (2) – en – 18:58		Third period	No scoring
Patrick Roy 19 saves / 20 shots		Goalie stats	Evgeni Nabokov 21 saves / 24 shots

May 11	San Jose Sharks	5–3	Colorado Avalanche	Pepsi Center	Recap
No scoring		First period	No scoring
Marco Sturm (3) – 12:07; Niklas Sundstrom (1) – 15:38		Second period	13:40 – Peter Forsberg (5); 14:57 – Mike Keane (1); 18:05 – Joe Sakic (7)
Mike Ricci (4) – 05:59; Teemu Selanne (5) – 09:04; Owen Nolan (3) – en – 19:57		Third period	No scoring
Evgeni Nabokov 18 saves / 21 shots		Goalie stats	Patrick Roy 22 saves / 26 shots

May 13	Colorado Avalanche	2–1	OT	San Jose Sharks	Compaq Center	Recap
No scoring		First period		No scoring
Steven Reinprecht (5) – 15:41		Second period		15:17 – Marcus Ragnarsson (1)
No scoring		Third period		No scoring
Peter Forsberg (6) – 02:47		First overtime period		No scoring
Patrick Roy 21 saves / 22 shots		Goalie stats		Evgeni Nabokov 27 saves / 29 shots

May 15	San Jose Sharks	0–1	Colorado Avalanche	Pepsi Center	Recap
No scoring		First period	No scoring
No scoring		Second period	17:50 – Peter Forsberg (7)
No scoring		Third period	No scoring
Evgeni Nabokov 22 saves / 23 shots		Goalie stats	Patrick Roy 27 saves / 27 shots

Colorado won series 4–3

== Conference finals ==
=== Eastern Conference final ===
==== (3) Carolina Hurricanes vs. (4) Toronto Maple Leafs ====
This was the first playoff meeting between these two teams. The Hurricanes advanced to the Conference Finals for the first time in their 23rd season (fifth in Carolina) after entering the league in 1979 as the Hartford Whalers. This was Toronto's fourth appearance in the Conference Finals, they last appeared in the Conference Finals in 1999, which they lost to the Buffalo Sabres in five games. These teams split their four-game regular season series.

The Hurricanes defeated the Maple Leafs in six games. Martin Gelinas' overtime goal in Game 6 sent Carolina to the Stanley Cup Finals for the first time in franchise history. To date this series remains as the lowest scoring six-game playoff series in NHL history.

As of 2026, this is the last time the Maple Leafs have appeared in the Eastern Conference Finals.

May 16	Toronto Maple Leafs	2–1	Carolina Hurricanes	Raleigh Entertainment & Sports Arena	Recap
Alexander Mogilny (8) – 07:02		First period	03:23 – pp – Jeff O'Neill (3)
Jonas Hoglund (4) – pp – 12:45		Second period	No scoring
No scoring		Third period	No scoring
Curtis Joseph 31 saves / 32 shots		Goalie stats	Arturs Irbe 22 saves/ 24 shots

May 19	Toronto Maple Leafs	1–2	OT	Carolina Hurricanes	Raleigh Entertainment & Sports Arena	Recap
No scoring		First period		No scoring
No scoring		Second period		No scoring
Alyn McCauley (5) – 19:52		Third period		07:31 – Bret Hedican (1)
No scoring		First overtime period		13:42 – Niclas Wallin (2)
Curtis Joseph 31 saves / 33 shots		Goalie stats		Arturs Irbe 26 saves / 27 shots

May 21	Carolina Hurricanes	2–1	OT	Toronto Maple Leafs	Air Canada Centre	Recap
Ron Francis (4) – pp – 05:15		First period		No scoring
No scoring		Second period		19:26 – pp – Bryan McCabe (5)
No scoring		Third period		No scoring
Jeff O'Neill (4) – 06:01		First overtime period		No scoring
Arturs Irbe 20 saves / 21 shots		Goalie stats		Curtis Joseph 15 saves / 17 shots

May 23	Carolina Hurricanes	3–0	Toronto Maple Leafs	Air Canada Centre	Recap
Jaroslav Svoboda (1) – pp – 19:32		First period	No scoring
No scoring		Second period	No scoring
Sami Kapanen (1) – 11:41; Ron Francis (5) – pp – 17:35		Third period	No scoring
Arturs Irbe 31 saves / 31 shots		Goalie stats	Curtis Joseph 12 saves / 15 shots

May 25	Toronto Maple Leafs	1–0	Carolina Hurricanes	Raleigh Entertainment & Sports Arena	Recap
Darcy Tucker (4) – pp – 18:32		First period	No scoring
No scoring		Second period	No scoring
No scoring		Third period	No scoring
Curtis Joseph 27 saves / 27 shots		Goalie stats	Arturs Irbe 18 saves / 19 shots

May 28	Carolina Hurricanes	2–1	OT	Toronto Maple Leafs	Air Canada Centre	Recap
No scoring		First period		No scoring
No scoring		Second period		No scoring
Jeff O'Neill (5) – 09:36		Third period		19:38 – Mats Sundin (2)
Martin Gelinas (3) – 08:05		First overtime period		No scoring
Arturs Irbe 35 saves / 36 shots		Goalie stats		Curtis Joseph 33 saves / 35 shots

Carolina won series 4–2

=== Western Conference final ===
==== (1) Detroit Red Wings vs. (2) Colorado Avalanche ====
This was the fifth playoff meeting between these two teams, with Colorado winning three of the four previous series. They last met in the 2000 Western Conference Semifinals with Colorado winning in five games. This was Detroit's seventh Conference Finals appearance. They last went to the Western Conference Final in 1998, where they defeated the Dallas Stars in six games. This was Colorado's fourth consecutive and eighth appearance in the Conference Finals. They last went to the Western Conference Final in the previous year, which they won against the St. Louis Blues in five games. Detroit won three of the four games in this year's regular season series.

The Red Wings narrowly defeated the Avalanche in seven games to return to the Finals for the fourth time in the last seven years. The seventh game of the series is the most one-sided game seven score in NHL history and it started a streak of what is currently seven consecutive losses in game sevens for the Avalanche.

May 18	Colorado Avalanche	3–5	Detroit Red Wings	Joe Louis Arena	Recap
Joe Sakic (8) – pp – 02:48		First period	18:48 – pp – Tomas Holmstrom (5)
Milan Hejduk (3) – 13:36		Second period	16:29 – Brett Hull (6)
Alex Tanguay (4) – pp – 18:00		Third period	01:18 – Darren McCarty (1); 12:44 – Darren McCarty (2); 15:55 – Darren McCarty (3)
Patrick Roy 25 saves / 30 shots		Goalie stats	Dominik Hasek 24 saves / 27 shots

May 20	Colorado Avalanche	4–3	OT	Detroit Red Wings	Joe Louis Arena	Recap
Alex Tanguay (5) – pp – 02:59		First period		09:37 – Boyd Devereaux (2)
Peter Forsberg (8) – 07:33		Second period		14:08 – sh – Kirk Maltby (1)
Greg de Vries (4) – 05:26		Third period		13:25 – pp – Nicklas Lidstrom (4)
Chris Drury (4) – 02:17		First overtime period		No scoring
Patrick Roy 30 saves / 33 shots		Goalie stats		Dominik Hasek 22 saves / 26 shots

May 22	Detroit Red Wings	2–1	OT	Colorado Avalanche	Pepsi Center	Recap
No scoring		First period		15:54 – Rob Blake (6)
No scoring		Second period		No scoring
Luc Robitaille (3) – 05:20		Third period		No scoring
Fredrik Olausson (1) – 12:44		First overtime period		No scoring
Dominik Hasek 20 saves / 21 shots		Goalie stats		Patrick Roy 40 saves / 42 shots

May 25	Detroit Red Wings	2–3	Colorado Avalanche	Pepsi Center	Recap
No scoring		First period	07:50 – Steven Reinprecht (6)
Sergei Fedorov (3) – sh – 06:20		Second period	No scoring
Brett Hull (7) – 19:57		Third period	00:45 – Joe Sakic (9); 16:43 – Chris Drury (5)
Dominik Hasek 19 saves / 22 shots		Goalie stats	Patrick Roy 31 saves / 33 shots

May 27	Colorado Avalanche	2–1	OT	Detroit Red Wings	Joe Louis Arena	Recap
Steven Reinprecht (7) – 17:11		First period		No scoring
No scoring		Second period		No scoring
No scoring		Third period		00:54 – pp – Steve Yzerman (6)
Peter Forsberg (9) – 06:24		First overtime period		No scoring
Patrick Roy 26 saves / 27 shots		Goalie stats		Dominik Hasek 27 saves / 29 shots

May 29	Detroit Red Wings	2–0	Colorado Avalanche	Pepsi Center	Recap
Brendan Shanahan (5) – 19:21		First period	No scoring
Darren McCarty (4) – 13:27		Second period	No scoring
No scoring		Third period	No scoring
Dominik Hasek 24 saves / 24 shots		Goalie stats	Patrick Roy 26 saves / 28 shots

May 31	Colorado Avalanche	0–7	Detroit Red Wings	Joe Louis Arena	Recap
No scoring		First period	01:57 – Tomas Holmstrom (6); 03:17 – Sergei Fedorov (4); 10:25 – Luc Robitaille (4); 12:51 – Tomas Holmstrom (7)
No scoring		Second period	04:41 – Brett Hull (8); 06:28 – pp – Fredrik Olausson (2)
No scoring		Third period	16:09 – pp – Pavel Datsyuk (3)
Patrick Roy 10 saves / 16 shots David Aebischer 13 saves / 14 shots		Goalie stats	Dominik Hasek 19 saves / 19 shots

Detroit won series 4–3

== Stanley Cup Finals ==
This was the first playoff meeting between these two teams. Detroit made their twenty-second Finals appearance; their most recent appearance came in 1998 where they swept the Washington Capitals in four games. Carolina made their first Finals appearance in their twenty-third season since entering the league in 1979–80. The Hurricanes franchise had last played in a championship series when they were known as the New England Whalers in the WHA in 1978 where they were swept by the Winnipeg Jets. Detroit won both games in this year's regular season series.

June 4	Carolina Hurricanes	3–2	OT	Detroit Red Wings	Joe Louis Arena	Recap
No scoring		First period		15:21 – pp – Sergei Fedorov (5)
Sean Hill (4) – pp – 03:30; Jeff O'Neill (6) – 19:10		Second period		10:39 – Kirk Maltby (2)
No scoring		Third period		No scoring
Ron Francis (6) – 00:58		First overtime period		No scoring
Arturs Irbe 23 saves / 25 shots		Goalie stats		Dominik Hasek 23 saves / 26 shots

June 6	Carolina Hurricanes	1–3	Detroit Red Wings	Joe Louis Arena	Recap
Rod Brind'Amour (4) – sh – 14:47		First period	06:33 – sh – Kirk Maltby (3)
No scoring		Second period	No scoring
No scoring		Third period	14:52 – pp – Nicklas Lidstrom (5); 15:05 – Kris Draper (2)
Arturs Irbe 27 saves / 30 shots		Goalie stats	Dominik Hasek 16 saves / 17 shots

June 8	Detroit Red Wings	3–2	3OT	Carolina Hurricanes	Raleigh Entertainment & Sports Arena	Recap
No scoring		First period		14:49 – Josef Vasicek (3)
Igor Larionov (3) – 05:33		Second period		No scoring
Brett Hull (9) – 18:46		Third period		07:34 – Jeff O'Neill (7)
Igor Larionov (4) – 14:47		Third overtime period		No scoring
Dominik Hasek 41 saves/ 43 shots		Goalie stats		Arturs Irbe 50 saves / 53 shots

June 10	Detroit Red Wings	3–0	Carolina Hurricanes	Raleigh Entertainment & Sports Arena	Recap
No scoring		First period	No scoring
Brett Hull (10) – 06:32		Second period	No scoring
Igor Larionov (5) – 03:43; Brendan Shanahan (6) – 14:43		Third period	No scoring
Dominik Hasek 17 saves / 17 shots		Goalie stats	Arturs Irbe 24 saves / 27 shots

June 13	Carolina Hurricanes	1–3	Detroit Red Wings	Joe Louis Arena	Recap
No scoring		First period	No scoring
Jeff O'Neill (8) – pp – 18:50		Second period	04:07 – Tomas Holmstrom (8); 14:04 – pp – Brendan Shanahan (7)
No scoring		Third period	19:15 – en – Brendan Shanahan (8)
Arturs Irbe 24 saves / 26 shots		Goalie stats	Dominik Hasek 16 saves / 17 shots

Detroit won series 4–1

== Player statistics ==
Despite getting eliminated by the Red Wings in the Western Conference Final, Colorado forward Peter Forsberg led the playoffs in points with 18 assists and 9 goals. Brett Hull of the Detroit Red Wings led the playoffs with ten goals.

=== Skaters ===
GP = Games played; G = Goals; A = Assists; Pts = Points; +/– = Plus/minus; PIM = Penalty minutes

Player	Team	GP	G	A	Pts	+/–	PIM
Peter Forsberg	Colorado Avalanche	20	9	18	27	+8	20
Steve Yzerman	Detroit Red Wings	23	6	17	23	+4	10
Joe Sakic	Colorado Avalanche	21	9	10	19	-2	4
Brendan Shanahan	Detroit Red Wings	23	8	11	19	+5	20
Gary Roberts	Toronto Maple Leafs	19	7	12	19	+6	56
Sergei Fedorov	Detroit Red Wings	23	5	14	19	+4	20
Brett Hull	Detroit Red Wings	23	10	8	18	+1	4
Ron Francis	Carolina Hurricanes	23	6	10	16	–2	6
Nicklas Lidstrom	Detroit Red Wings	23	5	11	16	+6	2
Alyn McCauley	Toronto Maple Leafs	20	5	10	15	+3	4

=== Goaltending ===
These are the top seven goaltenders based on goals against average with at least four games played.

GP = Games played; W = Wins; L = Losses; SA = Shots against; GA = Goals against; GAA = Goals against average; Sv% = Save percentage; TOI = Time On Ice (minutes:seconds); SO = Shutouts

Player	Team	GP	W	L	SA	GA	GAA	Sv%	TOI	SO
Patrick Lalime	Ottawa Senators	12	7	5	332	18	1.39	.946	777:44	4
Kevin Weekes	Carolina Hurricanes	8	3	2	180	11	1.62	.939	407:34	2
Arturs Irbe	Carolina Hurricanes	18	10	8	480	30	1.67	.938	1078:17	1
Martin Brodeur	New Jersey Devils	6	2	4	145	9	1.42	.938	381:08	1
Roman Cechmanek	Philadelphia Flyers	4	1	3	109	7	1.85	.936	226:39	1
Brent Johnson	St. Louis Blues	10	5	5	252	18	1.83	.929	590:15	3
Dominik Hasek	Detroit Red Wings	23	16	7	562	45	1.86	.920	1454:42	6

== See also ==
- List of Stanley Cup champions
- 2001–02 NHL season
- 2002 in sports

Preceded by 2001 Stanley Cup playoffs	Stanley Cup playoffs	Succeeded by 2003 Stanley Cup playoffs
