= Greg de Vries =

Canadian ice hockey player (born 1973)

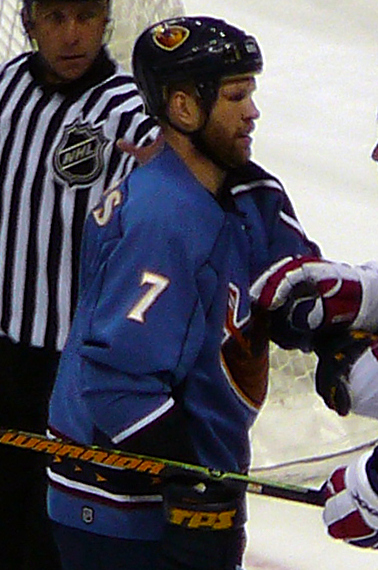
- de Vries with the Atlanta Thrashers in 2007
- Born: January 4, 1973 (age 53) Sundridge, Ontario, Canada
- Height: 6 ft 2 in (188 cm)
- Weight: 215 lb (98 kg; 15 st 5 lb)
- Position: Defence
- Shot: Left
- Played for: Edmonton Oilers; Nashville Predators; Colorado Avalanche; New York Rangers; Ottawa Senators; Atlanta Thrashers
- NHL draft: Undrafted
- Playing career: 1994–2009

Gregory de Vries (born January 4, 1973) is a Canadian former professional ice hockey player. He played over 800 games with six teams in the National Hockey League (NHL). de Vries won the Stanley Cup with the Colorado Avalanche in 2000–01 season.

== Playing career ==
de Vries grew up playing minor hockey in his hometown of Sundridge, Ontario in the OMHA's Georgian Bay-Parry Sound Minor hockey league. In Bantam, he played for the North Bay Cortina Astros AAA club in 1988–89. The following year, de Vries signed with the Aurora Eagles Jr.A. club of the OHA.

In May 1990, de Vries was drafted in the third round (35th overall) by the Niagara Falls Thunder in the Ontario Hockey League (OHL) Priority Selection. de Vries, however, decided that he would forego major junior hockey and pursue an NCAA scholarship.

The following season (1990–91), de Vries signed with the Stratford Cullitons Jr.B. club and teamed with future NHL defenceman, Chris Pronger.

In 1991–92, de Vries accepted a scholarship at Bowling Green State University (CCHA). He left BGSU for the OHL Niagara Falls Thunder in September 1992.

Undrafted, de Vries was signed by the Edmonton Oilers on March 20, 1994, as a free agent. de Vries was signed from junior team Niagara Falls Thunder of the OHL and made his professional debut at the end of the 1993–94 season with Oilers affiliate, the Cape Breton Oilers of the American Hockey League (AHL).

On October 1, 1998, de Vries was traded by the Oilers, along with Drake Berehowsky and Éric Fichaud to the Nashville Predators for Jim Dowd and Mikhail Shtalenkov, but less than a month later on October 24 was traded to the Colorado Avalanche for a second-round draft pick. He played five seasons in Colorado, becoming a fixture in the Avalanche defence and winning the Stanley Cup in 2001.

On July 14, 2003, he left the Avalanche and signed as a free agent with the New York Rangers for the 2003–04 season. de Vries however, was traded at the deadline on March 9, 2004, to the Ottawa Senators for Karel Rachunek and prospect Alexandre Giroux. While brought in to help the Senators in the playoffs, they lost in the first round.

After the 2004 NHL Lockout, he was traded by the Senators along with Marián Hossa on August 23, 2005, to the Atlanta Thrashers for Dany Heatley. de Vries' inclusion in that deal was strictly financial, as Senators' management deemed his on-ice performance was not in line with his big contract. After two seasons with the Thrashers, de Vries left as a free agent and signed with former team the Nashville Predators on July 2, 2007.

He currently resides in Stratford, Ontario with his wife, and three children.

== Career statistics ==
			Regular season					Playoffs
Season	Team	League	GP	G	A	Pts	PIM	GP	G	A	Pts	PIM
1989–90	Aurora Eagles	CJHL	42	1	16	17	32	—	—	—	—	—
1990–91	Stratford Cullitons	MWJHL	40	8	32	40	120	3	2	1	3	20
1991–92	Thorold Blackhawks	GHL	3	0	0	0	0	—	—	—	—	—
1991–92	Bowling Green State University	CCHA	24	0	3	3	20	—	—	—	—	—
1992–93	Niagara Falls Thunder	OHL	62	3	23	26	86	4	0	1	1	6
1993–94	Niagara Falls Thunder	OHL	64	5	40	45	135	—	—	—	—	—
1993–94	Cape Breton Oilers	AHL	9	0	0	0	11	1	0	0	0	0
1994–95	Cape Breton Oilers	AHL	77	5	19	24	68	—	—	—	—	—
1995–96	Cape Breton Oilers	AHL	58	9	30	39	174	—	—	—	—	—
1995–96	Edmonton Oilers	NHL	13	1	1	2	12	—	—	—	—	—
1996–97	Hamilton Bulldogs	AHL	34	4	14	18	26	—	—	—	—	—
1996–97	Edmonton Oilers	NHL	37	0	4	4	52	12	0	1	1	8
1997–98	Edmonton Oilers	NHL	65	7	4	11	80	7	0	0	0	21
1998–99	Nashville Predators	NHL	6	0	0	0	4	—	—	—	—	—
1998–99	Colorado Avalanche	NHL	67	1	3	4	60	19	0	2	2	22
1999–2000	Colorado Avalanche	NHL	69	2	7	9	73	5	0	0	0	4
2000–01	Colorado Avalanche	NHL	79	5	12	17	51	23	0	1	1	20
2001–02	Colorado Avalanche	NHL	82	8	12	20	57	21	4	9	13	2
2002–03	Colorado Avalanche	NHL	82	6	26	32	70	7	2	0	2	0
2003–04	New York Rangers	NHL	53	3	12	15	37	—	—	—	—	—
2003–04	Ottawa Senators	NHL	13	0	1	1	6	7	0	1	1	8
2005–06	Atlanta Thrashers	NHL	82	7	28	35	76	—	—	—	—	—
2006–07	Atlanta Thrashers	NHL	82	2	21	24	66	4	1	0	1	4
2007–08	Nashville Predators	NHL	77	4	11	15	71	6	1	0	1	2
2008–09	Nashville Predators	NHL	71	1	4	5	65	—	—	—	—	—
NHL totals			878	48	146	194	780	111	8	14	22	91

== Awards and honours ==
Award	Year
NHL
Stanley Cup champion	2001
