= Paul Sample =

Paul Sample may refer to:

- Paul Sample (artist) (1896–1974), American artist known for artwork depicting 20th century New England
- Paul Sample (cartoonist) (1947–2026), British cartoonist known for his strip Ogri
- Paul Sample (ice hockey) (born 1982), British ice hockey player
