= Athol Murray =

Canadian Catholic priest and educator

The Reverend Monsignor Athol Murray OC
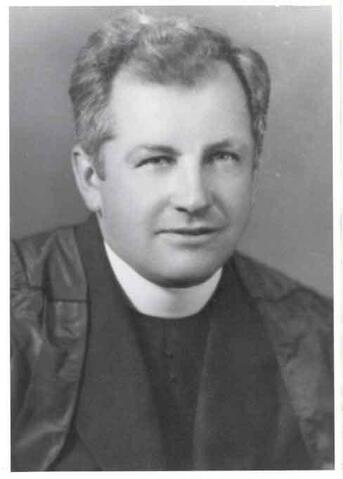
- Born: January 9, 1892; Toronto, Ontario, Canada
- Died: December 15, 1975 (aged 83)
- Awards: Order of Canada (1968); Canada's Sports Hall of Fame (1972); Hockey Hall of Fame (1998)

Ecclesiastical career
- Religion: Christianity
- Church: Roman Catholic Church
- Ordained: 1918
- Congregations served: St. Augustine's Parish, Wilcox

James Athol Murray OC (January 9, 1892 – December 15, 1975) was a Canadian Catholic priest and educator. He built a collection of shacks in Wilcox, 55 km south of Regina into a non-denominational residential college. It began as a convent school founded by the sisters of Charity in 1920.

== Biography ==
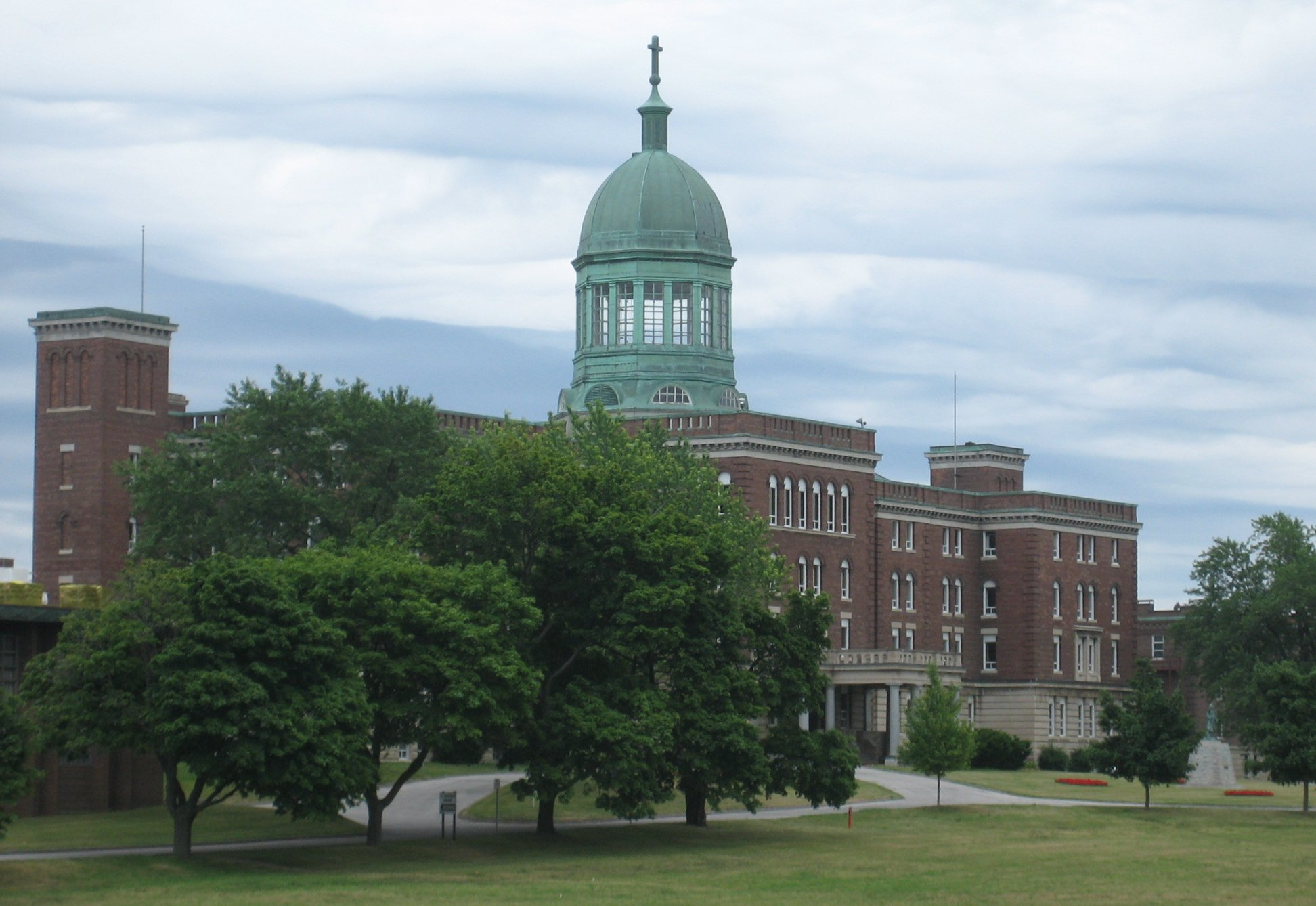
St Augustine Seminary, Scarborough, Toronto

James Athol Murray was born on January 9, 1892, in Toronto, Ontario, Canada, the son of James Peter and Nanno Hayes Murray. He was educated at Loyola College, St. Michael's College School, St. Hyacinthe College, and Université Laval. He clerked for a time in a law firm before entering St. Augustine Seminary in Toronto and was ordained in 1918. He was sent to Regina, where in 1923 he started the Regina Argos Club, an athletic club for boys. In 1927 Murray was assigned to St. Augustine's parish in Wilcox, Saskatchewan.

Murray brought fifteen boys from Regina to Wilcox where they were enrolled in residential Notre Dame School, run by the Sisters of Charity of St. Louis. He began the high school program known as Notre Dame of the Prairies College. Murray was the inspirational force behind the famous Notre Dame Hounds hockey team. Known as Père, he would never refuse a deserving student an education - even if that meant tuition was paid in potatoes and wheat rather than dollars and cents. Leading the college until his death, he influenced generations of Canadians and the development of Canadian hockey. Said Père Murray, "I love God, Canada and hockey -- not always in that order."

The ice hockey team is known as the Notre Dame Hounds. More than 100 former Hounds have been drafted by National Hockey League including Wendel Clark, Curtis Joseph, Rod Brind'Amour, Brad Richards and Vincent Lecavalier. The Hockey Saskatchewan's Athol Murray Trophy is named in his honour.

Murray played a central role in the 1962 strike by Saskatchewan doctors opposing socialized medicine and inciting violence at anti-Medicare rallys on radio broadcasts, proclaiming “This thing may break into violence and bloodshed any day now, and God help us if it doesn’t.”.

Murray was named a monsignor in 1968. He died on December 15, 1975, at the age of eighty-three.

== Honours ==
- In 1968, he was made an Officer of the Order of Canada.
- In 1972, he was inducted as a hockey builder into the Canada's Sports Hall of Fame.
- In 1998, he was posthumously inducted into the Hockey Hall of Fame.
- A historic plaque was installed at his family's Toronto home from 1905 to 1921; 445 Euclid Avenue.
- Athol Murray College of Notre Dame in Wilcox, Saskatchewan, is named in his honour.
