= Marie-Louise-Élisabeth de Lamoignon de Molé de Champlâtreux =

Blessed Marie-Louise-Élisabeth de Lamoignon de Molé de Champlâtreux
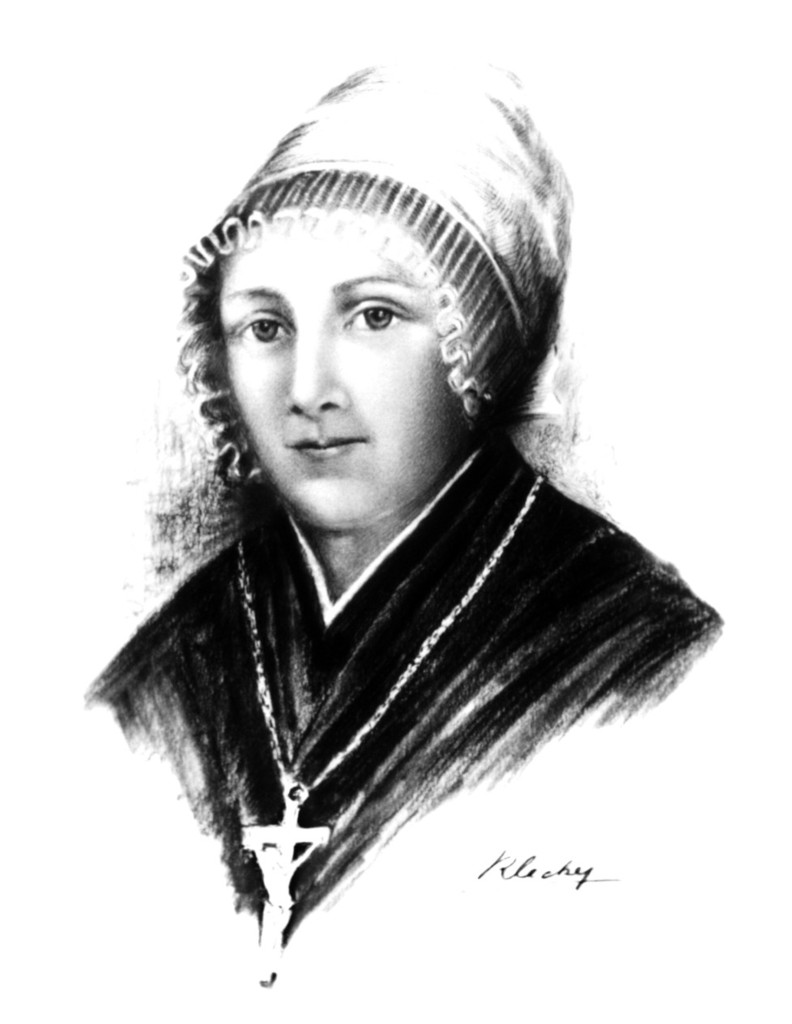

Religious
- Born: 3 October 1763; Paris, Kingdom of France
- Died: 4 March 1825 (aged 61); Vannes, Morbihan, Kingdom of France
- Venerated in: Roman Catholic Church
- Beatified: 27 May 2012, Espalande du Port, Vannes, Morbihan, France by Cardinal Angelo Amato
- Feast: 4 March
- Patronage: Sisters of Charity of Saint Louis; Widows

Marie-Louise-Élisabeth de Lamoignon de Molé de Champlâtreux (3 October 1763 – 4 March 1825) - in religion Saint-Louis - was a French Roman Catholic professed religious and the founder of the Sisters of Charity of Saint Louis (1803). Lamoignon dedicated herself to the education of both the poor and abandoned girls of her region though her love for the poor was noted during her marriage; this was something her politician husband also supported before he was executed during the French Revolution. That period bought great turmoil upon her coupled with the loss of two of her five children.

Her beatification was held in mid-2012 in her native France.

== Life ==
Marie-Louise-Élisabeth de Lamoignon was born on 3 October 1763 in Paris to Chrétien François de Lamoignon (18.12.1735-16.05.1789) - a politician - and Marie-Elisabeth Berryer as the second of six children; her parents' union was described once as "one of the best matches in Paris". Her two politician brothers were Anne-Pierre-Chrétien de Lamoignon (15.06.1770-21.03.1827) and René-Chrétien-Auguste de Lamoignon (19.06.1765-07.04.1845). Her sisters were Marie Gabrielle Olive de Lamoignon (b. 18.01.1761) and Constance de Lamoignon (14.01.1774-30.04.1823) and Marie Catherine de Lamoignon (1759–1849). Lamoignon received her baptism on 3 October after her birth in the local parish church of Saint-Sulpice.

Lamoignon was close to her maternal grandmother who watched over her and instilled religious values in her; she was likewise influenced from her parents' spiritual director and Jesuit priest Louis Bourdaloue. Lamoignon made her First Communion in 1771.

On 9 February 1779 she married the politician Édouard-François Mathieu Molé (05.03.1760-20.04.1794) who came from an esteemed noble household. Her new husband supported her desire for a simple life in service to the poor and the poor soon came to call her the "Angel of the Garrets". Her spiritual director at the time was Father Antoine Xavier Mayneaud de Pancemont and the two often corresponded in secret due to the simmering anti-religious sentiment at the time more so due to the French Revolution. He had dissuaded her from entering a religious order after she became widowed. The couple had five children together but two reached adulthood:

- Louise (1790-94/6)
- Félicité (1786-???)
- Louis-Mathieu (24.01.1781-23.11.1855) - became a noted politician and the sixteenth Prime Minister of France

Her husband decided to move to Brussels in 1791 so all went there but had to return to their native land in January 1792 due to a new law that had been passed regarding immigration. Her husband's noble house soon suffered a steep decline for he was arrested on 19 August 1792 though released in September before being arrested again in October 1793. He was again released but was arrested for the last time in January 1794. The Revolutionary Tribunal condemned him to death on Easter Sunday on 20 April 1794 and he died at the guillotine mere hours later. Lamoignon herself even shared one of these incarcerations with her husband at the Fontaine Grenelle prison though she and her children were also under surveillance due to the state's suspicions of her husband. Her husband's final arrest saw him jailed in the Conciergerie in Paris.

The death of her husband saw her evicted from her home despite her illness and - at that stage - her semi-paralysis and so she had to be carried to an attic apartment on the Rue du Bac in Paris where she resided with her children though it was at this stage her daughter Louise died perhaps due to the terrible conditions.

Her spiritual director Mayneaud later became the Bishop of Vannes in 1802 and he encouraged Lamoignon to establish a new religious congregation and so this prompted her to move with some companions and her mother to Vannes in a small house the group bought. Lamoignon founded her new religious order on 25 May 1803 - entitled the Sisters of Charity of Saint Louis - and she pronounced her vows as "Saint-Louis" before ascending to the rank of Mother Superior. Her order would be dedicated to the poor but more so for the education of poor and abandoned girls. In 1804 - en route to Napoleon's coronation - Pope Pius VII stopped to bless Lamoignon and her order thus giving them his approval though a major setback followed sometime later on 13 March 1807 with Bishop Mayneaud's death; she persevered and managed to open a new house for the order in on 8 September 1808 in Auray called "Père Eternel". The order received monarchical approval from King Louis XVIII in 1816. In 1816 she opened a school in Pléchâtel.

Lamoignon died on 4 March 1825 and died with a crucifix clasped in her hands; her remains were buried in Vannes. Her order received diocesan approval on 24 April 1816 from Bishop Pierre-Ferdinand de Bausset-Roquefort and then received formal papal recognition from Pope Gregory XVI on 4 December 1840.

== Beatification ==
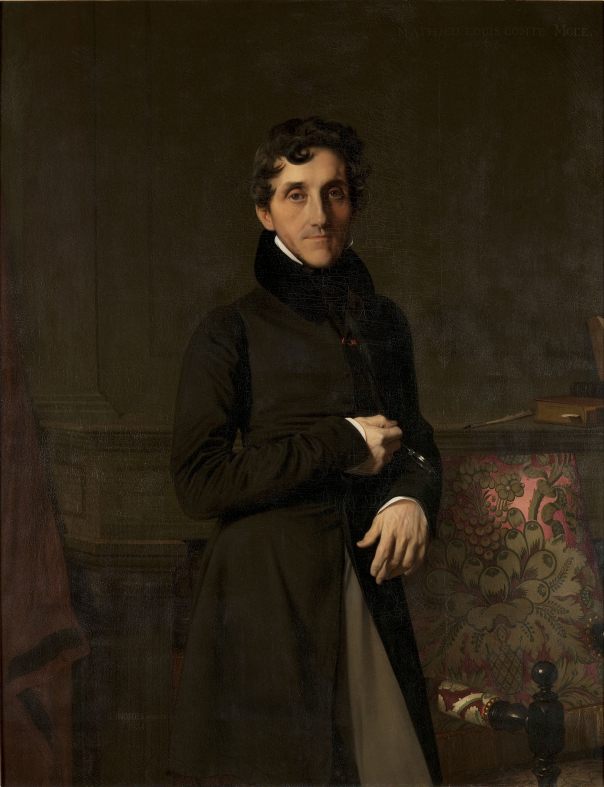
Portrait of Louis-Mathieu Molé by Jean-Auguste-Dominique Ingres, 1834. Her son Mathieu-Louis, who was twice Prime Minister of France.

The beatification process opened in Vannes in an informative process that spanned from 1959 until its closure in 1962 while theologians later approved her spiritual writings on 14 November 1966 as being in line with tradition and the faith. Historians likewise assented to the fact that no historical obstacles existed against the cause on 9 June 1976. The formal introduction to the cause came under Pope Paul VI on 7 July 1977 and she became titled as a Servant of God. Theologians assented to the cause on 25 June 1985 as did the Congregation for the Causes of Saints on 19 November 1985; the confirmation of her heroic virtue allowed for Pope John Paul II to title her as Venerable on 16 January 1986.

The miracle for beatification - a healing science could not explain - was investigated in France in a diocesan process that later received official C.C.S. validation in Rome before a medical panel of experts approved this miracle on 10 February 2011. Theologians likewise concurred on 8 June 2011 as did the C.C.S. on 13 December 2011 while Pope Benedict XVI issued final confirmation needed for it on 19 December 2011. Cardinal Angelo Amato celebrated the beatification in France on 27 May 2012 on the pope's behalf before a crowd of over 4000 people. The miracle that led to her beatification was the cure of Marcel Lesage (c. 1952–2005) who had suffered from chronic osteomyelitis for eight years before appealing for the intercession of Lamoignon to cure him of his ailment.

The current postulator for this cause is Andrea Ambrosi.

== See also ==
· · · ·
