= Ogri =

Biker cartoon by Paul Sample

- Ogri in his early days on a Norvin-style motorcycle
- Author: Paul Sample
- Current status/schedule: Running
- Launch date: 1972
- Syndicate(s): Back Street Heroes magazine
- Publisher(s): Ocean Media Group Limited, London

Ogri watching Malcolm working on his Ol' Ratter

Ogri is a cartoon character of a British rocker-style biker created by English cartoonist and illustrator Paul Sample in 1972 for the UK magazine Bike until January 2009, when it was dropped but quickly taken up by Back Street Heroes, the custom motorcycle magazine. Four book collections of Ogri strips have been produced, and a VHS video. Ogri is a tough, leather-jacketed biker with Thor-like wings attached to his helmet. The actor Ewan McGregor is a fan and owns an Ogri leather jacket, bought from Paul Sample on eBay.

Paul Sample drew in black ink line and colour from 1997, in a style similar to Robert Crumb. As with some other cartoonists, such as Carl Giles, a lot of the pleasure in the cartoons comes from looking at the detail in the cartoon frames; there is almost inevitably a subplot going on. The funny and well observed stories about British bikers usually take place within one page, though two-pagers are sometimes drawn.

Several compilation cartoon books collecting the strips have been published in the UK. Sample also produced a variety of Ogri-related memorabilia, including T-shirts, coffee mugs, posters, greetings cards, and badges. The Paul Sample archive, including many original Ogri strips along with other Paul Sample artwork, was auctioned in Shrewsbury in January 2010. Paul Sample died in January 2026, at the age of 78.27

== Ogri himself ==
Bearing a stubbly, unshaven lantern jaw that would not disgrace Desperate Dan, and a nose that appears to have sustained an impact with a solid object at some time in its history, Ogri's rough and unhandsome face belies its essentially good-natured owner. Ogri originally had a blond mane of hair that showed under his helmet, however this changed early in his history to the better-known black scruff he now sports. Well able to deal out violence when it is warranted, Ogri normally asks little of the world except that it should leave him alone and he does not trouble it when it does not trouble him. He enjoys his beer but is seldom if ever seen worse the wear for drink, and certainly never to the extent of being unfit to ride. Ogri is an all-weather rider, and treats inclement weather in the same manner as the risk of injury - with respect, but defiance.

== Ogri's bike ==
In his original incarnation (1972-1983) Ogri rode Armageddon, a 1000cc Norvin which he may well have built himself. Sometimes he would experiment with another mount, including on one heroic occasion a scooter into which he 'shoehorned' an engine from a Kawasaki H2 Mach IV 750cc two-stroke triple, but he invariably returned to Armageddon.

On his return to Bike in 1986, Ogri sold Armageddon to a collector (and on learning that the buyer never intended the bike to be ridden again, opportunely removed most of the working parts for further use). He now rides a slightly more modern machine, but does not usually have either the means or the inclination to follow the latest manufacturing trends. Besides, Ogri is the living embodiment of the principle that it is the rider, not the machine, that determines speed; he can outrace lesser mortals over any going whatever, no matter what they are riding.

== Engineering ==
Ogri is a gifted tinkerer who can repair most mechanical faults with a spanner, a screwdriver and a spot of know-how. He once reduced his bank manager's BMW to its component parts at the roadside in order to find out why it would not go (obliging the manager to reconsider Ogri's loan application before he would put it back together). Caught out in a severe rainstorm while riding a sidecar combination, Ogri jury-rigged the machine to be controlled from the comfort of the sidecar (with a dummy on the bike to give the illusion of normality and, as matters turned out, to be arrested by an over-zealous traffic policeman, while Ogri sped off in the confusion). He once equipped his grandmother's hand lawnmower with a spare bike engine; thus adapted, the mower cut the lawn in a matter of seconds. He has fitted motorcycles with war-surplus superchargers intended for aero-engines, and has even built a turbojet into a motorcycle frame (a la the actual MTT Superbike). Unfortunately, his few forays into making a living out of motorcycle engineering foundered, as though predestined, on the rocks of sidekick Malcolm's well-meaning incompetence.

== Law and order ==
Traffic police are one bane of Ogri's existence, although not the worst. He has been stopped for speeding on numerous occasions, but he is hard to catch and so (at least in cartoon land) generally escapes unidentified and unpunished. On one topic however he and the police do see eye to eye: motorcycle theft. When a friend of his had his bike stolen, and caught up to the thief at about the same time as the police, Ogri thoroughly approved of letting the police throw the book at the criminal before pursuing any kind of personal revenge. And other than motoring offences, Ogri manages not to cause the police any trouble; although many times guilty of at least minor public-order offences, Ogri steers clear of anything serious.

He is more than willing, though, to take the law into his own hands where necessary. He once dealt with a road-hog by catching up to him, reaching through his open window, and tearing out his steering-wheel. He is not averse to handing out a severe beating to anyone who has endangered his life through careless driving or malice, nor is he above booby-trapping his bike to deal with vandals or thieves. Again, the moral is: you can leave Ogri alone (and he will leave you alone), or you can wish you had.

== Kickstart ==
Ogri keeps a pet dog, a small white mongrel with a strong strain of terrier, that accompanies him wherever he goes. Kickstart never speaks, but his thought-bubbles betray human-like intelligence. He sits placidly on Ogri's pillion seat heedless of speed or danger, asking little of life except the occasional sausage or saucer of beer. In spirit he is a fiercely protective guardian of Ogri's bike and other property, but in practice he is too small to be much of a deterrent. However, on one occasion Kickstart, while leashed to Ogri's bike, scented a lady dog in heat several streets away, and proved strong enough to drag the machine behind him while in pursuit of romantic excitement.

== Malcolm ==
Permanently acne-ridden and runny-nosed, Malcolm is Ogri's utter antithesis; a bumbling incompetent whether riding or maintaining his bike (originally Lunge, a blue Triumph pre-unit twin of 1960s vintage), attempting to charm the opposite sex, or indeed even the most routine and uncomplicated task. His blunders are many and varied. Once he designed a revolutionary means of supercharging his bike's engine by feeding the exhaust gases back into the intake. Another time he used a whole-body plastic bag to keep the rain off (and nearly suffocated a few minutes later). He has ridden round a race-track in the wrong direction, and collided with Ogri (Malcolm's boundless incompetence versus Ogri's massive adequacy is a classic encounter between the irresistible force and the immovable object); he has borrowed Ogri's bike to ride around a race-track and fallen off through following the map of another course. Ogri once gave Malcolm a handful of engine parts to de-grease; he dropped them into a bath of caustic soda, unaware that the chemical dissolved aluminium. He gave him most of an engine to de-coke; Malcolm put it in the washing machine, destroying both the engine and the washing machine. And testing the spark from his spark-plug at the same time as checking the petrol in his tank led to a predictable conflagration that Ogri at once recognised as Malcolm's handiwork from at least a mile away.

Somehow or other, Malcolm manages to avoid permanent injury, whether self-inflicted or as a result of a beating from an infuriated Ogri, and Ogri, no matter what loss Malcolm's unexampled stupidity has occasioned him, invariably forgives the poor, useless article in time for the next strip, and Malcolm's cry of "Aargh! I don't wanna die!" will probably be heard for as long as the cartoon is drawn.

In the animated cartoon "Ogri - Biker Hero", Malcolm is referred to as Ogri's cousin.

== Mitzi ==
Beautiful girls feature large in Ogri's world, although not such as to detract from the main themes of bikes and biking. A long-running addition to the cast is Mitzi, who is stacked like a porn starlet and habitually rides wearing a PVC basque and stockings. It would be a mistake to write Mitzi off as a brainless lust-object, though. She is nearly Ogri's equal as a rider (in a straight race between them, it would be a case of whether Ogri could tune-out Mitzi's distracting appearance well enough to keep his mind on the job, and hardly any other bikers would be even a serious contest) and is dangerous to cross. Plainly an advocate of the look-but-do-not-touch ethos, Mitzi is used to men drooling over her but resents unwarranted familiarity and certainly does not need to hide behind Ogri. The exact nature of their relationship is not well-established; at times they have been lovers, at other times apparently uninvolved.

== Appearances outside the comic world ==
- "Ogri", or "OGR1" has appeared on several motorbike number plates around the world, including a Texan Honda Goldwing, an Australian Triumph Tiger, a Canadian [Ducati Multistrada V4 Rally] and a Michigan Ducati 750SS.
- The Mayor of Sunderland's official vehicle bears the registration mark OGR 1
- Ogri is the name of a British motorcycle club with members world-wide
- Ogri was formerly the name of a motorcycle mailing list. It changed its name to Ixion after Sample objected. (not to be confused with the Oxford Ixion Motorcycle Club which organises motorcycle trials events).
- Ogri appears in an animated music video for the song "Get a Grip" that was culled from the 1995 Black Sabbath album, Forbidden.

== Published work ==
- Sample, Paul (1983). The Ogri Book. Dalkieth Press. ISBN 0946512019.
- Sample, Paul (1996). Ogri: v 4. John Brown Publishing. ISBN 1-870870-77-8.
- Sample, Paul (1998). The Ogri Collection. J H Haynes. ISBN 1-85960-616-4.
- Sample, Paul (2000). The Ogri Collection: No 2. J H Haynes. ISBN 1-85960-693-8.
- Sample, Paul (2005). The Ogri Collection: No 3. J H Haynes. ISBN 1-84425-229-9.

== See also ==
- Werner, a similar German cartoon
