= Olive Dickason =

Canadian historian (1920–2011)

Olive Dickason CM
- Born: Olive Patricia Dickason; 6 March 1920; Winnipeg, Manitoba, Canada
- Died: 12 March 2011 (aged 91)
- Occupations: Historian; journalist
- Spouse: Anthony Dickason (divorced)
- Children: 3
- Awards: Order of Canada (1996); National Aboriginal Achievement Award (1997)

Academic background
- Education: Notre Dame College; University of Ottawa
- Thesis: The Myth of the Savage (1976)
- Academic advisor: Cornelius Jaenen
- Influences: Cornelius Jaenen; Athol Murray

Academic work
- Discipline: History
- Sub-discipline: Canadian Indigenous history
- Institutions: University of Alberta

Olive Patricia Dickason CM (1920–2011) was a Métis historian and journalist. She was the first scholar in Canada to receive a PHD in Indigenous history. She is known for writing one of the first textbooks about First Nations in Canada, Canada's First Nations: A History of Founding Peoples from the Earliest Times.

== Personal life ==
Dickason was born on 6 March 1920 in Winnipeg, Manitoba, to parents Frank Leonard Williamson and Phoebe Philomena Côté, who had Métis heritage. Her father worked for the Bank of Montreal and her mother was a schoolteacher. Her family moved to the Interlake region after losing everything they owned in the 1929 stock market crash. There, her mother taught her and her sister Alice how to hunt, trap, and fish to provide food for the family. The family was unable to send Dickason for more schooling after grade 10 because of their poor financial situation.

Encouraged by her mentor, the priest Athol Murray, she decided to finish high school. He accepted her as the lone girl in his all-boys namesak Notre Dame College in Saskatchewan. She completed a Bachelor of Arts degree in French and philosophy at Notre Dame College, an affiliate of the University of Ottawa. She was the first scholar in Canada to receive a PHD in Indigenous history.

Dickason had three daughters: Anne, Clare, and Roberta. Olive Dickason died on 12 March 2011, one week after her 91st birthday.

== Career ==
She began a 24-year career in journalism at the Regina Leader-Post and subsequently, worked as a writer and editor at the Winnipeg Free Press, the Montreal Gazette, and The Globe and Mail. She promoted coverage of First Nations and women's issues.

In 1970, aged 50, she entered the Master of History program at the University of Ottawa. She had to struggle with faculty preconceptions regarding Aboriginal history – including arguments that it did not exist – before finally finding a professor, Cornelius Jaenen, to act as her academic advisor. "I was lucky ... [a] Belgian fellow, who didn't know much about Native people, but knew a lot about discrimination, took up my cause, and the university eventually admitted me." She completed her master's degree at the University of Ottawa with the thesis Louisburg and the Indians: A Study in Imperial Race Relations, 1713–1760 two years later, and her PhD in 1977. Her doctoral thesis, entitled The Myth of the Savage, was eventually published as were Canada's First Nations: A History of Founding Peoples from the Earliest Times and The Native Imprint: The Contribution of First Peoples to Canada's Character -- Volume 1: to 1815 (1995), which she edited. In addition she also wrote Indian Arts in Canada, which won three awards for conception and design and coauthored The Law of Nations and the New World.

Dickason was appointed an assistant professor at the University of Alberta in 1976. She received tenure as Full Professor in 1985, the same year she turned 65–the age of mandatory retirement as enforced by the University of Alberta's mandatory policy. Dickason filed a complaint with the Alberta Human Rights Commission against the University of Alberta, claiming its mandatory retirement policy was a violation of the Alberta Individual's Rights Protections Act. Dickason won her case in the human rights board of inquiry and the Alberta Queen's Bench, but lost in the Alberta Court of Appeal and then in the Supreme Court of Canada, the latter by a 4–3 split among the judges. She retired from the University of Alberta at age 72 and renewed her relationship with the University of Ottawa. Her time as a professor and her significant contributions to the literature of history in Canada have influenced a whole generation of scholars, and will continue to be the basis for much historical work done in the future.

== Awards ==
Olive was awarded the Order of Canada in 1996, and was the recipient of the Aboriginal Achievement Award, now the Indspire Awards, in 1997. She has also been the recipient of numerous honorary doctorates throughout the years.

== Biography ==
Préfontaine, Darren R. (2021). Changing Canadian History: The Life and Works of Olive Patricia Dickason. Saskatoon: Gabriel Dumont Institute Press. ISBN 978-1-926795-84-3

== Bibliography ==
- Dickason, Olive Patricia; Haas, Rudi (1972). Indian arts in Canada. Ottawa: Arts and Crafts Development Section, Indian-Eskimo Economic Development Branch, Dept. of Indian Affairs and Northern Development.
- Dickason, Olive Patricia (1980). "The concept of L'homme sauvage". In Halpin, Marjorie M.; Ames, Michael M. (eds.). Manlike monsters on trial : early records and modern evidence. Vancouver: University of British Columbia Press. ISBN 9780774801195.
- Dickason, Olive Patricia (1984). The myth of the savage : and the beginnings of French colonialism in the Americas. Edmonton: University of Alberta Press. ISBN 9780888640369.
- Dickason, Olive Patricia (1991). ""For every plant there is a use" : the botanical world of Mexica and Iroquoians". In Abel, Kerry M; Friesen, Jean (eds.). Aboriginal resource use in Canada : historical and legal aspects. Winnipeg: University of Manitoba Press. ISBN 9780887553097.
- Olive Patricia Dickason (1992). Canada's First Nations:A History of Founding Peoples from Earliest Times. University of Oklahoma Press. ISBN 9780195416527.
- Dickason, Olive Patricia (1992). "A historical reconstruction for the northwestern plains". In Francis, R D; Palmer, Howard (eds.). The Prairie West : historical readings. Edmonton, Alta.: Pia Pica Press. ISBN 9780888642271.
- Dickason, Olive Patricia; Green, Leslie Claude (1993). The law of nations and the New World. Edmonton: University of Alberta Press. ISBN 9780888642578.
- Dickason, Olive Patricia (1995). The Native imprint : the contribution of First Peoples to Canada's character, volume 1 : to 1815. Athabasca, Alta.: Athabasca University Educational Enterprises. ISBN 9780919737136.
- Dickason, Olive (1996). "Europeans and a New World cosmography in the 1500s". In Brown, Jennifer S.H. (ed.). Reading beyond words : contexts for native history. Orchard Park, N.Y.: Broadview Press. ISBN 9781551110707.
- Dickason, Olive Patricia (1998). "Art and Amerindian worldviews". In McNab, David (ed.). Earth, water, air and fire : studies in Canadian ethnohistory. Waterloo, Ont.: Wilfrid Laurier University Press. ISBN 9780889202979.
- Dickason, Olive Patricia (1999). "Iron Men, True Men, and the Art of Treaty-Making". In Joseph, Alun E.; Knight, David B. (eds.). Restructuring societies : insights from the social sciences. Ottawa, Ont.: Carleton University Press.
- Dickason, Olive Patricia (2000). "Old world law and new world political realities". In Laiberte, Ron F. (ed.). Expressions in Canadian native studies. Saskatoon: University Extension Press. ISBN 9780888804112.
- Dickason, Olive Patricia (2001). "From "one nation" in the Northeast to "new nation" in the Northwest : a look at the emergence of the métis". In Peterson, Jacqueline; Brown, Jennifer S H (eds.). The new peoples : being and becoming métis in North America. St. Paul, Minn.: Minnesota Historical Society Press. ISBN 9780873514088.
- Dickason, Olive Patricia (2001). "The sixteenth-century French vision of empire: the other side of self-determination". In Warkentin, Germaine; Podruchny, Carolyn (eds.). Decentring the Renaissance : Canada and Europe in multidisciplinary perspective, 1500-1700. Toronto: University of Toronto Press. ISBN 9781442673762.
- Dickson, Olive P. (2002). "Metis". In Magocsi, Paul R. (ed.). Aboriginal peoples of Canada : a short introduction. Toronto: University of Toronto Press. ISBN 9780802036308.
- Dickason, Olive Patricia (2005). "The many faces of Canada's history as it relates to aboriginal people". In McNab, David; Lischke, Ute (eds.). Walking a tightrope : aboriginal people and their representations. Waterloo, Ont.: Wilfrid Laurier University Press. ISBN 9781417599660.
- Dickason, Olive Patricia (2008). "Natives and newcomers in Early "Canada". Canada when Europeans arrives". In Walker, Barrington (ed.). The history of immigration and racism in Canada : essential readings. Toronto: Canadian Scholars' Press. ISBN 9781551303406.
- Dickason, Olive Patricia; Newbigging, William (2010). A concise history of Canada's First Nations. New York: Oxford University Press. ISBN 9780195432428.
- Dickason, Olive Patricia; Long, David Alan (2016). Visions of the heart : issues involving Aboriginal peoples in Canada (Fourth ed.). Don Mills, Ontario, Canada: OUP Canada. ISBN 9780199014774.
