= Athol Murray College of Notre Dame =

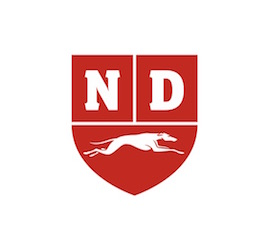

Location
- 49 Main Street; Wilcox, Saskatchewan, S0G 5E0; Canada; 50.0988°N 104.7201°W

Information
- School type: Private, independent school, day, and residential boarding school
- Motto: Luctor et Emergo (Struggle and Emerge)
- Religious affiliation: Roman Catholic
- Founded: 1920; 106 years ago
- Founders: Fr. Athol Murray and the Sisters of Charity of St. Louis
- Principal: Stephane Gauvin
- Grades: 9 through 12
- Gender: Coeducational
- Enrollment: 300
- Average class size: 16
- Language: English
- Colours: Red; White
- Team name: Hounds
- Website: www.notredame.ca
- Last updated: February 4, 2019; 7 years ago

Athol Murray College of Notre Dame is a private, co-educational boarding high school located in Wilcox, Saskatchewan, Canada. It was founded by the Sisters of Charity of St. Louis in 1920 as St. Augustine school when they established Notre Dame of the Prairies Convent. The school was later renamed to honor Father Athol Murray.

== History ==
In 1920, the Sisters of Charity of St. Louis opened the Notre Dame of the Prairies Convent and St. Augustine's residential elementary and high school for boys and girls at Wilcox, Saskatchewan, a small town on the Canadian prairies 49 kilometres (30 mi) south of Regina.

Father Athol Murray was appointed to St. Augustine's parish in Wilcox, Saskatchewan, in 1927. The institution's name was eventually changed to honor his contributions.

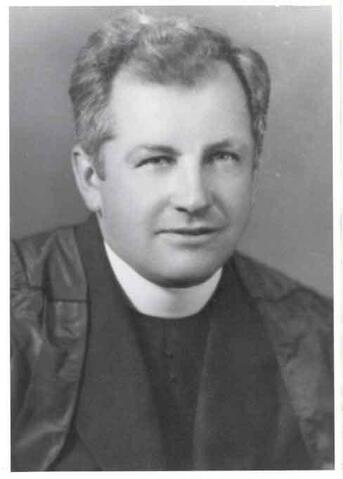
Father Athol Murray c. 1930

In the beginning, the college had no running water or central heating. In 1930, fees were $18 per month, but many students were unable to pay. Murray accepted students on the basis that they desired an education, not on their ability to pay. A side of beef, a chicken, a bucket of coal and produce were often accepted instead of money. Students came from everywhere and from every type of social, cultural and religious background.

Murray was assisted by Sister Mary Edith McCullough, whose teaching career spanned 30 years at Wilcox. McCullough ran the elementary and high schools while Murray spent most of his time with the students in the Arts programs. In 1933, Murray succeeded in obtaining an official affiliation with the University of Ottawa.

The Institute for Stained Glass in Canada has documented the stained glass at the school, which include windows dedicated sixty-seven ex-students of Notre Dame College who served and died during World War II. The stained-glass window by Colonial Studios, Ottawa, circa 1948 depicts St. Augustine.

== Archives Museum ==
The Archives Museum established in 1993 includes a replica of the office of Father Athol Murray, a rare books vault, and a display of the Hockey Hall of Fame.

== Athletics ==
In addition to its academic programs, the college has many sports teams, including the Saskatchewan Junior Hockey League's Notre Dame Hounds. There are also a number of minor ice hockey teams affiliated with Hockey Saskatchewan, and as members of the Canadian Sport School Hockey League (CSSHL). Notre Dame currently fields three midget 'AAA' teams: two male teams (the Hounds and the Argos), and one female team (the Hounds). The Notre Dame Hounds are five-time Telus Cup Champions and most recently won in 2018.

Former Tampa Bay Lightning forwards Vincent Lecavalier and Brad Richards played together in the school's AAA Bantam program, while numerous others have gone on to be drafted into the NHL.

Notre Dame also runs high school athletics programs in basketball, rugby, football, soccer, volleyball, baseball, softball, track and field and wrestling.

== Notable alumni ==
- Gordon Currie 1943 (Order Of Canada)
- Clément Chartier, a Métis Canadian leader, who served as president of the World Council of Indigenous Peoples between 1984–87 and vice-president between 1993 and 1997.
- Dr. Olive Dickason 1945 (Order of Canada)
- Brian Felesky 1960 (Order of Canada)
- Francis Joseph "Frank" Germann (b. 31 August 1922, d. 30 April 2012) accomplished athlete, coach and volunteer, Saskatchewan Baseball Hall of Fame
- Alice Henderson 1951 (author "Notre Dame of the Prairies")
- Bill Hunter 1939 (Order of Canada)
- Daryl Kelly – youngest Canadian to successfully scale Mount Everest
- Jason Kenney 1986 (Premier of Alberta 2019–2022)
- Cy MacDonald, was an educator and political figure in Saskatchewan. He represented Milestone from 1964 to 1975 and Qu'Appelle-Wolseley from 1975 to 1978 in the Legislative Assembly of Saskatchewan as a Liberal.
- Gerald Maier 1946 (Order of Canada)
- Major Derek Prohar M.M.V 1996 (Awarded the Medal of Military Valour & Meritorious Service Decoration)
- Dr. Ray Rajotte 1950 (Order of Canada & one of Canada's leading Diabetes researchers)
- Murray Smith, a businessman and former provincial-level politician
- Kal Suurkask (2011/2012 Action Canada Fellow)

=== Hockey ===
- Keith Aulie
- Rene Bourque
- Rod Brind'Amour
- Jordan Caron
- Wendel Clark
- Braydon Coburn
- Joe Colborne
- Delaney Collins
- Jon Cooper
- Russ Courtnall
- Sean Couturier
- Jordan Eberle
- Dylan Ferguson
- Jaycee Gebhard
- Christopher Gibson
- Brandon Gormley
- Jason Herter
- Paul Jerrard
- Curtis Joseph
- Gord Kluzak
- Slater Koekkoek
- Vincent Lecavalier
- Gary Leeman
- Ella Matteucci
- Stefan Meyer
- Willie Mitchell
- Tyler Myers
- Scott Pellerin
- Teddy Purcell
- Brad Richards
- Morgan Rielly
- Paul Sample
- Jaden Schwartz
- Mandi Schwartz
- Sophie Shirley
- Logan Stephenson
- Todd Strueby
- Barry Trotz
- Taylor Woods

=== Other sports ===
- Scott Franklin, a rugby union player
- Gabby Senft, a rugby union player
- Wayne Shaw, a Canadian football player

=== Musicians ===
- Guillaume Lauzon (Drummer: Sia, Dua Lipa, The Mahones, The Brains)

== Music ==
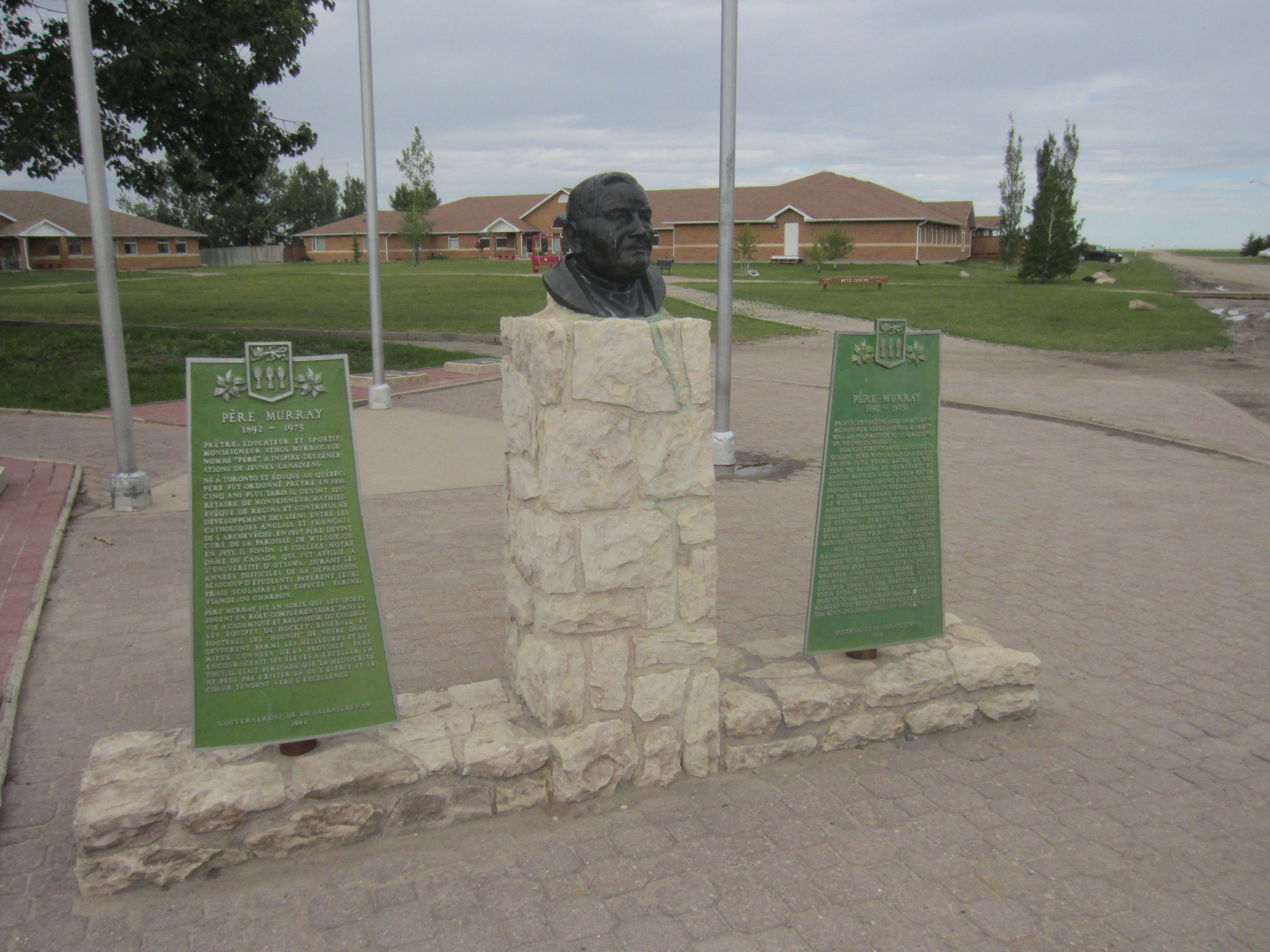
Père plaques on the grounds of Athol Murray College of Notre Dame at Wilcox, Saskatchewan

=== The Prayer and Victory March ===
"Dear Notre Dame, We hail the Alma Mater. Thy loyal sons, Thy banners proudly bear. We pledge to thee, Our love and our devotion, We beg thee hear and grant our prayers. Oh guide our steps, And lead us safely onward, Through all the years, With love and care.

What though the odds be great or small, Old Notre Dame will win over all, While her loyal sons are marching, Onward to victory, Cheer, cheer for old Notre Dame, Wake up the echoes cheering her name, Send a volley, cheer on high, Shake down the thunder from the sky! What though the odds be great or small, Old Notre Dame will win over all, While her loyal sons are marching Onward to victory, Notre Dame!"

== Hazing controversy ==
On December 22, 2021, TSN broke a story about a Notre Dame student who claimed to have been the victim of "a series of vicious sexual, physical and psychological assaults during his time at Notre Dame" in 1986 and has been unable to get an apology for what happened to him since 1999. The hazing incidents included him being forced by other students to eat Kraft Dinner that had been cooked in human urine, to play a tug-of-war-like game wherein his genitalia were attached to those of another student and stretched, and to massage the buttocks of senior students. The student allegedly visited the school nurse at least twice each week because of the beatings, but the nurse never informed his parents of the incidents. A dorm supervisor who witnessed an alleged incident where students whipped the victim with wet towels while he was forced into a jetliner position allegedly ignored the incident. The student fled the school but was forced back inside. The next day, his mother arrived at the school to take him home, and the dorm supervisor informed him that he was being expelled for having left the school without permission, and that the alleged abuse was being investigated. The alumnus filed a negligence lawsuit against the school in 2018, which is ongoing. Notre Dame has not yet apologized for the hazing—which has resulted in mental health challenges and suicide attempts by the victim—and claims that the student's records went missing. Other students have said that some teachers, in particular those who lived in the dorms, did little to nothing to prevent the abuse, and always looked the other way.
