= Back Street Heroes =

UK magazine

- Editor: Nik Samson
- Categories: Custom motorcycles, biker culture
- Frequency: Monthly
- First issue: November/December 1983
- Company: Mortons Media Group
- Country: United Kingdom
- Based in: Horncastle
- Language: English
- Website: www.backstreetheroes.com
- ISSN: 0267-9841

Back Street Heroes (est. 1983) is a monthly UK custom bike magazine that helped to popularize a "new breed" of custom motorcycle, distinct from previous choppers because they combined rat bike-influenced utilitarian and minimalist design with greater use of high tech gadgetry, but catering to an upscale buyer in the Robb Report demographic.

Back Street Heroes "celebrates the sex, drugs and rock 'n' roll, black leather, long hair and open exhausts aspect of motorcycling," targeting, like its US counterpart Easyriders, the "hardcore" niche. It is one of a handful of biker magazines that included fiction until 2016. The magazine tied together geographically isolated enthusiasts of biker culture by keeping them up to date on custom bike mechanical techniques and styles, and motorcycle rallies, as well related culture, such as biker music and their music. All this earned the magazine credibility with the mainstream press on the subject of outlaw motorcycle clubs.

The magazine was launched in 1983 by former SuperBike contributor Steven Myatt, a journalist and custom bike builder. Early contributor and staff members included Jim Fogg, Alison Leight, Mike Holland, Rob Baker, Ian Mutch, Stuart Garland, Rich King, Odgie and Clink.

Ian "Maz" Harris, PhD, founder of the Bulldog Bash rally and spokesman for the Hells Angels, was a regular contributor. Another Hells Angel, Brian 'Moke' Thompson, was also featured in the magazine. L. J. K. Setright contributed technical articles, and Paul Sample's Ogri cartoon moved to Back Street Heroes in 2009 for a short while (ceased in 2012), after 35 years at Bike.
