= Vincent Lecavalier =

Canadian ice hockey player (born 1980)

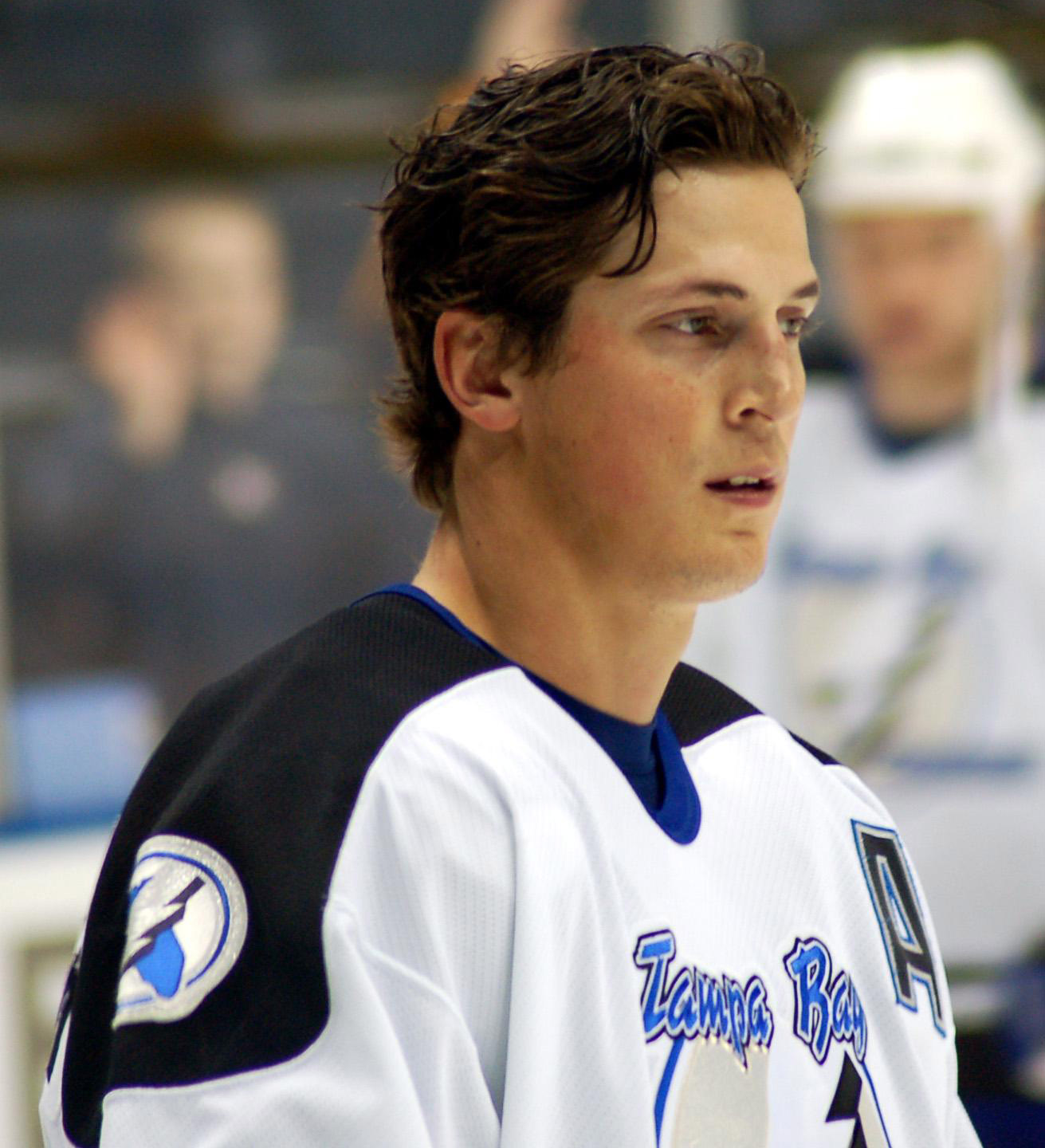
- Lecavalier with the Tampa Bay Lightning in 2006
- Born: April 21, 1980 (age 46) L'Île-Bizard, Quebec, Canada
- Height: 6 ft 4 in (193 cm)
- Weight: 215 lb (98 kg; 15 st 5 lb)
- Position: Centre
- Shot: Left
- Played for: Tampa Bay Lightning; Ak Bars Kazan; Philadelphia Flyers; Los Angeles Kings
- National team: Canada
- NHL draft: 1st overall, 1998; Tampa Bay Lightning
- Playing career: 1998–2016
- Website: http://www.vinny4.com/
Medal record
Representing Canada
Ice hockey
World Cup
Gold medal – first place	2004 Canada

Vincent Lecavalier (born April 21, 1980) is a Canadian former professional ice hockey centre currently working as a special advisor of hockey operations for the Montreal Canadiens of the National Hockey League (NHL). He was selected first overall by the Tampa Bay Lightning in the 1998 NHL entry draft and was a member of their 2004 Stanley Cup championship team. Lecavalier played seventeen seasons in the NHL between 1998 and 2016 and served as captain of the Lightning on two occasions (2000–2001 and 2008–2013) prior to being bought out following the 2012–13 season and signing a 5-year, $22.5 million deal with the Philadelphia Flyers. He finished his NHL career with the Los Angeles Kings.

== Playing career ==
As a youth, Lecavalier played in the 1994 Quebec International Pee-Wee Hockey Tournament with a minor ice hockey team from the North Shore of Montreal.

=== Rimouski Océanic ===
Lecavalier played two years of junior hockey for the Rimouski Océanic of the Quebec Major Junior Hockey League (QMJHL). During his tenure, he quickly established himself as one of the NHL's top prospects. In his first season with the Océanic, he won the Michel Bergeron Trophy as the QMJHL's top rookie forward, and the RDS Cup as the top rookie overall.

=== Professional (1998–2016) ===
==== Tampa Bay Lightning (1998–2013) ====
Lecavalier was drafted first overall by Tampa Bay in the 1998 NHL entry draft, during which new Lightning owner Art Williams proclaimed that Lecavalier would be "the Michael Jordan of hockey".

On March 1, 2000, following his sophomore season, he was named captain, becoming the youngest captain in NHL history at 19 years and 314 days (since surpassed by Sidney Crosby in May 2007, Gabriel Landeskog in September 2012, and Connor McDavid in October 2016). Previously, Steve Yzerman had held that honour, having been named captain of the Detroit Red Wings at 21 years, 5 months.

On January 14, 2001, in a 3–0 loss to the Philadelphia Flyers, Lecavalier suffered a broken foot after getting in the way of a slap shot, causing him to miss the next 14 games. He eventually finished the 2000–01 season playing in 68 games with 23 goals and 28 assists for 51 points.

Lecavalier did not fulfill expectations and was later stripped of the captaincy before the 2001–02 season when Lightning management decided he was too young even as a high calibre player. Around that time, he clashed frequently with head coach John Tortorella.

Tortorella has since noted that Lecavalier matured since losing the team captaincy. During the 2003–04 season, while Martin St. Louis led in regular season scoring and Brad Richards led in the playoffs, Lecavalier played a key role in the team's Stanley Cup victory, assisting on the Cup-clinching goal by Ruslan Fedotenko in the deciding seventh game of the Stanley Cup Final against the Calgary Flames. He was named MVP of the Canadian National Team in the 2004 World Cup of Hockey, which Canada won.

During the lock-out which cancelled the 2004–05 NHL season, Lecavalier, along with Lightning teammates Nikolai Khabibulin and Brad Richards, played for Ak Bars Kazan in the Russian Superleague. Lecavalier scored 15 points as Kazan finished 4th in the league and lost in the first round of the playoffs.

Lecavalier was chosen to play for Team Canada at the 2006 Olympics, but returned to Tampa without a medal.

Lecavalier broke the all-time Tampa Bay Lightning record for most points in a season by scoring his 95th point on March 16, 2007, against the Buffalo Sabres. The record was previously held by Martin St. Louis, who had 94 points during the 2003–04 NHL season. His record of 108 points was since surpassed by future Lightning forward Nikita Kucherov, who recorded Art Ross trophy-winning 144 points (44 goals, 100 assists) during the Lightning's Presidents Trophy-winning 2023–24 season and holds the record at this point. On March 30, 2007, in a game against the Carolina Hurricanes, Lecavalier became the first Lightning player to record 50 goals in a season. He finished the season with 52 goals, edging Ottawa's Dany Heatley, who scored 50 goals, to earn the Maurice "Rocket" Richard Trophy as the NHL's top goal scorer for the 2006–07 season.

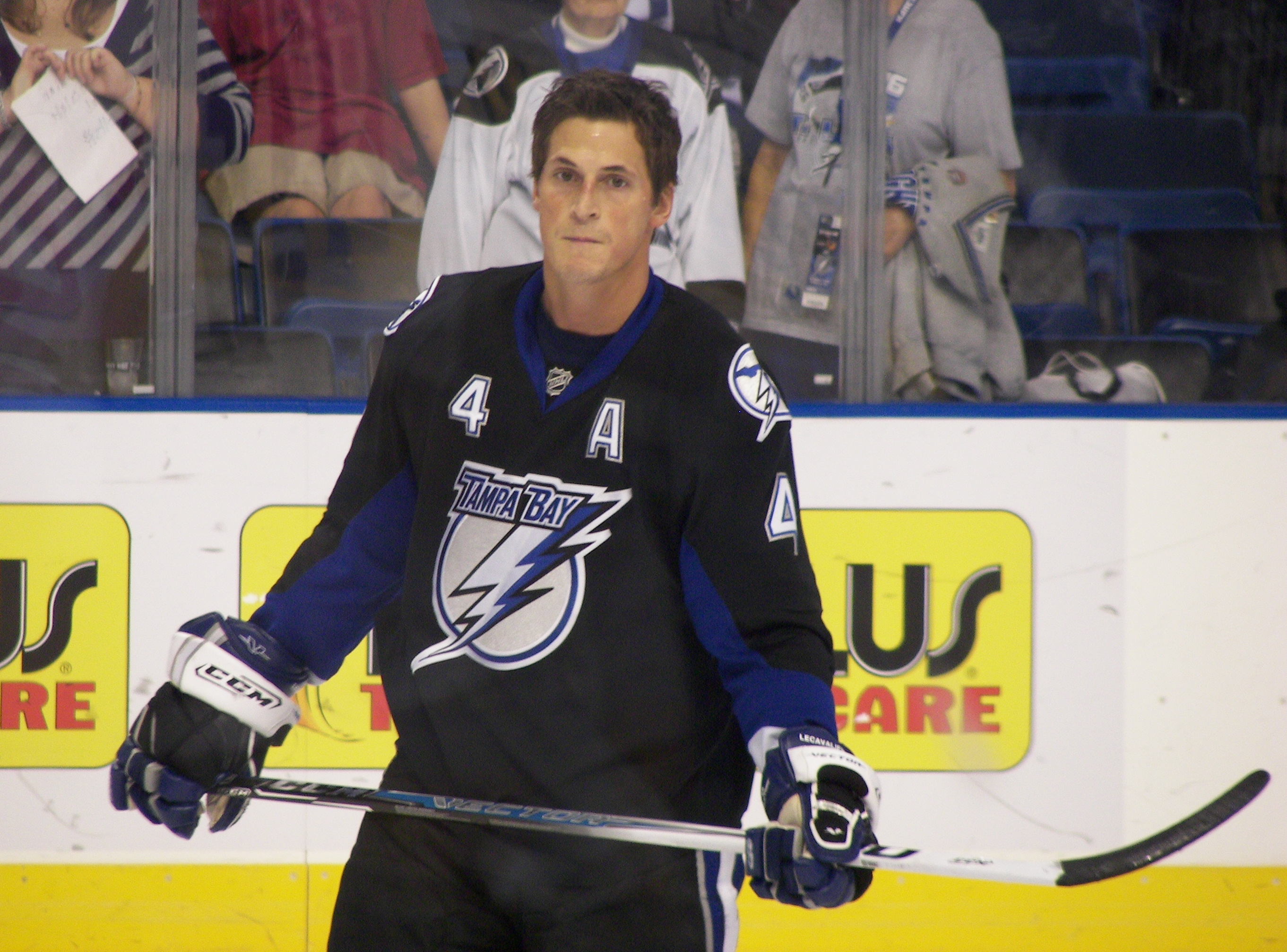
Lecavalier in October 2007

During the 2007–08 season, Lecavalier recorded eight straight multipoint games, being the first to do so since Jaromír Jágr in 1996. The scoring streak put him first in the NHL scoring race, until he was surpassed by Ottawa Senators' captain, Daniel Alfredsson, who scored seven points in the final game before the All-Star break. He was named captain of the Eastern Conference at the 2008 NHL All Star Game. On April 3, 2008, Lecavalier suffered a dislocated shoulder in a 4–1 loss to the Washington Capitals as a result of a fall from a check from Capitals forward Matt Cooke, resulting in Lecavalier missing the final game of the season against the Atlanta Thrashers, where the team would lose 4–1 and undergoing surgery. He finished the season with 40 goals and 52 assists for 92 points in the first 81 games while the Lightning finished last in the NHL overall. At the awards show, Lecavalier was named the winner of both the King Clancy Memorial Trophy and the NHL Foundation Player Award for his tremendous charity work in the community.

On July 12, 2008, Lecavalier agreed to an eleven-year, $85 million contract extension with the Lightning. His new contract began after the 2008–09 season, and ran through the 2019–20 season. He was renamed captain of the Tampa Bay Lightning on September 18, 2008. In mid-January 2009, rumours were swirling around a possible trade which would send Lecavalier to the Montreal Canadiens, his hometown, but Brian Lawton later stated that Lecavalier would rather stay in Tampa Bay for the rest of his career. Lecavalier confirmed in his own words his preference of playing in Tampa Bay over his native Montreal. On January 24, at the NHL's superskills competition, Lecavalier received the loudest ovation from the Montreal crowd when he was being introduced. After playing the first 77 games of the season and recording 29 goals and 38 assists for 67 points, Lecavalier underwent season-ending wrist surgery on April 3, 2009, causing him to miss the final five games of the season.

On November 11, 2010, Lecavalier sustained a broken hand in a 6–3 loss to the Washington Capitals as he got tangled up along the boards with Capitals’ defenseman Karl Alzner, resulting in him undergoing surgery and missing the next 15 games. Lecavalier ended the 2010–11 season with 25 goals and 29 assists for 54 points in 65 games as the Lightning made a heavy resurgence as a team having finished the season as the fifth seed in the East and qualifying for the playoffs for the first time since 2007 as a result. In the 2011 playoffs, Lecavalier and the Lighting recovered from a 3–1 series deficit in the first round against the fourth-seeded Pittsburgh Penguins and defeated them in seven games and would go on to sweep the top-seeded Washington Capitals in the second round before falling in the third round to the third-seeded and eventual Stanley Cup champion Boston Bruins in seven games, one win short from clinching a spot the Stanley Cup Final. Lecavalier finished the playoffs with six goals and 13 assists for 19 points in all 18 games.

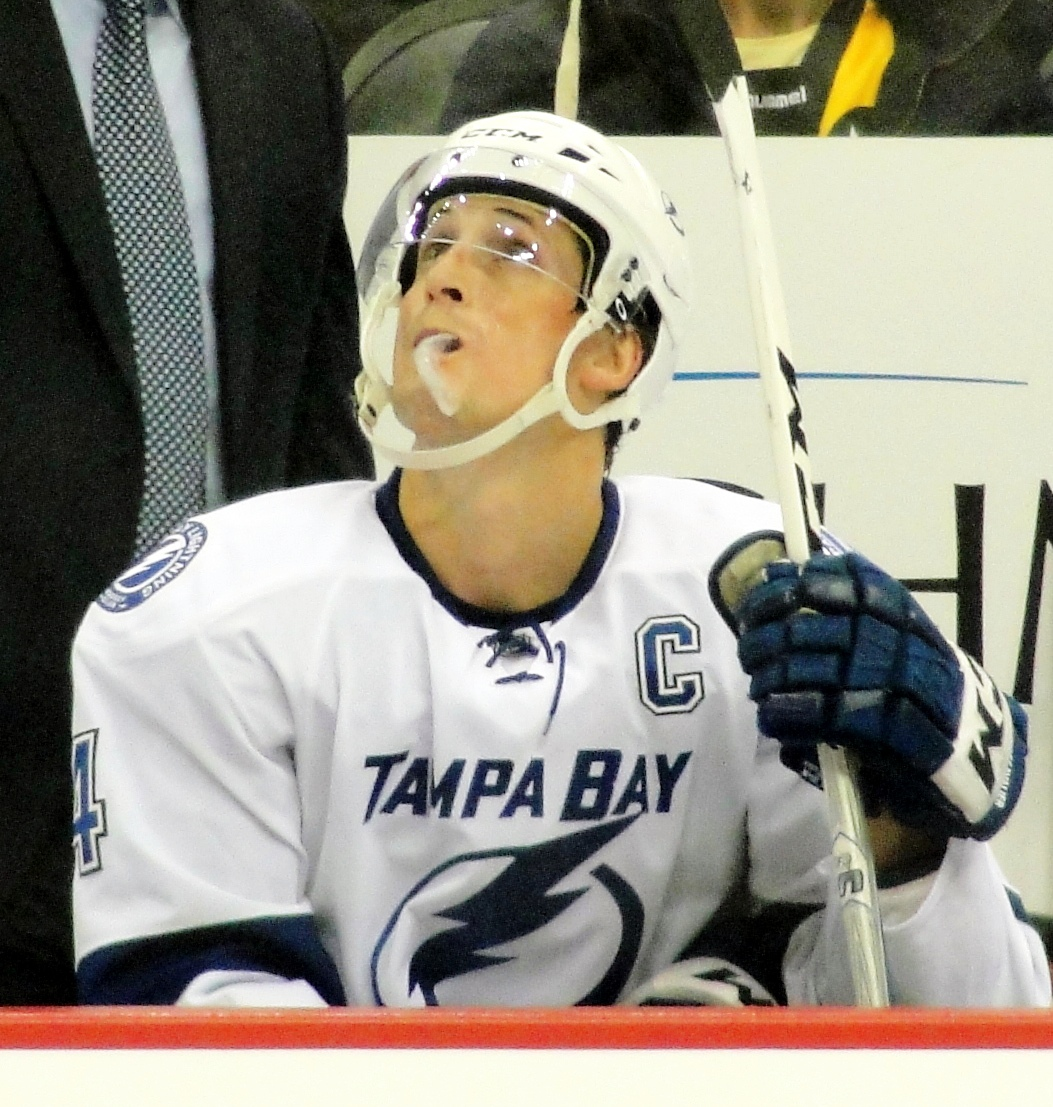
Lecavalier with the Tampa Bay Lightning in February 2012

On February 18, 2012, Lecavalier sustained a broken hand in a 2–1 win against the Washington Capitals. While he managed to finish the game, he would ultimately miss the next 18 games due to the injury. He ultimately ended the 2011–12 season with 22 goals and 27 assists for 49 points in 64 games as the Lightning as a team struggled, missing the playoffs by eight points.

On January 21, 2013, Lecavalier played in his 1000th NHL game in a 4–3 loss to the New York Islanders, becoming the 280th NHL player to reach that milestone. The team honoured him on January 25, their next home game, a 6–4 win against the Ottawa Senators, with several gifts including an engraved silver stick. On February 2, in a 3–2 loss to the New York Rangers, Lecavalier suffered a bruised foot as he was hit by a puck from a slapshot by teammate Sami Salo. This didn’t require him to miss anytime due to it but he eventually would suffer a broken foot on March 12, in a 3–2 win over the Florida Panthers as a result of a collision with Panthers defenseman Erik Gudbranson, causing him to miss nine games. He finished the lockout-shortened 2012–13 campaign with 32 points (10 goals and 22 assists) in 39 games as the Lightning as a team once again continued to struggle as they finished second-to-last in the Eastern Conference and the NHL overall.

In June 2013, the New York Post reported that the Lightning and Toronto Maple Leafs had discussed a trade which would have sent Lecavalier to Toronto; the Maple Leafs would receive an asset in exchange for buying out Lecavalier's contract and he would then be free to re-sign with Tampa as an unrestricted free agent at a lower salary cap hit. Though the Maple Leafs denied the report, NHL Deputy Commissioner Bill Daly promptly sent out a memo to all 30 league teams, warning them to avoid transactions deemed a circumvention of the collective bargaining agreement. The CBA prevents teams from re-signing players they've bought out for a minimum of one year. One day later, the Lightning announced that it was buying out Lecavalier's contract, allowing their longest serving player to become an unrestricted free agent. The buyout would pay Lecavalier a total of $32.67 million and rid the Lightning of his $7.727 million salary cap hit.

==== Philadelphia Flyers (2013–2016) ====
On July 2, 2013, less than a week after being bought out by the Lightning, Lecavalier signed with the Philadelphia Flyers who agreed to pay him $22.5 million over a five-year contract; which is in addition to the $2.33 million he will receive annually from the Lightning for the next 14 years. Lecavalier chose to wear number 40 with the Flyers as his usual number 4 had been retired by the Flyers in honour of Barry Ashbee. On November 27, 2013, Lecavalier made his first return to Tampa as a member of the visiting team and was welcomed with a tribute video as well as a long, standing ovation from Lightning fans. He scored a goal in his homecoming and was awarded the game's 3rd star. On November 30, in a 3–2 win over the Nashville Predators, Lecavalier sustained a minor fracture in his lower back, causing him to miss 13 games. Lecavalier finished the season registering 20 goals and 17 assists On March 30, 2014, and scored his 400th career goal in a 4–3 shootout loss against the Boston Bruins. Lecavalier finished the 2013–14 campaign with 20 goals and 17 assists for 37 points in 69 games. He also had one goal and an assist in the Flyers first round series loss in seven games by the New York Rangers for the 2014 playoffs.

The 2014–15 season began quite poorly for Lecavalier and on December 2, 2014, he was a healthy scratch for the first time in his career. On April 9, 2015, in a game against the Carolina Hurricanes, Lecavalier fought twice against Hurricanes rookie Keegan Lowe, who was playing his first NHL game. Lecavalier didn't play the third period and suffered a concussion. Lecavalier ended the season with 8 goals and 12 assists for 20 points in 57 contests as the Flyers struggled, missing the playoffs.

==== Los Angeles Kings (2016) ====
During the 2015–16 season, having played sparingly for the previous two seasons within the Flyers organization, Lecavalier was traded alongside Luke Schenn to the Los Angeles Kings in exchange for Jordan Weal and a third round pick on January 6, 2016. One of the stipulations of the trade was that Lecavalier would retire at the end of the season to keep the Kings from being saddled with his hit to the salary cap. With number 4 being retired for Rob Blake, Lecavalier chose number 44 for the Kings. He officially announced his retirement on June 21, 2016.

== Personal life ==
Lecavalier went to John Rennie High School in Pointe-Claire, Quebec for two years (1992–1993) before transferring to Athol Murray College of Notre Dame in Wilcox, Saskatchewan. He has been friends with former teammate Brad Richards, who won the Conn Smythe Trophy in 2004 as Most Valuable Player of the NHL playoffs, since the age of 14, when they met at Notre Dame, where they were roommates and became best friends. Since then they have gone on to become teammates with the Rimouski Océanic, the Tampa Bay Lightning and also with Ak Bars Kazan. Lecavalier currently resides in Tampa's Davis Island.

Lecavalier began dating Caroline Portelance in 2001. After ten years of dating, the two were married in 2011. The couple have three children together, Olivia, Gabe, and Amelia.

He is featured in The Rocket: The Maurice Richard Story where he portrayed legendary Montreal Canadiens centre, Jean Béliveau. He wore number 4 to honour Béliveau.

EA Sports' video game NHL 06 featured Lecavalier as the cover athlete.

In October 2007, Lecavalier pledged $3 million to a new All Children's Hospital facility under construction in St. Petersburg, Florida. The facility was named the Vincent Lecavalier Pediatric Cancer and Blood Disorders Center in his honour.

On February 10, 2018, the Tampa Bay Lightning retired Lecavalier's number 4 jersey. Lecavalier is the second player in franchise history to have his jersey retired, the first being Martin St. Louis.

On March 17, 2023, Lecavalier was inducted into the Tampa Bay Lightning Hall of Fame, as a member of its inaugural class.

== Career statistics ==
=== Regular season and playoffs ===
Bold indicates led league

			Regular season					Playoffs
Season	Team	League	GP	G	A	Pts	PIM	GP	G	A	Pts	PIM
1994–95	Notre Dame Hounds Bantam AAA	SHA	50	38	42	80	—	—	—	—	—	—
1995–96	Notre Dame Hounds Midget AAA	SMHL	22	52	52	104	—	—	—	—	—	—
1996–97	Rimouski Océanic	QMJHL	64	42	61	103	38	4	4	3	7	2
1997–98	Rimouski Océanic	QMJHL	58	44	71	115	117	18	15	26	41	46
1998–99	Tampa Bay Lightning	NHL	82	13	15	28	23	—	—	—	—	—
1999–00	Tampa Bay Lightning	NHL	80	25	42	67	43	—	—	—	—	—
2000–01	Tampa Bay Lightning	NHL	68	23	28	51	66	—	—	—	—	—
2001–02	Tampa Bay Lightning	NHL	76	20	17	37	61	—	—	—	—	—
2002–03	Tampa Bay Lightning	NHL	80	33	45	78	39	11	3	3	6	22
2003–04	Tampa Bay Lightning	NHL	81	32	34	66	52	23	9	7	16	25
2004–05	Ak Bars Kazan	RSL	30	7	9	16	78	4	1	0	1	6
2005–06	Tampa Bay Lightning	NHL	80	35	40	75	90	5	1	3	4	7
2006–07	Tampa Bay Lightning	NHL	82	**52**	56	108	44	6	5	2	7	10
2007–08	Tampa Bay Lightning	NHL	81	40	52	92	89	—	—	—	—	—
2008–09	Tampa Bay Lightning	NHL	77	29	38	67	54	—	—	—	—	—
2009–10	Tampa Bay Lightning	NHL	82	24	46	70	63	—	—	—	—	—
2010–11	Tampa Bay Lightning	NHL	65	25	29	54	43	18	6	13	19	16
2011–12	Tampa Bay Lightning	NHL	64	22	27	49	50	—	—	—	—	—
2012–13	Tampa Bay Lightning	NHL	39	10	22	32	29	—	—	—	—	—
2013–14	Philadelphia Flyers	NHL	69	20	17	37	44	7	1	1	2	2
2014–15	Philadelphia Flyers	NHL	57	8	12	20	36	—	—	—	—	—
2015–16	Philadelphia Flyers	NHL	7	0	1	1	2	—	—	—	—	—
2015–16	Los Angeles Kings	NHL	42	10	7	17	20	5	1	1	2	2
NHL totals			1,212	421	528	949	848	75	26	30	56	84

=== International ===
Year	Team	Event	Result	GP	G	A	Pts	PIM
1998	Canada	WJC	8th	7	1	1	2	4
2001	Canada	WC	5th	7	3	2	5	29
2004	Canada	WCH	1st place, gold medalist(s)	6	2	5	7	8
2006	Canada	OG	7th	6	0	3	3	16
Junior totals				7	1	1	2	4
Senior totals				19	5	10	15	53

== Awards and honors ==
=== Junior ===
- QMJHL All-Rookie Team – 1997
- Michel Bergeron Trophy (QMJHL Offensive Rookie of the Year) – 1997
- RDS Cup (QMJHL Rookie of the Year) – 1997
- CHL All-Rookie Team – 1997
- CHL Rookie of the Year – 1997
- QMJHL first All-Star team – 1998
- Mike Bossy Trophy (QMJHL Top Draft Prospect) – 1998
- CHL first All-Star team – 1998
- CHL Top Draft Prospect Award – 1998

=== NHL ===
- Stanley Cup champion – 2004
- EA Sports NHL cover athlete - 2006
- Maurice "Rocket" Richard Trophy – 2007
- NHL second All-Star team – 2007
- King Clancy Memorial Trophy – 2008
- NHL Foundation Player Award – 2008
- NHL All-Star Game – 2003, 2007, 2008 (captain), 2009
- Tampa Bay Lightning #4 retired

=== International ===
- World Cup of Hockey – 2004
- World Cup of Hockey All-Star team – 2004
- World Cup of Hockey MVP – 2004

== See also ==
- List of NHL players with 1,000 games played

Preceded by Joe Thornton	NHL first overall draft pick 1998	Succeeded by Patrik Štefan
Preceded by Paul Mara	Tampa Bay Lightning first-round draft pick 1998	Succeeded by Nikita Alexeev
Preceded by Chris Gratton; Tim Taylor	Tampa Bay Lightning captain 2000–01; 2008–13	Succeeded by Dave Andreychuk; Martin St. Louis
Preceded by Jonathan Cheechoo	Winner of the Rocket Richard Trophy; 2007	Succeeded by Alexander Ovechkin
Preceded by Saku Koivu	Winner of the King Clancy Memorial Trophy; 2008	Succeeded by Ethan Moreau
