= L. J. K. Setright =

British motoring journalist (1931–2005)

- Born: Leonard John Kensell Setright; 10 August 1931; London, England
- Died: 7 September 2005 (aged 74); Surbiton, London, England
- Education: University College London
- Occupations: Author, journalist, lawyer, air traffic controller
- Writing career
- Genres: Non-fiction history and technology
- Subjects: Automotive and motorcycling
- Notable awards: Gwen Salmon Trophy for automotive photography, fellow Institute of Mechanical Engineers (1969), fellow Institute of Rubber Industries (1970)

Leonard John Kensell Setright (10 August 1931 – 7 September 2005) was an English motoring journalist and author.

== Early life and education ==
Setright was born in London to Australian parents; his father, Henry Roy Setright, was an engineer who invented the Setright ticket machine used on buses and trams. He died when Setright was 11 years old. Setright attended Palmers Green Grammar school before studying law at the University of London which he practised for a time but hated the profession. His National Service was served in the Royal Air Force as an air traffic controller.

== Writing career ==
After writing for the engineering magazine Machine Age in the early 1960s, Setright became a motoring journalist and author, contributing to Car Magazine for more than 30 years and writing several books on cars and automotive engineering. Setright's writing style polarised readers as some considered it to be pompous and excessively esoteric, while others found his erudite style and engineering knowledge a welcome change from the usual lightweight and largely non-technical journalistic style. He had a strong enthusiasm for Bristol Cars and for Japanese engineering, in particular Honda.

Setright also wrote about music, motorcycles and high-fidelity sound systems, and contributed to, among others, Punch, The Independent, Bike, Cycle Guide/USA, Motorcycle Sport under the initials LJKS, Back Street Heroes and Car and Driver.

== Personal life ==
Setright was also known for his love of smoking tobacco, in particular Sobranie Black Russian cigarettes, and for his elegant sartorial style. He was described as resembling "a gaunt Old Testament prophet in Savile Row clothes". He was an accomplished clarinet player.

Setright was a practising Jew and a scholar of Judaism. He was married twice; his first wife, Christina, committed suicide in 1980. After this he spent some time in a Lubavitch community in Texas, later returning to the UK, and he settled in Surbiton, near London, where he died of cancer in 2005.

== List of works ==
Author

- Setright, L.J.K. (1968). The Grand Prix Car 1954-1966. George Allen & Unwin.
- —— (1971). Ferrari, Ballantines Illustrated History of the Car, Marque Book No. 5. Ballantine Books. ISBN 0-345-02343-9.
- —— (1971). Rolls-Royce, Ballantine's Illustrated History of the Car, Marque Book No. 7. Ballantine Books. ISBN 0-345-02386-2.
- —— (1971). The Power to Fly: The Development of the Piston Engine in Aviation. Allen & Unwin. ISBN 0-04-338041-7.
- —— (1972). Automobile Tyres. Chapman and Hall. ISBN 978-0412098505.
- —— (1973). The Grand Prix, 1906 to 1972. Thomas Nelson & Sons Ltd. ISBN 0-17-148025-2.
- —— (1974). Bristol Cars and Engines. Motor Racing Publications Ltd. ISBN 0-900549-22-X.
- —— (1975). Rolls-Royce. Haynes Publishing Group. ISBN 0-85429-200-4.
- —— (1975). Some Unusual Engines. Mechanical Engineering Publications. ISBN 0-85298-208-9.
- —— (1976). The Designers: Great Automobiles and the Men Who Made Them. Follet Publishing. ISBN 0-695-80584-3.
- —— (1976). Motorcycles. Weidenfeld & Nicolson. ISBN 978-0-297-77234-7.
- —— (1976). Turbocharging and Supercharging for maximum power and torque. J H Haynes. ISBN 0-85429-184-9.
- —— (1978). Anatomy of the Automobile. Random House Value Publishing. ISBN 0-517-26999-6.
- —— (1978). Bahnstormer: The Story of BMW Motorcycles. Transport Bookman Publications. ISBN 0-85184-021-3.
- —— (1979). The Guinness book of motorcycling facts and feats. Guinness Superlatives. ISBN 978-0-85112-200-7.
- —— (1999). Mercedes-Benz SL and SLC. Motorbooks International. ISBN 1-85532-880-1.
- —— (1999). Mini : The Design Icon of a Generation. Virgin Books. ISBN 1-85227-815-3.
- —— (2004). Drive On!: A Social History of the Motor Car. Granta Books. ISBN 1-86207-698-7.
- —— (2006). Long Lane with Turnings: Last Words of a Motoring Legend. Granta Books. ISBN 1-86207-872-6.
- —— (2017). A day to remember. Uitgeverij Nobelman. ISBN 978-949173-729-9.
- Setright, L.J.K. (2019). A day to remember, the writings of L.J.K. Setright for GranTurismo Magazine. Uitgeverij Nobelman. ISBN 978-94-917373-0-5.

Coauthor

- Hough, Richard Alexander; Setright, L.J.K. (1966). A history of the world's motorcycles. New York: Harper & Row. LCCN 66018583.
- Setright, L. J. K.; Forsyth, Derek; Newman, Robert (1987). With flying colours: the Pirelli album of motor sport; The Pirelli Album of Motor Sport Series. Summit Books. ISBN 0-671-64459-9.

Editor

- Setright, L. J. K., ed. (1969). Twistgrip: a motor cycling anthology. Allen & Unwin. ISBN 978-0-04-796031-4.
- Smith, Philip Hubert (1971). Setright, L. J. K. (ed.). Valve mechanisms for high-speed engines: their design and development (2nd ed.). R. Bentley. ISBN 0-8376-0019-7.
