= Brad Richards =

Canadian ice hockey player (born 1980)

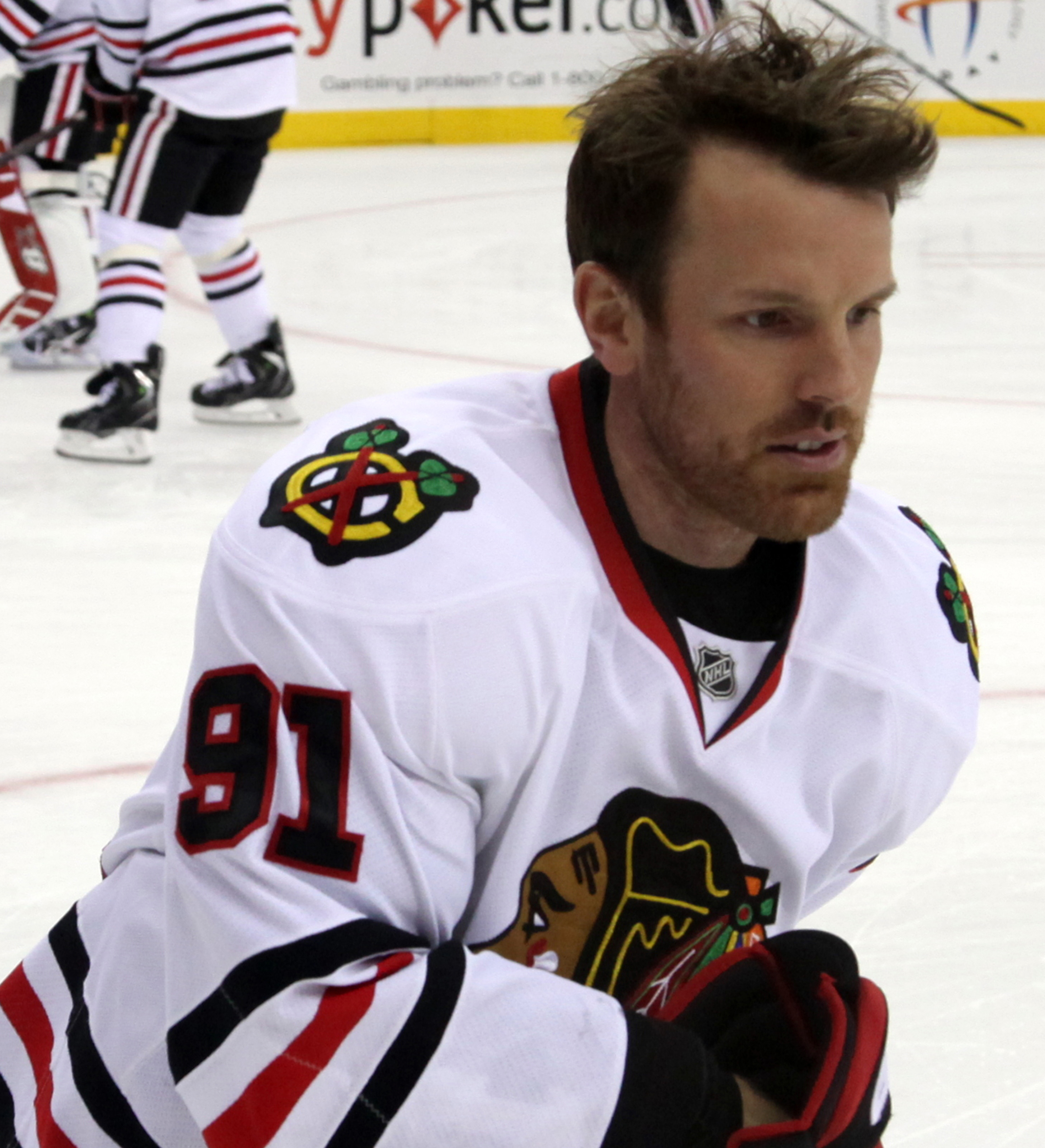
- Richards with the Chicago Blackhawks in December 2014
- Born: May 2, 1980 (age 46) Murray Harbour, Prince Edward Island, Canada
- Height: 6 ft 0 in (183 cm)
- Weight: 198 lb (90 kg; 14 st 2 lb)
- Position: Centre
- Shot: Left
- Played for: Tampa Bay Lightning; Dallas Stars; New York Rangers; Chicago Blackhawks; Detroit Red Wings; Ak Bars Kazan
- National team: Canada
- NHL draft: 64th overall, 1998; Tampa Bay Lightning
- Playing career: 2000–2016

Bradley Ray Richards (born May 2, 1980) is a Canadian former professional ice hockey centre. Richards was drafted in the third round, 64th overall, by the Tampa Bay Lightning in the 1998 NHL entry draft and played for the Lightning, New York Rangers, Dallas Stars, Chicago Blackhawks, and Detroit Red Wings during his National Hockey League (NHL) career.

Richards is a two-time Stanley Cup champion, having won in 2004 with the Lightning, where he was awarded the Conn Smythe Trophy as the most valuable player during the playoffs. He also won in 2015 as a member of the Blackhawks. One of eight players to play in a game seven of a Stanley Cup playoff eight times (the most in the league history), Richards was on the winning side of each game, a feat matched by no other player.

== Early career ==
Richards was born and raised in Murray Harbour, Prince Edward Island. Since age 14, Richards has been friends with Vincent Lecavalier after they met at Athol Murray College of Notre Dame, a boarding school with a renowned hockey program in Wilcox, Saskatchewan. They were roommates and soon became good friends as they were both the youngest players on their hockey team. Since then, they went on to become teammates for the Rimouski Océanic of the Quebec Major Junior Hockey League (QMJHL) and the Tampa Bay Lightning. Lecavalier was also responsible for suggesting to Lightning management after they had drafted him to draft Richards.

In his final season with Rimouski, Richards won nearly every honour possible for a Canadian junior player in the QMJHL: he earned the Jean Béliveau Trophy after leading the QMJHL with 186 points, as well as the Telus Cup, given to the league's best offensive player; he won the QMJHL and Canadian Hockey League Plus/Minus Awards with a plus-80 mark, and was a First-Team All-Star in both the Quebec circuit and the Canadian Hockey League (CHL), as well as the CHL Player of the Year and Leading Scorer. In the post-season, Richards took home both the Guy Lafleur Trophy as MVP of the QMJHL playoffs, then the Stafford Smythe Memorial Trophy as MVP of the 2000 Memorial Cup, as the Océanic won both the QMJHL playoff title and the CHL Memorial Cup.

== Playing career (2000–2016) ==
=== Tampa Bay Lightning (2000–2008) ===
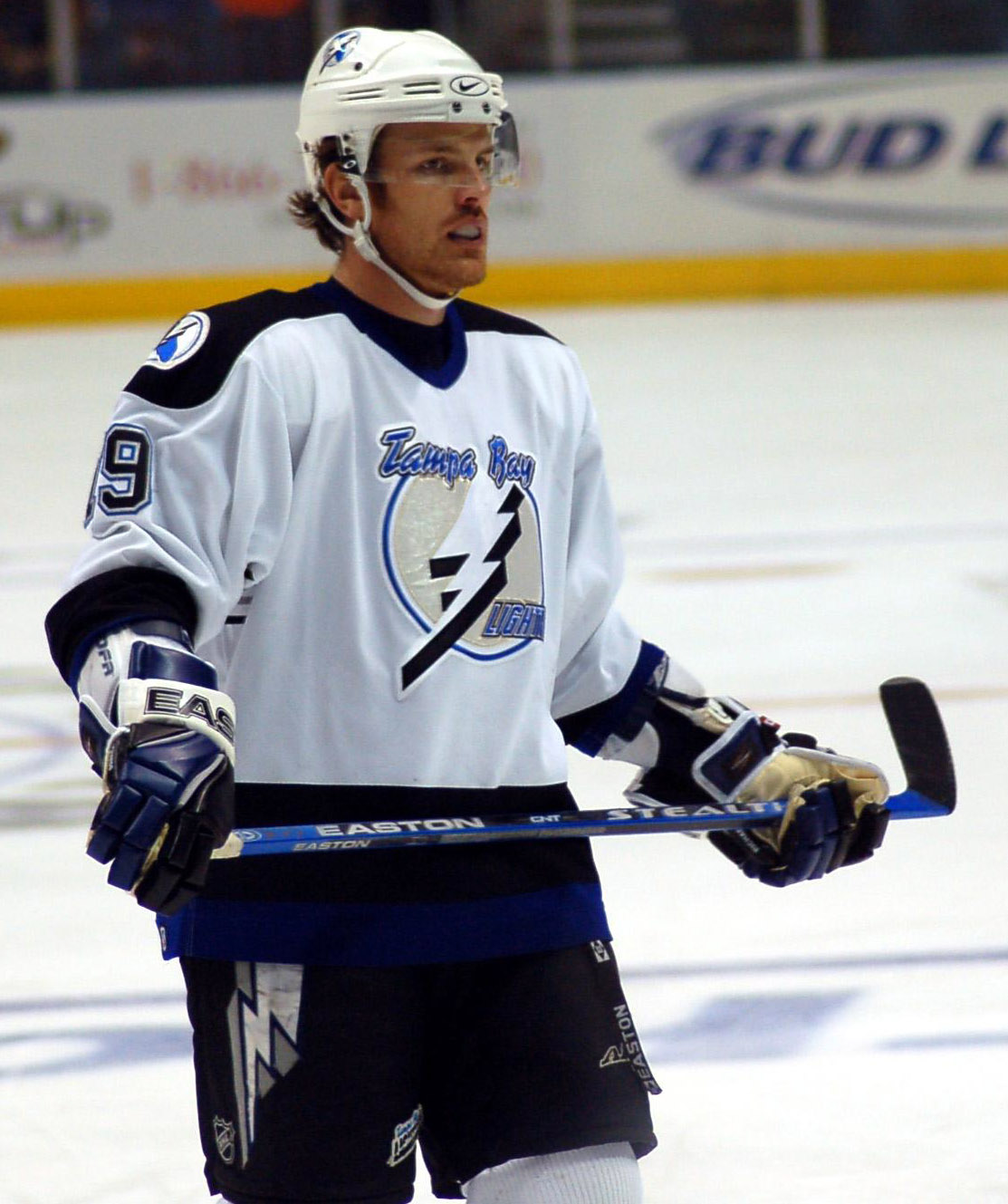
Richards with the Tampa Bay Lightning in January 2006

Richards was drafted in the third round, 64th overall, by the Tampa Bay Lightning in the 1998 NHL entry draft, having recorded 82 assists and 115 points in his draft year. During that same draft, the Lightning selected Vincent Lecavalier, Richards' teammate at both the Athol Murray College of Notre Dame and Rimouski, with the first overall pick. During the 2003–04 NHL season, the Lightning would win their first Stanley Cup, with Richards' contributions during the playoffs earning him the Conn Smythe Trophy as most valuable player of the postseason, which included a record seven game-winning goals, overtaking Joe Sakic's and Joe Nieuwendyk's record of six. He also won the Lady Byng Memorial Trophy that season. Later that year, he won the World Cup of Hockey Championship playing on Team Canada.

On September 26, 2004, the Rimouski Océanic of the QMJHL retired Richards' jersey.

Richards played for Ak Bars Kazan in the Russian Superleague (RSL) during the 2004–05 NHL lockout on a team with fellow NHLers Ilya Kovalchuk, Alexei Kovalev, Vincent Lecavalier, Michael Nylander, Alexei Zhitnik, Dany Heatley and Nikolai Khabibulin. Richards also played for Team Canada at the 2006 Olympics.

After the Lightning were eliminated from the 2006 playoffs, the Lightning re-signed Richards to a five-year, US$39 million contract extension.

=== Dallas Stars (2008–2011) ===
On February 26, 2008, roughly three hours before the NHL trade deadline, Richards was traded to the Dallas Stars in a blockbuster deal (along with goaltender Johan Holmqvist) in exchange for goaltender Mike Smith, centre Jeff Halpern, winger Jussi Jokinen and a 2009 fourth-round draft pick. Richards set the Stars' franchise record of most assists in a player's team debut game with five; the record is also a career high for Richards. In the game, Dallas defeated the Chicago Blackhawks 7–4, and Richards was named the game's first star.

In the 2008 playoffs, Richards tied an NHL record by scoring four points in a single period in a game against the San Jose Sharks.

During the 2008–09 season, Richards tallied 16 goals and 48 points in 55 games before sustaining a broken wrist following a check from Columbus Blue Jackets forward Jakub Voráček on February 16, 2009. Richards met with a specialist the following day and missed 15 games. Richards returned to the Stars' line-up on March 21, but he then broke his other hand in the third period of Dallas' loss to San Jose. He would not return for the rest of the season, and the Stars missed the playoffs.

In the 2009 off-season, the team removed general managers Brett Hull and Les Jackson, who had traded for Richards, and fired head coach Dave Tippett, replacing the latter with Marc Crawford. Despite the new regime and the team's woeful finish in the standings for the second-straight season, Richards enjoyed a career year, matching a personal high with 91 points scored, playing mainly alongside Loui Eriksson and roommate James Neal. Richards finished seventh in the NHL points standings that year, just behind former Lightning teammate Martin St. Louis. He also finished fourth in the NHL in total assists and second in powerplay points. However, the Stars failed to reach 2010 playoffs. After the season, Richards was named a finalist for the Lady Byng Trophy.

=== New York Rangers (2011–2014) ===
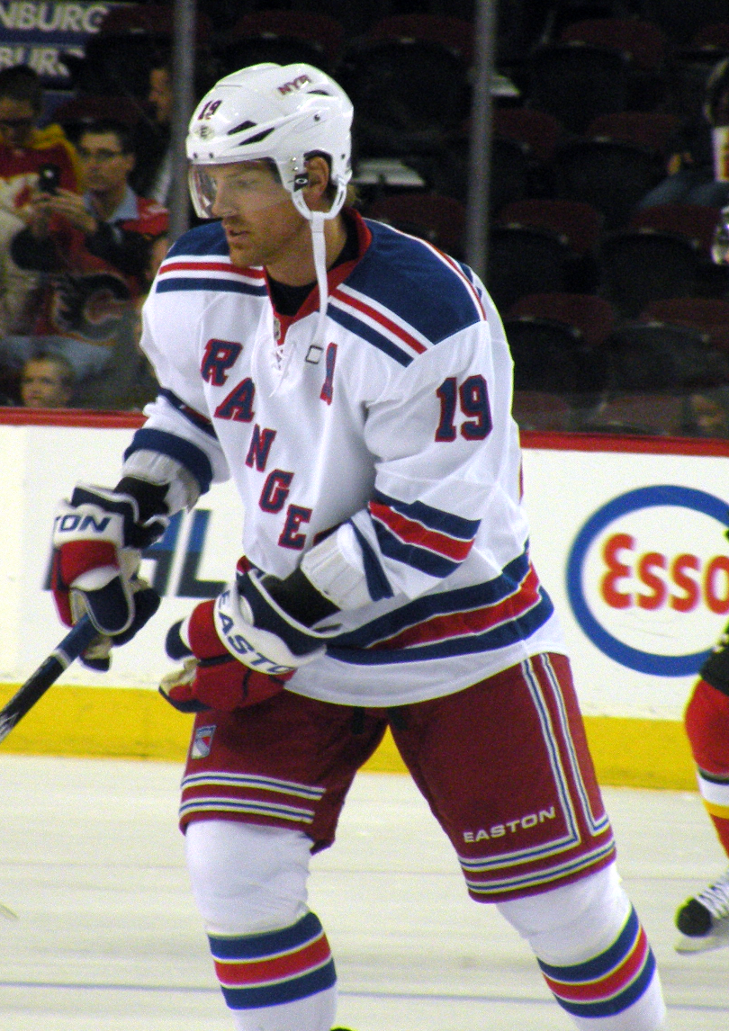
Richards with the New York Rangers in October 2011

After becoming an unrestricted free agent, Richards signed a nine-year, $60 million contract with the New York Rangers on July 2, 2011, reuniting him with John Tortorella, his head coach from the 2004 Lightning team that won the Stanley Cup, and another member of that 2004 team, Ruslan Fedotenko. He was also approached by the Calgary Flames, Los Angeles Kings, Toronto Maple Leafs and the Tampa Bay Lightning.

On October 8, 2011, Richards scored his first goal as a Ranger in a 2–1 shootout loss to the Anaheim Ducks. The game was played at the Ericsson Globe in Stockholm. He would go on to record 25 goals along with 41 assists during his first season with the Rangers, as well as six goals and nine assists in 20 playoff games, as the top seeded Rangers were ultimately eliminated from the 2012 playoffs by the sixth seeded New Jersey Devils in the third round in six games.

On April 19, 2013, Richards scored his first career NHL hat-trick in a game against the Buffalo Sabres.

On March 5, 2014, the Rangers acquired Martin St. Louis, reuniting the two, who were previously teammates when the Lightning won the cup in 2004. St. Louis and Richards both played integral roles in the Rangers' run to the 2014 Stanley Cup Final, which they lost in five games to the Los Angeles Kings.

On June 20, 2014, the Rangers used a compliance buyout on the remaining seven years of Richards' contract in an effort to increase salary cap space. This rendered him an unrestricted free agent, and ended the brief reunion between him and St. Louis.

=== Chicago Blackhawks (2014–2015) ===
On July 1, 2014, Richards signed a one-year, $2 million contract with the Chicago Blackhawks. He wore number 91 for the Blackhawks, the first player in team history to do so, as his usual #19 was already being worn by Blackhawks captain Jonathan Toews Richards played in his 1,000th career NHL game on November 16, 2014, against his former team, the Dallas Stars. In 76 regular season games with the Blackhawks, Richards scored 12 goals with 25 assists for 37 points as he played on the second line with Bryan Bickell and Patrick Kane.

The Blackhawks, with Richards, later faced one of his former teams, the Tampa Bay Lightning, in the 2015 Stanley Cup Final. Chicago would prevail in six games, giving Richards his second Stanley Cup title. He assisted on Patrick Kane's late third-period goal in the deciding game six at the United Center, sealing the 4–2 series victory.

=== Detroit Red Wings (2015–2016) ===
On July 1, 2015, Richards signed a one-year, $3 million contract with the Detroit Red Wings, worth up to $4 million with playoff bonuses. With Richards' traditional #19 retired for Steve Yzerman and #91 not having been worn in Detroit by anyone since Sergei Fedorov, Richards chose to wear #17 with the Red Wings, becoming the 3rd Prince Edward Island native to wear the jersey number with the club after Forbes Kennedy in 1958-60, and Gerard Gallant in 1985-93.

The Red Wings narrowly made the playoffs for the 25th consecutive season. Richards' late-season efforts included a game-tying goal against his former Rangers teammates on March 12 with 32 seconds remaining (the Red Wings later won the game 2–1 in overtime), and a two-point game against the Toronto Maple Leafs on April 2. He'd finish the season with 10 goals and 18 assists in 68 games. In the 2016 playoffs, Richards scored one goal as the Red Wings were eliminated in five games by the Lightning in Round 1. Had the Red Wings advanced, Richards was due a $250,000 bonus with an additional $750,000 available if they had won the second round as well.

On July 20, 2016, Richards announced his retirement from professional hockey. In a statement issued by the National Hockey League Players Association, Richards reflected on his Cup wins: "Winning the Stanley Cups in Tampa Bay and Chicago was the best part of my career and I will never forget those moments. Nothing compares to enjoying that night with your team and knowing what you have accomplished together."

== Coaching career ==
On December 12, 2023, Brad Richards was selected to be a consultant for the St. Louis Blues after firing former head coach Craig Berube.

== Personal life ==
During the off-season, Richards goes back to his birthplace of Murray Harbour, Prince Edward Island. Richards has hosted the Brad Richards PEI Celebrity Golf Classic for the past six years. The event supports two charities: Children's Wish Foundation, Prince Edward Island Chapter and Autism Society of Prince Edward Island. He is friends with Hockey Night in Canada host Ron MacLean, who spends a lot of time in PEI. During his time with the Rangers, Richards lived in an apartment in Manhattan.

Richards rented a suite at the St. Pete Times Forum (now called the Amalie Arena) for several Tampa Bay Lightning hockey games and invited families dealing with various forms of pediatric cancer to use it. After each game, he would go and visit the children who had come to watch the game. It began during the 2002–03 season and ended in 2008. When he was traded to the Dallas Stars, he continued his charity work with the Children's Medical Center's Oncology Department, supplying tickets for sick children. He also donates tickets to every home game to men and women in the military.

Richards underwent arthroscopic hip surgery on April 23, 2010, to repair a small labrum tear. In September 2010, he donated $500,000 to the Queen Elizabeth Hospital in Charlottetown, PEI.

Richards and his Australian wife Rechelle have two children. Richards speaks both English and French.

== Career statistics ==
=== Regular season and playoffs ===
			Regular season					Playoffs
Season	Team	League	GP	G	A	Pts	PIM	GP	G	A	Pts	PIM
1996–97	Notre Dame Hounds	SJHL	63	39	48	87	73	—	—	—	—	—
1997–98	Rimouski Océanic	QMJHL	68	33	82	115	44	19	8	24	32	2
1998–99	Rimouski Océanic	QMJHL	59	39	92	131	55	11	9	12	21	6
1999–00	Rimouski Océanic	QMJHL	63	71	115	186	69	12	13	24	37	16
2000–01	Tampa Bay Lightning	NHL	82	21	41	62	14	—	—	—	—	—
2001–02	Tampa Bay Lightning	NHL	82	20	42	62	13	—	—	—	—	—
2002–03	Tampa Bay Lightning	NHL	80	17	57	74	24	11	0	5	5	12
2003–04	Tampa Bay Lightning	NHL	82	26	53	79	12	23	12	14	26	4
2004–05	Ak Bars Kazan	RSL	6	2	5	7	16	—	—	—	—	—
2005–06	Tampa Bay Lightning	NHL	82	23	68	91	32	5	3	5	8	6
2006–07	Tampa Bay Lightning	NHL	82	25	45	70	23	6	3	5	8	6
2007–08	Tampa Bay Lightning	NHL	62	18	33	51	15	—	—	—	—	—
2007–08	Dallas Stars	NHL	12	2	9	11	0	18	3	12	15	8
2008–09	Dallas Stars	NHL	56	16	32	48	6	—	—	—	—	—
2009–10	Dallas Stars	NHL	80	24	67	91	14	—	—	—	—	—
2010–11	Dallas Stars	NHL	72	28	49	77	24	—	—	—	—	—
2011–12	New York Rangers	NHL	82	25	41	66	22	20	6	9	15	8
2012–13	New York Rangers	NHL	46	11	23	34	14	10	1	0	1	2
2013–14	New York Rangers	NHL	82	20	31	51	18	25	5	7	12	4
2014–15	Chicago Blackhawks	NHL	76	12	25	37	12	23	3	11	14	8
2015–16	Detroit Red Wings	NHL	68	10	18	28	8	5	1	0	1	7
NHL totals			1,126	298	634	932	251	146	37	68	105	65

=== International ===
Medal record

Representing Canada

World Cup
Gold medal – first place	2004 Canada	

World Junior Championships
Bronze medal – third place	2000 Sweden	

Year	Team	Event	GP	G	A	Pts	PIM
2000	Canada	WJC	7	1	1	2	0
2001	Canada	WC	7	3	3	6	0
2004	Canada	WCH	6	1	3	4	0
2006	Canada	OLY	6	2	2	4	6
Junior totals			7	1	1	2	0
Senior totals			19	6	8	14	6

== Awards and honors ==
Award	Year
CHL/QMJHL
CHL Player of the Year	2000
CHL Leading Scorer	2000
CHL Plus/Minus Award Winner	2000
CHL First All-Star Team	2000
QMJHL All-Rookie team	1998
QMJHL First All-Star Team	2000
Michel Brière Memorial Trophy	2000
Jean Béliveau Trophy	2000
Guy Lafleur Trophy	2000
AutoPro Plaque	2000
Telus Cup	2000
Paul Dumont Trophy	2000
President's Cup Champion	2000
Memorial Cup Champion	2000
Stafford Smythe Memorial Trophy	2000
Memorial Cup All-Star Team	2000
NHL
All-Rookie team	2001
YoungStars Game	2002
Stanley Cup champion	2004, 2015
Conn Smythe Trophy	2004
Lady Byng Memorial Trophy	2004
All-Star Game	2011
Tampa Bay Lightning Hall of Fame	2024

=== Records ===
- Most game-winning goals in a single playoffs seasons (7; 2004)

== See also ==
- List of NHL players with 1,000 games played

Awards and achievements
Preceded by Brian Campbell	CHL Player of the Year; 2000	Succeeded by Simon Gamache
Preceded by Jean-Sébastien Giguère	Conn Smythe Trophy winner 2004	Succeeded by Cam Ward
Preceded by Alexander Mogilny	Lady Byng Memorial Trophy winner 2004	Succeeded by Pavel Datsyuk
