= Paul Jerrard =

Canadian ice hockey defenceman (1965–2023)

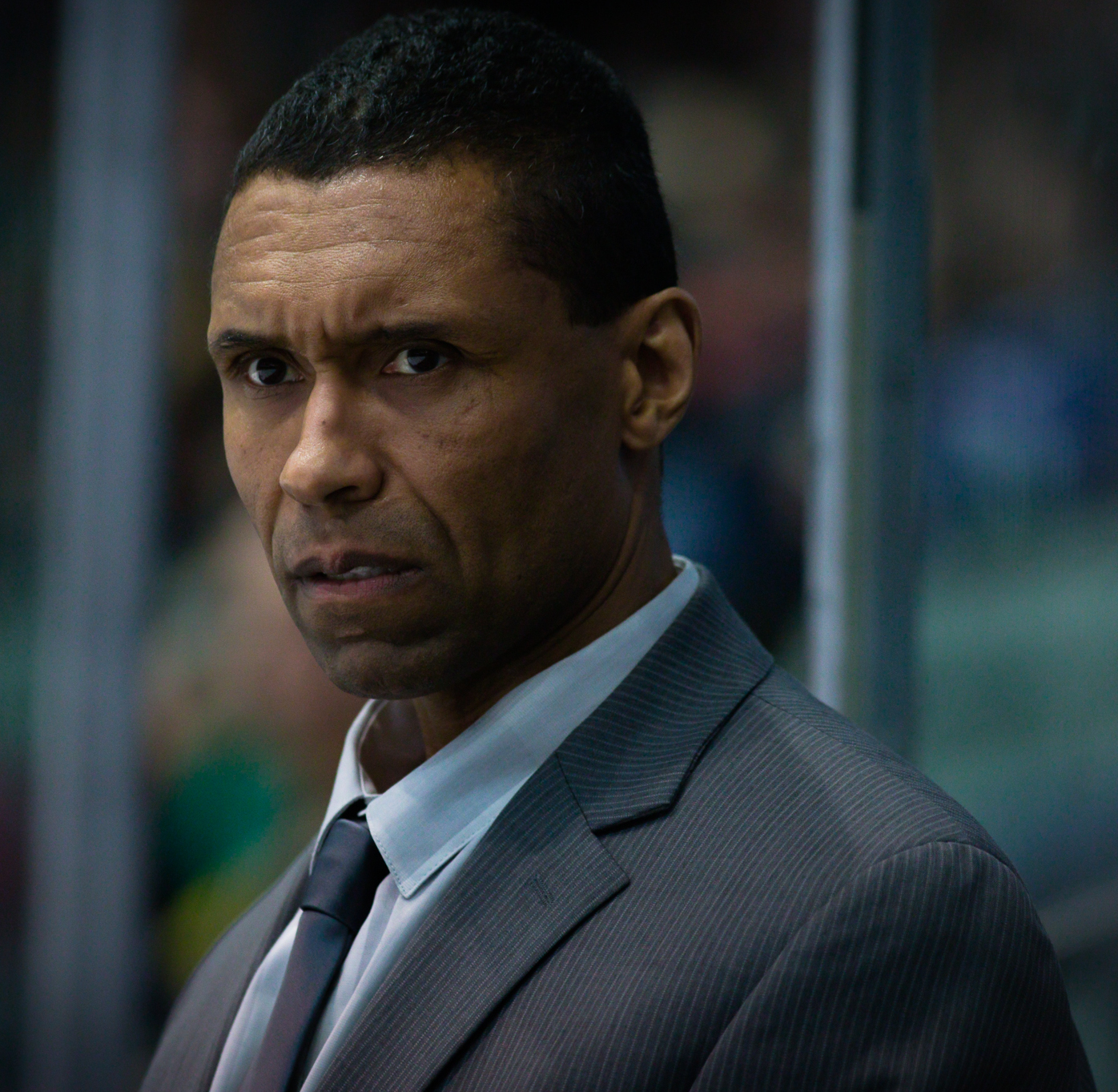
- Jerrard in 2014
- Born: April 20, 1965 Winnipeg, Manitoba, Canada
- Died: February 15, 2023 (aged 57) Omaha, Nebraska, U.S.
- Height: 6 ft 1 in (185 cm)
- Weight: 195 lb (88 kg; 13 st 13 lb)
- Position: Defence
- Shot: Right
- Played for: NHL; Minnesota North Stars; IHL; Colorado Rangers; Denver Rangers; Kalamazoo Wings; Albany Choppers; Milwaukee Admirals; Fort Wayne Komets; AHL; Hershey Bears
- NHL draft: 173rd Overall, 1983; New York Rangers
- Playing career: 1987–1997
- Coaching career

Biographical details
- Education: Lake Superior State

Coaching career (HC unless noted)
- 1997–1998: Lake Superior State (asst)
- 1998–1999: Lowell Lock Monsters (asst)
- 1999–2002: Lake Superior State (asst)
- 2002–2003: Colorado Avalanche (asst)
- 2003–2005: Hershey Bears (asst)
- 2005–2008: Iowa Stars (asst)
- 2008–2009: Iowa Chops (asst)
- 2009–2011: Texas Stars (asst)
- 2011–2013: Dallas Stars (asst)
- 2013–2016: Utica Comets (asst)
- 2016–2018: Calgary Flames (asst)
- 2018–2023: Omaha Mavericks (asst)

Paul C. Jerrard (April 20, 1965 – February 15, 2023) was a Canadian professional ice hockey defenceman who played five games in the National Hockey League for the Minnesota North Stars.

Jerrard was an assistant coach for the Omaha Mavericks of the National Collegiate Hockey Conference (NCHC). He was previously a coach for the Stars AHL affiliate, the Texas Stars. He served as assistant coach for the Utica Comets of the American Hockey League, and then, an assistant coach for the Calgary Flames.

== Playing career ==
Jerrard was drafted in the 9th round of the 1983 NHL Draft by the New York Rangers from Athol Murray College of Notre Dame in Saskatchewan, a famous hockey school in Canada. After being drafted by the New York Rangers, he left Canada to play college hockey at Lake Superior State University, where he played all four seasons for the Lakers.

After graduating from LSSU, he joined the Colorado Rangers of the IHL. He would be traded to the Minnesota North Stars in 1988, where he played five games for in the 1988–89 NHL season. After this brief stint on the NHL, he would remain in the minors for the rest of his career, ending it with the Hershey Bears in 1997.

== Coaching career ==
Jerrard began his coaching career with the Lowell Lock Monsters of the AHL in 1998. After coaching one season, he joined the staff of his alma mater, the Lake Superior State University hockey team. He spent four seasons with the Lakers before joining the Colorado Avalanche as an assistant coach. He left the next year for the Hershey Bears, where he stayed for 2 years before returning to the former Minnesota North Stars organization.

Jerrard remained with the Iowa Stars as an assistant coach before leaving in 2008. He rejoined the Dallas Stars organization in 2009 for the newly created Texas Stars, where he coached under Glen Gulutzan. When Gulutzan was promoted to become the coach of the Dallas Stars, he brought Jerrard with him. On May 14, 2013, Gulutzan and Jerrard were fired.

On August 12, 2013, Jerrard was hired by the Vancouver Canucks to be assistant coach of their AHL affiliate, the Utica Comets.

On July 6, 2016, Jerrard was hired by the Calgary Flames as an assistant coach, who focused on developing Calgary's defence corps and improving their penalty kill. He was fired on April 17, 2018, along with assistant coach Dave Cameron and head coach Glen Gulutzan.

Jerrard then took an assistant coach job with the Omaha Mavericks of the National Collegiate Hockey Conference (NCHC) on May 25, 2018.

== Personal life and death ==
Jerrard was biracial, with a white Canadian father and Jamaican mother. He died from cancer on February 15, 2023, at a hospital in Omaha, Nebraska, at the age of 57. Jerrard was survived by his wife and two daughters.

== Career statistics ==
			Regular season					Playoffs
Season	Team	League	GP	G	A	Pts	PIM	GP	G	A	Pts	PIM
1982–83	Notre Dame Hounds	SMAAAHL	60	34	37	71	150	—	—	—	—	—
1983–84	Lake Superior State University	NCAA	40	8	18	26	48	—	—	—	—	—
1984–85	Lake Superior State University	NCAA	43	9	25	34	61	—	—	—	—	—
1985–86	Lake Superior State University	NCAA	38	13	11	24	34	—	—	—	—	—
1986–87	Lake Superior State University	NCAA	35	10	19	29	56	—	—	—	—	—
1987–88	Colorado Rangers	IHL	77	20	28	48	182	11	2	4	6	40
1988–89	Denver Rangers	IHL	2	1	1	2	21	—	—	—	—	—
1988–89	Minnesota North Stars	NHL	5	0	0	0	4	—	—	—	—	—
1988–89	Kalamazoo Wings	IHL	68	15	25	40	195	6	2	1	3	37
1989–90	Kalamazoo Wings	IHL	60	9	18	27	134	7	1	1	2	11
1990–91	Kalamazoo Wings	IHL	62	10	23	33	111	7	0	0	0	13
1990–91	Albany Choppers	IHL	7	0	3	3	30	—	—	—	—	—
1991–92	Kalamazoo Wings	IHL	76	4	24	28	123	12	1	7	8	31
1992–93	Kalamazoo Wings	IHL	80	8	11	19	187	—	—	—	—	—
1993–94	Kalamazoo Wings	IHL	24	0	2	2	60	—	—	—	—	—
1993–94	Milwaukee Admirals	IHL	28	6	3	9	58	2	0	0	0	8
1994–95	Hershey Bears	AHL	66	17	11	28	118	6	0	1	1	19
1995–96	Hershey Bears	AHL	25	1	7	8	63	—	—	—	—	—
1995–96	Fort Wayne Komets	IHL	19	0	1	1	43	4	0	0	0	2
1996–97	Hershey Bears	AHL	62	3	13	16	144	22	1	5	6	24
NHL totals			5	0	0	0	4	—	—	—	—	—
AHL totals			153	21	31	52	325	28	1	6	7	43
IHL totals			503	73	139	212	1,144	49	6	13	19	142
