= Philip Hubert Smith =

- Born: 10 April 1906; Keighley, Bradford, England
- Died: 1 November 1969 (aged 63); Wharfedale, Yorkshire, England
- Occupations: automotive engineer, author, motoring journalist
- Known for: technical books
- Notable work: The High-Speed Two-Stroke Petrol Engine, The Scientific Design of Exhaust and Intake Systems, Valve Mechanisms for High-speed Engines

Philip Hubert Smith (10 April 1906 – 1 November 1969) was a British automotive engineer, author and motoring journalist.

Born in Keighley, Bradford, Smith began his career began as an automotive engineer, his qualifications including being a chartered engineer and memberships of both the IMechE and the SAE. He was also the technical editor of Motor World. It is for his technical books that he is best remembered, particularly The High-Speed Two-Stroke Petrol Engine, The Scientific Design of Exhaust and Intake Systems and (edited by L. J. K. Setright) Valve Mechanisms for High-speed Engines.

In later years he lived at Ben Rhydding, in Yorkshire. He died in Wharfedale, Yorkshire in 1969.

== Published books ==
- Smith, Philip Hubert (1963). The Greatest of all Trials. George Stevens.
- —. The Sports Car Engine. Foulis.
- —. Speed from the Sports Car. Foulis.
- —. Tuning and Maintenance of MGs. Foulis.
- — (1965). The High-Speed Two-Stroke Petrol Engine. Foulis. ISBN 085429-049-4.
- — (1968). Tuning for Speed and Tuning for Economy. Foulis.
- —. MGA and Magnette Tuning and Maintenance. Foulis.
- —. The Ford 10 Competition Engine. Foulis.
- —. Car Performance and the Choice of Conversion Equipment. Foulis.
- —. Ford Autobook One. Foulis.
- —. Imp Autobook One. Foulis.
- —. BMC Autobook One. Foulis.
- —. Triumph Autobook Two. Foulis.
- — (1971). The Scientific Design of Exhaust and Intake Systems. Bentley. ISBN 0837603099.
- — (1971). L. J. K. Setright (ed.). Valve mechanisms for high-speed engines: their design and development (2nd ed.). R. Bentley. ISBN 0-8376-0019-7.
- — (1977). Wenner, David N. (ed.). The Design and Tuning of Competition Engines (6th ed.). Bentley. ISBN 0837601401.
