= Bike (magazine) =

British motorcycling magazine

- Cover of first issue (Summer 1971)
- Editor: Martin Fitz-Gibbons
- Former editors: Mike Armitage; Hugo Wilson; Mark Williams; Mike Nicks; Peter Watson; Dave Calderwood; Brecon Quaddy; Mac McDiarmid; Martyn Moore; Roger Willis
- Categories: Motorcycles
- Frequency: Monthly
- Circulation: 29,800 (2023)
- Publisher: Bauer Consumer Media Ltd
- Founded: 1971
- Company: Bauer Media Group
- Country: Great Britain
- Based in: Peterborough
- Language: English
- Website: www.bikemagazine.co.uk

Bike is a British motorcycling magazine that was established and edited by journalist Mark Williams in 1971, originally as a one-off Car magazine special.

Taking a leaf out of Car magazine's book, Bike published "Giant Tests", namely, head-to-head comparison tests, which were innovative at the time. Before then, motorcycle journals and magazines would test bikes only individually and in isolation from other bikes. The first "Giant Test", in summer 1971, was a comparison between a BSA Rocket 3 and a Norton Commando.

Mark Williams wrote a regular column entitled "Running out of Road". Other contributors included: LJK Setright, who wrote the "Cog-swapping" column; Jim Greening who wrote the "Short Circuits" column; and the pseudonymous "Hap Spoons" who wrote "Odds & Sods". For more than 30 years the magazine featured Paul Sample's full-page comic-strip Ogri, but that transferred to Back Street Heroes magazine in the spring of 2010.

Bike is published by Bauer Consumer Media Ltd and edited by Martin Fitz-Gibbons, one of the two hosts of the Front End Chatter podcast alongside Simon Hargreaves. The magazine claims the title of "Britain's best-selling motorcycle magazine", based on circulation figures provided by the Audit Bureau of Circulations (ABC). Bike publishes a wide-ranging mix of news, tests, opinion and editorial.
