= Paul Sample (ice hockey) =

British ice hockey player

- Born: 26 May 1982 (age 43); Newcastle, England
- Height: 5 ft 10 in (178 cm)
- Weight: 182 lb (83 kg; 13 st 0 lb)
- Position: Forward
- Shot: Right
- Played for: Belfast Giants; Sheffield Steelers; Cardiff Devils; Newcastle Vipers
- National team: Great Britain
- Playing career: 2000–2011

Paul Sample (born 26 May 1982, in Newcastle upon Tyne) is a British former professional ice hockey player.

Sample played in the British National League for the Milton Keynes Kings, Cardiff Devils and the Dundee Stars in his early years before leaving the UK to train at the famous Athol Murray College of Notre Dame at the age of 14. Sample trained and played at Notre Dame for 4 years before signing for the Boston Harbourwolves when he was 18 years old.

He returned to the UK to the Elite League with the Belfast Giants in 2003, scoring 18 goals and 40 points in 61 games. Sample won a number of accolades with the Belfast Giants, including Most Valuable Player and Player of the Season. After one season in Belfast, Sample signed with the Sheffield Steelers where his offensive numbers were greatly shortened, scoring just 4 goals and 9 points in 59 games. Despite this, Sample stayed with the Steelers for a second season before rejoining the Cardiff Devils, who were now members of the Elite League. With 13 goals and 31 points in the 2006–07 season, Sample was on target to return to his high-scoring days with Belfast, until he suffered a knee injury during the 07–08 season, which kept him out for the remainder of the season and effectively ended his spell with the Devils. In 2008, Sample re-signed with the Giants.

On 27 May 2009, Sample retired from hockey to pursue other interests, but he would then come out of retirement and sign for his hometown team the Newcastle Vipers on 18 May 2010 for the 2010–11 season. After the season, however, the Vipers folded and Sample retired for a second time.

== Personal life ==
Sample currently lives in Newcastle with his partner, Lindsey. The couple has one daughter, Lola, born on 30 April 2009.
