= Rat bike =

Type of motorcycle

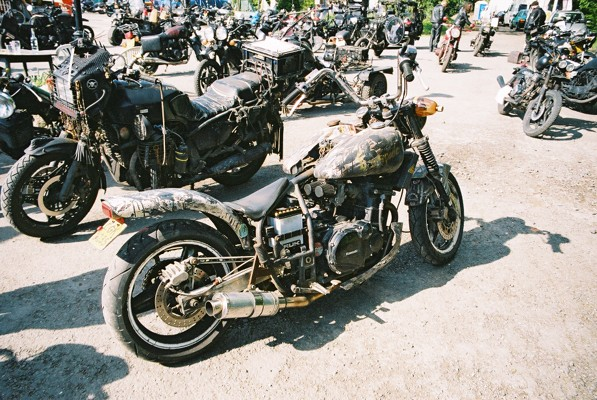
Rat bikes at the UK Rat and Survival Bike rally, 2005

Rat bikes are motorcycles that have fallen apart over time and have been kept on the road and maintained for little or no cost by employing kludge fixes and improvised repairs, with little or no consideration given to appearance. Rat-Look bikes are motorcycles that have been deliberately styled to look like ratbikes. Survival bikes, often confused with rat bikes, may look similar but are different in purpose from rat bikes; they are modified for stylistic reasons to represent a post apocalyptic vehicle.

== Rat bikes ==
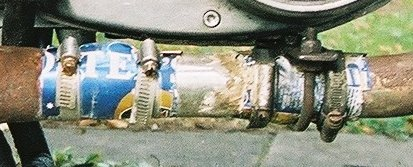
Rat bike engineering: sound joint between sections of exhaust pipe without the use of welding equipment.

The concept of keeping a motorcycle in at least minimally operational condition without consideration for appearance has probably characterized motorcycle ownership since its earliest days. The essence of a rat bike is keeping a motorbike on the road for the maximum amount of time while spending as little as possible on it. This calls for adaptation of parts that were not designed to fit the model of bike in question. While the origin of the term rat bike is unclear, it may be attributable to custom motorbike magazines, and retrospectively applied. Most rat bikes are painted matte black but this is not a requirement.

== Survival bikes ==
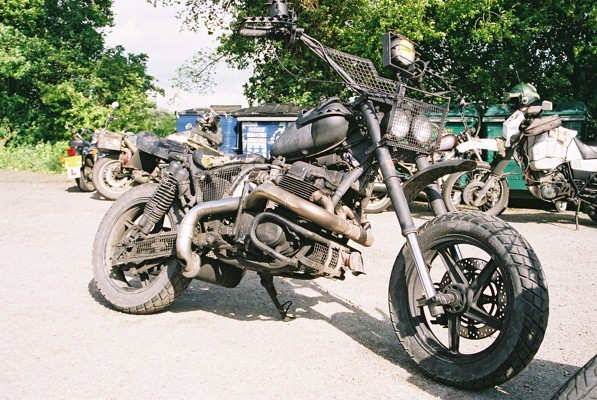
A survival bike, with an artistic exhaust system.

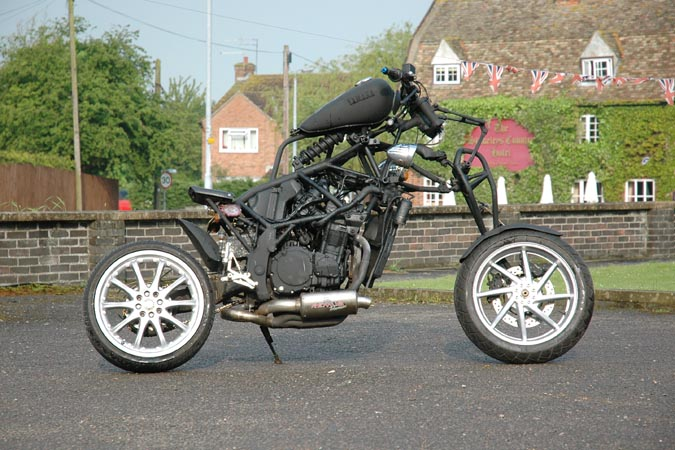
Survival bike engineering: this single-sided bike by 'exmoor customs' won "best in show" & "best engineering" at the UK Rat and Survival Bike rally, 2006.

The term "survival bike" originated in the British motorcycle press, particularly Back Street Heroes and the now-defunct AWoL in the late 1980s and early 1990s.
