= Paul Sample (cartoonist) =

British cartoonist and illustrator (1947–2026)

Paul Sample (19 February 1947 – 27 January 2026) was a British cartoonist and illustrator best known for his cartoon strip Ogri, and for the covers of paperbacks by Tom Sharpe and Flann O'Brien, posters for BBC Radio Two and advertisements for the Post Office, Ford, Dunlop, and British Airways. His fans include actor and biker Ewan McGregor.

== Life and career ==
Sample was born in Leeds, Yorkshire, England on 19 February 1947. He trained at Bradford College of Art and at the Central School of Art and Design in London, where he studied graphic arts. As a student, he landed commissions from The Times and The Sunday Times, the Daily Telegraph and Today, for which he designed and drew The Zodiac Files strip cartoon. His first commission was for Management Today in 1968, for which he was paid £45. He went on to do freelance work for Melody Maker, Rockstar, Men Only and Skateboard magazines.

Inspired by Marvel comics, he created Ogri in 1967, and the character was first published in Bike magazine. "The first strip cartoon was based on my own experience of driving up the M1 at 90mph on a Rocket Goldstar and wondering what the rattle was," recalled Sample. "Most people think Ogri is about biking but it's not, it's about life in general. The inspiration for the stories comes from riding my bike, talking to people in the pub or seeing things on the news." Ogri appeared in Bike magazine for 35 years until January 2009, when it was dropped but then taken up by Back Street Heroes (BSH), a custom motorcycle magazine. In 1995 he illustrated the bestselling book about the motor trade Four Wheels to a Fortune.

Several compilation cartoon books have been published in the UK. Sample also produced Ogri-related memorabilia, including T-shirts, coffee mugs, posters, greetings cards, and badges. The Paul Sample archive, including many original Ogri strips along with other original artwork, was auctioned in Shrewsbury in January 2010. There is also an Ogri Motorcycle Club, founded in 1978 in Germany when all the members were serving in the Army or RAF.

Sample died on 27 January 2026, at the age of 78.

== Published work ==
- Sample, Paul (1983). The Ogri Book. Dalkeith Press. ISBN 0946512019.
- Sample, Paul (1996). Ogri: v 4. John Brown Publishing. ISBN 1-870870-77-8.
- Sample, Paul (1998). The Ogri Collection. J H Haynes. ISBN 1-85960-616-4.
- Sample, Paul (2000). The Ogri Collection: No 2. J H Haynes. ISBN 1-85960-693-8.
- Sample, Paul (2005). The Ogri Collection: No 3. J H Haynes. ISBN 1-84425-229-9.
