= Sisters of Charity of St. Louis =

Roman Catholic religious congregation for women

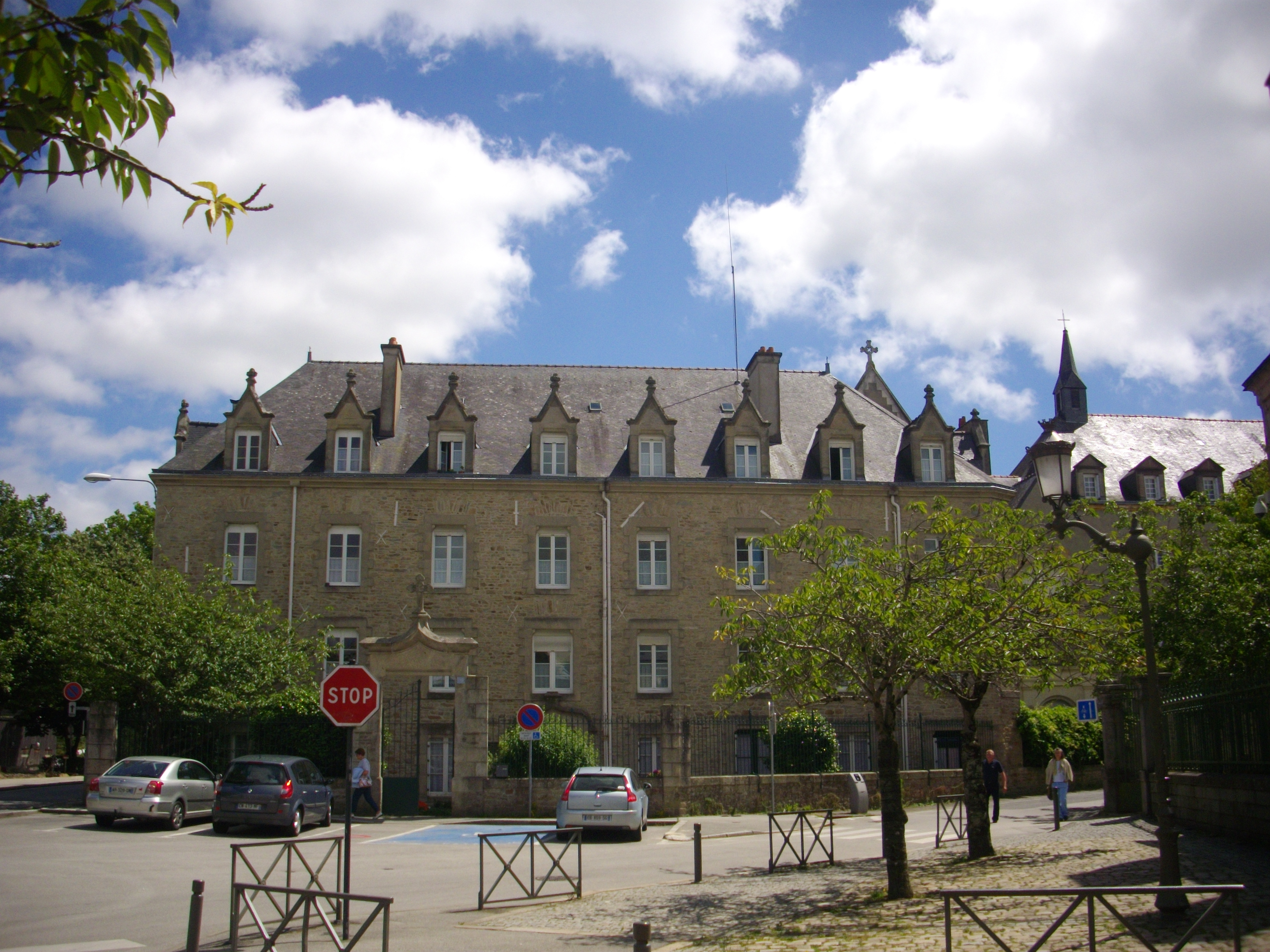
Convent des Sœurs de la Charité de Saint-Louis, Vannes

The Sisters of Charity of St. Louis (SCSL) (Soeurs de la Charité de Saint-Louis) is a Roman Catholic religious congregation. It was founded for the education of poor girls, at Vannes in Brittany, in 1803, by Madame Molé, née de Lamoignon, at the suggestion of Antoine-Xavier Maynaud de Pancemont, Bishop of Vannes.

== History ==
Louise Elisabeth de Lamoignon was born into an aristocratic family in Paris, France, on October 3, 1763. In 1805 Pope Pius VII blessed the undertaking, but the final approbation of Rome was not obtained till 1840. The founder was elected superior for life, taking the religious name "St. Louis." There were at first no lay sisters, but finding this plan did not answer, Oblates of St. Louis were selected to act in this capacity; but they were not allowed to take vows until they have been ten years in the community.

Its work was the education of poor girls who lived in orphanages attached to their convents, and to support these orphanages the sisters ran fee-paying schools. The sisters had twenty houses in France, most of which were in Brittany, but all their schools were closed by the French Government; the greater number of the sisters in consequence went to Canada, where they established a novitiate at Pont-Rouge. In 1898 they went to England, and opened a house at Minehead, in Somerset.

In 1920, they established Notre Dame des Prairies Convent and a school at St. Augustine's parish in Wilcox, Saskatchewan.

== Sources ==
- Steele, Convents of Great Britain (London, 1902)
