= Wilcox, Saskatchewan =

Village in Saskatchewan, Canada

Wilcox
- Village
- Location within Saskatchewan Location within Canada
- Coordinates: 50.092°N 104.720°W
- Country: Canada
- Province: Saskatchewan
- Region: Saskatchewan
- Census division: 6
- Rural Municipality: Bratt's Lake
- Post office Founded: 1902-11-01
- Incorporated (Village): 1907

Government
  - Mayor: Wayne Hoffart
  - Administrator: Tammi Ritchie
  - Governing body: Wilcox Village Council

Area
  - Total: 1.48 km^{2} (0.57 sq mi)

Population (2001)
  - Total: 322
  - Density: 218.2/km^{2} (565/sq mi)
- Time zone: CST
- Postal code: S0G 5E0
- Area code: 306
- Highways: Highway 39
- Website: http://www.wilcox.ca/

Wilcox (2016 population: 264) is a village in the Canadian province of Saskatchewan within the Rural Municipality of Bratt's Lake No. 129 and Census Division No. 6. It is approximately 41 kilometres (25 mi) south of the city of Regina.

Wilcox is the home of the Athol Murray College of Notre Dame, a boarding school for students in grades 9–12. The village was also home to the Notre Dame Hounds ice hockey team in the Saskatchewan Junior Hockey League. The Hounds relocated to Warman in 2025 to become the Warman Wolverines.

== History ==
In 1902, the post office formed in the Provisional District of Assiniboia West of the North West Territories and a federal electoral district then named Qu'Appelle. Saskatchewan became a province in 1905. Wilcox incorporated as a village on April 20, 1907.

A one-room school house named Wilcox School District #1633 formed at Tsp 13 Rge 21 W of the 2 Meridian.

== Demographics ==
Population history (1981–2016)
| Year | Pop. | ±% |
|---|---|---|
| 1981 | 202 | — |
| 1986 | 224 | +10.9% |
| 1991 | 230 | +2.7% |
| 1996 | 311 | +35.2% |
| 2001 | 322 | +3.5% |
| 2006 | 262 | −18.6% |
| 2011 | 339 | +29.4% |
| 2016 | 264 | −22.1% |
Source: Statistics Canada via Saskatchewan Bureau of Statistics

In the 2021 Census of Population conducted by Statistics Canada, Wilcox had a population of 261 living in 83 of its 93 total private dwellings, a change of −1.1% from its 2016 population of 264. With a land area of 1.43 km^{2} (0.55 sq mi), it had a population density of 182.5/km^{2} (472.7/sq mi) in 2021.

In the 2016 Census of Population, the Village of Wilcox recorded a population of 264 living in 80 of its 93 total private dwellings, a −28.4% change from its 2011 population of 339. With a land area of 1.48 km^{2} (0.57 sq mi), it had a population density of 178.4/km^{2} (462.0/sq mi) in 2016.

== Notable people ==
- Jon Cooper, head coach of the NHL Tampa Bay Lightning
- Ralph Goodale, former federal Minister of Public Safety and former Member of Parliament for Regina-Wascana
- Jason Kenney, Premier Of Alberta
- Brothers Nick Metz and Don Metz of the Toronto Maple Leafs both hail from Wilcox.
- Father Athol Murray founder of Notre Dame College of the Prairies, 1919
- Jaden Schwartz (2011 - current) of the NHL Seattle Kraken

== In film ==
- The 1980 film, The Hounds of Notre Dame, was shot in the village.

== See also ==
- List of communities in Saskatchewan
- List of villages in Saskatchewan
