= 2004 Stanley Cup Final =

2004 ice hockey championship series

| | 1 | 2 | 3 | 4 | 5 | 6 | 7 | Total |
|---|---|---|---|---|---|---|---|---|
| Tampa Bay Lightning | 1 | 4 | 0 | 1 | 2* | 3** | 2 | 4 |
| Calgary Flames | 4 | 1 | 3 | 0 | 3* | 2** | 1 | 3 |
- * – Denotes overtime period(s)
- Location(s): Tampa: St. Pete Times Forum (1, 2, 5, 7); Calgary: Pengrowth Saddledome (3, 4, 6)
- Coaches: Tampa Bay: John Tortorella; Calgary: Darryl Sutter
- Captains: Tampa Bay: Dave Andreychuk; Calgary: Jarome Iginla
- National anthems: Tampa Bay: Brooke Hogan; Calgary: Heather Liscano
- Referees: Bill McCreary (1, 3, 5, 6, 7); Stephen Walkom (1, 2, 5, 6); Kerry Fraser (3, 4, 7); Brad Watson (2, 4)
- Dates: May 25 – June 7, 2004
- MVP: Brad Richards (Lightning)
- Series-winning goal: Ruslan Fedotenko (14:38, second)
- Hall of Famers: Lightning: Dave Andreychuk (2017); Martin St. Louis (2018); Flames: Jarome Iginla (2020); Officials: Bill McCreary (2014)
- Networks: Canada: (English): CBC (French): RDS; United States: (English): ESPN (1–2), ABC (3–7)
- Announcers: (CBC) Bob Cole and Harry Neale (RDS) Pierre Houde and Yvon Pedneault (ESPN/ABC) Gary Thorne, Bill Clement, and John Davidson (NHL International) Dave Strader and Joe Micheletti

The 2004 Stanley Cup Finals was the championship series of the National Hockey League's (NHL) 2003–04 season, and the culmination of the 2004 Stanley Cup Playoffs. The Eastern Conference champion Tampa Bay Lightning defeated the Western Conference champion Calgary Flames in seven games for their first Stanley Cup in franchise history, becoming the southernmost team to win the Stanley Cup until their in-state Rivals Florida Panthers won the Cup in 2024. It was Tampa Bay's first-ever appearance in the Finals in their twelfth season since entering the league in 1992. For Calgary, it was the team's third appearance, and first since their championship season of 1989. This was one of the few Stanley Cup Finals in which the losing team scored more goals.

Lightning owner William Davidson became the first owner in sports history to win two championships in one year as eight days after this series ended, the other team that Davidson owned (the Detroit Pistons of the NBA) won the NBA title in five games over the Los Angeles Lakers. This was the last Stanley Cup Final to be played for two years, as the 2004–05 NHL lockout began three months after the end of this series, lasting over ten months and leading to the cancellation of the following season, with the league not returning to play for the Stanley Cup until 2006. This was the last of three consecutive Finals to feature a team making its debut appearance.

== Paths to the 2004 Stanley Cup Finals ==
=== Tampa Bay Lightning ===
Tampa Bay finished the season with 106 points and entered the playoffs as the Eastern Conference’s top seed. They defeated the eighth, seventh, and third-seeded teams, beating the New York Islanders 4–1, the Montreal Canadiens 4–0 and the Philadelphia Flyers 4–3, in order, and they advanced to the Finals for the first time in franchise history since their establishment in 1992. It was also the third year in a row in which a team made their debut Finals appearance, after the Carolina Hurricanes and Mighty Ducks of Anaheim.

=== Calgary Flames ===
Calgary finished the season with 94 points, qualifying for the playoffs for the first time since 1996. As the sixth seed, they defeated the Western Conference's top three seeded teams, which were the Vancouver Canucks 4–3, the Detroit Red Wings 4–2 and the San Jose Sharks 4–2, in order, and made it to the Finals for the first time since 1989. This also marked the first time a Canadian team made it to the Finals since the Vancouver Canucks lost to the New York Rangers in the 1994 Stanley Cup Final.

== Game summaries ==
=== Game one ===
| May 25 | Calgary Flames | 4–1 | Tampa Bay Lightning | St. Pete Times Forum | Recap |

The first game, at St. Pete Times Forum, saw the Flames win 4–1. Dave Andreychuk began the game with a record 634 career goals without a Stanley Cup Final appearance. Calgary only got 19 shots off against the Lightning defence, but more than one-fifth found the net. Martin Gelinas got Calgary on the board early, and they extended the lead to 3–0 in the second period on goals by Jarome Iginla, his 11th of the playoffs, and Stephane Yelle. Chris Simon added the fourth and final Calgary goal after Tampa Bay's Martin St. Louis scored the lone Lightning goal.

Scoring summary
| Period | Team | Goal | Assist(s) | Time | Score |
|---|---|---|---|---|---|
| 1st | CGY | Martin Gelinas (7) | Craig Conroy (11) and Andrew Ference (2) | 03:02 | 1–0 CGY |
| 2nd | CGY | Jarome Iginla (11) – sh | Unassisted | 15:21 | 2–0 CGY |
| 2nd | CGY | Stephane Yelle (3) | Unassisted | 18:08 | 3–0 CGY |
| 3rd | TBL | Martin St. Louis (6) – pp | Brad Richards (10) and Dan Boyle (7) | 04:13 | 3–1 CGY |
| 3rd | CGY | Chris Simon (4) – pp | Oleg Saprykin (2) and Robyn Regehr (5) | 19:40 | 4–1 CGY |
Penalty summary
| Period | Team | Player | Penalty | Time | PIM |
| 1st | CGY | Stephane Yelle | Interference | 11:32 | 2:00 |
| 1st | TBL | Pavel Kubina | Holding | 18:52 | 2:00 |
| 2nd | CGY | Robyn Regehr | Holding | 09:22 | 2:00 |
| 2nd | CGY | Andrew Ference | Hooking | 14:48 | 2:00 |
| 3rd | CGY | Ville Nieminen | Roughing | 03:05 | 2:00 |
| 3rd | TBL | Andre Roy | Roughing | 04:30 | 2:00 |
| 3rd | TBL | Cory Stillman | Roughing | 04:30 | 2:00 |
| 3rd | CGY | Shean Donovan | Roughing | 04:30 | 2:00 |
| 3rd | CGY | Oleg Saprykin | Unsportsmanlike conduct | 07:55 | 2:00 |
| 3rd | TBL | Ruslan Fedotenko | Roughing | 17:50 | 2:00 |
| 3rd | TBL | Martin St. Louis | High-sticking | 19:06 | 2:00 |

Shots by period
| Team | 1 | 2 | 3 | Total |
|---|---|---|---|---|
| Calgary | 5 | 10 | 4 | 19 |
| Tampa Bay | 10 | 8 | 6 | 24 |

=== Game two ===
| May 27 | Calgary Flames | 1–4 | Tampa Bay Lightning | St. Pete Times Forum | Recap |

Game 2 saw the same final score, but this time, it was Tampa Bay winning a clutch game to tie the series, 1–1, headed to Calgary. Ruslan Fedotenko's 10th goal of the postseason got the Lightning on the board first, and Tampa Bay used three third-period goals, coming from Brad Richards, Dan Boyle, and St. Louis, respectively, to blast the game open. The lone Calgary goal was scored by Ville Nieminen. During the third period, Lightning forward Andre Roy accidentally knocked over Flames goaltender Miikka Kiprusoff; no penalty was called. In response, Chris Simon engaged in a fight with Roy, and Lightning forward Chris Dingman attempted to fight Flames defenseman Jordan Leopold, ensuing a scrum. Dingman was given a double minor for roughing and was ejected from the game, while Simon was given a minor penalty for instigator as well as a 10-minute misconduct. With just 12 seconds remaining in the game, Martin Gelinas checked Pavel Kubina from behind, resulting in a major penalty and Gelinas being ejected from the game. The Lightning would go on to win the game 4–1, giving them a 2–0 lead in the series.

These Finals would be the last until 2013 to be tied after two games. The team with home ice in games one and two held a 2–0 edge in every Final between 2006 and 2011. In 2012, the Los Angeles Kings won the first two games at New Jersey.

Scoring summary
| Period | Team | Goal | Assist(s) | Time | Score |
|---|---|---|---|---|---|
| 1st | TBL | Ruslan Fedotenko (10) | Jassen Cullimore (2) and Vincent Lecavalier (5) | 07:10 | 1–0 TBL |
| 2nd | None | | | | |
| 3rd | TBL | Brad Richards (9) | Dave Andreychuk (10) and Martin St. Louis (14) | 02:51 | 2–0 TBL |
| 3rd | TB | Dan Boyle (2) | Brad Richards (11) and Fredrik Modin (10) | 04:00 | 3–0 TBL |
| 3rd | TB | Martin St. Louis (7) – pp | Vincent Lecavalier (6) and Dave Andreychuk (11) | 05:58 | 4–0 TBL |
| 3rd | CGY | Ville Nieminen (4) – pp | Shean Donovan (5) and Robyn Regehr (6) | 12:21 | 4–1 TBL |
Penalty summary
| Period | Team | Player | Penalty | Time | PIM |
| 1st | TBL | Andre Roy | Interference | 02:00 | 2:00 |
| 1st | TBL | Dimitri Afanasenkov | Boarding | 07:58 | 2:00 |
| 1st | CGY | Dave Lowry | Hooking – Obstruction | 10:21 | 2:00 |
| 1st | TBL | Vincent Lecavalier | High-sticking | 13:33 | 2:00 |
| 1st | CGY | Shean Donovan | Holding | 15:04 | 2:00 |
| 1st | TBL | Bench (served by Dimitri Afanasenkov) | Too many men on the ice | 16:59 | 2:00 |
| 2nd | TBL | Fredrik Modin | Hooking – Obstruction | 00:53 | 2:00 |
| 2nd | CGY | Oleg Saprykin | Goaltender interference | 19:22 | 2:00 |
| 3rd | CGY | Stephane Yelle | Cross-checking | 00:37 | 2:00 |
| 3rd | TBL | Brad Richards | Roughing | 05:50 | 2:00 |
| 3rd | TBL | Dan Boyle | Roughing | 05:50 | 2:00 |
| 3rd | TBL | Cory Stillman | Fightning – major | 05:50 | 5:00 |
| 3rd | CGY | Chuck Kobasew | Roughing | 05:50 | 2:00 |
| 3rd | CGY | Andrew Ference | Fighting – major | 05:50 | 5:00 |
| 3rd | CGY | Andrew Ference | Unsportsmanlike conduct | 05:50 | 2:00 |
| 3rd | CGY | Chris Clark | Roughing | 05:50 | 2:00 |
| 3rd | CGY | Chris Simon | Cross-checking | 05:50 | 2:00 |
| 3rd | TBL | Andre Roy | Fighting – major | 08:31 | 5:00 |
| 3rd | TBL | Chris Dingman | Game misconduct | 08:31 | 10:00 |
| 3rd | TBL | Chris Dingman | Misconduct | 08:31 | 10:00 |
| 3rd | TBL | Chris Dingman | Roughing – double minor | 08:31 | 4:00 |
| 3rd | CGY | Chris Simon | Misconduct | 08:31 | 10:00 |
| 3rd | CGY | Chris Simon | Fighting – major | 08:31 | 5:00 |
| 3rd | CGY | Chris Simon | Instigator | 08:31 | 2:00 |
| 3rd | TBL | Tim Taylor | Holding | 10:35 | 2:00 |
| 3rd | CGY | Chuck Kobasew | Interference | 14:27 | 2:00 |
| 3rd | CGY | Robyn Regehr | Holding | 15:13 | 2:00 |
| 3rd | CGY | Martin Gelinas | Checking from behind – major | 19:48 | 5:00 |
| 3rd | CGY | Martin Gelinas | Game misconduct | 19:48 | 10:00 |
| 3rd | CGY | Chuck Kobasew | Misconduct | 20:00 | 10:00 |
| 3rd | TBL | Andre Roy | Misconduct | 20:00 | 10:00 |
| 3rd | TBL | Pavel Kubina | Misconduct | 20:00 | 10:00 |

Shots by period
| Team | 1 | 2 | 3 | Total |
|---|---|---|---|---|
| Calgary | 6 | 9 | 4 | 19 |
| Tampa Bay | 8 | 10 | 13 | 31 |

=== Game three ===
| May 29 | Tampa Bay Lightning | 0–3 | Calgary Flames | Pengrowth Saddledome | Recap |

The series shifted to the Pengrowth Saddledome in Calgary, where Miikka Kiprusoff and the Calgary defence completely stonewalled the Tampa Bay attack, which only took 21 shots in a 3–0 Flames victory. Simon scored the first Calgary goal in the second period, and Shean Donovan and Iginla added goals to ice the game.

Scoring summary
| Period | Team | Goal | Assist(s) | Time | Score |
|---|---|---|---|---|---|
| 1st | None | | | | |
| 2nd | CGY | Chris Simon (5) – pp | Jarome Iginla (8) and Jordan Leopold (9) | 13:53 | 1–0 CGY |
| 2nd | CGY | Shean Donovan (5) | Unassisted | 17:09 | 2–0 CGY |
| 3rd | CGY | Jarome Iginla (12) – pp | Robyn Regehr (7) and Chris Simon (2) | 18:28 | 3–0 CGY |
Penalty summary
| Period | Team | Player | Penalty | Time | PIM |
| 1st | CGY | Martin Gelinas | Elbowing | 00:27 | 2:00 |
| 1st | TBL | Brad Lukowich | Cross-checking | 03:50 | 2:00 |
| 1st | CGY | Jarome Iginla | Fighting – major | 06:17 | 5:00 |
| 1st | TBL | Vincent Lecavalier | Fighting – major | 06:17 | 5:00 |
| 1st | CGY | Chris Clark | Tripping | 07:10 | 2:00 |
| 1st | TBL | Dan Boyle | Hooking | 09:36 | 2:00 |
| 1st | CGY | Martin Gelinas | Holding the stick | 17:03 | 2:00 |
| 2nd | TBL | Brad Lukowich | Slashing | 13:03 | 2:00 |
| 3rd | CGY | Shean Donovan | Holding | 04:05 | 2:00 |
| 3rd | TBL | Cory Sarich | Slashing | 17:23 | 2:00 |
| 3rd | TBL | Cory Sarich | Misconduct | 19:16 | 10:00 |

Shots by period
| Team | 1 | 2 | 3 | Total |
|---|---|---|---|---|
| Tampa Bay | 5 | 6 | 10 | 21 |
| Calgary | 2 | 12 | 4 | 18 |

=== Game four ===
| May 31 | Tampa Bay Lightning | 1–0 | Calgary Flames | Pengrowth Saddledome | Recap |

With a chance to take a commanding 3–1 series lead, Calgary was shut out by Lightning goalie Nikolai Khabibulin, who recorded his fifth shutout of the postseason, making 29 saves in a 1–0 Tampa Bay victory, with the game's lone goal being scored by Brad Richards three minutes into the game on a two-man advantage.

With 4:13 left in the game, Ville Nieminen checked Vincent Lecavalier into the boards, drawing a five-minute major penalty for boarding, a game misconduct penalty, and an eventual game five suspension. Meanwhile, fans at the Pengrowth Saddledome angrily booed referees Kerry Fraser and Brad Watson throughout most of the contest. They were originally also scheduled to work game six in Calgary but the league eventually decided to replace them.

Scoring summary
| Period | Team | Goal | Assist(s) | Time | Score |
|---|---|---|---|---|---|
| 1st | TBL | Brad Richards (10) – pp | Dave Andreychuk (12) and Dan Boyle (8) | 02:48 | 1–0 TB |
| 2nd | None | | | | |
| 3rd | None | | | | |
Penalty summary
| Period | Team | Player | Penalty | Time | PIM |
| 1st | CGY | Chris Clark | Cross-checking | 01:52 | 2:00 |
| 1st | CGY | Mike Commodore | Holding | 01:52 | 2:00 |
| 1st | TBL | Vincent Lecavalier | Tripping | 07:50 | 2:00 |
| 1st | TBL | Dimitri Afanasenkov | Elbowing | 12:52 | 2:00 |
| 1st | CGY | Chuck Kobasew | Holding | 16:40 | 2:00 |
| 2nd | CGY | Krzysztof Oliwa | Holding | 05:07 | 2:00 |
| 3rd | CGY | Ville Nieminen | Boarding – major | 15:47 | 5:00 |
| 3rd | CGY | Ville Nieminen | Game misconduct | 15:47 | 10:00 |

Shots by period
| Team | 1 | 2 | 3 | Total |
|---|---|---|---|---|
| Tampa Bay | 12 | 7 | 5 | 24 |
| Calgary | 12 | 5 | 12 | 29 |

=== Game five ===
| June 3 | Calgary Flames | 3–2 | OT | Tampa Bay Lightning | St. Pete Times Forum | Recap |

The series returned to Tampa Bay tied, 2–2, for a critical game five, and Calgary pulled off a 3–2 overtime victory to move within one win from the Stanley Cup. After Gelinas and St. Louis traded goals in the first period, Iginla scored for Calgary late in the second period. However, Fredrik Modin tied the game for the Lightning 37 seconds into the third period. The 2–2 score held until after 14:40 had gone by in overtime, when Oleg Saprykin's first goal since the first round won the game for the Flames.

Scoring summary
| Period | Team | Goal | Assist(s) | Time | Score |
|---|---|---|---|---|---|
| 1st | CGY | Martin Gelinas (8) – pp | Toni Lydman (1) and Steve Montador (2) | 02:13 | 1–0 CGY |
| 1st | TBL | Martin St. Louis (8) | Martin Cibak (1) and Chris Dingman (1) | 19:26 | 1–1 |
| 2nd | CGY | Jarome Iginla (13) | Unassisted | 15:10 | 2–1 CGY |
| 3rd | TBL | Fredrik Modin (8) – pp | Brad Richards (12) and Dave Andreychuk (13) | 00:37 | 2–2 |
| OT | CGY | Oleg Saprykin (3) | Jarome Iginla (9) and Marcus Nilson (7) | 14:40 | 3–2 CGY |
Penalty summary
| Period | Team | Player | Penalty | Time | PIM |
| 1st | TBL | Fredrik Modin | High-sticking | 01:43 | 2:00 |
| 1st | CGY | Dave Lowry | Interference | 08:41 | 2:00 |
| 1st | TBL | Andre Roy | Roughing | 13:18 | 2:00 |
| 2nd | None | | | | |
| 3rd | CGY | Rhett Warrener | Holding the stick | 00:31 | 2:00 |
| OT | None | | | | |

Shots by period
| Team | 1 | 2 | 3 | OT | Total |
|---|---|---|---|---|---|
| Calgary | 11 | 14 | 4 | 7 | 36 |
| Tampa Bay | 9 | 3 | 8 | 8 | 28 |

=== Game six ===
| June 5 | Tampa Bay Lightning | 3–2 | 2OT | Calgary Flames | Pengrowth Saddledome | Recap |

Back to Calgary for game six, each team scored two second-period goals, with Richards scoring two for the Lightning and Chris Clark and Marcus Nilson for the Flames. In the third period, there was a dispute over a Martin Gelinas redirect that appeared to have gone in off of his skate. A review from one camera angle appeared to show the puck crossing the goal line before Khabibulin's pad dragged it out, though some (including Lightning Tim Taylor) argue that the puck had not only been knocked several inches above the goal line (thus making there appear to be white ice between the puck and the goal line) in front of Khabibulin's pad, but that it was also "kicked" by Gelinas. The play was never reviewed. However, the ABC broadcast of Game 7 showed a CGI video analysis of the play, which estimated that the puck did not completely cross the line, and that the call on the ice was correct. The CGI company that did the analysis of the video was based out of Calgary. The game entered overtime with the Flames needing only a goal to win the Stanley Cup. However, thirty-three seconds into the second overtime, St. Louis put in the game-winner for the Lightning to force a winner-take-all seventh game in Tampa.

Scoring summary
| Period | Team | Goal | Assist(s) | Time | Score |
|---|---|---|---|---|---|
| 1st | None | | | | |
| 2nd | TBL | Brad Richards (11) – pp | Martin St. Louis (15) and Ruslan Fedotenko (2) | 04:17 | 1–0 TBL |
| 2nd | CGY | Chris Clark (3) | Stephane Yelle (3) and Ville Nieminen (4) | 09:05 | 1–1 |
| 2nd | TBL | Brad Richards (12) – pp | Unassisted | 10:52 | 2–1 TBL |
| 2nd | CGY | Marcus Nilson (4) | Oleg Saprykin (3) and Andrew Ference (3) | 17:49 | 2–2 |
| 3rd | None | | | | |
| OT | None | | | | |
| 2OT | TBL | Martin St. Louis (9) | Brad Richards (13) and Tim Taylor (3) | 00:33 | 3–2 TBL |
Penalty summary
| Period | Team | Player | Penalty | Time | PIM |
| 1st | CGY | Andrew Ference | Hooking | 11:59 | 2:00 |
| 1st | TBL | Dave Andreychuk | Elbowing | 11:59 | 2:00 |
| 1st | TBL | Cory Sarich | Interference | 16:34 | 2:00 |
| 1st | TBL | Ruslan Fedotenko | Interference | 19:01 | 2:00 |
| 2nd | CGY | Jordan Leopold | Interference | 02:34 | 2:00 |
| 2nd | CGY | Craig Conroy | Hooking – Obstruction | 09:25 | 2:00 |
| 3rd | CGY | Craig Conroy | Hooking | 00:45 | 2:00 |
| 3rd | CGY | Chris Simon | Cross-checking | 08:38 | 2:00 |
| 3rd | TBL | Jassen Cullimore | Interference | 11:18 | 2:00 |
| OT | None | | | | |
| 2OT | None | | | | |

Shots by period
| Team | 1 | 2 | 3 | OT | 2OT | Total |
|---|---|---|---|---|---|---|
| Tampa Bay | 6 | 5 | 7 | 7 | 2 | 27 |
| Calgary | 6 | 13 | 7 | 7 | 0 | 33 |

=== Game seven ===
| June 7 | Calgary Flames | 1–2 | Tampa Bay Lightning | St. Pete Times Forum | Recap |

In a tense Game 7, Fedotenko scored goals for Tampa Bay late in the first period and late in the second period for a 2–0 lead. After Conroy scored to narrow the deficit to 2–1, Calgary bombarded Khabibulin after taking only seven shots in the first two periods. After the Conroy goal, Khabibulin stopped 16 Calgary shots. The series ended as Flames center Marcus Nilson missed a last-second opportunity to force overtime. Tampa Bay won the game, 2–1, and the Stanley Cup.

Scoring summary
| Period | Team | Goal | Assist(s) | Time | Score |
|---|---|---|---|---|---|
| 1st | TBL | Ruslan Fedotenko (11) – pp | Brad Richards (14) and Fredrik Modin (11) | 13:31 | 1–0 TB |
| 2nd | TBL | Ruslan Fedotenko (12) | Vincent Lecavalier (7) and Cory Stillman (5) | 14:38 | 2–0 TB |
| 3rd | CGY | Craig Conroy (6) – pp | Jordan Leopold (10) | 09:21 | 2–1 TB |
Penalty summary
| Period | Team | Player | Penalty | Time | PIM |
| 1st | CGY | Marcus Nilson | Slashing | 01:10 | 2:00 |
| 1st | CGY | Oleg Saprykin | Tripping | 11:59 | 2:00 |
| 1st | TBL | Jassen Cullimore | Interference | 19:42 | 2:00 |
| 2nd | CGY | Martin Gelinas | Boarding | 04:16 | 2:00 |
| 2nd | CGY | Chris Clark | Tripping | 18:46 | 2:00 |
| 3rd | TBL | Nolan Pratt | Interference | 08:50 | 2:00 |
| 3rd | CGY | Andrew Ference | Charging | 18:59 | 2:00 |
| 3rd | TBL | Dave Andreychuk | Tripping | 19:37 | 2:00 |

Shots by period
| Team | 1 | 2 | 3 | Total |
|---|---|---|---|---|
| Calgary | 3 | 4 | 10 | 17 |
| Tampa Bay | 6 | 4 | 5 | 15 |

This is the last Finals appearance for the Flames. The Lightning returned to the finals in 2015.

== Team rosters ==
Years indicated in boldface under the "Finals appearance" column signify that the player won the Stanley Cup in the given year.

=== Calgary Flames ===
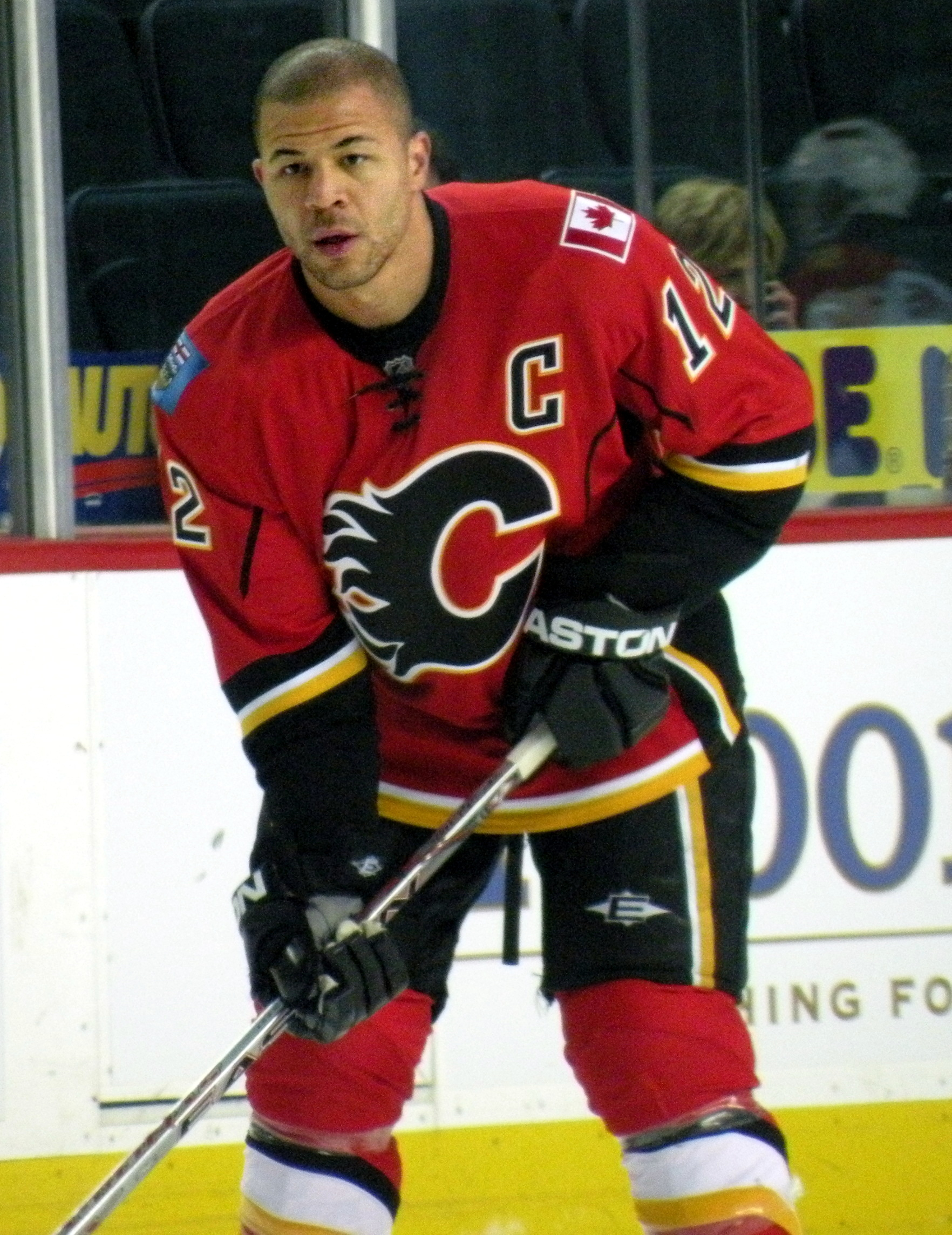
Jarome Iginla captained the Flames to their first Final appearance in fifteen years.

| # | Nat | Player | Position | Hand | Age | Acquired | Place of birth | Finals appearance |
|---|---|---|---|---|---|---|---|---|
| 17 | (United States) | Chris Clark | RW | R | 28 | 1994 | South Windsor, Connecticut | first |
| 2 | (Canada) | Mike Commodore | D | R | 24 | 2003 | Fort Saskatchewan, Alberta | second (2001) |
| 22 | (United States) | Craig Conroy – **A** | C | R | 32 | 2001 | Potsdam, New York | first |
| 16 | (Canada) | Shean Donovan | RW | R | 29 | 2003 | Timmins, Ontario | first |
| 21 | (Canada) | Andrew Ference | D | L | 25 | 2003 | Edmonton, Alberta | first |
| 23 | (Canada) | Martin Gelinas | LW | L | 34 | 2002 | Shawinigan, Quebec | fourth (**1990**, 1994, 2002) |
| 12 | (Canada) | Jarome Iginla – **C** | RW | R | 26 | 1995 | Edmonton, Alberta | first |
| 34 | (Finland) | Miikka Kiprusoff | G | L | 27 | 2003 | Turku, Finland | first |
| 7 | (Canada) | Chuck Kobasew | RW | R | 22 | 2001 | Vancouver, British Columbia | first |
| 4 | (United States) | Jordan Leopold | D | L | 23 | 2000 | Golden Valley, Minnesota | first |
| 10 | (Canada) | Dave Lowry | LW | L | 39 | 2000 | Sudbury, Ontario | second (1996) |
| 32 | (Finland) | Toni Lydman | D | L | 26 | 1996 | Lahti, Finland | first |
| 5 | (Canada) | Steve Montador | D | R | 24 | 2000 | Vancouver | first |
| 24 | (Finland) | Ville Nieminen | LW | L | 27 | 2004 | Tampere, Finland | second (**2001**) |
| 26 | (Sweden) | Marcus Nilson | LW | R | 26 | 2004 | Bålsta, Sweden | first |
| 33 | (Poland) | Krzysztof Oliwa | LW | L | 31 | 2003 | Tychy, Poland | second (**2000**) |
| 28 | (Canada) | Robyn Regehr – **A** | D | L | 24 | 1999 | Recife, Brazil | first |
| 19 | (Russia) | Oleg Saprykin | LW | L | 23 | 1999 | Moscow, U.S.S.R. | first |
| 15 | (Canada) | Chris Simon | LW | L | 32 | 2004 | Wawa, Ontario | third (**1996**, 1998) |
| 1 | (Czechoslovakia) | Roman Turek | G | R | 34 | 2001 | Strakonice, Czechoslovakia | second (**1999**) |
| 44 | (Canada) | Rhett Warrener | D | R | 28 | 2003 | Shaunavon, Saskatchewan | third (1996, 1999) |
| 11 | (Canada) | Stephane Yelle | C | L | 30 | 2002 | Ottawa, Ontario | third (**1996**, **2001**) |

=== Tampa Bay Lightning ===
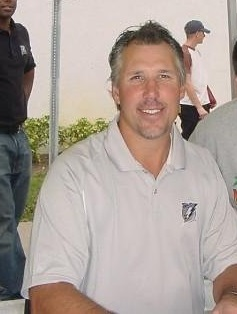
Dave Andreychuk (pictured in 2008) captained the Lightning to their first Final appearance in franchise history.

| # | Nat | Player | Position | Hand | Age | Acquired | Place of birth | Finals appearance |
|---|---|---|---|---|---|---|---|---|
| 29 | (Russia) | Dmitry Afanasenkov | LW | R | 24 | 1998 | Arkhangelsk, U.S.S.R. | first |
| 25 | (Canada) | Dave Andreychuk – **C** | LW | R | 40 | 2001 | Hamilton, Ontario | first |
| 22 | (Canada) | Dan Boyle | D | R | 27 | 2002 | Ottawa, Ontario | first |
| 8 | (Slovakia) | Martin Cibak | C | L | 24 | 1998 | Liptovský Mikuláš, Czechoslovakia | first |
| 7 | (United States) | Ben Clymer | RW | R | 26 | 1999 | Bloomington, Minnesota | first |
| 5 | (Canada) | Jassen Cullimore | D | L | 31 | 1998 | Simcoe, Ontario | first |
| 11 | (Canada) | Chris Dingman | LW | L | 27 | 2002 | Edmonton, Alberta | second (**2001**) |
| 17 | (Ukraine) | Ruslan Fedotenko | LW | L | 25 | 2003 | Kyiv, U.S.S.R. | first |
| 47 | (United States) | John Grahame | G | L | 28 | 2003 | Denver, Colorado | first |
| 35 | (Russia) | Nikolai Khabibulin | G | L | 31 | 2001 | Sverdlovsk, U.S.S.R. | first |
| 13 | (Czech Republic) | Pavel Kubina | D | R | 27 | 1996 | Čeladná, Czechoslovakia | first |
| 4 | (Canada) | Vincent Lecavalier – **A** | C | L | 24 | 1998 | Île Bizard, Quebec | first |
| 37 | (Canada) | Brad Lukowich | D | L | 27 | 2002 | Cranbrook, British Columbia | third (**1999**, 2000) |
| 33 | (Sweden) | Fredrik Modin – **A** | LW | L | 29 | 1999 | Sundsvall, Sweden | first |
| 44 | (Canada) | Nolan Pratt | D | L | 28 | 2001 | Fort McMurray, Alberta | second (**2001**) |
| 19 | (Canada) | Brad Richards | C | L | 24 | 1998 | Murray Harbour, Prince Edward Island | first |
| 36 | (United States) | Andre Roy | RW | L | 29 | 2002 | Port Chester, New York | first |
| 21 | (Canada) | Cory Sarich | D | R | 25 | 2000 | Saskatoon, Saskatchewan | first |
| 26 | (Canada) | Martin St. Louis | RW | L | 28 | 2000 | Laval, Quebec | first |
| 61 | (Canada) | Cory Stillman | LW | L | 30 | 2003 | Peterborough, Ontario | first |
| 55 | (Canada) | Darryl Sydor | D | L | 32 | 2004 | Edmonton, Alberta | fourth (1993, **1999**, 2000) |
| 27 | (Canada) | Tim Taylor | C | L | 35 | 2001 | Stratford, Ontario | second (**1997**) |

== Stanley Cup engraving ==
The 2004 Stanley Cup was presented to Lightning captain Dave Andreychuk by NHL Commissioner Gary Bettman following the Lightning's 2–1 win over the Flames in game seven

The following Lightning players and staff had their names engraved on the Stanley Cup

2003–04 Tampa Bay Lightning

=== Players ===
Centres

- 4 Vincent Lecavalier (A)
- 8 Martin Cibak
- 9 Eric Perrin*
- 19 Brad Richards
- 27 Tim Taylor

Wingers

- 7 Ben Clymer
- 11 Chris Dingman
- 17 Ruslan Fedotenko
- 25 Dave Andreychuk (Captain)
- 26 Martin St. Louis
- 29 Dmitry Afanasenkov
- 33 Fredrik Modin (A)
- 36 Andre Roy
- 61 Cory Stillman

Defencemen

- 2 Stanislav Neckar*
- 5 Jassen Cullimore
- 13 Pavel Kubina
- 21 Cory Sarich
- 22 Dan Boyle
- 37 Brad Lukowich
- 38 Darren Rumble*
- 44 Nolan Pratt
- 55 Darryl Sydor

Goaltenders

- 35 Nikolai Khabibulin
- 47 John Grahame
- * Exemption granted to engrave the name of a player who did not automatically qualify. (Note: Automatic qualification for a player's name to be engraved on the Stanley Cup: Playing in (for a goaltender, dressing for) at least one Stanley Cup Final game or at least half of the Stanley Cup winning team's regular season games.)

=== Coaching and administrative staff ===
- William Davidson (Owner), Thomas Wilson (Governor), Ronald Campbell (President)
- Jay Feaster (Vice President/General Manager), John Tortorella (Head Coach), Craig Ramsay (Associate Coach), Jeff Reese (Asst. Coach)
- Nigel Kirwan (Video Coach), Eric Lawson (Strength-Conditioning Coach), Tom Mulligan (Medical Trainer), Adam Rambo (Asst. Medical Trainer), Ray Thill (Equipment Manager)
- Dana Heinze (Asst. Equipment Manager), Jim Pickard (Asst. Equipment Manager), Mike Griebel (Massage Therapist), Bill Barber (Director-Player Personnel), Jake Goertzen (Head Scout)
- Phil Thibodeau (Director-Team Services), Ryan Belec (Asst. General Manager), Rick Paterson (Chief Pro Scout), Kari Kettunen (Scout)
- Glen Zacharias (Scout), Steve Barker (Scout), Dave Heitz (Scout)
- Yuri Yanchenkov (Scout), Bill Wickett (Sr. Vice President-Communications), Sean Henry (Exe. Vice President-Chief Operating Officer)

=== Engraving notes ===
- #9 Eric Perrin (C) played in 4 regular season games and 12 playoff games (4 in the Eastern Conference finals). #38 Darren Rumble (D) played in 5 regular season games and did not play in the playoffs (he was a healthy scratch). #2 Stanislav Neckar (D) played in 2 games in the Eastern Conference finals. Neckar was on the Nashville Predators injured reserve list for most of the season, before joining Tampa Bay in a trade on March 9, 2004. As they did not automatically qualify, Tampa Bay successfully requested an exemption to engrave their names.
- Ruslan Fedotenko was the first player who was born and raised in Ukraine, and exclusively trained in the country to win the Stanley Cup.
- All 52 members were included with their full first and last names on the presentation Stanley Cup, filling the last spot on it. When the engraver Louise St. Jacques went to engrave the replica Stanley Cup, there was less space available. There was more space between each winning team on the replica Stanley Cup than on the presentation Stanley Cup. Louise decided to keep each member's name in the same order on the same line on the replica Stanley Cup, so all names were engraved with their first initial and full last name. This is another way of telling the presentation Stanley Cup from the replica Stanley Cup. (see 1984 Stanley Cup Final and 1993 Stanley Cup Final)
- #24 Shane Willis (RW – 12 regular season games) and #40 Brian Eklund (G – 0 regular season games, 62 for Pensacola of the ECHL) did not play in or dress for the playoffs (both were healthy scratches). Both were on the roster during the Final, but left off the Stanley Cup engraving due to not qualifying. They were not in the team picture.

== Broadcasting ==
In the United States, this was the last Stanley Cup Final to air on ABC and the ESPN family of networks until the 2022 Finals. ESPN televised the first two games while ABC broadcast the rest of the series. Due to the 2004–05 NHL lockout, which suspended play for the next season, this marked the end of ESPN's third run and ABC's second run as the main NHL broadcasters. NBC and OLN would pick up the rights to broadcast the NHL for the 2005–06 season. The Comcast-owned OLN would later be renamed Versus for the 2006–07 season, then re-branded as NBCSN on January 2, 2012, following Comcast's 2011 acquisition of NBC, effectively moving to the NHL on NBC banner. The Finals would also be the last time a Canadian team played a game on ABC (regular season and postseason) until 2024.

In Canada, the CBC's broadcast of game seven of the Finals drew 4.862 million viewers, making it the highest-rated NHL game on the CBC since game seven of the 1994 Final, which drew 4.957 million viewers. However, those numbers include both pre-game and post-game coverage. The game itself drew 5.560 million viewers, up from 5.404 in 1994.

== Notes ==
| Preceded by New Jersey Devils; 2003 | Tampa Bay Lightning; 2004 Stanley Cup champions 2004 | Succeeded by Carolina Hurricanes; 2006 |
