= Dave Andreychuk =

Canadian ice hockey player (born 1963)

- Hockey Hall of Fame, 2017
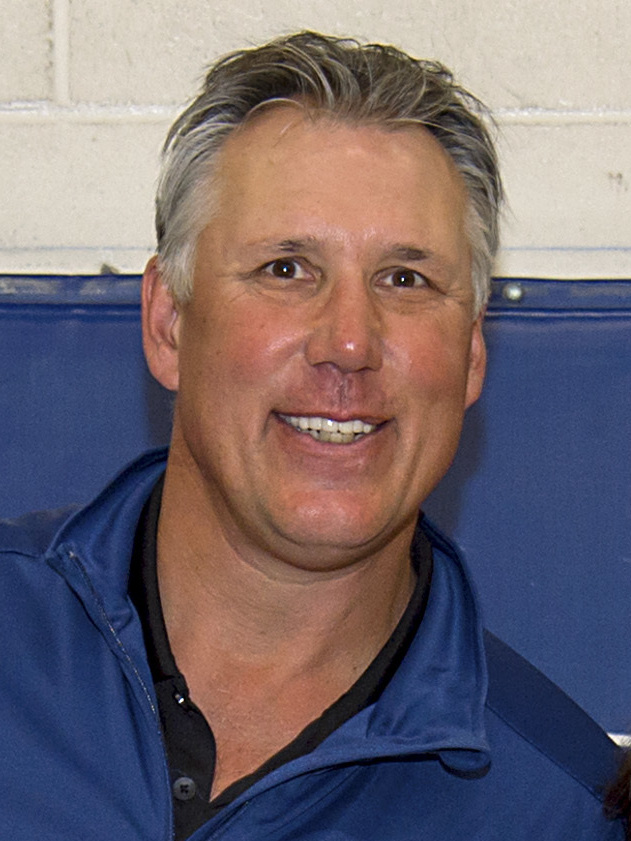
- Andreychuk in 2017
- Born: September 29, 1963 (age 63) Hamilton, Ontario, Canada
- Height: 6 ft 4 in (193 cm)
- Weight: 220 lb (100 kg; 15 st 10 lb)
- Position: Left wing
- Shot: Right
- Played for: Buffalo Sabres; Toronto Maple Leafs; New Jersey Devils; Boston Bruins; Colorado Avalanche; Tampa Bay Lightning
- National team: Canada
- NHL draft: 16th overall, 1982; Buffalo Sabres
- Playing career: 1982–2006
Medal record
Representing Canada
Ice hockey
World Championships
Bronze medal – third place	1986 Moscow
World Junior Championships
Bronze medal – third place	1983 Leningrad

David John Andreychuk (AN-dray-chuck; born September 29, 1963) is a Canadian former professional ice hockey forward who played in the NHL with the Buffalo Sabres, Toronto Maple Leafs, New Jersey Devils, Boston Bruins, Colorado Avalanche, and Tampa Bay Lightning.

Drafted in the first round by the Sabres in 1982, Andreychuk immediately made the major roster and recorded 14 goals in his first season. The following season saw him record the first of fourteen consecutive 20-goal seasons with 38. In the 1992–93 season, in the midst of recording his first 50-goal season, he was traded from the Sabres to the Maple Leafs, where he recorded a 50-goal season the following year. He was traded to the Devils midway in the 1995–96 season; the following year saw him become the 26th player to record 500 goals in NHL history. He played with three teams from 1999 to 2001 before signing with the Lightning as a free agent in 2001 that wanted him to provide veteran presence. Named captain in the 2002–03 season, he recorded his 600th goal. He recorded 14 points in the 2004 playoffs as the Lightning won the Stanley Cup Final to give Andreychuk his first championship; only Ray Bourque had played more games before winning a Stanley Cup in NHL history. He played his final season in the 2005–06 season and retired as one of only four players with 600 goals and 1,600 games played in NHL history.

One of the highest scoring left wingers in NHL history, Andreychuk recorded nineteen 20-goal seasons, a mark achieved by only five other players in NHL history. He retired as the career leader in power-play goals (274) before later being passed by Alexander Ovechkin. He was inducted into the Hockey Hall of Fame in 2017.

== Playing career ==
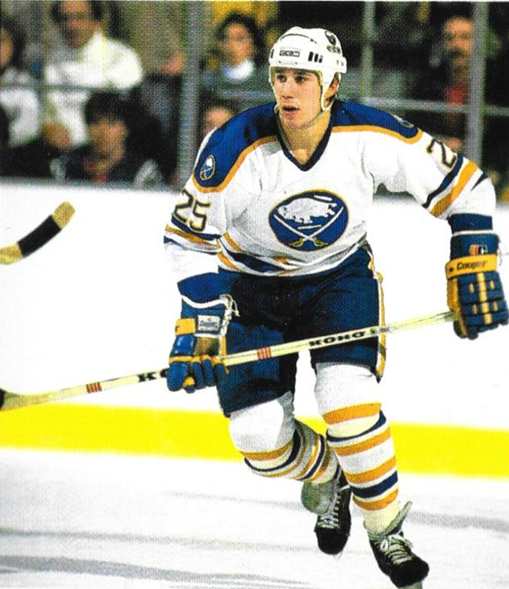
Andreychuk with the Buffalo Sabres in 1985

Dave Andreychuk was drafted by the Buffalo Sabres from the Ontario Hockey League's Oshawa Generals in the 1982 NHL entry draft and played his first NHL season in 1982–83. He had his only five-goal game as a professional on February 6, 1986, against the Boston Bruins. He went on to play eleven seasons in Buffalo before being traded on February 2, 1993, with Daren Puppa, and a 1993 first-round pick (Kenny Jönsson) to the Toronto Maple Leafs in exchange for Grant Fuhr and a conditional 1995 fifth-round draft pick. He played for the Leafs until the 1995–96 season when he was traded to the New Jersey Devils, where he stayed until 1999. After New Jersey, he had short stints with the Boston Bruins (1999–2000), Colorado Avalanche (2000), and Buffalo Sabres (2000–01), before settling with the Tampa Bay Lightning (2001–02 to 2005–06).

His best season offensively was in 1993–94 when, with Toronto, he posted 53 goals and 99 points. The 1993 and 1994 playoffs also saw Andreychuk and the Maple Leafs advance to the Conference Finals, where they lost to the Los Angeles Kings and the Vancouver Canucks, respectively. As a result of his successful stint with the team, many Maple Leafs' fans still affectionately refer to him simply as "Uncle Dave". Andreychuk referred to the famed 1993 run in particular as particularly heartbreaking, as Toronto was eliminated in game seven negating the chance of a Toronto–Montreal Stanley Cup Final in the season that marked the 100th anniversary of the Stanley Cup.

As a member of the Boston Bruins on October 28, 1999, Andreychuk had his fourth and last four-goal game as a player, doing so at home versus the Tampa Bay Lightning.

Prior to the start of the 2001–02 NHL season, Andreychuk was considering retirement. However, Rick Dudley, GM of the Lightning and a former coach of Andreychuk, thought he could provide a key veteran presence to the team, which had recently seen John Tortorella strip Vincent Lecavalier of the captaincy. He laid down a few rules for the team to tighten the team up, ranging from not dumping jerseys on the floor and instead putting them in the laundry bin to implementing a $5 fine for anyone who laid a foot over the team logo on the floor (with proceeds going to charity). The team again missed the playoffs that season, but Andreychuk refused trades to contenders, stating his work with the team was not finished. In the 2002–03 season, Tortorella appointed Andreychuk the captain, which was the first time he had been captain of a team. Andreychuk promptly led the Lightning to the playoffs for the first time in seven seasons.

In the 2003–04 NHL season, Andreychuk continued as a key contributor for the Lightning offence, reaching 20 goals for the third consecutive year with the team. Qualifying for the playoffs for a second consecutive year, Andreychuk helped the Lightning defeat the Calgary Flames in seven games to win the Stanley Cup for the first time in franchise history. Andreychuk went 22 years without being on a Stanley Cup championship team, tying the NHL record with Ray Bourque for the longest career before doing so (Andreychuk had played 1597 regular-season games to that point, and only Bourque had played more career games before being on his first Stanley Cup-winning team).

Following the 2004–05 NHL lockout, Andreychuk returned to the Lightning for the 2005–06 season. After the year off, Andreychuk's contributions decreased and on January 10, 2006, he was waived by the Lightning, bringing an end to his career. Noted for his pride in playing 1,639 games in the NHL, he is one of only four players with 600 goals and 1,600 games played.

== Post-retirement ==
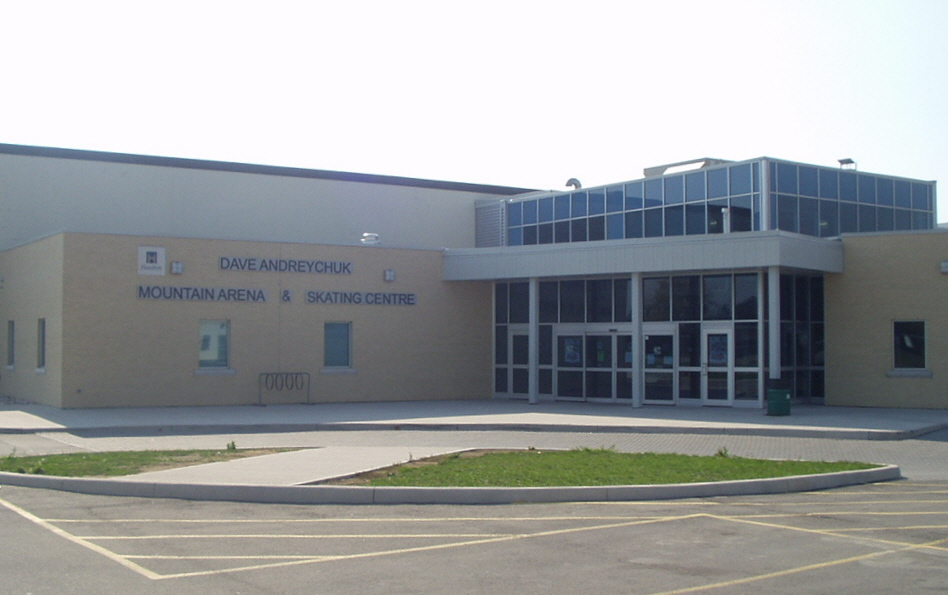
Dave Andreychuk Mountain Arena

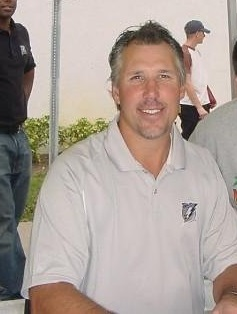
Andreychuk pictured in 2008 during a car show

On October 1, 2006, Andreychuk rejoined the Lightning as a Community Representative.

In 2005, the city of Hamilton renamed the Mountain Arena, following renovations, the Dave Andreychuk Mountain Arena & Skating Centre in his honour. On November 28, 2008, he was inducted into the Buffalo Sabres Hall of Fame.

On February 4, 2011, the Tampa Bay Lightning named Andreychuk as their vice president in charge of fans. He currently serves as the Lightning's Vice President of Corporate & Community Affairs.

== Personal life ==
Andreychuk has three daughters with Susan Braunscheidel, whom he divorced in 2019 after 28 years of marriage. Prior to his appointment in the Lightning's front office, Andreychuk and his family resided in East Amherst, New York.

Following his retirement from professional sport, Andreychuk also founded the Dave Andreychuk Foundation as a way of giving back to the community. The foundation has branches in Hamilton, Ontario, and Tampa, Florida. The goals of the foundation are three-fold: 1. Assist children in need, 2. Support causes for children and families enduring chronic and/or life-threatening illness, and 3. Encourage the investment of youth and amateur sports. The foundation formally closed in 2025 due to a decline in donations, as younger athletes entered the spotlight in and around his hometown of Hamilton.

== Records and achievements ==
- Tenth most games played in NHL history with 1639.
- 15th most goals scored in NHL history with 640.
- Tied with Denis Savard for 28th in league history with 1,338 points.
- Second most NHL career power-play goals with 274.
- 1991–92 NHL power-play goals leader with 28.
- 1992–93 NHL power-play goals leader with 32.
- Played in NHL All-Star Game in 1990 and 1994.
- Stanley Cup champion (2004)
- Inducted into the Hockey Hall of Fame in 2017.
- In 2014 the Lightning revealed a statue outside Amalie Arena depicting him lifting the Stanley Cup after winning it in 2004.
- Inducted into the Tampa Bay Lightning Hall of Fame as part of its second class in 2024.

== Career statistics ==
=== Regular season and playoffs ===
			Regular season					Playoffs
Season	Team	League	GP	G	A	Pts	PIM	GP	G	A	Pts	PIM
1979–80	Hamilton	OMHA	21	25	24	49	—	—	—	—	—	—
1980–81	Oshawa Generals	OHL	67	22	22	44	80	10	3	2	5	20
1981–82	Oshawa Generals	OHL	67	57	43	100	71	3	1	4	5	16
1982–83	Oshawa Generals	OHL	14	8	24	32	6	—	—	—	—	—
1982–83	Buffalo Sabres	NHL	43	14	23	37	16	4	1	0	1	4
1983–84	Buffalo Sabres	NHL	78	38	42	80	42	2	0	1	1	2
1984–85	Buffalo Sabres	NHL	64	31	30	61	54	5	4	2	6	4
1985–86	Buffalo Sabres	NHL	80	36	51	87	61	—	—	—	—	—
1986–87	Buffalo Sabres	NHL	77	25	48	73	46	—	—	—	—	—
1987–88	Buffalo Sabres	NHL	80	30	48	78	112	6	2	4	6	0
1988–89	Buffalo Sabres	NHL	56	28	24	52	40	5	0	3	3	0
1989–90	Buffalo Sabres	NHL	73	40	42	82	42	6	2	5	7	2
1990–91	Buffalo Sabres	NHL	80	36	33	69	32	6	2	2	4	8
1991–92	Buffalo Sabres	NHL	80	41	50	91	71	7	1	3	4	12
1992–93	Buffalo Sabres	NHL	52	29	32	61	48	—	—	—	—	—
1992–93	Toronto Maple Leafs	NHL	31	25	13	38	8	21	12	7	19	35
1993–94	Toronto Maple Leafs	NHL	83	53	46	99	98	18	5	5	10	16
1994–95	Toronto Maple Leafs	NHL	48	22	16	38	34	7	3	2	5	25
1995–96	Toronto Maple Leafs	NHL	61	20	24	44	54	—	—	—	—	—
1995–96	New Jersey Devils	NHL	15	8	5	13	10	—	—	—	—	—
1996–97	New Jersey Devils	NHL	82	27	34	61	48	1	0	0	0	0
1997–98	New Jersey Devils	NHL	75	14	34	48	26	6	1	0	1	4
1998–99	New Jersey Devils	NHL	52	15	13	28	20	4	2	0	2	4
1999–00	Boston Bruins	NHL	63	19	14	33	28	—	—	—	—	—
1999–00	Colorado Avalanche	NHL	14	1	2	3	2	17	3	2	5	18
2000–01	Buffalo Sabres	NHL	74	20	13	33	32	13	1	2	3	4
2001–02	Tampa Bay Lightning	NHL	82	21	17	38	109	—	—	—	—	—
2002–03	Tampa Bay Lightning	NHL	72	20	14	34	34	11	3	3	6	10
2003–04	Tampa Bay Lightning	NHL	82	21	18	39	42	23	1	13	14	14
2005–06	Tampa Bay Lightning	NHL	42	6	12	18	16	—	—	—	—	—
NHL totals			1,639	640	698	1,338	1,125	162	43	54	97	162

=== International ===
Year	Team	Event	Result	GP	G	A	Pts	PIM
1983	Canada	WJC	3rd place, bronze medalist(s)	7	6	5	11	14
1986	Canada	WC	3rd place, bronze medalist(s)	10	3	2	5	18
Junior totals				7	6	5	11	14
Senior totals				10	3	2	5	18

== See also ==
- List of NHL statistical leaders
- List of NHL players with 1,000 points
- List of NHL players with 500 goals
- List of NHL players with 1,000 games played

Awards and achievements
Preceded by Paul Cyr	Buffalo Sabres first-round draft pick 1982	Succeeded by Tom Barrasso
Preceded by Vincent Lecavalier	Tampa Bay Lightning captain 2002–06	Succeeded by Tim Taylor
