= Dan Boyle (ice hockey) =

Canadian ice hockey player (born 1976)

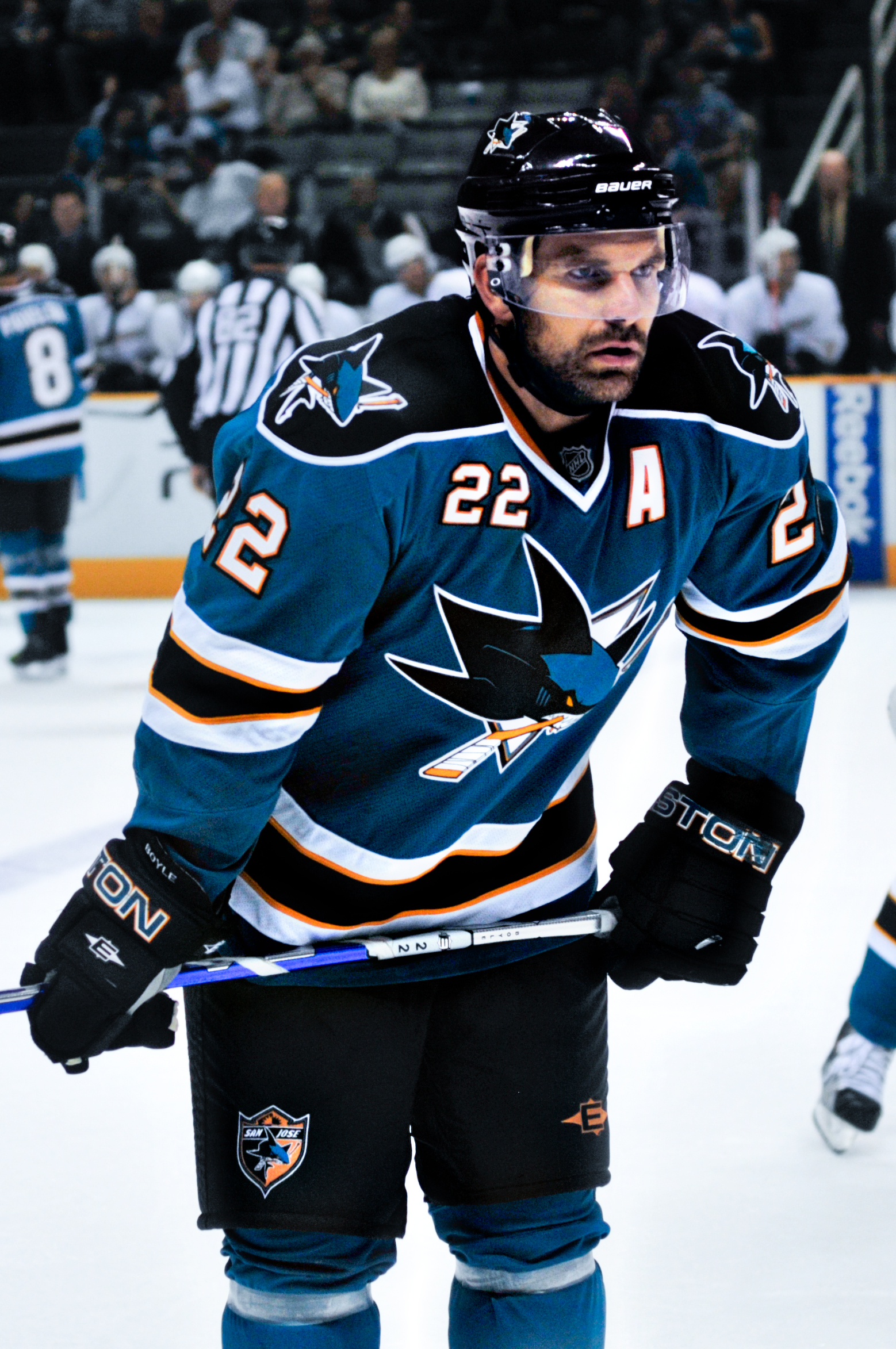
- Boyle with the San Jose Sharks in 2009
- Born: July 12, 1976 (age 50) Ottawa, Ontario, Canada
- Height: 5 ft 11 in (180 cm)
- Weight: 190 lb (86 kg; 13 st 8 lb)
- Position: Defenceman
- Shot: Right
- Played for: Florida Panthers; Tampa Bay Lightning; Djurgårdens IF; San Jose Sharks; New York Rangers
- National team: Canada
- NHL draft: Undrafted
- Playing career: 1998–2016

Daniel Denis Boyle (born July 12, 1976) is a Canadian former professional ice hockey defenceman who played in the National Hockey League (NHL). Undrafted, Boyle played in the NHL for the Florida Panthers; Tampa Bay Lightning, with which he won the Stanley Cup in 2004; San Jose Sharks; and New York Rangers.

== Collegiate career ==
Boyle played junior hockey for the Gloucester Rangers of the Canadian Junior Hockey League and signed to play US college hockey for Miami University of the CCHA. Boyle established himself quickly, making the first-team All-Rookie team in 1994–95, the All-CCHA First Team in 1996–97 and 1997–98, and being named a first-team All-American in both 1997 and 1998. He was Miami's record holder for goals in a game by a defenseman (3) and points in a season by a defenseman (54). During his career, he ranked second at Miami in career assists (107), ninth in career points (147) and third in assists in a season (43 in 1997). In 1996–97, Boyle helped Miami to a 27–12–1 (.688) mark and the program's second ever appearance in the NCAA Tournament. Boyle was named to the Miami University Athletic Hall of Fame in 2007.

== Professional career ==
=== Florida Panthers ===
Undrafted in any NHL entry draft after four years of college hockey at Miami University, the under-sized defender was signed as a free agent by the Florida Panthers on March 30, 1998. Boyle was signed by Florida after being scouted by Bill Davich, a golf instructor for Miami University and part time scout for the Panthers saw him play; the Panthers were the only team to have interest in Boyle. He played the majority of his first two seasons in the Panthers' farm system in the American Hockey League (AHL), earning All-Rookie Team honours in 1999, as well as Second Team All-Star honours in 1999 and 2000. Boyle earned a full-time roster spot with the Panthers in 2000–01, recording four goals and 22 points. Boyle had a rocky relationship with the team throughout his tenure with the Panthers, particularly after Florida hired hardnosed coach Mike Keenan in 2001, under whom he was often a healthy scratch.

=== Tampa Bay Lightning ===
During the next season (his fourth in Florida), Boyle had fallen out of favour with coach Keenan and was traded to the Tampa Bay Lightning in exchange for a 2003 fifth-round draft pick (Martin Tůma) on January 7, 2002. After completing the season with 20 points in 41 games after coming over from the Panthers, he was re-signed to a one-year contract by the Lightning on August 6, 2002.

Boyle recorded 13 goals and 53 points in his first full season with the Lightning in 2002–03 before helping the team to the 2004 Stanley Cup championship. Due to the 2004–05 NHL lockout, Boyle went overseas to play for Djurgårdens IF of the Swedish Elitserien. As NHL play resumed the next season, Boyle continued to produce with a 15-goal, 53-point season in 2005–06. He recorded his first career NHL hat-trick against the New York Rangers on December 23, 2006, adding an assist for a four-point game in a 4–3 win. The following season, Boyle elevated his game to career-high numbers of 20 goals, 43 assists and 63 points, good enough for Second team All-Star honours.

Boyle suffered a major setback, however, in September 2007, injuring himself in a freak accident after a pre-season game when a skate slipped off a hook in his locker and hit him in the left wrist, severing three tendons. Boyle underwent initial wrist surgery on September 23; he attempted to return on October 29, but after playing his first four games of the 2007–08 season, Boyle underwent additional surgery on the injured wrist, missing another 36 games. He did not make a full comeback until January 24, 2008, scoring two goals in his return, and soon thereafter was re-signed to a six-year, $40 million contract extension on February 25. He completed his injury-shortened campaign with 25 points in 37 games.

Despite having signed a six-year extension with the Lightning in February, Tampa Bay looked to trade Boyle soon after and threatened to put him on waivers, allowing any franchise to select Boyle for zero compensation to the team, if he did not waive his no-trade clause to accept a trade out of Tampa. The Atlanta Thrashers were the team with the top priority on the waiver wire and not wanting to be a member of the Thrashers, Boyle worked with the team to orchestrate a trade to one of his three top preferred destinations: the San Jose Sharks, the Philadelphia Flyers, and the Montreal Canadiens.

=== San Jose Sharks ===
On July 4, 2008, Boyle was traded, along with Brad Lukowich, to the San Jose Sharks in exchange for Matt Carle, Ty Wishart, a first-round draft pick in 2009 and a fourth-round draft pick in 2010. Boyle was pressured to waive his no-trade clause by Tampa Bay's new ownership, who said they would otherwise place him on waivers, where he would likely be claimed by the Atlanta Thrashers. Already knowing Joe Thornton, Patrick Marleau and Evgeni Nabokov, Boyle agreed to be traded to the Sharks.

In his first season with the Sharks, Boyle tallied 16 goals and 57 points over 77 games, leading all team defencemen. The following season, on December 31, 2009, Boyle scored his 100th career NHL goal against the Phoenix Coyotes in a 3–2 shootout win. He finished the campaign with 15 goals and 58 points. In the opening series of the 2010 playoffs, Boyle ended game three against the Colorado Avalanche in overtime by inadvertently shooting the puck into his own net. Pressured by Avalanche forward Ryan O'Reilly, Boyle attempted to ring the puck around the boards behind his net, but it was deflected by O'Reilly into the Sharks' net between Evgeni Nabokov's pad and the post, resulting in a 1–0 win for Colorado and 2–1 series lead. Nonetheless, the Sharks won the series 4–2, winning games 4, 5 and 6; Boyle had a point in all three games.

In the first period of the October 15, 2013, against the St. Louis Blues, Boyle was checked from behind by Maxim Lapierre into the boards, injuring his jaw and knocking him unconscious; the incident led to a fight involving teammate Matt Pelech and 17 minutes worth of penalties for Andrew Desjardins. Boyle was taken off the ice via stretcher to a local hospital, and would miss the following game against the Dallas Stars. He returned on November 2, in a game against the Phoenix Coyotes, scoring a goal in a shootout loss. After the conclusion of the 2013–14 season, Sharks general manager Doug Wilson announced that pending free agent Boyle would not be returning to San Jose for the 2014–15 season. On June 5, the Sharks traded his rights to the New York Islanders for a conditional 2015 fifth-round pick.

=== New York Rangers ===
Unable to come to terms with the Islanders, Boyle opted to head to free agency, and on July 1, 2014, he signed a two-year contract with the New York Rangers. Boyle's time with the Rangers is often remembered by a notable verbal altercation he had with Rangers reporter Larry Brooks when Boyle refused to conduct an interview with Brooks in the locker room on April 26, 2016.

Unsigned for the entire 2016 offseason, on October 5, 2016, Boyle announced his retirement from the NHL. Boyle scored 164 goals and 605 points over 1,093 NHL games with four teams. In his retirement statement Boyle said, "I've been fortunate and blessed to have had the opportunity to do what I most love to do. All I wanted to do as a young boy was have the opportunity to play ONE game in the NHL. Over a thousand games later, this whole experience seems surreal. I want to thank all four organizations for the opportunity, my teammates and the FANS for this amazing run that I will cherish forever." Boyle stated that he will live in the San Jose area with his family.

== International play ==
Medal record

Ice hockey

Representing Canada

Olympic Games
Gold medal – first place	2010 Vancouver	

World Championships
Silver medal – second place	2005 Austria	

Boyle made his international debut with Canada at the 2005 World Championships in Austria during the 2004–05 NHL lockout. He contributed three assists in nine games as part of a silver medal-winning effort by Canada; they were defeated 3–0 in the gold medal game by the Czech Republic. The next year, Boyle was named as a reserve in light of injuries to Scott Niedermayer and Ed Jovanovski for Team Canada at the 2006 Winter Olympics in Turin. He did not appear in a game, however, as Team Canada was kept off the podium.

On December 30, 2009, team Canada general manager Steve Yzerman named Boyle to the 2010 Winter Olympic team as a full member. On February 28, 2010, the team defeated the United States to win Canada's eighth gold medal in Olympic men's hockey.

== Personal life ==
Boyle has two daughters. and is in a relationship with real estate agent Collette D’Amico.

Growing up, Boyle attended French-speaking École élémentaire Sainte-Anne and École secondaire publique De La Salle in Ottawa. As a child he was a fan of the Philadelphia Flyers, though his family cheered for the Montreal Canadiens.

During Game 1 of the 2004 Stanley Cup Finals with the Tampa Bay Lightning against the Calgary Flames, an electrical fire broke out in his Florida home, causing an estimated $300,000 worth of damage.

== Career statistics ==
=== Regular season and playoffs ===
			Regular season					Playoffs
Season	Team	League	GP	G	A	Pts	PIM	GP	G	A	Pts	PIM
1991–92	Gloucester Rangers	CJHL	4	0	1	1	0	—	—	—	—	—
1992–93	Gloucester Rangers	CJHL	55	22	51	73	60	—	—	—	—	—
1993–94	Gloucester Rangers	CJHL	53	27	44	81	155	—	—	—	—	—
1994–95	Miami University (Ohio)	CCHA	35	8	18	26	24	—	—	—	—	—
1995–96	Miami University (Ohio)	CCHA	36	7	20	27	70	—	—	—	—	—
1996–97	Miami University (Ohio)	CCHA	40	11	43	54	52	—	—	—	—	—
1997–98	Miami University (Ohio)	CCHA	37	14	26	40	58	—	—	—	—	—
1997–98	Cincinnati Cyclones	IHL	8	0	3	3	20	5	0	1	1	4
1998–99	Kentucky Thoroughblades	AHL	53	8	34	42	87	12	3	5	8	16
1998–99	Florida Panthers	NHL	22	3	5	8	6	—	—	—	—	—
1999–2000	Louisville Panthers	AHL	58	14	38	52	75	4	0	2	2	8
1999–2000	Florida Panthers	NHL	13	0	3	3	4	—	—	—	—	—
2000–01	Louisville Panthers	AHL	6	0	5	5	12	—	—	—	—	—
2000–01	Florida Panthers	NHL	69	4	18	22	28	—	—	—	—	—
2001–02	Florida Panthers	NHL	25	3	3	6	12	—	—	—	—	—
2001–02	Tampa Bay Lightning	NHL	41	5	15	20	27	—	—	—	—	—
2002–03	Tampa Bay Lightning	NHL	77	13	40	53	44	11	0	7	7	6
2003–04	Tampa Bay Lightning	NHL	78	9	30	39	60	23	2	8	10	16
2004–05	Djurgårdens IF	SEL	32	9	9	18	47	12	2	3	5	26
2005–06	Tampa Bay Lightning	NHL	79	15	38	53	38	5	1	3	4	6
2006–07	Tampa Bay Lightning	NHL	82	20	43	63	62	6	0	1	1	2
2007–08	Tampa Bay Lightning	NHL	37	4	21	25	57	—	—	—	—	—
2008–09	San Jose Sharks	NHL	77	16	41	57	52	6	2	2	4	8
2009–10	San Jose Sharks	NHL	76	15	43	58	70	15	2	12	14	8
2010–11	San Jose Sharks	NHL	76	9	41	50	67	18	4	12	16	8
2011–12	San Jose Sharks	NHL	81	9	39	48	57	5	0	2	2	4
2012–13	San Jose Sharks	NHL	46	7	13	20	27	11	3	5	8	2
2013–14	San Jose Sharks	NHL	75	12	24	36	32	7	0	4	4	8
2014–15	New York Rangers	NHL	65	9	11	20	20	19	3	7	10	2
2015–16	New York Rangers	NHL	74	10	14	24	30	4	0	1	1	0
NHL totals			1,093	163	442	605	693	130	17	64	81	70

=== International ===
Year	Team	Event	Result	GP	G	A	Pts	PIM
2005	Canada	WC	2nd place, silver medalist(s)	9	0	3	3	6
2010	Canada	Oly	1st place, gold medalist(s)	7	1	5	6	2
Senior totals				16	1	8	9	8

== Awards and honours ==
Award	Year
All-CCHA Rookie Team	1994–95
All-CCHA First Team	1996–97, 1997–98
AHCA West first-team All-American	1996–97, 1997–98
AHL All-Rookie Team	1998–99
AHL second All-Star team	1998–99, 1999–00
NHL Stanley Cup	2003–04
NHL second All-Star team	2006–07, 2008–09

== See also ==
- List of NHL players with 1,000 games played

Awards and achievements
Preceded by Andy Roach	CCHA Best Offensive Defenseman; 1997–98	Succeeded by Mike Jones
