= Oleg Saprykin =

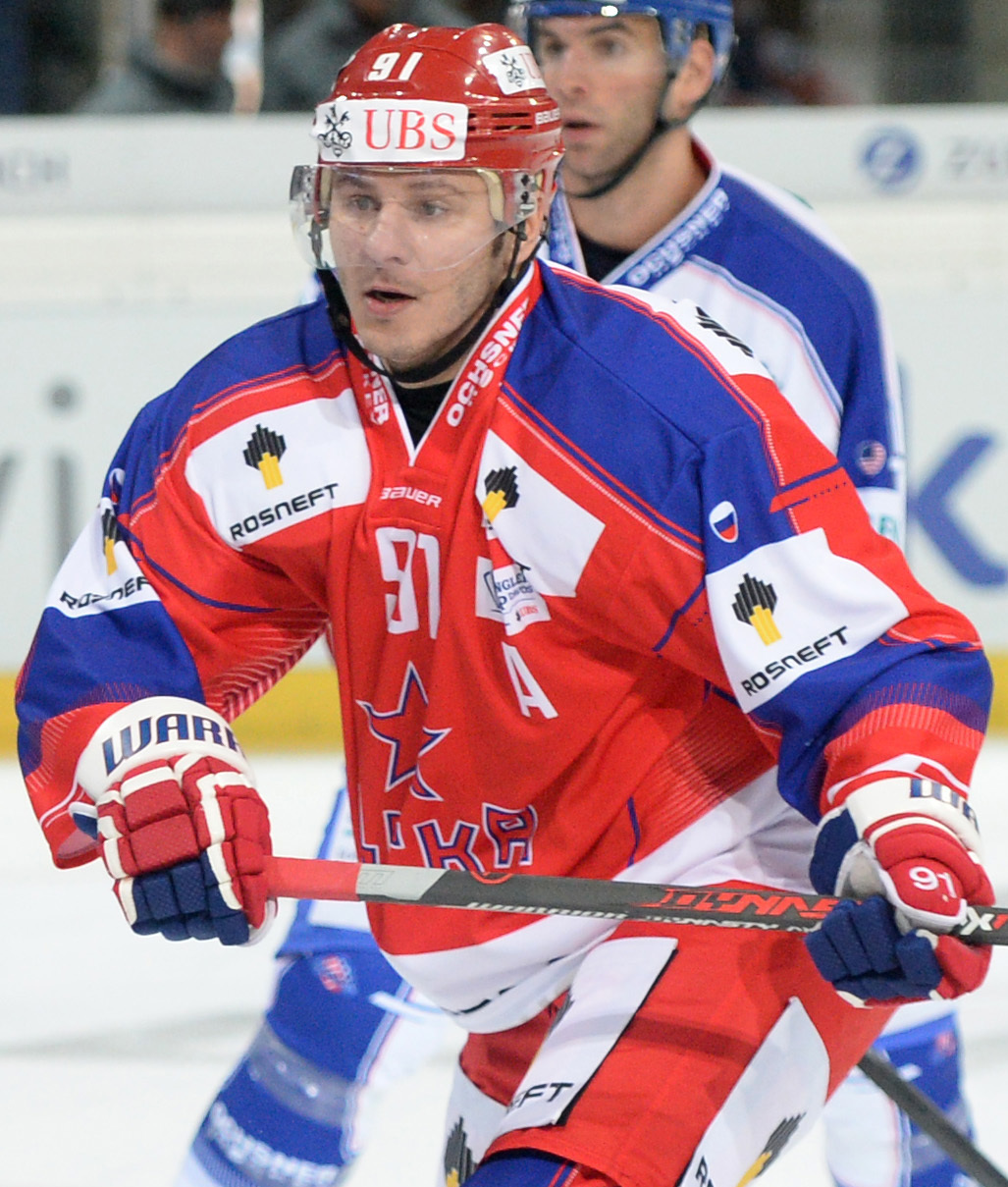
- Saprykin with CSKA Moscow in 2013
- Born: February 12, 1981 (age 45) Moscow, Russian SFSR, URS
- Height: 6 ft 1 in (185 cm)
- Weight: 190 lb (86 kg; 13 st 8 lb)
- Position: Left wing
- Shot: Left
- Played for: Calgary Flames; Phoenix Coyotes; Ottawa Senators; HC Dynamo Moscow; SKA Saint Petersburg; Salavat Yulaev Ufa; CSKA Moscow; HC Sochi; Avtomobilist Yekaterinburg; Salavat Yulaev Ufa
- National team: Russia
- NHL draft: 11th overall, 1999; Calgary Flames
- Playing career: 2000–2016

Oleg Dmitrievich Saprykin (Russian: Олег Дмитриевич Сапрыкин; born February 12, 1981) is a Russian former professional ice hockey player. Saprykin played with HC Dynamo Moscow, SKA Saint Petersburg, HC Sochi and Avtomobilist Yekaterinburg. He played in the 2009 KHL All-Star Game, held in Red Square and was a member of Ufa's Gagarin Cup championship team in 2011. Saprykin also played parts of seven seasons in the National Hockey League (NHL). He was a first round selection, 11th overall, of the Calgary Flames and also played for the Phoenix Coyotes and Ottawa Senators. Internationally, Saprykin has played with the Russian National Team on two occasions and was a member of the team that won the gold medal at the 2009 World Championship.

== Playing career ==
As a youth, Saprykin played in the 1995 Quebec International Pee-Wee Hockey Tournament with a combined team from Yaroslavl and Kharkiv.

A native of Moscow, Saprykin broke into the Russian Super League in 1997 as a 16-year-old with HC CSKA Moscow. He recorded two assists in 20 Russian League games. Hoping to attract the attention of National Hockey League (NHL) scouts, Saprykin left Russia to play junior hockey in North America. He joined the Seattle Thunderbirds in the Western Hockey League (WHL) for the 1998–99 season. Saprykin finished 10th in league scoring with 93 points and was named to the WHL's second All-Star Team.

=== National Hockey League ===
The Calgary Flames selected Saprykin with their first round selection, 11th overall, at the 1999 NHL entry draft. He earned a spot on the Flames to start the 1999–2000 season and made his NHL debut and scored his first point (an assist) on October 2, 1999, against the San Jose Sharks. It was his lone point in four games before the Flames reassigned him back to Seattle. Saprykin appeared in only 48 games with the Thunderbirds but scored 66 points. He was named to the second All-Star Team for the second season in a row.

Saprykin spent the 2000–01 season with the Flames. He scored his first NHL goal on October 24, 2000, against goaltender Sean Burke of the Phoenix Coyotes. He finished the year with nine goals and 23 points in 59 games. The Flames assigned Saprykin to their American Hockey League (AHL) affiliate, the Saint John Flames for the majority of the 2001–02 season; He played only three games in Calgary but had 24 points in 52 AHL games. He was again assigned to Saint John to begin the 2002–03 season but put his career in jeopardy by failing to report to the team. The Flames suspended Saprykin, but he rejoined his team four days later, and by the start of December had been recalled to Calgary. He finished the season with 21 points in 21 games with Saint John, and 23 points in 52 games in Calgary. Saprykin then made his debut with the Russian National Team; He scored one goal and three assists in seven games for the seventh place Russians at the 2003 World Championship.

Saprykin spent the entire 2003–04 season in Calgary and recorded 29 points in 69 games. He then played with the team in the 2004 Stanley Cup Playoffs as the Flames, who had missed the post-season the previous seven seasons, went on a Cinderella run to the Stanley Cup Finals. Saprykin recorded six points in 26 games during the run; of his three goals, none was larger than his overtime winning goal in game five of the final, against the Tampa Bay Lightning. Standing in front of the net, Saprykin collected the puck on a rebound following a Jarome Iginla shot and scored to bring the Flames within one win of capturing the Stanley Cup. The Flames were unable to win the title, as they lost both the sixth and deciding seventh games of the series.

On August 26, 2004, the Flames traded Saprykin, along with Denis Gauthier to the Phoenix Coyotes in exchange for Daymond Langkow. It would be a full year before he joined his new team as the entire 2004–05 NHL season was wiped out by a labour dispute. Saprykin spent the season with CSKA Moscow. Returning to the NHL in 2005–06, Saprykin recorded 25 points in 67 games for the Coyotes. He then had his best NHL season in 2006–07 as he scored 34 points in 59 games with Phoenix. Late in the campaign, on February 27, 2007, the Coyotes traded him, along with a seventh round draft pick to the Ottawa Senators for a second round selection in 2008. In acquiring Saprykin, the Senators praised his work ethic and hoped he would add energy to the team's lineup. He played 12 regular season games with Ottawa and 15 in the 2007 Stanley Cup Playoffs, and recorded a goal and an assist in each. The Senators reached the 2007 Stanley Cup Finals, but lost the series in five games to the Anaheim Ducks.

=== Kontinental Hockey League ===
Saprykin left the NHL following the season. He opted to return to Russia and signed a contract with CSKA Moscow for the 2007–08 season where he recorded professional career highs of 29 goals and 49 points. In his second year with CSKA, Saprykin was named a Kontinental Hockey League (KHL) All-Star and scored two goals in the contest held outdoors in Moscow's Red Square.

Saprykin returned to the national team and scored four goals and three assists in nine games at the 2009 World Championship. He scored a goal in the gold medal game, a 2–1 victory over Canada, as the Russians won the world title. In the KHL, Saprykin passed through several clubs. He played with Dynamo Moscow and SKA Saint Petersburg in 2009–10 then spent three seasons with Salavat Yulaev Ufa. In Saprykin's first season with Ufa, 2010–11, the team won the Gagarin Cup as KHL champions after defeating Atlant Mytishi four games to one in the final. Saprykin again returned to CSKA Moscow in 2013–14 by signing a one-year contract with the club. Saprykin left CSKA Moscow after the season to sign with HC Sochi which is set to start playing in the 2014–15 season. He was named the first captain for Sochi.

Saprykin scored 3 goals in 15 games, before suffering an injury. Upon recovery he was mutually released from his contract with Sochi on November 18, 2014.

On December 24, 2015, signed a contract with Salavat Yulaev Ufa till the end of the season.

== Personal life ==
Saprykin lives in Moscow and maintains a second residence in Phoenix, Arizona. He is a dual citizen; Saprykin earned Canadian citizenship in 2005.

On January 1, 2019, Saprykin was arrested after he attacked a female flight attendant on an Aurora Airlines flight from Sochi to Moscow, forcing the plane to be diverted. Saprykin, who was visibly intoxicated according to witnesses, demanded that the flight attendant top-up his glass of whiskey but was refused. Saprykin reportedly "began to scream and use foul language" and struck the female flight attendant on the head with such force that she was knocked to the floor. The captain diverted the flight to Voronezh, where Saprykin was forcibly removed from the aircraft and detained by airport authorities as the plane continued on its way to Moscow.

== Career statistics ==
=== Regular season and playoffs ===
			Regular season					Playoffs
Season	Team	League	GP	G	A	Pts	PIM	GP	G	A	Pts	PIM
1997–98	CSKA Moscow	RSL	20	0	2	2	8	—	—	—	—	—
1998–99	Seattle Thunderbirds	WHL	66	47	46	93	107	11	5	11	16	36
1999–2000	Seattle Thunderbirds	WHL	48	30	36	66	107	6	3	3	6	37
1999–2000	Calgary Flames	NHL	4	0	1	1	2	—	—	—	—	—
2000–01	Calgary Flames	NHL	59	9	14	23	43	—	—	—	—	—
2001–02	Calgary Flames	NHL	3	0	0	0	0	—	—	—	—	—
2001–02	Saint John Flames	AHL	52	5	19	24	53	—	—	—	—	—
2002–03	Calgary Flames	NHL	52	8	15	23	46	—	—	—	—	—
2002–03	Saint John Flames	AHL	21	12	9	21	22	—	—	—	—	—
2003–04	Calgary Flames	NHL	69	12	17	29	41	26	3	3	6	4
2004–05	CSKA Moscow	RSL	40	15	8	23	105	—	—	—	—	—
2005–06	Phoenix Coyotes	NHL	67	11	14	25	50	—	—	—	—	—
2006–07	Phoenix Coyotes	NHL	59	14	20	34	54	—	—	—	—	—
2006–07	Ottawa Senators	NHL	12	1	1	2	4	15	1	1	2	4
2007–08	CSKA Moscow	RSL	57	29	20	49	119	6	1	1	2	24
2008–09	CSKA Moscow	KHL	51	18	23	41	89	8	1	1	2	4
2009–10	Dynamo Moscow	KHL	24	5	2	7	26	—	—	—	—	—
2009–10	SKA St. Petersburg	KHL	23	2	4	6	22	4	0	0	0	2
2010–11	Salavat Yulaev Ufa	KHL	44	5	4	9	42	21	3	2	5	14
2011–12	Salavat Yulaev Ufa	KHL	50	17	22	39	54	4	1	1	2	0
2012–13	Salavat Yulaev Ufa	KHL	32	5	7	12	16	1	0	0	0	0
2013–14	CSKA Moscow	KHL	52	10	8	18	42	4	0	0	0	6
2014–15	HC Sochi	KHL	15	3	0	3	12	—	—	—	—	—
2015–16	Avtomobilist Yekaterinburg	KHL	18	5	1	6	12	—	—	—	—	—
2015–16	Salavat Yulaev Ufa	KHL	15	1	0	1	10	10	1	0	1	35
NHL totals			325	55	82	137	240	41	4	4	8	18
KHL totals			324	70	67	137	325	52	6	4	10	61

=== International ===
Year	Team	Event	Result	GP	G	A	Pts	PIM
2003	Russia	WC	7th	7	1	3	4	6
2009	Russia	WC	1st place, gold medalist(s)	9	4	3	7	0
Senior totals				16	5	6	11	6

== Awards and honours ==
Medal record

Representing Russia

Men's ice hockey

World Championship
Gold medal – first place	2009 Switzerland	

Award	Year
Junior
WHL West Second All-Star Team	1998–99; 1999–00

Awards and achievements
Preceded by Rico Fata	Calgary Flames' first-round draft pick 1999	Succeeded by Brent Krahn
