= André Roy =

American-born Canadian ice hockey player

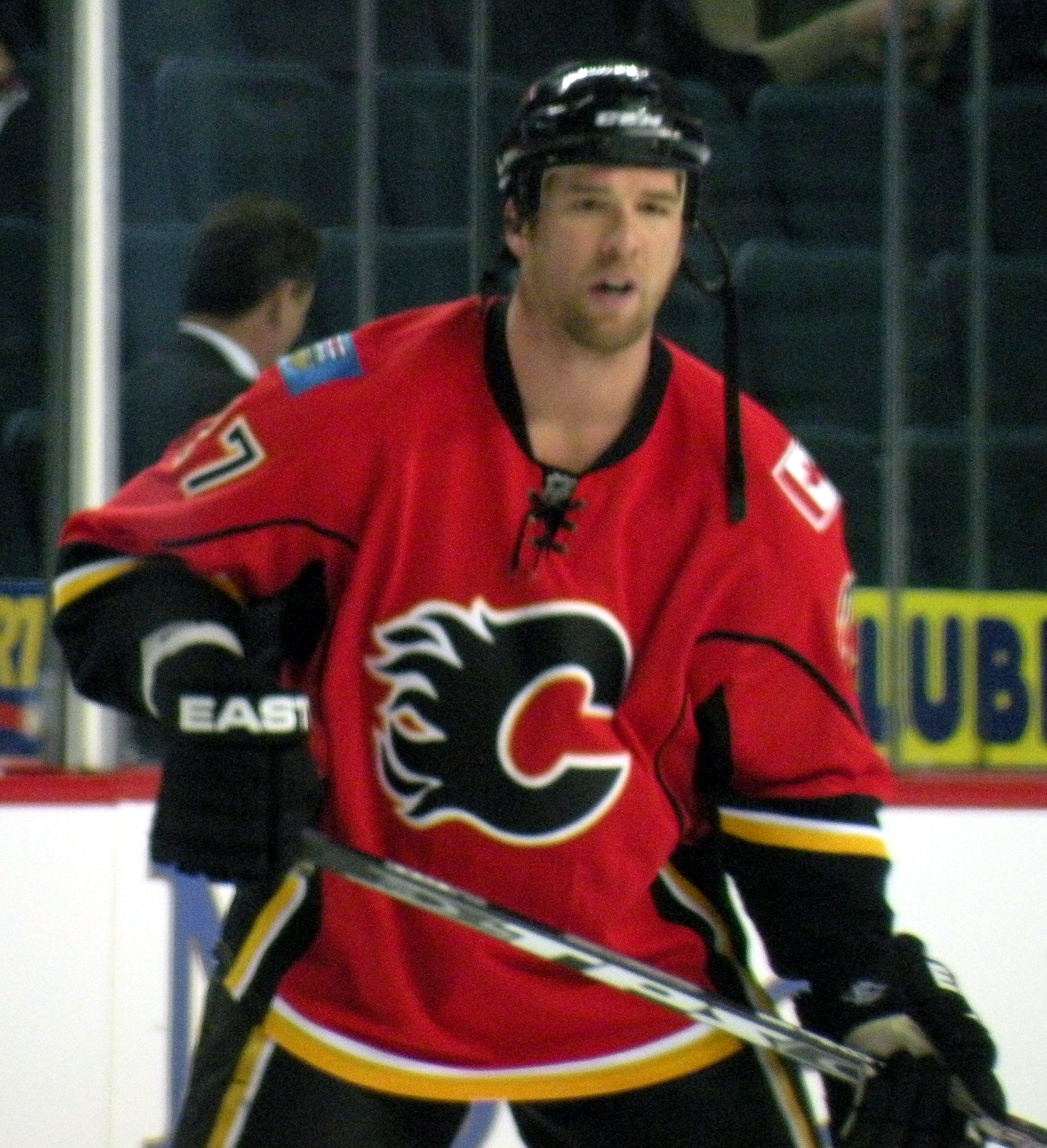
- Born: February 8, 1975 (age 51) Port Chester, New York, U.S.
- Height: 6 ft 4 in (193 cm)
- Weight: 225 lb (102 kg; 16 st 1 lb)
- Position: Left wing
- Shot: Left
- Played for: Boston Bruins; Ottawa Senators; Tampa Bay Lightning; Pittsburgh Penguins; Calgary Flames
- NHL draft: 151st overall, 1994; Boston Bruins
- Playing career: 1995–2009

André Roy (born February 8, 1975) is an American-born Canadian former professional ice hockey player who played in the National Hockey League (NHL).

== Playing career ==
Roy was born in Port Chester, New York. As a youth, he played in the 1989 Quebec International Pee-Wee Hockey Tournament with a minor ice hockey team from Montreal. Roy played junior ice hockey in the Quebec Major Junior Hockey League.

Roy was drafted by the Boston Bruins, 151st overall in the sixth round of the 1994 NHL entry draft and has also played for the Ottawa Senators, the Tampa Bay Lightning (where he won the Stanley Cup in 2004), the Pittsburgh Penguins and the Calgary Flames. During the 2006–07 season, Roy was placed on waivers by the Penguins and claimed by the Lightning, where he was a popular, though seldom used, enforcer. His toughness, however, brought about consequences for his actions.

=== Controversies ===
On April 2, 2002, Roy received a combined 13-game suspension by the NHL, after prematurely exiting the penalty box and assaulting a linesman the previous night, amid a loss against his hometown New York Rangers. With only seven games remaining that season, the suspension carried over into the first six games of the 2002-2003 season.

Roy was ultimately removed from the Tampa Bay Lightning official roster, after a fallout with then-coach John Tortorella. In an away game against the Philadelphia Flyers, Roy fought Riley Cote twice. After being knocked down from a punch in the latter fight, Roy made a "slash throat" hand gesture toward Cote while on the bench. Tortorella had to physically remove Roy from the bench. For the remainder of the 2007–08 season (about 15 games), Roy was a healthy scratch. On July 20, 2008, Roy signed with the Calgary Flames.

In February 2009, Los Angeles Kings general manager Dean Lombardi attracted skepticism by singling out Roy as a "one-dimensional player." Said Lombardi, "So who's the one-dimensional player? André Roy from Calgary, maybe. They dressed him the other night. He's a battleship. He played, what, two minutes? So, okay, there's one, but I'd like to know how many of those guys there really are."

== Personal life ==
Roy has two brothers, Marc and Kevin. Although born in Port Chester, New York, he was raised in Saint-Jérôme, Quebec and speaks fluent Canadian French. After winning the Stanley Cup in 2004, Roy used his day with the Cup to present an engagement ring to his future wife. They married on July 23, 2005 and have a daughter.

== Career statistics ==
			Regular season					Playoffs
Season	Team	League	GP	G	A	Pts	PIM	GP	G	A	Pts	PIM
1993–94	Beauport Harfangs	QMJHL	33	6	7	13	125	—	—	—	—	—
1993–94	Chicoutimi Saguenéens	QMJHL	32	4	14	18	152	—	—	—	—	—
1994–95	Chicoutimi Saguenéens	QMJHL	20	15	8	23	90	—	—	—	—	—
1994–95	Drummondville Voltigeurs	QMJHL	34	18	13	31	233	—	—	—	—	—
1995–96	Providence Bruins	AHL	58	7	8	15	167	1	0	0	0	10
1995–96	Boston Bruins	NHL	3	0	0	0	0	—	—	—	—	—
1996–97	Providence Bruins	AHL	50	17	11	28	234	—	—	—	—	—
1996–97	Boston Bruins	NHL	10	0	2	2	12	—	—	—	—	—
1997–98	Charlotte Checkers	ECHL	27	10	8	18	132	7	2	3	5	34
1997–98	Providence Bruins	AHL	36	3	11	14	154	—	—	—	—	—
1998–99	Fort Wayne Komets	IHL	65	15	6	21	395	2	0	0	0	11
1999–00	Ottawa Senators	NHL	73	4	3	7	145	5	0	0	0	2
2000–01	Ottawa Senators	NHL	64	3	5	8	169	2	0	0	0	16
2001–02	Ottawa Senators	NHL	56	6	8	14	148	—	—	—	—	—
2001–02	Tampa Bay Lightning	NHL	9	1	1	2	63	—	—	—	—	—
2002–03	Tampa Bay Lightning	NHL	62	10	7	17	119	5	0	1	1	2
2003–04	Tampa Bay Lightning	NHL	33	1	1	2	78	21	1	2	3	61
2005–06	Pittsburgh Penguins	NHL	42	2	1	3	116	—	—	—	—	—
2006–07	Pittsburgh Penguins	NHL	5	0	0	0	12	—	—	—	—	—
2006–07	Tampa Bay Lightning	NHL	51	1	2	3	116	6	0	0	0	17
2007–08	Tampa Bay Lightning	NHL	63	4	3	7	108	—	—	—	—	—
2008–09	Calgary Flames	NHL	44	3	0	3	83	2	0	0	0	0
NHL totals			515	35	33	68	1169	41	1	3	4	98
