= Cory Sarich =

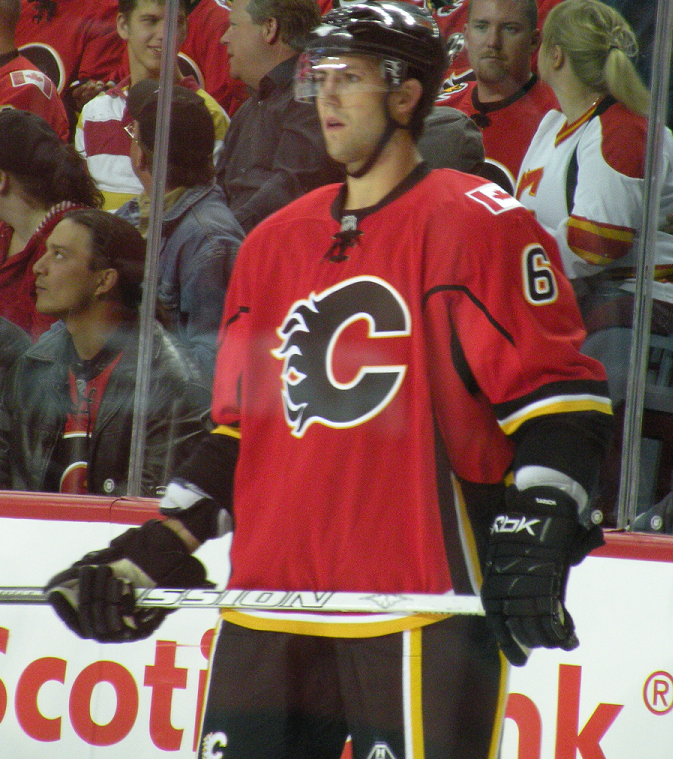
- Sarich with the Calgary Flames in 2008
- Born: August 16, 1978 (age 48) Saskatoon, Saskatchewan, Canada
- Height: 6 ft 4 in (193 cm)
- Weight: 207 lb (94 kg; 14 st 11 lb)
- Position: Defence
- Shot: Right
- Played for: Buffalo Sabres; Tampa Bay Lightning; Calgary Flames; Colorado Avalanche
- NHL draft: 27th overall, 1996; Buffalo Sabres
- Playing career: 1998–2014

Cory Sarich (born August 16, 1978) is a Canadian former professional ice hockey defenceman. He last played for the Colorado Avalanche in the National Hockey League (NHL). Sarich was a second round selection, 27th overall, of the Buffalo Sabres at the 1996 NHL entry draft and has also played for the Tampa Bay Lightning, Calgary Flames and the Colorado Avalanche during a 15-year professional career that has spanned nearly 1,000 NHL games. He was a member of Tampa Bay's 2004 Stanley Cup championship team.

== Playing career ==
Sarich was originally selected in the second round, 27th overall, in the 1996 NHL entry draft by the Buffalo Sabres. After first playing midget hockey with the Saskatoon Contacts, he played the majority of his major junior hockey career in his native Saskatoon with the Blades of the Western Hockey League.

Sarich was traded along with Wayne Primeau and Brian Holzinger from Buffalo, to the Tampa Bay Lightning for Chris Gratton on March 9, 2000, and played with the Stanley Cup-winning team of 2003–04.

After seven seasons within the Lightning organization, Sarich returned to Canada and signed a five-year contract as a free agent with the Calgary Flames on July 1, 2007.

During the 2007–08 season, on December 12, 2007, Sarich became the NHL's reigning iron man when Brendan Morrison was forced to miss a game with wrist complications. He played his 419th consecutive game the day before in a game against Tampa Bay, where Sarich had played four full seasons and 388 games. Sarich's streak came to an end on March 1, 2008 when he missed the game at Phoenix, giving ironman status to Andrew Brunette.

Upon the completion of his initial contract with the Flames, Sarich signed a new two-year contract to remain in Calgary on June 29, 2012. During the lockout-shortened 2012–13 season, Sarich was reduced to a reserve defenseman role, featuring often as a healthy scratch. On March 26, 2013, Sarich appeared in his 900th career game in a 2-0 defeat to the Chicago Blackhawks.

In the off-season, on June 27, 2013, Sarich waived his no-trade clause with the Flames and was traded, along with Alex Tanguay, to the Colorado Avalanche in exchange for David Jones and Shane O'Brien. He appeared in 54 games with the Avalanche during the 2013–14 season, scored one goal and added nine assists. While cycling during off-season training near Invermere, British Columbia, Sarich was struck and seriously injured by a car and ultimately transported by air ambulance to hospital in Calgary. He stated that he suffered "five broken vertebrate and some serious road rash", but expected to make a complete recovery.

== Personal life ==
Sarich grew up in Bladworth, Saskatchewan. He now makes his home in Calgary, Alberta with his wife, Reagan, and their three children. Sarich's brother in-law is former NHL defenseman Nick Schultz, and his brother Rod is a defenseman for the Sheffield Steelers of the British Elite Ice Hockey League. His second cousin Berkly Catton also plays professional ice hockey in the NHL.

== Career statistics ==
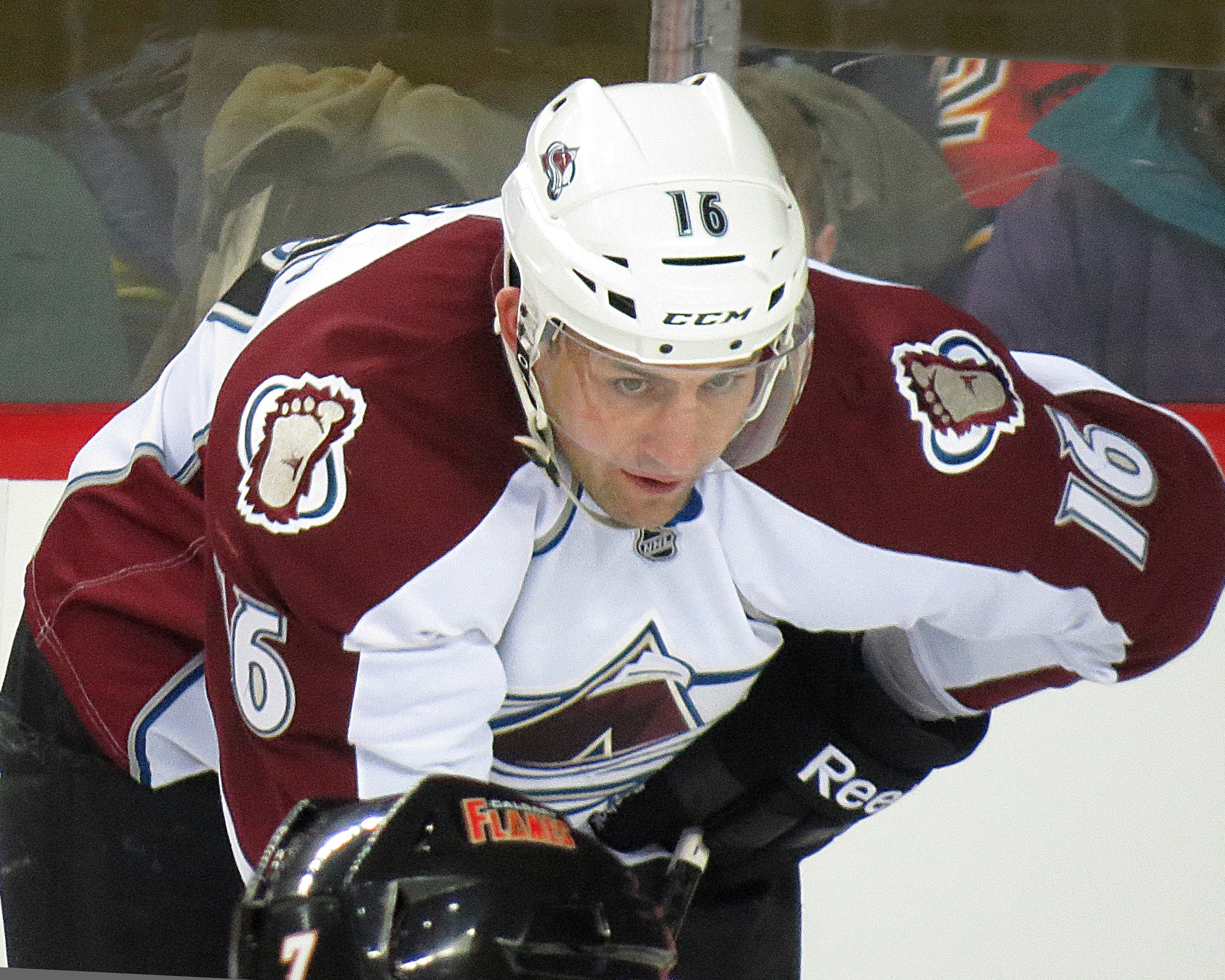
Sarich in December 2013 during his tenure with the Avalanche.

=== Regular season and playoffs ===
| | | | Regular season | | | | | Playoffs |
| Season | Team | League | GP | G | A | Pts | PIM | GP | G | A | Pts | PIM |
|---|---|---|---|---|---|---|---|---|---|---|---|---|
| 1994–95 | Saskatoon Blades | WHL | 6 | 0 | 0 | 0 | 4 | 3 | 0 | 1 | 1 | 0 |
| 1995–96 | Saskatoon Blades | WHL | 59 | 5 | 18 | 23 | 54 | 3 | 0 | 0 | 0 | 4 |
| 1996–97 | Saskatoon Blades | WHL | 58 | 6 | 27 | 33 | 158 | — | — | — | — | — |
| 1997–98 | Saskatoon Blades | WHL | 33 | 5 | 24 | 29 | 90 | — | — | — | — | — |
| 1997–98 | Seattle Thunderbirds | WHL | 13 | 3 | 16 | 19 | 47 | — | — | — | — | — |
| 1998–99 | Buffalo Sabres | NHL | 4 | 0 | 0 | 0 | 0 | — | — | — | — | — |
| 1998–99 | Rochester Americans | AHL | 77 | 3 | 26 | 29 | 82 | 20 | 2 | 4 | 6 | 14 |
| 1999–00 | Rochester Americans | AHL | 15 | 0 | 6 | 6 | 44 | — | — | — | — | — |
| 1999–00 | Buffalo Sabres | NHL | 42 | 0 | 4 | 4 | 35 | — | — | — | — | — |
| 1999–00 | Tampa Bay Lightning | NHL | 17 | 0 | 2 | 2 | 42 | — | — | — | — | — |
| 2000–01 | Detroit Vipers | IHL | 3 | 0 | 2 | 2 | 2 | — | — | — | — | — |
| 2000–01 | Tampa Bay Lightning | NHL | 73 | 1 | 8 | 9 | 106 | — | — | — | — | — |
| 2001–02 | Tampa Bay Lightning | NHL | 72 | 0 | 11 | 11 | 105 | — | — | — | — | — |
| 2001–02 | Springfield Falcons | AHL | 2 | 0 | 0 | 0 | 0 | — | — | — | — | — |
| 2002–03 | Tampa Bay Lightning | NHL | 82 | 5 | 9 | 14 | 63 | 11 | 0 | 2 | 2 | 6 |
| 2003–04 | Tampa Bay Lightning | NHL | 82 | 3 | 16 | 19 | 89 | 23 | 0 | 2 | 2 | 25 |
| 2005–06 | Tampa Bay Lightning | NHL | 82 | 1 | 14 | 15 | 79 | 5 | 0 | 1 | 1 | 4 |
| 2006–07 | Tampa Bay Lightning | NHL | 82 | 0 | 15 | 15 | 70 | 6 | 0 | 0 | 0 | 2 |
| 2007–08 | Calgary Flames | NHL | 80 | 2 | 5 | 7 | 135 | 7 | 0 | 1 | 1 | 4 |
| 2008–09 | Calgary Flames | NHL | 76 | 2 | 18 | 20 | 112 | 5 | 0 | 1 | 1 | 4 |
| 2009–10 | Calgary Flames | NHL | 57 | 1 | 5 | 6 | 58 | — | — | — | — | — |
| 2010–11 | Calgary Flames | NHL | 76 | 4 | 13 | 17 | 75 | — | — | — | — | — |
| 2011–12 | Calgary Flames | NHL | 62 | 1 | 6 | 7 | 66 | — | — | — | — | — |
| 2012–13 | Calgary Flames | NHL | 28 | 0 | 2 | 2 | 16 | — | — | — | — | — |
| 2013–14 | Colorado Avalanche | NHL | 54 | 1 | 9 | 10 | 38 | — | — | — | — | — |
| NHL totals | | | 969 | 21 | 137 | 158 | 1089 | 57 | 0 | 7 | 7 | 45 |

Medal record

Representing (Canada)

Ice Hockey

World Junior Championships
| Gold medal – first place | 1997 Geneva | |

=== International ===
| Year | Team | Event | Result | GP | G | A | Pts | PIM |
|---|---|---|---|---|---|---|---|---|
| 1997 | Canada | WJC | 1st place, gold medalist(s) | 7 | 0 | 0 | 0 | 6 |
| 1998 | Canada | WJC | 8th | 7 | 0 | 1 | 1 | 6 |
| Junior totals | | | | 14 | 0 | 1 | 1 | 12 |

== Awards and honours ==
| Award | Year |
|---|---|
WHL
| West Second All-Star Team | 1998 |
AHL
| All-Rookie Team | 1999 |
NHL
| Stanley Cup | 2004 |
