= Tim Taylor (ice hockey, born 1969) =

Canadian ice hockey player (born 1969)

- Born: February 6, 1969 (age 57) Stratford, Ontario, Canada
- Height: 6 ft 1 in (185 cm)
- Weight: 190 lb (86 kg; 13 st 8 lb)
- Position: Centre
- Shot: Left
- Played for: Detroit Red Wings; Boston Bruins; New York Rangers; Tampa Bay Lightning
- NHL draft: 36th overall, 1988; Washington Capitals
- Playing career: 1989–2008

Tim Taylor (born February 6, 1969) is a Canadian former professional ice hockey centre/left winger who played in the National Hockey League (NHL), and is now the director of player development for the St. Louis Blues of the NHL. As a player, Taylor won two Stanley Cup championships, one with the Detroit Red Wings in 1997 and another with the Tampa Bay Lightning in 2004.

== Playing career ==
Taylor grew up playing minor hockey in his hometown of Stratford, Ontario in the OMHA. He was drafted by the London Knights of the Ontario Hockey League (OHL) in the 16th round (230th overall) in 1986. Taylor did not initially report to the Knights for the following season, and remained at home playing Jr.B. for the Stratford Cullitons of the MWJHL. After considering an option to play in the NCAA, Taylor reported to the Knights in January 1987.

Taylor was drafted in the second round, 36th overall by the Washington Capitals in the 1988 NHL entry draft.

On September 6, 2006, Taylor was named captain of the Tampa Bay Lightning.

On September 6, 2007, Taylor had surgery to correct hip dysplasia, effectively benching him for the 2007–08 NHL season. He retired following the 2007–08 season.

Taylor was nicknamed "The Toolman" throughout his career due to sharing his name with Tim Allen's character on the TV series Home Improvement.

== Personal life ==
Currently Taylor lives in Stratford, Ontario with his wife and two children, Wyatt and Brittany. His brother Chris is also a professional hockey player.

== Career statistics ==
			Regular season					Playoffs
Season	Team	League	GP	G	A	Pts	PIM	GP	G	A	Pts	PIM
1985–86	Stratford Warriors AA	Midget	52	44	39	83	46	—	—	—	—	—
1985–86	Stratford Cullitons	MWJHL	1	0	0	0	0	—	—	—	—	—
1986–87	Stratford Cullitons	MWJHL	31	25	26	51	51	—	—	—	—	—
1986–87	London Knights	OHL	34	7	9	16	11	—	—	—	—	—
1987–88	London Knights	OHL	64	46	50	96	66	12	9	9	18	26
1988–89	London Knights	OHL	61	34	80	114	93	21	21	25	46	58
1989–90	Baltimore Skipjacks	AHL	74	22	21	43	63	9	2	2	4	13
1990–91	Baltimore Skipjacks	AHL	79	25	42	67	75	5	0	1	1	4
1991–92	Baltimore Skipjacks	AHL	65	9	18	27	131	—	—	—	—	—
1992–93	Baltimore Skipjacks	AHL	41	15	16	31	49	—	—	—	—	—
1992–93	Hamilton Canucks	AHL	36	15	22	37	37	—	—	—	—	—
1993–94	Detroit Red Wings	NHL	1	1	0	1	0	—	—	—	—	—
1993–94	Adirondack Red Wings	AHL	79	36	81	117	86	12	2	10	12	12
1994–95	Detroit Red Wings	NHL	22	0	4	4	16	6	0	1	1	12
1995–96	Detroit Red Wings	NHL	72	11	14	25	39	18	0	4	4	4
1996–97	Detroit Red Wings	NHL	44	3	4	7	52	2	0	0	0	0
1997–98	Boston Bruins	NHL	79	20	11	31	57	6	0	0	0	10
1998–99	Boston Bruins	NHL	49	4	7	11	55	12	0	3	3	8
1999–2000	New York Rangers	NHL	76	9	11	20	72	—	—	—	—	—
2000–01	New York Rangers	NHL	38	2	5	7	16	—	—	—	—	—
2001–02	Tampa Bay Lightning	NHL	48	4	4	8	25	—	—	—	—	—
2002–03	Tampa Bay Lightning	NHL	82	4	8	12	38	11	0	1	1	6
2003–04	Tampa Bay Lightning	NHL	82	7	15	22	25	23	2	3	5	31
2005–06	Tampa Bay Lightning	NHL	82	7	6	13	22	5	0	0	0	2
2006–07	Tampa Bay Lightning	NHL	71	1	5	6	16	6	0	0	0	0
AHL totals			374	122	200	322	441	26	4	13	17	29
NHL totals			746	73	94	167	433	89	2	12	14	73

Preceded by Dave Andreychuk	Tampa Bay Lightning captain 2006–08	Succeeded by Vincent Lecavalier
