= Jassen Cullimore =

Canadian ice hockey player (born 1972)

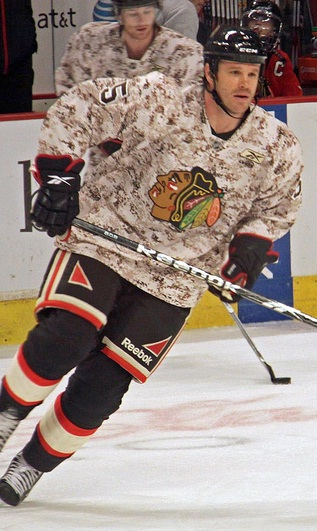
- Born: December 4, 1972 (age 53) Simcoe, Ontario, Canada
- Height: 6 ft 5 in (196 cm)
- Weight: 235 lb (107 kg; 16 st 11 lb)
- Position: Defence
- Shot: Left
- Played for: Vancouver Canucks; Montreal Canadiens; Tampa Bay Lightning; Chicago Blackhawks; Florida Panthers; Iserlohn Roosters
- NHL draft: 29th overall, 1991; Vancouver Canucks
- Playing career: 1992–2012

Jassen Andrew Cullimore (born December 4, 1972) is a Canadian former professional ice hockey defenceman.

Cullimore grew up in Port Dover, Ontario playing the majority of his minor hockey with the Clippers of the OMHA. He played Jr.C. hockey at age 14 for the Caledonia Corvairs and then played as a 15-year-old with the Simcoe Storm Jr.C. club in 1987-88. After being drafted in the third round of the 1988 OHL draft by the Peterborough Petes, Cullimore spent the majority of the 1988-89 season with the Peterborough Road Runners of the Metro Jr.B. Hockey League (OHA).

== Playing career ==
Cullimore was drafted with the 29th pick of the second round of the 1991 NHL entry draft by the Vancouver Canucks. In 1996, he was traded to the Montreal Canadiens for Donald Brashear. He was claimed on waivers by the Tampa Bay Lightning in 1998, where he played until 2004 when he signed a free agent deal with the Chicago Blackhawks after winning the Stanley Cup with Tampa. He remained in Chicago until June 2007, where he was traded back to Montreal in exchange for Sergei Samsonov and Tony Salmelainen. He was released by Montreal soon after. After failing to make the Detroit Red Wings roster during a pre-season tryout in 2007, he signed a free agent deal with Florida. Cullimore then became an unrestricted free agent after the Florida Panthers decided not to re-sign him. He re-signed a one-year deal at the start of the 2008–2009 season with the Florida Panthers.

On February 17, 2010, Cullimore signed a two-way contract with the Chicago Blackhawks, and was assigned to their American Hockey League affiliate, the Rockford IceHogs. Cullimore was called up to Chicago on October 15, 2010.

== Career statistics ==
			Regular season					Playoffs
Season	Team	League	GP	G	A	Pts	PIM	GP	G	A	Pts	PIM
1986–87	Caledonia Corvairs	NDJHL	18	2	0	2	9	—	—	—	—	—
1987–88	Simcoe Rams	NDJHL	35	11	14	25	29	—	—	—	—	—
1988–89	Peterborough Roadrunners	MetJHL	29	11	17	28	88	—	—	—	—	—
1988–89	Peterborough Petes	OHL	20	2	1	3	6	2	0	0	0	0
1989–90	Peterborough Petes	OHL	59	2	6	8	61	11	0	2	2	8
1990–91	Peterborough Petes	OHL	62	8	16	24	74	4	1	0	1	8
1991–92	Peterborough Petes	OHL	54	9	37	46	65	10	3	6	9	8
1992–93	Hamilton Canucks	AHL	56	5	7	12	60	—	—	—	—	—
1993–94	Hamilton Canucks	AHL	71	8	20	28	86	3	0	1	1	2
1994–95	Syracuse Crunch	AHL	33	2	7	9	66	—	—	—	—	—
1994–95	Vancouver Canucks	NHL	34	1	2	3	39	11	0	0	0	12
1995–96	Vancouver Canucks	NHL	27	1	1	2	21	—	—	—	—	—
1996–97	Vancouver Canucks	NHL	3	0	0	0	2	—	—	—	—	—
1996–97	Montreal Canadiens	NHL	49	2	6	8	42	2	0	0	0	2
1997–98	Fredericton Canadiens	AHL	5	1	0	1	8	—	—	—	—	—
1997–98	Montreal Canadiens	NHL	3	0	0	0	4	—	—	—	—	—
1997–98	Tampa Bay Lightning	NHL	25	1	2	3	22	—	—	—	—	—
1998–99	Tampa Bay Lightning	NHL	78	5	12	17	81	—	—	—	—	—
1999–2000	Tampa Bay Lightning	NHL	46	1	1	2	66	—	—	—	—	—
2000–01	Tampa Bay Lightning	NHL	74	1	6	7	80	—	—	—	—	—
2001–02	Tampa Bay Lightning	NHL	78	4	9	13	58	—	—	—	—	—
2002–03	Tampa Bay Lightning	NHL	28	1	3	4	31	11	1	1	2	4
2003–04	Tampa Bay Lightning	NHL	79	2	5	7	58	11	0	2	2	6
2005–06	Chicago Blackhawks	NHL	54	1	6	7	53	—	—	—	—	—
2006–07	Chicago Blackhawks	NHL	65	1	6	7	64	—	—	—	—	—
2007–08	Rochester Americans	AHL	3	0	1	1	4	—	—	—	—	—
2007–08	Florida Panthers	NHL	65	3	10	13	38	—	—	—	—	—
2008–09	Florida Panthers	NHL	68	2	8	10	37	—	—	—	—	—
2009–10	Rockford IceHogs	AHL	59	2	6	8	52	—	—	—	—	—
2010–11	Rockford IceHogs	AHL	41	2	7	9	26	—	—	—	—	—
2010–11	Chicago Blackhawks	NHL	36	0	8	8	8	—	—	—	—	—
2011–12	Iserlohn Roosters	DEL	51	2	6	8	44	2	0	2	2	0
NHL totals			812	26	85	111	704	35	1	3	4	24
