= Nolan Pratt =

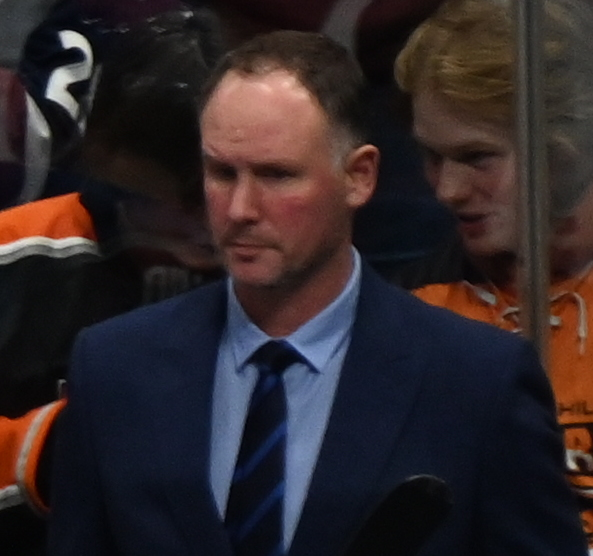
- Pratt in 2023
- Born: August 14, 1975 (age 51) Fort McMurray, Alberta, Canada
- Height: 6 ft 3 in (191 cm)
- Weight: 207 lb (94 kg; 14 st 11 lb)
- Position: Defence
- Shot: Left
- Played for: Hartford Whalers; Carolina Hurricanes; Colorado Avalanche; Tampa Bay Lightning; Buffalo Sabres; Amur Khabarovsk; Lukko
- NHL draft: 115th overall, 1993; Hartford Whalers
- Playing career: 1995–2011

Nolan William Pratt (born August 14, 1975) is a Canadian former professional ice hockey defenceman. He is currently an assistant coach for his former club, the Colorado Avalanche of the National Hockey League (NHL).

== Playing career ==
Pratt was selected in the 5th round, 115th overall, in the 1993 NHL entry draft by the Hartford Whalers from the Portland Winter Hawks of the Western Hockey League. Pratt made his NHL debut in the 1996–97 season with the Hartford Whalers, in the last year of the franchise. Pratt would then move with the team to the Carolina Hurricanes.

On June 24, 2000, he was traded along with a 2000 1st round pick (Václav Nedorost), a 2000 2nd round pick (Jared Aulin), and Philadelphia's 2nd round pick in 2000 (Argis Saviels) to Colorado for Sandis Ozolinsh and a second round pick (Tomas Kurka).

After the 2000–01 season, on June 24, 2001, Pratt was traded by the newly crowned Stanley Cup champions, the Colorado Avalanche, to the Tampa Bay Lightning for a 2001 NHL entry draft 6th round pick (Scott Horvath).

Pratt would help the Lightning, in the 2003–04 season, win the Stanley Cup. This marked Pratt's second Cup win.

Pratt was signed as a free agent by the Buffalo Sabres on November 1, 2007. With the Sabres, Pratt was most often paired with Dmitri Kalinin.

On September 23, 2008, Pratt, a free agent, was invited to the Dallas Stars training camp however was released just three days later. With no other NHL opportunities, Pratt signed with Russian team Amur Khabarovsk of the KHL on October 10, 2008.

After two seasons with Khabarovsk, Pratt left as a free agent and on November 8, 2010, signed a one-year contract with Lukko of the Finnish SM-Liiga.

== Coaching career ==
After his playing career, Pratt served as an assistant coach for the Springfield Falcons of the AHL from 2011 to 2016. On July 16, 2015, Pratt's former club the Colorado Avalanche hired him as an assistant coach.

== Personal ==
Pratt is the older brother of Harlan Pratt, a professional ice hockey defenseman who was selected by the Pittsburgh Penguins in the 1997 NHL entry draft who has played more than 900 games across North America and Europe.

== Career statistics ==
			Regular season					Playoffs
Season	Team	League	GP	G	A	Pts	PIM	GP	G	A	Pts	PIM
1991–92	Portland Winter Hawks	WHL	22	2	9	11	13	6	1	3	4	12
1992–93	Portland Winter Hawks	WHL	70	4	19	23	97	16	2	7	9	31
1993–94	Portland Winter Hawks	WHL	72	4	32	36	105	10	1	2	3	14
1994–95	Portland Winter Hawks	WHL	72	6	37	43	196	9	1	6	7	10
1995–96	Richmond Renegades	ECHL	4	1	0	1	2	—	—	—	—	—
1995–96	Springfield Falcons	AHL	62	2	6	8	72	2	0	0	0	0
1996–97	Springfield Falcons	AHL	66	1	18	19	127	17	0	3	3	18
1996–97	Hartford Whalers	NHL	9	0	2	2	6	—	—	—	—	—
1997–98	Beast of New Haven	AHL	54	3	15	18	135	—	—	—	—	—
1997–98	Carolina Hurricanes	NHL	23	0	2	2	44	—	—	—	—	—
1998–99	Carolina Hurricanes	NHL	61	1	14	15	95	3	0	0	0	2
1999–00	Carolina Hurricanes	NHL	64	3	1	4	90	—	—	—	—	—
2000–01	Colorado Avalanche	NHL	46	1	2	3	40	—	—	—	—	—
2001–02	Tampa Bay Lightning	NHL	46	0	3	3	51	—	—	—	—	—
2002–03	Tampa Bay Lightning	NHL	67	1	7	8	35	4	0	1	1	0
2003–04	Tampa Bay Lightning	NHL	58	1	3	4	42	20	0	0	0	8
2004–05	EV Duisburg	2.GBun	10	2	2	4	14	—	—	—	—	—
2005–06	Tampa Bay Lightning	NHL	82	0	9	9	60	5	0	0	0	7
2006–07	Tampa Bay Lightning	NHL	81	1	7	8	44	6	0	0	0	5
2007–08	Buffalo Sabres	NHL	55	1	6	7	22	—	—	—	—	—
2008–09	Amur Khabarovsk	KHL	35	1	9	10	28	—	—	—	—	—
2009–10	Amur Khabarovsk	KHL	46	2	9	11	63	—	—	—	—	—
2010–11	Lukko	SM-l	27	1	1	2	20	12	0	0	0	18
NHL totals			592	9	56	65	537	38	0	1	1	22

== Awards and honours ==
Award	Year
NHL
Stanley Cup (Colorado Avalanche)	2000–01
Stanley Cup (Tampa Bay Lightning)	2003–04
Stanley Cup (Colorado Avalanche assistant coach)	2021–22
