= List of Colorado Avalanche records =

This is a list of franchise records for the Colorado Avalanche of the National Hockey League. These include records held by both the Avalanche and the Quebec Nordiques.

== Team records ==
=== Single season ===
Most points	121	2025-26
Most wins	56	2021-22
Most losses	61	1989–90
Most ties	17	1997–98
Most goals for	360	1983–84
Most goals against	407	1989–90
Fewest points	31	1989–90
Fewest wins	12	1989–90
Fewest losses	13; 16	1994–95 (shortened season); 2000–01
Fewest ties	5	1987–88, 1994–95 (shortened season)
Fewest goals for	185; 212	1994–95 (shortened season); 2001–02
Fewest goals against	134; 169	1994–95 (shortened season); 2001–02
Most penalty minutes	2104	1989–90
Fewest penalty minutes	770; 864	1994–95 (shortened season); 2006–07
Most shutouts	11	2001–02 (Patrick Roy 9, David Aebischer 2)

=== Single game ===
Most goals	12	02/01/83 v. Hartford (12-3); 10/20/84 v. Toronto (12-3); 12/05/95 v. San Jose (12-2)

=== Streaks ===
Winning streaks
Overall	12	January 10 – February 7, 1999 and in 2018
Home	18	November 11, 2021 – January 30, 2022
Away	10	March 13 – April 9, 2022
Losing streaks
Overall	14	October 21 – November 19, 1990
Home	10	November 23 - December 31, 2016
Away	18	January 18 – April 1, 1990
Undefeated streaks
Overall	12	December 23, 1996 – January 20, 1997 (9 wins, 3 ties)
Home	14	November 19, 1983 – January 21, 1984 (11 wins, 3 ties)
Away	10	January 10 – March 3, 1999 (8 wins, 2 ties)
Winless streaks
Overall	17	October 21 - November 25, 1990 (15 losses, 2 ties)
Home	11	November 14 - December 26, 1989 (7 losses, 4 ties)
Away	33	October 8, 1991 - February 27, 1992 (25 losses, 8 ties)
Sold out home games
487 games		9 November 1995 – 14 October 2006^{†}

† Denotes an NHL record.

== Individual records ==
=== Career ===
Most seasons	20	Joe Sakic
Most games	1,378	Joe Sakic
Most goals	625	Joe Sakic
Most assists	1,016	Joe Sakic
Most points	1,641	Joe Sakic
Most penalty minutes	1,562	Dale Hunter
Most shutouts	37	Patrick Roy
Most consecutive games played	312	Dale Hunter (October 9, 1980 - March 13, 1984)
Most Stanley Cups	2	Adam Foote, Peter Forsberg, Jon Klemm, Patrick Roy, Joe Sakic, Stephane Yelle

=== Season ===
Most goals	57	Michel Goulet (1982–83)
Most assists	93	Peter Stastny (1981–82)
Most points	140	Nathan MacKinnon (2023–24, 51G, 89A)
Most penalty minutes	259	Jeff Odgers (1998–99)
Most points (defenceman)	92	Cale Makar (2024-25, 30G, 62A)
Most points (rookie)	109	Peter Stastny (1980–81, 39G, 70A)
Most wins	41	Semyon Varlamov (2013–14)
Most shutouts	9	Patrick Roy (2001–02)
Most Stanley Cups	3	1996–2001-2022

=== Single game ===
Most goals	5	Mats Sundin (March 5, 1992); Mike Ricci (February 17, 1994)
Most assists	5	Six times
Most points	8	Peter Stastny (February 22, 1981; 4G, 4A); Anton Stastny (February 22, 1981; 3G, 5A)

== See also ==
- List of Colorado Avalanche players
- List of NHL statistical leaders
- Team records in the National Hockey League
- Individual records in the National Hockey League
