= José Théodore =

Canadian ice hockey player (born 1976)

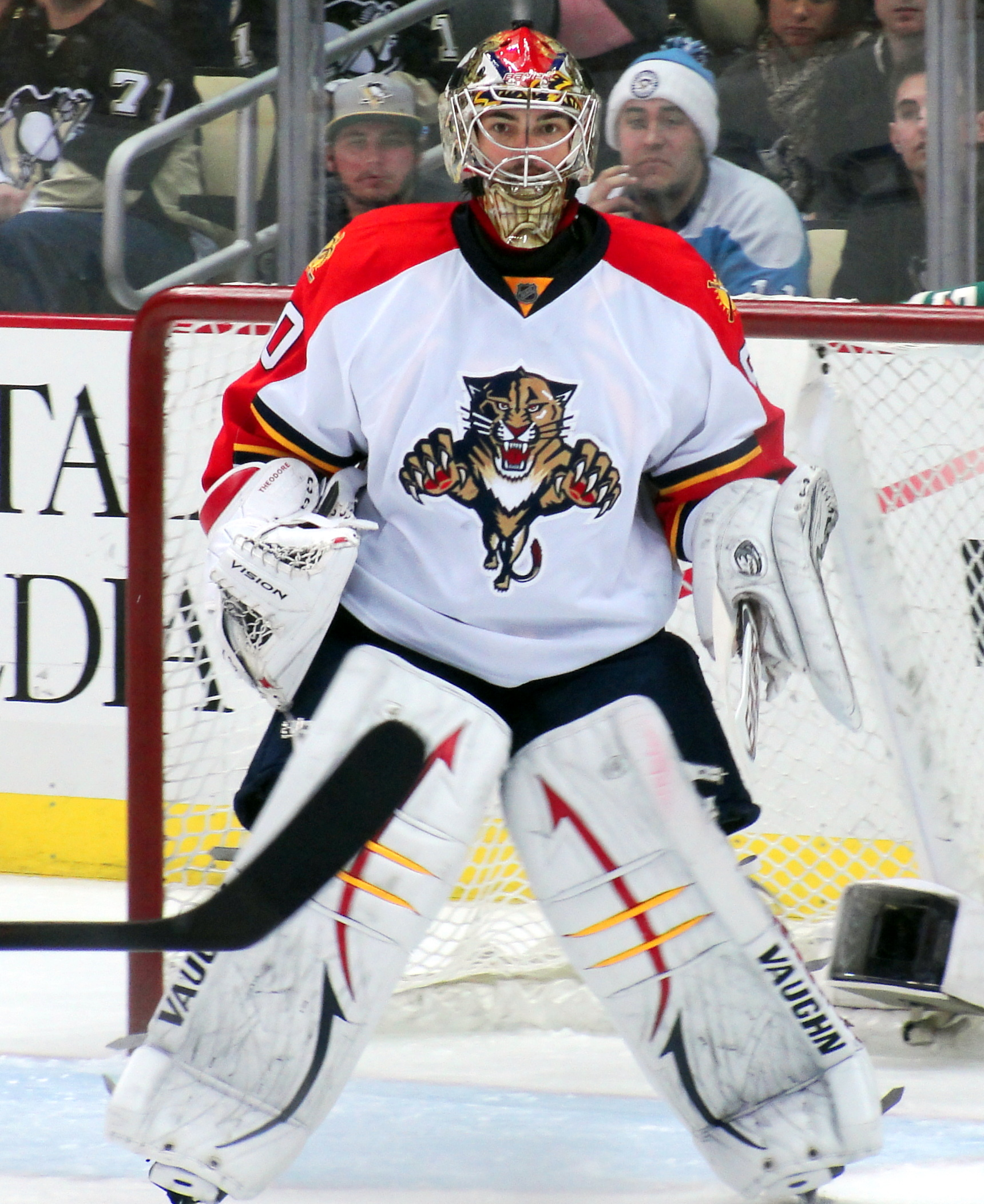
- Théodore with the Florida Panthers in 2012
- Born: September 13, 1976 (age 49) Laval, Quebec, Canada
- Height: 5 ft 11 in (180 cm)
- Weight: 180 lb (82 kg; 12 st 12 lb)
- Position: Goaltender
- Caught: Right
- Played for: Montreal Canadiens; Djurgårdens IF; Colorado Avalanche; Washington Capitals; Minnesota Wild; Florida Panthers
- National team: Canada
- NHL draft: 44th overall, 1994; Montreal Canadiens
- Playing career: 1995–2013

José Nicolas Théodore (born September 13, 1976) is a Canadian former professional ice hockey goaltender. He played in the National Hockey League (NHL) for the Montreal Canadiens, Colorado Avalanche, Washington Capitals, Minnesota Wild, and Florida Panthers.

Théodore played major junior in the Quebec Major Junior Hockey League (QMJHL), where he won a President's Cup as QMJHL champions and competed in the Memorial Cup with the Hull Olympiques in 1995. He won both the Ford Cup as the top defensive player and Guy Lafleur Trophy as playoff MVP in 1995 and is a two-time QMJHL Second Team All-Star. Drafted 44th overall by the Canadiens in 1994, Théodore played eight seasons in Montreal, where he won the Vezina and Hart trophies, both in 2002. In 2006, he was traded to the Colorado Avalanche, where he played two full seasons. Théodore also played two seasons for the Washington Capitals. Internationally, Théodore won a gold medal with Canada at the 1996 World Junior Championships, where he was named the tournament's best goaltender. He also started for Canada at the 2001 World Championships and was a backup for the 2004 World Cup.

== Playing career ==
As a youth, Théodore played in the 1990 Quebec International Pee-Wee Hockey Tournament with the Richelieu 47 minor ice hockey team.

=== QMJHL career (1992–1996) ===
Théodore played major junior in the QMJHL for four seasons with the St-Jean Lynx and Hull Olympiques. At age 16, he began his major junior rookie season in 1992–93, splitting goaltending duties with Jean-Pascal Lemelin. He assumed the starting position the following season in 1993–94, recording a 3.61 goals against average (GAA) with a 20–29–6 record. Théodore was drafted that off-season by the Montreal Canadiens 44th overall in the 1994 NHL entry draft.

Théodore returned to the Lynx upon his draft in 1994–95, but was traded early in the season to the Hull Olympiques. In 43 games with his new team in the regular season, Théodore posted a 2.97 GAA with a 27-14-1 record to be awarded the Ford Cup as the top defensive player and be named to the QMJHL second All-Star team. Théodore went on to lead the Olympiques to the President's Cup as QMJHL champions, winning the Guy Lafleur Trophy as playoff MVP. Earning a berth in the 1995 Memorial Cup, the Olympiques finished in last place in the tournament.

Following the 1995 major junior playoffs, Théodore made his professional debut, being assigned to the American Hockey League (AHL), where he played one game for the Fredericton Canadiens, Montreal's minor league affiliate, in the 1995 Calder Cup playoffs.

Théodore played his fourth and final QMJHL season with the Olympiques in 1995–96. Although he was named to his second consecutive second All-Star team, the Olympiques failed to defend their QMJHL title. Théodore was injured and missed the first two rounds of the playoffs. He returned later in the semi-final against les Harfangs de Beauport, who were coached by former Hull Olympiques' coach Alain Vigneault. The Olympiques were defeated in five games by les Harfangs, which were led by future NHL goaltender Martin Biron. This was redemption for les Harfangs and Biron, who were defeated by Théodore and the Olympiques in five games in the previous post-season, in 1994–95.

=== Montreal Canadiens ===
Théodore spent his first three seasons with the Montreal Canadiens organization, splitting time in the NHL and the AHL, with Montreal's minor league affiliate, the Fredericton Canadiens. He made his Stanley Cup playoffs debut in 1997, winning a 4–3 triple overtime game against the New Jersey Devils, making 56 saves. The following year, he appeared in three playoff games for the Canadiens against the Buffalo Sabres, despite not playing in any regular season games for them that campaign.

=== Rise to prominence (1999–2004) ===
Théodore became a full-time NHLer in 1999–2000, sharing starts with Jeff Hackett. In his first full NHL season, Théodore posted a 12–13–2 record with a 2.10 GAA and .919 save percentage, along with five shutouts. He assumed the starting role over Hackett the following season in 2000–01 and went 20–29–5 in 59 games. During a game on January 2, 2001, Théodore became the sixth goaltender to directly score a goal when he attempted to clear the puck from the defensive zone against the New York Islanders and scored into the empty net, which was vacated by John Vanbiesbrouck for the extra attacker. He became the first NHL goalie to directly score a goal and record a shutout in the same game, as the Canadiens defeated the Islanders 3–0. But he was the second goaltender to be credited with a goal and a shutout in the same game, after Damian Rhodes, who was credited with a goal in a 6–0 win on January 2, 1999.

Théodore emerged as a world-class goaltender in 2001–02, when he turned in a Vezina- and Hart Memorial Trophy-winning performance with a 30–24–10 record, 2.11 GAA and .931 save percentage. Interestingly, both awards resulted in a tie for first place and both times, the two leading finalists had exactly 70% of the vote. Theodore won both as a result of having more first place votes over Jarome Iginla (Hart) and Patrick Roy (Vezina).

He led the Canadiens into the playoffs as the eighth and final seed in the Eastern Conference, and was a pivotal factor in upsetting the top-ranked Boston Bruins in the first round. He became an immediate fan favorite in the city of Montreal. However, the Canadiens were eliminated by the Carolina Hurricanes the following round in six games.

Théodore was unable to match his previous season's performance in 2002–03 and ended the season with significantly lower statistics (2.90 GAA and .909 save percentage) to go with a losing record that saw the Canadiens unable to make the playoffs. He bounced back in 2003–04 with a GAA of 2.27 and save percentage of .919. During the season, he participated with the Canadiens in the 2003 Heritage Classic, the NHL's first ever outdoor hockey game. The game was held at Commonwealth Stadium against the Edmonton Oilers, a game which Montreal won 4–3. Playing in sub-zero temperatures, Théodore famously wore a toque over his goalie helmet. He ended the season with a second 30-win campaign, helping the Canadiens qualify for the 2004 playoffs as the seventh seed. They upset the Boston Bruins for the second time in three years in a seven-game opening series, before being eliminated by the top-seeded, eventual Stanley Cup champion Tampa Bay Lightning in four.

Due to the 2004–05 NHL lockout, Théodore went overseas to play for Djurgårdens IF of the Swedish Elitserien.

When NHL play resumed in 2005–06, it was revealed on February 9, 2006, he had failed a random drug test conducted prior to the 2006 Winter Olympics. The failed test was later revealed to be caused by a prescription hair loss medication Propecia, which Théodore had been taking legally for eight years. Propecia contains the drug finasteride, which can be used as a masking agent for the performance-enhancing drug nandrolone among weight-trainers and bodybuilders, but it is not a performance-enhancing drug in itself. Théodore did not face any punishment from the NHL because he had applied and received approval for a therapeutic use exception. However, he did receive a two-year suspension from international play.

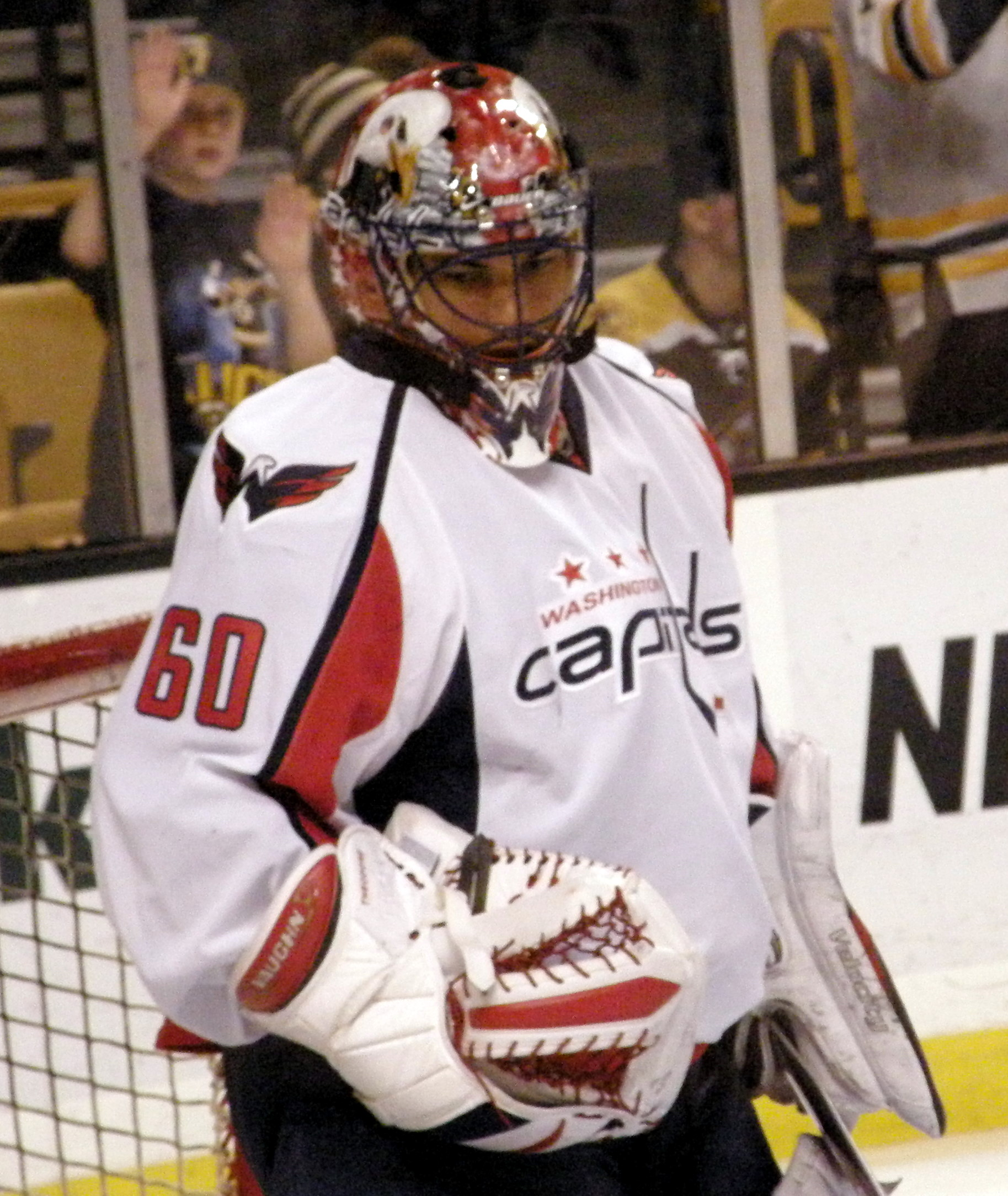
Theodore with the Washington Capitals in 2009–10

In addition to the drug controversy, Théodore's play with the Canadiens was marked by a significant drop and he was being outperformed by backup Cristobal Huet. Consequently, he was traded at the trade deadline to the Colorado Avalanche on March 8, 2006, in exchange for Swiss goaltender David Aebischer.

=== Colorado Avalanche ===
At the time of the trade, Théodore was on the injured reserve; he strained his Achilles tendon after slipping on the winter ice outside his home. He came off the injured reserve with enough time to play in the last five regular season Avalanche games. His 3.04 GAA with the Avalanche combined with his 3.46 rating earned from his previous play with the Canadiens marked the worst GAA of his career. He was nonetheless designated the starting goalie for the playoffs over Peter Budaj, playing in all nine of Colorado's games over the first two rounds before the Avalanche were swept in four games in the second round by the Anaheim Mighty Ducks.

Théodore's play did not see much improvement the following season, in 2006–07, as he lost the starting role to Budaj with a 13–15–1 record, 3.26 GAA and .891 save percentage. He saw a resurgence in 2007–08 and resumed the starting role with a 2.40 GAA and .910 save percentage. He was able to lead the Avalanche to the second round of the 2008 Stanley Cup Playoffs, though they would be dominated by the Detroit Red Wings in a four-game sweep. In 10 games played during the 2008 playoffs, he recorded a 3.15 goals-against-average.

=== Washington Capitals ===
On July 1, 2008, he parted ways with the Avalanche in the off-season and signed a two-year, $9 million contract with the Washington Capitals. He replaced long-time Capitals starter Olaf Kölzig and the previous season's acquisition (as well as former Canadiens teammate) Cristobal Huet, both having departed in free agency. Joining a team that featured young talents Alexander Semin, Nicklas Bäckström, Mike Green and Alexander Ovechkin, Théodore helped lead the Capitals to a division title and entered the 2009 playoffs as the second seed. However, after allowing four goals in a Game 1 loss to the New York Rangers in the opening round, he was pulled in favour of backup Semyon Varlamov. In 2010, Théodore had a 30–7–7 record and tied a Capitals franchise record for consecutive wins (10) and ended the season on a 20–0–4 streak. He started the playoffs but was pulled in Game 2 and replaced again by Varlamov. Théodore did not play any more games as the Capitals were eliminated in seven games in the first round of playoffs, as Jaroslav Halák and the Montreal Canadiens won three consecutive games to overcome a 3–1 deficit to win the series four games to three. Théodore won the Bill Masterton Memorial Trophy in 2010.

=== Minnesota Wild ===
The Minnesota Wild had their backup goaltender, Josh Harding, tear the Anterior cruciate ligament (ACL) and medial collateral ligament (MCL) in his right knee in a pre-season game away against the St. Louis Blues that forced him to miss the entire 2010–11 season. In need of a netminder the Wild signed Théodore to a one-year, $1.1 million contract to serve as backup to Niklas Bäckström. Théodore had a solid year posting a .916 save percentage and a 2.71 goals against average while winning 15 games, among them his 250th career victory on January 2, 2011, with a 6–5 overtime victory against the Phoenix Coyotes.

=== Florida Panthers ===
After an impressive year as a backup in Minnesota, Théodore signed a two-year, $3 million contract with the Florida Panthers on July 1, 2011, to replace Tomáš Vokoun as Florida's starting goaltender. On December 8, 2011, Théodore played in his 600th regular season NHL game, against the Boston Bruins. He recorded 22 wins during the season, as he helped the Panthers return to the playoffs for the first time since 2000. Despite having home ice advantage in the first round, the Panthers would lose Game 7 to the New Jersey Devils in double overtime, 3–2, with Théodore stopping 33 of 36 shots. He would spend one more year as Florida's starter, which was cut short by injury, and then he was not retained by the club in the summer of 2013.

== International play ==
Medal record

Representing Canada

Ice hockey

World Junior Championships
Gold medal – first place	1996	

Théodore played for Team Canada at the 1996 World Junior Championships in Boston during his fourth major junior season. He posted a 4–0–0 record with a 1.50 GAA to earn Best Goaltender and Tournament All-Star honours, en route to Canada's fourth straight gold medal at the tournament.

Théodore made his debut for Canada's men's team in the 2001 World Championship. He recorded two shutouts and a 1.63 GAA, but Canada was defeated in the quarter-finals by the United States. In 2004, he played backup for Team Canada at the World Cup, seeing Canada defeat Finland in the final to capture the championship.

== Personal life ==
Théodore's father, Theodore (Ted) Théodore, is of Macedonian descent, while his mother is of Spanish descent, making Jose half Macedonian and half Spanish. On December 15, 2004, his father and half-brother pleaded guilty to charges of loansharking and possession of a restricted weapon. In February 2005, the 71-year-old Ted Théodore was issued a $30,000 fine, but no jail time.

Théodore has one child, Romi (born March 22, 2006), with his wife Stéphanie Cloutier. Cloutier gave birth to their second child, Chace, in the summer of 2009. Chace was born prematurely; on August 20, 2009, the Washington Capitals and Théodore's sister-in-law reported Chace had died after surviving two months.

Théodore founded Saves for Kids, a charity to benefit the NICU at Children's National Medical Center in Washington, D.C.

In December 2013, TVA Sports announced Théodore would join the network as an analyst for its NHL coverage beginning in the 2014–15 season. In 2014, he joined the staff of the Journal de Montréal as a hockey columnist.

== Career statistics ==
=== Regular season and playoffs ===
			Regular season										Playoffs
Season	Team	League	GP	W	L	T	OTL	MIN	GA	SO	GAA	SV%	GP	W	L	MIN	GA	SO	GAA	SV%
1991–92	Richelieu Riverains	QAAA	24	9	13	2	—	1440	96	0	3.99	—	5	2	3	295	26	0	5.28	—
1992–93	Saint-Jean Lynx	QMJHL	34	12	16	2	—	1775	111	0	3.78	.871	3	0	2	175	11	0	3.77	.911
1993–94	Saint-Jean Lynx	QMJHL	57	20	29	6	—	3225	194	0	3.61	.882	5	1	4	296	18	0	3.65	.910
1994–95	Saint-Jean Lynx	QMJHL	14	5	8	1	—	833	67	0	4.83	.860	—	—	—	—	—	—	—	—
1994–95	Hull Olympiques	QMJHL	43	27	14	1	—	2521	126	5	3.00	.901	21	15	6	1263	59	1	2.80	.898
1994–95	Hull Olympiques	MC	—	—	—	—	—	—	—	—	—	—	3	0	3	150	13	0	5.20	—
1995–96	Hull Olympiques	QMJHL	48	33	11	2	—	2807	158	0	3.38	.889	5	2	3	299	20	0	4.01	.905
1995–96	Montreal Canadiens	NHL	1	0	0	0	—	9	1	0	6.69	.500	—	—	—	—	—	—	—	—
1996–97	Montreal Canadiens	NHL	16	5	6	2	—	821	53	0	3.87	.896	2	1	1	168	7	0	2.51	.935
1996–97	Fredericton Canadiens	AHL	26	12	12	0	—	1469	87	0	3.55	.898	—	—	—	—	—	—	—	—
1997–98	Fredericton Canadiens	AHL	53	20	23	8	—	3053	145	2	2.85	.918	4	1	3	237	13	0	3.28	.901
1997–98	Montreal Canadiens	NHL	—	—	—	—	—	—	—	—	—	—	3	0	1	120	1	0	0.50	.971
1998–99	Montreal Canadiens	NHL	18	4	12	0	—	913	50	1	3.29	.877	—	—	—	—	—	—	—	—
1998–99	Fredericton Canadiens	AHL	27	12	13	2	—	1609	77	2	2.87	.917	13	8	5	694	35	1	3.03	.926
1999–00	Montreal Canadiens	NHL	30	12	13	2	—	1655	58	5	2.10	.919	—	—	—	—	—	—	—	—
2000–01	Montreal Canadiens	NHL	59	20	29	5	—	3298	141	2	2.57	.909	—	—	—	—	—	—	—	—
2000–01	Quebec Citadelles	AHL	3	3	0	0	—	180	9	0	3.00	.886	—	—	—	—	—	—	—	—
2001–02	Montreal Canadiens	NHL	67	30	24	10	—	3864	136	7	2.11	.931	12	6	6	686	35	0	3.06	.915
2002–03	Montreal Canadiens	NHL	57	20	31	6	—	3419	165	2	2.90	.908	—	—	—	—	—	—	—	—
2003–04	Montreal Canadiens	NHL	67	33	28	5	—	3961	150	6	2.27	.919	11	4	7	678	27	1	2.39	.919
2004–05	Djurgårdens IF	SEL	17	—	—	—	—	1024	42	0	2.46	.917	12	—	—	728	27	0	2.23	.922
2005–06	Montreal Canadiens	NHL	38	17	15	—	5	2114	122	0	3.46	.881	—	—	—	—	—	—	—	—
2005–06	Colorado Avalanche	NHL	5	1	3	—	1	296	15	0	3.04	.887	9	4	5	573	29	0	3.04	.902
2006–07	Colorado Avalanche	NHL	33	13	15	—	1	1748	95	0	3.26	.891	—	—	—	—	—	—	—	—
2007–08	Colorado Avalanche	NHL	53	28	21	—	3	3028	123	3	2.44	.910	10	4	6	514	27	0	3.15	.906
2007–08	Lake Erie Monsters	AHL	1	0	1	—	0	59	3	0	3.02	.875	—	—	—	—	—	—	—	—
2008–09	Washington Capitals	NHL	57	32	17	—	5	3287	157	2	2.87	.900	2	0	1	97	6	0	3.72	.818
2009–10	Washington Capitals	NHL	47	30	7	—	7	2586	121	1	2.81	.911	2	0	1	81	5	0	3.70	.875
2010–11	Minnesota Wild	NHL	32	15	11	—	3	1793	81	1	2.71	.916	—	—	—	—	—	—	—	—
2011–12	Florida Panthers	NHL	53	22	16	—	11	3049	125	3	2.46	.917	5	2	2	268	11	1	2.46	.919
2012–13	Florida Panthers	NHL	15	4	6	—	3	766	42	0	3.29	.893	—	—	—	—	—	—	—	—
NHL totals			643	286	254	30	39	36,607	1,635	33	2.68	.909	56	21	30	3,185	148	2	2.79	.912

=== International ===
Year	Team	Event	GP	W	L	T	MIN	GA	SO	GAA	SV%
1996	Canada	WJC	4	4	0	0	240	6	0	1.50
2000	Canada	WC	8	5	3	0	478	13	2	1.63	.932
2004	Canada	WCH	—	—	—	—	—	—	—	—	—

== Awards ==
=== QMJHL ===
- Named to the second All-Star team in 1995 and 1996
- Won the Ford Cup as top defensive player in 1995
- Won the Guy Lafleur Trophy as playoff MVP in 1995
- Won the President's Cup with the Hull Olympiques in 1995

=== NHL ===
- Won the Vezina Trophy in 2002
- Won the Hart Memorial Trophy in 2002
- Won the Roger Crozier Saving Grace Award in 2002
- Named to the second All-Star team in 2002
- Played in the NHL All-Star Game in 2002 and 2004
- Won the Bill Masterton Memorial Trophy in 2010

=== International ===
- Named to the World Junior Championship All-Star team in 1996
- Named the World Junior Championships' Best Goaltender in 1996

== See also ==
- List of Colorado Avalanche players
- List of Montreal Canadiens players
- List of goaltenders who have scored a goal in an NHL game

Awards and achievements
Preceded by Dominik Hašek	Winner of the Vezina Trophy; 2002	Succeeded by Martin Brodeur
Preceded by Joe Sakic	Winner of the Hart Memorial Trophy; 2002	Succeeded by Peter Forsberg
Preceded by Marty Turco	Winner of the Crozier Award; 2002	Succeeded by Marty Turco
Preceded by Steve Sullivan	Bill Masterton Memorial Trophy; 2010	Succeeded by Ian Laperrière
