= List of Colorado Avalanche players =

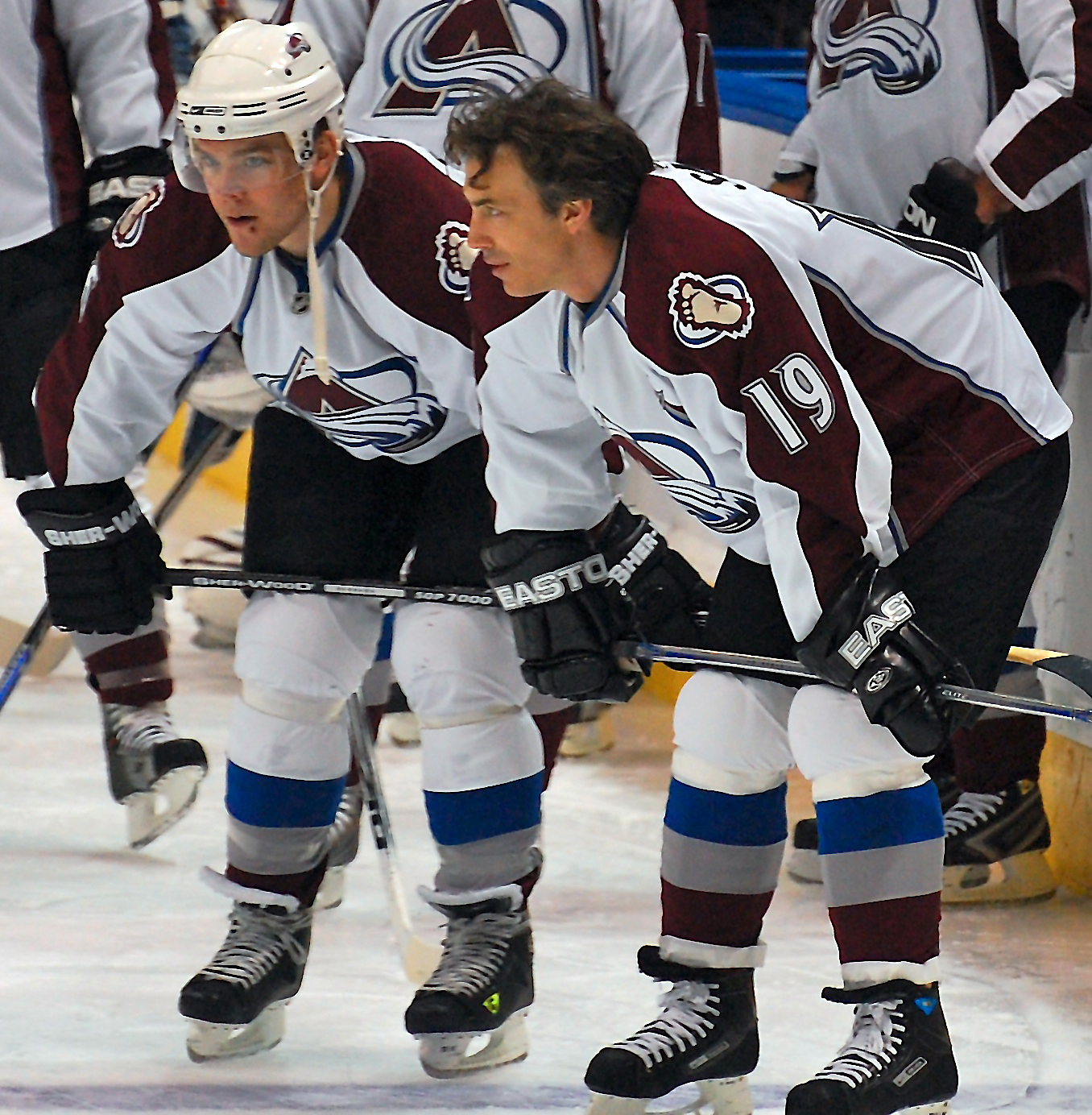
Long-time captain Joe Sakic stands beside Paul Stastny before a game.

The Colorado Avalanche are a professional ice hockey team based in Denver, Colorado, United States. They are members of the Central Division of the Western Conference of the National Hockey League (NHL). The Avalanche arrived in Denver in 1995 after playing since 1972 as the Quebec Nordiques. Since their arrival, over 190 players have played at least one NHL game for the Avalanche. Forty-one of those players have won a Stanley Cup championship with the Avalanche. Six of those players—Adam Foote, Peter Forsberg, Jon Klemm, Patrick Roy, Joe Sakic and Stephane Yelle—were members of both Cup-winning teams in 1996 and 2001. Joe Sakic is the franchise leader in goals, assists and points.

Six former players have had their number retired by the Avalanche. Ray Bourque's #77 was retired November 24, 2001, Patrick Roy's #33 was retired October 28, 2003, long-time captain Joe Sakic's #19 was retired October 1, 2009, Peter Forsberg's #21 was retired October 8, 2011, Adam Foote's #52 was retired November 2, 2013, and Milan Hejduk's #23 was retired January 6, 2018. Six players have been inducted into the Hockey Hall of Fame: Jari Kurri, Rob Blake, Ray Bourque, Joe Sakic, Peter Forsberg, and Patrick Roy. Kurri and Bourque played only the final season of their careers in Colorado, while Roy arrived in the team's first season in Denver, remaining with the Avalanche until his retirement in 2003 as the NHL's all-time wins leader.

== Key ==
Appeared in an Avalanche game during the 2025–26 NHL season or is still part of the organization.
Stanley Cup winner, retired jersey or elected to the Hockey Hall of Fame

Abbreviations
Nat	Nationality
GP	Games played
SC	Won Stanley Cup
Ret	Jersey number retired
HHOF	Elected to the Hockey Hall of Fame

Goaltenders
W	Wins	SO	Shutouts
L	Losses	GAA	Goals against average
T/OTL	Ties and Overtime Losses	SV%	Save percentage

Skaters
Pos	Position	RW	Right wing	A	Assists
D	Defenceman	C	Centre	P	Points
LW	Left wing	G	Goals	PIM	Penalty minutes

This list does not include data from the Quebec Nordiques. The seasons column lists the first year of the season of the player's first game and the last year of the season of the player's last game. For example, a player who played one game in the 2000–01 season would be listed as playing with the team from 2000–01, regardless of what calendar year the game occurred within.

Statistics are complete to the end of the 2025–26 NHL season.

== Goaltenders ==
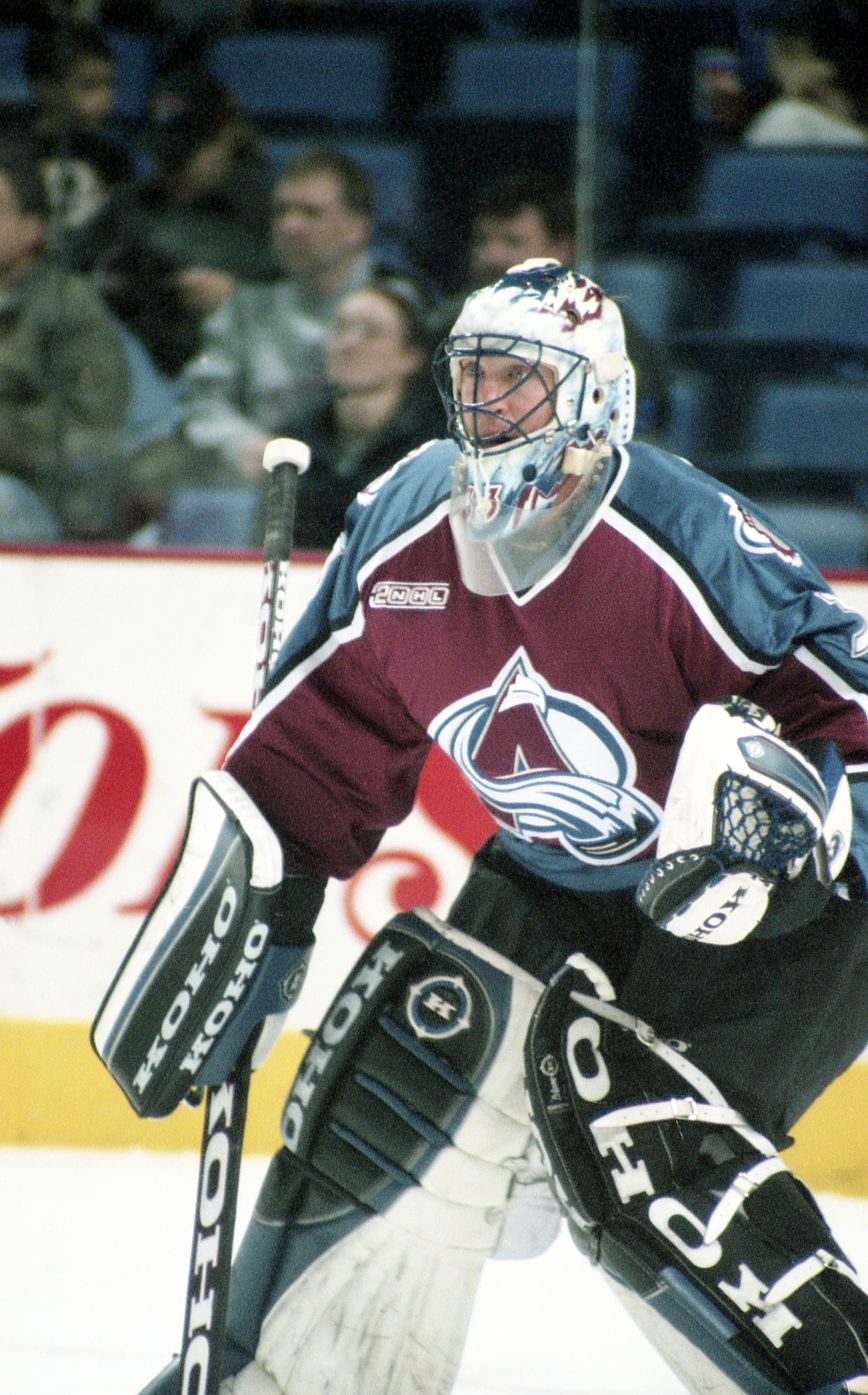
Patrick Roy, goalie for the Avalanche between 1995 and 2003, won two Stanley Cups with the team.

Name	Nat	Seasons	GP	W	L	T/OT	SO	GAA	SV%	GP	W	L	SO	GAA	SV%	Notes
Name	Nat	Seasons	Regular-season							Playoffs						Notes
Aebischer, David	(Switzerland)	2000–2006	174	89	58	14	13	2.35	.915	13	6	5	1	2.07	.922	SC 2001
Aittokallio, Sami	(Finland)	2012–2014	2	0	1	0	0	3.36	.884	—	—	—	—	—	—	
Anderson, Craig	(United States)	2009–2011	104	51	40	10	7	2.83	.911	6	2	4	1	2.62	.933	
Annunen, Justus	(Finland)	2021–2025	29	16	9	2	2	2.81	.902	—	—	—	—	—	—	
Bernier, Jonathan	(Canada)	2017–2018	37	19	13	3	2	2.85	.913	4	1	3	0	3.87	.863	
Berra, Reto	(Switzerland)	2013–2016	35	10	13	2	3	2.69	.915	—	—	—	—	—	—	
Bibeau, Antoine	(Canada)	2019–2020	2	1	0	0	0	3.27	.881	—	—	—	—	—	—	
Billington, Craig	(Canada)	1996–1999	67	30	23	7	2	2.61	.910	3	0	0	0	4.00	.895	
Blackwood, Mackenzie	(Canada)	2024–2026	76	45	22	5	6	2.42	.908	11	4	5	1	2.74	.892	
Budaj, Peter	(Slovakia)	2005–2011	242	101	91	27	9	2.83	.902	4	0	0	0	3.61	.899	
Denis, Marc	(Canada)	1996–2000	28	10	10	4	3	2.55	.916	—	—	—	—	—	—	
Dubnyk, Devan	(Canada)	2020–2021	5	3	2	0	0	3.26	.886	—	—	—	—	—	—	
Elliott, Brian	(Canada)	2010–2011	12	2	8	1	0	3.83	.891	—	—	—	—	—	—	
Fiset, Stephane	(Canada)	1995–1996	37	22	6	7	1	2.93	.898	1	0	0	0	0.00	1.000	SC 1996
Francouz, Pavel	(Czech Republic)	2018–2023	73	44	21	6	4	2.49	.919	13	8	4	2	3.01	.899	SC 2022
Georgiev, Alexandar	(Russia)	2022–2025	143	86	41	11	7	2.84	.905	18	9	9	0	2.76	.902	
Giguere, Jean-Sebastien	(Canada)	2011–2014	72	31	21	8	4	2.51	.914	—	—	—	—	—	—	
Grubauer, Philipp	(Germany)	2018–2021	113	66	30	10	12	2.38	.918	29	18	10	2	2.31	.920	
Hammond, Andrew	(Canada)	2017–2018	1	0	1	0	0	2.07	.939	3	1	1	0	2.63	.933	
Hutchinson, Michael	(Canada)	2019–2020	1	1	0	0	0	1.00	.944	4	2	1	0	2.75	.910	
Johansson, Jonas	(Sweden)	2020–2023	20	10	3	2	1	2.78	.901	—	—	—	—	—	—	
Kahkonen, Kaapo	(Finland)	2024–2025	1	0	1	0	0	4.12	.800	—	—	—	—	—	—	
Kinkaid, Keith	(United States)	2022–2023	1	0	0	0	0	2.15	.889	—	—	—	—	—	—	
Kolesnik, Vitali	(Kazakhstan)	2005–2006	8	3	3	0	0	3.24	.888	—	—	—	—	—	—	
Kuemper, Darcy	(Canada)	2021–2022	57	37	12	4	5	2.54	.921	16	10	4	1	2.57	.902	SC 2022
Martin, Spencer	(Canada)	2016–2017	3	0	2	1	0	4.35	.865	—	—	—	—	—	—	
Miner, Trent	(Canada)	2024–2026	6	1	1	3	1	2.19	.912	—	—	—	—	—	—	
Miska, Hunter	(United States)	2020–2021	5	1	1	2	0	4.16	.838	—	—	—	—	—	—	
Pickard, Calvin	(Canada)	2014–2017	86	28	44	6	3	2.77	.914	—	—	—	—	—	—	
Prosvetov, Ivan	(Russia)	2023–2024	11	4	3	1	0	3.16	.895	—	—	—	—	—	—	
Raycroft, Andrew	(Canada)	2008–2009	31	12	16	0	0	3.14	.892	—	—	—	—	—	—	
Roy, Patrick	(Canada)	1995–2003	478	262	140	65	37	2.27	.918	133	81	52	18	2.18	.922	SC 1996, 2001; HHOF 2006; Ret #33
Salo, Tommy	(Sweden)	2003–2004	5	1	3	1	0	2.37	.912	1	0	0	0	0.00	1.000	
Sauve, Philippe	(United States)	2003–2004	17	7	7	3	0	3.04	.896	—	—	—	—	—	—	
Smith, Jeremy	(United States)	2016–2017	10	1	6	1	0	3.54	.888	—	—	—	—	—	—	
Tabaracci, Rick	(Canada)	1999–2000	2	1	0	0	0	2.00	.889	—	—	—	—	—	—	
Theodore, Jose	(Canada)	2005–2008	91	42	39	5	3	2.76	.902	19	8	11	0	3.09	.904	
Thibault, Jocelyn	(Canada)	1995–1996	10	3	4	2	0	3.01	.874	—	—	—	—	—	—	
Varlamov, Semyon	(Russia)	2011–2019	389	183	156	38	21	2.72	.915	7	3	4	0	2.78	.913	
Wedgewood, Scott	(Canada)	2024–2026	64	44	10	7	6	2.02	.920	12	7	4	0	2.40	.907	
Weiman, Tyler	(Canada)	2007–2008	1	0	0	0	0	0.0	1.000	—	—	—	—	—	—	
Werner, Adam	(Sweden)	2019–2020	2	1	1	0	0	3.42	.914	—	—	—	—	—	—	

== Skaters ==
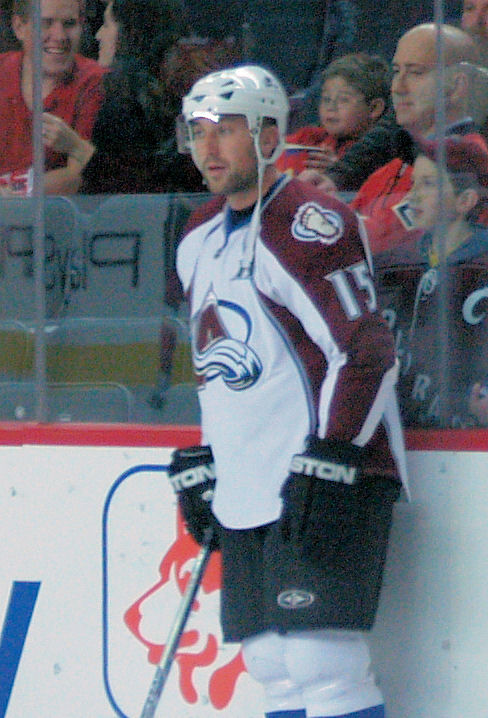
Andrew Brunette played with the Avalanche from 2005 to 2008.

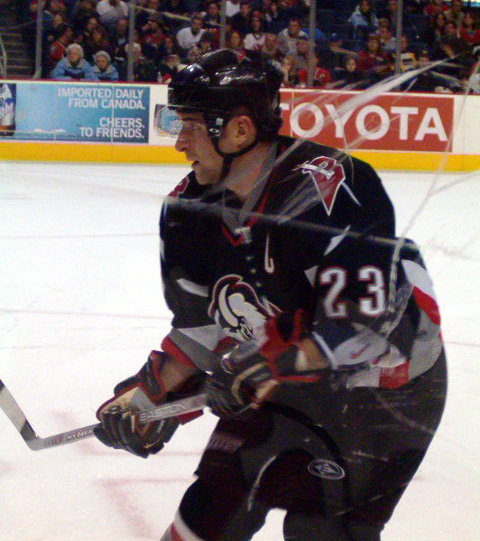
Chris Drury, here seen playing for the Buffalo Sabres, was part of the 2001 Stanley Cup-winning roster and played in nearly 400 games with the Avalanche.

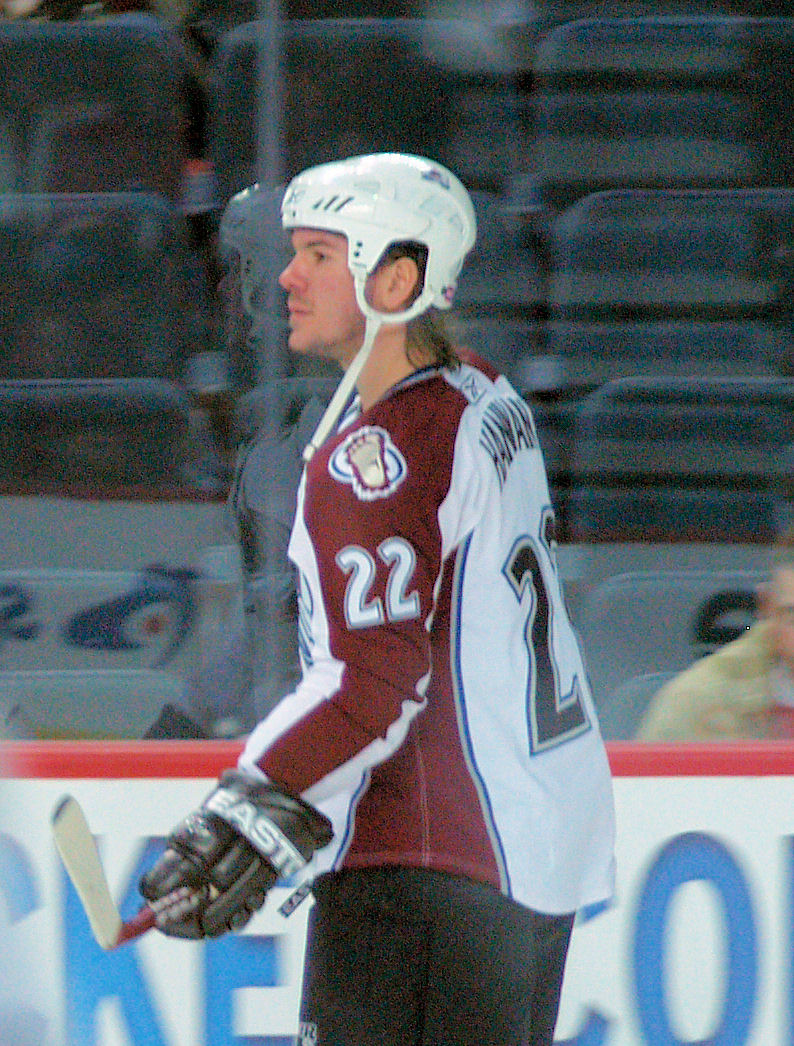
Scott Hannan signed as a free agent in July 2007.

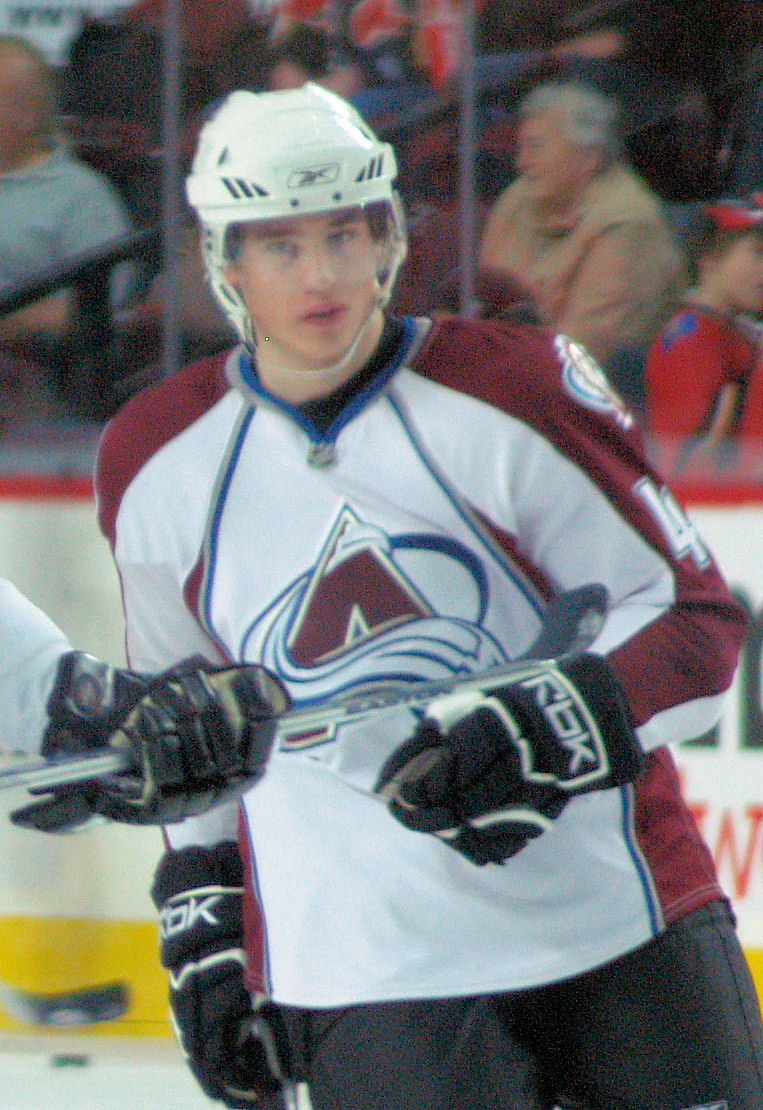
Kyle Cumiskey was drafted in 2005 and debuted with the Avalanche in the 2006–07 season.

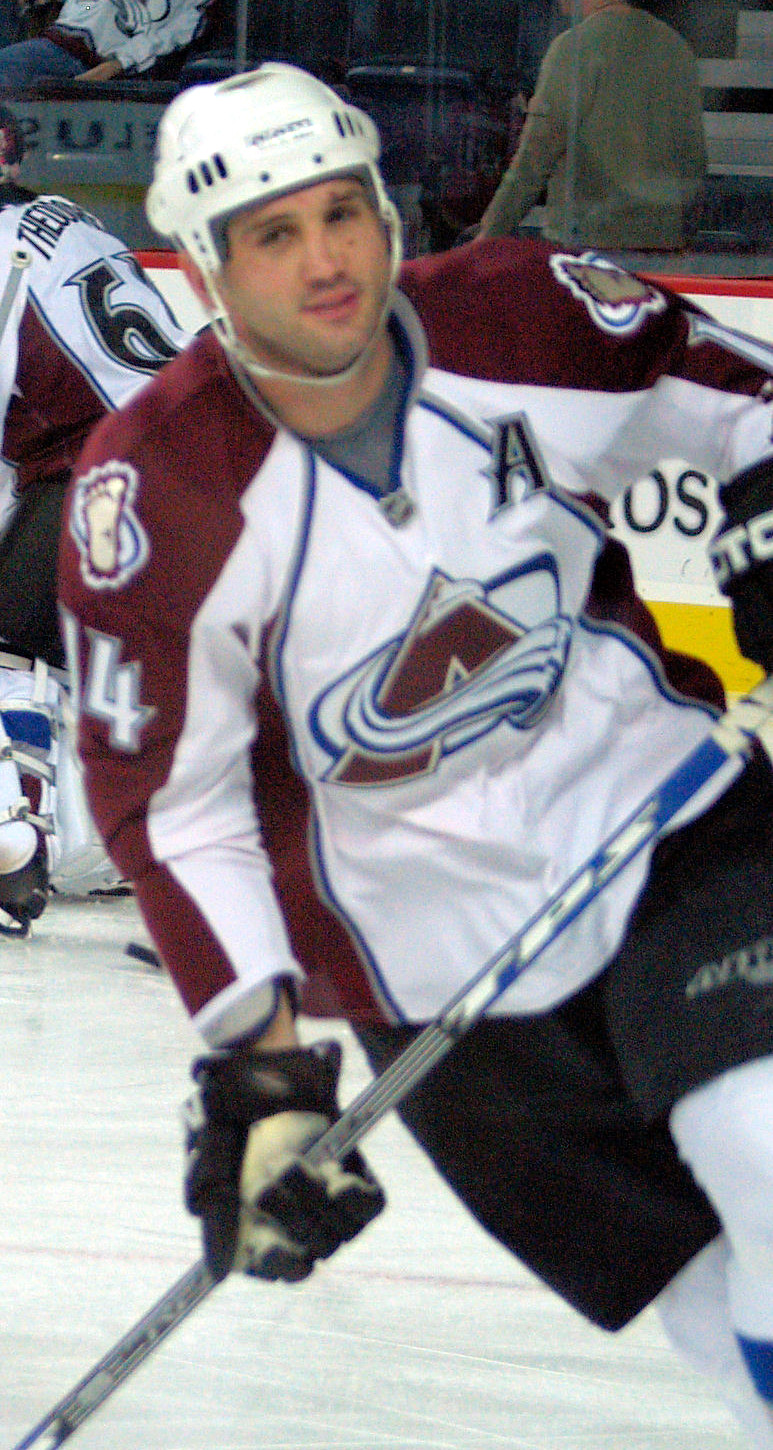
Ian Laperriere was with the Avalanche from the '05/'06 - '08-'09 seasons.

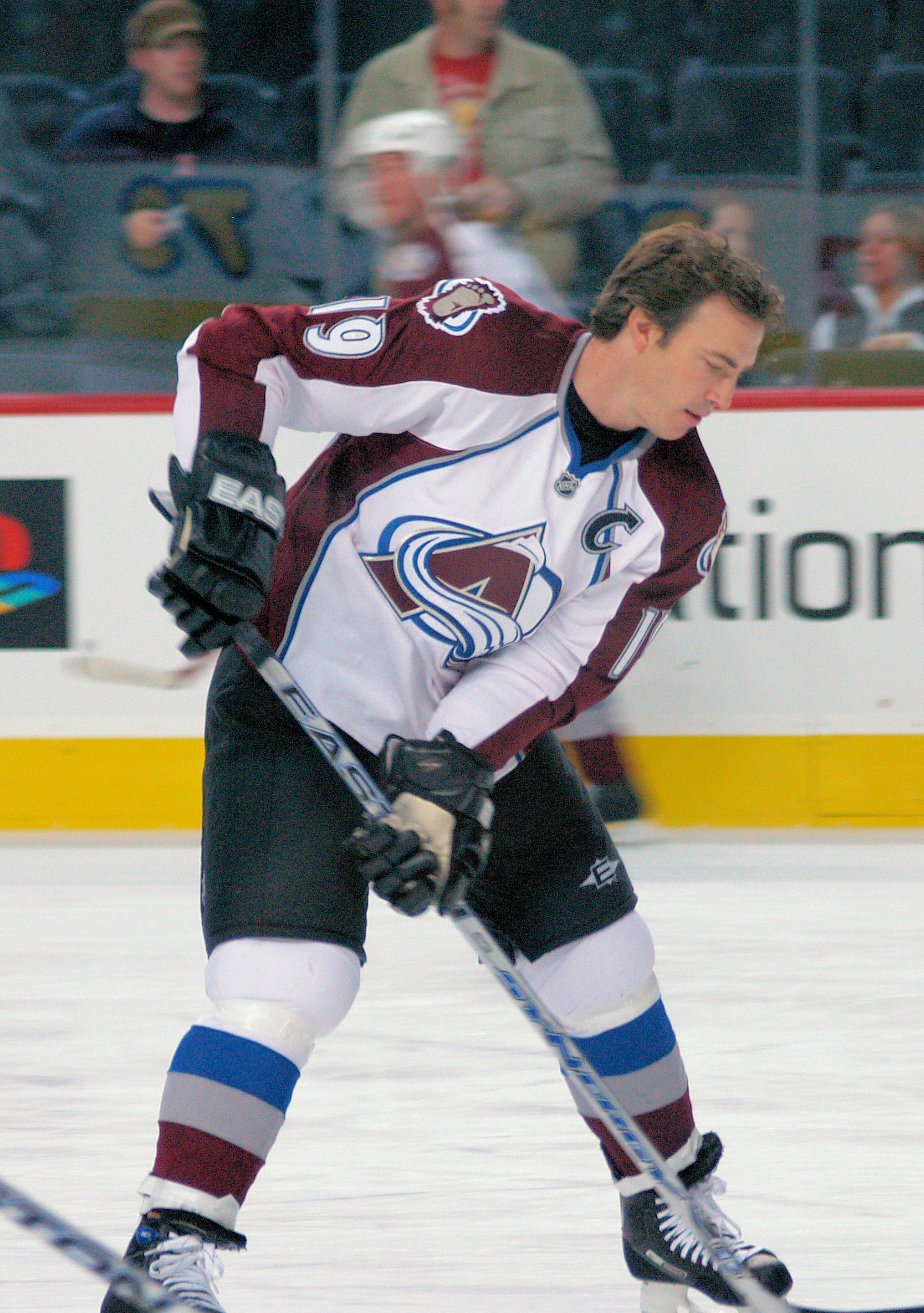
Joe Sakic has played his entire career in the Nordiques/Avalanche organization and was the first captain of the Avalanche. He has played over 1000 games with the team, winning two Stanley Cups and several individual trophies.

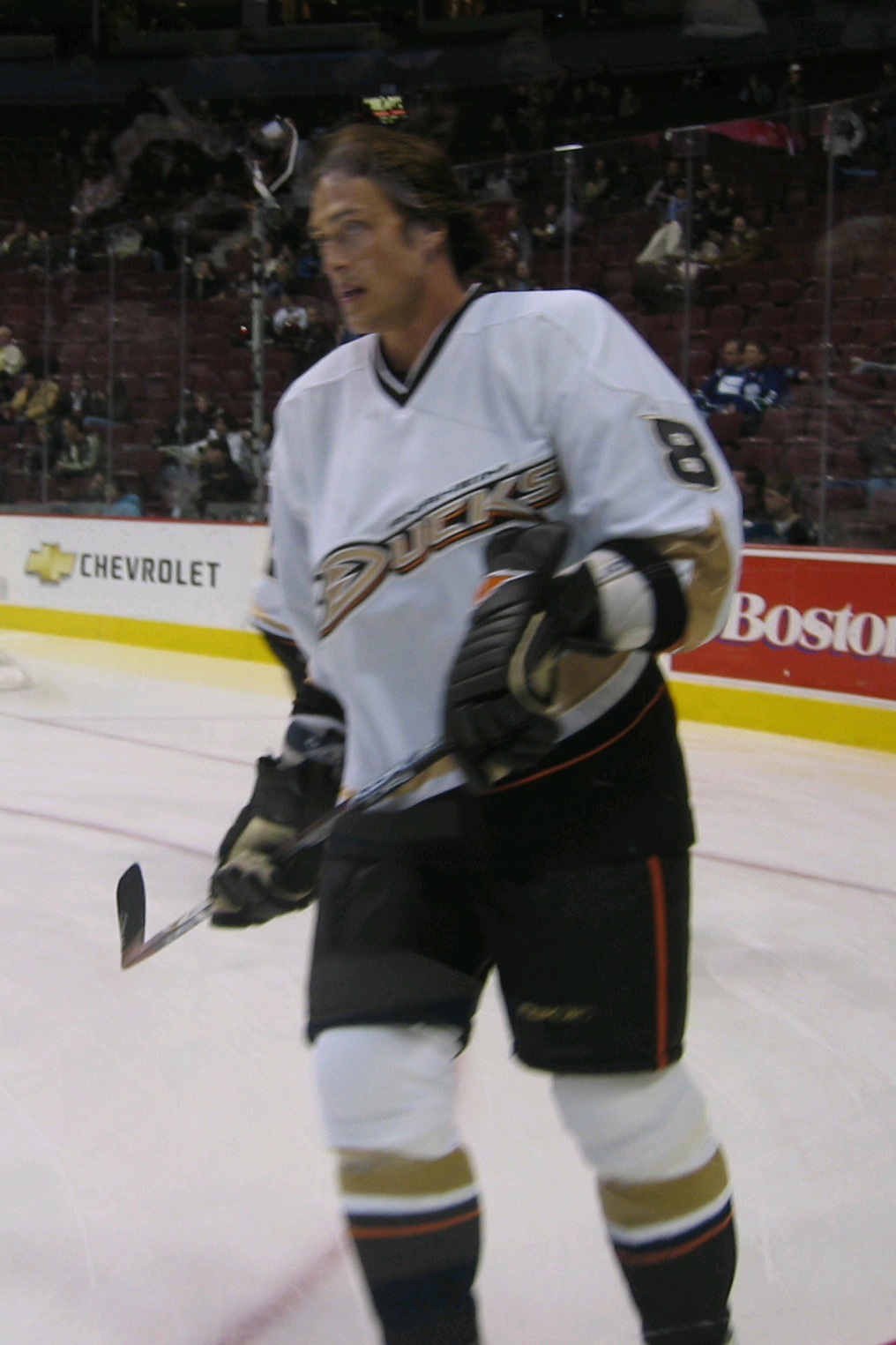
Teemu Selanne, here seen playing for the Anaheim Ducks, signed with the Avalanche in 2003 and played in Colorado for one season.

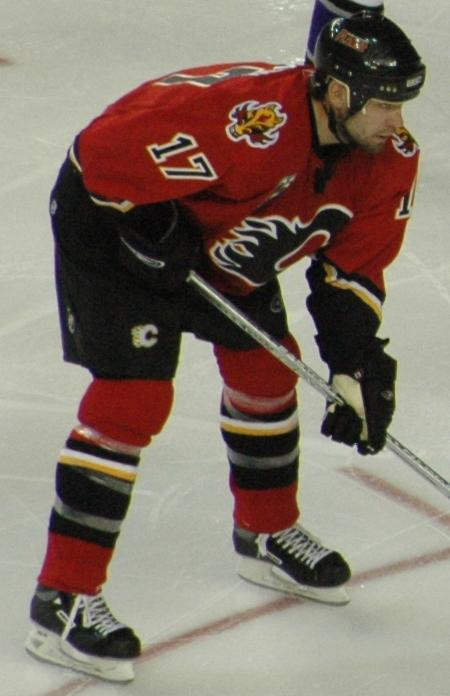
Chris Simon, here seen playing for the Calgary Flames, was part of the 1996 Stanley Cup-winning roster.

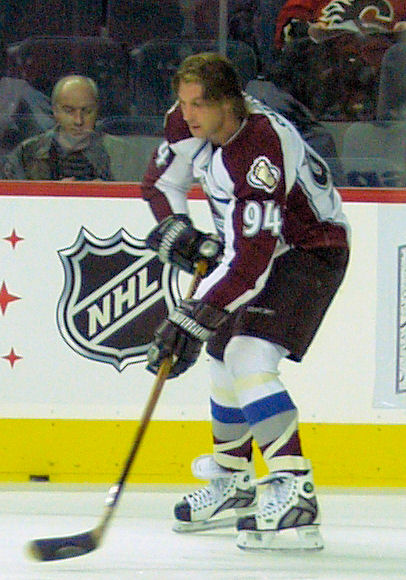
Ryan Smyth signed as a free agent in July 2007.

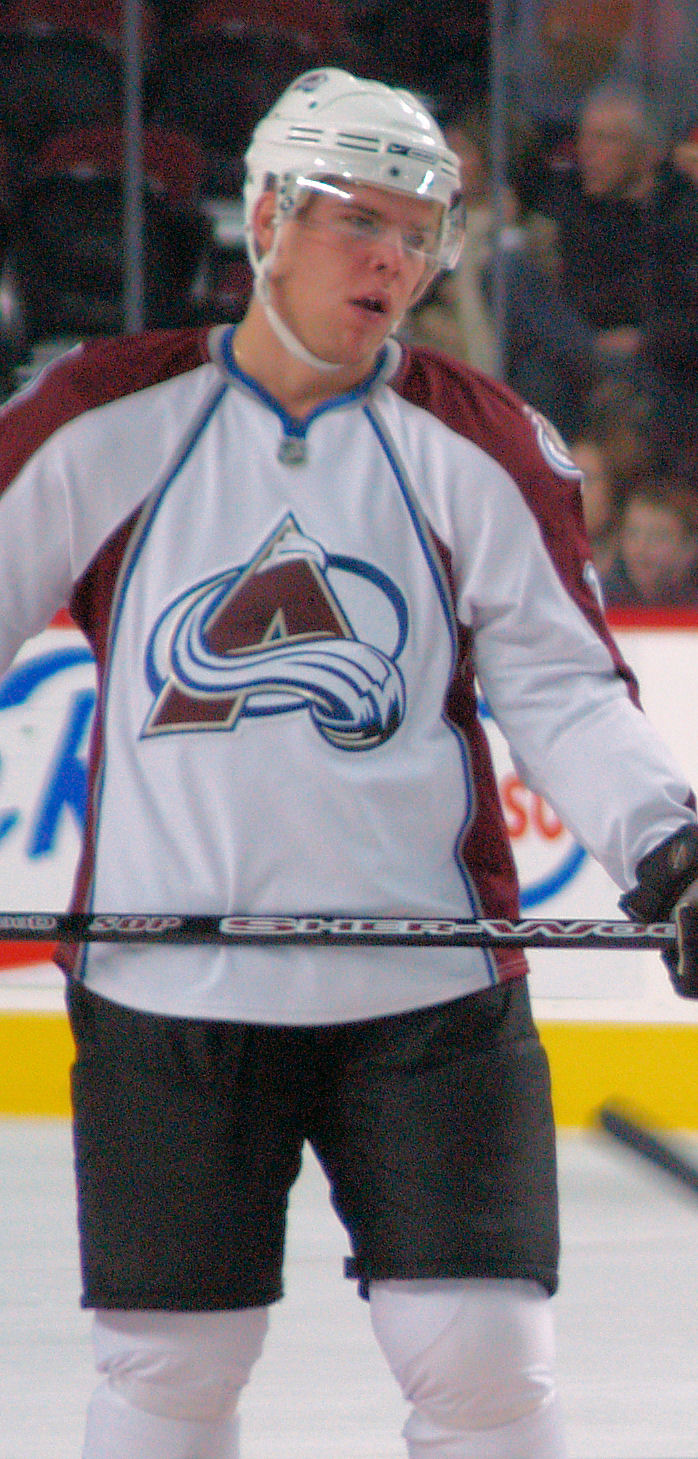
Paul Stastny was drafted in 2005 by the Avalanche and played his first season in the NHL in 2006–07, when he was one of three finalists for the Calder Memorial Trophy, which is awarded to the best rookie.

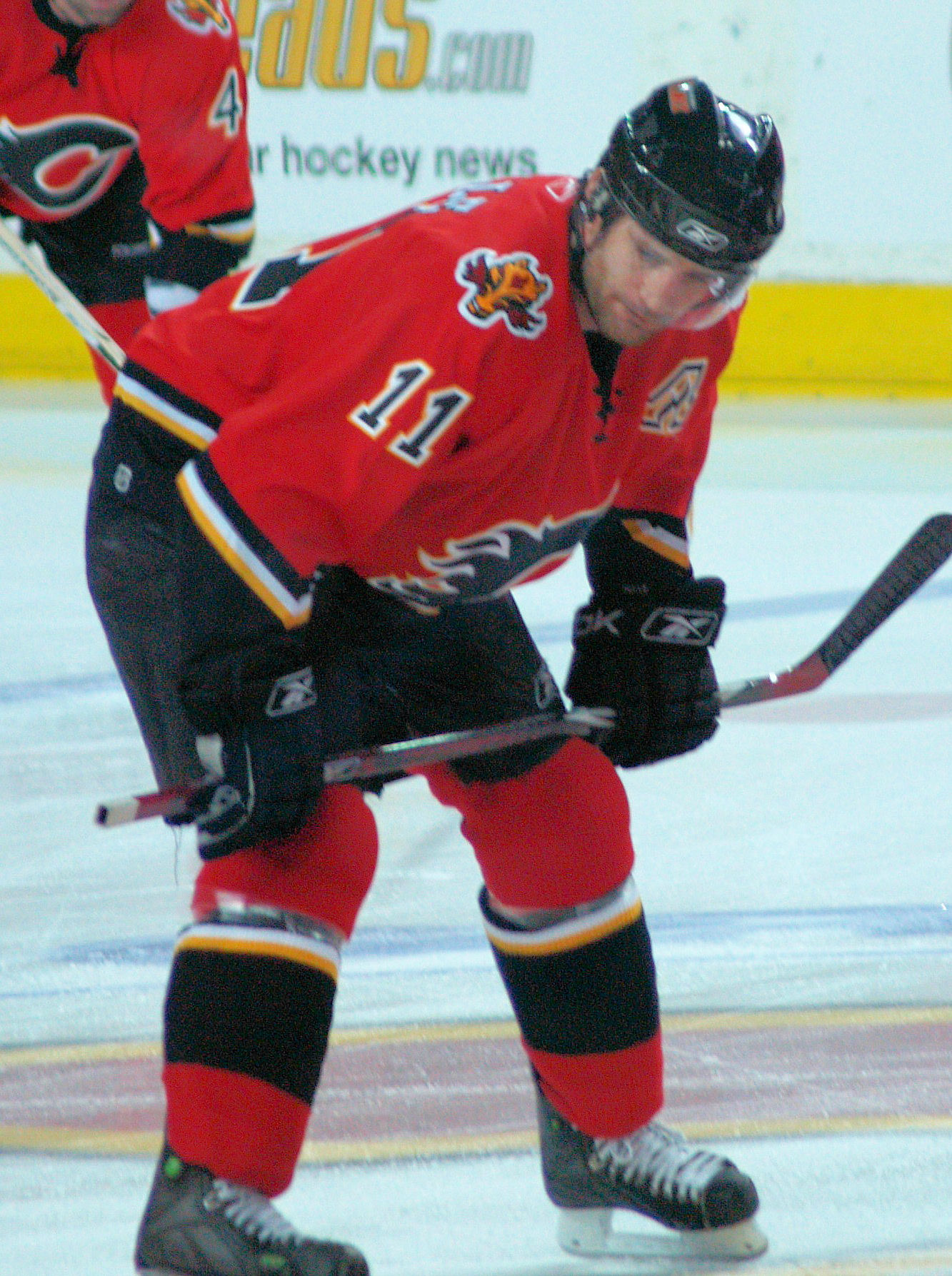
Stephane Yelle, here seen playing for the Calgary Flames, was part of both Avalanche Stanley Cup winning rosters and played more than 600 games for the team.

Name	Nat	Pos	Seasons	GP	G	A	P	PIM	GP	G	A	P	PIM	Notes
Name	Nat	Pos	Seasons	Regular-season					Playoffs					Notes
Aamodt, Wyatt	(United States)	D	2024–2025	2	1	0	1	0	—	—	—	—	—	
Agozzino, Andrew	(Canada)	LW	2014–2016; 2018–2019	21	1	4	5	0	—	—	—	—	—	
Ahcan, Jack	(United States)	D	2024–2026	13	0	2	2	4	3	0	0	0	0	
Alt, Mark	(United States)	D	2017–2019	9	0	0	0	0	—	—	—	—	—	
Andreychuk, Dave	(Canada)	LW	1999–2000	14	1	2	3	2	17	3	2	5	18	HHOF 2017
Andrighetto, Sven	(Switzerland)	RW	2016–2019	133	20	35	55	32	11	1	0	1	8	
Arnason, Tyler	(United States)	C	2006–2009	223	31	71	102	56	10	2	3	5	2	
Aube-Kubel, Nicolas	(Canada)	RW	2021–2022	67	11	11	22	41	14	0	0	0	4	SC 2022
Aubin, Serge	(Canada)	C	1998–2000; 2002–2003	82	6	7	13	70	22	0	1	1	10	
Babenko, Yuri	(Russia)	C	2000–2001	3	0	0	0	0	—	—	—	—	—	
Barberio, Mark	(Canada)	D	2016–2020	113	6	19	25	55	6	0	1	1	6	
Bardakov, Zakhar	(Russia)	C	2025–2026	60	1	9	10	14	—	—	—	—	—	
Barnaby, Matthew	(Canada)	RW	2003–2004	13	4	5	9	37	11	0	2	2	27	
Barre-Boulet, Alex	(Canada)	F	2025–2026	2	0	1	1	0	—	—	—	—	—	
Barrie, Tyson	(Canada)	D	2011–2019	484	75	232	307	163	21	1	13	14	6	
Barron, Justin	(Canada)	D	2021–2022	2	0	0	0	0	—	—	—	—	—	
Battaglia, Bates	(United States)	LW	2002–2004	17	1	6	7	14	7	0	2	2	4	
Beauchemin, Francois	(Canada)	D	2015–2017	163	13	39	52	70	—	—	—	—	—	
Belak, Wade	(Canada)	D	1996–1999	35	1	1	2	109	—	—	—	—	—	
Belle, Shawn	(Canada)	D	2010–2011	4	0	0	0	2	—	—	—	—	—	
Bellemare, Pierre-Edouard	(France)	C	2019–2021	122	18	15	33	38	25	2	4	6	6	
Benoit, Andre	(Canada)	D	2013–2014	79	7	21	28	26	7	0	1	1	6	
Berry, Rick	(Canada)	D	2000–2002	76	0	4	4	98	—	—	—	—	—	
Bigras, Chris	(Canada)	D	2015–2018	46	1	3	4	18	—	—	—	—	—	
Blake, Rob	(Canada)	D	2000–2006	322	62	146	208	278	68	16	27	43	54	SC 2001; HHOF 2014
Blankenburg, Nick	(United States)	D	2025–2026	12	2	1	3	0	5	1	0	1	2	
Blidh, Anton	(Sweden)	LW	2022–2023	14	0	0	0	4	—	—	—	—	—	
Bodnarchuk, Andrew	(Canada)	RW	2015–2016	21	0	2	2	6	—	—	—	—	—	
Boedker, Mikkel	(Denmark)	LW	2015–2016	18	4	8	12	2	—	—	—	—	—	
Bonvie, Dennis	(Canada)	RW	2003–2004	1	0	0	0	0	—	—	—	—	—	
Bordeleau, Patrick	(Canada)	LW	2012–2015	129	8	8	16	185	7	0	0	0	10	
Boughner, Bob	(Canada)	D	2003–2006	52	1	6	7	62	11	0	4	4	6	
Bourque, Gabriel	(Canada)	LW	2016–2019	119	7	12	19	22	18	3	0	3	2	
Bourque, Ray	(Canada)	D	1999–2001	94	15	58	73	54	34	5	14	19	20	SC 2001; HHOF 2004; Ret #77
Bourque, Rene	(Canada)	RW	2016–2017	65	12	6	18	56	—	—	—	—	—	
Bowers, Shane	(Canada)	C	2022–2023	1	0	0	0	0	—	—	—	—	—	
Boychuk, Johnny	(Canada)	D	2007–2008	4	0	0	0	0	—	—	—	—	—	
Bradley, Chase	(United States)	LW	2024–2025	2	0	0	0	0	—	—	—	—	—	
Brassard, Derick	(Canada)	C	2018–2019	20	4	0	4	8	9	0	1	1	8	
Brennan, Rich	(United States)	D	1996–1997	2	0	0	0	0	—	—	—	—	—	
Briere, Daniel	(Canada)	C	2014–2015	57	8	4	12	18	—	—	—	—	—	
Brigley, Travis	(Canada)	LW	2003–2004	36	3	4	7	10	—	—	—	—	—	
Brindley, Gavin	(United States)	C	2025–2026	56	6	7	13	8	—	—	—	—	—	
Brisebois, Patrice	(Canada)	D	2005–2007	113	11	38	49	77	9	0	1	1	4	
Brophey, Evan	(Canada)	LW	2011–2012	3	0	0	0	0	—	—	—	—	—	
Brousseau, Paul	(Canada)	RW	1995–1996	8	1	1	2	2	—	—	—	—	—	
Brule, Steve	(Canada)	RW	2002–2003	2	0	0	0	0	—	—	—	—	—	
Brunette, Andrew	(Canada)	LW	2005–2008	246	70	135	205	98	19	8	9	17	10	
Buchanan, Jeff	(Canada)	D	1998–1999	6	0	0	0	6	—	—	—	—	—	
Burakovsky, Andre	(Sweden)	LW	2019–2022	191	61	89	150	50	37	11	18	29	10	SC 2022
Burke, Callahan	(United States)	C	2022–2023	2	0	0	0	0	—	—	—	—	—	
Burns, Brent	(Canada)	D	2025–2026	82	12	23	35	32	13	0	4	4	6	
Burroughs, Kyle	(Canada)	D	2020–2021	5	0	1	1	5	—	—	—	—	—	
Byram, Bowen	(Canada)	D	2020–2024	146	23	40	63	113	27	0	12	12	10	SC 2022
Calvert, Matt	(Canada)	LW	2018–2021	150	23	31	54	103	16	1	6	7	22	
Carey, Paul	(United States)	C	2013–2015	22	0	1	1	0	3	0	0	0	0	
Caron, Jordan	(Canada)	RW	2014–2015	19	0	0	0	2	—	—	—	—	—	
Clark, Brett	(Canada)	D	2003–2010	371	30	100	130	205	10	2	2	4	2	
Cliche, Marc-Andre	(Canada)	C	2013–2015	150	3	11	14	34	7	0	0	0	2	
Cogliano, Andrew	(Canada)	LW	2021–2024	172	16	23	39	68	31	3	8	11	18	SC 2022
Cohen, Colby	(United States)	D	2010–2011	3	0	0	0	4	—	—	—	—	—	
Colborne, Joe	(Canada)	C	2016–2017	62	4	4	8	34	—	—	—	—	—	
Cole, Ian	(United States)	D	2018–2021	138	6	35	41	151	27	0	7	7	26	
Colton, Ross	(United States)	C	2023–2026	214	42	51	93	92	23	3	6	9	18	
Comeau, Blake	(Canada)	RW	2015–2018	237	33	57	90	166	6	2	0	2	2	
Compher, J. T.	(United States)	C	2016–2023	423	88	106	194	150	70	14	15	29	20	SC 2022
Connauton, Kevin	(Canada)	D	2019–2020	4	0	0	0	0	4	0	1	1	6	
Connolly, Mike	(Canada)	LW	2011–2012	2	0	0	0	2	—	—	—	—	—	
Corbet, Rene	(Canada)	LW	1995–1999	230	39	47	86	291	27	5	4	9	31	SC 1996
Coyle, Charlie	(United States)	C	2024–2025	19	2	11	13	6	7	1	0	1	2	
Crowley, Ted	(United States)	D	1998–1999	7	0	1	1	2	—	—	—	—	—	
Cumiskey, Kyle	(Canada)	D	2006–2011	135	9	26	35	48	6	1	1	2	2	
Cummins, Jim	(United States)	RW	2003–2004	55	1	2	3	47	—	—	—	—	—	
Dano, Marko	(Slovakia)	C	2018–2019	8	0	0	0	7	—	—	—	—	—	
Daw, Jeff	(Canada)	C	2001–2002	1	0	1	1	0	—	—	—	—	—	
Deadmarsh, Adam	(Canada)	RW	1995–2001	405	129	142	271	667	82	22	33	55	94	SC 1996
de Haan, Calvin	(Canada)	D	2024–2025	44	0	7	7	10	—	—	—	—	—	
de Vries, Greg	(Canada)	D	1998–2003	379	22	60	82	311	75	6	12	18	48	SC 2001
Dingman, Chris	(Canada)	LW	1998–2001	110	9	4	13	247	16	0	4	4	14	SC 2001
Donovan, Shean	(Canada)	RW	1997–2000	133	13	19	32	93	5	0	0	0	2	
Donskoi, Joonas	(Finland)	RW	2019–2021	116	33	31	64	36	19	6	5	11	2	
Dowd, Jim	(United States)	C	2005–2006	18	2	1	3	2	9	2	3	5	20	
Downie, Steve	(Canada)	RW	2011–2013	33	3	18	21	58	—	—	—	—	—	
Dries, Sheldon	(United States)	C	2018–2021	48	3	3	6	30	1	0	0	0	0	
Drouin, Jonathan	(Canada)	LW	2023–2025	122	30	63	93	34	10	0	6	6	2	
Drury, Chris	(United States)	LW	1998–2002	314	85	137	222	189	80	26	24	50	26	SC 2001
Drury, Jack	(United States)	C	2024–2026	115	15	21	36	41	20	4	3	7	8	
Duchene, Matt	(Canada)	C	2009–2018	586	178	250	428	144	8	0	6	6	2	
Duhaime, Brandon	(United States)	RW	2023–2024	18	1	4	5	4	11	1	0	1	8	
Dupuis, Philippe	(Canada)	C	2008–2011	86	6	12	18	46	—	—	—	—	—	
Durno, Chris	(Canada)	LW	2008–2010	43	4	4	8	47	1	0	0	0	0	
Eller, Lars	(Denmark)	C	2022–2023	24	3	4	7	10	7	0	0	0	0	
Elliott, Stefan	(Canada)	D	2011–2015	63	6	12	18	12	—	—	—	—	—	
Englund, Andreas	(Sweden)	D	2022–2023	36	0	3	3	26	—	—	—	—	—	
Everberg, Dennis	(Sweden)	LW	2014–2016	70	3	9	12	10	—	—	—	—	—	
Fairchild, Kelly	(United States)	C	2001–2002	10	2	0	2	2	—	—	—	—	—	
Felhaber, Tye	(Canada)	LW	2024–2025	5	0	0	0	0	—	—	—	—	—	
Finger, Jeff	(United States)	D	2006–2008	94	9	15	24	51	5	0	2	2	4	
Fitzgerald, Tom	(United States)	RW	1997–1998	11	2	1	3	22	7	0	1	1	20	
Fleischmann, Tomas	(Czech Republic)	L	2010–2011	22	8	13	21	8	—	—	—	—	—	
Fleury, Theo	(Canada)	RW	1998–1999	15	10	14	24	18	18	5	12	17	17	
Foote, Adam	(Canada)	D	1995–2004; 2007–2011	760	48	173	221	948	158	7	33	40	282	SC 1996, 2001; Ret #52
Forsberg, Peter	(Sweden)	C	1995–2004; 2007–2008; 2010–2011	544	202	503	705	540	134	56	97	153	141	SC 1996, 2001; HHOF 2014; Ret #21
Foudy, Jean-Luc	(Canada)	C	2022–2025	13	1	0	1	6	—	—	—	—	—	
Galchenyuk, Alex	(United States)	C	2022–2023	11	0	0	0	4	—	—	—	—	—	
Galiardi, TJ	(Canada)	C	2008–2012	171	33	39	72	93	6	0	2	2	6	
Gaul, Mike	(Canada)	D	1998–1999	1	0	0	0	0	—	—	—	—	—	
Gaunce, Cameron	(Canada)	D	2010–2011	11	1	0	1	16	—	—	—	—	—	
Gelinas, Eric	(Canada)	D	2015–2017	33	0	1	1	12	—	—	—	—	—	
Gilbert, Dennis	(United States)	D	2020–2021	3	0	0	0	5	—	—	—	—	—	
Gill, Todd	(Canada)	D	2001–2002	36	0	4	4	25	—	—	—	—	—	
Girard, Samuel	(Canada)	D	2017–2026	583	36	196	232	120	67	3	25	28	10	SC 2022
Goloubef, Cody	(Canada)	D	2016–2017	33	0	5	5	25	—	—	—	—	—	
Gormley, Brandon	(Canada)	D	2015–2016	26	0	1	1	8	—	—	—	—	—	
Gratton, Chris	(Canada)	C	2003–2004	13	2	1	3	18	11	0	0	0	27	
Graves, Ryan	(Canada)	D	2018–2021	149	14	32	46	102	25	2	7	9	16	
Greer, A. J.	(Canada)	LW	2016–2019	37	1	5	6	47	—	—	—	—	—	
Grigorenko, Mikhail	(Russia)	C	2015–2017	149	16	34	50	26	—	—	—	—	—	
Grimaldi, Rocco	(United States)	C	2016–2018	10	1	3	4	2	—	—	—	—	—	
Gross, Jordan	(United States)	D	2021–2022	1	0	0	0	4	—	—	—	—	—	
Guenin, Nate	(United States)	D	2013–2016	173	3	21	24	80	7	0	1	1	4	
Guite, Ben	(Canada)	C	2006–2009	168	19	26	45	93	10	1	0	1	14	
Gusarov, Alexei	(Russia)	D	1995–2001	292	16	50	66	166	50	0	13	13	34	SC 1996
Hahl, Riku	(Finland)	C	2001–2004	92	5	8	13	38	34	2	4	6	4	
Hamilton, Freddie	(Canada)	C	2014–2015	17	1	0	1	0	—	—	—	—	—	
Hannan, Dave	(Canada)	LW	1995–1996	4	1	0	1	2	13	0	2	2	2	SC 1996
Hannan, Scott	(Canada)	D	2007–2011	267	5	48	53	127	15	0	1	1	8	
Haydar, Darren	(Canada)	RW	2009–2010	1	0	0	0	0	—	—	—	—	—	
Healey, Paul	(Canada)	W	2005–2006	2	0	0	0	14	—	—	—	—	—	
Hejda, Jan	(Czech Republic)	D	2011–2015	286	13	46	59	134	7	0	0	0	6	
Hejduk, Milan	(Czech Republic)	RW	1998–2013	1020	375	430	805	316	112	34	42	76	28	SC 2001
Helenius, Sami	(Finland)	D	1999–2000	33	0	0	0	46	—	—	—	—	—	
Helm, Darren	(Canada)	RW	2021–2023	79	7	8	15	18	21	2	3	5	12	SC 2022
Hendricks, Matt	(United States)	C	2008–2010	60	9	7	16	87	6	0	0	0	0	
Hendrickson, Darby	(United States)	C	2003–2004	20	1	3	4	6	6	1	0	1	2	
Henley, Samuel	(Canada)	C	2016–2017	1	1	0	1	2	—	—	—	—	—	
Hensick, T. J.	(United States)	C	2007–2010	99	11	24	35	16	2	0	1	1	0	
Hinote, Dan	(United States)	C	1999–2006	353	27	28	65	254	69	6	9	15	63	SC 2001
Hishon, Joey	(Canada)	C	2013–2015	13	1	1	2	0	3	0	1	1	2	
Hlinka, Jaroslav	(Czech Republic)	C	2007–2008	63	8	20	28	16	1	0	0	0	0	
Holden, Nick	(Canada)	D	2013–2016	214	21	40	61	74	7	3	1	4	8	
Holos, Jonas	(Norway)	D	2010–2011	39	0	6	6	10	—	—	—	—	—	
Hudon, Charles	(Canada)	LW	2022–2023	9	0	0	0	2	—	—	—	—	—	
Hunt, Brad	(Canada)	D	2022–2023	47	4	6	10	12	1	0	0	0	0	
Hunt, Dryden	(Canada)	LW	2022–2023	25	1	0	1	13	—	—	—	—	—	
Hunter, Dale	(Canada)	C	1998–1999	12	2	4	6	17	19	1	3	4	38	
Hunwick, Matt	(United States)	D	2010–2014	128	3	19	22	40	—	—	—	—	—	
Iginla, Jarome	(Canada)	RW	2014–2017	225	59	65	124	137	—	—	—	—	—	HHOF 2020
Innala, Jere	(Finland)	LW	2024–2025	17	0	0	0	2	—	—	—	—	—	
Ivan, Ivan	(Czech Republic)	C	2024–2026	49	5	4	9	10	—	—	—	—	—	
Johansen, Ryan	(Canada)	C	2023–2024	63	13	10	23	34	—	—	—	—	—	
Johnson, Erik	(United States)	D	2010–2023; 2024–2025	731	69	179	248	374	57	5	8	13	10	SC 2022
Johnson, Jack	(United States)	D	2021–2024	179	6	23	29	92	27	0	0	0	14	SC 2022
Jones, Caleb	(United States)	D	2023–2024	25	0	5	5	8	3	0	0	0	6	
Jones, David	(Canada)	RW	2007–2013	272	70	56	126	84	10	0	1	1	6	
Jones, Keith	(Canada)	RW	1996–1999	102	28	29	57	147	13	3	3	6	17	
Jost, Tyson	(Canada)	C	2016–2022	321	45	58	103	116	40	6	4	10	12	
Kadri, Nazem	(Canada)	C	2019–2022; 2025–2026	194	62	102	164	208	46	19	24	43	32	SC 2022
Kamenev, Vladislav	(Russia)	LW	2017–2020	64	3	10	13	18	—	—	—	—	—	
Kamensky, Valeri	(Russia)	LW	1995–1999	289	106	155	261	211	56	24	34	58	66	SC 1996
Kariya, Paul	(Canada)	LW	2003–2004	51	11	25	36	22	1	0	1	1	0	HHOF 2017
Kasparaitis, Darius	(Lithuania)	D	2001–2002	11	0	0	0	19	21	0	3	3	18	
Kaut, Martin	(Czech Republic)	RW	2019–2023	47	3	3	6	10	—	—	—	—	—	
Keane, Mike	(Canada)	RW	1995–1997; 2001–2003	223	27	37	64	153	63	7	7	14	50	SC 1996
Kelly, Parker	(Canada)	C	2024–2026	162	29	25	54	59	20	2	3	5	26	
Kerfoot, Alexander	(Canada)	C	2017–2019	157	34	51	85	66	18	2	3	5	8	
Kiviranta, Joel	(Finland)	F	2023–2026	186	22	19	41	40	20	1	1	2	6	
Klee, Ken	(United States)	D	2006–2007	81	3	16	19	68	—	—	—	—	—	
Klemm, Jon	(Canada)	D	1995–2001	393	28	55	83	206	94	6	6	12	41	SC 1996, 2001
Kobasew, Chuck	(United States)	RW	2011–2013	95	12	11	23	72	—	—	—	—	—	
Koci, David	(Czech Republic)	D	2009–2011	78	2	0	2	164	—	—	—	—	—	
Konowalchuk, Steve	(United States)	LW	2003–2006	97	25	29	54	84	13	4	0	4	16	
Kovalenko, Andrei	(Russia)	RW	1995–1996	26	11	11	22	16	—	—	—	—	—	
Kovalenko, Nikolai	(Russia)	RW	2023–2025	28	4	4	8	10	2	0	0	0	0	
Krestanovich, Jordan	(Canada)	LW	2001–2004	22	0	2	2	6	—	—	—	—	—	
Krupp, Uwe	(Germany)	D	1995–1998	144	13	42	55	90	29	4	13	17	37	SC 1996
Kulak, Brett	(Canada)	D	2025–2026	27	0	3	3	10	13	1	4	5	6	
Kuleshov, Mikhail	(Russia)	LW	2003–2004	3	0	0	0	0	—	—	—	—	—	
Kurri, Jari	(Finland)	RW	1997–1998	70	5	17	22	12	4	0	0	0	0	HHOF 2001
Kylington, Oliver	(Sweden)	D	2024–2025	13	1	3	4	4	—	—	—	—	—	
Laaksonen, Antti	(Finland)	LW	2005–2007	122	19	19	38	56	9	0	2	2	2	
Lacroix, Eric	(Canada)	LW	1996–1999	170	34	33	67	110	24	1	4	5	25	
Landeskog, Gabriel	(Sweden)	LW	2011–2026	798	262	344	606	648	87	34	48	82	67	SC 2022
Laperriere, Ian	(Canada)	C	2005–2009	307	40	72	112	552	19	1	2	3	46	
Lapointe, Claude	(Canada)	C	1995–1996	3	0	0	0	0	—	—	—	—	—	
Larsen, Brad	(Canada)	LW	1997–2004	92	4	12	16	60	21	1	1	2	13	
Laukkanen, Janne	(Finland)	D	1995–1996	3	1	0	1	0	—	—	—	—	—	
Ledin, Per	(Sweden)	LW	2008–2009	3	0	0	0	2	—	—	—	—	—	
Lefebvre, Sylvain	(Canada)	D	1995–1999	303	9	50	59	175	65	0	6	6	53	SC 1996
Lehkonen, Artturi	(Finland)	LW	2021–2026	264	91	96	187	100	56	23	18	41	36	SC 2022
Lemieux, Claude	(Canada)	RW	1995–2000	297	106	106	212	381	62	24	31	55	121	SC 1996
Leopold, Jordan	(United States)	D	2006–2009	122	13	25	38	52	7	0	3	3	0	
Leroux, Francois	(Canada)	D	1997–1998	50	1	2	3	140	—	—	—	—	—	
Leschyshyn, Curtis	(Canada)	D	1995–1997	88	4	20	24	79	17	1	2	3	8	SC 1996
Liffiton, David	(Canada)	D	2010–2011	4	1	0	1	17	—	—	—	—	—	
Liles, John-Michael	(United States)	D	2003–2011	523	68	207	275	218	36	4	7	11	16	
Lindgren, Ryan	(United States)	D	2024–2025	18	2	1	3	4	7	0	3	3	8	
Lindholm, Anton	(Sweden)	D	2016–2020	66	0	5	5	16	—	—	—	—	—	
Lindstrom, Joakim	(Sweden)	LW	2011–2012	16	2	3	5	0	—	—	—	—	—	
Ludvig, John	(Canada)	D	2024–2025	8	0	2	2	6	—	—	—	—	—	
Macias, Ray	(United States)	D	2008–2011	8	0	1	1	2	—	—	—	—	—	
MacDermid, Kurtis	(Canada)	D	2021–2024	131	5	8	13	167	—	—	—	—	—	SC 2022
MacDonald, Jacob	(United States)	D	2020–2023	74	1	10	11	21	—	—	—	—	—	
MacKenzie, Aaron	(Canada)	D	2008–2009	5	0	0	0	0	—	—	—	—	—	
MacKinnon, Nathan	(Canada)	C	2013–2026	950	420	722	1142	428	108	62	78	140	48	SC 2022
Makar, Cale	(Canada)	D	2018–2026	470	136	371	507	134	90	26	64	90	24	SC 2022
Makar, Taylor	(Canada)	LW	2025–2026	12	0	0	0	4	—	—	—	—	—	
Malgin, Denis	(Switzerland)	C	2022–2023	42	11	6	17	4	7	0	0	0	2	
Malinski, Sam	(United States)	D	2023–2026	181	16	49	65	44	16	1	3	4	4	
Malone, Brad	(Canada)	LW	2011–2014	54	4	5	9	39	6	0	0	0	2	
Maltsev, Mikhail	(Russia)	C	2021–2023	23	0	0	0	2	—	—	—	—	—	
Manson, Josh	(Canada)	D	2021–2026	252	18	70	88	260	52	7	14	21	50	SC 2022
Marchment, Bryan	(Canada)	D	2002–2003	14	0	3	3	33	7	0	0	0	4	
Marha, Josef	(Czech Republic)	C	1995–1998	19	2	7	9	4	—	—	—	—	—	
Martinsen, Andreas	(Norway)	F	2015–2017	110	7	11	18	79	—	—	—	—	—	
Matte, Christian	(Canada)	RW	1996–2000	22	2	3	5	10	—	—	—	—	—	
Matteau, Stefan	(United States)	LW	2021–2022	1	0	0	0	0	—	—	—	—	—	
Matthias, Shawn	(Canada)	RW	2015–2016	20	6	5	11	8	—	—	—	—	—	
Mauldin, Greg	(United States)	L	2010–2011	29	5	5	10	8	—	—	—	—	—	
May, Brad	(Canada)	LW	2005–2007	64	3	6	9	90	3	0	0	0	0	
McAllister, Chris	(Canada)	D	2002–2004	48	0	1	1	88	1	0	0	0	0	
McAmmond, Dean	(Canada)	LW	2002–2003	41	10	8	18	10	—	—	—	—	—	
McClement, Jay	(Canada)	C	2010–2012	104	11	10	21	43	—	—	—	—	—	
McCormick, Cody	(Canada)	C	2003–2009	190	9	21	30	250	4	0	1	1	7	
McGinn, Jamie	(Canada)	LW	2011–2015	162	42	37	79	73	7	2	3	5	2	
McLean, Brett	(Canada)	C	2005–2007	160	24	51	75	87	8	0	1	1	4	
McLeod, Cody	(Canada)	LW	2007–2017	659	66	51	117	1359	23	2	1	3	53	
Megna, Jayson	(United States)	C	2019–2023	49	0	5	5	8	—	—	—	—	—	
Mercier, Justin	(United States)	LW	2009–2010	9	1	1	2	0	—	—	—	—	—	
Messier, Eric	(Canada)	D	1996–2003	385	25	47	72	130	69	3	5	8	22	SC 2001
Meyers, Ben	(United States)	C	2021–2024	53	6	0	6	6	6	0	0	0	2	
Middleton, Keaton	(Canada)	D	2020–2026	47	0	3	3	36	—	—	—	—	—	
Miller, Aaron	(United States)	D	1995–2001	301	17	43	60	173	60	3	8	11	36	
Mironov, Andrei	(Russia)	D	2017–2018	10	1	2	3	12	—	—	—	—	—	
Mitchell, John	(Canada)	C	2012–2017	326	45	61	106	183	—	—	—	—	—	
Mittelstadt, Casey	(United States)	C	2023–2025	81	15	29	44	24	11	3	6	9	2	
Moore, Steve	(Canada)	FW	2001–2004	69	5	7	12	41	—	—	—	—	—	
Morris, Derek	(Canada)	D	2002–2004	144	17	59	76	115	7	0	3	3	6	
Mueller, Peter	(United States)	RW	2009–2012	47	16	20	36	16	—	—	—	—	—	
Muir, Bryan	(Canada)	D	2000–2003	62	1	3	4	32	24	0	0	0	2	SC 2001
Murray, Ryan	(Canada)	D	2021–2022	37	0	4	4	2	—	—	—	—	—	SC 2022
Murray, Troy	(Canada)	C	1995–1996	63	7	14	21	22	8	0	0	0	19	SC 1996
Myrvold, Anders	(Norway)	D	1995–1996	4	0	1	1	6	—	—	—	—	—	
Namestnikov, Vladislav	(Russia)	C	2019–2020	9	4	2	6	8	12	4	1	5	4	
Necas, Martin	(Czech Republic)	RW	2024–2026	108	49	79	128	36	20	2	16	18	6	
Nedorost, Vaclav	(Czech Republic)	C	2001–2003	67	6	7	13	22	—	—	—	—	—	
Nelson, Brock	(United States)	C	2024–2026	100	39	39	78	40	20	2	5	7	12	
Nemeth, Patrik	(Sweden)	D	2017–2019; 2020–2021	155	5	22	27	100	23	0	2	2	14	
Newhook, Alex	(Canada)	C	2020–2023	159	27	39	66	36	27	1	6	7	10	SC 2022
Nichushkin, Valeri	(Russia)	RW	2019–2026	404	131	152	283	90	74	27	13	40	22	SC 2022
Nielsen, Tristan	(Canada)	F	2025–2026	4	0	1	1	0	—	—	—	—	—	
Nieminen, Ville	(Finland)	LW	1999–2002	104	24	22	46	68	23	4	6	10	20	SC 2001
Nieto, Matt	(United States)	LW	2016–2020; 2022–2023	287	38	52	90	40	39	5	8	13	10	
Nikolishin, Andrei	(Russia)	C	2003–2004	49	5	7	12	24	11	0	2	2	4	
Nolan, Owen	(Canada)	RW	1995–1996	9	4	4	8	9	—	—	—	—	—	
Nycholat, Lawrence	(Canada)	D	2008–2009	5	0	0	0	0	—	—	—	—	—	
O'Brien, Liam	(Canada)	C	2020–2021	12	0	3	3	40	—	—	—	—	—	
O'Brien, Shane	(Canada)	D	2011–2013	104	3	21	24	165	—	—	—	—	—	
O'Byrne, Ryan	(Canada)	D	2010–2013	172	2	19	21	182	—	—	—	—	—	
O'Connor, Logan	(United States)	RW	2018–2026	356	45	60	105	147	51	4	9	13	31	SC 2022
O'Neill, Wes	(Canada)	D	2008–2010	5	0	0	0	6	—	—	—	—	—	
O'Reilly, Ryan	(Canada)	C	2009–2015	427	90	156	246	64	13	3	4	7	2	
Obsut, Jaroslav	(Slovakia)	RW	2001–2002	3	0	0	0	0	—	—	—	—	—	
Odgers, Jeff	(Canada)	RW	1997–2000	205	8	13	21	634	25	1	0	1	39	
Olausson, Oskar	(Sweden)	RW	2022–2025	4	0	0	0	0	—	—	—	—	—	
Olofsson, Fredrik	(Sweden)	LW	2023–2024	57	3	6	9	8	—	—	—	—	—	
Olofsson, Victor	(Sweden)	RW	2025–2026	60	11	14	25	6	—	—	—	—	—	
Olver, Mark	(Canada)	C	2010–2013	74	10	12	22	39	—	—	—	—	—	
Ozolinsh, Sandis	(Latvia)	D	1995–2000	333	72	81	153	271	82	18	47	65	96	SC 1996
Palushaj, Aaron	(United States)	RW	2012–2013	25	2	7	9	8	—	—	—	—	—	
Parenteau, P. A.	(Canada)	RW	2012–2014	103	32	44	76	68	7	1	2	3	2	
Parise, Zach	(United States)	LW	2023–2024	30	5	5	10	8	11	2	1	3	0	
Parker, Scott	(United States)	RW	1998–2003; 2006–2008	237	5	11	16	538	5	0	0	0	4	SC 2001
Parros, George	(United States)	FW	2006–2007	2	0	0	0	0	—	—	—	—	—	
Parssinen, Juuso	(Finland)	C	2024–2025	22	2	4	6	8	—	—	—	—	—	
Pateryn, Greg	(United States)	D	2020–2021	8	0	0	0	4	—	—	—	—	—	
Paul, Jeff	(Canada)	D	2002–2003	2	0	0	0	7	—	—	—	—	—	
Pavel, Ondrej	(Czech Republic)	F	2023–2024	2	0	0	0	2	—	—	—	—	—	
Peltier, Derek	(United States)	D	2008–2010	14	0	0	0	2	—	—	—	—	—	
Podein, Shjon	(United States)	LW	1998–2002	239	34	36	70	160	59	8	4	12	34	SC 2001
Polin, Jason	(United States)	F	2023–2026	13	1	0	1	2	—	—	—	—	—	
Porter, Kevin	(United States)	C	2009–2012	125	20	15	35	44	4	0	0	0	0	
Pratt, Nolan	(Canada)	D	2000–2001	46	1	2	3	40	—	—	—	—	—	SC 2001
Preissing, Tom	(United States)	D	2009–2010	4	0	1	1	0	—	—	—	—	—	
Prishchepov, Nikita	(Russia)	C	2024–2025	10	0	0	0	0	—	—	—	—	—	
Prpic, Joel	(Canada)	C	2000–2001	3	0	0	0	2	—	—	—	—	—	
Quincey, Kyle	(Canada)	D	2009–2012	154	11	42	53	154	6	0	0	0	8	
Ranta, Sampo	(Finland)	LW	2020–2023	16	0	0	0	6	2	0	0	0	0	
Rantanen, Mikko	(Finland)	RW	2015–2025	619	287	394	681	376	81	34	67	101	28	SC 2022
Redmond, Zach	(Canada)	D	2014–2016	96	7	19	26	34	—	—	—	—	—	
Reid, Dave	(Canada)	LW	1999–2001	138	12	16	28	49	35	1	7	8	6	SC 2001
Reinprecht, Steven	(Canada)	C	2000–2003	165	40	64	104	38	50	10	10	20	10	SC 2001
Rendulic, Borna	(Croatia)	RW	2014–2016	14	1	1	2	6	—	—	—	—	—	
Renouf, Dan	(Canada)	D	2020–2021	18	0	3	3	16	—	—	—	—	—	
Ricci, Mike	(Canada)	C	1995–1998	131	19	44	63	113	39	8	15	23	35	SC 1996
Richardson, Brad	(Canada)	C	2005–2008	136	19	21	40	48	9	1	0	1	6	
Ritchie, Calum	(Canada)	C	2024–2025	7	1	0	1	0	—	—	—	—	—	
Rodrigues, Evan	(Canada)	C	2022–2023	69	16	23	39	30	7	1	4	5	2	
Rolston, Brian	(United States)	LW	1999–2000	50	8	10	18	12	—	—	—	—	—	
Rosen, Calle	(Sweden)	D	2019–2020	8	0	2	2	4	—	—	—	—	—	
Roy, Nicolas	(Canada)	C	2025–2026	15	3	2	5	13	13	3	3	6	4	
Rucinsky, Martin	(Czech Republic)	LW	1995–1996	22	4	11	15	14	—	—	—	—	—	
Russell, Cam	(Canada)	D	1998–1999	35	1	2	3	84	—	—	—	—	—	
Rychel, Warren	(Canada)	LW	1995–1996; 1997–1999	88	6	4	10	233	30	1	1	2	61	SC 1996
Rycroft, Mark	(Canada)	RW	2006–2007	66	6	6	12	31	—	—	—	—	—	
Saad, Brandon	(United States)	LW	2020–2021	44	15	9	24	12	10	7	1	8	12	
Sakic, Joe	(Canada)	C	1995–2009	870	391	624	1015	431	160	77	100	177	76	SC 1996, 2001; HHOF 2012; Ret #19
Salei, Ruslan	(Belarus)	D	2007–2010	101	8	26	34	105	11	1	4	5	4	
Sarault, Yves	(Canada)	LW	1996–1998	30	3	1	4	6	5	0	0	0	2	
Sarich, Cory	(Canada)	D	2013–2014	54	1	9	10	38	—	—	—	—	—	
Sauer, Kurt	(United States)	D	2003–2008	153	2	16	18	108	22	1	0	1	12	
Sedlak, Lukas	(Czech Republic)	C	2022–2023	3	0	0	0	0	—	—	—	—	—	
Selanne, Teemu	(Finland)	RW	2003–2004	78	16	16	32	32	10	0	3	3	2	HHOF 2017
Severyn, Brent	(Canada)	D	1996–1997	66	1	4	5	193	8	0	0	0	12	
Sgarbossa, Michael	(Canada)	C	2012–2015	9	0	1	1	14	—	—	—	—	—	
Shantz, Jeff	(Canada)	C	2002–2003	74	3	6	9	35	6	0	0	0	4	
Shattenkirk, Kevin	(United States)	D	2010–2011	46	7	19	26	20	—	—	—	—	—	
Shearer, Rob	(Canada)	C	2000–2001	2	0	0	0	0	—	—	—	—	—	
Sherwood, Kiefer	(United States)	RW	2020–2022	27	1	4	5	0	2	0	1	1	0	
Siemens, Duncan	(Canada)	D	2014–2018	20	1	1	2	25	5	0	0	0	0	
Sikura, Dylan	(Canada)	C	2021–2022	5	0	1	1	0	—	—	—	—	—	
Simon, Chris	(Canada)	LW	1995–1996	64	16	18	34	250	12	1	2	3	11	SC 1996
Skille, Jack	(United States)	RW	2015–2016	74	8	6	14	11	—	—	—	—	—	
Skoula, Martin	(Czech Republic)	D	1999–2004	383	27	86	113	198	68	1	13	14	18	SC 2001
Skrastins, Karlis	(Latvia)	D	2003–2008	275	9	33	42	141	20	0	3	3	12	
Slaney, John	(Canada)	D	1995–1996	7	0	3	3	4	—	—	—	—	—	
Smith, Ben	(United States)	RW	2016–2017	4	0	0	0	0	—	—	—	—	—	
Smith, Colin	(Canada)	C	2014–2015	1	0	0	0	0	—	—	—	—	—	
Smith, Dan	(Canada)	D	1998–2000	15	0	0	0	9	—	—	—	—	—	
Smith, D. J.	(Canada)	D	2002–2003	34	1	0	1	55	—	—	—	—	—	
Smith, Givani	(Canada)	RW	2024–2025	7	0	0	0	8	—	—	—	—	—	
Smith, Wyatt	(United States)	C	2007–2008	25	0	3	3	8	1	0	0	0	0	
Smyth, Ryan	(Canada)	LW	2007–2009	132	40	56	96	112	8	2	3	5	2	
Söderberg, Carl	(Sweden)	C	2015–2019; 2020–2021	332	57	96	153	110	22	1	5	6	12	
Solovyov, Ilya	(Belarus)	D	2025–2026	16	1	2	3	6	—	—	—	—	—	
Stastny, Paul	(United States)	C	2006–2014	538	160	298	458	264	22	8	10	18	14	
Stephens, Charlie	(Canada)	C	2002–2004	8	0	2	2	4	—	—	—	—	—	
Stewart, Chris	(Canada)	RW	2008–2011	166	52	61	113	165	6	3	0	3	4	
Stienburg, Matt	(Canada)	RW	2024–2025	8	0	0	0	22	—	—	—	—	—	
Stoa, Ryan	(United States)	C	2009–2011	37	4	3	7	20	1	0	0	0	2	
Stollery, Karl	(Canada)	D	2013–2015	7	0	0	0	4	—	—	—	—	—	
Street, Ben	(Canada)	C	2014–2016	10	0	0	0	4	—	—	—	—	—	
Stuart, Brad	(Canada)	D	2014–2016	71	3	10	13	16	—	—	—	—	—	
Sturm, Nico	(Germany)	C	2021–2022	21	0	3	3	6	13	0	2	2	2	SC 2022
Svatos, Marek	(Slovakia)	RW	2003–2010	316	96	68	164	207	14	2	5	7	4	
Talbot, Maxime	(Canada)	C	2013–2015	133	12	28	40	70	7	0	0	0	4	
Tanguay, Alex	(Canada)	LW	1999–2006; 2013–2016	598	167	321	488	287	83	18	32	50	28	SC 2001
Tatar, Tomas	(Slovakia)	LW	2023–2024	27	1	8	9	10	—	—	—	—	—	
Timmins, Conor	(Canada)	D	2019–2021	33	0	7	7	8	12	0	0	0	4	
Tjarnqvist, Daniel	(Sweden)	D	2008–2009	37	2	2	4	8	—	—	—	—	—	
Toews, Devon	(Canada)	D	2020–2026	425	54	202	256	138	67	11	40	51	16	SC 2022
Toninato, Dominic	(United States)	C	2017–2019	39	1	2	3	12	—	—	—	—	—	
Trenin, Yakov	(Russia)	C	2023–2024	16	2	1	3	2	10	1	0	1	4	
Trepanier, Pascal	(Canada)	D	1997–1998; 2001–2002	89	4	10	14	77	2	0	0	0	0	
Tucker, Darcy	(Canada)	RW	2008–2010	134	18	22	40	114	6	0	0	0	2	
Tufte, Riley	(United States)	LW	2023–2024	5	1	1	2	2	—	—	—	—	—	
Turgeon, Pierre	(Canada)	C	2005–2007	79	20	33	53	42	5	0	2	2	6	
Tynan, T. J.	(Canada)	C	2019–2020; 2024–2026	26	0	2	2	6	—	—	—	—	—	
Tyutin, Fedor	(Russia)	D	2016–2017	69	1	12	13	38	—	—	—	—	—	
Vaananen, Ossi	(Finland)	D	2003–2007	139	2	10	12	127	12	0	1	1	18	
Van der Gulik, David	(Canada)	LW	2010–2014	42	2	9	11	10	—	—	—	—	—	
Vernace, Michael	(Canada)	D	2008–2009	12	0	0	0	8	—	—	—	—	—	
Vesey, Jimmy	(United States)	LW	2024–2025	10	1	1	2	0	—	—	—	—	—	
Vincour, Tomas	(Czech Republic)	RW	2012–2013; 2014–2015	9	0	2	2	4	—	—	—	—	—	
Vrbata, Radim	(Czech Republic)	RW	2001–2003	118	29	31	60	30	9	0	0	0	0	
Wagner, Chris	(United States)	C	2015–2016; 2023–2025	67	6	1	7	32	2	0	0	0	0	
Walker, Sean	(Canada)	D	2023–2024	18	4	3	7	16	11	0	0	0	6	
Warsofsky, David	(United States)	D	2017–2018	16	0	5	5	0	—	—	—	—	—	
White, Brian	(United States)	D	1998–1999	2	0	0	0	0	—	—	—	—	—	
Wiercioch, Patrick	(Canada)	D	2016–2017	57	4	8	12	23	—	—	—	—	—	
Willsie, Brian	(Canada)	RW	1999–2003; 2008–2010	115	8	11	19	43	10	1	1	2	4	
Wilson, Colin	(United States)	C	2017–2020	130	18	31	49	14	18	4	5	9	2	
Wilson, Landon	(United States)	RW	1995–1997	16	2	2	4	29	—	—	—	—	—	
Wilson, Ryan	(Canada)	D	2009–2015	230	7	60	67	157	8	0	3	3	2	
Winnik, Daniel	(Canada)	L	2010–2012	143	16	28	44	77	—	—	—	—	—	
Wolanin, Craig	(United States)	D	1995–1996	75	7	20	27	50	7	1	0	1	8	SC 1996
Wolski, Wojtek	(Canada)	LW	2005–2010	302	73	120	193	81	15	3	6	9	4	
Wood, Miles	(United States)	LW	2023–2025	111	13	21	34	123	12	3	0	3	13	
Worrell, Peter	(Canada)	LW	2003–2004	49	3	1	4	179	—	—	—	—	—	
Yakupov, Nail	(Russia)	RW	2017–2018	58	9	7	16	26	—	—	—	—	—	
Yelle, Stephane	(Canada)	C	1995–2002; 2009–2010	516	54	90	144	256	117	5	17	22	56	SC 1996, 2001
Yip, Brandon	(Canada)	RW	2009–2012	113	23	18	41	84	6	2	2	4	6	
Young, Scott	(United States)	RW	1995–1997	153	39	58	97	64	39	7	14	21	24	SC 1996
Zadorov, Nikita	(Russia)	D	2015–2020	289	18	41	59	328	33	4	4	8	74	
Zanon, Greg	(Canada)	D	2012–2013	44	0	6	6	28	—	—	—	—	—	
