= 2003–04 Chicago Blackhawks season =

National Hockey League team season

2003–04 Chicago Blackhawks
- Division: 5th Central
- Conference: 15th Western
- 2003–04 record: 20–43–11–8
- Home record: 13–17–6–5
- Road record: 7–26–5–3
- Goals for: 188
- Goals against: 259

Team information
- General manager: Mike Smith (Oct.); Bob Pulford (Oct.–Apr.)
- Coach: Brian Sutter
- Captain: Alexei Zhamnov (Oct.–Feb.); Vacant (Feb.–Apr.)
- Alternate captains: Mark Bell (Feb.–Apr.); Bryan Berard (Feb.–Apr.); Kyle Calder; Steve Sullivan (Oct.–Feb.)
- Arena: United Center
- Average attendance: 13,253 (64.6%)
- Minor league affiliates: Norfolk Admirals; Florence Pride; Indianapolis Ice

Team leaders
- Goals: Tuomo Ruutu (23)
- Assists: Bryan Berard (34)
- Points: Tyler Arnason (55)
- Penalty minutes: Scott Nichol (145)
- Plus/minus: Stephane Robidas (+6)
- Wins: Craig Anderson (6); Michael Leighton (6)
- Goals against average: Craig Anderson (2.84)

The 2003–04 Chicago Blackhawks season was the 78th season of operation of the Chicago Blackhawks in the National Hockey League (NHL). The Blackhawks missed the playoffs for the second consecutive season.

== Regular season ==
General manager Mike Smith was fired on October 24, 2003. Bob Pulford replaced Smith on an interim basis until a replacement could be found.

On December 11, 2003, Mark Bell scored just 15 seconds into the overtime period to give the Blackhawks a 4–3 home win over the Detroit Red Wings. The Sabres' Derek Roy would match that mark in the overtime period on March 17, 2004, in a 4–3 Buffalo road win over the Atlanta Thrashers. Both goals would prove to be the fastest overtime goals scored during the 2003–04 NHL regular season. In February, team captain Alexei Zhamnov was traded to the Philadelphia Flyers. The team chose not to name a replacement for the rest of the season.

=== Final standings ===
Central Division
No.	CR		GP	W	L	T	OTL	GF	GA	Pts
1	1	**Detroit Red Wings**	82	48	21	11	2	255	189	109
2	7	**St. Louis Blues**	82	39	30	11	2	191	198	91
3	8	**Nashville Predators**	82	38	29	11	4	216	217	91
4	14	Columbus Blue Jackets	82	25	45	8	4	177	238	62
5	15	Chicago Blackhawks	82	20	43	11	8	188	259	59

Note: CR = Conference rank; GP = Games played; W = Wins; L = Losses; T = Ties; OTL = Overtime loss; GF = Goals for; GA = Goals against; Pts = Points
Bolded teams qualified for the playoffs.

Western Conference
R		Div	GP	W	L	T	OTL	GF	GA	Pts
**1**	**P-** Detroit Red Wings	**CE**	**82**	**48**	**21**	**11**	**2**	**255**	**189**	109
**2**	**Y-** San Jose Sharks	**PA**	**82**	**43**	**21**	**12**	**6**	**255**	**183**	104
**3**	**Y-** Vancouver Canucks	**NW**	**82**	**43**	**24**	**10**	**5**	**235**	**194**	101
**4**	**X-** Colorado Avalanche	**NW**	**82**	**40**	**22**	**13**	**7**	**236**	**198**	100
**5**	**X-** Dallas Stars	**PA**	**82**	**41**	**26**	**13**	**2**	**194**	**175**	97
**6**	**X-** Calgary Flames	**NW**	**82**	**42**	**30**	**7**	**3**	**200**	**176**	94
**7**	**X-** St. Louis Blues	**CE**	**82**	**39**	**30**	**11**	**2**	**191**	**198**	91
**8**	**X-** Nashville Predators	**CE**	**82**	**38**	**29**	**11**	**4**	**216**	**217**	91
8.5
9	Edmonton Oilers	NW	82	36	29	12	5	221	208	89
10	Minnesota Wild	NW	82	30	29	20	3	188	183	83
11	Los Angeles Kings	PA	82	28	29	16	9	205	217	81
12	Mighty Ducks of Anaheim	PA	82	29	35	10	8	184	213	76
13	Phoenix Coyotes	PA	82	22	36	18	6	188	245	68
14	Columbus Blue Jackets	CE	82	25	45	8	4	177	238	62
15	Chicago Blackhawks	CE	82	20	43	11	8	188	259	59

Divisions: CE – Central, PA – Pacific, NW – Northwest

P – Clinched Presidents Trophy; Y – Clinched division; X – Clinched playoff spot

== Schedule and results ==
2003–04 regular season
October: 3–5–3–0 (home: 2–2–0–0; road: 1–3–3–0)

Game	Date	Score	Opponent	Record	Recap
1	October 8, 2003	1–0	Minnesota Wild (2003–04)	1–0–0–0	W
2	October 10, 2003	0–5	@ Colorado Avalanche (2003–04)	1–1–0–0	L
3	October 12, 2003	2–4	Los Angeles Kings (2003–04)	1–2–0–0	L
4	October 16, 2003	1–2	@ Columbus Blue Jackets (2003–04)	1–3–0–0	L
5	October 18, 2003	2–7	@ Atlanta Thrashers (2003–04)	1–4–0–0	L
6	October 19, 2003	3–1	Nashville Predators (2003–04)	2–4–0–0	W
7	October 23, 2003	3–3 OT	@ San Jose Sharks (2003–04)	2–4–1–0	T
8	October 25, 2003	3–2	@ Los Angeles Kings (2003–04)	3–4–1–0	W
9	October 26, 2003	1–1 OT	@ Mighty Ducks of Anaheim (2003–04)	3–4–2–0	T
10	October 28, 2003	2–2 OT	@ Phoenix Coyotes (2003–04)	3–4–3–0	T
11	October 30, 2003	0–1	Pittsburgh Penguins (2003–04)	3–5–3–0	L

November: 3–7–1–3 (home: 1–1–1–2; road: 2–6–0–1)

Game	Date	Score	Opponent	Record	Recap
12	November 1, 2003	3–2	@ St. Louis Blues (2003–04)	4–5–3–0	W
13	November 2, 2003	3–1	Mighty Ducks of Anaheim (2003–04)	5–5–3–0	W
14	November 7, 2003	2–1	@ Nashville Predators (2003–04)	6–5–3–0	W
15	November 9, 2003	3–4 OT	Colorado Avalanche (2003–04)	6–5–3–1	OTL
16	November 10, 2003	0–3	@ Detroit Red Wings (2003–04)	6–6–3–1	L
17	November 12, 2003	2–6	Calgary Flames (2003–04)	6–7–3–1	L
18	November 14, 2003	3–4 OT	Detroit Red Wings (2003–04)	6–7–3–2	OTL
19	November 16, 2003	2–2 OT	New York Rangers (2003–04)	6–7–4–2	T
20	November 18, 2003	2–5	@ Edmonton Oilers (2003–04)	6–8–4–2	L
21	November 20, 2003	2–3 OT	@ Vancouver Canucks (2003–04)	6–8–4–3	OTL
22	November 22, 2003	1–2	@ Calgary Flames (2003–04)	6–9–4–3	L
23	November 26, 2003	2–3	@ San Jose Sharks (2003–04)	6–10–4–3	L
24	November 28, 2003	3–4	@ Mighty Ducks of Anaheim (2003–04)	6–11–4–3	L
25	November 29, 2003	1–3	@ Los Angeles Kings (2003–04)	6–12–4–3	L

December: 3–7–3–1 (home: 3–2–3–1; road: 0–5–0–0)

Game	Date	Score	Opponent	Record	Recap
26	December 3, 2003	2–3	Buffalo Sabres (2003–04)	6–13–4–3	L
27	December 6, 2003	2–5	@ New York Islanders (2003–04)	6–14–4–3	L
28	December 7, 2003	2–2 OT	Phoenix Coyotes (2003–04)	6–14–5–3	T
29	December 11, 2003	4–3 OT	Detroit Red Wings (2003–04)	7–14–5–3	W
30	December 12, 2003	0–1	@ Dallas Stars (2003–04)	7–15–5–3	L
31	December 14, 2003	1–1 OT	Dallas Stars (2003–04)	7–15–6–3	T
32	December 18, 2003	1–6	@ Ottawa Senators (2003–04)	7–16–6–3	L
33	December 19, 2003	2–3	@ Detroit Red Wings (2003–04)	7–17–6–3	L
34	December 21, 2003	2–2 OT	New Jersey Devils (2003–04)	7–17–7–3	T
35	December 23, 2003	3–0	St. Louis Blues (2003–04)	8–17–7–3	W
36	December 26, 2003	1–4	Columbus Blue Jackets (2003–04)	8–18–7–3	L
37	December 28, 2003	3–0	Detroit Red Wings (2003–04)	9–18–7–3	W
38	December 29, 2003	0–1	@ Pittsburgh Penguins (2003–04)	9–19–7–3	L
39	December 31, 2003	3–4 OT	Vancouver Canucks (2003–04)	9–19–7–4	OTL

January: 4–9–0–1 (home: 3–2–0–1; road: 1–7–0–0)

Game	Date	Score	Opponent	Record	Recap
40	January 2, 2004	2–1	San Jose Sharks (2003–04)	10–19–7–4	W
41	January 4, 2004	3–4	Edmonton Oilers (2003–04)	10–20–7–4	L
42	January 7, 2004	4–7	@ Minnesota Wild (2003–04)	10–21–7–4	L
43	January 8, 2004	3–1	Calgary Flames (2003–04)	11–21–7–4	W
44	January 11, 2004	4–5 OT	Colorado Avalanche (2003–04)	11–21–7–5	OTL
45	January 12, 2004	4–7	@ St. Louis Blues (2003–04)	11–22–7–5	L
46	January 14, 2004	2–4	@ Detroit Red Wings (2003–04)	11–23–7–5	L
47	January 18, 2004	1–2	Los Angeles Kings (2003–04)	11–24–7–5	L
48	January 21, 2004	2–4	@ Minnesota Wild (2003–04)	11–25–7–5	L
49	January 22, 2004	7–0	Columbus Blue Jackets (2003–04)	12–25–7–5	W
50	January 24, 2004	3–4	@ Columbus Blue Jackets (2003–04)	12–26–7–5	L
51	January 27, 2004	2–3	@ Vancouver Canucks (2003–04)	12–27–7–5	L
52	January 29, 2004	2–5	@ Edmonton Oilers (2003–04)	12–28–7–5	L
53	January 30, 2004	5–3	@ Calgary Flames (2003–04)	13–28–7–5	W

February: 5–5–1–0 (home: 3–3–1–0; road: 2–2–0–0)

Game	Date	Score	Opponent	Record	Recap
54	February 1, 2004	4–6	@ Montreal Canadiens (2003–04)	13–29–7–5	L
55	February 3, 2004	4–1	@ Toronto Maple Leafs (2003–04)	14–29–7–5	W
56	February 11, 2004	5–2	Nashville Predators (2003–04)	15–29–7–5	W
57	February 14, 2004	2–1 OT	Boston Bruins (2003–04)	16–29–7–5	W
58	February 15, 2004	0–4	Washington Capitals (2003–04)	16–30–7–5	L
59	February 19, 2004	3–6	San Jose Sharks (2003–04)	16–31–7–5	L
60	February 22, 2004	3–2 OT	St. Louis Blues (2003–04)	17–31–7–5	W
61	February 24, 2004	1–3	@ Philadelphia Flyers (2003–04)	17–32–7–5	L
62	February 25, 2004	4–3	@ Columbus Blue Jackets (2003–04)	18–32–7–5	W
63	February 27, 2004	3–4	Columbus Blue Jackets (2003–04)	18–33–7–5	L
64	February 29, 2004	2–2 OT	Florida Panthers (2003–04)	18–33–8–5	T

March: 2–8–3–2 (home: 1–6–1–1; road: 1–2–2–1)

Game	Date	Score	Opponent	Record	Recap
65	March 1, 2004	2–2 OT	@ Nashville Predators (2003–04)	18–33–9–5	T
66	March 3, 2004	3–5	Tampa Bay Lightning (2003–04)	18–34–9–5	L
67	March 5, 2004	2–5	Mighty Ducks of Anaheim (2003–04)	18–35–9–5	L
68	March 7, 2004	3–4 OT	Edmonton Oilers (2003–04)	18–35–9–6	OTL
69	March 11, 2004	4–6	@ New Jersey Devils (2003–04)	18–36–9–6	L
70	March 12, 2004	4–3	@ Washington Capitals (2003–04)	19–36–9–6	W
71	March 14, 2004	0–4	Dallas Stars (2003–04)	19–37–9–6	L
72	March 17, 2004	2–3	Carolina Hurricanes (2003–04)	19–38–9–6	L
73	March 19, 2004	4–3 OT	Vancouver Canucks (2003–04)	20–38–9–6	W
74	March 21, 2004	2–2 OT	Phoenix Coyotes (2003–04)	20–38–10–6	T
75	March 23, 2004	2–2 OT	@ Colorado Avalanche (2003–04)	20–38–11–6	T
76	March 25, 2004	2–8	Minnesota Wild (2003–04)	20–39–11–6	L
77	March 27, 2004	3–4 OT	@ St. Louis Blues (2003–04)	20–39–11–7	OTL
78	March 28, 2004	1–3	St. Louis Blues (2003–04)	20–40–11–7	L
79	March 30, 2004	2–5	@ Nashville Predators (2003–04)	20–41–11–7	L

April: 0–2–0–1 (home: 0–1–0–0; road: 0–1–0–1)

Game	Date	Score	Opponent	Record	Recap
80	April 1, 2004	1–3	Nashville Predators (2003–04)	20–42–11–7	L
81	April 3, 2004	1–2 OT	@ Phoenix Coyotes (2003–04)	20–42–11–8	OTL
82	April 4, 2004	2–5	@ Dallas Stars (2003–04)	20–43–11–8	L

Legend: W Win (2 points) L Loss (0 points) T Tie (1 point) OTL Overtime loss (1 point)

== Player statistics ==
=== Scoring ===
- Position abbreviations: C = Center; D = Defense; G = Goaltender; LW = Left wing; RW = Right wing
- † = Joined team via a transaction (e.g., trade, waivers, signing) during the season. Stats reflect time with the Blackhawks only.
- ‡ = Left team via a transaction (e.g., trade, waivers, release) during the season. Stats reflect time with the Blackhawks only.

No.	Player	Pos	Regular season					
No.	Player	Pos	GP	G	A	Pts	+/-	PIM
39	Tyler Arnason	C	82	22	33	55	−13	16
4 (Note: Berard started his season wearing number 3 but switched numbers after former Blackhawk Keith Magnuson died in a car accident on December 15.)	Bryan Berard†	D	58	13	34	47	−24	53
28	Mark Bell	C	82	21	24	45	−14	106
15	Tuomo Ruutu	LW	82	23	21	44	−31	58
26	Steve Sullivan‡	RW	56	15	28	43	−7	36
19	Kyle Calder	LW	66	21	18	39	−18	29
53	Brett McLean	C	76	11	20	31	−11	54
43	Nathan Dempsey‡	D	58	8	17	25	−5	30
12	Scott Nichol	C	75	7	11	18	−16	145
13	Alex Zhamnov‡	C	23	6	12	18	−8	14
22	Igor Korolev	C	62	3	10	13	−15	22
20	Ville Nieminen‡	LW	60	2	11	13	−15	40
17	Stephane Robidas†	D	45	2	10	12	6	33
23	Jim Vandermeer†	D	23	2	10	12	−6	58
55	Eric Daze	RW	19	4	7	11	−7	0
2	Deron Quint	D	51	4	7	11	−26	18
50	Igor Radulov	LW	36	4	7	11	−2	18
36	Mikhail Yakubov	C	30	1	7	8	−12	8
25	Alexander Karpovtsev‡	D	24	0	7	7	−17	14
59	Travis Moen	LW	82	4	2	6	−17	142
44	Burke Henry	D	23	2	4	6	0	24
14	Ryan VandenBussche	RW	65	4	1	5	−10	120
11	Matt Keith	RW	20	2	3	5	−5	10
8	Steve Poapst	D	53	2	2	4	−16	26
5	Steve McCarthy	D	25	1	3	4	−9	8
34	Jason Strudwick	D	54	1	3	4	−16	73
32	Pavel Vorobiev	RW	18	1	3	4	1	4
20	Eric Nickulas†	RW	21	1	1	2	−6	8
6	Anton Babchuk	D	5	0	2	2	−1	2
49	Michael Leighton	G	34	0	2	2		2
33	Shawn Thornton	RW	8	1	0	1	2	23
56	Johnathan Aitken	D	41	0	1	1	−9	70
42	Michal Barinka	D	9	0	1	1	−5	6
16	Matt Ellison	RW	10	0	1	1	−3	0
42	Jon Klemm‡	D	19	0	1	1	6	20
47	Lasse Kukkonen	D	10	0	1	1	−2	4
45	Quintin Laing	LW	3	0	1	1	1	0
31	Craig Anderson	G	21	0	0	0		4
30	Adam Munro†	G	7	0	0	0		2
29	Steve Passmore	G	9	0	0	0		0
41	Jocelyn Thibault	G	14	0	0	0		0
40	Matt Underhill†	G	1	0	0	0		0

=== Goaltending ===
- † = Joined team via a transaction (e.g., trade, waivers, signing) during the season. Stats reflect time with the Blackhawks only.

No.	Player	Regular season									
No.	Player	GP	W	L	T	SA	GA	GAA	SV%	SO	TOI
31	Craig Anderson	21	6	14	0	602	57	2.84	.905	1	1205
49	Michael Leighton	34	6	18	8	987	99	2.99	.900	2	1988
41	Jocelyn Thibault	14	5	7	2	450	39	2.85	.913	1	821
29	Steve Passmore	9	2	6	0	221	23	2.89	.896	0	478
30	Adam Munro†	7	1	5	1	217	26	3.66	.880	0	426
40	Matt Underhill†	1	0	1	0	33	4	3.93	.879	0	61

== Awards and records ==
=== Awards ===
Type	Award/honor	Recipient	Ref
League (annual)	Bill Masterton Memorial Trophy	Bryan Berard	
League (in-season)	NHL Defensive Player of the Week	Michael Leighton (December 30)	
League (in-season)	NHL Rookie of the Month	Tuomo Ruutu (March)	
League (in-season)	NHL YoungStars Game selection	Tuomo Ruutu	

=== Milestones ===
Milestone	Player	Date	Ref
First game	Lasse Kukkonen	October 8, 2003	
First game	Travis Moen	October 8, 2003	
First game	Tuomo Ruutu	October 8, 2003	
First game	Pavel Vorobiev	October 12, 2003	
First game	Mikhail Yakubov	November 28, 2003	
First game	Anton Babchuk	January 8, 2004	
First game	Matt Ellison	February 1, 2004	
First game	Matt Keith	February 24, 2004	
First game	Quintin Laing	February 29, 2004	
First game	Adam Munro	March 1, 2004	
First game	Matt Underhill	March 7, 2004	
First game	Michal Barinka	March 11, 2004	

== Transactions ==
The Blackhawks were involved in the following transactions from June 10, 2003, the day after the deciding game of the 2003 Stanley Cup Finals, through June 7, 2004, the day of the deciding game of the 2004 Stanley Cup Finals.

=== Trades ===
Date	Details		Ref
June 21, 2003	To Colorado Avalanche: Andrei Nikolishin	To Chicago Blackhawks: 4th-round pick in 2004	
June 22, 2003	To Florida Panthers: Dmytro Tolkunov	To Chicago Blackhawks: 9th-round pick in 2003	
June 22, 2003	To San Jose Sharks: Florida's 9th-round pick in 2003	To Chicago Blackhawks: 8th-round pick in 2004	
November 17, 2003	To Dallas Stars: Jon Klemm; 4th-round pick in 2004	To Chicago Blackhawks: Stephane Robidas; 2nd-round pick in 2004	
February 16, 2004	To Nashville Predators: Steve Sullivan	To Chicago Blackhawks: 2nd-round pick in 2004; 2nd-round pick in 2005	
February 19, 2004	To Philadelphia Flyers: Alexei Zhamnov; 4th-round pick in 2004	To Chicago Blackhawks: Jim Vandermeer; Rights to Colin Fraser; 2nd-round pick in 2004	
February 24, 2004	To Calgary Flames: Ville Nieminen	To Chicago Blackhawks: Jason Morgan; Conditional draft pick	
March 2, 2004	To Florida Panthers: Rights to Ty Jones	To Chicago Blackhawks: Future considerations	
March 2, 2004	To Los Angeles Kings: Nathan Dempsey	To Chicago Blackhawks: 4th-round pick in 2005; Future considerations	
March 9, 2004	To New York Islanders: Alexander Karpovtsev	To Chicago Blackhawks: 4th-round pick in 2005	

=== Players acquired ===
Date	Player	Former team	Term	Via	Ref
July 1, 2003	Scott Nichol	Calgary Flames		Free agency	
July 29, 2003	Ville Nieminen	Pittsburgh Penguins		Free agency	
August 5, 2003	Deron Quint	Phoenix Coyotes		Free agency	
October 31, 2003	Bryan Berard	Boston Bruins		Free agency	
February 18, 2004	Adam Munro	Norfolk Admirals (AHL)		Free agency (Note: Drafted in the first round of the 2001 draft by Chicago, Munro’s rights expired without being signed to a contract prior to the 2003 draft. Chicago received a compensatory second round pick, 59th overall, in that draft.)	
February 24, 2004	Eric Nickulas	St. Louis Blues		Waivers	
March 4, 2004	Matt Underhill	Norfolk Admirals (AHL)		Free agency	
March 31, 2004	Nick Kuiper	University of Massachusetts Amherst (HE)		Free agency	

=== Players lost ===
Date	Player	New team	Via (Note: In parentheses is the player's free agency group on July 1 if applicable.)	Ref
July 23, 2003	Matt Henderson	Iserlohn Roosters (DEL)	Free agency (VI)	
July 24, 2003	Mike Peluso	Philadelphia Flyers	Free agency (VI)	
July 25, 2003	Casey Hankinson	Anaheim Mighty Ducks	Free agency (VI)	
July 25, 2003	Chris Simon	New York Rangers	Free agency (III)	
July 31, 2003	Mike Eastwood	Pittsburgh Penguins	Free agency (III)	
August 1, 2003	Sami Helenius	Jokerit (Liiga)	Free agency (UFA)	
August 14, 2003	Kent Huskins	Florida Panthers	Free agency (UFA)	
August 20, 2003	Todd Gill	Florida Panthers	Free agency (III)	
September 23, 2003	Bob Probert		Retirement (III)	
October 27, 2003	Michael Souza	Florence Pride (ECHL)	Free agency (VI)	
December 27, 2003	Louie DeBrusk	Hartford Wolf Pack (AHL)	Free agency (III)	

=== Signings ===
Date	Player	Term	Contract type	Ref
July 1, 2003	Shawn Thornton		Re-signing	
July 2, 2003	Jason Strudwick		Re-signing	
July 15, 2003	Michal Barinka		Entry-level	
July 15, 2003	Vladimir Gusev		Entry-level	
July 15, 2003	Alexander Kozhevnikov		Entry-level	
July 15, 2003	Lasse Kukkonen		Entry-level	
July 29, 2003	Mark Bell		Re-signing	
August 1, 2003	Steve McCarthy		Re-signing	
August 13, 2003	Ajay Baines		Re-signing	
August 27, 2003	Tyler Arnason		Re-signing	
August 27, 2003	Matt Ellison		Entry-level	
August 28, 2003	Tuomo Ruutu		Entry-level	
October 8, 2003	Duncan Keith		Entry-level	
March 22, 2004	Mike Brodeur		Entry-level	
March 22, 2004	James Wisniewski		Entry-level	

== Draft picks ==
Chicago's draft picks at the 2003 NHL entry draft held at the Gaylord Entertainment Center in Nashville, Tennessee.

Round	#	Player	Nationality	College/Junior/Club team (League)
1	14	Brent Seabrook	Canada	Lethbridge Hurricanes (WHL)
2	52	Corey Crawford	Canada	Moncton Wildcats (QMJHL)
2	59	Michal Barinka	Czech Republic	HC Ceske Budejovice (Czech Republic)
5	151	Lasse Kukkonen	Finland	Karpat (Finland)
5	156	Alexei Ivanov	Russia	Lokomotiv Yaroslavl (Russia)
6	181	Johan Andersson	Sweden	Troja (Sweden)
7	211	Mike Brodeur	Canada	Camrose Kodiaks (AJHL)
8	245	Dustin Byfuglien	United States	Prince George Cougars (WHL)
9	275	Michael Grenzy	United States	Chicago Steel (USHL)
9	282	Chris Porter	Canada	Lincoln Stars (USHL)

== See also ==
- 2003–04 NHL season
