= 2003–04 Dallas Stars season =

National Hockey League team season

2003–04 Dallas Stars
- Division: 2nd Pacific
- Conference: 5th Western
- 2003–04 record: 41–26–13–2
- Home record: 26–7–8–0
- Road record: 15–19–5–2
- Goals for: 194
- Goals against: 175

Team information
- General manager: Doug Armstrong
- Coach: Dave Tippett
- Captain: Mike Modano
- Alternate captains: Bill Guerin; Richard Matvichuk; Brenden Morrow; Sergei Zubov
- Arena: American Airlines Center
- Average attendance: 18,355
- Minor league affiliates: Utah Grizzlies; Idaho Steelheads

Team leaders
- Goals: Bill Guerin (34)
- Assists: Jason Arnott (36)
- Points: Bill Guerin (69)
- Penalty minutes: Steve Ott (152)
- Plus/minus: Jason Arnott (+23)
- Wins: Marty Turco (37)
- Goals against average: Marty Turco (1.98)

The 2003–04 Dallas Stars season was the Stars' 11th season, 37th overall of the franchise.

== Off-season ==
On July 3, defenseman Derian Hatcher signed a five-year contract with the Detroit Red Wings. Mike Modano was named his replacement as team captain later the same day.

== Regular season ==
Only 369 total goals (194 for Dallas, 175 for their opponents) were scored in the Stars' regular-season games: the lowest total of all 30 NHL teams. Twenty-one games of their 82 regular-season games ended in a shutout. They also tied the Columbus Blue Jackets for most times shut out, with 11.

=== Final standings ===
Pacific Division
No.	CR		GP	W	L	T	OTL	GF	GA	Pts
1	2	**San Jose Sharks**	82	43	21	12	6	219	183	104
2	5	**Dallas Stars**	82	41	26	13	2	194	175	97
3	11	Los Angeles Kings	82	28	29	16	9	205	217	81
4	12	Mighty Ducks of Anaheim	82	29	35	10	8	184	213	76
5	13	Phoenix Coyotes	82	22	36	18	6	188	245	68

Note: CR = Conference rank; GP = Games played; W = Wins; L = Losses; T = Ties; OTL = Overtime loss; GF = Goals for; GA = Goals against; Pts = Points
Bolded teams qualified for the playoffs.

Western Conference
R		Div	GP	W	L	T	OTL	GF	GA	Pts
**1**	**P-** Detroit Red Wings	**CE**	**82**	**48**	**21**	**11**	**2**	**255**	**189**	109
**2**	**Y-** San Jose Sharks	**PA**	**82**	**43**	**21**	**12**	**6**	**255**	**183**	104
**3**	**Y-** Vancouver Canucks	**NW**	**82**	**43**	**24**	**10**	**5**	**235**	**194**	101
**4**	**X-** Colorado Avalanche	**NW**	**82**	**40**	**22**	**13**	**7**	**236**	**198**	100
**5**	**X-** Dallas Stars	**PA**	**82**	**41**	**26**	**13**	**2**	**194**	**175**	97
**6**	**X-** Calgary Flames	**NW**	**82**	**42**	**30**	**7**	**3**	**200**	**176**	94
**7**	**X-** St. Louis Blues	**CE**	**82**	**39**	**30**	**11**	**2**	**191**	**198**	91
**8**	**X-** Nashville Predators	**CE**	**82**	**38**	**29**	**11**	**4**	**216**	**217**	91
8.5
9	Edmonton Oilers	NW	82	36	29	12	5	221	208	89
10	Minnesota Wild	NW	82	30	29	20	3	188	183	83
11	Los Angeles Kings	PA	82	28	29	16	9	205	217	81
12	Mighty Ducks of Anaheim	PA	82	29	35	10	8	184	213	76
13	Phoenix Coyotes	PA	82	22	36	18	6	188	245	68
14	Columbus Blue Jackets	CE	82	25	45	8	4	177	238	62
15	Chicago Blackhawks	CE	82	20	43	11	8	188	259	59

Divisions: CE – Central, PA – Pacific, NW – Northwest

P – Clinched Presidents Trophy; Y – Clinched division; X – Clinched playoff spot

== Playoffs ==
=== Round 1: (4) Colorado Avalanche vs. (5) Dallas Stars ===
The series began in Colorado. The Avalanche won the first two games; game 1 was by a score of 3-1 and game 2 was a 5-2 victory. Games 3 & 4 shifted to Dallas. Game 3 was won by Dallas 4-3 in overtime. However, in game 4, the Avalanche responded with a 3-2 double overtime win. Back in Denver for game 5, Colorado would go on to win 5-1 and clinch the series 4-1.

== Schedule and results ==
=== Regular season ===
2003–04 regular season
October: 6–4–0–0 (home: 4–2–0–0; road: 2–2–0–0)

Game	Date	Score	Opponent	Record	Recap
1	October 8, 2003	4–1	Mighty Ducks of Anaheim (2003–04)	1–0–0–0	W
2	October 11, 2003	3–1	@ Nashville Predators (2003–04)	2–0–0–0	W
3	October 13, 2003	3–4	@ Buffalo Sabres (2003–04)	2–1–0–0	L
4	October 15, 2003	0–2	Boston Bruins (2003–04)	2–2–0–0	L
5	October 17, 2003	4–2	Washington Capitals (2003–04)	3–2–0–0	W
6	October 19, 2003	3–1	Minnesota Wild (2003–04)	4–2–0–0	W
7	October 22, 2003	1–3	Toronto Maple Leafs (2003–04)	4–3–0–0	L
8	October 24, 2003	0–4	@ Detroit Red Wings (2003–04)	4–4–0–0	L
9	October 25, 2003	3–2	@ Columbus Blue Jackets (2003–04)	5–4–0–0	W
10	October 29, 2003	4–3 OT	Calgary Flames (2003–04)	6–4–0–0	W

November: 5–7–3–0 (home: 4–2–2–0; road: 1–5–1–0)

Game	Date	Score	Opponent	Record	Recap
11	November 1, 2003	1–1 OT	@ Nashville Predators (2003–04)	6–4–1–0	T
12	November 2, 2003	7–3	Nashville Predators (2003–04)	7–4–1–0	W
13	November 4, 2003	0–3	@ New York Rangers (2003–04)	7–5–1–0	L
14	November 6, 2003	1–4	@ New York Islanders (2003–04)	7–6–1–0	L
15	November 8, 2003	1–4	@ Boston Bruins (2003–04)	7–7–1–0	L
16	November 12, 2003	2–6	Detroit Red Wings (2003–04)	7–8–1–0	L
17	November 14, 2003	3–3 OT	Phoenix Coyotes (2003–04)	7–8–2–0	T
18	November 15, 2003	0–3	@ Colorado Avalanche (2003–04)	7–9–2–0	L
19	November 19, 2003	3–3 OT	Mighty Ducks of Anaheim (2003–04)	7–9–3–0	T
20	November 21, 2003	3–1	Los Angeles Kings (2003–04)	8–9–3–0	W
21	November 22, 2003	1–2	@ St. Louis Blues (2003–04)	8–10–3–0	L
22	November 24, 2003	5–2	Phoenix Coyotes (2003–04)	9–10–3–0	W
23	November 26, 2003	3–1	@ Minnesota Wild (2003–04)	10–10–3–0	W
24	November 28, 2003	2–0	New Jersey Devils (2003–04)	11–10–3–0	W
25	November 30, 2003	1–2	Los Angeles Kings (2003–04)	11–11–3–0	L

December: 6–5–3–0 (home: 3–0–2–0; road: 3–5–1–0)

Game	Date	Score	Opponent	Record	Recap
26	December 4, 2003	0–3	@ Los Angeles Kings (2003–04)	11–12–3–0	L
27	December 6, 2003	1–2	@ San Jose Sharks (2003–04)	11–13–3–0	L
28	December 7, 2003	0–4	@ Mighty Ducks of Anaheim (2003–04)	11–14–3–0	L
29	December 10, 2003	1–2	@ Phoenix Coyotes (2003–04)	11–15–3–0	L
30	December 12, 2003	1–0	Chicago Blackhawks (2003–04)	12–15–3–0	W
31	December 14, 2003	1–1 OT	@ Chicago Blackhawks (2003–04)	12–15–4–0	T
32	December 17, 2003	3–1	Vancouver Canucks (2003–04)	13–15–4–0	W
33	December 19, 2003	0–1	@ Florida Panthers (2003–04)	13–16–4–0	L
34	December 20, 2003	2–1	@ Tampa Bay Lightning (2003–04)	14–16–4–0	W
35	December 22, 2003	3–1	@ Carolina Hurricanes (2003–04)	15–16–4–0	W
36	December 26, 2003	2–1	Nashville Predators (2003–04)	16–16–4–0	W
37	December 27, 2003	4–3	@ Columbus Blue Jackets (2003–04)	17–16–4–0	W
38	December 29, 2003	2–2 OT	Philadelphia Flyers (2003–04)	17–16–5–0	T
39	December 31, 2003	1–1 OT	Montreal Canadiens (2003–04)	17–16–6–0	T

January: 9–4–3–0 (home: 4–2–1–0; road: 5–2–2–0)

Game	Date	Score	Opponent	Record	Recap
40	January 2, 2004	0–6	Phoenix Coyotes (2003–04)	17–17–6–0	L
41	January 3, 2004	2–2 OT	@ Los Angeles Kings (2003–04)	17–17–7–0	T
42	January 5, 2004	2–2 OT	@ Mighty Ducks of Anaheim (2003–04)	17–17–8–0	T
43	January 8, 2004	2–1	Atlanta Thrashers (2003–04)	18–17–8–0	W
44	January 10, 2004	2–4	Colorado Avalanche (2003–04)	18–18–8–0	L
45	January 13, 2004	3–0	@ San Jose Sharks (2003–04)	19–18–8–0	W
46	January 15, 2004	1–4	@ Colorado Avalanche (2003–04)	19–19–8–0	L
47	January 17, 2004	3–2	@ Calgary Flames (2003–04)	20–19–8–0	W
48	January 19, 2004	3–2	@ Vancouver Canucks (2003–04)	21–19–8–0	W
49	January 20, 2004	0–3	@ Edmonton Oilers (2003–04)	21–20–8–0	L
50	January 23, 2004	2–0	St. Louis Blues (2003–04)	22–20–8–0	W
51	January 24, 2004	3–2	@ St. Louis Blues (2003–04)	23–20–8–0	W
52	January 26, 2004	2–2 OT	Detroit Red Wings (2003–04)	23–20–9–0	T
53	January 28, 2004	5–3	Ottawa Senators (2003–04)	24–20–9–0	W
54	January 30, 2004	3–1	San Jose Sharks (2003–04)	25–20–9–0	W
55	January 31, 2004	5–4	@ Phoenix Coyotes (2003–04)	26–20–9–0	W

February: 6–2–2–0 (home: 5–0–2–0; road: 1–2–0–0)

Game	Date	Score	Opponent	Record	Recap
56	February 4, 2004	1–0	Columbus Blue Jackets (2003–04)	27–20–9–0	W
57	February 11, 2004	4–4 OT	New York Islanders (2003–04)	27–20–10–0	T
58	February 14, 2004	2–3	@ Phoenix Coyotes (2003–04)	27–21–10–0	L
59	February 16, 2004	1–3	@ Mighty Ducks of Anaheim (2003–04)	27–22–10–0	L
60	February 18, 2004	4–3	@ Los Angeles Kings (2003–04)	28–22–10–0	W
61	February 20, 2004	5–1	Colorado Avalanche (2003–04)	29–22–10–0	W
62	February 22, 2004	4–0	Mighty Ducks of Anaheim (2003–04)	30–22–10–0	W
63	February 25, 2004	1–1 OT	Los Angeles Kings (2003–04)	30–22–11–0	T
64	February 27, 2004	3–1	Minnesota Wild (2003–04)	31–22–11–0	W
65	February 29, 2004	5–4 OT	Edmonton Oilers (2003–04)	32–22–11–0	W

March: 8–3–2–2 (home: 5–1–1–0; road: 3–2–1–2)

Game	Date	Score	Opponent	Record	Recap
66	March 3, 2004	4–2	Columbus Blue Jackets (2003–04)	33–22–11–0	W
67	March 5, 2004	5–1	Calgary Flames (2003–04)	34–22–11–0	W
68	March 7, 2004	4–0	San Jose Sharks (2003–04)	35–22–11–0	W
69	March 9, 2004	0–4	@ Pittsburgh Penguins (2003–04)	35–23–11–0	L
70	March 11, 2004	2–2 OT	@ Philadelphia Flyers (2003–04)	35–23–12–0	T
71	March 13, 2004	0–3	@ Detroit Red Wings (2003–04)	35–24–12–0	L
72	March 14, 2004	4–0	@ Chicago Blackhawks (2003–04)	36–24–12–0	W
73	March 16, 2004	3–3 OT	San Jose Sharks (2003–04)	36–24–13–0	T
74	March 18, 2004	3–0	Vancouver Canucks (2003–04)	37–24–13–0	W
75	March 20, 2004	3–1	St. Louis Blues (2003–04)	38–24–13–0	W
76	March 22, 2004	4–0	@ Calgary Flames (2003–04)	39–24–13–0	W
77	March 24, 2004	4–3 OT	@ Edmonton Oilers (2003–04)	40–24–13–0	W
78	March 27, 2004	2–3 OT	@ Vancouver Canucks (2003–04)	40–24–13–1	OTL
79	March 28, 2004	1–2 OT	@ San Jose Sharks (2003–04)	40–24–13–2	OTL
80	March 31, 2004	1–3	Edmonton Oilers (2003–04)	40–25–13–2	L

April: 1–1–0–0 (home: 1–0–0–0; road: 0–1–0–0)

Game	Date	Score	Opponent	Record	Recap
81	April 2, 2004	2–4	@ Minnesota Wild (2003–04)	40–26–13–2	L
82	April 4, 2004	5–2	Chicago Blackhawks (2003–04)	41–26–13–2	W

Legend: W Win (2 points) L Loss (0 points) T Tie (1 point) OTL Overtime loss (1 point)

=== Playoffs ===
2004 Stanley Cup playoffs
Western Conference Quarterfinals vs. (4) Colorado Avalanche: Avalanche win 4–1

Game	Date	Visitor	Score	Home	OT	Decision	Attendance	Series	Recap
1	April 7	Dallas	1–3	Colorado		Turco	18,007	Avalanche lead 1–0	L
2	April 9	Dallas	2–5	Colorado		Turco	18,007	Avalanche lead 2–0	L
3	April 12	Colorado	3–4	Dallas	OT	Turco	18,532	Avalanche lead 2–1	W
4	April 14	Colorado	3–2	Dallas	2OT	Turco	18,532	Avalanche lead 3–1	L
5	April 17	Dallas	1–5	Colorado		Turco	18,007	Avalanche win 4–1	L

Legend: W Win L Loss

== Player statistics ==
=== Scoring ===
- Position abbreviations: C = Center; D = Defense; G = Goaltender; LW = Left wing; RW = Right wing
- † = Joined team via a transaction (e.g., trade, waivers, signing) during the season. Stats reflect time with the Stars only.
- ‡ = Left team via a transaction (e.g., trade, waivers, release) during the season. Stats reflect time with the Stars only.

No.	Player	Pos	Regular season						Playoffs					
No.	Player	Pos	GP	G	A	Pts	+/-	PIM	GP	G	A	Pts	+/-	PIM
13	Bill Guerin	RW	82	34	35	69	14	109	5	0	1	1	−1	4
44	Jason Arnott	C	73	21	36	57	23	66	5	1	1	2	−1	2
10	Brenden Morrow	LW	81	25	24	49	10	121	5	0	1	1	0	4
9	Mike Modano	C	76	14	30	44	−21	46	5	1	2	3	−4	8
56	Sergei Zubov	D	77	7	35	42	0	20	5	1	1	2	−5	0
77	Pierre Turgeon	C	76	15	25	40	17	20	5	1	3	4	−2	2
14	Stu Barnes	C	77	11	18	29	7	18	5	0	0	0	−6	0
26	Jere Lehtinen	RW	58	13	13	26	0	20	5	0	0	0	−4	0
18	Rob DiMaio	RW	69	9	15	24	2	52	5	0	1	1	−2	2
43	Philippe Boucher	D	70	8	16	24	15	64	5	1	0	1	−1	6
24	Richard Matvichuk	D	75	1	20	21	0	36	5	0	1	1	−4	8
27	Teppo Numminen	D	62	3	14	17	−5	18	4	0	1	1	−1	0
48	Scott Young	RW	53	8	8	16	−15	14	4	1	0	1	1	2
28	David Oliver	RW	36	7	5	12	6	12	1	0	0	0	0	0
29	Steve Ott	C	73	2	10	12	−2	152	4	1	0	1	0	0
32	Don Sweeney	D	63	0	11	11	22	18	5	0	0	0	−2	2
72	Shayne Corson†	LW	17	5	5	10	12	29	5	0	1	1	−5	12
17	Valeri Bure†	RW	13	2	5	7	3	6	5	0	3	3	−1	0
42	Jon Klemm†	D	58	2	4	6	10	24	—	—	—	—	—	—
5 (Note: Daley originally wore number 6 prior to Therien being acquired.)	Trevor Daley	D	27	1	5	6	−6	14	1	0	0	0	0	0
39	Niko Kapanen	C	67	1	5	6	−15	16	1	1	0	1	0	0
47	Aaron Downey	RW	37	1	1	2	2	77	—	—	—	—	—	—
37	Lubomir Sekeras†	D	4	1	1	2	0	2	—	—	—	—	—	—
23	Mathias Tjarnqvist	RW	18	1	1	2	−6	2	—	—	—	—	—	—
20	Antti Miettinen	RW	16	1	0	1	−9	0	—	—	—	—	—	—
17	Stephane Robidas‡	D	14	1	0	1	−2	8	—	—	—	—	—	—
55	John Erskine	D	32	0	1	1	−9	84	—	—	—	—	—	—
35	Marty Turco	G	73	0	1	1		32	5	0	0	0		0
1	Dan Ellis	G	1	0	0	0		0	—	—	—	—	—	—
36	Steve Gainey‡	LW	7	0	0	0	1	7	—	—	—	—	—	—
37	Jeff MacMillan	D	4	0	0	0	−2	0	—	—	—	—	—	—
16	Manny Malhotra‡	C	9	0	0	0	−2	4	—	—	—	—	—	—
40	Gavin Morgan	C	6	0	0	0	0	21	—	—	—	—	—	—
16	Blake Sloan†	RW	28	0	0	0	−1	7	—	—	—	—	—	—
6	Chris Therien†	D	11	0	0	0	4	2	5	2	0	2	1	0
31	Ron Tugnutt	G	11	0	0	0		0	—	—	—	—	—	—
11	Rob Valicevic	RW	7	0	0	0	−1	2	—	—	—	—	—	—

=== Goaltending ===
No.	Player	Regular season										Playoffs								
No.	Player	GP	W	L	T	SA	GA	GAA	SV%	SO	TOI	GP	W	L	SA	GA	GAA	SV%	SO	TOI
35	Marty Turco	73	37	21	13	1648	144	1.98	.913	9	4359	5	1	4	119	18	3.32	.849	0	325
31	Ron Tugnutt	11	3	7	0	220	22	2.41	.900	1	548	—	—	—	—	—	—	—	—	—
1	Dan Ellis	1	1	0	0	28	3	3.00	.893	0	60	—	—	—	—	—	—	—	—	—

== Awards and records ==
=== Awards ===
Type	Award/honor	Recipient	Ref
League (in-season)	NHL All-Star Game selection	Bill Guerin (Note: Guerin, Modano, and Turco were all voted to the starting lineup.)	
League (in-season)	NHL All-Star Game selection	Mike Modano	
League (in-season)	NHL All-Star Game selection	Marty Turco	
League (in-season)	NHL Offensive Player of the Week	Bill Guerin (November 3)	
Team	Star of the Game Award	Brenden Morrow	

=== Milestones ===
Milestone	Player	Date	Ref
First game	Antti Miettinen	October 8, 2003	
First game	Trevor Daley	October 25, 2003	
First game	Mathias Tjarnqvist	November 12, 2003	
First game	Gavin Morgan	December 4, 2003	
First game	Jeff MacMillan	December 7, 2003	
First game	Dan Ellis	February 18, 2004	

== Transactions ==
The Stars were involved in the following transactions from June 10, 2003, the day after the deciding game of the 2003 Stanley Cup Finals, through June 7, 2004, the day of the deciding game of the 2004 Stanley Cup Finals.

=== Trades ===
Date	Details		Ref
June 21, 2003	To Anaheim Mighty Ducks: 1st-round pick in 2003	To Dallas Stars: 2nd-round pick in 2003; San Jose’s 2nd-round pick in 2003	
June 22, 2003	To Phoenix Coyotes: 9th-round pick in 2003	To Dallas Stars: 8th-round pick in 2004	
July 22, 2003	To Columbus Blue Jackets: Darryl Sydor	To Dallas Stars: Mike Sillinger; 2nd-round pick in 2004	
July 22, 2003	To Phoenix Coyotes: Mike Sillinger; Conditional draft pick	To Dallas Stars: Teppo Numminen	
November 17, 2003	To Chicago Blackhawks: Stephane Robidas; 2nd-round pick in 2004	To Dallas Stars: Jon Klemm; 4th-round pick in 2004	
February 16, 2004	To Philadelphia Flyers: Steve Gainey	To Dallas Stars: Mike Siklenka	
March 8, 2004	To Philadelphia Flyers: Phoenix’s 8th-round pick in 2004; 3rd-round pick in 2005	To Dallas Stars: Chris Therien	
March 8, 2004	To Florida Panthers: Rights to Drew Bagnall; 2nd-round pick in 2004	To Dallas Stars: Valeri Bure	

=== Players acquired ===
Date	Player	Former team	Term	Via	Ref
July 14, 2003	Don Sweeney	Boston Bruins	1-year	Free agency	
July 17, 2003	Jarrod Skalde	Lausanne HC (NLA)	1-year	Free agency	
August 28, 2003	Rob Valicevic	Anaheim Mighty Ducks	1-year	Free agency	
December 3, 2003	Blake Sloan	Detroit Red Wings		Waivers	
February 18, 2004	Shayne Corson	Toronto Maple Leafs	1-year	Free agency	
March 9, 2004	Lubomir Sekeras	Sodertalje SK (SHL)	1-year	Free agency	
April 16, 2004	Junior Lessard	University of Minnesota Duluth (WCHA)	1-year	Free agency	

=== Players lost ===
Date	Player	New team	Via (Note: In parentheses is the player's free agency group on July 1 if applicable.)	Ref
July 3, 2003	Derian Hatcher	Detroit Red Wings	Free agency (III)	
July 3, 2003	Alexei Komarov	HC Spartak Moscow (RUS-2)	Free agency (II) (Note: Dallas retained Komarov’s NHL rights through the 2006–07 season.)	
August 23, 2003	Jim Montgomery	Salavat Yulaev Ufa (RSL)	Free agency (UFA)	
August 25, 2003	Greg Hawgood	Chicago Wolves (AHL)	Free agency (III)	
September 1, 2003	David Gosselin	Frankfurt Lions (DEL)	Free agency (VI)	
September 2, 2003	Kirk Muller		Retirement (III)	
September 9, 2003	Lyle Odelein	Florida Panthers	Free agency (III)	
September 21, 2003	Ulf Dahlen		Retirement (III)	
October 7, 2003	Claude Lemieux	EV Zug (NLA) (Note: Lemieux signed with EV Zug on February 9, 2004.)	Buyout	
October 14, 2003	Marcus Kristoffersson	Djurgardens IF (SHL)	Free agency	
November 21, 2003	Manny Malhotra	Columbus Blue Jackets	Waivers	
December 16, 2003	Corey Hirsch	Timra IK (SHL)	Free agency (UFA)	

=== Signings ===
Date	Player	Term	Contract type	Ref
June 26, 2003	Aaron Downey	1-year	Option exercised	
July 15, 2003	Antti Miettinen	2-year	Entry-level	
July 15, 2003	Mathias Tjarnqvist	1-year	Entry-level	
July 17, 2003	Andrew Berenzweig	1-year	Re-signing	
July 17, 2003	Jeff MacMillan	1-year	Re-signing	
July 17, 2003	David Oliver	1-year	Re-signing	
July 24, 2003	Stephane Robidas	1-year	Re-signing	
July 30, 2003	John Erskine	1-year	Re-signing	
August 14, 2003	Richard Matvichuk	1-year	Arbitration award	
August 18, 2003	Dan Ellis	3-year	Entry-level	
August 26, 2003	Niko Kapanen	1-year	Re-signing	
August 27, 2003	Mike Modano	1-year	Extension	
September 4, 2003	Jere Lehtinen	4-year	Extension	
September 15, 2003	Steve Gainey	1-year	Re-signing	
September 15, 2003	Marcus Kristoffersson	1-year	Re-signing	
September 18, 2003	Marty Turco	3-year	Re-signing	
May 3, 2004	Matt Nickerson	3-year	Entry-level	
May 21, 2004	Marius Holtet	3-year	Entry-level	

== Draft picks ==
Dallas's draft picks at the 2003 NHL entry draft held at the Gaylord Entertainment Center in Nashville, Tennessee.

Round	#	Player	Nationality	College/Junior/Club team (League)
2	33	Loui Eriksson	Sweden	Frölunda HC (Sweden)
2	36	Vojtech Polak	Czech Republic	Energie Karlovy Vary (Czech Republic)
2	54	B. J. Crombeen	United States	Barrie Colts (OHL)
3	99	Matt Nickerson	United States	Texas Tornado (NAHL)
4	134	Alexander Naurov	Russia	Lokomotiv Yaroslavl (Russia)
5	144	Eero Kilpelainen	Finland	KalPa (Finland)
5	165	Gino Guyer	United States	University of Minnesota (NCAA)
6	185	Francis Wathier	Canada	Hull Olympiques (QMJHL)
6	195	Drew Bagnall	Canada	Battlefords North Stars (SJHL)
6	196	Elias Granath	Sweden	Leksands IF (Sweden)
8	259	Niko Vainio	Finland	Jokerit (Finland)
