= 2003–04 Detroit Red Wings season =

Sports season

2003–04 Detroit Red Wings
- Presidents' Trophy winners
- Central Division champions
- Division: 1st Central
- Conference: 1st Western
- 2003–04 record: 48–21–11–2
- Home record: 30–7–4–0
- Road record: 18–14–7–2
- Goals for: 255
- Goals against: 189

Team information
- General manager: Ken Holland
- Coach: Dave Lewis
- Captain: Steve Yzerman
- Alternate captains: Nicklas Lidstrom; Brendan Shanahan
- Arena: Joe Louis Arena
- Average attendance: 20,066 (100%)
- Minor league affiliates: Grand Rapids Griffins; Toledo Storm

Team leaders
- Goals: Pavel Datsyuk (30)
- Assists: Brett Hull (43)
- Points: Pavel Datsyuk (68)
- Penalty minutes: Brendan Shanahan (108)
- Plus/minus: Kirk Maltby (24)
- Wins: Manny Legace (23)
- Goals against average: Marc Lamothe (1.45)

The 2003–04 Detroit Red Wings season was the 78th National Hockey League season in Detroit, Michigan. Despite multiple injuries to key players, the Wings found themselves once again winning the Presidents' Trophy for having the best regular season record in the NHL, scoring 109 points. In the post-season, they advanced to the Western Conference Semifinals, where they were eliminated by the eventual Western Conference champion Calgary Flames in six games.

Two Red Wings were named to the roster for the 2004 All-Star Game: defenseman Nicklas Lidstrom and center Pavel Datsyuk. Lidstrom was voted into his eighth appearance at the All-Star game by fans, and Datsyuk was selected to the roster for his first appearance.

The Red Wings sold out all 41 home games in 2003–04 as 20,066 fans packed Joe Louis Arena for every regular season and playoff game played in Detroit.

== Goaltending controversy ==
Detroit's early exit from the 2003 Stanley Cup playoffs left Curtis Joseph to be heavily scrutinized by the media as to whether or not he was up to task to start for Detroit. During the subsequent offseason, Dominik Hasek shocked the hockey world when he announced he was coming out of retirement and fulfilling his contractual obligation to the Red Wings. Given their previous success with Hasek, the Red Wings welcomed him back to the team.

With the Wings appearing to favor Hasek as their starting goaltender, Joseph opted to have surgery to repair his ankle prior to the start of the season, resulting with the Red Wings using Hasek and Manny Legace as their goaltending tandem. When Joseph returned from injury and subsequent conditioning assignment in the minors, anger quickly grew on and off the ice between Hasek and Joseph. General Manager Ken Holland attempted to move Joseph to alleviate the situation, but Holland was not able to find a trade partner nor give Joseph up via the waiver wire due to the hefty terms of his contract (the contract had two years remaining with an annual salary of US$8 million and a no-trade clause). Unable to continue holding three goaltenders on roster, Detroit elected to send Joseph to Detroit's minor league affiliate, the Grand Rapids Griffins, on a permanent basis following a poor performance against the Washington Capitals.

While Hasek assumed the starting role, he did not do so with ease. Hasek was not conditioned properly to handle the competition at the NHL level and was wrought with inconsistent play and injuries. By December 2003, both Hasek and Legace went down with injuries and Joseph was recalled from the minors, along with Joey MacDonald. While MacDonald was returned to the minors when Legace returned from injury, Joseph remained with the Red Wings as Hasek opted to remain on the injured reserve and did not return for the remainder of the season.

Joseph and Legace would find themselves in a platoon situation until Joseph injured his ankle in a contest against the San Jose Sharks. The Red Wings recalled Marc Lamothe from the Griffins to support Legace. Lamothe would appear in two games during his time with Detroit, making him the fifth goaltender to dress for Detroit and the fourth to play for them that season (MacDonald did not play in any games while on roster). Lamothe was returned to the minors once Joseph returned from injury.

Despite being viewed by many as Detroit's "third" goaltender, Manny Legace ended up the de facto starting goaltender for the season, leading the other goaltenders on the team in games played, wins and shutouts. (At the time, those were also career records for Legace.) Legace also had a better save percentage and goals against average (GAA) than either Hasek or Joseph. Based on his regular season play, Legace was named the starting goaltender going into the playoffs. During the opening round against the Nashville Predators, Legace won the first two games, but was pulled after the fourth game following consecutive three-goal losses.

Joseph took over the starting duties and responded admirably, posting a .300 GAA, .977 save percentage and one shutout for the remainder of the series. While Joseph had a strong performance against Calgary (1.83 GAA and .928 SV%), Detroit suffered an offensive drought and, with the series tied at two games a piece, were shut-out the final two games of the series, eliminating Detroit from the playoffs.

Joseph never appeared for the Red Wings again, as the last year of his contract was nullified by the 2004–05 NHL lockout. Instead, Joseph signed with the Phoenix Coyotes once the lockout was resolved. Legace went on to assume the starting role for Detroit, but was released after the season following another disappointing playoff exit. Hasek appeared with the Ottawa Senators during the 2005–06 season, but later returned to Detroit for what would be his last two seasons as an NHL goaltender.

== Regular season ==
The Red Wings tied the Tampa Bay Lightning for most short-handed goals scored in the NHL, with 15, and had the best penalty-kill percentage in the League (86.75%).

=== Season standings ===
Central Division
No.	CR		GP	W	L	T	OTL	GF	GA	Pts
1	1	**Detroit Red Wings**	82	48	21	11	2	255	189	109
2	7	**St. Louis Blues**	82	39	30	11	2	191	198	91
3	8	**Nashville Predators**	82	38	29	11	4	216	217	91
4	14	Columbus Blue Jackets	82	25	45	8	4	177	238	62
5	15	Chicago Blackhawks	82	20	43	11	8	188	259	59

Note: CR = Conference rank; GP = Games played; W = Wins; L = Losses; T = Ties; OTL = Overtime loss; GF = Goals for; GA = Goals against; Pts = Points
Bolded teams qualified for the playoffs.

Western Conference
R		Div	GP	W	L	T	OTL	GF	GA	Pts
**1**	**P-** Detroit Red Wings	**CE**	**82**	**48**	**21**	**11**	**2**	**255**	**189**	109
**2**	**Y-** San Jose Sharks	**PA**	**82**	**43**	**21**	**12**	**6**	**255**	**183**	104
**3**	**Y-** Vancouver Canucks	**NW**	**82**	**43**	**24**	**10**	**5**	**235**	**194**	101
**4**	**X-** Colorado Avalanche	**NW**	**82**	**40**	**22**	**13**	**7**	**236**	**198**	100
**5**	**X-** Dallas Stars	**PA**	**82**	**41**	**26**	**13**	**2**	**194**	**175**	97
**6**	**X-** Calgary Flames	**NW**	**82**	**42**	**30**	**7**	**3**	**200**	**176**	94
**7**	**X-** St. Louis Blues	**CE**	**82**	**39**	**30**	**11**	**2**	**191**	**198**	91
**8**	**X-** Nashville Predators	**CE**	**82**	**38**	**29**	**11**	**4**	**216**	**217**	91
8.5
9	Edmonton Oilers	NW	82	36	29	12	5	221	208	89
10	Minnesota Wild	NW	82	30	29	20	3	188	183	83
11	Los Angeles Kings	PA	82	28	29	16	9	205	217	81
12	Mighty Ducks of Anaheim	PA	82	29	35	10	8	184	213	76
13	Phoenix Coyotes	PA	82	22	36	18	6	188	245	68
14	Columbus Blue Jackets	CE	82	25	45	8	4	177	238	62
15	Chicago Blackhawks	CE	82	20	43	11	8	188	259	59

Divisions: CE – Central, PA – Pacific, NW – Northwest

P – Clinched Presidents Trophy; Y – Clinched division; X – Clinched playoff spot For complete final standings, see 2003–04 NHL season

== Playoffs ==
The Detroit Red Wings ended the 2003–04 regular season as the Western Conference's first seed and played the Nashville Predators in the first round. They defeated Nashville in six games and met the Calgary Flames in the second round. Calgary would go on to defeat Detroit and reach the Stanley Cup Finals, losing in Game 7 to the Tampa Bay Lightning.

== Schedule and results ==
=== Regular season ===
2003–04 regular season
October: 5–5–0–0 (home: 4–1–0–0; road: 1–4–0–0)

Game	Date	Visitor	Score	Home	OT	Decision	Attendance	Record	Pts	Recap
1	October 9	Los Angeles	2 – 3	Detroit		Hasek	20,066	1–0–0–0	2	W
2	October 11	Detroit	3 – 2	Ottawa	OT	Hasek	18,500	2–0–0–0	4	W
3	October 16	Vancouver	2 – 3	Detroit		Hasek	20,066	3–0–0–0	6	W
4	October 18	Detroit	3 – 4	Pittsburgh		Hasek	13,421	3–1–0–0	6	L
5	October 20	Detroit	1 – 2	Montreal		Hasek	19,407	3–2–0–0	6	L
6	October 22	Columbus	1 – 4	Detroit		Legace	20,066	4–2–0–0	8	W
7	October 24	Dallas	0 – 4	Detroit		Hasek	20,066	5–2–0–0	10	W
8	October 25	Detroit	1 – 3	NY Rangers		Hasek	18,200	5–3–0–0	10	L
9	October 29	St. Louis	6 – 5	Detroit		Legace	20,066	5–4–0–0	10	L
10	October 30	Detroit	3 – 5	Nashville		Joseph	12,322	5–5–0–0	10	L

November: 9–4–2–0 (home: 4–2–0–0; road: 5–2–2–0)

Game	Date	Visitor	Score	Home	OT	Decision	Attendance	Record	Pts	Recap
11	November 1	Detroit	4 – 4	Edmonton	OT	Legace	16,839	5–5–1–0	11	T
12	November 3	Detroit	1 – 5	Vancouver		Legace	18,630	5–6–1–0	11	L
13	November 4	Detroit	3 – 0	Calgary		Joseph	15,259	6–6–1–0	13	W
14	November 8	Nashville	4 – 3	Detroit		Joseph	20,066	6–7–1–0	13	L
15	November 10	Chicago	0 – 3	Detroit		Hasek	20,066	7–7–1–0	15	W
16	November 12	Detroit	6 – 2	Dallas		Hasek	18,532	8–7–1–0	17	W
17	November 14	Detroit	4 – 3	Chicago	OT	Hasek	21,856	9–7–1–0	19	W
18	November 15	Detroit	1 – 1	Minnesota	OT	Hasek	18,568	9–7–2–0	20	T
19	November 19	Columbus	1 – 5	Detroit		Legace	20,066	10–7–2–0	22	W
20	November 20	Detroit	0 – 3	Columbus		Legace	18,136	10–8–2–0	22	L
21	November 22	Detroit	5 – 2	Minnesota		Joseph	18,568	11–8–2–0	24	W
22	November 24	Washington	4 – 1	Detroit		Joseph	20,066	11–9–2–0	24	L
23	November 26	Edmonton	1 – 7	Detroit		Legace	20,066	12–9–2–0	26	W
24	November 28	NY Islanders	0 – 6	Detroit		Legace	20,066	13–9–2–0	28	W
25	November 29	Detroit	2 – 1	St. Louis		Legace	20,006	14–9–2–0	30	W

December: 9–3–2–1 (home: 7–0–1–0; road: 2–3–1–1)

Game	Date	Visitor	Score	Home	OT	Decision	Attendance	Record	Pts	Recap
26	December 3	Anaheim	2 – 7	Detroit		Legace	20,066	15–9–2–0	32	W
27	December 4	Detroit	4 – 4	St. Louis	OT	Hasek	18,504	15–9–3–0	33	T
28	December 6	Detroit	2 – 5	Toronto		Legace	19,470	15–10–3–0	33	L
29	December 8	Los Angeles	2 – 3	Detroit	OT	Hasek	20,066	16–10–3–0	35	W
30	December 10	Detroit	7 – 2	Buffalo		Joseph	16,283	17–10–3–0	37	W
31	December 11	Detroit	3 – 4	Chicago	OT	Joseph	18,489	17–10–3–1	38	OTL
32	December 13	Detroit	5 – 1	Washington		Joseph	18,277	18–10–3–1	40	W
33	December 15	Florida	1 – 4	Detroit		Joseph	20,066	19–10–3–1	42	W
34	December 17	San Jose	2 – 2	Detroit	OT	Joseph	20,066	20–10–3–1	44	W
35	December 19	Chicago	2 – 3	Detroit		Legace	20,066	21–10–3–1	46	W
36	December 20	Detroit	0 – 1	Nashville		Joseph	17,113	21–11–3–1	46	L
37	December 22	St. Louis	1 – 2	Detroit		Joseph	20,066	22–11–3–1	48	W
38	December 26	Minnesota	2 – 2	Detroit	OT	Joseph	20,066	22–11–4–1	49	T
39	December 28	Detroit	0 – 3	Chicago		Legace	21,122	22–12–4–1	49	L
40	December 31	Atlanta	5 – 6	Detroit	OT	Joseph	20,066	23–12–4–1	51	W

January: 6–3–4–1 (home: 4–1–2–0; road: 2–2–2–1)

Game	Date	Visitor	Score	Home	OT	Decision	Attendance	Record	Pts	Recap
41	January 2	Detroit	4 – 1	Carolina		Joseph	17,053	24–12–4–1	53	W
42	January 3	Anaheim	1 – 3	Detroit		Legace	20,066	25–12–4–1	55	W
43	January 5	Nashville	0 – 6	Detroit		Joseph	20,066	26–12–4–1	57	W
44	January 7	Boston	3 – 0	Detroit		Joseph	20,066	26–13–4–1	57	L
45	January 10	Detroit	1 – 2	Boston	OT	Joseph	17,565	26–13–4–2	58	OTL
46	January 14	Chicago	2 – 4	Detroit		Legace	20,066	27–13–4–2	60	W
47	January 16	Phoenix	3 – 3	Detroit	OT	Joseph	20,066	27–13–5–2	61	T
48	January 19	Detroit	1 – 2	San Jose		Joseph	17,361	27–14–5–2	61	L
49	January 21	Detroit	2 – 2	Anaheim	OT	Legace	17,174	27–14–6–2	62	T
50	January 22	Detroit	5 – 4	Los Angeles		Joseph	18,118	28–14–6–2	64	W
51	January 24	Detroit	2 – 5	Phoenix		Joseph	19,019	28–15–6–2	64	L
52	January 26	Detroit	2 – 2	Dallas	OT	Legace	18,532	28–15–7–2	65	T
53	January 29	New Jersey	2 – 5	Detroit		Joseph	20,066	29–15–7–2	67	W
54	January 31	Carolina	4 – 4	Detroit	OT	Legace	20,066	30–15–8–2	68	T

February: 8–2–1–0 (home: 5–1–0–0; road: 3–1–1–0)

Game	Date	Visitor	Score	Home	OT	Decision	Attendance	Record	Pts	Recap
55	February 3	Detroit	4 – 1	Nashville		Legace	15,134	30–15–8–2	70	W
56	February 5	Detroit	3 – 2	Colorado	OT	Joseph	18,007	31–15–8–2	72	W
57	February 11	San Jose	2 – 4	Detroit		Legace	20,066	32–15–8–2	74	W
58	February 14	Colorado	5 – 2	Detroit		Legace	20,066	32–16–8–2	74	L
59	February 16	Edmonton	1 – 2	Detroit		Legace	20,066	33–16–8–2	76	W
60	February 18	Phoenix	2 – 5	Detroit		Legace	20,066	34–16–8–2	78	W
61	February 20	St. Louis	1 – 5	Detroit		Legace	20,066	35–16–8–2	80	W
62	February 23	Detroit	1 – 1	Edmonton	OT	Lamothe	16,839	35–16–9–2	81	T
63	February 24	Detroit	2 – 4	Vancouver		Legace	18,630	35–17–9–2	81	L
64	February 26	Detroit	2 – 1	Calgary		Legace	17,862	36–17–9–2	83	W
65	February 29	Philadelphia	2 – 4	Detroit		Legace	20,066	37–17–9–2	85	W

March: 10–3–2–0 (home: 6–1–1–0; road: 4–2–1–0)

Game	Date	Visitor	Score	Home	OT	Decision	Attendance	Record	Pts	Recap
66	March 3	Calgary	1 – 2	Detroit		Legace	20,066	38–17–9–2	87	W
67	March 5	Vancouver	1 – 3	Detroit		Legace	20,066	39–17–9–2	89	W
68	March 8	Tampa Bay	1 – 1	Detroit	OT	Legace	20,066	39–17–10–2	90	T
69	March 11	Detroit	4 – 2	Columbus		Joseph	18,136	40–17–10–2	92	W
70	March 13	Dallas	0 – 3	Detroit		Legace	20,066	41–17–10–2	94	W
71	March 14	Nashville	2 – 3	Detroit	OT	Joseph	20,066	42–17–10–2	96	W
72	March 16	Calgary	4 – 1	Detroit		Legace	20,066	42–18–10–2	96	L
73	March 18	Detroit	1 – 1	Phoenix	OT	Joseph	18,704	42–18–11–2	97	T
74	March 20	Detroit	4 – 2	Los Angeles		Joseph	18,118	43–18–11–2	99	W
75	March 21	Detroit	6 – 8	Anaheim		Joseph	17,174	43–19–11–2	99	L
76	March 23	Detroit	2 – 5	San Jose		Legace	17,496	43–20–11–2	99	L
77	March 25	Detroit	3 – 1	Colorado		Legace	18,007	44–20–11–2	101	W
78	March 27	Colorado	0 – 2	Detroit		Legace	20,066	45–20–11–2	103	W
79	March 29	Minnesota	3 – 5	Detroit		Legace	20,066	46–20–11–2	105	W
80	March 31	Detroit	3 – 2	Columbus		Legace	18,136	47–20–11–2	107	W

April: 1–1–0–0 (home: 0–1–0–0; road: 1–0–0–0)

Game	Date	Visitor	Score	Home	OT	Decision	Attendance	Record	Pts	Recap
81	April 1	Detroit	3 – 2	St. Louis		Lamothe	20,018	48–20–11–2	109	W
82	April 3	Columbus	4 – 1	Detroit		Legace	20,066	48–21–11–2	109	L

Legend: W Win (2 points) L Loss (0 points) T Tie (1 point) OTL Overtime loss (1 point)

=== Playoffs ===
2004 Stanley Cup playoffs
Western Conference Quarterfinals: vs. (8) Nashville Predators — Detroit wins 4–2

Game	Date	Visitor	Score	Home	OT	Decision	Attendance	Series	Recap
1	April 7	Nashville	1–3	Detroit		Legace	20,066	Red Wings lead 1–0	W
2	April 10	Nashville	1–2	Detroit		Legace	20,066	Red Wings lead 2–0	W
3	April 11	Detroit	1–3	Nashville		Legace	17,113	Red Wings lead 2–1	L
4	April 13	Detroit	0–3	Nashville		Legace	17,113	Series tied 2–2	L
5	April 15	Nashville	1–4	Detroit		Joseph	20,066	Red Wings lead 3–2	W
6	April 17	Detroit	2–0	Nashville		Joseph	17,329	Red Wings win 4–2	W

Western Conference Semifinals: vs. (6) Calgary Flames — Calgary wins 4–2

Game	Date	Visitor	Score	Home	OT	Decision	Attendance	Series	Recap
1	April 22	Calgary	2–1	Detroit	OT	Joseph	20,066	Flames lead 1–0	L
2	April 24	Calgary	2–5	Detroit		Joseph	20,066	Series tied 1–1	W
3	April 27	Detroit	2–3	Calgary		Joseph	19,289	Flames lead 2–1	L
4	April 29	Detroit	4–2	Calgary		Joseph	19,289	Series tied 2–2	W
5	May 1	Calgary	1–0	Detroit		Joseph	20,066	Flames lead 3–2	L
6	May 3	Detroit	0–1	Calgary	OT	Joseph	19,289	Flames win 4–2	L

Legend: W Win L Loss

== Player statistics ==
=== Scoring ===
- Position abbreviations: C = Center; D = Defense; G = Goaltender; LW = Left wing; RW = Right wing
- † = Joined team via a transaction (e.g., trade, waivers, signing) during the season. Stats reflect time with the Red Wings only.

No.	Player	Pos	Regular season						Playoffs					
No.	Player	Pos	GP	G	A	Pts	+/-	PIM	GP	G	A	Pts	+/-	PIM
13	Pavel Datsyuk	C	75	30	38	68	−2	35	12	0	6	6	1	2
17	Brett Hull	RW	81	25	43	68	−4	12	12	3	2	5	0	4
14	Brendan Shanahan	LW	82	25	28	53	15	117	12	1	5	6	4	20
19	Steve Yzerman	C	75	18	33	51	10	46	11	3	2	5	−1	0
23	Mathieu Schneider	D	78	14	32	46	22	56	12	1	2	3	2	8
40	Henrik Zetterberg	LW	61	15	28	43	15	14	12	2	2	4	0	4
41	Ray Whitney	LW	67	14	29	43	7	22	12	1	3	4	−4	4
33	Kris Draper	C	67	24	16	40	22	31	12	1	3	4	1	6
5	Nicklas Lidstrom	D	81	10	28	38	19	18	12	2	5	7	4	4
18	Kirk Maltby	LW	79	14	19	33	24	80	12	1	3	4	2	11
96	Tomas Holmstrom	LW	67	15	15	30	8	38	12	2	2	4	0	10
32	Steve Thomas†	RW	44	10	12	22	8	25	6	0	1	1	1	2
24	Chris Chelios	D	69	2	19	21	12	61	8	0	1	1	1	4
8	Jiri Fischer	D	81	4	15	19	0	75	11	1	0	1	−2	16
15	Jason Woolley	D	55	4	15	19	19	28	6	0	1	1	−4	6
21	Boyd Devereaux	C	61	6	9	15	−1	20	4	0	0	0	−1	0
29	Jason Williams	C	49	6	7	13	1	15	3	0	0	0	0	2
11	Mathieu Dandenault	D	65	3	9	12	9	40	12	1	1	2	−1	6
25	Darren McCarty	RW	43	6	5	11	2	50	12	0	1	1	0	7
44 (Note: Mowers originally wore number 20 prior to Lang being acquired.)	Mark Mowers	RW	52	3	8	11	3	4	—	—	—	—	—	—
4	Jamie Rivers	D	50	3	4	7	9	41	2	0	0	0	0	2
55	Niklas Kronwall	D	20	1	4	5	5	16	—	—	—	—	—	—
20	Robert Lang†	C	6	1	4	5	2	0	12	4	5	9	−1	6
2	Derian Hatcher	D	15	0	4	4	4	8	12	0	1	1	0	15
26	Jiri Hudler	C	12	1	2	3	−1	10	—	—	—	—	—	—
28	Kevin Miller	C	4	0	2	2	2	0	—	—	—	—	—	—
27	Darryl Bootland	RW	22	1	1	2	−3	74	—	—	—	—	—	—
39	Dominik Hasek	G	14	0	2	2		2	—	—	—	—	—	—
22	Anders Myrvold	D	8	0	1	1	−1	2	—	—	—	—	—	—
34	Manny Legace	G	41	0	0	0		0	4	0	1	1		0
31	Curtis Joseph	G	31	0	0	0		2	9	0	0	0		2
38	Nathan Robinson	LW	5	0	0	0	−1	2	—	—	—	—	—	—
52	Ryan Barnes	LW	2	0	0	0	0	0	—	—	—	—	—	—
35	Marc Lamothe	G	2	0	0	0		0	—	—	—	—	—	—

=== Goaltending ===
No.	Player	Regular season										Playoffs								
No.	Player	GP	W	L	T	SA	GA	GAA	SV%	SO	TOI	GP	W	L	SA	GA	GAA	SV%	SO	TOI
34	Manny Legace	41	23	10	5	1019	82	2.12	.920	3	2325	4	2	2	84	8	2.18	.905	0	220
31	Curtis Joseph	31	16	10	3	744	68	2.39	.909	2	1708	9	4	4	197	12	1.39	.939	1	518
39	Dominik Hasek	14	8	3	2	324	30	2.20	.907	2	817	—	—	—	—	—	—	—	—	—
35	Marc Lamothe	2	1	0	1	58	3	1.45	.948	0	125	—	—	—	—	—	—	—	—	—

== Awards and records ==
=== Awards ===
Type	Award/honor	Recipient	Ref
League (annual)	Frank J. Selke Trophy	Kris Draper	
League (in-season)	NHL All-Star Game selection	Pavel Datsyuk	
League (in-season)	NHL All-Star Game selection	Dave Lewis (coach)	
League (in-season)	NHL All-Star Game selection	Nicklas Lidstrom (Note: Lidstrom was voted to the starting lineup.)	
League (in-season)	NHL Offensive Player of the Month	Pavel Datsyuk (December)	
League (in-season)	NHL Offensive Player of the Week	Pavel Datsyuk (December 15)	

=== Milestones ===
Milestone	Player	Date	Ref
First game	Jiri Hudler	October 16, 2003	
First game	Darryl Bootland	November 8, 2003	
First game	Nathan Robinson	November 28, 2003	
First game	Niklas Kronwall	December 10, 2003	
First game	Ryan Barnes	December 15, 2003	
1,000th game played	Nicklas Lidstrom	February 29, 2004	

== Transactions ==
The Red Wings were involved in the following transactions from June 10, 2003, the day after the deciding game of the 2003 Stanley Cup Finals, through June 7, 2004, the day of the deciding game of the 2004 Stanley Cup Finals.

=== Trades ===
Date	Details		Ref
February 27, 2004	To Detroit Red Wings: Robert Lang	To Washington Capitals: Tomas Fleischmann; 1st-round pick in 2004; 4th-round pick in 2006	

=== Players acquired ===
Date	Player	Former team	Term	Via	Ref
July 3, 2003	Derian Hatcher	Dallas Stars	5-year	Free agency	
July 29, 2003	Jamie Rivers	Florida Panthers	1-year	Free agency	
July 29, 2003	Ray Whitney	Columbus Blue Jackets	3-year (Note: Club option for a fourth year.)	Free agency	
August 27, 2003	Kevin Miller	HC Davos (NLA)	1-year	Free agency	
September 1, 2003	Anders Myrvold	Adler Mannheim (DEL)		Free agency	
November 5, 2003	Steve Thomas	Anaheim Mighty Ducks	1-year	Free agency	
December 1, 2003	Blake Sloan	Grand Rapids Griffins (AHL)	1-year	Free agency	

=== Players lost ===
Date	Player	New team	Via (Note: In parentheses is the player's free agency group on July 1 if applicable.)	Ref
June 18, 2003	Dmitri Bykov	Ak Bars Kazan (RSL)	Free agency (II) (Note: Detroit retained Bykov’s NHL rights through the 2005–06 season.)	
July 19, 2003	Sergei Fedorov	Anaheim Mighty Ducks	Free agency (III)	
July 24, 2003	Luc Robitaille	Los Angeles Kings	Free agency (III)	
July 31, 2003	Ed Campbell	Boston Bruins	Free agency (VI)	
July 31, 2003	Jesse Wallin	Calgary Flames	Free agency (VI)	
August 8, 2003	Bryan Adams	Iserlohn Roosters (DEL)	Free agency (VI)	
August 28, 2003	Patrick Boileau	Pittsburgh Penguins	Free agency (VI)	
September 10, 2003	Igor Larionov	New Jersey Devils	Free agency (III)	
N/A	Tim Verbeek	Utah Grizzlies (AHL)	Free agency (UFA)	
December 3, 2003	Blake Sloan	Dallas Stars	Waivers	

=== Signings ===
Date	Player	Term	Contract type	Ref
June 26, 2003	Pavel Datsyuk	1-year (Note: Club option for a second year.)	Re-signing	
June 30, 2003	Dominik Hasek (Note: Hasek announced he was coming out of retirement on July 8.)	1-year	Option exercised	
June 30, 2003	Darren McCarty	4-year	Re-signing	
June 30, 2003	Jason Woolley	2-year	Re-signing	
July 1, 2003	Marc Lamothe	1-year	Re-signing	
July 7, 2003	Jiri Hudler	3-year	Entry-level	
July 15, 2003	Mathieu Dandenault	1-year	Re-signing	
July 15, 2003	Niklas Kronwall	2-year	Entry-level	
July 16, 2003	Mark Mowers	1-year	Re-signing	
August 20, 2003	Ryan Barnes	1-year	Re-signing	
August 25, 2003	Steve Yzerman	1-year	Re-signing	
September 15, 2003	Jason Williams	1-year	Re-signing	
April 2, 2004	Tomas Holmstrom	3-year	Extension	
April 3, 2004	Nicklas Lidstrom	2-year	Extension	
June 2, 2004	Todd Jackson	2-year	Entry-level	
June 2, 2004	Logan Koopmans	3-year	Entry-level	
June 2, 2004	Derek Meech	3-year	Entry-level	

== Draft picks ==
Detroit's draft picks at the 2003 NHL entry draft held at the Gaylord Entertainment Center in Nashville, Tennessee. The Red Wings were slated to pick 27th overall but traded their first pick to the Los Angeles Kings at the 2003 trade deadline.

Round	#	Player	Nationality	College/Junior/Club team (League)
2	64	Jimmy Howard (G)	United States	University of Maine (Hockey East)
4	132	Kyle Quincey (D)	Canada	London Knights (OHL)
5	164	Ryan Oulahen (C)	Canada	Brampton Battalion (OHL)
6	170	Andreas Sundin (LW)	Sweden	Linkopings HC (SWE)
6	194	Stefan Blom (D)	Sweden	Hammarby IF (SWE)
7	226	Tomas Kollar	Sweden	Hammarby IF (SWE)
8	258	Vladimir Kutny	Slovakia	Quebec Remparts (QMJHL)
9	289	Mikael Johansson (C)	Sweden	Arvika (SWE)

== Farm teams ==
=== Grand Rapids Griffins ===
The Griffins were Detroit's top affiliate in the American Hockey League in 2003–04.

=== Toledo Storm ===
The Storm were the Red Wings' ECHL affiliate for the 2003–04 season.

== See also ==
- 2003–04 NHL season
