= 2003–04 Minnesota Wild season =

National Hockey League team season

2003–04 Minnesota Wild
- Division: 4th Northwest
- Conference: 10th Western
- 2003–04 record: 30–29–20–3
- Home record: 19–13–7–2
- Road record: 11–16–13–1
- Goals for: 188
- Goals against: 183

Team information
- General manager: Doug Risebrough
- Coach: Jacques Lemaire
- Captain: Rotating; Brad Brown (Oct.); Andrew Brunette (Nov.); Richard Park (Dec.); Brad Bombardir (Jan.); Jim Dowd (Feb.); Andrew Brunette (Mar.–Apr.)
- Alternate captains: Andrew Brunette (Oct., Dec.–Feb.); Jim Dowd (Oct.–Jan., Mar.); Alex Henry; Richard Park (Oct.–Nov., Jan.-Apr.)
- Arena: Xcel Energy Center
- Average attendance: 18,530
- Minor league affiliates: Houston Aeros; Louisiana IceGators

Team leaders
- Goals: Alexandre Daigle (20)
- Assists: Andrew Brunette (34)
- Points: Alexandre Daigle (51)
- Penalty minutes: Matt Johnson (177)
- Plus/minus: Nick Schultz (+12); Willie Mitchell (+12)
- Wins: Dwayne Roloson (19)
- Goals against average: Dwayne Roloson (1.88)

The 2003–04 Minnesota Wild season was the team's fourth season in the National Hockey League (NHL). Despite an incredible playoff run the previous year in 2002–03, the Wild failed to qualify for the 2004 Stanley Cup playoffs.

== Regular season ==
=== All-Star Game ===
The 2004 NHL All-Star Game was held on February 8, 2004, at the Xcel Energy Center in St. Paul, Minnesota, home the Wild. The Eastern Conference defeated the Western Conference 6–4.

=== Final standings ===
Northwest Division
No.	CR		GP	W	L	T	OTL	GF	GA	PTS
1	3	**Vancouver Canucks**	82	43	24	10	5	235	194	101
2	4	**Colorado Avalanche**	82	40	22	13	7	235	198	100
3	6	**Calgary Flames**	82	42	30	7	3	200	176	94
4	9	Edmonton Oilers	82	36	29	12	5	221	208	89
5	10	Minnesota Wild	82	30	29	20	3	188	183	83

Note: CR = Conference rank; GP = Games played; W = Wins; L = Losses; T = Ties; OTL = Overtime loss; GF = Goals for; GA = Goals against; Pts = Points
Bolded teams qualified for the playoffs.

Western Conference
R		Div	GP	W	L	T	OTL	GF	GA	Pts
**1**	**P-** Detroit Red Wings	**CE**	**82**	**48**	**21**	**11**	**2**	**255**	**189**	109
**2**	**Y-** San Jose Sharks	**PA**	**82**	**43**	**21**	**12**	**6**	**255**	**183**	104
**3**	**Y-** Vancouver Canucks	**NW**	**82**	**43**	**24**	**10**	**5**	**235**	**194**	101
**4**	**X-** Colorado Avalanche	**NW**	**82**	**40**	**22**	**13**	**7**	**236**	**198**	100
**5**	**X-** Dallas Stars	**PA**	**82**	**41**	**26**	**13**	**2**	**194**	**175**	97
**6**	**X-** Calgary Flames	**NW**	**82**	**42**	**30**	**7**	**3**	**200**	**176**	94
**7**	**X-** St. Louis Blues	**CE**	**82**	**39**	**30**	**11**	**2**	**191**	**198**	91
**8**	**X-** Nashville Predators	**CE**	**82**	**38**	**29**	**11**	**4**	**216**	**217**	91
8.5
9	Edmonton Oilers	NW	82	36	29	12	5	221	208	89
10	Minnesota Wild	NW	82	30	29	20	3	188	183	83
11	Los Angeles Kings	PA	82	28	29	16	9	205	217	81
12	Mighty Ducks of Anaheim	PA	82	29	35	10	8	184	213	76
13	Phoenix Coyotes	PA	82	22	36	18	6	188	245	68
14	Columbus Blue Jackets	CE	82	25	45	8	4	177	238	62
15	Chicago Blackhawks	CE	82	20	43	11	8	188	259	59

Divisions: CE – Central, PA – Pacific, NW – Northwest

P – Clinched Presidents Trophy; Y – Clinched division; X – Clinched playoff spot

== Schedule and results ==
2003–04 regular season
October: 4–6–1–0 (home: 2–3–1–0; road: 2–3–0–0)

Game	Date	Score	Opponent	Record	Recap
1	October 8, 2003	0–1	@ Chicago Blackhawks (2003–04)	0–1–0–0	L
2	October 10, 2003	5–3	New York Rangers (2003–04)	1–1–0–0	W
3	October 12, 2003	2–3	San Jose Sharks (2003–04)	1–2–0–0	L
4	October 16, 2003	2–5	Colorado Avalanche (2003–04)	1–3–0–0	L
5	October 18, 2003	2–2 OT	Vancouver Canucks (2003–04)	1–3–1–0	T
6	October 19, 2003	1–3	@ Dallas Stars (2003–04)	1–4–1–0	L
7	October 21, 2003	2–3	Calgary Flames (2003–04)	1–5–1–0	L
8	October 24, 2003	4–3	@ Florida Panthers (2003–04)	2–5–1–0	W
9	October 25, 2003	2–3	@ Tampa Bay Lightning (2003–04)	2–6–1–0	L
10	October 28, 2003	3–1	@ Buffalo Sabres (2003–04)	3–6–1–0	W
11	October 30, 2003	3–2	Atlanta Thrashers (2003–04)	4–6–1–0	W

November: 4–6–3–0 (home: 2–4–2–0; road: 2–2–1–0)

Game	Date	Score	Opponent	Record	Recap
12	November 1, 2003	2–1	Washington Capitals (2003–04)	5–6–1–0	W
13	November 4, 2003	4–4 OT	@ Colorado Avalanche (2003–04)	5–6–2–0	T
14	November 7, 2003	3–0	@ Calgary Flames (2003–04)	6–6–2–0	W
15	November 8, 2003	3–4	@ Vancouver Canucks (2003–04)	6–7–2–0	L
16	November 11, 2003	1–0	Vancouver Canucks (2003–04)	7–7–2–0	W
17	November 13, 2003	0–2	Edmonton Oilers (2003–04)	7–8–2–0	L
18	November 15, 2003	1–1 OT	Detroit Red Wings (2003–04)	7–8–3–0	T
19	November 19, 2003	6–2	@ Pittsburgh Penguins (2003–04)	8–8–3–0	W
20	November 20, 2003	1–3	@ Philadelphia Flyers (2003–04)	8–9–3–0	L
21	November 22, 2003	2–5	Detroit Red Wings (2003–04)	8–10–3–0	L
22	November 26, 2003	1–3	Dallas Stars (2003–04)	8–11–3–0	L
23	November 28, 2003	1–2	San Jose Sharks (2003–04)	8–12–3–0	L
24	November 30, 2003	1–1 OT	Mighty Ducks of Anaheim (2003–04)	8–12–4–0	T

December: 6–2–6–0 (home: 3–1–1–0; road: 3–1–5–0)

Game	Date	Score	Opponent	Record	Recap
25	December 3, 2003	1–0	@ Edmonton Oilers (2003–04)	9–12–4–0	W
26	December 5, 2003	1–2	@ Calgary Flames (2003–04)	9–13–4–0	L
27	December 6, 2003	1–1 OT	@ Vancouver Canucks (2003–04)	9–13–5–0	T
28	December 9, 2003	2–1	Calgary Flames (2003–04)	10–13–5–0	W
29	December 11, 2003	0–1	Toronto Maple Leafs (2003–04)	10–14–5–0	L
30	December 13, 2003	3–2	Buffalo Sabres (2003–04)	11–14–5–0	W
31	December 15, 2003	5–2	@ Phoenix Coyotes (2003–04)	12–14–5–0	W
32	December 17, 2003	3–2	@ Colorado Avalanche (2003–04)	13–14–5–0	W
33	December 18, 2003	1–1 OT	@ Edmonton Oilers (2003–04)	13–14–6–0	T
34	December 20, 2003	5–2	Columbus Blue Jackets (2003–04)	14–14–6–0	W
35	December 23, 2003	3–3 OT	Nashville Predators (2003–04)	14–14–7–0	T
36	December 26, 2003	2–2 OT	@ Detroit Red Wings (2003–04)	14–14–8–0	T
37	December 29, 2003	2–2 OT	@ Calgary Flames (2003–04)	14–14–9–0	T
38	December 30, 2003	2–2 OT	@ Edmonton Oilers (2003–04)	14–14–10–0	T

January: 3–6–5–2 (home: 3–2–2–1; road: 0–4–3–1)

Game	Date	Score	Opponent	Record	Recap
39	January 2, 2004	1–2	Edmonton Oilers (2003–04)	14–15–10–0	L
40	January 4, 2004	1–3	@ Colorado Avalanche (2003–04)	14–16–10–0	L
41	January 5, 2004	1–1 OT	@ St. Louis Blues (2003–04)	14–16–11–0	T
42	January 7, 2004	7–4	Chicago Blackhawks (2003–04)	15–16–11–0	W
43	January 9, 2004	0–2	Phoenix Coyotes (2003–04)	15–17–11–0	L
44	January 12, 2004	3–3 OT	Nashville Predators (2003–04)	15–17–12–0	T
45	January 14, 2004	2–2 OT	Los Angeles Kings (2003–04)	15–17–13–0	T
46	January 16, 2004	4–2	Pittsburgh Penguins (2003–04)	16–17–13–0	W
47	January 17, 2004	2–2 OT	@ St. Louis Blues (2003–04)	16–17–14–0	T
48	January 19, 2004	0–2	@ Nashville Predators (2003–04)	16–18–14–0	L
49	January 21, 2004	4–2	Chicago Blackhawks (2003–04)	17–18–14–0	W
50	January 23, 2004	2–6	@ Mighty Ducks of Anaheim (2003–04)	17–19–14–0	L
51	January 24, 2004	0–4	@ San Jose Sharks (2003–04)	17–20–14–0	L
52	January 26, 2004	2–2 OT	@ Los Angeles Kings (2003–04)	17–20–15–0	T
53	January 29, 2004	2–3 OT	Montreal Canadiens (2003–04)	17–20–15–1	OTL
54	January 31, 2004	1–2 OT	@ Columbus Blue Jackets (2003–04)	17–20–15–2	OTL

February: 4–5–2–0 (home: 3–3–1–0; road: 1–2–1–0)

Game	Date	Score	Opponent	Record	Recap
55	February 2, 2004	4–0	St. Louis Blues (2003–04)	18–20–15–2	W
56	February 4, 2004	4–3	@ New York Rangers (2003–04)	19–20–15–2	W
57	February 10, 2004	1–3	Los Angeles Kings (2003–04)	19–21–15–2	L
58	February 13, 2004	3–0	Edmonton Oilers (2003–04)	20–21–15–2	W
59	February 15, 2004	1–2	Calgary Flames (2003–04)	20–22–15–2	L
60	February 17, 2004	4–4 OT	@ New Jersey Devils (2003–04)	20–22–16–2	T
61	February 19, 2004	6–2	Vancouver Canucks (2003–04)	21–22–16–2	W
62	February 22, 2004	1–3	Colorado Avalanche (2003–04)	21–23–16–2	L
63	February 26, 2004	0–4	@ Nashville Predators (2003–04)	21–24–16–2	L
64	February 27, 2004	1–3	@ Dallas Stars (2003–04)	21–25–16–2	L
65	February 29, 2004	3–3 OT	Carolina Hurricanes (2003–04)	21–25–17–2	T

March: 7–4–3–1 (home: 4–0–0–1; road: 3–4–3–0)

Game	Date	Score	Opponent	Record	Recap
66	March 3, 2004	0–2	@ Mighty Ducks of Anaheim (2003–04)	21–26–17–2	L
67	March 4, 2004	1–1 OT	@ Los Angeles Kings (2003–04)	21–26–18–2	T
68	March 7, 2004	1–1 OT	@ Phoenix Coyotes (2003–04)	21–26–19–2	T
69	March 9, 2004	4–3	@ San Jose Sharks (2003–04)	22–26–19–2	W
70	March 10, 2004	1–1 OT	@ Vancouver Canucks (2003–04)	22–26–20–2	T
71	March 14, 2004	3–2	Columbus Blue Jackets (2003–04)	23–26–20–2	W
72	March 16, 2004	5–2	Ottawa Senators (2003–04)	24–26–20–2	W
73	March 18, 2004	2–0	@ Boston Bruins (2003–04)	25–26–20–2	W
74	March 19, 2004	1–3	@ New York Islanders (2003–04)	25–27–20–2	L
75	March 22, 2004	2–3 OT	Phoenix Coyotes (2003–04)	25–27–20–3	OTL
76	March 24, 2004	0–2	@ Columbus Blue Jackets (2003–04)	25–28–20–3	L
77	March 25, 2004	8–2	@ Chicago Blackhawks (2003–04)	26–28–20–3	W
78	March 28, 2004	2–1	Mighty Ducks of Anaheim (2003–04)	27–28–20–3	W
79	March 29, 2004	3–5	@ Detroit Red Wings (2003–04)	27–29–20–3	L
80	March 31, 2004	5–4 OT	Colorado Avalanche (2003–04)	28–29–20–3	W

April: 2–0–0–0 (home: 2–0–0–0; road: 0–0–0–0)

Game	Date	Score	Opponent	Record	Recap
81	April 2, 2004	4–2	Dallas Stars (2003–04)	29–29–20–3	W
82	April 4, 2004	3–0	St. Louis Blues (2003–04)	30–29–20–3	W

Legend: W Win (2 points) L Loss (0 points) T Tie (1 point) OTL Overtime loss (1 point)

== Player statistics ==
=== Scoring ===
- Position abbreviations: C = Center; D = Defense; G = Goaltender; LW = Left wing; RW = Right wing
- † = Joined team via a transaction (e.g., trade, waivers, signing) during the season. Stats reflect time with the Wild only.
- ‡ = Left team via a transaction (e.g., trade, waivers, release) during the season. Stats reflect time with the Wild only.

No.	Player	Pos	Regular season					
No.	Player	Pos	GP	G	A	Pts	+/-	PIM
9	Alexandre Daigle	LW	78	20	31	51	−4	14
15	Andrew Brunette	RW	82	15	34	49	3	12
10	Marian Gaborik	RW	65	18	22	40	10	20
33	Sergei Zholtok‡	C	59	13	16	29	4	19
24	Antti Laaksonen	LW	77	12	14	26	0	20
11	Pascal Dupuis	LW	59	11	15	26	5	20
18	Richard Park	RW	73	13	12	25	0	28
37	Wes Walz	C	57	12	13	25	5	32
17	Filip Kuba	D	77	5	19	24	−7	28
34	Jim Dowd‡	C	55	4	20	24	6	38
96	Pierre-Marc Bouchard	LW	61	4	18	22	−7	22
32	Marc Chouinard	C	45	11	10	21	4	17
20	Andrei Zyuzin	D	65	8	13	21	4	48
28	Jason Wiemer†	C	62	7	11	18	−6	106
55	Nick Schultz	D	79	6	10	16	12	16
2	Willie Mitchell	D	70	1	13	14	12	83
19	Stephane Veilleux	LW	19	2	8	10	0	20
25	Rickard Wallin	C	15	5	4	9	1	14
26	Christoph Brandner	RW	35	4	5	9	−2	8
12	Matt Johnson	LW	57	7	1	8	4	177
21	Eric Chouinard†	RW	31	3	4	7	−7	6
36	Alex Henry†	LW	71	2	4	6	4	106
8	Brent Burns	RW	36	1	5	6	−10	12
23	Jason Marshall‡	D	12	1	4	5	−1	18
5	Brad Bombardir‡	D	56	1	2	3	−10	21
6	Zbynek Michalek	D	22	1	1	2	−7	4
14	Darby Hendrickson‡	C	14	1	0	1	−7	6
4	Brad Brown‡	D	30	0	1	1	−1	54
71 (Note: Roche wore number 39 in the season opener.)	Travis Roche	D	5	0	1	1	−3	0
30	Dwayne Roloson	G	48	0	1	1		8
27	Kyle Wanvig	RW	6	0	1	1	−2	10
35	Manny Fernandez	G	37	0	0	0		2
28	Jeremy Stevenson‡	RW	3	0	0	0	−1	2

=== Goaltending ===
No.	Player	Regular season									
No.	Player	GP	W	L	T	SA	GA	GAA	SV%	SO	TOI
30	Dwayne Roloson	48	19	18	11	1323	89	1.88	.933	5	2847
35	Manny Fernandez	37	11	14	9	1056	90	2.49	.915	2	2166

== Awards and records ==
=== Awards ===
Type	Award/honor	Recipient	Ref
League (annual)	Roger Crozier Saving Grace Award	Dwayne Roloson	
League (in-season)	NHL All-Star Game selection	Filip Kuba	
League (in-season)	NHL All-Star Game selection	Dwayne Roloson	
League (in-season)	NHL Defensive Player of the Week	Dwayne Roloson (December 22)	
League (in-season)	NHL YoungStars Game selection	Pierre-Marc Bouchard	
Team	Three Star Award	Dwayne Roloson	

=== Milestones ===
Milestone	Player	Date	Ref
First game	Christoph Brandner	October 8, 2003	
First game	Brent Burns	October 8, 2003	
First game	Zbynek Michalek	January 16, 2004	
750th game coached	Jacques Lemaire	December 11, 2003	

== Transactions ==
The Wild were involved in the following transactions from June 10, 2003, the day after the deciding game of the 2003 Stanley Cup Finals, through June 7, 2004, the day of the deciding game of the 2004 Stanley Cup Finals.

=== Trades ===
Date	Details		Ref
June 21, 2003	To Toronto Maple Leafs: 3rd-round pick in 2003; 4th-round pick in 2003	To Minnesota Wild: 3rd-round pick in 2003	
June 26, 2003	To Nashville Predators: Curtis Murphy	To Minnesota Wild: Peter Smrek	
June 26, 2003	To Ottawa Senators: Peter Smrek	To Minnesota Wild: Chris Bala	
December 9, 2003	To Phoenix Coyotes: Chris Dyment	To Minnesota Wild: Michael Schutte	
December 17, 2003	To Philadelphia Flyers: 5th-round pick in 2004	To Minnesota Wild: Eric Chouinard	
February 25, 2004	To Colorado Avalanche: Darby Hendrickson; 8th-round pick in 2004	To Minnesota Wild: 4th-round pick in 2005	
March 3, 2004	To San Jose Sharks: Jason Marshall	To Minnesota Wild: 5th-round pick in 2004	
March 4, 2004	To Montreal Canadiens: Jim Dowd	To Minnesota Wild: 4th-round pick in 2004	
March 5, 2004	To Nashville Predators: Brad Bombardir; Sergei Zholtok	To Minnesota Wild: Buffalo’s 3rd-round pick in 2004; 4th-round pick in 2004	
March 8, 2004	To Buffalo Sabres: Brad Brown; 6th-round pick in 2005	To Minnesota Wild: 4th-round pick in 2005	
March 9, 2004	To Colorado Avalanche: Chris Bala	To Minnesota Wild: Jordan Krestanovich	

=== Players acquired ===
Date	Player	Former team	Term	Via	Ref
July 28, 2003	Marc Chouinard	Anaheim Mighty Ducks		Free agency	
August 6, 2003	Jason Beckett	Nashville Predators	1-year	Free agency	
September 11, 2003	Chris McAlpine	Los Angeles Kings	1-year	Free agency	
September 30, 2003	Alexandre Daigle	Pittsburgh Penguins	1-year	Free agency	
October 9, 2003	Alex Henry	Washington Capitals		Waivers	
November 13, 2003	Jason Wiemer	New York Islanders		Waivers	
May 25, 2004	Ryan Stokes	Mississauga IceDogs (OHL)		Free agency	
June 3, 2004	Mark Rooneem	Calgary Hitmen (WHL)		Free agency	

=== Players lost ===
Date	Player	New team	Via (Note: In parentheses is the player's free agency group on July 1 if applicable.)	Ref
July 15, 2003	David Cullen	Buffalo Sabres	Free agency (VI)	
July 23, 2003	Ladislav Benysek	HIFK (Liiga)	Free agency (UFA)	
August 7, 2003	Dieter Kochan	New York Islanders	Free agency (VI)	
September 3, 2003	Jay Henderson	Milwaukee Admirals (AHL)	Free agency (UFA)	
September 9, 2003	Greg Crozier	New Jersey Devils	Free agency	
September 16, 2003	Lubomir Sekeras	Lokomotiv Yaroslavl (RSL)	Free agency (UFA)	
September 23, 2003	Chris McAlpine		Retirement	
October 1, 2003	Derek Gustafson	Louisiana IceGators (ECHL)	Free agency (UFA)	
October 8, 2003	Tony Tuzzolino	Binghamton Senators (AHL)	Free agency	
October 16, 2003	Rastislav Pavlikovsky	Leksands IF (SHL)	Free agency (VI)	
October 22, 2003	Jeremy Stevenson	Nashville Predators	Waivers	
January 9, 2004	Cliff Ronning	New York Islanders	Free agency (III)	

=== Signings ===
Date	Player	Term	Contract type	Ref
July 2, 2003	Mika Hannula		Entry-level	
July 8, 2003	Johan Holmqvist	multi-year	Re-signing	
July 15, 2003	Christoph Brandner	multi-year	Entry-level	
July 17, 2003	Mikko Koivu	multi-year	Entry-level	
July 23, 2003	Antti Laaksonen	1-year	Re-signing	
July 30, 2003	Manny Fernandez	1-year	Re-signing	
July 31, 2003	Andrei Zyuzin	multi-year	Re-signing	
August 11, 2003	Willie Mitchell	1-year	Re-signing	
September 15, 2003	Matt Johnson	1-year	Re-signing	
September 19, 2003	Matt Foy	multi-year	Entry-level	
October 1, 2003	Brent Burns		Entry-level	
October 26, 2003	Pascal Dupuis	3-year	Re-signing	
October 31, 2003	Marian Gaborik	multi-year	Re-signing	
February 28, 2004	Wes Walz	multi-year	Extension	
March 1, 2004	Matt Johnson	multi-year	Extension	

== Draft picks ==
The 2003 NHL entry draft was held at the Gaylord Entertainment Center in Nashville, Tennessee. After finishing the 2002–03 season with a 42–29–10–1 record, the Wild were awarded the 20th pick in the draft. Despite figuring fourth in the NHL for the previous season with only 178 goals allowed, and scoring only 198 goals, general manager Doug Risebrough selected defenseman Brent Burns in the first round.

Rnd	Pick	Player	Nationality	Pos	Team (league)
1	20	Brent Burns	Canada	D	Brampton Battalion (OHL)
2	56	Patrick O'Sullivan	United States	C	Mississauga IceDogs (OHL)
3	78	Danny Irmen	United States	C	Lincoln Stars (USHL)
5	157	Marcin Kolusz	Poland	F	Podhale Nowy Targ (Poland)
6	187	Miroslav Kopriva	Czech Republic	G	Rabat Kladno (Czech Extraliga)
7	207	Georgi Misharin	Russia	D	Dinamo-Energija Yekaterinburg (Russia)
7	219	Adam Courchaine	Canada	C	Vancouver Giants (WHL)
8	251	Mathieu Melanson	Canada	C	Chicoutimi Saguenéens (QMJHL)
9	281	Jean-Michel Bolduc	United States	D	Quebec Remparts (QMJHL)
