= Steve Gainey =

Canadian ice hockey player (born 1979)

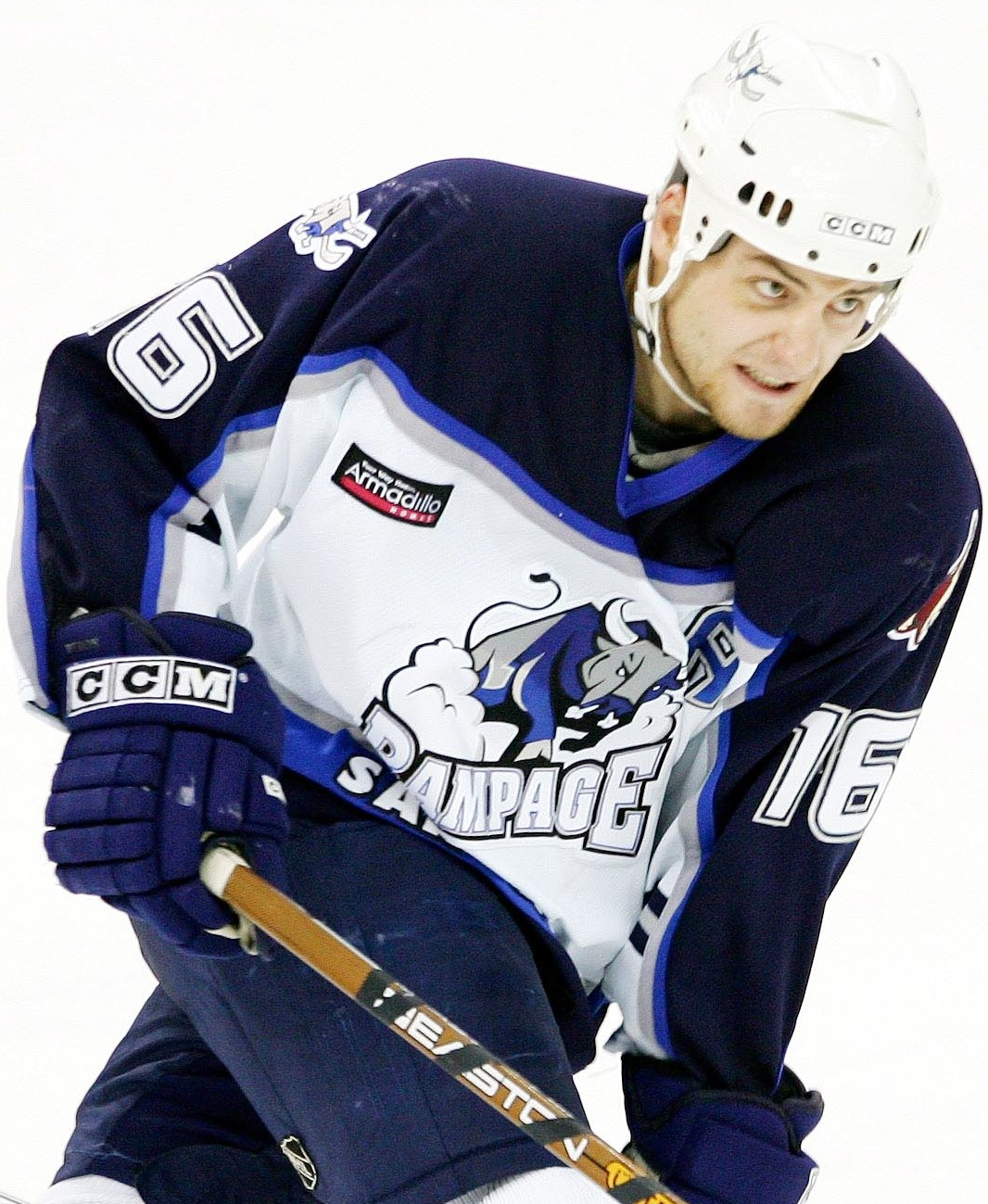
- Gainey with the San Antonio Rampage in 2005
- Born: January 26, 1979 (age 47) Montreal, Quebec, Canada
- Height: 6 ft 1 in (185 cm)
- Weight: 192 lb (87 kg; 13 st 10 lb)
- Position: Centre
- Shot: Left
- Played for: Dallas Stars; Phoenix Coyotes
- NHL draft: 77th overall, 1997; Dallas Stars
- Playing career: 1999–2006; 2008–2009

Steve Gainey (born January 26, 1979) is a Canadian former professional ice hockey forward who played in parts of four seasons in the National Hockey League (NHL) for the Dallas Stars and Phoenix Coyotes. He is the son of former NHL player and executive Bob Gainey.

== Playing career ==
Gainey was drafted in the third round, 77th overall, by the Dallas Stars in the 1997 NHL entry draft by his father, general manager Bob Gainey. Gainey attended St. Andrew's College for the 1994–95 academic year prior to playing for the WHL's Kamloops Blazers.

He made his NHL debut on February 1, 2001, against the San Jose Sharks.

On February 16, 2004, he was traded from the Stars, to the Philadelphia Flyers in exchange for Mike Siklenka. However, Gainey only spent time with their AHL affiliate the Philadelphia Phantoms. On November 4, 2005, he signed a one-year contract to play for the Phoenix Coyotes.

In September 2006, he was invited to the Vancouver Canucks training camp but was later cut from the camp. After two seasons in retirement, Gainey made a return to the professional ranks in signing a contract with the Idaho Steelheads of the ECHL on October 14, 2008. In the following 2008–09 season, Gainey was signed to a professional try-out contract with the Montreal Canadiens affiliate, the Hamilton Bulldogs, scoring 7 goals in 33 games before formally ending his professional career.

== Career statistics ==
=== Regular season and playoffs ===
			Regular season					Playoffs
Season	Team	League	GP	G	A	Pts	PIM	GP	G	A	Pts	PIM
1995–96	Kamloops Blazers	WHL	49	1	4	5	40	3	0	0	0	0
1996–97	Kamloops Blazers	WHL	60	9	18	27	60	2	0	0	0	9
1997–98	Kamloops Blazers	WHL	68	21	34	55	93	7	1	7	8	15
1998–99	Kamloops Blazers	WHL	68	30	34	64	155	15	5	4	9	38
1999–00	Fort Wayne Komets	UHL	1	0	0	0	0	—	—	—	—	—
1999–00	Michigan K-Wings	IHL	58	8	10	18	41	—	—	—	—	—
2000–01	Utah Grizzlies	IHL	61	7	7	14	167	—	—	—	—	—
2000–01	Dallas Stars	NHL	1	0	0	0	0	—	—	—	—	—
2001–02	Dallas Stars	NHL	5	0	1	1	7	—	—	—	—	—
2001–02	Utah Grizzlies	AHL	58	16	18	34	87	—	—	—	—	—
2002–03	Utah Grizzlies	AHL	68	9	17	26	106	2	0	0	0	11
2003–04	Utah Grizzlies	AHL	45	7	8	15	74	—	—	—	—	—
2003–04	Dallas Stars	NHL	7	0	0	0	7	—	—	—	—	—
2003–04	Philadelphia Phantoms	AHL	27	2	7	9	27	11	0	1	1	14
2004–05	Épinal Dauphins	FRA	26	9	10	19	91	4	1	3	4	6
2005–06	San Antonio Rampage	AHL	56	10	20	30	85	—	—	—	—	—
2005–06	Phoenix Coyotes	NHL	20	0	1	1	20	—	—	—	—	—
2008–09	Idaho Steelheads	ECHL	33	11	19	30	36	—	—	—	—	—
2008–09	Hamilton Bulldogs	AHL	33	7	3	10	32	—	—	—	—	—
NHL totals			33	0	2	2	34	—	—	—	—	—

== See also ==
- List of family relations in the NHL
