= Adam Munro =

Canadian ice hockey player (born 1982)

- Born: November 12, 1982 (age 43) St. George, Ontario, Canada
- Height: 6 ft 1.5 in (187 cm)
- Weight: 210 lb (95 kg; 15 st 0 lb)
- Position: Goaltender
- Caught: Left
- Played for: Chicago Blackhawks; HC Fribourg-Gottéron; HC Sibir Novosibirsk; Toronto Marlies; Syracuse Crunch; HC TWK Innsbruck; Norfolk Admirals (AHL); Erie Otters; Soo Greyhounds
- NHL draft: 29th overall, 2001; Chicago Blackhawks
- Playing career: 2003–2020

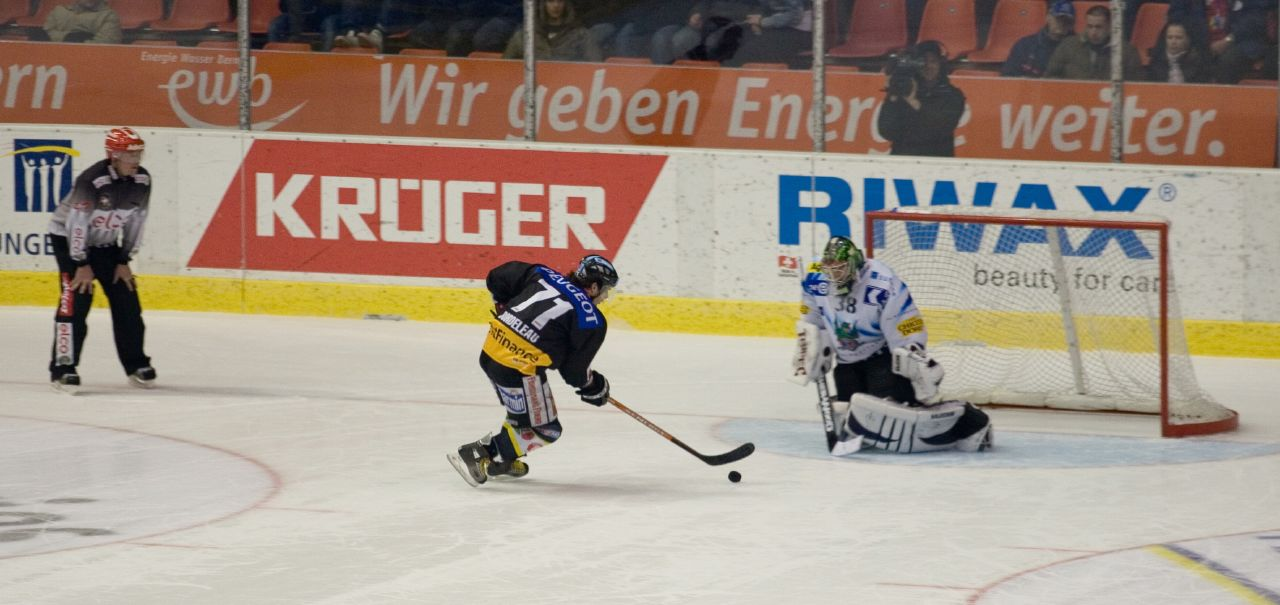
Munro goaltending for HC Fribourg-Gottéron

Adam Munro (born November 12, 1982) is a Canadian professional ice hockey goaltender. He played 17 games in the National Hockey League with the Chicago Blackhawks during the 2003–04 and 2005–06 seasons. The rest of his career, which lasted from 2003 to 2015, was spent in the minor leagues and then in Europe.

== Playing career ==
Munro was drafted in the 3rd round, 58th overall by the Erie Otters in the 1998 Ontario Hockey League Draft after winning the Championship in the Alliance Hockey league with Brantford.

During the 2000-01 OHL season, Munro went on a 22 game unbeaten streak (17-0-5) and finished with a 26-6-6 record and set 2 Erie Otters franchise records with a 2.31 GAA and .920 SV%. He participated in the CHL/NHL Top Prospects Game in Calgary, Alberta playing for Team Orr, beating Team Cherry.

Munro was drafted in the 1st round, 29th overall by the Chicago Blackhawks in the 2001 NHL entry draft. He split his time between Chicago and Norfolk Admirals (AHL) during the 03-04 and 05-06 season. He spent the majority of the 2004-05 NHL lockout in the AHL.

Munro signed as free agent with HC Fribourg-Gottéron on July 7, 2006.

He spent the 2007–08 season with the Columbus Blue Jackets' AHL affiliate, The Syracuse Crunch.

During the 2008–09 AHL season he played for the Toronto Marlies, the farm team for the Toronto Maple Leafs.

On October 15, 2009, Munro was re-signed by the Marlies under a professional try-out contract. He left the Marlies to sign a contract with HC Sibir Novosibirsk of the Kontinental Hockey League on January 15, 2010.

In the 2013–14 season, with HC TWK Innsbruck, Munro was credited with a goal December 30, 2013, against the EHC Black Wings Linz.

On April 26, 2017, Munro was listed as the #2 goalie in Erie Otters' History by The Hockey Writers.

On October 30, 2019, the Hamilton Steelhawks, of the Allan Cup Hockey league, announced that they had signed Munro for the 2019-2020 season.

== Career statistics ==
=== Regular season and playoffs ===
			Regular season										Playoffs
Season	Team	League	GP	W	L	T	OTL	MIN	GA	SO	GAA	SV%	GP	W	L	MIN	GA	SO	GAA	SV%
1997–98	Ohsweken Golden Eagles	MWJHL	15	13	2	0	—	660	20	4	1.36	—	—	—	—	—	—	—	—	—
1998–99	Brant County Golden Eagles	MWJHL	10	—	—	—	—	348	30	0	5.17	—	—	—	—	—	—	—	—	—
1998–99	Bowmanville Eagles	OPJHL	14	—	—	—	—	816	50	0	3.68	—	—	—	—	—	—	—	—	—
1998–99	Erie Otters	OHL	1	0	0	0	—	1	0	0	0.00	1.000	—	—	—	—	—	—	—	—
1999–00	Bowmanville Eaglers	OPJHL	2	2	0	0	—	125	5	0	2.40	—	—	—	—	—	—	—	—	—
1999–00	Erie Otters	OHL	22	8	7	1	—	948	48	1	3.04	.902	1	0	0	5	1	0	12.00	.857
2000–01	Erie Otters	OHL	41	26	6	6	—	2283	88	4	2.31	.926	10	6	2	509	27	1	3.18	.894
2001–02	Erie Otters	OHL	43	24	13	1	—	2277	128	3	3.37	.893	6	4	2	361	17	0	2.83	.918
2002–03	Erie Otters	OHL	8	2	6	0	—	426	24	1	3.38	.887	—	—	—	—	—	—	—	—
2002–03	Sault Ste. Marie Greyhounds	OHL	42	20	20	2	—	2494	160	1	3.85	.894	4	0	4	240	12	0	3.00	.929
2003–04	Chicago Blackhawks	NHL	7	1	5	1	—	426	26	0	3.66	.880	—	—	—	—	—	—	—	—
2003–04	Norfolk Admirals	AHL	12	5	4	1	—	695	26	0	2.24	.902	—	—	—	—	—	—	—	—
2003–04	Gwinnett Gladiators	ECHL	6	4	1	1	—	370	17	0	2.76	.894	1	0	1	60	2	0	2.01	.943
2004–05	Norfolk Admirals	AHL	30	14	10	2	—	1595	66	4	2.48	.905	—	—	—	—	—	—	—	—
2004–05	Atlantic City Boardwalk Bullies	ECHL	5	2	2	1	—	272	9	0	1.99	.937	—	—	—	—	—	—	—	—
2005–06	Chicago Blackhawks	NHL	10	3	5	—	2	501	25	1	3.00	.893	—	—	—	—	—	—	—	—
2005–06	Norfolk Admirals	AHL	28	17	8	—	1	1612	73	1	2.72	.909	4	0	4	239	15	0	3.77	.879
2006–07	HC Fribourg-Gottéron	NLA	41	12	28	—	0	2488	149	0	3.59	—	—	—	—	—	—	—	—	—
2007–08	Syracuse Crunch	AHL	25	13	9	—	1	1414	57	2	2.42	.913	1	0	0	20	4	0	12.04	.778
2008–09	Toronto Marlies	AHL	26	12	11	—	2	1511	61	2	2.42	.910	1	0	1	58	4	0	4.11	.879
2009–10	Toronto Marlies	AHL	14	3	8	—	1	727	38	0	3.14	.905	—	—	—	—	—	—	—	—
2009–10	Sibir Novosibirsk	KHL	4	0	1	—	1	120	7	0	3.50	.883	—	—	—	—	—	—	—	—
2010–11	SG Cortina	ITA	31	12	19	—	0	1830	101	0	3.31	.911	—	—	—	—	—	—	—	—
2011–12	Alba Volán Székesfehérvár	EBEL	38	22	15	—	0	2241	105	0	2.81	.919	6	2	4	—	—	0	2.83	.911
2012–13	Alba Volán Székesfehérvár	EBEL	37	15	21	—	0	—	—	1	2.95	.917	—	—	—	—	—	—	—	—
2013–14	HC TWK Innsbruck	EBEL	39	9	29	—	0	—	—	1	3.48	.910	—	—	—	—	—	—	—	—
2014–15	HC TWK Innsbruck	EBEL	48	17	30	—	0	—	—	3	2.91	.913	—	—	—	—	—	—	—	—
2019–20	Hamilton Steelers	ACH	14	12	1	—	0	—	—	1	2.62	.933	5	4	1	—	—	0	3.62	.910
NHL totals			17	4	10	1	2	927	51	1	3.30	.887	—	—	—	—	—	—	—	—

Awards and achievements
Preceded by Tuomo Ruutu	Chicago Blackhawks first-round draft pick 2001	Succeeded by Anton Babchuk
