= Nick Kuiper =

Canadian ice hockey player (born 1982)

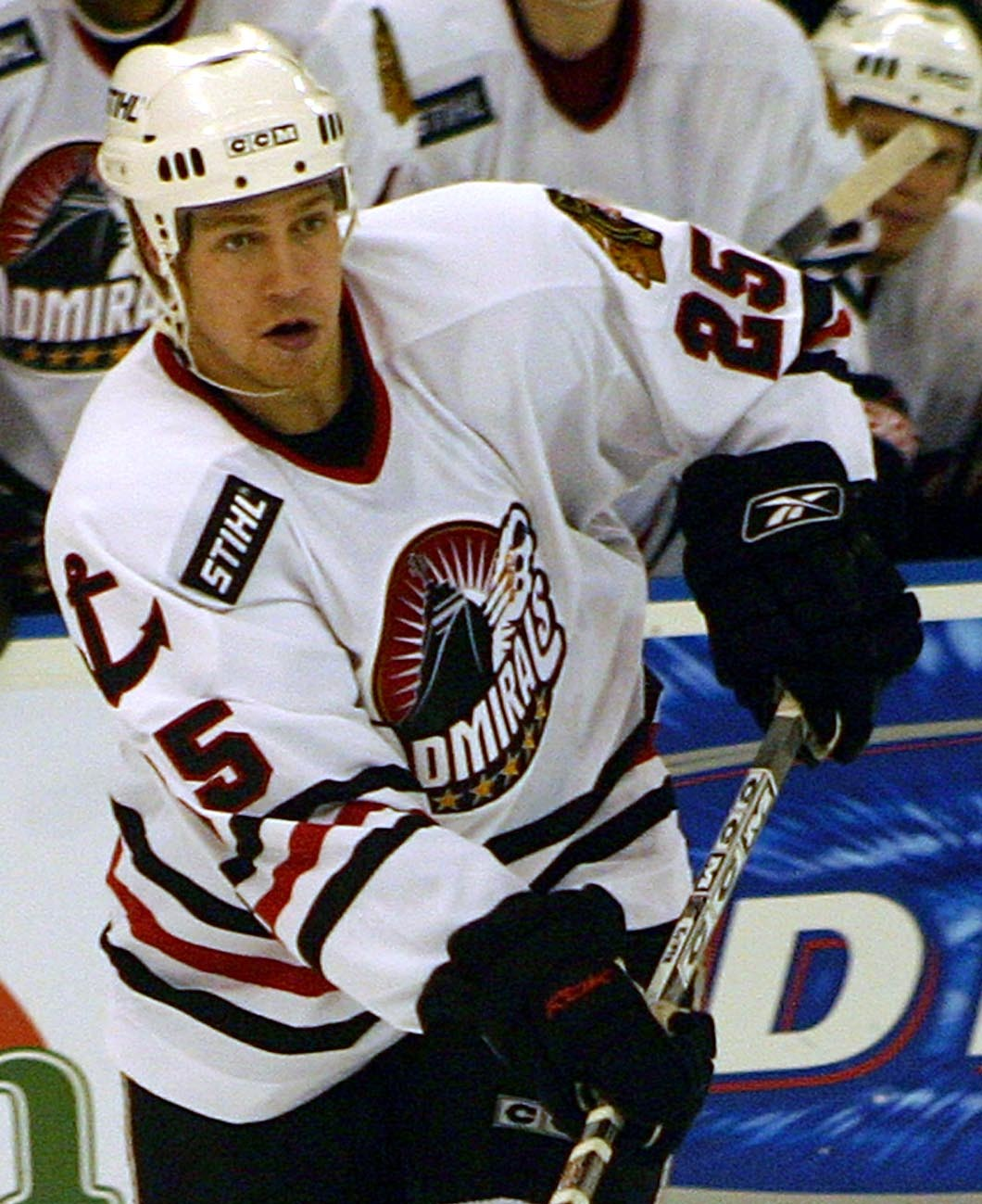
- Kuiper with the Norfolk Admirals in 2005
- Born: 12 February 1982 (age 44) Beaconsfield, Quebec, CAN
- Height: 6 ft 2 in (188 cm)
- Weight: 210 lb (95 kg; 15 st 0 lb)
- Position: Defence
- Shot: Right
- Played for: Ässät; Augusta Lynx; Belfast Giants; Friesland Flyers; Graz 99ers HC Alleghe; Johnstown ChiefsLuleå HF; Manitoba Moose; Norfolk Admirals; Portland Pirates; Springfield Falcons
- Playing career: 2004–2014

Nick Kuiper (born 12 February 1982) is a Canadian former professional ice hockey defenceman.

== Playing career ==
Kuiper began his professional career in 2004 after signing for the Chicago Blackhawks from the University of Massachusetts Amherst. Kuiper was assigned to the Blackhawks affiliate the Norfolk Admirals of the American Hockey League where he spent two seasons.

In 2006–07, Kuiper played for five different teams, beginning the season in the AHL for the Manitoba Moose and played just two games, after that he moved to the Portland Pirates in the same league and played just seven games. He then moved to the ECHL for the Augusta Lynx for 33 games, then moved back to the AHL with the Springfield Falcons for 18 games and then went back to the ECHL to play for the Johnstown Chiefs for their brief playoff run.

In 2007–08 Kuiper played for European teams, Ässät of the Finnish SM-liiga and Luleå HF of the Swedish SEL. In 2008–09 Kuiper signed with Austrian team Graz 99ers of the Austrian Hockey League. After scoring 6 goals in 53 games Kuiper signed a one-year contract extension on 15 July 2009.

Kuiper has signed for the Belfast Giants of the Elite Ice Hockey League in the United Kingdom for the 2011–12 season.

Kuiper signed a one-year contract with the Friesland Flyers of the Eredivisie on 29 July 2013.

== Awards ==
- 2001–02: HE All-Tournament Team
- 2011-12: EIHL Champion (Belfast Giants)

== Career statistics ==
			Regular season					Playoffs
Season	Team	League	GP	G	A	Pts	PIM	GP	G	A	Pts	PIM
2000–01	University of Massachusetts Amherst	HE	13	0	1	1	2	—	—	—	—	—
2001–02	U. of Mass-Amherst	HE	32	2	9	11	10	—	—	—	—	—
2002–03	U. of Mass-Amherst	HE	36	3	3	6	34	—	—	—	—	—
2003–04	U. of Mass-Amherst	HE	37	5	5	10	72	—	—	—	—	—
2004–05	Norfolk Admirals	AHL	73	3	5	8	109	5	0	0	0	2
2005–06	Norfolk Admirals	AHL	70	2	7	9	104	1	0	0	0	0
2006–07	Manitoba Moose	AHL	2	0	0	0	2	—	—	—	—	—
2006–07	Portland Pirates	AHL	7	0	0	0	6	—	—	—	—	—
2006–07	Augusta Lynx	ECHL	33	1	5	6	21	—	—	—	—	—
2006–07	Springfield Falcons	AHL	18	0	7	7	10	—	—	—	—	—
2006–07	Johnstown Chiefs	ECHL	—	—	—	—	—	2	0	0	0	0
2007–08	Ässät	SM-l	45	3	7	10	73	—	—	—	—	—
2007–08	Luleå HF	SEL	12	0	1	1	10	—	—	—	—	—
2008–09	Graz 99ers	EBEL	53	6	6	12	95	7	0	2	2	8
2009–10	Graz 99ers	EBEL	54	6	11	17	36	6	1	0	1	6
AHL totals			170	5	19	24	231	6	0	0	0	2
