= Michal Barinka =

Czech ice hockey player (born 1984)

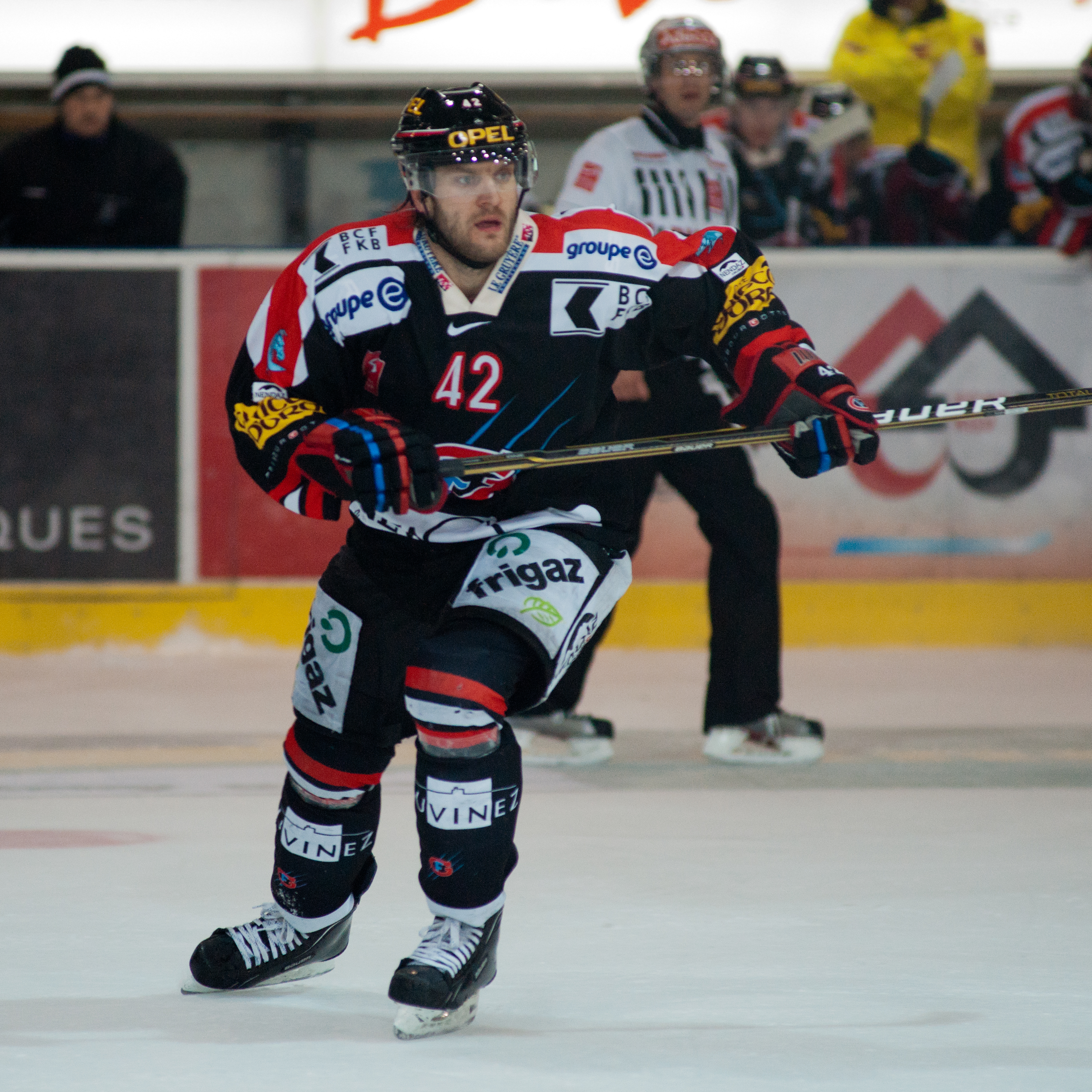
- Barinka with HC Fribourg-Gottéron in 2011
- Born: 12 June 1984 (age 42) Vyškov, Czechoslovakia
- Height: 6 ft 3 in (191 cm)
- Weight: 221 lb (100 kg; 15 st 11 lb)
- Position: Defence
- Shot: Left
- ELH team Former teams: HC Kometa Brno; Extraliga; HC České Budějovice; HC Vítkovice; HC Sparta Praha; NHL; Chicago Blackhawks; AHL; Norfolk Admirals; Binghamton Senators; KHL; Lokomotiv Yaroslavl; NLA; SC Bern; Fribourg-Gottéron
- National team: Czech Republic
- NHL draft: 59th overall, 2003; Chicago Blackhawks
- Playing career: 2003–2022

Michal Barinka (born 12 June 1984) is a Czech professional ice hockey defenceman who currently plays for HC Kometa Brno of the Czech Extraliga. He was drafted 59th overall in the second round of the 2003 NHL entry draft by the Chicago Blackhawks. He was traded to the Ottawa Senators in a three-way deal on 9 July 2006, that sent Martin Havlát to the Chicago Blackhawks, but did not play for Ottawa. After playing in the American Hockey League, he moved to Europe for the rest of his career.

== Career statistics ==
=== Regular season and playoffs ===
			Regular season					Playoffs
Season	Team	League	GP	G	A	Pts	PIM	GP	G	A	Pts	PIM
1999–2000	HC České Budějovice	CZE U18	48	1	12	13	26	6	0	2	2	4
2000–01	HC České Budějovice	CZE U18	7	0	1	1	6	—	—	—	—	—
2000–01	HC České Budějovice	CZE U20	26	1	8	9	14	3	0	0	0	0
2001–02	HC České Budějovice	CZE U20	31	3	13	16	60	7	3	4	7	35
2001–02	HC České Budějovice	ELH	3	0	0	0	0	—	—	—	—	—
2002–03	HC České Budějovice	CZE U20	14	1	5	6	34	—	—	—	—	—
2002–03	HC České Budějovice	ELH	31	0	1	1	14	4	0	0	0	2
2003–04	Norfolk Admirals	AHL	40	4	2	6	80	—	—	—	—	—
2003–04	Chicago Blackhawks	NHL	9	0	1	1	6	—	—	—	—	—
2004–05	Norfolk Admirals	AHL	59	1	10	11	77	—	—	—	—	—
2005–06	Norfolk Admirals	AHL	54	1	11	12	86	4	0	0	0	11
2005–06	Chicago Blackhawks	NHL	25	0	1	1	20	—	—	—	—	—
2006–07	Binghamton Senators	AHL	17	0	2	2	22	—	—	—	—	—
2006–07	HC Vítkovice Steel	ELH	15	3	3	6	18	—	—	—	—	—
2006–07	SC Bern	NLA	—	—	—	—	—	17	0	3	3	20
2007–08	HC Vítkovice Steel	ELH	19	0	0	0	24	—	—	—	—	—
2008–09	HC Vítkovice Steel	ELH	47	2	9	11	50	10	0	4	4	4
2009–10	HC Vítkovice Steel	ELH	15	0	2	2	12	16	3	8	11	28
2010–11	HC Vítkovice Steel	ELH	32	4	8	12	26	—	—	—	—	—
2010–11	Lokomotiv Yaroslavl	KHL	7	0	3	3	16	9	2	3	5	12
2011–12	HC Fribourg–Gottéron	NLA	39	1	6	7	30	9	0	0	0	8
2012–13	HC Vítkovice Steel	ELH	47	5	10	15	50	11	0	1	1	20
2013–14	HC Vítkovice Steel	ELH	44	4	11	15	36	8	0	2	2	8
2014–15	HC Sparta Praha	ELH	49	5	13	18	72	10	0	1	1	10
2015–16	HC Sparta Praha	ELH	19	2	3	5	22	14	4	0	4	14
2016–17	HC Sparta Praha	ELH	37	0	3	3	32	3	0	0	0	14
2017–18	HC Kometa Brno	ELH	40	1	3	4	32	11	0	0	0	10
2018–19	HC Kometa Brno	ELH	43	4	3	7	58	3	0	1	1	6
2019–20	Rytíři Kladno	ELH	49	1	4	5	26	—	—	—	—	—
2020–21	HC Vítkovice Ridera	ELH	3	0	0	0	0	—	—	—	—	—
2020–21	Rytíři Kladno	CZE.2	2	0	0	0	2	—	—	—	—	—
2020–21	HC Kometa Brno	ELH	12	0	0	0	20	3	0	0	0	34
2021–22	HC RT Torax Poruba	CZE.2	18	0	3	3	18	—	—	—	—	—
ELH totals			505	31	73	104	492	93	7	17	24	140
AHL totals			170	6	25	31	265	4	0	0	0	11
NHL totals			34	0	2	2	26	—	—	—	—	—

=== International ===
Year	Team	Event	GP	G	A	Pts	PIM
2002	Czech Republic	WJC18	8	4	2	6	6
2004	Czech Republic	WJC	5	1	1	2	6
2007	Czech Republic	WC	7	1	2	3	8
2009	Czech Republic	WC	5	0	0	0	2
2010	Czech Republic	WC	4	0	0	0	4
2014	Czech Republic	OG	3	0	0	0	2
Junior totals			13	5	3	8	12
Senior totals			19	1	2	3	16
