= Ľubomír Sekeráš =

Slovak ice hockey player (born 1968)

- Born: November 18, 1968 (age 57) Trenčín, Czechoslovakia
- Height: 6 ft 0 in (183 cm)
- Weight: 183 lb (83 kg; 13 st 1 lb)
- Position: Defense
- Shot: Left
- Played for: Minnesota Wild; Dallas Stars; HC Oceláři Třinec; HC Zlín; Lokomotiv Yaroslavl; Södertälje SK; Malmö Redhawks; Nürnberg Ice Tigers; HC Dukla Trenčín
- National team: Slovakia
- NHL draft: 232nd overall, 2000; Minnesota Wild
- Playing career: 1988–2011

Ľubomír Sekeráš (born November 18, 1968) is a Slovak former professional ice hockey player. Sekeráš last played with hometown team HC Dukla Trenčín of the Slovak Extraliga. Sekeráš has played in the National Hockey League (NHL) with the Minnesota Wild and Dallas Stars.

== Playing career ==
He started his career with the HC Dukla Trenčín of the then Czechoslovak Extraliga. After the Dissolution of Czechoslovakia in 1993, he continued to play for Dukla Trenčín, but in the Slovak Extraliga winning the Championship in its first season. He continued playing for Dukla Trenčín until 1995. At the start of the 1995-96 season, he began to play for HC Oceláři Třinec of the Czech Extraliga, which he would play for until the end of the 1999-00 season.

Sekeráš was drafted, at the age of 31, in the 8th round (232nd overall) by the Minnesota Wild of the 2000 NHL entry draft. He played immediately as part of the expansion team's inaugural 2000–01 season. He continued to play for the Wild through the 2003 playoffs scoring his first playoff goal, a game winner, in the turning point over the Vancouver Canucks in the Conference Semifinals. The Wild continued to make an unexpected run deep into the playoffs until they were eliminated by the Mighty Ducks of Anaheim in the Western Conference Finals.

A free agent in the 2003–04 season, Sekeráš signed with Lokomotiv Yaroslavl of the Russian Superleague. Lubomir left after 15 games to join Södertälje SK of the Swedish Elite League. Sekeráš whirlwind year continued when he was signed by the injury depleted Dallas Stars on March 9, 2004, to fill in for the remainder of the season. Sekeras played for the Nürnberg Ice Tigers of the German Hockey League in 2004–05, and returned to Sweden in 2006–07, when he played for Malmö Redhawks.

== Career statistics ==
=== Regular season and playoffs ===
			Regular season					Playoffs
Season	Team	League	GP	G	A	Pts	PIM	GP	G	A	Pts	PIM
1987–88	ASVŠ Dukla Trenčín	CSSR	9	0	0	0	—	—	—	—	—	—
1988–89	ASVŠ Dukla Trenčín	CSSR	16	2	5	7	22	11	0	4	4	0
1989–90	ASVŠ Dukla Trenčín	CSSR	44	6	8	14	—	9	0	2	2	—
1990–91	ASVŠ Dukla Trenčín	CSSR	52	6	16	22	26	6	0	1	1	0
1991–92	ASVŠ Dukla Trenčín	CSSR	32	2	6	8	32	13	1	1	2	0
1992–93	ASVŠ Dukla Trenčín	CSSR	40	5	19	24	48	11	4	9	13	0
1993–94	Dukla Trenčín	SVK	36	9	12	21	46	9	2	4	6	10
1994–95	Dukla Trenčín	SVK	36	11	11	22	24	9	2	7	9	8
1995–96	HC Železárny Třinec	ELH	40	11	13	24	44	3	0	0	0	0
1996–97	HC Železárny Třinec	ELH	51	14	20	34	54	4	1	0	1	2
1997–98	HC Železárny Třinec	ELH	44	9	30	39	34	13	2	10	12	4
1998–99	HC Železárny Třinec	ELH	50	8	15	23	38	10	2	6	8	6
1999–00	HC Oceláři Třinec	ELH	52	7	24	31	42	4	0	2	2	2
2000–01	Minnesota Wild	NHL	80	11	23	34	52	—	—	—	—	—
2001–02	Minnesota Wild	NHL	69	4	20	24	38	—	—	—	—	—
2002–03	Minnesota Wild	NHL	60	2	9	11	30	15	1	1	2	6
2003–04	Lokomotiv Yaroslavl	RSL	15	0	3	3	6	—	—	—	—	—
2003–04	Södertälje SK	SEL	33	4	13	17	30	—	—	—	—	—
2003–04	Dallas Stars	NHL	4	1	1	2	2	—	—	—	—	—
2004–05	Nürnberg Ice Tigers	DEL	52	4	27	31	48	6	0	1	1	4
2005–06	Dukla Trenčín	SVK	12	0	4	4	12	—	—	—	—	—
2005–06	Malmö Redhawks	Allsv	35	3	16	19	20	9	0	2	2	8
2006–07	HC Hamé Zlín	ELH	12	1	0	1	30	—	—	—	—	—
2006–07	Malmö Redhawks	SEL	23	3	10	13	28	—	—	—	—	—
2007–08	HC Oceláři Třinec	ELH	46	7	12	19	36	8	1	0	1	10
2008–09	HC Oceláři Třinec	ELH	48	6	10	16	22	5	1	0	1	4
2009–10	Dukla Trenčín	SVK	47	4	30	34	42	—	—	—	—	—
2010–11	Dukla Trenčín	SVK	40	1	3	4	28	11	2	4	6	8
2013–14	MHK Dubnica nad Váhom	SVK.3	4	0	0	0	0	—	—	—	—	—
CSSR totals			193	21	54	75	—	50	5	17	22	—
ELH totals			344	63	124	187	300	47	7	18	25	28
NHL totals			213	18	53	71	122	15	1	1	2	6

=== International ===
Ľubomír Sekeráš
Medal record

Representing Slovakia

Ice hockey

World Championships
Silver medal – second place	2000 Saint Petersburg	

Year	Team	Event	GP	G	A	Pts	PIM
1994	Slovakia	OLY	8	0	0	0	10
1994	Slovakia	WC C	6	0	3	3	4
1995	Slovakia	WC B	7	3	4	7	22
1996	Slovakia	WC	5	2	0	2	4
1996	Slovakia	WCH	1	0	0	0	2
1997	Slovakia	WC	8	0	3	3	8
1998	Slovakia	OLY	4	0	4	4	2
1998	Slovakia	WC	6	0	0	0	16
1999	Slovakia	WC	5	0	5	5	8
2000	Slovakia	WC	7	2	4	6	6
2001	Slovakia	WC	7	0	1	1	8
Senior totals			51	4	17	21	64
