= Blake Sloan =

American ice hockey player (born 1975)

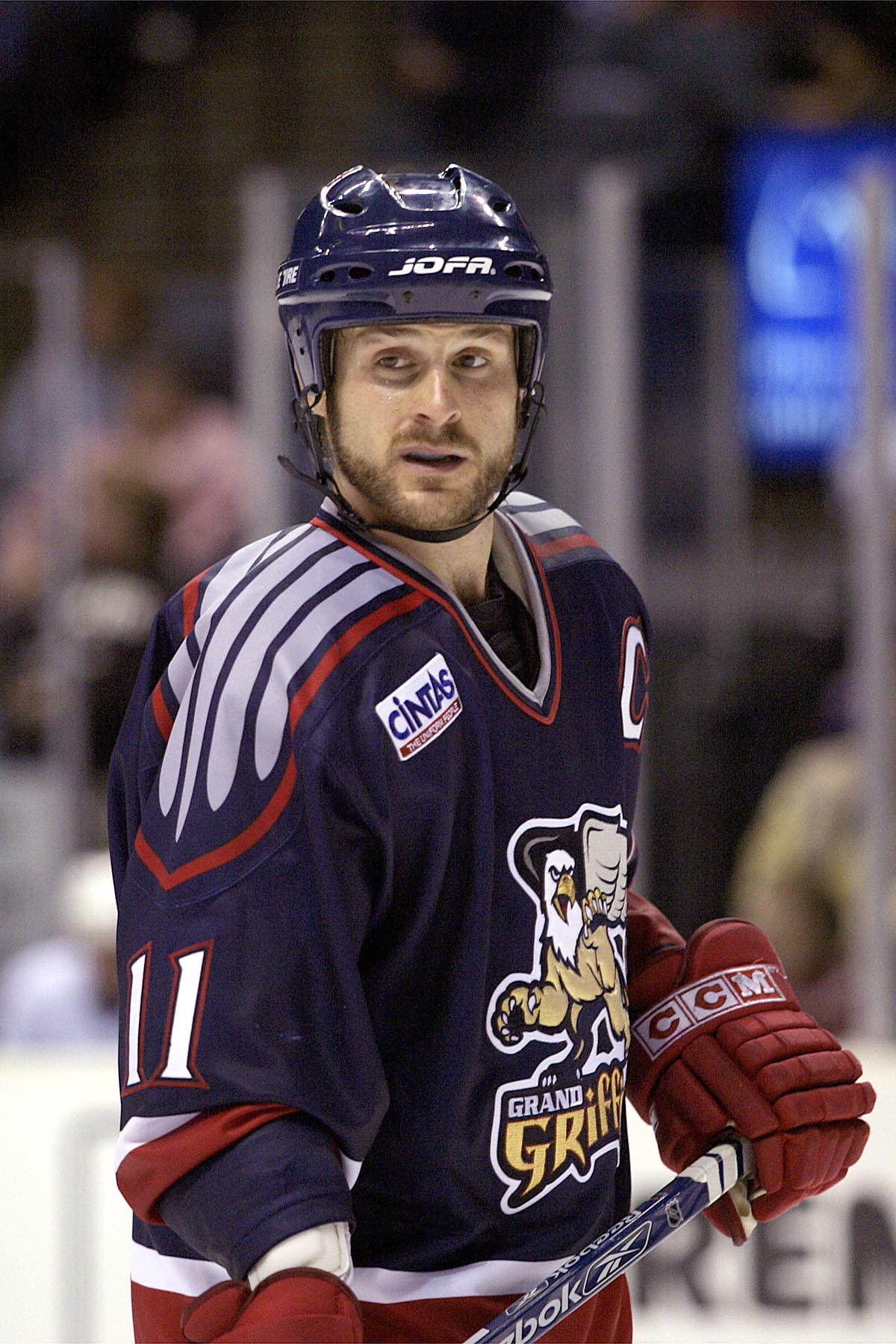
- Sloan with the Grand Rapids Griffins in 2004
- Born: July 27, 1975 (age 50) Park Ridge, Illinois, U.S.
- Height: 5 ft 10 in (178 cm)
- Weight: 196 lb (89 kg; 14 st 0 lb)
- Position: Defence/Right wing
- Shot: Right
- Played for: Dallas Stars; Columbus Blue Jackets; Calgary Flames; Timrå IK; Adler Mannheim; Grizzly Adams Wolfsburg; EHC München
- National team: United States
- NHL draft: Undrafted
- Playing career: 1997–2013

Blake Richard Sloan (born July 27, 1975) is an American former professional ice hockey player who played six seasons in the National Hockey League (NHL). He played right wing during the first half of his career and moved to defense when he started playing in the German Deutsche Eishockey Liga.

== Playing career ==
As a youth, Sloan played in the 1988 Quebec International Pee-Wee Hockey Tournament with the Chicago Young Americans minor ice hockey team.

Sloan played for the University of Michigan from 93–96 and won the NCAA championship in 1996. He also was awarded the Humanitarian Award in 1996–97, given annually to the player judged "college hockey's finest citizen."

Sloan started his NHL career with the Dallas Stars in 1999. He started the 1998–99 season in the minor leagues with the Houston Aeros. At a game where Dallas Stars scouts were their check on other players, Sloan caught the eye of the Stars and promptly acquired him. He won a Stanley Cup with Dallas in 1999. His determination and effort earned him the nickname "The Caffeinated Squirrel", by Dallas Stars broadcaster Daryl Reaugh.

He also played with the Calgary Flames and Columbus Blue Jackets. In 2005–06, he played in Sweden's Elitserien for Timrå IK.

For the 2006–07season, Sloan signed to play in Germany for Adler Mannheim in the Deutsche Eishockey Liga. Blake contributed to immediate success, winning the DEL championship that season.

After three seasons in Mannheim, on July 23, 2009, he signed a one-year deal to captain fellow DEL team, the Grizzly Adams Wolfsburg. In the ensuing 2009–10 season, Sloan recorded his best German season to score 26 points in 55 games. On April 20, 2010, Sloan agreed to a one-year extension to remain in Wolfsburg.

On July 6, 2012, as a free agent after his third season with the Grizzly Adams, Sloan signed a one-year contract with EHC München.

== Career statistics ==
=== Regular season and playoffs ===
			Regular season					Playoffs
Season	Team	League	GP	G	A	Pts	PIM	GP	G	A	Pts	PIM
1992–93	Tabor Academy	USHS	33	7	15	22	10	—	—	—	—	—
1992–93	Boston Jr. Bruins	MBAHL	20	10	31	41	14	—	—	—	—	—
1993–94	University of Michigan	CCHA	38	2	4	6	48	—	—	—	—	—
1994–95	University of Michigan	CCHA	39	2	15	17	60	—	—	—	—	—
1995–96	University of Michigan	CCHA	41	6	24	30	55	—	—	—	—	—
1996–97	University of Michigan	CCHA	41	2	15	17	52	—	—	—	—	—
1997–98	Houston Aeros	IHL	70	2	13	15	86	2	0	0	0	0
1998–99	Houston Aeros	IHL	62	8	10	18	76	—	—	—	—	—
1998–99	Dallas Stars	NHL	14	0	0	0	10	19	0	2	2	8
1999–00	Dallas Stars	NHL	67	4	13	17	50	16	0	0	0	12
2000–01	Houston Aeros	IHL	20	7	4	11	18	—	—	—	—	—
2000–01	Dallas Stars	NHL	33	2	2	4	4	—	—	—	—	—
2000–01	Columbus Blue Jackets	NHL	14	1	0	1	13	—	—	—	—	—
2001–02	Columbus Blue Jackets	NHL	60	2	7	9	46	—	—	—	—	—
2001–02	Calgary Flames	NHL	7	0	2	2	4	—	—	—	—	—
2002–03	Calgary Flames	NHL	67	2	8	10	28	—	—	—	—	—
2003–04	Grand Rapids Griffins	AHL	7	4	2	6	4	—	—	—	—	—
2003–04	Dallas Stars	NHL	28	0	0	0	7	—	—	—	—	—
2004–05	Grand Rapids Griffins	AHL	78	15	11	26	68	—	—	—	—	—
2005–06	Timrå IK	SEL	38	2	2	4	40	—	—	—	—	—
2006–07	Adler Mannheim	DEL	52	4	10	14	80	11	0	2	2	6
2007–08	Adler Mannheim	DEL	52	1	3	4	42	5	1	0	1	14
2008–09	Adler Mannheim	DEL	50	4	10	14	101	9	0	0	0	8
2009–10	Grizzly Adams Wolfsburg	DEL	55	3	23	26	56	7	0	0	0	10
2010–11	Grizzly Adams Wolfsburg	DEL	43	2	10	12	77	9	1	0	1	31
2011–12	Grizzly Adams Wolfsburg	DEL	24	1	2	3	24	4	0	0	0	6
2012–13	EHC München	DEL	51	3	9	12	54	—	—	—	—	—
NHL totals			290	11	32	43	162	35	0	2	2	20

Medal record

Representing United States

Ice hockey

World Championships
Bronze medal – third place	2004 Prague	

=== International ===
Year	Team	Event	GP	G	A	Pts	PIM
2004	United States	WC	9	2	0	2	4
Senior int'l totals			9	2	0	2	4

== Awards and honors ==
Award	Year
All-CCHA Rookie Team	1993-94
CCHA All-Tournament Team	1994
