= 2003–04 Philadelphia Flyers season =

NHL hockey team season

2003–04 Philadelphia Flyers
- Atlantic Division champions
- Division: 1st Atlantic
- Conference: 3rd Eastern
- 2003–04 record: 40–21–15–6
- Home record: 24–11–3–3
- Road record: 16–10–12–3
- Goals for: 229
- Goals against: 186

Team information
- General manager: Bob Clarke
- Coach: Ken Hitchcock
- Captain: Keith Primeau
- Alternate captains: John LeClair; Mark Recchi
- Arena: Wachovia Center
- Average attendance: 19,375
- Minor league affiliates: Philadelphia Phantoms; Trenton Titans

Team leaders
- Goals: Mark Recchi (26)
- Assists: Mark Recchi (49)
- Points: Mark Recchi (75)
- Penalty minutes: Donald Brashear (212)
- Plus/minus: John LeClair (+20)
- Wins: Robert Esche (21)
- Goals against average: Robert Esche (2.04)

The 2003–04 Philadelphia Flyers season was the franchise's 37th season in the National Hockey League (NHL). The Flyers reached the Eastern Conference finals but lost in seven games to the eventual champion Tampa Bay Lightning.

== Regular season ==
Free-agent goaltender Jeff Hackett was signed from the Boston Bruins to replace Roman Cechmanek and challenge backup Robert Esche for the number one spot in 2003–04, but Hackett was forced to retire in February due to vertigo. During the course of the season, serious injuries suffered by both Jeremy Roenick (broken jaw) and Keith Primeau (concussion) in February forced the Flyers to trade for the Chicago Blackhawks' Alexei Zhamnov, who filled in well and kept the Flyers afloat. Esche entrenched himself as starter and remained in that position even after the Flyers re-acquired Sean Burke from the Phoenix Coyotes, as the Flyers clinched the Atlantic Division title over the New Jersey Devils on the last day of the season.

=== Season standings ===
Atlantic Division
No.	CR		GP	W	L	T	OTL	GF	GA	PTS
1	3	**Philadelphia Flyers**	82	40	21	15	6	229	186	101
2	6	**New Jersey Devils**	82	43	25	12	2	213	164	100
3	8	**New York Islanders**	82	38	29	11	4	237	210	91
4	13	New York Rangers	82	27	40	7	8	206	250	69
5	15	Pittsburgh Penguins	82	23	47	8	4	190	303	58

Note: CR = Conference rank; GP = Games played; W = Wins; L = Losses; T = Ties; OTL = Overtime loss; GF = Goals for; GA = Goals against; Pts = Points
Bolded teams qualified for the playoffs.

Eastern Conference
R		Div	GP	W	L	T	OTL	GF	GA	Pts
**1**	**Z-** Tampa Bay Lightning	**SE**	**82**	**46**	**22**	**8**	**6**	**245**	**192**	106
**2**	**Y-** Boston Bruins	**NE**	**82**	**41**	**19**	**15**	**7**	**209**	**188**	104
**3**	**Y-** Philadelphia Flyers	**AT**	**82**	**40**	**21**	**15**	**6**	**209**	**188**	101
**4**	**X-** Toronto Maple Leafs	**NE**	**82**	**45**	**24**	**10**	**3**	**242**	**204**	103
**5**	**X-** Ottawa Senators	**NE**	**82**	**43**	**23**	**10**	**6**	**262**	**189**	102
**6**	**X-** New Jersey Devils	**AT**	**82**	**43**	**25**	**12**	**2**	**213**	**164**	100
**7**	**X-** Montreal Canadiens	**NE**	**82**	**41**	**30**	**7**	**4**	**208**	**192**	93
**8**	**X-** New York Islanders	**AT**	**82**	**38**	**29**	**11**	**4**	**237**	**210**	91
8.5
9	Buffalo Sabres	NE	82	37	34	7	4	220	221	85
10	Atlanta Thrashers	SE	82	33	37	8	4	214	243	78
11	Carolina Hurricanes	SE	82	28	34	14	6	172	209	76
12	Florida Panthers	SE	82	28	35	15	4	188	221	75
13	New York Rangers	AT	82	27	40	7	8	206	250	69
14	Washington Capitals	SE	82	23	46	10	3	186	253	59
15	Pittsburgh Penguins	AT	82	23	47	8	4	190	303	58

Divisions: AT – Atlantic, NE – Northeast, SE – Southeast

Z – Clinched conference; Y – Clinched division; X – Clinched playoff spot

== Playoffs ==
Though solid in net, Esche's performance was overshadowed by the play of captain Keith Primeau in the playoffs. Primeau led the Flyers past the defending Stanley Cup champion Devils in five, and the Toronto Maple Leafs in six on their way to the Eastern Conference finals and a match-up with the Tampa Bay Lightning. Despite winning Game 6 on the late-game heroics of Primeau and winger Simon Gagne, the Flyers would come up short once again losing Game 7 in Tampa, 2–1.

== Schedule and results ==
=== Preseason ===
2003 preseason
Preseason: 3–4–1 (home: 2–1–0; road: 1–3–1)

Game	Date	Score	Opponent	Record	Recap
1	September 19	6–1	New Jersey Devils	1–0–0	W
2	September 20	4–2	@ Washington Capitals	2–0–0	W
3^{[a]}	September 23	0–3	@ New Jersey Devils	2–1–0	L
4	September 26	5–4 OT	New Jersey Devils	3–1–0	W
5	September 27	2–4	@ New Jersey Devils	3–2–0	L
6	September 30	1–4	New York Islanders	3–3–0	L
7	October 1	4–4 OT	@ Washington Capitals	3–3–1	T
8^{[b]}	October 2	2–4	@ New York Islanders	3–4–1	L
Notes:^{a} Game played at Sovereign Bank Arena in Trenton, New Jersey.^{b} Game played at Giant Center in Hershey, Pennsylvania.

Legend: W Win (2 points) L Loss (0 points) T Tie (1 point) OTL Overtime loss (1 point)

=== Regular season ===
2003–04 regular season
October: 4–2–3–1, 12 points (home: 3–0–2–0; road: 1–2–1–1)

Game	Date	Score	Opponent	Decision	Record	Points	Recap
1	October 9	2–0	Buffalo Sabres	Hackett	1–0–0–0	2	W
2	October 11	3–3 OT	Pittsburgh Penguins	Esche	1–0–1–0	3	T
3	October 16	0–0 OT	@ San Jose Sharks	Hackett	1–0–2–0	4	T
4	October 18	5–4	@ Phoenix Coyotes	Hackett	2–0–2–0	6	W
5	October 21	0–4	@ Los Angeles Kings	Hackett	2–1–2–0	6	L
6	October 22	3–4 OT	@ Mighty Ducks of Anaheim	Esche	2–1–2–1	7	OTL
7	October 25	4–4 OT	Carolina Hurricanes	Hackett	2–1–3–1	8	T
8	October 27	5–0	Montreal Canadiens	Esche	3–1–3–1	10	W
9	October 29	5–1	Florida Panthers	Esche	4–1–3–1	12	W
10	October 30	2–3	@ New Jersey Devils	Hackett	4–2–3–1	12	L

November: 10–0–2–0, 22 points (home: 7–0–0–0; road: 3–0–2–0)

Game	Date	Score	Opponent	Decision	Record	Points	Recap
11	November 1	7–1	@ Toronto Maple Leafs	Esche	5–2–3–1	14	W
12	November 6	4–2	Washington Capitals	Esche	6–2–3–1	16	W
13	November 8	2–1 OT	@ New York Rangers	Hackett	7–2–3–1	18	W
14	November 11	2–1	New York Islanders	Hackett	8–2–3–1	20	W
15	November 13	4–3 OT	Vancouver Canucks	Esche	9–2–3–1	22	W
16	November 15	4–0	Atlanta Thrashers	Hackett	10–2–3–1	24	W
17	November 18	2–2 OT	@ Carolina Hurricanes	Hackett	10–2–4–1	25	T
18	November 20	3–1	Minnesota Wild	Esche	11–2–4–1	27	W
19	November 22	3–2	Boston Bruins	Hackett	12–2–4–1	29	W
20	November 26	1–1 OT	@ Pittsburgh Penguins	Esche	12–2–5–1	30	T
21	November 28	4–2	Carolina Hurricanes	Esche	13–2–5–1	32	W
22	November 29	5–1	@ New York Islanders	Hackett	14–2–5–1	34	W

December: 5–4–4–3, 17 points (home: 3–1–0–2; road: 2–3–4–1)

Game	Date	Score	Opponent	Decision	Record	Points	Recap
23	December 1	1–4	@ Ottawa Senators	Esche	14–3–5–1	34	L
24	December 3	5–2	Pittsburgh Penguins	Hackett	15–3–5–1	36	W
25	December 5	3–2	Phoenix Coyotes	Esche	16–3–5–1	38	W
26	December 6	1–1 OT	@ Boston Bruins	Hackett	16–3–6–1	39	T
27	December 8	3–2	@ Montreal Canadiens	Hackett	17–3–6–1	41	W
28	December 10	1–1 OT	@ Columbus Blue Jackets	Hackett	17–3–7–1	42	T
29	December 12	3–3 OT	@ New Jersey Devils	Hackett	17–3–8–1	43	T
30	December 13	0–2	New Jersey Devils	Hackett	17–4–8–1	43	L
31	December 16	2–3 OT	Calgary Flames	Hackett	17–4–8–2	44	OTL
32	December 18	4–5 OT	Tampa Bay Lightning	Hackett	17–4–8–3	45	OTL
33	December 20	3–1	New York Islanders	Esche	18–4–8–3	47	W
34	December 21	1–4	@ Atlanta Thrashers	Hackett	18–5–8–3	47	L
35	December 23	2–4	@ New York Islanders	Hackett	18–6–8–3	47	L
36	December 27	2–3 OT	@ Colorado Avalanche	Hackett	18–6–8–4	48	OTL
37	December 29	2–2 OT	@ Dallas Stars	Esche	18–6–9–4	49	T
38	December 30	7–2	@ St. Louis Blues	Esche	19–6–9–4	51	W

January: 7–5–2–1, 17 points (home: 2–3–0–1; road: 5–2–2–0)

Game	Date	Score	Opponent	Decision	Record	Points	Recap
39	January 2	2–1	@ Florida Panthers	Hackett	20–6–9–4	53	W
40	January 3	1–6	@ Tampa Bay Lightning	Esche	20–7–9–4	53	L
41	January 7	1–1 OT	@ Buffalo Sabres	Esche	20–7–10–4	54	T
42	January 8	3–4 OT	Florida Panthers	Hackett	20–7–10–5	55	OTL
43	January 10	0–3	Edmonton Oilers	Esche	20–8–10–5	55	L
44	January 12	1–2	Pittsburgh Penguins	Esche	20–9–10–5	55	L
45	January 13	2–6	@ Buffalo Sabres	Hackett	20–10–10–5	55	L
46	January 16	4–1	Toronto Maple Leafs	Esche	21–10–10–5	57	W
47	January 17	4–0	@ Toronto Maple Leafs	Esche	22–10–10–5	59	W
48	January 20	1–4	Montreal Canadiens	Esche	22–11–10–5	59	L
49	January 22	4–2	@ New York Rangers	Esche	23–11–10–5	61	W
50	January 24	2–1	Buffalo Sabres	Esche	24–11–10–5	63	W
51	January 25	4–1	@ Washington Capitals	Esche	25–11–10–5	65	W
52	January 28	3–3 OT	@ Florida Panthers	Esche	25–11–11–5	66	T
53	January 31	5–3	@ Pittsburgh Penguins	Esche	26–11–11–5	68	W

February: 7–5–1–1, 16 points (home: 5–3–0–0; road: 2–2–1–1)

Game	Date	Score	Opponent	Decision	Record	Points	Recap
54	February 2	1–2	Tampa Bay Lightning	Little	26–12–11–5	68	L
55	February 4	5–1	Washington Capitals	Niittymaki	27–12–11–5	70	W
56	February 5	5–1	@ Atlanta Thrashers	Niittymaki	28–12–11–5	72	W
57	February 10	4–1	New Jersey Devils	Niittymaki	29–12–11–5	74	W
58	February 12	2–1	@ New York Rangers	Burke	30–12–11–5	76	W
59	February 14	6–2	New York Rangers	Burke	31–12–11–5	78	W
60	February 16	2–5	San Jose Sharks	Burke	31–13–11–5	78	L
61	February 17	2–5	@ Tampa Bay Lightning	Burke	31–14–11–5	78	L
62	February 19	3–4	Boston Bruins	Burke	31–15–11–5	78	L
63	February 21	5–4	Atlanta Thrashers	Burke	32–15–11–5	80	W
64	February 24	3–1	Chicago Blackhawks	Burke	33–15–11–5	82	W
65	February 26	1–1 OT	@ Ottawa Senators	Burke	33–15–12–5	83	T
66	February 28	2–3 OT	@ Boston Bruins	Esche	33–15–12–6	84	OTL
67	February 29	2–4	@ Detroit Red Wings	Burke	33–16–12–6	84	L

March: 6–4–2–0, 14 points (home: 4–3–1–0; road: 2–1–1–0)

Game	Date	Score	Opponent	Decision	Record	Points	Recap
68	March 3	5–2	Nashville Predators	Esche	34–16–12–6	86	W
69	March 5	5–3	Ottawa Senators	Esche	35–16–12–6	88	W
70	March 6	1–2	@ Washington Capitals	Burke	35–17–12–6	88	L
71	March 9	3–1	@ New Jersey Devils	Esche	36–17–12–6	90	W
72	March 11	2–2 OT	Dallas Stars	Esche	36–17–13–6	91	T
73	March 13	2–1	New Jersey Devils	Esche	37–17–13–6	93	W
74	March 14	3–3 OT	@ Pittsburgh Penguins	Burke	37–17–14–6	94	T
75	March 18	2–3	Toronto Maple Leafs	Esche	37–18–14–6	94	L
76	March 20	3–0	New York Rangers	Esche	38–18–14–6	96	W
77	March 23	4–2	@ Carolina Hurricanes	Burke	39–18–14–6	98	W
78	March 25	2–4	New York Islanders	Esche	39–19–14–6	98	L
79	March 27	1–3	New York Rangers	Esche	39–20–14–6	98	L

April: 1–1–1–0, 3 points (home: 0–1–0–0; road: 1–0–1–0)

Game	Date	Score	Opponent	Decision	Record	Points	Recap
80	April 1	2–0	@ Montreal Canadiens	Burke	40–20–14–6	100	W
81	April 2	1–3	Ottawa Senators	Esche	40–21–14–6	100	L
82	April 4	3–3 OT	@ New York Islanders	Esche	40–21–15–6	101	T

Legend: W Win (2 points) L Loss (0 points) T Tie (1 point) OTL Overtime loss (1 point)

=== Playoffs ===
2004 Stanley Cup playoffs
Eastern Conference quarterfinals vs. New Jersey Devils – Flyers win 4–1

Game	Date	Score	Opponent	Decision	Attendance	Series	Recap
1	April 8	3–2	New Jersey Devils	Esche	19,608	Flyers lead 1–0	W
2	April 10	3–2	New Jersey Devils	Esche	19,779	Flyers lead 2–0	W
3	April 12	2–4	@ New Jersey Devils	Esche	18,023	Flyers lead 2–1	L
4	April 14	3–0	@ New Jersey Devils	Esche	19,040	Flyers lead 3–1	W
5	April 17	3–1	New Jersey Devils	Esche	19,778	Flyers win 4–1	W

Eastern Conference semifinals vs. Toronto Maple Leafs – Flyers win 4–2

Game	Date	Score	Opponent	Decision	Attendance	Series	Recap
1	April 22	3–1	Toronto Maple Leafs	Esche	19,447	Flyers lead 1–0	W
2	April 25	2–1	Toronto Maple Leafs	Esche	19,792	Flyers lead 2–0	W
3	April 28	1–4	@ Toronto Maple Leafs	Esche	19,628	Flyers lead 2–1	L
4	April 30	1–3	@ Toronto Maple Leafs	Esche	19,614	Series tied 2–2	L
5	May 2	7–2	Toronto Maple Leafs	Esche	19,825	Flyers lead 3–2	W
6	May 4	3–2 OT	@ Toronto Maple Leafs	Esche	19,625	Flyers win 4–2	W

Eastern Conference finals vs. Tampa Bay Lightning – Lightning win 4–3

Game	Date	Score	Opponent	Decision	Attendance	Series	Recap
1	May 8	1–3	@ Tampa Bay Lightning	Esche	21,425	Lightning lead 1–0	L
2	May 10	6–2	@ Tampa Bay Lightning	Esche	21,314	Series tied 1–1	W
3	May 13	1–4	Tampa Bay Lightning	Esche	19,897	Lightning lead 2–1	L
4	May 15	3–2	Tampa Bay Lightning	Esche	19,872	Series tied 2–2	W
5	May 18	2–4	@ Tampa Bay Lightning	Esche	21,517	Lightning lead 3–2	L
6	May 20	5–4 OT	Tampa Bay Lightning	Esche	19,910	Series tied 3–3	W
7	May 22	1–2	@ Tampa Bay Lightning	Esche	22,117	Lightning win 4–3	L

Legend: W Win L Loss

== Player statistics ==
=== Scoring ===
- Position abbreviations: C = Center; D = Defense; G = Goaltender; LW = Left wing; RW = Right wing
- † = Joined team via a transaction (e.g., trade, waivers, signing) during the season. Stats reflect time with the Flyers only.
- ‡ = Left team via a transaction (e.g., trade, waivers, release) during the season. Stats reflect time with the Flyers only.

No.	Player	Pos	Regular season						Playoffs					
No.	Player	Pos	GP	G	A	Pts	+/-	PIM	GP	G	A	Pts	+/-	PIM
8	Mark Recchi	LW	82	26	49	75	18	47	18	4	2	6	−3	4
26	Michal Handzus	C	82	20	38	58	18	82	18	5	5	10	7	7
10	John LeClair	LW	75	23	32	55	20	51	18	2	2	4	2	8
11	Tony Amonte	RW	80	20	33	53	13	38	18	3	5	8	7	6
97	Jeremy Roenick	C	62	19	28	47	1	62	18	4	9	13	4	8
12	Simon Gagne	LW	80	24	21	45	12	29	18	5	4	9	10	12
5	Kim Johnsson	D	80	13	29	42	16	26	15	2	6	8	−3	8
24	Sami Kapanen	RW	74	12	18	30	9	14	18	3	7	10	0	6
44	Joni Pitkanen	D	71	8	19	27	15	44	15	0	3	3	−6	6
14	Justin Williams‡	RW	47	6	20	26	10	32	—	—	—	—	—	—
25	Keith Primeau	C	54	7	15	22	11	80	18	9	7	16	11	22
23	Alexei Zhamnov†	C	20	5	13	18	7	14	18	4	10	14	−1	8
28	Marcus Ragnarsson	D	70	7	9	16	12	58	14	1	4	5	3	14
20	Radovan Somik	LW	53	4	10	14	−2	17	10	1	1	2	1	4
87	Donald Brashear	LW	64	6	7	13	−1	212	18	1	3	4	0	61
37	Eric Desjardins	D	48	1	11	12	11	28	—	—	—	—	—	—
6	Chris Therien‡	D	56	1	9	10	2	50	—	—	—	—	—	—
89	Mike Comrie†‡	C	21	4	5	9	2	12	—	—	—	—	—	—
2	Eric Weinrich‡	D	54	2	7	9	11	32	—	—	—	—	—	—
19	Branko Radivojevic†	RW	24	1	8	9	0	36	18	1	1	2	−1	32
13	Claude Lapointe	C	42	5	3	8	2	32	1	0	0	0	0	0
9 (Note: Sharp wore number 32 through January 28.)	Patrick Sharp	C	41	5	2	7	−3	55	12	1	0	1	−2	2
23	Jim Vandermeer‡	D	23	3	2	5	−5	25	—	—	—	—	—	—
55	Danny Markov†	D	34	2	3	5	0	58	18	1	2	3	17	25
29	Todd Fedoruk	LW	49	1	4	5	−4	136	1	0	0	0	−2	2
3	Mattias Timander†	D	34	1	4	5	13	19	18	2	4	6	2	6
19	Eric Chouinard‡	RW	17	3	0	3	−3	0	—	—	—	—	—	—
45	John Slaney	D	4	0	2	2	0	0	—	—	—	—	—	—
47	Kirby Law	RW	6	0	1	1	0	2	—	—	—	—	—	—
2	Vladimir Malakhov†	D	6	0	1	1	−1	2	17	1	5	6	9	12
41 (Note: Burke wore number 33 in his first game played after being acquired.)	Sean Burke†	G	15	0	0	0		0	1	0	0	0		0
42	Robert Esche	G	40	0	0	0		31	18	0	0	0		8
33	Jeff Hackett‡	G	27	0	0	0		0	—	—	—	—	—	—
51	Randy Jones	D	5	0	0	0	1	0	—	—	—	—	—	—
21	Boyd Kane	LW	7	0	0	0	−4	7	—	—	—	—	—	—
35	Neil Little	G	1	0	0	0		0	—	—	—	—	—	—
48	Freddy Meyer	D	1	0	0	0	0	0	—	—	—	—	—	—
30	Antero Niittymaki	G	3	0	0	0		0	—	—	—	—	—	—
22	Mike Peluso	RW	1	0	0	0	0	0	—	—	—	—	—	—
36	Dennis Seidenberg	D	5	0	0	0	−4	2	3	0	0	0	1	0
15	Peter White	C	3	0	0	0	−1	2	—	—	—	—	—	—

=== Goaltending ===
- † = Joined team via a transaction (e.g., trade, waivers, signing) during the season. Stats reflect time with the Flyers only.
- ‡ = Left team via a transaction (e.g., trade, waivers, release) during the season. Stats reflect time with the Flyers only.

No.	Player	Regular season											Playoffs									
No.	Player	GP	GS	W	L	T	SA	GA	GAA	SV%	SO	TOI	GP	GS	W	L	SA	GA	GAA	SV%	SO	TOI
42	Robert Esche	40	40	21	11	7	932	79	2.04	.915	3	2,322	18	18	11	7	498	41	2.32	.918	1	1,061
33	Jeff Hackett‡	27	26	10	10	6	684	65	2.39	.905	3	1,630	—	—	—	—	—	—	—	—	—	—
41	Sean Burke†	15	13	6	5	2	389	35	2.55	.910	1	825	1	0	0	0	9	1	1.50	.889	0	40
30	Antero Niittymaki	3	3	3	0	0	77	3	1.00	.961	0	180	—	—	—	—	—	—	—	—	—	—
35	Neil Little	1	0	0	1	0	8	2	3.61	.750	0	33	—	—	—	—	—	—	—	—	—	—

== Awards and records ==
=== Awards ===
Type	Award/honor	Recipient	Ref
League (annual)	NHL All-Rookie Team	Joni Pitkanen (Defense)	
League (in-season)	NHL All-Star Game selection	Ken Hitchcock (coach)	
League (in-season)	NHL All-Star Game selection	Keith Primeau	
League (in-season)	NHL All-Star Game selection	Jeremy Roenick	
League (in-season)	NHL Defensive Player of the Week	Robert Esche (November 3)	
League (in-season)	NHL Defensive Player of the Week	Robert Esche (March 15)	
League (in-season)	NHL YoungStars Game selection	Joni Pitkanen	
Team	Barry Ashbee Trophy	Kim Johnsson	
Team	Bobby Clarke Trophy	Mark Recchi	
Team	Pelle Lindbergh Memorial Trophy	Robert Esche	
Team	Toyota Cup	Mark Recchi	
Team	Yanick Dupre Memorial Class Guy Award	Sami Kapanen	

=== Records ===
The March 5, 2004 game against the Ottawa Senators set four NHL records. The Flyers set the records for most penalty minutes in a game (213) and most penalty minutes in a period (209). Likewise, both teams penalty minute totals set the combined game (419) and period (409) records. The Flyers 32 penalties during the third period set a franchise record.

=== Milestones ===
Milestone	Player	Date	Ref
First game	Joni Pitkanen	October 9, 2003	
First game	Boyd Kane	October 16, 2003	
First game	Antero Niittymaki	February 4, 2004	
First game	Randy Jones	March 6, 2004	
First game	Freddy Meyer	March 6, 2004	
25th shutout	Jeff Hackett	October 16, 2003	
500th game played	Jeff Hackett	January 13, 2004	
1,000th game played	Tony Amonte	March 5, 2004	

== Transactions ==
The Flyers were involved in the following transactions from June 10, 2003, the day after the deciding game of the 2003 Stanley Cup Final, through June 7, 2004, the day of the deciding game of the 2004 Stanley Cup Final.

=== Trades ===
Date	Details		Ref
June 22, 2003	To Philadelphia Flyers: 6th-round pick in 2004	To Carolina Hurricanes: Marty Murray	
June 22, 2003	To Philadelphia Flyers: 6th-round pick in 2004	To San Jose Sharks: 7th-round pick in 2003	
June 22, 2003	To Philadelphia Flyers: 6th-round pick in 2004	To Florida Panthers: 7th-round pick in 2003	
June 22, 2003	To Philadelphia Flyers: 7th-round pick in 2004; 9th-round pick in 2004	To Tampa Bay Lightning: 8th-round pick in 2003; 9th-round pick in 2003	
June 30, 2003	To Philadelphia Flyers: Conditional 7th-round pick in 2004 (Note: Condition not met.)	To Washington Capitals: Rights to Dmitri Yushkevich	
December 16, 2003	To Philadelphia Flyers: Rights to Mike Comrie	To Edmonton Oilers: Jeff Woywitka; 1st-round pick in 2004; 3rd-round pick in 2005	
December 17, 2003	To Philadelphia Flyers: 5th-round pick in 2004	To Minnesota Wild: Eric Chouinard	
January 20, 2004	To Philadelphia Flyers: Danny Markov	To Carolina Hurricanes: Justin Williams	
January 22, 2004	To Philadelphia Flyers: Mattias Timander	To New York Islanders: Tampa Bay's 7th-round pick in 2004	
February 9, 2004	To Philadelphia Flyers: 5th-round pick in 2004	To St. Louis Blues: Eric Weinrich	
February 9, 2004	To Philadelphia Flyers: Sean Burke; Branko Radivojevic; Rights to Ben Eager	To Phoenix Coyotes: Mike Comrie	
February 16, 2004	To Philadelphia Flyers: Steve Gainey	To Dallas Stars: Mike Siklenka	
February 19, 2004	To Philadelphia Flyers: Alexei Zhamnov; Washington's 4th-round pick in 2004	To Chicago Blackhawks: Jim Vandermeer; Rights to Colin Fraser; Los Angeles' 2nd-round pick in 2004	
March 8, 2004	To Philadelphia Flyers: Vladimir Malakhov	To New York Rangers: Rights to Rick Kozak; 2nd-round pick in 2005	
March 8, 2004	To Philadelphia Flyers: Phoenix's 8th-round pick in 2004; 3rd-round pick in 2005	To Dallas Stars: Chris Therien	

=== Players acquired ===
Date	Player	Former team	Term	Via	Ref
July 1, 2003	Jeff Hackett	Boston Bruins	2-year	Free agency	
July 14, 2003	Joey Hope	Portland Winter Hawks (WHL)		Free agency	
July 14, 2003	Boyd Kane	Tampa Bay Lightning		Free agency	
July 24, 2003	Randy Jones	Clarkson University (ECAC)	2-year	Free agency	
July 24, 2003	Mark Murphy	Washington Capitals	1-year	Free agency	
July 24, 2003	Mike Peluso	Chicago Blackhawks	1-year	Free agency	
October 21, 2003	Steve Webb	New York Islanders	1-year	Free agency	
November 5, 2003	Mike Siklenka	New York Rangers		Waivers	
March 20, 2004	Stephen Wood	Providence College (HE)		Free agency	

=== Players lost ===
Date	Player	New team	Via (Note: In parentheses is the player's free agency group on July 1 if applicable.)	Ref
July 1, 2003	David Harlock (Note: Harlock retired.)		Contract expiration (UFA)	
July 1, 2003	Joe Sacco (Note: Sacco retired.)		Contract expiration (III)	
August 19, 2003	Matt Zultek	Trenton Titans (ECHL)	Free agency (UFA)	
September 2, 2003	Jamie Wright	Edmonton Oilers	Free agency (UFA)	
September 11, 2003	Mike Lephart	Wilkes-Barre/Scranton Penguins (AHL)	Free agency (UFA)	
October 1, 2003	Ian Forbes	Florida Everblades (ECHL)	Free agency (UFA)	
October 3, 2003	Ryan Bast	Alaska Aces (ECHL)	Free agency (VI)	
October 3, 2003	Mike Siklenka	New York Rangers	Waiver draft	
October 22, 2003	Brad Tiley	Milwaukee Admirals (AHL)	Free agency (VI)	
October 22, 2003	Steve Webb	Pittsburgh Penguins	Waivers	
December 26, 2003	Dan Peters	Frankfurt Lions (DEL)	Free agency (VI)	
February 9, 2004	Jeff Hackett		Retirement	

=== Signings ===
Date	Player	Term	Contract type	Ref
June 10, 2003	Eric Chouinard	2-year	Re-signing	
June 10, 2003	Sami Kapanen	2-year	Re-signing	
June 30, 2003	Eric Desjardins	2-year (Note: Player option for a third year.)	Re-signing	
June 30, 2003	Claude Lapointe	2-year	Re-signing	
July 14, 2003	Mathieu Brunelle		Entry-level	
July 14, 2003	Mike Siklenka		Re-signing	
July 14, 2003	Peter Vandermeer		Re-signing	
July 14, 2003	Peter White		Re-signing	
July 15, 2003	Joni Pitkanen	3-year	Entry-level	
July 30, 2003	Radovan Somik	2-year	Re-signing	
July 30, 2003	Justin Williams	1-year	Re-signing	
December 20, 2003	Mike Comrie	1-year	Re-signing	
April 7, 2004	Ben Eager	3-year	Entry-level	

== Draft picks ==
Philadelphia's picks at the 2003 NHL entry draft, which was held at the Gaylord Entertainment Center in Nashville, Tennessee, on June 21–22, 2003. The Flyers traded their originally allotted second, fourth, fifth, seventh, eighth, and ninth-round draft picks in five different trades.

Round	Pick	Player	Position	Nationality	Team (league)	Notes
1	11	Jeff Carter	Center	Canada	Sault Ste. Marie Greyhounds (OHL)	(Note: The Phoenix Coyotes' first-round pick went to the Philadelphia Flyers as a result of a July 1, 2001 trade that sent Daymond Langkow to the Coyotes in exchange for a 2002 second-round pick and this pick.)
1	24	Mike Richards	Center	Canada	Kitchener Rangers (OHL)	
3	69	Colin Fraser	Center	Canada	Red Deer Rebels (WHL)	(Note: The Carolina Hurricanes' third-round pick went to the Philadelphia Flyers as a result of a June 22, 2002 trade that sent a 2002 third-round pick to the Hurricanes in exchange for a 2002 sixth-round pick and this pick.)
3	81	Stefan Ruzicka	Right wing	Slovakia	MHC Nitra (Slovakia)	(Note: The New York Rangers' third-round pick went to the Philadelphia Flyers as a result of an August 20, 2001 trade that sent Eric Lindros to the Rangers in exchange for Kim Johnsson, Pavel Brendl, Jan Hlavac and this pick.)
3	85	Alexandre Picard	Defense	Canada	Halifax Mooseheads (QMJHL)	(Note: Compensatory pick received from NHL as compensation for Group III free agent Adam Oates.)
3	87	Ryan Potulny	Center	United States	Lincoln Stars (USHL)	(Note: The Edmonton Oilers' third-round pick went to the Philadelphia Flyers as a result of a June 18, 2002 trade that sent Jiri Dopita to the Oilers in exchange for this pick.)
3	95	Rick Kozak	Right wing	Canada	Brandon Wheat Kings (WHL)	
4	108	Kevin Romy	Center	Switzerland	Geneve-Servette HC (NLA)	(Note: Compensatory pick received from NHL as compensation for Group III free agent Luke Richardson.)
5	140	David Tremblay	Goaltender	Canada	Hull Olympiques (QMJHL)	(Note: The Columbus Blue Jackets' fifth-round pick went to the Philadelphia Flyers as a result of a June 23, 2002 trade that sent a 2002 sixth round pick and a 2002 seventh round pick to the Blue Jackets in exchange for this pick.)
6	191	Rejean Beauchemin	Goaltender	Canada	Prince Albert Raiders (WHL)	
6	193	Ville Hostikka	Goaltender	Finland	SaiPa Jrs. (FIN)	(Note: The Colorado Avalanche's sixth-round pick went to the Philadelphia Flyers as a result of a February 5, 2003 trade that sent Chris McAllister to the Avalanche in exchange for this pick.)

== Farm teams ==
The Flyers were affiliated with the Philadelphia Phantoms of the AHL and the Trenton Titans of the ECHL.

== See also ==
- Flyers–Senators brawl
