= Philadelphia Flyers–Ottawa Senators brawl =

Hockey game

Flyers–Senators brawl
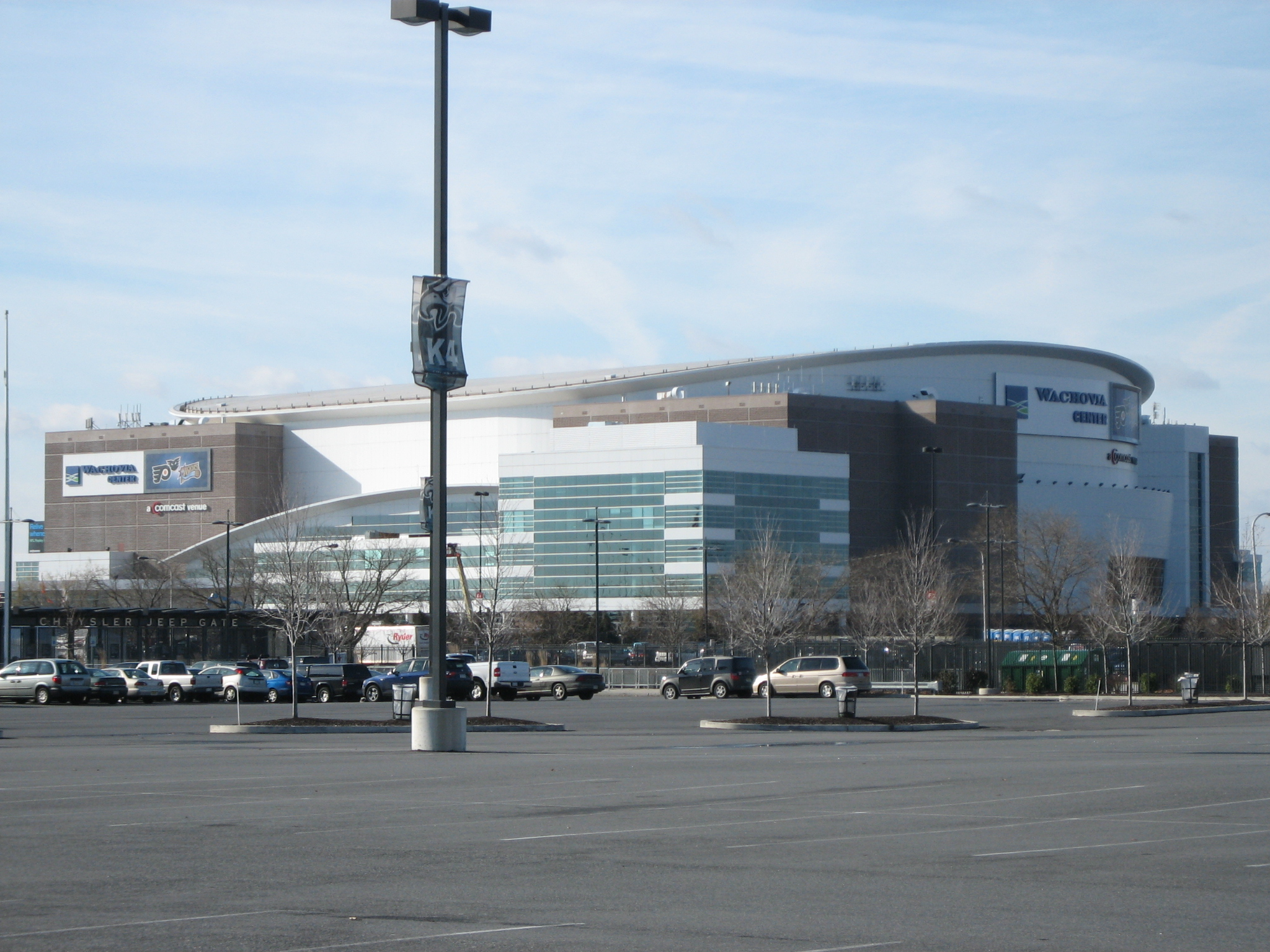
- The Wachovia Center, where the game took place.
	1	2	3	Total
Ottawa Senators	1	1	1	3
Philadelphia Flyers	3	1	1	5
- Date: March 5, 2004
- Arena: Wachovia Center
- City: Philadelphia
- Attendance: 19,539

The Flyers–Senators brawl was a National Hockey League (NHL) regular season game between the Philadelphia Flyers and the Ottawa Senators that resulted in a league record for penalty minutes. The game was played on March 5, 2004, at the Wachovia Center, the home arena of the Flyers. Philadelphia won the game 5–3. In all, 419 minutes were assessed, passing the previous NHL record of 406. The 213 minutes assessed against Philadelphia was also a record, as was the number of penalty minutes in the third period.

The events were precipitated by an incident in the previous meeting between the two teams, when Ottawa's Martin Havlat had swung his stick at Mark Recchi's head. Just under two minutes before the end of the game, enforcers Donald Brashear of the Flyers and Rob Ray of the Senators engaged in a fight. As they skated off to the penalty box, Brashear became involved in another scrap, and the rest of the players on the ice for each team, including goaltenders Robert Esche and Patrick Lalime, began to fight. On both of the next two face-offs to restart the game, further fights occurred. The first of these angered the Flyers management, who believed that the fights were deliberately unbalanced against their players.

On the third restart after the initial fight, the crowd booed when a fight did not immediately ensue, but in less than 30 seconds, two more fights had broken out. The final fight occurred directly after the fourth face-off, involving Jason Spezza and Patrick Sharp. Spezza and Brashear were assessed for the most penalty minutes in the game, receiving 35 and 34, respectively. At the start of the 2005–06 season, the NHL introduced a rule that punished anyone instigating a fight in the final five minutes of a game with a one-game suspension, in order to prevent similar incidents occurring in the future.

== Background ==
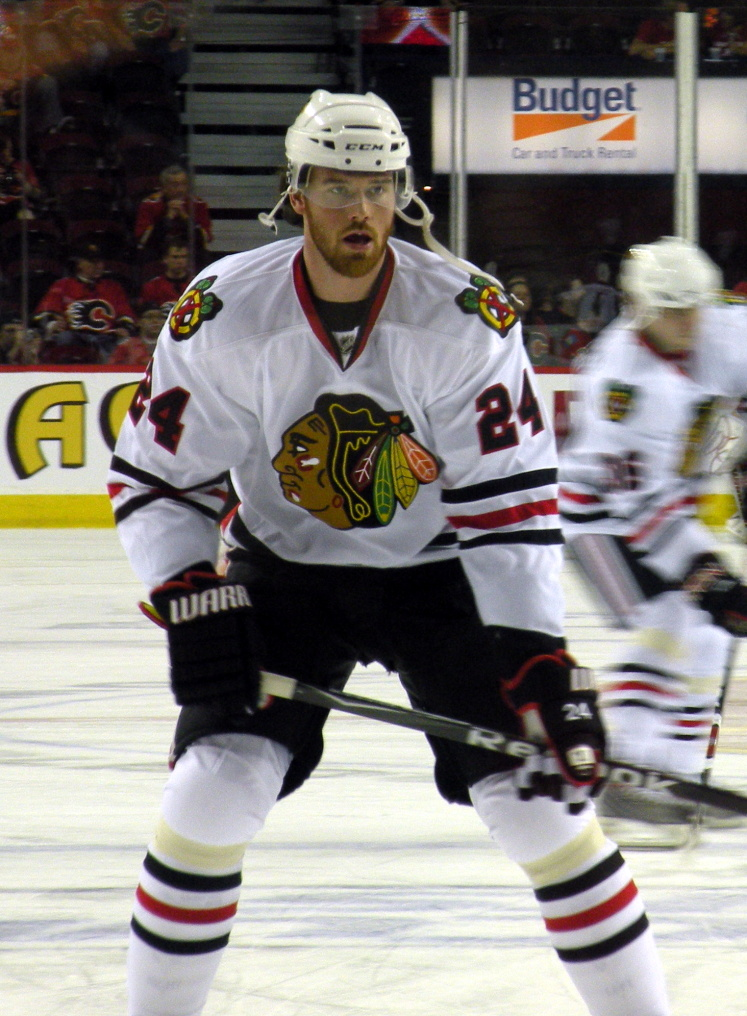
In the previous game between the two sides, the Flyers were angered by a slash by Martin Havlát of the Senators.

In each of the previous two seasons, the Philadelphia Flyers and the Ottawa Senators had met in the Stanley Cup playoffs, and the Senators had eliminated the Flyers both times – in five games in the 2002 Eastern Conference Quarterfinals, and in six games in the 2003 Eastern Conference Semifinals. The Flyers had not beaten the Senators in their previous five regular-season contests, going 0–2–3.

When the two sides met in late-February, a week before the brawl game, during the third period, Flyers winger Mark Recchi was following Martin Havlát of the Senators when he crossed into the Philadelphia defensive zone. As this happened, Recchi hooked Havlat, causing both of the players to collide and fall into the boards. When Havlat got up from the ice, angered by Recchi's hook, he took his stick above him and slashed Recchi, hitting him in the face.

Havlat was given a five-minute major penalty for attempting to injure Recchi and a game misconduct penalty. He was later given a two-game suspension by the NHL due to the incident. As a repeat offender, he was forced to give up US$36,585.36 of his salary as he had already been suspended for kicking Eric Cairns of the New York Islanders earlier in the season.

Revenge was mentioned after the game by Flyers head coach Ken Hitchcock. During a post-game interview with the Canadian Broadcasting Corporation (CBC), he commented that "someday, someone's going to make him eat his lunch. This is something, in my opinion, that the players should take care of." Recchi also mentioned revenge, not specifically from the Flyers, during an interview with the CBC. "It doesn't surprise me coming from this guy. He's that type of player. He's done it before. It might not come from our team. But he better protect himself," said Recchi.

== Game summary ==
Despite having what Rob Maaddi of the Associated Press described as "bad blood" between them, the first period of the game passed without serious incident. Chris Neil opened the scoring for Ottawa just over four minutes into the period, but the Flyers then took the lead when Claude Lapointe and Mark Recchi scored 30 seconds apart. Danny Markov added a third for Philadelphia to give them a two-goal lead. The only penalty assessed in the period was for holding against Philadelphia's Tony Amonte, who was appearing in his 1,000th NHL game.

Both teams scored a goal each in the second and third periods. In the second period, an early tripping penalty against Ottawa's Mike Fisher put the Flyers on the power play, during which Kim Johnsson extended Philadelphia's lead to 4–1. Ottawa received another penalty less than a minute later, which sent Todd Simpson to the penalty box for holding. A Flyers penalty against Radovan Somík for slashing Martin Havlat resulted in a power play goal for the Senators' Zdeno Chára, closing the score to a two-goal gap once again. Fisher subsequently received his second penalty of the game, this time for high-sticking.

The third period began with Alexei Zhamnov notching the Flyers' fifth goal of the game to make it 5–2. Shortly thereafter, the game started to become more heated; Zhamnov and Daniel Alfredsson were assessed coincidental minors for roughing nine minutes into the period, and three minutes later Bryan Smolinski and Mark Greig were similarly penalized. Simpson returned to the box soon after, for slashing Michal Handzuš, but Philadelphia's power play was cut short when they received a penalty for having too many men on the ice.

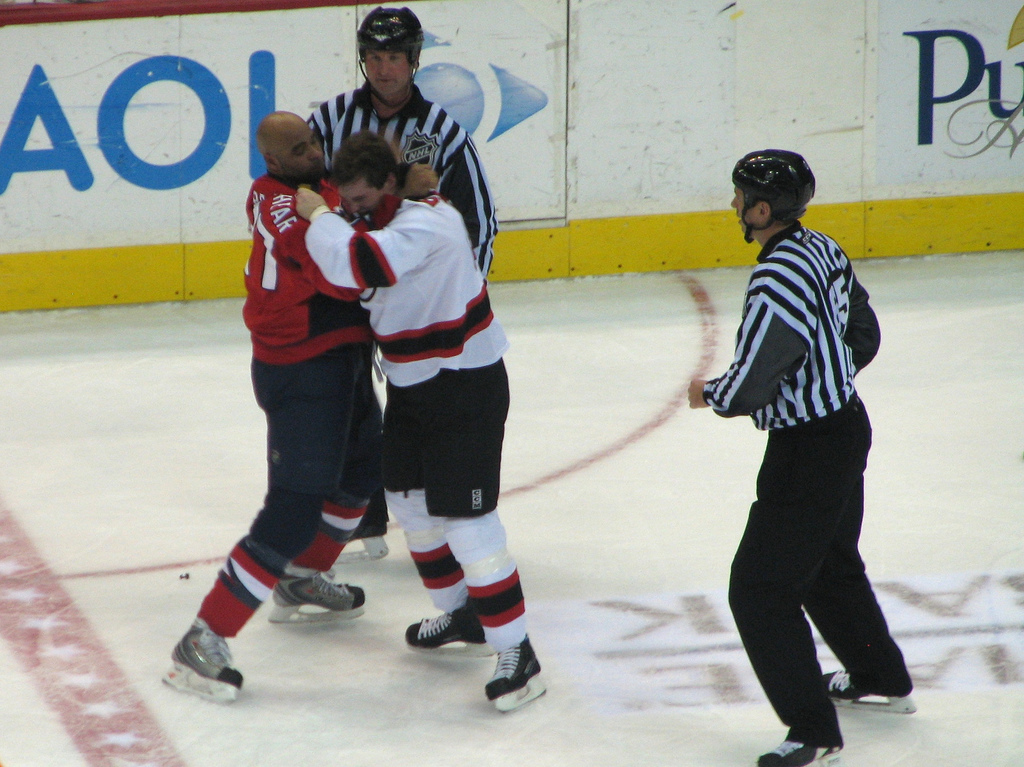
Donald Brashear (left, playing for the Washington Capitals) instigated the fight which started the brawl.

With 1:45 left in regulation time, Flyers' enforcer Donald Brashear hit Rob Ray, an enforcer for the Senators, from behind, instigating a fight between the pair. When he was asked after the game why he started the fight, Brashear replied with his own question: "Did you see the last game?" His reply was interpreted as being a reference to Havlat's slashing penalty against Recchi. Brashear was generally considered to win the fight, with Tim Panaccio of The Philadelphia Inquirer claiming that Brashear "destroyed Rob Ray." The fight left Ray bloodied, and as Brashear was being escorted off the ice by the linesman, he exchanged blows with both Brian Pothier and Todd Simpson. Philadelphia's Patrick Sharp attempted to restrain Simpson, who then pushed Sharp to the ice and started throwing punches at him. Markov intervened, and he fought Simpson. At the same time, Branko Radivojevic and Shaun Van Allen had paired off for a fight, and Ottawa's goaltender, Patrick Lalime, skated the length of the ice to fight fellow goaltender Robert Esche; both received penalties for leaving their crease as well as fighting majors.

The game restarted with two new goaltenders, and the Senators on the power play, but within three seconds, the fighting started again — Ottawa's Chris Neil poked Radovan Somik with his stick, and the pair started scrapping. At the same time, Zdeno Chara started a fight with the Flyers' Mattias Timander, for which the former received an instigator penalty. Both fights angered Philadelphia head coach Ken Hitchcock, who claimed that, "Their tough guy [Rob Ray] got beat up and then their next two lines fought guys who don't fight." Flyer general manager Bob Clarke was also critical, saying, "I understand Rob Ray fighting Donald Brashear. That's okay. [...] But don't go after guys who don't know how to defend themselves like Somik and Timander." As Chara had been ejected from the game, his penalty was served by Martin Havlat, who had been placed there to protect him from any possible attempts at retribution. Chara's penalty meant that at the next restart, the teams were back to even strength, with four players each. Immediately after the ensuing face-off, Michal Handzus and Mike Fisher took part in the seventh fight of the game.

There were no fights straight after the next restart, which resulted in booing from the crowd. Within 24 seconds of that restart, the crowd had their way; Mark Recchi hit Wade Redden, who immediately launched himself into a fight with John LeClair. While those two fought, Recchi and Bryan Smolinski engaged in a second fight in the middle of the rink. LeClair received an additional penalty for holding, placing the Senators on the power play. At the next face-off, a fight once again broke out straight away, between Jason Spezza and Patrick Sharp. Spezza received a fighting major, a misconduct and double game misconduct, totalling 35 penalty minutes, the most of any player in the game.

The rest of the game proceeded without any fights; the Flyers only had three players left on their bench, while the Senators had two. The Senators tallied the final goal of the game with 13 seconds remaining, with Peter Bondra scoring on the power play to make the final score 5–3. At the end of the game, it took the officials 90 minutes to allocate all the penalties that had been given to the two sides. The two teams combined for 419 penalty minutes, an NHL record, breaking the previous total of 406 in a 1981 game between the Boston Bruins and the Minnesota North Stars. Philadelphia's 213 penalty minutes was also a new League record, as were the 409 minutes assessed in the third period. Interviewed after the game, Mike Fisher of Ottawa said that the Senators "knew [they] had to fight back. [They] had to stand up for each other."

== Aftermath ==
The media drew comparisons between the game and the "Broad Street Bullies" era of the Philadelphia Flyers in the 1970s, when they played very aggressive hockey with numerous fights. At the conclusion of the game Bobby Clarke, Philadelphia's general manager, attempted to enter the Senators' dressing room to confront their head coach, Jacques Martin, but was restrained by a colleague. Clarke said that he would not have hit Martin, but that he had wanted to challenge Martin about the unbalanced fight pairings. Clarke subsequently lodged a complaint with league supervisor Claude Loiselle. The only player to receive a fine or suspension as a result of the game was Danny Markov, who got a statutory one-game ban for collecting his third game misconduct of the season.

Philadelphia-based Comcast SportsNet (CSN), which had aired the game live, described it as an "instant classic," replayed the game the following Wednesday (March 10). The replay received a Nielsen rating of 1.0, a higher figure than most telecasts involving the Philadelphia Flyers. League officials from the NHL were unhappy with the replay being shown, as they perceived the game to tarnish the League's image, and they requested that CSN not replay the game again.

The Flyers and the Senators met once more during the season, and despite some claims from Bobby Clarke that Philadelphia would seek further revenge, there were only six minor penalties assessed in the match, which the Senators won 3–1. Ottawa defenceman Zdeno Chara explained that "both teams were really focusing on the two points. We weren't going to risk that by fighting." Both teams qualified for the 2004 playoffs; Ottawa was eliminated in the first-round by the Toronto Maple Leafs, while Philadelphia defeated the New Jersey Devils and Maple Leafs to reach the Eastern Conference Finals, but were then eliminated in 7 games by the eventual Stanley Cup champions, the Tampa Bay Lightning.

The brawl, along with an incident that occurred 3 days later, between the Vancouver Canucks' Todd Bertuzzi and Steve Moore of the Colorado Avalanche (in which Bertuzzi hit Moore from behind, breaking his neck, in retaliation for a hit by Moore on one of Bertuzzi's team-mates a month earlier), brought the issue of violence in ice hockey into focus. Particular attention was given to retaliation; when Brashear was interviewed on the subject of the Bertuzzi incident, he defended such on-ice revenge, and suggested that Bertuzzi should not receive a suspension, because "all they have to do is go after him when he comes back." That mindset echoed the comments made by Ken Hitchcock and Mark Recchi about Martin Havlat, and Sam Donnellon of the Philadelphia Daily News suggested that it was prevailing opinion amongst all the players in the League. He suggested that rather than wanting stricter penalties to clamp down on dangerous play, (which he advocated), the players believed that removing the penalty for instigating a fight, and allowing players to therefore get their retribution by that means, would have the same effect. Mike Heika of The Dallas Morning News also believed that the league should be stricter in handing out fines and suspensions, suggesting that Hitchcock should possibly have been penalised for his revenge comments, and that if Havlat had received a lengthier ban for his actions, the brawl between the Flyers and Senators may not have happened.

During that hockey season, the ECHL (a minor league at the AA level) implemented a new rule where any player assessed for an instigator penalty in the last five minutes of a match would be assessed both a game misconduct penalty and one-game suspension. In the ensuing NHL season in October 2005, the ECHL rule, with an additional fine on the offending player's head coach of $10,000, was implemented. This was designed to avoid situations such as happened in game between the Flyers and Senators, and addressed the fact that physical play tended to increase towards the end of a game, particularly when the result was not in question.

In an article on The Athletic marking the brawl's 20th anniversary, Sean McIndoe wrote, "We all agree that this 419 PIM record is completely fake, right? This was a wild game and there were several fights, but it absolutely has no place alongside some of those 1980s and 1990[s] bench clearers. This is just two referees getting ticked off and turning this car right around."

== Boxscore ==
March 5, 2004	Ottawa Senators	3–5	Philadelphia Flyers	Wachovia Center	Recap

Scoring summary
Period	Team	Goal	Assist(s)	Time	Score
1st	OTT	Chris Neil (8)	Todd Simpson (4) and Martin Havlat (31)	03:29	1–0 OTT
1st	PHI	Claude Lapointe (4)	Radovan Somik (9) and John Slaney (1)	10:41	1–1
1st	PHI	Mark Recchi (25)	John LeClair (24) and Michal Handzus (32)	11:11	2–1 PHI
1st	PHI	Danny Markov (6)	Michal Handzus (33)	16:10	3–1 PHI
2nd	PHI	Kim Johnsson (9) – pp	Alexei Zhamnov (17) and John Slaney (2)	05:22	4–1 PHI
2nd	OTT	Zdeno Chara (15) – pp	Jason Spezza (29) and Peter Schaefer (20)	10:41	4–2 PHI
3rd	PHI	Alexei Zhamnov (10)	Simon Gagne (20) and Tony Amonte (28)	05:22	5–2 PHI
3rd	OTT	Peter Bondra (24) – pp	Daniel Alfredsson (40) and Peter Schaefer (21)	19:47	5–3 PHI
Penalty summary
Period	Team	Player	Penalty	Time	PIM
1st	PHI	Tony Amonte	Holding – Obstruction	05:17	2:00
2nd	OTT	Mike Fisher	Tripping	03:57	2:00
2nd	OTT	Todd Simpson	Holding	06:06	2:00
2nd	PHI	Radovan Somik	Slashing	13:08	2:00
2nd	OTT	Mike Fisher	High-sticking	17:07	2:00
3rd	OTT	Daniel Alfredsson	Roughing	09:03	2:00
3rd	PHI	Alexei Zhamnov	Roughing	09:03	2:00
3rd	OTT	Bryan Smolinski	Roughing	12:18	2:00
3rd	PHI	Patrick Sharp	Roughing	12:18	2:00
3rd	OTT	Todd Simpson	Slashing	14:21	2:00
3rd	PHI	Bench (served by Patrick Sharp)	Too many men on the ice	15:57	2:00
3rd	OTT	Rob Ray	Fighting – major	18:15	5:00
3rd	OTT	Shaun Van Allen	Fighting – major	18:15	5:00
3rd	OTT	Shaun Van Allen	Double game misconduct	18:15	20:00
3rd	OTT	Patrick Lalime	Leaving the crease	18:15	2:00
3rd	OTT	Patrick Lalime	Fighting – major	18:15	5:00
3rd	OTT	Patrick Lalime	Game misconduct	18:15	10:00
3rd	OTT	Todd Simpson	Fighting – major	18:15	5:00
3rd	OTT	Todd Simpson	Game misconduct	18:15	10:00
3rd	PHI	Donald Brashear	Instigator	18:15	2:00
3rd	PHI	Donald Brashear	Roughing	18:15	2:00
3rd	PHI	Donald Brashear	Fighting – double major	18:15	10:00
3rd	PHI	Donald Brashear	Misconduct	18:15	10:00
3rd	PHI	Donald Brashear	Game misconduct	18:15	10:00
3rd	PHI	Danny Markov	Fighting – major	18:15	5:00
3rd	PHI	Danny Markov	Game misconduct	18:15	10:00
3rd	PHI	Robert Esche	Leaving the crease	18:15	2:00
3rd	PHI	Robert Esche	Fighting – major	18:15	5:00
3rd	PHI	Robert Esche	Double game misconduct	18:15	20:00
3rd	PHI	Branko Radivojevic	Fighting – major	18:15	5:00
3rd	PHI	Branko Radivojevic	Double game misconduct	18:15	20:00
3rd	OTT	Zdeno Chara	Instigator	18:18	2:00
3rd	OTT	Zdeno Chara	Fighting – major	18:18	5:00
3rd	OTT	Zdeno Chara	Misconduct	18:18	10:00
3rd	OTT	Zdeno Chara	Game misconduct	18:18	10:00
3rd	OTT	Chris Neil	Fighting – major	18:18	5:00
3rd	PHI	Mattias Timander	Fighting – major	18:18	5:00
3rd	PHI	Radovan Somik	Fighting – major	18:18	5:00
3rd	OTT	Mike Fisher	Fighting – major	18:21	5:00
3rd	OTT	Mike Fisher	Misconduct	18:21	10:00
3rd	OTT	Mike Fisher	Game misconduct	18:21	10:00
3rd	PHI	Michal Handzus	Fighting – major	18:21	5:00
3rd	PHI	Michal Handzus	Misconduct	18:21	10:00
3rd	OTT	Michal Handzus	Game misconduct	18:21	10:00
3rd	OTT	Bryan Smolinski	Fighting – major	18:45	5:00
3rd	OTT	Bryan Smolinski	Game misconduct	18:45	10:00
3rd	OTT	Wade Redden	Fighting – major	18:45	5:00
3rd	OTT	Wade Redden	Misconduct	18:45	10:00
3rd	OTT	Wade Redden	Game misconduct	18:45	10:00
3rd	PHI	John LeClair	Holding	18:45	2:00
3rd	PHI	John LeClair	Fighting – major	18:45	5:00
3rd	PHI	John LeClair	Misconduct	18:45	10:00
3rd	PHI	John LeClair	Game misconduct	18:45	10:00
3rd	PHI	Mark Recchi	Fighting – major	18:45	5:00
3rd	PHI	Mark Recchi	Game misconduct	18:45	10:00
3rd	OTT	Jason Spezza	Fighting – major	18:47	5:00
3rd	OTT	Jason Spezza	Misconduct	18:47	10:00
3rd	OTT	Jason Spezza	Double game misconduct	18:47	20:00
3rd	PHI	Patrick Sharp	Fighting – major	18:47	5:00
3rd	PHI	Patrick Sharp	Misconduct	18:47	10:00
3rd	PHI	Patrick Sharp	Game misconduct	18:47	10:00

Shots by period
Team	1	2	3	Total
Ottawa	7	9	10	26
Philadelphia	13	11	6	30

Power play opportunities
Team	Goals/Opportunities
Ottawa	2/6
Philadelphia	1/4

Three star selections
	Team	Player	Statistics
1st	PHI	Kim Johnsson	1 goal
2nd	PHI	Michal Handzus	2 assists
3rd	PHI	Danny Markov	1 goals

== Team rosters ==
Ottawa Senators
#	Player	Position	PIM
2	Brian Pothier	D	0
3	Zdeno Chara	D	27
4	Chris Phillips	D	0
6	Wade Redden	D	25
9	Martin Havlat	LW	0
10	Peter Bondra	RW	0
11	Daniel Alfredsson	RW	2
12	Mike Fisher	C	29
15	Peter Schaefer	LW	0
18	Marian Hossa	RW	0
20	Antoine Vermette	C	0
21	Bryan Smolinski	C	17
22	Shaun Van Allen	C	25
23	Karel Rachunek	D	0
25	Chris Neil	RW	5
27	Todd Simpson	D	19
31	Martin Prusek	G	0
32	Rob Ray	RW	5
39	Jason Spezza	C	35
40	Patrick Lalime	G	17
Head coach: Jacques Martin

Philadelphia Flyers
#	Player	Position	PIM
3	Mattias Timander	D	5
5	Kim Johnsson	D	0
6	Chris Therien	D	0
8	Mark Recchi	RW	15
9	Patrick Sharp	LW	27
10	John LeClair	LW	27
11	Tony Amonte	RW	2
12	Simon Gagne	LW	0
13	Claude Lapointe	C	0
19	Branko Radivojevic	RW	25
20	Radovan Somik	RW	7
23	Alexei Zhamnov	C	2
24	Sami Kapanen	RW	0
26	Michal Handzus	C	25
41	Sean Burke	G	0
42	Robert Esche	G	27
44	Joni Pitkanen	D	0
45	John Slaney	D	0
55	Danny Markov	D	15
87	Donald Brashear	LW	34
Head coach: Ken Hitchcock

=== Scratches ===
- Ottawa Senators: Curtis Leschyshyn, Radek Bonk, Anton Volchenkov, Vaclav Varada, Todd White, Shane Hnidy
- Philadelphia Flyers: Keith Primeau, Marcus Ragnarsson, Todd Fedoruk, Dennis Seidenberg, Eric Desjardins, Jeremy Roenick

=== Officials ===
- Referees: Marc Joannette, Dan Marouelli
- Linesmen: Jonny Murray, Tim Nowak

== See also ==
- Punch-up in Piestany
- Colorado Avalanche-Red Wings brawl
- Pittsburgh Penguins-New York Islanders brawl
