= 2003–04 New Jersey Devils season =

National Hockey League season

2003–04 New Jersey Devils
- Division: 2nd Atlantic
- Conference: 6th Eastern
- 2003–04 record: 43–25–12–2
- Home record: 22–13–5–1
- Road record: 21–12–7–1
- Goals for: 213
- Goals against: 164

Team information
- General manager: Lou Lamoriello
- Coach: Pat Burns
- Captain: Scott Stevens; Scott Niedermayer (interim, Jan.–Apr.)
- Alternate captains: Patrik Elias; John Madden (Jan.–Apr.); Scott Niedermayer (Oct.–Jan.)
- Arena: Continental Airlines Arena
- Average attendance: 15,059
- Minor league affiliate: Albany River Rats

Team leaders
- Goals: Patrik Elias (38)
- Assists: Scott Gomez (56)
- Points: Patrik Elias (81)
- Penalty minutes: Colin White (96)
- Plus/minus: Patrik Elias (+26)
- Wins: Martin Brodeur (38)
- Goals against average: Martin Brodeur (2.03)

The 2003–04 New Jersey Devils season was the 30th season for the National Hockey League (NHL) franchise that was established on June 11, 1974, and 22nd season since the franchise relocated from Colorado prior to the 1982–83 NHL season.

Like the 2001–02 NHL season, the Devils finished 6th in the Eastern Conference and were eliminated in the first round of the playoffs. The team started the season really impressive, winning 17 of their first 30 games. However, in the 2004 calendar year, they were 24–19–4–1, causing them to finish sixth in the conference, second in the division and lose to one of their division rivals, the Philadelphia Flyers in five games in the quarterfinals. They were also marred by injured defenseman Scott Stevens and Brian Rafalski which also caused them to be eliminated in the first round of the playoffs.

== Regular season ==
The defending Stanley Cup champions, the Devils only allowed 164 goals, the lowest total ever allowed by a team under the 82-game regular-season format. The Devils also shut out their opponents 14 times, a league-high. Furthermore, they were the most disciplined team in the League, finishing with the regular season with the fewest power-play opportunities against (266) and the fewest power-play goals allowed (39).

Defenseman Scott Stevens exited the lineup in January with what was first reported to be the flu, but was later diagnosed as post-concussion syndrome. With Stevens out indefinitely, Scott Niedermayer served as interim captain for the remainder of the season.

- March 23, 2004 – In an overtime victory over the Florida Panthers, Martin Brodeur earned his 400th career victory. At the time, he was the youngest goalie to win 400 career games.

=== Final standings ===
Atlantic Division
No.	CR		GP	W	L	T	OTL	GF	GA	PTS
1	3	**Philadelphia Flyers**	82	40	21	15	6	229	186	101
2	6	**New Jersey Devils**	82	43	25	12	2	213	164	100
3	8	**New York Islanders**	82	38	29	11	4	237	210	91
4	13	New York Rangers	82	27	40	7	8	206	250	69
5	15	Pittsburgh Penguins	82	23	47	8	4	190	303	58

Note: CR = Conference rank; GP = Games played; W = Wins; L = Losses; T = Ties; OTL = Overtime loss; GF = Goals for; GA = Goals against; Pts = Points
Bolded teams qualified for the playoffs.

Eastern Conference
R		Div	GP	W	L	T	OTL	GF	GA	Pts
**1**	**Z-** Tampa Bay Lightning	**SE**	**82**	**46**	**22**	**8**	**6**	**245**	**192**	106
**2**	**Y-** Boston Bruins	**NE**	**82**	**41**	**19**	**15**	**7**	**209**	**188**	104
**3**	**Y-** Philadelphia Flyers	**AT**	**82**	**40**	**21**	**15**	**6**	**209**	**188**	101
**4**	**X-** Toronto Maple Leafs	**NE**	**82**	**45**	**24**	**10**	**3**	**242**	**204**	103
**5**	**X-** Ottawa Senators	**NE**	**82**	**43**	**23**	**10**	**6**	**262**	**189**	102
**6**	**X-** New Jersey Devils	**AT**	**82**	**43**	**25**	**12**	**2**	**213**	**164**	100
**7**	**X-** Montreal Canadiens	**NE**	**82**	**41**	**30**	**7**	**4**	**208**	**192**	93
**8**	**X-** New York Islanders	**AT**	**82**	**38**	**29**	**11**	**4**	**237**	**210**	91
8.5
9	Buffalo Sabres	NE	82	37	34	7	4	220	221	85
10	Atlanta Thrashers	SE	82	33	37	8	4	214	243	78
11	Carolina Hurricanes	SE	82	28	34	14	6	172	209	76
12	Florida Panthers	SE	82	28	35	15	4	188	221	75
13	New York Rangers	AT	82	27	40	7	8	206	250	69
14	Washington Capitals	SE	82	23	46	10	3	186	253	59
15	Pittsburgh Penguins	AT	82	23	47	8	4	190	303	58

Divisions: AT – Atlantic, NE – Northeast, SE – Southeast

Z – Clinched conference; Y – Clinched division; X – Clinched playoff spot

== Playoffs ==
=== Eastern Conference Quarterfinals ===
==== (E6) New Jersey Devils vs. (E3) Philadelphia Flyers ====
The series opened at Wachovia Center in Philadelphia, and the Flyers won both games 1 and 2 3–2 over New Jersey. Games three and four were played at Continental Airlines Arena in New Jersey. The Devils won game three 4–2, but the Flyers were victorious in game four by a score of 3–0. Game five was played back in Philadelphia, and the Flyers won that game 3-1 and won the series 4 games to 1.

== Schedule and results ==
=== Preseason ===
2003 preseason
Preseason: 3–6–0 (home: 1–2–0; road: 2–4–0)

Game	Date	Score	Opponent	Location	Record	Recap
1	September 19	6–1	Philadelphia Flyers	Wachovia Center	0–1–0	L
2	September 23	3–0	Philadelphia Flyers	Sovereign Bank Arena	1–1–0	W
3	September 24	2–1	New York Islanders	Continental Airlines Arena	1–2–0	L
4	September 26	4–5 (OT)	Philadelphia Flyers	Wachovia Center	1–3–0	L
5	September 27	4–2	Philadelphia Flyers	Continental Airlines Arena	2–3–0	W
6	September 30	1–0	Boston Bruins	Dunkin' Donuts Center	2–4–0	L
7	October 1	4–2	New York Rangers	Madison Square Garden	3–4–0	W
8	October 3	2–0	New York Rangers	Continental Airlines Arena	3–5–0	L
9	October 4	5–1	New York Islanders	Nassau Veterans Memorial Coliseum	3–6–0	L

Legend: W Win (2 points) L Loss (0 points) T Tie (1 point) OTL Overtime loss (1 point)

=== Regular season ===
2003–04 regular season
October: 4–3–2–0 (home: 1–3–1–0; road: 3–0–1–0)

Game	Date	Score	Opponent	Record	Points	Recap
1	October 8, 2003	3–3 OT	@ Boston Bruins (2003–04)	0–0–1–0	1	T
2	October 11, 2003	2–1	@ Carolina Hurricanes (2003–04)	1–0–1–0	3	W
3	October 16, 2003	2–2 OT	Toronto Maple Leafs (2003–04)	1–0–2–0	4	T
4	October 18, 2003	2–3	Tampa Bay Lightning (2003–04)	1–1–2–0	4	L
5	October 22, 2003	1–2	Florida Panthers (2003–04)	1–2–2–0	4	L
6	October 24, 2003	2–1	@ Pittsburgh Penguins (2003–04)	2–2–2–0	6	W
7	October 25, 2003	2–5	Boston Bruins (2003–04)	2–3–2–0	6	L
8	October 28, 2003	4–0	@ New York Islanders (2003–04)	3–3–2–0	8	W
9	October 30, 2003	3–2	Philadelphia Flyers (2003–04)	4–3–2–0	10	W

November: 8–1–4–0 (home: 6–0–1–0; road: 2–1–3–0)

Game	Date	Score	Opponent	Record	Points	Recap
10	November 1, 2003	4–3	Colorado Avalanche (2003–04)	5–3–2–0	12	W
11	November 5, 2003	3–2 OT	San Jose Sharks (2003–04)	6–3–2–0	14	W
12	November 7, 2003	1–1 OT	Toronto Maple Leafs (2003–04)	6–3–3–0	15	T
13	November 8, 2003	1–0	@ Ottawa Senators (2003–04)	7–3–3–0	17	W
14	November 12, 2003	2–2 OT	@ Buffalo Sabres (2003–04)	7–3–4–0	18	T
15	November 13, 2003	3–1	Florida Panthers (2003–04)	8–3–4–0	20	W
16	November 15, 2003	5–0	New York Rangers (2003–04)	9–3–4–0	22	W
17	November 19, 2003	4–1	Buffalo Sabres (2003–04)	10–3–4–0	24	W
18	November 21, 2003	2–1 OT	Pittsburgh Penguins (2003–04)	11–3–4–0	26	W
19	November 25, 2003	4–0	@ Los Angeles Kings (2003–04)	12–3–4–0	28	W
20	November 26, 2003	3–3 OT	@ Mighty Ducks of Anaheim (2003–04)	12–3–5–0	29	T
21	November 28, 2003	0–2	@ Dallas Stars (2003–04)	12–4–5–0	29	L
22	November 30, 2003	1–1 OT	@ Colorado Avalanche (2003–04)	12–4–6–0	30	T

December: 7–3–2–1 (home: 2–1–1–1; road: 5–2–1–0)

Game	Date	Score	Opponent	Record	Points	Recap
23	December 2, 2003	1–3	Phoenix Coyotes (2003–04)	12–5–6–0	30	L
24	December 4, 2003	3–0	Washington Capitals (2003–04)	13–5–6–0	31	W
25	December 6, 2003	2–1	@ Ottawa Senators (2003–04)	14–5–6–0	33	W
26	December 10, 2003	1–0 OT	New York Islanders (2003–04)	15–5–6–0	35	W
27	December 12, 2003	3–3 OT	Philadelphia Flyers (2003–04)	15–5–7–0	36	T
28	December 13, 2003	2–0	@ Philadelphia Flyers (2003–04)	16–5–7–0	38	W
29	December 16, 2003	4–5	@ New York Islanders (2003–04)	16–6–7–0	38	L
30	December 18, 2003	3–0	@ Atlanta Thrashers (2003–04)	17–6–7–0	40	W
31	December 19, 2003	5–2	@ Buffalo Sabres (2003–04)	18–6–7–0	42	W
32	December 21, 2003	2–2 OT	@ Chicago Blackhawks (2003–04)	18–6–8–0	43	T
33	December 26, 2003	3–4 OT	New York Islanders (2003–04)	18–6–8–1	44	OTL
34	December 27, 2003	2–0	@ Pittsburgh Penguins (2003–04)	19–6–8–1	46	W
35	December 29, 2003	1–3	@ New York Islanders (2003–04)	19–7–8–1	46	L

January: 8–6–2–0 (home: 4–4–0–0; road: 4–2–2–0)

Game	Date	Score	Opponent	Record	Points	Recap
36	January 1, 2004	2–2 OT	@ Washington Capitals (2003–04)	19–7–9–1	47	T
37	January 3, 2004	2–3	@ Nashville Predators (2003–04)	19–8–9–1	47	L
38	January 5, 2004	3–2 OT	Edmonton Oilers (2003–04)	20–8–9–1	49	W
39	January 7, 2004	2–4	Pittsburgh Penguins (2003–04)	20–9–9–1	49	L
40	January 9, 2004	1–4	Tampa Bay Lightning (2003–04)	20–10–9–1	49	L
41	January 10, 2004	1–0	@ Toronto Maple Leafs (2003–04)	21–10–9–1	51	W
42	January 13, 2004	0–4	Ottawa Senators (2003–04)	21–11–9–1	51	L
43	January 15, 2004	3–3 OT	@ New York Rangers (2003–04)	21–11–10–1	52	T
44	January 17, 2004	2–1 OT	Washington Capitals (2003–04)	22–11–10–1	54	W
45	January 20, 2004	3–0	@ Pittsburgh Penguins (2003–04)	23–11–10–1	56	W
46	January 21, 2004	1–2	Carolina Hurricanes (2003–04)	23–12–10–1	56	L
47	January 23, 2004	2–0	Montreal Canadiens (2003–04)	24–12–10–1	58	W
48	January 25, 2004	3–2	Atlanta Thrashers (2003–04)	25–12–10–1	61	W
49	January 27, 2004	4–3	@ Columbus Blue Jackets (2003–04)	26–12–10–1	63	W
50	January 29, 2004	2–5	@ Detroit Red Wings (2003–04)	26–13–10–1	63	L
51	January 31, 2004	4–1	@ St. Louis Blues (2003–04)	27–13–10–1	65	W

February: 6–6–1–0 (home: 5–3–1–0; road: 1–3–0–0)

Game	Date	Score	Opponent	Record	Points	Recap
52	February 3, 2004	2–1	Ottawa Senators (2003–04)	28–13–10–1	67	W
53	February 5, 2004	0–4	Vancouver Canucks (2003–04)	28–14–10–1	67	L
54	February 10, 2004	1–4	@ Philadelphia Flyers (2003–04)	28–15–10–1	67	L
55	February 11, 2004	1–3	New York Rangers (2003–04)	28–16–10–1	67	L
56	February 14, 2004	4–1	Carolina Hurricanes (2003–04)	29–16–10–1	69	W
57	February 15, 2004	3–2 OT	Los Angeles Kings (2003–04)	30–16–10–1	71	W
58	February 17, 2004	4–4 OT	Minnesota Wild (2003–04)	30–16–11–1	72	T
59	February 19, 2004	1–3	@ Washington Capitals (2003–04)	30–17–11–1	72	L
60	February 21, 2004	7–3	@ New York Rangers (2003–04)	31–17–11–1	74	W
61	February 22, 2004	3–1	Calgary Flames (2003–04)	32–17–11–1	76	W
62	February 25, 2004	8–2	Buffalo Sabres (2003–04)	33–17–11–1	78	W
63	February 27, 2004	2–3	Atlanta Thrashers (2003–04)	33–18–11–1	78	L
64	February 28, 2004	0–3	@ Toronto Maple Leafs (2003–04)	33–19–11–1	78	L

March: 9–5–1–1 (home: 4–1–1–0; road: 5–4–0–1)

Game	Date	Score	Opponent	Record	Points	Recap
65	March 1, 2004	1–2	@ Montreal Canadiens (2003–04)	33–20–11–1	78	L
66	March 3, 2004	5–2	@ Florida Panthers (2003–04)	34–20–11–1	80	W
67	March 5, 2004	2–3 OT	@ Tampa Bay Lightning (2003–04)	34–20–11–2	81	OTL
68	March 6, 2004	4–1	@ Carolina Hurricanes (2003–04)	35–20–11–2	83	W
69	March 9, 2004	1–3	Philadelphia Flyers (2003–04)	35–21–11–2	83	L
70	March 11, 2004	6–4	Chicago Blackhawks (2003–04)	36–21–11–2	85	W
71	March 13, 2004	1–2	@ Philadelphia Flyers (2003–04)	36–22–11–2	85	L
72	March 15, 2004	3–1	@ New York Rangers (2003–04)	37–22–11–2	87	W
73	March 17, 2004	6–1	Pittsburgh Penguins (2003–04)	38–22–11–2	89	W
74	March 19, 2004	1–1 OT	Montreal Canadiens (2003–04)	38–22–12–2	90	T
75	March 20, 2004	2–3	@ Montreal Canadiens (2003–04)	38–23–12–2	90	L
76	March 23, 2004	4–3 OT	@ Florida Panthers (2003–04)	39–23–12–2	92	W
77	March 25, 2004	1–2	@ Tampa Bay Lightning (2003–04)	39–24–12–2	92	L
78	March 26, 2004	5–0	@ Atlanta Thrashers (2003–04)	40–24–12–2	94	W
79	March 28, 2004	3–2	New York Islanders (2003–04)	41–24–12–2	96	W
80	March 30, 2004	5–0	New York Rangers (2003–04)	42–24–12–2	98	W

April: 1–1–0–0 (home: 0–1–0–0; road: 1–0–0–0)

Game	Date	Score	Opponent	Record	Points	Recap
81	April 3, 2004	5–2	@ Boston Bruins (2003–04)	43–24–12–2	100	W
82	April 4, 2004	1–3	Boston Bruins (2003–04)	43–25–12–2	100	L

Legend: W Win (2 points) L Loss (0 points) T Tie (1 point) OTL Overtime loss (1 point)

=== Playoffs ===
2004 Stanley Cup playoffs
Eastern Conference Quarterfinals vs. (3) Philadelphia Flyers – Flyers win 4–1

Game	Date	Score	Opponent	Attendance	Series	Recap
1	April 8, 2004	2–3	@ Philadelphia Flyers	19,608	Flyers lead 1–0	L
2	April 10, 2004	2–3	@ Philadelphia Flyers	19,779	Flyers lead 2–0	L
3	April 12, 2004	4–2	Philadelphia Flyers	18,023	Flyers lead 2–1	W
4	April 14, 2004	0–3	Philadelphia Flyers	19,040	Flyers lead 3–1	L
5	April 17, 2004	1–3	@ Philadelphia Flyers	19,778	Flyers win 4–1	L

Legend: W Win L Loss

== Player statistics ==
=== Scoring ===
- Position abbreviations: C = Center; D = Defense; G = Goaltender; LW = Left wing; RW = Right wing
- † = Joined team via a transaction (e.g., trade, waivers, signing) during the season. Stats reflect time with the Devils only.
- ‡ = Left team via a transaction (e.g., trade, waivers, release) during the season. Stats reflect time with the Devils only.

No.	Player	Pos	Regular season						Playoffs					
No.	Player	Pos	GP	G	A	Pts	+/-	PIM	GP	G	A	Pts	+/-	PIM
26	Patrik Elias	LW	82	38	43	81	26	44	5	3	2	5	−3	2
23	Scott Gomez	C	80	14	56	70	18	70	5	0	6	6	−2	0
27	Scott Niedermayer	D	81	14	40	54	20	44	5	1	0	1	−5	6
12	Jeff Friesen	LW	81	17	20	37	8	26	5	0	0	0	−2	4
28	Brian Rafalski	D	69	6	30	36	6	24	5	0	1	1	0	0
11	John Madden	C	80	12	23	35	7	22	5	0	0	0	0	0
18	Sergei Brylin	LW	82	14	19	33	10	20	5	0	0	0	0	0
14	Brian Gionta	RW	75	21	8	29	19	36	5	2	3	5	−2	0
24	Turner Stevenson	RW	61	14	13	27	0	76	5	0	0	0	−2	0
20	Jay Pandolfo	LW	82	13	13	26	5	14	5	0	0	0	0	0
15	Jamie Langenbrunner	RW	53	10	16	26	9	43	5	0	2	2	0	2
7	Paul Martin	D	70	6	18	24	12	4	5	1	1	2	−4	4
29	Grant Marshall	RW	65	8	7	15	−9	67	—	—	—	—	—	—
10	Erik Rasmussen	LW	69	7	6	13	5	41	5	0	2	2	1	2
5	Colin White	D	75	2	11	13	10	96	5	0	0	0	−1	4
4	Scott Stevens	D	38	3	9	12	3	22	—	—	—	—	—	—
16	Mike Rupp‡	C	51	6	5	11	−1	41	—	—	—	—	—	—
8	Igor Larionov	C	49	1	10	11	3	20	1	0	0	0	−1	0
16	Jan Hrdina†	C	13	1	6	7	4	10	5	2	0	2	0	2
22	Viktor Kozlov†	C	11	2	4	6	0	2	2	0	0	0	−1	0
17	Christian Berglund‡	LW	23	2	3	5	−4	4	—	—	—	—	—	—
6	Tommy Albelin	D	45	1	3	4	7	4	4	0	1	1	1	0
25	David Hale	D	65	0	4	4	12	72	1	0	0	0	1	0
2	Sean Brown	D	39	0	3	3	5	44	1	0	0	0	−1	2
19	Raymond Giroux	D	11	0	3	3	−3	4	4	0	0	0	1	0
32	Rob Skrlac	LW	8	1	0	1	1	22	—	—	—	—	—	—
9	Jiri Bicek	RW	12	0	1	1	0	0	2	0	0	0	−1	0
35	Corey Schwab	G	3	0	1	1		2	—	—	—	—	—	—
30	Martin Brodeur	G	75	0	0	0		4	5	0	0	0		0
40	Scott Clemmensen	G	4	0	0	0		0	—	—	—	—	—	—
22	Craig Darby	C	2	0	0	0	−1	0	—	—	—	—	—	—
19	Tuomas Pihlman	LW	2	0	0	0	0	2	—	—	—	—	—	—
21	Alexander Suglobov	RW	1	0	0	0	0	0	—	—	—	—	—	—

=== Goaltending ===
No.	Player	Regular season										Playoffs								
No.	Player	GP	W	L	T	SA	GA	GAA	SV%	SO	TOI	GP	W	L	SA	GA	GAA	SV%	SO	TOI
30	Martin Brodeur	75	38	26	11	1845	154	2.03	.917	11	4555	5	1	4	133	13	2.62	.902	0	298
40	Scott Clemmensen	4	3	1	0	84	4	1.01	.952	2	238	—	—	—	—	—	—	—	—	—
35	Corey Schwab	3	2	0	1	68	2	0.64	.971	1	187	—	—	—	—	—	—	—	—	—

== Awards and records ==
=== Awards ===
Martin Brodeur was also a finalist for the Hart Memorial Trophy and John Madden was a runner-up for the Frank J. Selke Trophy.

Type	Award/honor	Recipient	Ref
League (annual)	James Norris Memorial Trophy	Scott Niedermayer	
League (annual)	Lester Patrick Trophy	Mike Emrick	
League (annual)	NHL First All-Star Team	Martin Brodeur (Goaltender)	
League (annual)	NHL First All-Star Team	Scott Niedermayer (Defense)	
League (annual)	Vezina Trophy	Martin Brodeur	
League (annual)	William M. Jennings Trophy	Martin Brodeur	
League (in-season)	NHL All-Star Game selection	Martin Brodeur (Note: Brodeur, Niedermayer, and Stevens were voted to the starting lineup. Stevens was unable to play and was replaced by Rafalski, who also took his place in the starting lineup.)	
League (in-season)	NHL All-Star Game selection	Scott Niedermayer	
League (in-season)	NHL All-Star Game selection	Brian Rafalski	
League (in-season)	NHL All-Star Game selection	Scott Stevens	
League (in-season)	NHL Defensive Player of the Month	Martin Brodeur (November)	
League (in-season)	NHL Defensive Player of the Week	Martin Brodeur (December 15)	
League (in-season)	NHL Offensive Player of the Month	Scott Gomez (March)	
League (in-season)	NHL Offensive Player of the Week	Patrik Elias (March 29)	
League (in-season)	NHL YoungStars Game selection	Paul Martin	
Team	Devils' Players' Player	Turner Stevenson	
Team	Hugh Delano Unsung Hero	Brian Gionta	
Team	Most Valuable Devil	Scott Niedermayer	
Team	Three-Star Award	Patrik Elias	

=== Milestones ===
Milestone	Player	Date	Ref
First game	David Hale	October 8, 2003	
First game	Paul Martin	October 8, 2003	
First game	Rob Skrlac	December 13, 2003	
First game	Tuomas Pihlman	January 1, 2004	
First game	Alexander Suglobov	January 5, 2004	
500th coaching win	Pat Burns	March 30, 2004	

== Transactions ==
The Devils were involved in the following transactions from June 10, 2003, the day after the deciding game of the 2003 Stanley Cup Finals, through June 7, 2004, the day of the deciding game of the 2004 Stanley Cup Finals.

=== Trades ===
Date	Details		Ref
June 21, 2003	To Edmonton Oilers: 1st-round pick in 2003; 2nd-round pick in 2003	To New Jersey Devils: 1st-round pick in 2003	
June 21, 2003	To St. Louis Blues: Mike Danton; 3rd-round pick in 2003	To New Jersey Devils: 3rd-round pick in 2003	
March 1, 2003	To Florida Panthers: Christian Berglund; Victor Uchevatov	To New Jersey Devils: Viktor Kozlov	
March 5, 2003	To Phoenix Coyotes: Mike Rupp; 2nd-round pick in 2004	To New Jersey Devils: Jan Hrdina	

=== Players acquired ===
Date	Player	Former team	Term	Via	Ref
July 24, 2003	Sean Brown	Boston Bruins		Free agency	
July 25, 2003	Erik Rasmussen	Los Angeles Kings		Free agency	
July 30, 2003	Ryan Murphy	Carolina Hurricanes		Free agency	
September 9, 2003	Greg Crozier	Minnesota Wild		Free agency	
September 10, 2003	Igor Larionov	Detroit Red Wings		Free agency	

=== Players lost ===
Date	Player	New team	Via (Note: In parentheses is the player's free agency group on July 1 if applicable.)	Ref
July 11, 2003	Max Birbraer	Florida Panthers	Free agency	
July 11, 2003	Ken Daneyko		Retirement (III)	
July 22, 2003	Jim McKenzie	Nashville Predators	Free agency (III)	
August 23, 2003	Oleg Tverdovsky	Avangard Omsk (RSL)	Free agency (UFA)	
September 9, 2003	Joe Nieuwendyk	Toronto Maple Leafs	Free agency (III)	
September 17, 2003	Richard Smehlik		Retirement (III)	
N/A	Daryl Andrews	San Antonio Rampage (AHL)	Free agency (VI)	
October 3, 2003	Dave Roche	Toronto Roadrunners (AHL)	Free agency (UFA)	
October 5, 2003	Jason Lehoux	Manitoba Moose (AHL)	Free agency (UFA)	
October 22, 2003	Pascal Rheaume	New York Rangers	Free agency (V)	
April 19, 2004	Igor Larionov		Retirement	
April 22, 2004	Steve Guolla	Kloten Flyers (NLA)	Free agency	

=== Signings ===
Date	Player	Term	Contract type	Ref
July 15, 2003	Matt DeMarchi		Entry-level	
July 15, 2003	Ahren Nittel		Entry-level	
July 15, 2003	Tuomas Pihlman		Entry-level	
July 15, 2003	Ilkka Pikkarainen		Entry-level	
July 15, 2003	Aleksander Suglobov		Entry-level	
July 15, 2003	Colin White	multi-year	Re-signing	
August 8, 2003	Paul Martin		Entry-level	
August 9, 2003	Jeff Friesen	1-year	Re-signing	
October 15, 2003	Tommy Albelin		Re-signing	
March 24, 2004	Aaron Voros		Entry-level	
March 29, 2004	Zach Parise		Entry-level	
May 21, 2004	Petr Vrana		Entry-level	

== Draft picks ==
The Devils' draft picks at the 2003 NHL entry draft at the Gaylord Entertainment Center in Nashville, Tennessee.

Rd #	Pick #	Player	Nat	Pos	Team (League)	Notes
1	17	Zach Parise	United States	C	University of North Dakota (WCHA)	(Note: The Devils acquired the 2003 first-round pick from Edmonton for St. Louis' 2003 first-round pick (used on Marc-Antoine Pouliot) and the Devils' 2003 second-round pick (used on Jean-François Jacques) on June 21, 2003. The Devils had traded their original 2003 first-round draft pick (used on Shawn Belle) to St. Louis for the Blues' first-round pick.)
2	42	Petr Vrana	Czech Republic	C	Halifax Mooseheads (QMJHL)	
3	93	Ivan Khomutov	Russia	C	Elektrostal Elemash (Vysshaya Liga)	(Note: The Devils acquired the 2003 third-round pick from St. Louis for Mike Danton and the Devils' 2003 third-round pick (used on Konstantin Zakharov) on June 21, 2003.)
4	136	No fourth-round pick				(Note: The Devils traded their 2003 fourth-round pick (used on Michael Vanelli) to Atlanta for Richard Smehlik and a conditional 2004 draft pick on March 10, 2003.)
5	167	Zach Tarkir	United States	D	Chilliwack Chiefs (BCHL)	
6	197	Jason Smith	Canada	G	Lennoxville Cougars (LHJAAAQ)	
7	229	No seventh-round pick				(Note: The Devils traded the 2003 seventh-round pick (used on Stephen Dixon) to Pittsburgh for Stephane Richer on March 19, 2002.)
8	261	Joey Tenute	Canada	C	Sarnia Sting (OHL)	
9	292	Arseny Bondarev	Russia	LW	Yaroslavl Jrs. (Russia)	

== Media ==
Television coverage was still on Fox Sports Net New York with commentators Mike Emrick and Chico Resch as usual with Matt Loughlin hosting in the studio. Radio coverage remained on WABC 770 with John Hennessy calling the play-by-play with Randy Velischek providing color commentary.

== See also ==
- 2003–04 NHL season
