= 2003–04 Montreal Canadiens season =

NHL hockey team season

2003–04 Montreal Canadiens
- Division: 4th Northeast
- Conference: 7th Eastern
- 2003–04 record: 41–30–7–4
- Home record: 23–13–4–1
- Road record: 18–17–3–3
- Goals for: 208
- Goals against: 192

Team information
- General manager: Bob Gainey
- Coach: Claude Julien
- Captain: Saku Koivu
- Alternate captains: Craig Rivet; Sheldon Souray
- Arena: Bell Centre
- Average attendance: 20,555 (96.6%)
- Minor league affiliates: Hamilton Bulldogs; Long Beach Ice Dogs

Team leaders
- Goals: Richard Zednik (26)
- Assists: Mike Ribeiro (45)
- Points: Mike Ribeiro (65)
- Penalty minutes: Darren Langdon (135)
- Plus/minus: Patrice Brisebois (+17)
- Wins: Jose Theodore (33)
- Goals against average: Jose Theodore; Mathieu Garon (2.27)

The 2003–04 Montreal Canadiens season was the club's 95th season of play and their 87th in the National Hockey League (NHL). The Canadiens would return to the playoffs reaching the Eastern Conference Semifinals before being eliminated by the eventual Stanley Cup champions, the Tampa Bay Lightning, 4–0.

== Offseason ==
Bob Gainey, who played his entire 16 season NHL career with Montreal, was named the team’s new general manager on June 2, 2003, and assumed the role on July 1 from Andre Savard, who was demoted to assistant general manager.

== Regular season ==
=== Heritage Classic ===
The Heritage Classic was an outdoor ice hockey game played on November 22, 2003, in Edmonton, Alberta, between the Edmonton Oilers and the Montreal Canadiens. It was the second NHL outdoor game and the first regular season outdoor game in the history of the NHL, and was modeled after the success of the "cold war" game between the University of Michigan and Michigan State University in 2001.

The first NHL game to be played outdoors was in 1991 when the Los Angeles Kings played the New York Rangers in an exhibition game outside Caesars Palace in Las Vegas. The event took place in Edmonton's Commonwealth Stadium in front of a crowd of 57,167, the largest number of people to ever watch a live NHL game, despite temperatures of close to −18 °C, −30 °C (−22 °F) with wind chill. It was held to commemorate the 25th anniversary of the Edmonton Oilers joining the NHL in 1979.

The Canadian Broadcasting Corporation (CBC) television broadcast also set the record for most viewers of a single NHL game with 2.747 million nationwide. This was the first NHL game broadcast in HDTV on CBC.

The Canadiens won the game by a score of 4–3.

=== Final standings ===
Northeast Division
No.	CR		GP	W	L	T	OTL	GF	GA	Pts
1	2	**Boston Bruins**	82	41	19	15	7	209	188	104
2	4	**Toronto Maple Leafs**	82	45	24	10	3	242	204	103
3	5	**Ottawa Senators**	82	43	23	10	6	262	189	102
4	7	**Montreal Canadiens**	82	41	30	7	4	208	192	93
5	9	Buffalo Sabres	82	37	34	7	4	220	221	85

Note: CR = Conference rank; GP = Games played; W = Wins; L = Losses; T = Ties; OTL = Overtime loss; GF = Goals for; GA = Goals against; Pts = Points
Bolded teams qualified for the playoffs.

Eastern Conference
R		Div	GP	W	L	T	OTL	GF	GA	Pts
**1**	**Z-** Tampa Bay Lightning	**SE**	**82**	**46**	**22**	**8**	**6**	**245**	**192**	106
**2**	**Y-** Boston Bruins	**NE**	**82**	**41**	**19**	**15**	**7**	**209**	**188**	104
**3**	**Y-** Philadelphia Flyers	**AT**	**82**	**40**	**21**	**15**	**6**	**209**	**188**	101
**4**	**X-** Toronto Maple Leafs	**NE**	**82**	**45**	**24**	**10**	**3**	**242**	**204**	103
**5**	**X-** Ottawa Senators	**NE**	**82**	**43**	**23**	**10**	**6**	**262**	**189**	102
**6**	**X-** New Jersey Devils	**AT**	**82**	**43**	**25**	**12**	**2**	**213**	**164**	100
**7**	**X-** Montreal Canadiens	**NE**	**82**	**41**	**30**	**7**	**4**	**208**	**192**	93
**8**	**X-** New York Islanders	**AT**	**82**	**38**	**29**	**11**	**4**	**237**	**210**	91
8.5
9	Buffalo Sabres	NE	82	37	34	7	4	220	221	85
10	Atlanta Thrashers	SE	82	33	37	8	4	214	243	78
11	Carolina Hurricanes	SE	82	28	34	14	6	172	209	76
12	Florida Panthers	SE	82	28	35	15	4	188	221	75
13	New York Rangers	AT	82	27	40	7	8	206	250	69
14	Washington Capitals	SE	82	23	46	10	3	186	253	59
15	Pittsburgh Penguins	AT	82	23	47	8	4	190	303	58

Divisions: AT – Atlantic, NE – Northeast, SE – Southeast

Z – Clinched conference; Y – Clinched division; X – Clinched playoff spot

== Schedule and results ==
=== Regular season ===
2003–04 regular season
October: 6–5–0–0 (home: 4–3–0–0; road: 2–2–0–0)

Game	Date	Score	Opponent	Record	Points	Recap
1	October 9, 2003	2–5	@ Ottawa Senators (2003–04)	0–1–0–0	0	L
2	October 11, 2003	4–0	@ Toronto Maple Leafs (2003–04)	1–1–0–0	2	W
3	October 14, 2003	5–1	Washington Capitals (2003–04)	2–1–0–0	4	W
4	October 16, 2003	4–1	Pittsburgh Penguins (2003–04)	3–1–0–0	6	W
5	October 18, 2003	0–1	Toronto Maple Leafs (2003–04)	3–2–0–0	6	L
6	October 20, 2003	2–1	Detroit Red Wings (2003–04)	4–2–0–0	8	W
7	October 23, 2003	3–0	New York Islanders (2003–04)	5–2–0–0	10	W
8	October 25, 2003	2–6	Ottawa Senators (2003–04)	5–3–0–0	10	L
9	October 27, 2003	0–5	@ Philadelphia Flyers (2003–04)	5–4–0–0	10	L
10	October 28, 2003	0–2	Boston Bruins (2003–04)	5–5–0–0	10	L
11	October 30, 2003	1–0 OT	@ Boston Bruins (2003–04)	6–5–0–0	12	W

November: 4–6–2–1 (home: 1–3–2–0; road: 3–3–0–1)

Game	Date	Score	Opponent	Record	Points	Recap
12	November 1, 2003	1–5	New York Rangers (2003–04)	6–6–0–0	12	L
13	November 4, 2003	2–4	Edmonton Oilers (2003–04)	6–7–0–0	12	L
14	November 7, 2003	1–2	@ Buffalo Sabres (2003–04)	6–8–0–0	12	L
15	November 8, 2003	3–0	Buffalo Sabres (2003–04)	7–8–0–0	14	W
16	November 11, 2003	1–1 OT	Columbus Blue Jackets (2003–04)	7–8–1–0	15	T
17	November 13, 2003	1–3	@ New York Islanders (2003–04)	7–9–1–0	15	L
18	November 15, 2003	3–2	@ Ottawa Senators (2003–04)	8–9–1–0	17	W
19	November 18, 2003	4–5 OT	@ Vancouver Canucks (2003–04)	8–9–1–1	18	OTL
20	November 20, 2003	1–2	@ Calgary Flames (2003–04)	8–10–1–1	18	L
21	November 22, 2003	4–3	@ Edmonton Oilers (2003–04)	9–10–1–1	20	W
22	November 25, 2003	2–5	Vancouver Canucks (2003–04)	9–11–1–1	20	L
23	November 28, 2003	5–3	@ Washington Capitals (2003–04)	10–11–1–1	22	W
24	November 29, 2003	1–1 OT	Florida Panthers (2003–04)	10–11–2–1	23	T

December: 7–4–3–1 (home: 4–1–1–0; road: 3–3–2–1)

Game	Date	Score	Opponent	Record	Points	Recap
25	December 2, 2003	3–2	Tampa Bay Lightning (2003–04)	11–11–2–1	25	W
26	December 5, 2003	1–1 OT	@ Carolina Hurricanes (2003–04)	11–11–3–1	26	T
27	December 6, 2003	3–1	Carolina Hurricanes (2003–04)	12–11–3–1	28	W
28	December 8, 2003	2–3	Philadelphia Flyers (2003–04)	12–12–3–1	28	L
29	December 10, 2003	2–1	@ New York Rangers (2003–04)	13–12–3–1	30	W
30	December 12, 2003	2–4	@ Florida Panthers (2003–04)	13–13–3–1	30	L
31	December 13, 2003	5–2	@ Tampa Bay Lightning (2003–04)	14–13–3–1	32	W
32	December 16, 2003	1–1 OT	Boston Bruins (2003–04)	14–13–4–1	33	T
33	December 18, 2003	5–4 OT	Nashville Predators (2003–04)	15–13–4–1	35	W
34	December 20, 2003	2–4	@ Toronto Maple Leafs (2003–04)	15–14–4–1	35	L
35	December 22, 2003	4–1	Pittsburgh Penguins (2003–04)	16–14–4–1	37	W
36	December 23, 2003	2–3	@ Washington Capitals (2003–04)	16–15–4–1	37	L
37	December 27, 2003	1–2 OT	@ Carolina Hurricanes (2003–04)	16–15–4–2	38	OTL
38	December 29, 2003	2–1	@ Atlanta Thrashers (2003–04)	17–15–4–2	40	W
39	December 31, 2003	1–1 OT	@ Dallas Stars (2003–04)	17–15–5–2	41	T

January: 8–5–1–0 (home: 4–3–1–0; road: 4–2–0–0)

Game	Date	Score	Opponent	Record	Points	Recap
40	January 3, 2004	5–1	Atlanta Thrashers (2003–04)	18–15–5–2	43	W
41	January 4, 2004	4–1	Washington Capitals (2003–04)	19–15–5–2	45	W
42	January 6, 2004	3–1	Buffalo Sabres (2003–04)	20–15–5–2	47	W
43	January 8, 2004	1–4	Tampa Bay Lightning (2003–04)	20–16–5–2	47	L
44	January 10, 2004	8–0	@ Pittsburgh Penguins (2003–04)	21–16–5–2	49	W
45	January 13, 2004	5–2	St. Louis Blues (2003–04)	22–16–5–2	51	W
46	January 14, 2004	2–1	@ Atlanta Thrashers (2003–04)	23–16–5–2	53	W
47	January 17, 2004	2–2 OT	New York Rangers (2003–04)	23–16–6–2	54	T
48	January 20, 2004	4–1	@ Philadelphia Flyers (2003–04)	24–16–6–2	56	W
49	January 23, 2004	0–2	@ New Jersey Devils (2003–04)	24–17–6–2	56	L
50	January 24, 2004	1–4	Toronto Maple Leafs (2003–04)	24–18–6–2	56	L
51	January 27, 2004	1–4	@ Buffalo Sabres (2003–04)	24–19–6–2	56	L
52	January 29, 2004	3–2 OT	@ Minnesota Wild (2003–04)	25–19–6–2	58	W
53	January 31, 2004	0–1	Boston Bruins (2003–04)	25–20–6–2	58	L

February: 8–5–0–0 (home: 5–1–0–0; road: 3–4–0–0)

Game	Date	Score	Opponent	Record	Points	Recap
54	February 1, 2004	6–4	Chicago Blackhawks (2003–04)	26–20–6–2	60	W
55	February 3, 2004	4–3	@ Pittsburgh Penguins (2003–04)	27–20–6–2	62	W
56	February 5, 2004	2–1	New York Islanders (2003–04)	28–20–6–2	64	W
57	February 10, 2004	1–2	@ Florida Panthers (2003–04)	28–21–6–2	64	L
58	February 12, 2004	3–5	@ Tampa Bay Lightning (2003–04)	28–22–6–2	64	L
59	February 14, 2004	2–5	@ Ottawa Senators (2003–04)	28–23–6–2	64	L
60	February 17, 2004	1–4	Atlanta Thrashers (2003–04)	28–24–6–2	64	L
61	February 19, 2004	4–1	Calgary Flames (2003–04)	29–24–6–2	66	W
62	February 21, 2004	4–5	@ Toronto Maple Leafs (2003–04)	29–25–6–2	66	L
63	February 23, 2004	4–1	@ New York Rangers (2003–04)	30–25–6–2	68	W
64	February 24, 2004	4–2	Ottawa Senators (2003–04)	31–25–6–2	70	W
65	February 26, 2004	3–2 OT	@ Boston Bruins (2003–04)	32–25–6–2	72	W
66	February 28, 2004	1–0 OT	Carolina Hurricanes (2003–04)	33–25–6–2	74	W

March: 7–4–1–2 (home: 4–1–0–1; road: 3–3–1–1)

Game	Date	Score	Opponent	Record	Points	Recap
67	March 1, 2004	2–1	New Jersey Devils (2003–04)	34–25–6–2	76	W
68	March 3, 2004	3–4	@ San Jose Sharks (2003–04)	34–26–6–2	76	L
69	March 5, 2004	4–3	@ Phoenix Coyotes (2003–04)	35–26–6–2	78	W
70	March 6, 2004	4–2	@ Los Angeles Kings (2003–04)	36–26–6–2	80	W
71	March 8, 2004	5–2	@ Mighty Ducks of Anaheim (2003–04)	37–26–6–2	82	W
72	March 11, 2004	2–3 OT	Florida Panthers (2003–04)	37–26–6–3	83	OTL
73	March 13, 2004	4–3	Toronto Maple Leafs (2003–04)	38–26–6–3	85	W
74	March 16, 2004	4–2	Colorado Avalanche (2003–04)	39–26–6–3	87	W
75	March 19, 2004	1–1 OT	@ New Jersey Devils (2003–04)	39–26–7–3	88	T
76	March 20, 2004	3–2	New Jersey Devils (2003–04)	40–26–7–3	90	W
77	March 24, 2004	1–2	@ Buffalo Sabres (2003–04)	40–27–7–3	90	L
78	March 25, 2004	0–4	Ottawa Senators (2003–04)	40–28–7–3	90	L
79	March 27, 2004	2–3 OT	@ Boston Bruins (2003–04)	40–28–7–4	91	OTL
80	March 31, 2004	1–5	@ New York Islanders (2003–04)	40–29–7–4	91	L

April: 1–1–0–0 (home: 1–1–0–0; road: 0–0–0–0)

Game	Date	Score	Opponent	Record	Points	Recap
81	April 1, 2004	0–2	Philadelphia Flyers (2003–04)	40–30–7–4	91	L
82	April 3, 2004	6–3	Buffalo Sabres (2003–04)	41–30–7–4	93	W

Legend: W Win (2 points) L Loss (0 points) T Tie (1 point) OTL Overtime loss (1 point)

== Playoffs ==
2004 Stanley Cup playoffs
Eastern Conference Quarterfinals vs. (2) Boston Bruins – Canadiens win 4–3

Game	Date	Visitor	Score	Home	OT	Decision	Attendance	Series	Recap
1	April 7	Montreal	3–0	Boston		Raycroft	17,565	Boston leads 1–0	L
2	April 9	Montreal	2–1	Boston	OT	Raycroft	17,565	Boston leads 2–0	L
3	April 11	Boston	2–3	Montreal		Theodore	21,273	Boston leads 2–1	W
4	April 13	Boston	3–4	Montreal	OT	Raycroft	21,273	Boston leads 3–1	L
5	April 15	Montreal	5–1	Boston		Theodore	17,565	Boston leads 3–2	W
6	April 17	Boston	2–5	Montreal		Theodore	21,273	Series tied 3–3	W
7	April 19	Montreal	2–0	Boston		Theodore	17,565	Montreal wins 4–3	W

Eastern Conference Semifinals vs. (1) Tampa Bay Lightning – Tampa Bay wins series 4–0

Game	Date	Visitor	Score	Home	OT	Decision	Attendance	Series	Recap
1	April 23	Montreal	0–4	Tampa Bay		Theodore	18,904	Tampa Bay leads 1–0	L
2	April 25	Montreal	1–3	Tampa Bay		Theodore	19,435	Tampa Bay leads 2–0	L
3	April 27	Tampa Bay	3–2	Montreal	OT	Theodore	21,273	Tampa Bay leads 3–0	L
4	April 29	Tampa Bay	3–1	Montreal		Theodore	21,273	Tampa Bay wins 4–0	L

Legend: W Win L Loss

== Player statistics ==
=== Scoring ===
- Position abbreviations: C = Centre; D = Defence; G = Goaltender; LW = Left wing; RW = Right wing
- † = Joined team via a transaction (e.g., trade, waivers, signing) during the season. Stats reflect time with the Canadiens only.
- ‡ = Left team via a transaction (e.g., trade, waivers, release) during the season. Stats reflect time with the Canadiens only.

No.	Player	Pos	Regular season						Playoffs					
No.	Player	Pos	GP	G	A	Pts	+/-	PIM	GP	G	A	Pts	+/-	PIM
71	Mike Ribeiro	C	81	20	45	65	15	34	11	2	1	3	0	18
73	Michael Ryder	RW	81	25	38	63	10	26	11	1	2	3	−5	4
11	Saku Koivu	C	68	14	41	55	−5	52	11	3	8	11	1	10
20	Richard Zednik	RW	81	26	24	50	5	63	11	3	3	6	7	2
44	Sheldon Souray	D	63	15	20	35	4	104	11	0	2	2	−2	39
94	Yanic Perreault	C	69	16	15	31	−10	40	9	2	2	4	−3	0
43	Patrice Brisebois	D	71	4	27	31	17	22	11	2	1	3	−5	4
38	Jan Bulis	C	72	13	17	30	−8	30	11	1	1	2	−6	4
79	Andrei Markov	D	69	6	22	28	−2	20	11	1	4	5	3	8
26	Pierre Dagenais	RW	50	17	10	27	15	24	8	0	1	1	−1	6
37	Niklas Sundstrom	RW	66	8	12	20	3	18	4	1	0	1	−1	2
51	Francis Bouillon	D	73	2	16	18	1	70	11	0	0	0	−6	7
22	Steve Begin	C	52	10	5	15	6	41	9	0	1	1	0	10
90	Joe Juneau	C	70	5	10	15	−4	20	11	0	1	1	−2	4
17	Jason Ward	RW	53	5	7	12	3	21	5	0	2	2	−2	2
24	Andreas Dackell	RW	60	4	8	12	8	10	—	—	—	—	—	—
52	Craig Rivet	D	80	4	8	12	−1	98	11	1	4	5	2	2
82	Donald Audette‡	RW	23	3	5	8	−4	16	—	—	—	—	—	—
5	Stephane Quintal	D	73	3	5	8	10	82	4	0	0	0	−1	2
34	Jim Dowd†	C	14	3	2	5	6	6	11	0	2	2	−3	2
25	Chad Kilger‡	LW	36	2	2	4	2	14	—	—	—	—	—	—
8	Mike Komisarek	D	46	0	4	4	4	34	7	0	0	0	1	8
27	Alexei Kovalev†	RW	12	1	2	3	−4	12	11	6	4	10	2	8
15	Darren Langdon	LW	64	0	3	3	−2	135	9	1	0	1	0	6
60	Jose Theodore	G	67	0	3	3		4	11	0	2	2		0
65	Ron Hainsey	D	11	1	1	2	3	4	—	—	—	—	—	—
81	Marcel Hossa	LW	15	1	1	2	−3	8	—	—	—	—	—	—
46	Benoit Gratton	C	4	0	1	1	0	4	—	—	—	—	—	—
76	Jozef Balej‡	RW	4	0	0	0	−1	0	—	—	—	—	—	—
32	Gordie Dwyer	LW	2	0	0	0	0	7	—	—	—	—	—	—
28	Karl Dykhuis	D	9	0	0	0	−2	2	—	—	—	—	—	—
30	Mathieu Garon	G	19	0	0	0		2	1	0	0	0		0
88	Chris Higgins	C	2	0	0	0	0	0	—	—	—	—	—	—
35	Tomas Plekanec	LW	2	0	0	0	0	0	—	—	—	—	—	—

=== Goaltending ===
No.	Player	Regular season										Playoffs								
No.	Player	GP	W	L	T	SA	GA	GAA	SV%	SO	TOI	GP	W	L	SA	GA	GAA	SV%	SO	TOI
60	Jose Theodore	67	33	28	5	1860	150	2.27	.919	6	3961	11	4	7	333	27	2.39	.919	1	678
30	Mathieu Garon	19	8	6	2	480	38	2.27	.921	0	1003	1	0	0	6	0	0.00	1.000	0	12

== Awards and records ==
=== Awards ===
Type	Award/honor	Recipient	Ref
League (annual)	NHL All-Rookie Team	Michael Ryder (Forward)	
League (in-season)	NHL All-Star Game selection	Sheldon Souray	
League (in-season)	NHL All-Star Game selection	Jose Theodore	
League (in-season)	NHL Defensive Player of the Week	Jose Theodore (March 1)	
League (in-season)	NHL Offensive Player of the Week	Richard Zednik (March 8)	
League (in-season)	NHL Rookie of the Month	Michael Ryder (February)	
League (in-season)	NHL YoungStars Game selection	Michael Ryder	
Team	Jacques Beauchamp Molson Trophy	Francis Bouillon	
Team	Molson Cup	Jose Theodore	

=== Milestones ===
Milestone	Player	Date	Ref
First game	Michael Ryder	October 9, 2003	
First game	Chris Higgins	October 11, 2003	
First game	Tomas Plekanec	December 31, 2003	
First game	Jozef Balej	January 23, 2004	
1,000th game played	Stephane Quintal	January 6, 2004	

== Transactions ==
The Canadiens were involved in the following transactions from June 10, 2003, the day after the deciding game of the 2003 Stanley Cup Finals, through June 7, 2004, the day of the deciding game of the 2004 Stanley Cup Finals.

=== Trades ===
Date	Details		Ref
June 22, 2003	To Washington Capitals: Nashville’s 4th-round pick in 2003	To Montreal Canadiens: 4th-round pick in 2003; 7th-round pick in 2003	
March 2, 2004	To New York Rangers: Jozef Balej; 2nd-round pick in 2004	To Montreal Canadiens: Alexei Kovalev	
March 4, 2004	To Minnesota Wild: 4th-round pick in 2004	To Montreal Canadiens: Jim Dowd	
March 9, 2004	To Vancouver Canucks: Sylvain Blouin	To Montreal Canadiens: Rene Vydareny	

=== Players acquired ===
Date	Player	Former team	Term	Via	Ref
July 4, 2003	Pierre Dagenais	Florida Panthers	1-year (Note: Club option for a second year)	Free agency	
July 4, 2003	Jean-Francois Damphousse	Calgary Flames	1-year	Free agency	
October 3, 2003	Steve Begin	Buffalo Sabres		Waiver draft	
October 3, 2003	Darren Langdon	Vancouver Canucks		Waiver draft	
March 19, 2004	Yann Danis	Brown University (ECAC)	3-year	Free agency	

=== Players lost ===
Date	Player	New team	Via (Note: In parentheses is the player's free agency group on July 1 if applicable.)	Ref
July 1, 2003	Mariusz Czerkawski	New York Islanders (Note: Czerkawski signed with New York on July 17.)	Buyout	
July 1, 2003	Randy McKay (Note: McKay announced his retirement on September 13, 2003.)		Buyout	
July 1, 2003	Matt O'Dette (Note: O'Dette was inactive during the 2003–04 season.)		Contract expiration (UFA)	
July 29, 2003	Matthieu Descoteaux	Tappara (Liiga)	Free agency (VI)	
August 25, 2003	Bill Lindsay	Atlanta Thrashers	Free agency (III)	
September 10, 2003	Gino Odjick		Retirement (III)	
January 2, 2004	Donald Audette	Florida Panthers (Note: Audette signed with Florida on January 16.)	Buyout	
March 9, 2004	Chad Kilger	Toronto Maple Leafs	Waivers	
May 1, 2004	Joe Juneau		Retirement	
May 14, 2004	Andreas Dackell	Brynas IF (SHL)	Free agency	

=== Signings ===
Date	Player	Term	Contract type	Ref
June 17, 2003	Francois Beauchemin	2-year	Re-signing	
June 17, 2003	Eric Fichaud	1-year	Option exercised	
July 1, 2003	Chad Kilger	2-year	Re-signing	
July 4, 2003	Jonathan Ferland	3-year	Entry-level	
July 11, 2003	Alexander Perezhogin	3-year	Entry-level	
July 22, 2003	Michael Ryder	1-year	Re-signing	
July 24, 2003	Mike Ribeiro	1-year	Re-signing	
August 4, 2003	Gordie Dwyer	2-year	Re-signing	
August 26, 2003	Andrei Markov	2-year	Re-signing	
September 4, 2003	Matt Shasby	2-year	Entry-level	
September 5, 2003	Saku Koivu	2-year	Re-signing	
June 1, 2004	Michael Lambert	3-year	Entry-level	

== Draft picks ==
Montreal's draft picks at the 2003 NHL entry draft held at the Gaylord Entertainment Center in Nashville, Tennessee.

Round	#	Player	Nationality	College/junior/club team
1	10	Andrei Kostitsyn (RW)	Belarus	CSKA Moscow (RSL)
2	40	Cory Urquhart (C)	Canada	Montreal Rocket (QMJHL)
2	61	Maxim Lapierre (C)	Canada	Montreal Rocket (QMJHL)
3	79	Ryan O'Byrne (D)	Canada	Calgary Hitmen (WHL)
4	113	Corey Locke (C)	Canada	Ottawa 67's (OHL)
4	123	Danny Stewart (LW)	Canada	Rimouski Océanic (QMJHL)
6	177	Christopher Heino-Lindberg (G)	Sweden	Hammarby IF (Sweden)
6	188	Mark Flood (D)	Canada	Peterborough Petes (OHL)
7	217	Oskari Korpikari (D)	Finland	Oulun Kärpät (Finland)
8	241	Jimmy Bonneau (LW)	Canada	Montreal Rocket (QMJHL)
9	271	Jaroslav Halak (G)	Slovakia	Slovan Bratislava Jr. (Slovakia)

== See also ==
- 2003–04 NHL season
