= Rob Skrlac =

Canadian ice hockey player

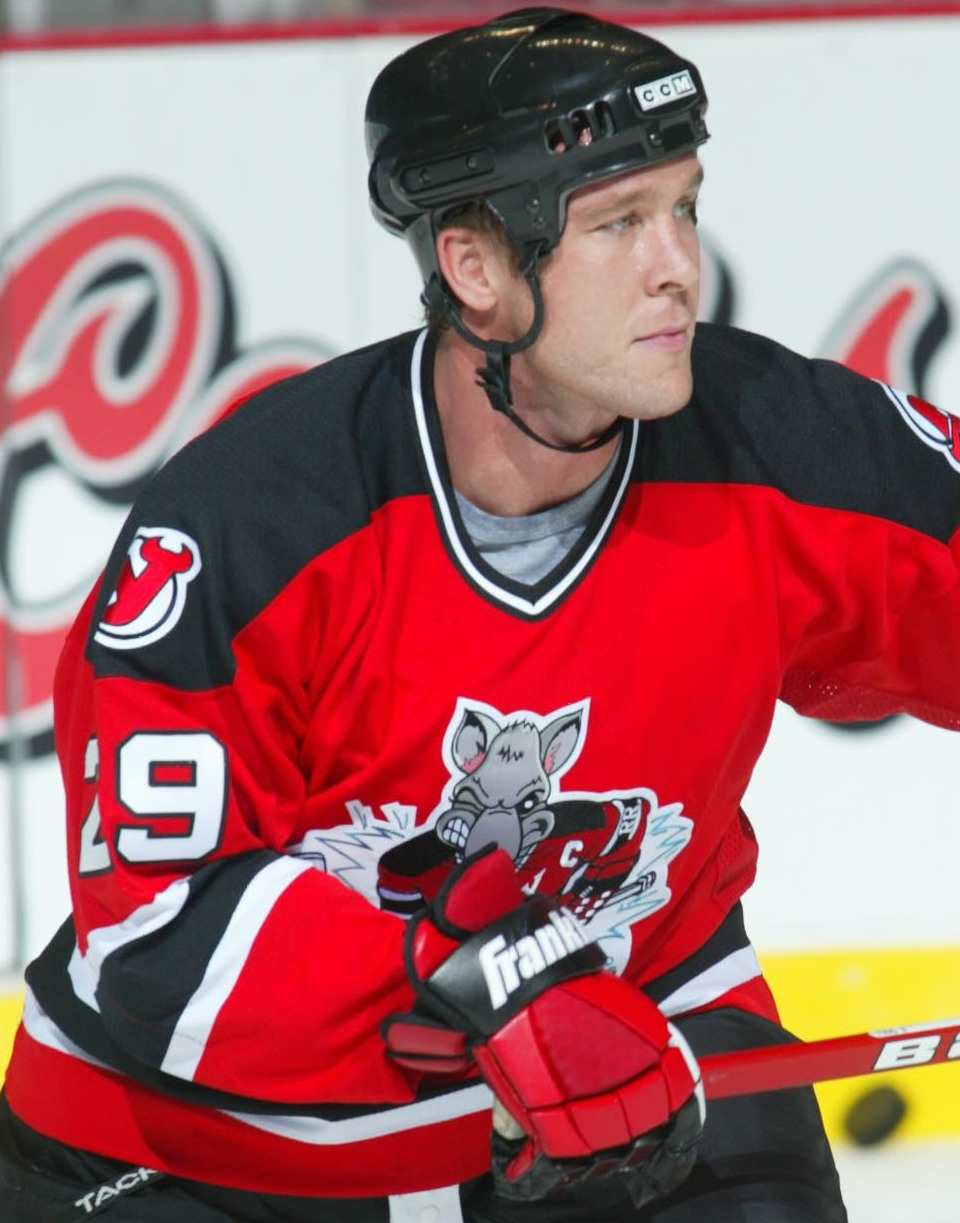
- Skrlac with the Albany River Rats during the 2004-05 season
- Born: June 10, 1976 (age 49) Port McNeill, British Columbia, Canada
- Height: 6 ft 5 in (196 cm)
- Weight: 245 lb (111 kg; 17 st 7 lb)
- Position: Left wing
- Shot: Left
- Played for: New Jersey Devils
- NHL draft: 224th overall, 1995; Buffalo Sabres
- Playing career: 1997–2005

Robert E. Skrlac (born June 10, 1976) is a Canadian former professional ice hockey right winger.

Skrlac was drafted by the Buffalo Sabres in the 9th round, 224th overall, of the 1995 NHL entry draft. However, he never played a game for Buffalo. On June 17, 1997 he signed as a free agent with the New Jersey Devils. Skrlac played 8 games for the Devils in 2003–04. He never played in the NHL again but continued to play in the minors until he announced his retirement on September 27, 2005. He is now a Premium Seating Sales Manager for New Jersey Devils.

== Career statistics ==
			Regular season					Playoffs
Season	Team	League	GP	G	A	Pts	PIM	GP	G	A	Pts	PIM
1993–94	Richmond Sockeyes	PIJHL	49	44	55	99	56	—	—	—	—	—
1993–94	Cranbrook Colts	RMJHL	44	3	6	9	271	—	—	—	—	—
1994–95	Cranbrook Colts	RMJHL	16	4	4	8	36	—	—	—	—	—
1994–95	Kamloops Blazers	WHL	23	0	1	1	177	—	—	—	—	—
1995–96	Kamloops Blazers	WHL	63	1	4	5	216	13	0	0	0	52
1996–97	Kamloops Blazers	WHL	61	8	10	18	278	5	0	0	0	35
1997–98	Albany River Rats	AHL	53	0	2	2	256	—	—	—	—	—
1998–99	Albany River Rats	AHL	61	1	1	2	213	1	0	0	0	0
1999–00	Albany River Rats	AHL	37	0	0	0	115	—	—	—	—	—
2000–01	Albany River Rats	AHL	38	0	0	0	105	—	—	—	—	—
2001–02	Albany River Rats	AHL	2	0	0	0	22	—	—	—	—	—
2001–02	Mississippi Sea Wolves	ECHL	29	1	3	4	161	—	—	—	—	—
2001–02	Portland Pirates	AHL	33	0	3	3	87	—	—	—	—	—
2002–03	Albany River Rats	AHL	42	2	3	5	165	—	—	—	—	—
2003–04	New Jersey Devils	NHL	8	1	0	1	22	—	—	—	—	—
2003–04	Albany River Rats	AHL	36	1	0	1	137	—	—	—	—	—
2004–05	Albany River Rats	AHL	52	0	2	2	184	—	—	—	—	—
AHL totals			354	4	11	15	1284	1	0	0	0	0
NHL totals			8	1	0	1	22	—	—	—	—	—
