= Branko Radivojevič =

Slovak ice hockey player (born 1980)

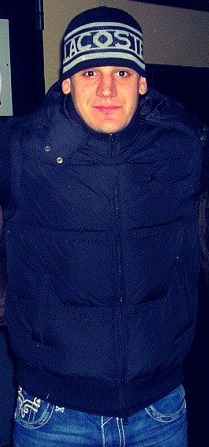
- Radivojevič in 2011
- Born: 24 November 1980 (age 45) Piešťany, Czechoslovakia
- Height: 6 ft 0 in (183 cm)
- Weight: 208 lb (94 kg; 14 st 12 lb)
- Position: Right wing
- Shot: Right
- Played for: HK Dukla Trenčín; Phoenix Coyotes; Philadelphia Flyers; Minnesota Wild; Atlant Moscow Oblast; Spartak Moscow; Neftekhimik Nizhnekamsk; Slovan Bratislava; HC Bílí Tygři Liberec
- National team: Slovakia
- NHL draft: 93rd overall, 1999; Colorado Avalanche
- Playing career: 1998–2019

Branko Radivojevič (Serbian: Бранко Радивојевић / Branko Radivojević; born 24 November 1980) is a Slovak former professional ice hockey player who began and finished his career playing for HK Dukla Trenčín of the Slovak Extraliga. He also played in the National Hockey League (NHL) with the Phoenix Coyotes, Philadelphia Flyers and Minnesota Wild from 2002 to 2008, and other leagues in Europe during his career, which lasted from 1998 to 2019.

== Playing career ==
Drafted by the Colorado Avalanche in 1999, Radivojevič signed a 3-year deal with the Phoenix Coyotes on 19 June 2001 and played parts of the next three seasons there. Part of a mid-season trade in 2003–04, he was sent to the Philadelphia Flyers along with Sean Burke and the rights to Ben Eager for Mike Comrie. After 2005–06, the Flyers declined to tender him a qualifying offer, thus making him an unrestricted free agent. He signed with the Minnesota Wild as an unrestricted free agent on 6 July 2006. After a couple seasons with the Wild, he opted to go to the KHL.

After two years with the Wild, Radivojevič signed with Spartak Moscow of the Kontinental Hockey League (KHL). In the 2008–09 season Branko established himself as an offensive presence with Spartak, leading the team in scoring with 45 points in 49 games. He was re-signed to a further two-year contract with Spartak on 23 December 2009.

After three seasons with Spartak (during the last one he was the captain of the team) Branko decided to change the team. After some arguments with Spartak's management his contract was terminated and Branko signed with Atlant Moscow Oblast. After spending only one season with Atlant (2011–2012) he returned to Spartak. For 2013-14 season he signed with Neftekhimik Nizhnekamsk, but changed the team during the season for Slovan Bratislava.

In the 2014–15 season, Radivojevic returned to his original hometown club in HK Dukla Trenčín of the Slovak Extraliga. However, after just 12 games he left for the Czech Extraliga, signing for the remainder of the season with HC Bílí Tygři Liberec on 14 October 2014.

Returning for a third stint with Dukla, Radivojevic played the final two seasons of his 21-year career before announcing his retirement upon the conclusion of the 2018–19 season on 20 March 2019.

== Personal ==
Branko's father Matija, a Bosnian Serb, came to Czechoslovakia during the 1970s as a contractor of a Yugoslavian company. His son, Luka, is also a hockey player who currently plays for Boston College.

== Career statistics ==
=== Regular season and playoffs ===
			Regular season					Playoffs
Season	Team	League	GP	G	A	Pts	PIM	GP	G	A	Pts	PIM
1995–96	Dukla Trenčín	SVK U18	45	23	32	55	74	—	—	—	—	—
1996–97	Dukla Trenčín	SVK U18	53	41	38	79	56	—	—	—	—	—
1997–98	Dukla Trenčín	SVK U20	52	30	31	61	50	—	—	—	—	—
1997–98	Dukla Trenčín	SVK	1	0	0	0	2	—	—	—	—	—
1998–99	Belleville Bulls	OHL	68	20	38	58	61	21	7	17	24	18
1999–00	Belleville Bulls	OHL	59	23	49	72	86	16	5	8	13	32
2000–01	Belleville Bulls	OHL	61	34	70	104	77	10	6	10	16	18
2001–02	Phoenix Coyotes	NHL	18	4	2	6	4	1	0	0	0	2
2001–02	Springfield Falcons	AHL	62	18	21	39	64	—	—	—	—	—
2002–03	Phoenix Coyotes	NHL	79	12	15	27	63	—	—	—	—	—
2003–04	Phoenix Coyotes	NHL	53	9	14	23	36	—	—	—	—	—
2003–04	Philadelphia Flyers	NHL	24	1	8	9	36	18	1	1	2	32
2004–05	Vsetínská hokejová	ELH	31	7	11	18	114	—	—	—	—	—
2004–05	Luleå HF	SEL	10	6	4	11	8	4	0	0	0	44
2005–06	Philadelphia Flyers	NHL	64	8	6	14	44	5	1	0	1	0
2006–07	Minnesota Wild	NHL	82	11	13	24	21	5	0	0	0	2
2007–08	Minnesota Wild	NHL	73	7	10	17	48	2	0	0	0	0
2008–09	Spartak Moscow	KHL	49	17	26	43	86	6	2	1	3	6
2009–10	Spartak Moscow	KHL	56	18	37	55	115	9	0	5	5	33
2010–11	Spartak Moscow	KHL	54	7	23	30	51	4	2	3	5	2
2011–12	Atlant Moscow Oblast	KHL	43	7	20	27	24	12	5	2	7	10
2012–13	Spartak Moscow	KHL	50	4	17	21	23	—	—	—	—	—
2013–14	Neftekhimik Nizhnekamsk	KHL	14	2	1	3	2	—	—	—	—	—
2013–14	Slovan Bratislava	KHL	31	3	5	8	22	—	—	—	—	—
2014–15	Dukla Trenčín	SVK	12	5	6	11	0	—	—	—	—	—
2014–15	HC Bílí Tygři Liberec	ELH	37	6	15	21	36	—	—	—	—	—
2015–16	HC Bílí Tygři Liberec	ELH	51	15	26	41	71	14	5	12	17	6
2016–17	HC Bílí Tygři Liberec	ELH	52	9	24	33	20	16	4	6	10	10
2017–18	Dukla Trenčín	SVK	45	16	29	45	49	17	8	9	17	36
2018–19	Dukla Trenčín	SVK	56	13	30	43	44	4	0	2	2	4
2019–20	Dukla Trenčín	SVK	2	1	0	1	2	—	—	—	—	—
NHL totals			399	52	68	120	252	31	2	1	3	36
KHL totals			297	58	129	187	323	31	9	11	20	51

=== International ===
Medal record

Representing Slovakia

Men's ice hockey

World Championships
Silver medal – second place	2012 Helsinki	
Bronze medal – third place	2003 Helsinki	

Year	Team	Event	GP	G	A	Pts	PIM
1998	Slovakia	EJC	6	0	0	0	4
2000	Slovakia	WJC	7	0	0	0	4
2003	Slovakia	WC	9	2	1	3	8
2004	Slovakia	WCH	4	0	1	1	2
2007	Slovakia	WC	7	2	1	3	6
2009	Slovakia	WC	6	0	1	1	4
2010	Slovakia	OLY	7	0	0	0	6
2011	Slovakia	WC	6	0	1	1	6
2012	Slovakia	WC	10	4	4	8	2
2013	Slovakia	WC	8	3	2	5	2
2014	Slovakia	OLY	4	0	0	0	0
Junior totals			13	0	0	0	8
Senior totals			61	11	11	22	36

== Awards and honours ==
Award	Year
OHL
First All-Star Team	2001
Jim Mahon Memorial Trophy	2001
NHL
YoungStars Game	2003
Slovak Extraliga
Playoffs MVP	2018

Awards and achievements
Preceded by Sheldon Keefe	Winner of the Jim Mahon Memorial Trophy; 2001	Succeeded by Mike Renzi
