= Robert Esche =

American ice hockey player (born 1978)

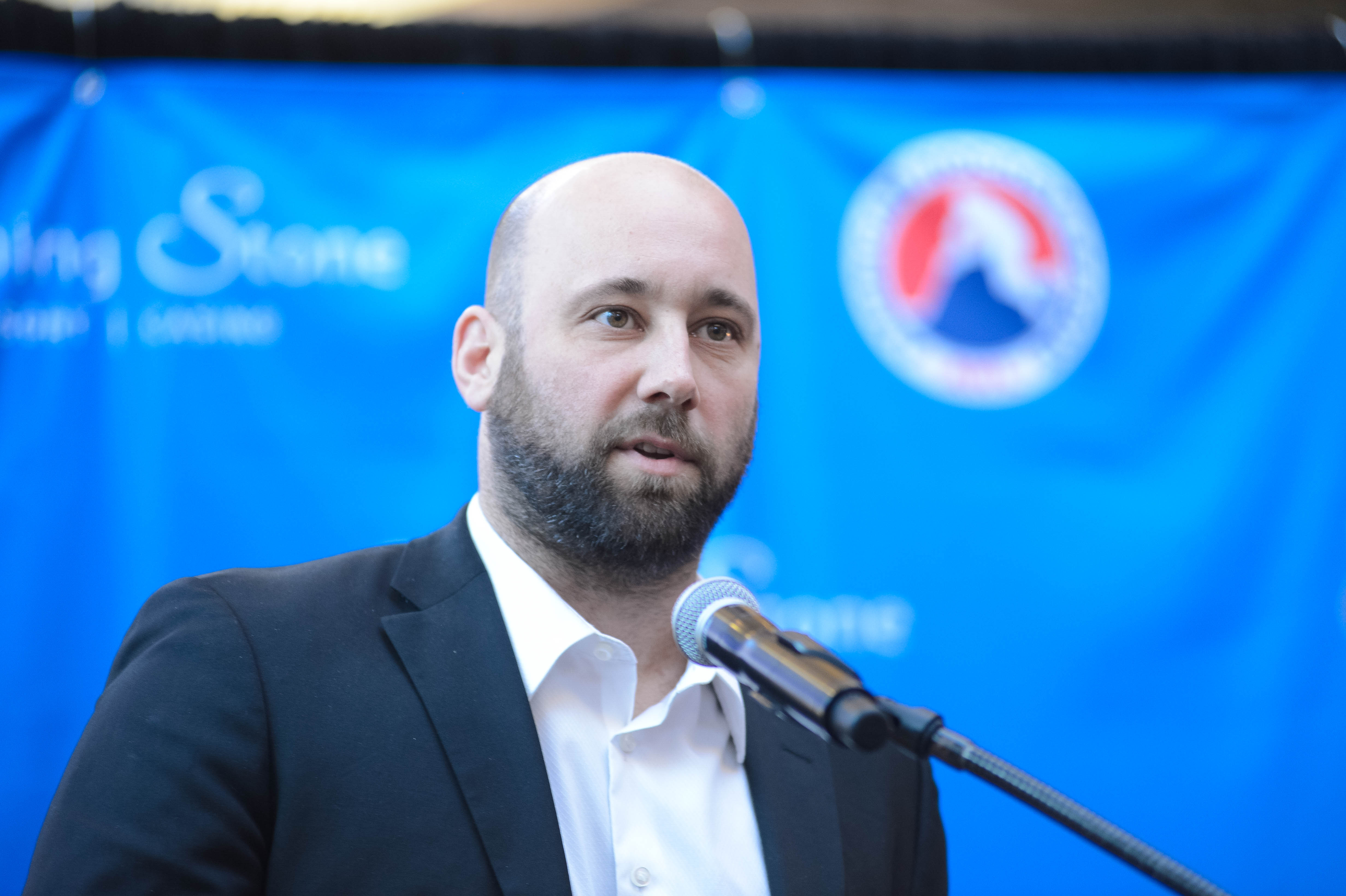
- Esche in 2018
- Born: January 22, 1978 (age 48) Whitesboro, New York, U.S.
- Height: 6 ft 2 in (188 cm)
- Weight: 225 lb (102 kg; 16 st 1 lb)
- Position: Goaltender
- Caught: Left
- Played for: Phoenix Coyotes; Philadelphia Flyers; Ak Bars Kazan; SKA Saint Petersburg; Dinamo Minsk; SCL Tigers
- National team: United States
- NHL draft: 139th overall, 1996; Phoenix Coyotes
- Playing career: 1998–2012

Robert L. Esche (born January 22, 1978) is an American former professional ice hockey goaltender who is the current president of the Utica Comets of the American Hockey League (AHL) and the Utica City FC of the Major Arena Soccer League (MASL). He previously played eight seasons in the National Hockey League (NHL) for the Phoenix Coyotes and Philadelphia Flyers.

== Playing career ==
Esche started his career with the Phoenix Coyotes, only to be traded to the Philadelphia Flyers in a deal involving Michal Handzuš and Brian Boucher. In 2004, he claimed the starting goaltending spot for the Flyers, and led them to the Eastern Conference Finals, only to fall in seven games to the eventual Stanley Cup champion Tampa Bay Lightning.

While playing in Russia for Ak Bars Kazan, he posted a record of 22–5–2 with a 2.01 goals against average (GAA) and a .912 save percentage, along with four shutouts.

Esche skated with Dinamo Minsk during the 2010–11 KHL season. In 2008–09, he posted a record of 21–14 with a 1.87 GAA and .912 save percentage, as well as nine shutouts.

On June 16, 2011, the SCL Tigers announced they had signed the 33-year-old Esche to a contract, where he played 40 games, going 15–25, with a 3.05 GAA and .898 save percentage.

== International play ==
Esche has represented the United States in the 1997 and 1998 World Junior Ice Hockey Championships and the IIHF World Championships in 2000, shutting out Russia in Russia, an accomplishment he still lists as his greatest moment in hockey. He represented the US team in 2001 and also received the starting nod at the 2004 World Cup of Hockey.

Esche was named to the 2006 US Men's Olympic Hockey Team in Turin. He played one game in the Olympic tournament, losing 5–4 to Russia.

Esche played for the 2008 Team USA Hockey team in the World Championships which took place in Canada. He had earned some starts after sitting out the first few games, including a 42 save performance in a controversial 3–2 loss against Finland. He also posted a 9–1 victory against Norway.

== Personal life ==
Esche has two children with his former wife Kelly.

Esche married Erica Hagan in August 2025.

Esche is nicknamed "Chico" after former NHL goaltender Chico Resch because his sticks were labeled R. Esche.

== Career statistics ==
=== Regular season and playoffs ===
			Regular season										Playoffs
Season	Team	League	GP	W	L	T	OTL	MIN	GA	SO	GAA	SV%	GP	W	L	MIN	GA	SO	GAA	SV%
1994–95	Gloucester Rangers	CJHL	20	10	6	0	—	1034	70	0	4.06	—	—	—	—	—	—	—	—	—
1995–96	Detroit Whalers	OHL	23	13	6	0	—	1139	71	1	3.74	.876	3	0	2	105	4	0	2.29	—
1996–97	Detroit Whalers	OHL	58	24	28	2	—	3241	206	2	3.81	.878	5	1	4	317	19	0	3.60	—
1997–98	Plymouth Whalers	OHL	48	29	13	4	—	2810	135	3	2.88	.896	15	8	7	868	45	0	3.11	.920
1998–99	Springfield Falcons	AHL	55	24	20	6	—	2957	138	1	2.80	.905	1	0	1	59	4	0	4.02	.867
1998–99	Phoenix Coyotes	NHL	3	0	1	0	—	130	7	0	3.23	.860	—	—	—	—	—	—	—	—
1999–00	Springfield Falcons	AHL	21	9	9	2	—	1207	61	2	3.03	.912	3	1	2	180	12	0	4.01	.878
1999–00	Houston Aeros	IHL	7	4	2	1	—	419	16	2	2.29	.922	—	—	—	—	—	—	—	—
1999–00	Phoenix Coyotes	NHL	8	2	5	0	—	408	23	0	3.38	.893	—	—	—	—	—	—	—	—
2000–01	Phoenix Coyotes	NHL	25	10	8	4	—	1350	68	2	3.02	.896	—	—	—	—	—	—	—	—
2001–02	Phoenix Coyotes	NHL	22	6	10	2	—	1145	52	1	2.72	.902	—	—	—	—	—	—	—	—
2001–02	Springfield Falcons	AHL	1	1	0	0	—	60	0	1	0.00	1.000	—	—	—	—	—	—	—	—
2002–03	Philadelphia Flyers	NHL	30	12	9	3	—	1638	60	2	2.20	.907	1	0	0	30	1	0	2.00	.929
2003–04	Philadelphia Flyers	NHL	40	21	11	7	—	2322	79	3	2.04	.915	18	11	7	1060	41	1	2.32	.918
2005–06	Philadelphia Flyers	NHL	40	22	11	—	5	2286	113	1	2.97	.897	6	2	4	314	22	0	4.20	.875
2006–07	Philadelphia Flyers	NHL	18	5	9	—	1	860	62	1	4.32	.872	—	—	—	—	—	—	—	—
2007–08	Ak Bars Kazan	RSL	18	—	—	—	—	1095	34	3	1.86	.926	10	—	—	609	25	1	2.46	.885
2008–09	SKA Saint Petersburg	KHL	38	21	14	—	6	2183	68	9	1.87	.912	3	0	3	185	8	0	2.59	.877
2009–10	SKA Saint Petersburg	KHL	42	29	7	—	5	2527	87	6	2.07	.917	4	1	3	236	9	0	2.29	.910
2010–11	Dinamo Minsk	KHL	24	5	14	—	5	1383	76	0	3.30	.897	4	2	1	216	7	0	1.94	.942
2011–12	SCL Tigers	NLA	40	15	25	—	0	2305	117	1	3.05	.898	—	—	—	—	—	—	—	—
KHL totals			104	55	35	—	16	6093	231	15	2.27	.910	11	3	7	637	24	0	2.26	.915
NHL totals			186	78	64	16	6	10,140	464	10	2.75	.900	25	13	11	1405	64	1	2.73	.907

=== International ===
Year	Team	Event	GP	W	L	T	MIN	GA	SO	GAA	SV%
1998	United States	WJC	4	2	2	0	238	13	0	3.28	.922
2000	United States	WC	2	1	0	1	120	1	1	0.50	.984
2001	United States	WC	6	4	2	0	359	13	0	2.17	.931
2004	United States	WCH	4	1	3	0	237	10	0	2.53	.909
2006	United States	OLY	1	0	1	0	59	5	0	5.10	.762
2008	United States	WC	4	2	2	—	198	7	0	2.12	.931
2009	United States	WC	8	3	5	—	480	25	0	3.12	.891
Junior totals			4	2	2	0	238	13	0	3.28	.922
Senior totals			25	11	13	1	1453	61	1	2.52	.913

== Awards and accomplishments ==
- 1997–98: Second All-Star Team (OHL)
- 1998–99: All-Rookie Team (AHL)
- 2002–03: William M. Jennings Trophy shared with Roman Čechmánek, PHI and Martin Brodeur, NJ (NHL)
- 2002–03: Yanick Dupre Memorial (Philadelphia Flyers)
- 2003–04: Pelle Lindbergh Memorial (Philadelphia Flyers)
- 2008 World Championships: Best save percentage (.931)
- 2008–09: Played in KHL All-Star Game

Preceded by Patrick Roy	Tri-winner of the Jennings Trophy (with Roman Cechmanek and Martin Brodeur); 2003	Succeeded by Martin Brodeur
