= Radovan Somík =

Slovak ice hockey player

- Born: 5 May 1977 (age 47); Martin, Czechoslovakia
- Height: 6 ft 2 in (188 cm)
- Weight: 194 lb (88 kg; 13 st 12 lb)
- Position: Left wing
- Shot: Right
- Played for: MHC Martin (SVK); Zlín HPS HC (CZE); Philadelphia Flyers (NHL); Vsetin HC (CZE); Malmö IF (SEL); Severstal Cherepovets (RSL); Pardubice HC (CZE)
- National team: Slovakia
- NHL draft: 100th overall, 1995; Philadelphia Flyers
- Playing career: 1994–2014

Radovan Somík (born 5 May 1977) is a Slovak former professional ice hockey player who played in the National Hockey League (NHL), Slovak Extraliga, Czech Extraliga, Swedish Hockey League, and Russian Super League. He played two NHL seasons for the Philadelphia Flyers from 2002 to 2004. He spent the final seven seasons of his career playing for Pardubice HC in the Czech Extraliga.

== Career statistics ==
=== Regular season and playoffs ===
			Regular season					Playoffs
Season	Team	League	GP	G	A	Pts	PIM	GP	G	A	Pts	PIM
1993–94	HC Hutník ZŤS Martin	SVK	1	0	0	0	0	—	—	—	—	—
1994–95	Martinskeho HC	SVK	25	4	0	4	29	—	—	—	—	—
1996–97	Martinskeho HC	SVK	38	3	5	8	36	—	—	—	—	—
1997–98	Martinskeho HC	SVK	31	6	9	15	10	—	—	—	—	—
1998–99	Dukla Trenčín	SVK	26	1	4	5	6	—	—	—	—	—
1999–00	Martinskeho HC	SVK-2	43	40	28	68	32	—	—	—	—	—
2000–01	HC Continental Zlín	CZE	46	15	10	25	22	6	1	0	1	0
2001–02	HC Continental Zlín	CZE	37	14	14	28	22	11	4	3	7	37
2002–03	Philadelphia Flyers	NHL	60	8	10	18	10	5	1	1	2	6
2003–04	Philadelphia Flyers	NHL	53	4	10	14	17	10	1	1	2	4
2003–04	Philadelphia Phantoms	AHL	1	0	0	0	2	—	—	—	—	—
2004–05	HC Martimex ZŤS Martin	SVK-2	2	1	0	1	0	—	—	—	—	—
2004–05	Vsetínská hokejová	CZE	31	7	16	23	24	—	—	—	—	—
2004–05	Malmö Redhawks	SEL	8	1	0	1	6	—	—	—	—	—
2005–06	Severstal Cherepovets	RSL	37	5	15	20	20	4	1	1	2	0
2006–07	Severstal Cherepovets	RSL	54	6	19	25	45	5	1	0	1	2
2007–08	HC Moeller Pardubice	CZE	49	10	7	17	20	—	—	—	—	—
2008–09	HC Moeller Pardubice	CZE	43	13	14	27	8	7	0	0	0	0
2009–10	HC Eaton Pardubice	CZE	49	15	18	33	28	13	6	2	8	4
2010–11	HC Eaton Pardubice	CZE	46	16	15	31	16	9	2	1	3	2
2011–12	HC ČSOB Pojišťovna Pardubice	CZE	35	9	9	18	10	19	6	7	13	8
2012–13	HC ČSOB Pojišťovna Pardubice	CZE	51	14	15	29	18	5	1	1	2	0
2013–14	HC ČSOB Pojišťovna Pardubice	CZE	38	10	8	18	22	—	—	—	—	—
CZE totals			425	123	126	249	190	73	20	14	34	55
NHL totals			113	12	20	32	27	15	2	2	4	10

=== International ===
Year	Team	Event	GP	G	A	Pts	PIM
1995	Slovakia	WJC B	7	3	0	3	2
1995	Slovakia	EJC B	5	0	1	1	25
1996	Slovakia	WJC	6	1	1	2	2
1997	Slovakia	WJC	6	2	3	5	0
2001	Slovakia	WC	6	0	0	0	0
2002	Slovakia	WC	9	0	3	3	2
2004	Slovakia	WCH	1	0	0	0	0
2007	Slovakia	WC	6	1	1	2	2
2008	Slovakia	WC	4	0	0	0	2
Junior totals			24	6	5	11	29
Senior totals			26	1	4	5	6
