= Claude Lapointe =

Canadian former ice hockey player (born 1968)

- Born: October 11, 1968 (age 57) Lachine, Quebec, Canada
- Height: 5 ft 9 in (175 cm)
- Weight: 214 lb (97 kg; 15 st 4 lb)
- Position: Centre
- Shot: Left
- Played for: Quebec Nordiques; Colorado Avalanche; Calgary Flames; New York Islanders; Philadelphia Flyers; SC Bern
- National team: Canada
- NHL draft: 234th overall, 1988; Quebec Nordiques
- Playing career: 1989–2007

Claude Lapointe (born October 11, 1968) is a Canadian former ice hockey player. He played in the National Hockey League for the Quebec Nordiques, Colorado Avalanche, Calgary Flames, New York Islanders, and Philadelphia Flyers between 1991 and 2004.

== Early life ==
Lapointe grew up in the city of Lachine, Quebec. He played in the Quebec Major Junior Hockey League. He was offered a scholarship by the University of Michigan, but he refused it.

== Playing career ==
He was drafted by the Nordiques in the 12th round of the 1988 NHL Draft, with the 234th overall pick. Lapointe spent most of his NHL career with the New York Islanders. He was there from the 1996–97 season to the 2002–03 season. While with the New York Islanders, he received many honors such as many NYI Fan club MVP awards and three Bob Nystrom awards, which is awarded to the player who most exemplifies leadership, hustle, and dedication. He also received awards for reaching the 800 game mark, and for scoring over 100 goals. Other achievements include being named assistant captain with the Islanders, ranking among the top 3 in the NHL for face-off win percentage for 15 years consecutively, spanning his entire career. Similarly, Lapointe was among the league's elite in terms of physical conditioning. In 1999, he represented Canada at the 1999 World Championships. He retired in 2004.

== Personal life ==
Lapointe has two sons: Kirk and Kody. He coaches and trains hockey players both on ice and off ice.

== Career statistics ==
=== Regular season and playoffs ===
			Regular season					Playoffs
Season	Team	League	GP	G	A	Pts	PIM	GP	G	A	Pts	PIM
1985–86	Trois-Rivières Draveurs	QMJHL	72	19	38	57	74	5	2	4	6	14
1986–87	Trois-Rivières Draveurs	QMJHL	70	47	57	104	123	—	—	—	—	—
1987–88	Laval Titan	QMJHL	69	37	83	120	143	13	2	17	19	53
1988–89	Laval Titan	QMJHL	63	32	72	104	158	17	5	14	19	66
1988–89	Laval Titan	M-Cup	—	—	—	—	—	4	2	2	4	4
1989–90	Halifax Citadels	AHL	63	18	19	37	51	6	1	1	2	34
1990–91	Quebec Nordiques	NHL	13	2	2	4	4	—	—	—	—	—
1990–91	Halifax Citadels	AHL	43	17	17	34	46	—	—	—	—	—
1991–92	Quebec Nordiques	NHL	78	13	20	33	86	—	—	—	—	—
1992–93	Quebec Nordiques	NHL	74	10	26	36	98	6	2	4	6	8
1993–94	Quebec Nordiques	NHL	59	11	17	28	70	—	—	—	—	—
1994–95	Quebec Nordiques	NHL	29	4	8	12	41	5	0	0	0	8
1995–96	Colorado Avalanche	NHL	3	0	0	0	0	—	—	—	—	—
1995–96	Calgary Flames	NHL	32	4	5	9	20	2	0	0	0	0
1995–96	Saint John Flames	AHL	12	5	3	8	10	—	—	—	—	—
1996–97	New York Islanders	NHL	73	13	5	18	49	—	—	—	—	—
1996–97	Utah Grizzlies	IHL	9	7	6	13	14	—	—	—	—	—
1997–98	New York Islanders	NHL	78	10	10	20	47	—	—	—	—	—
1998–99	New York Islanders	NHL	82	14	23	37	62	—	—	—	—	—
1999–00	New York Islanders	NHL	76	15	16	31	60	—	—	—	—	—
2000–01	New York Islanders	NHL	80	9	23	32	56	—	—	—	—	—
2001–02	New York Islanders	NHL	80	9	12	21	60	7	0	0	0	14
2002–03	New York Islanders	NHL	66	6	6	12	20	—	—	—	—	—
2002–03	Philadelphia Flyers	NHL	14	2	2	4	16	13	2	3	5	14
2003–04	Philadelphia Flyers	NHL	42	5	3	8	32	1	0	0	0	0
2003–04	Philadelphia Phantoms	AHL	2	1	1	2	0	—	—	—	—	—
2006–07	SC Bern	NLA	4	0	0	0	0	—	—	—	—	—
2007–08	Trois-Rivières Caron & Guay	LNAH	18	1	12	13	27	—	—	—	—	—
NHL totals			879	127	178	305	721	34	4	7	11	44

=== International ===
Year	Team	Event	GP	G	A	Pts	PIM
1999	Canada	WC	10	1	3	4	10
Senior totals			10	1	3	4	10
