= 2003–04 St. Louis Blues season =

National Hockey League team season

2003–04 St. Louis Blues
- Division: 2nd Central
- Conference: 7th Western
- 2003–04 record: 39–30–11–2
- Home record: 23–11–7–0
- Road record: 16–19–4–2
- Goals for: 191
- Goals against: 198

Team information
- General manager: Larry Pleau
- Coach: Joel Quenneville (Oct.–Feb.); Mike Kitchen (Feb.–Apr.)
- Captain: Al MacInnis (Note: MacInnis played only three games before eye surgery ended his season. The Blues opted to go with three alternate captains for the remainder of the season.)
- Alternate captains: Scott Mellanby; Keith Tkachuk; Doug Weight
- Arena: Savvis Center
- Average attendance: 18,560
- Minor league affiliates: Worcester IceCats; Peoria Rivermen

Team leaders
- Goals: Keith Tkachuk (33)
- Assists: Doug Weight (51)
- Points: Keith Tkachuk (71)
- Penalty minutes: Mike Danton (141); Reed Low (141)
- Plus/minus: Petr Cajanek (+12)
- Wins: Chris Osgood (31)
- Goals against average: Chris Osgood (2.24)

The 2003–04 St. Louis Blues season was the 37th for the franchise in St. Louis, Missouri. The Blues qualified for the Stanley Cup playoffs for the 25th straight seasons, the team's final playoff appearance until 2009. After finishing the regular season with a record of 39 wins, 30 losses, 11 ties and two overtime losses, the Blues were eliminated in the Western Conference Quarterfinals in five games by the San Jose Sharks.

== Off-season ==
Chris Pronger resigned the team captaincy in favor of veteran defenseman Al MacInnis.

== Regular season ==
On February 24, 2004, head coach Joel Quenneville was fired and replaced by assistant coach Mike Kitchen.

=== Final standings ===
Central Division
No.	CR		GP	W	L	T	OTL	GF	GA	Pts
1	1	**Detroit Red Wings**	82	48	21	11	2	255	189	109
2	7	**St. Louis Blues**	82	39	30	11	2	191	198	91
3	8	**Nashville Predators**	82	38	29	11	4	216	217	91
4	14	Columbus Blue Jackets	82	25	45	8	4	177	238	62
5	15	Chicago Blackhawks	82	20	43	11	8	188	259	59

Note: CR = Conference rank; GP = Games played; W = Wins; L = Losses; T = Ties; OTL = Overtime loss; GF = Goals for; GA = Goals against; Pts = Points
Bolded teams qualified for the playoffs.

Western Conference
R		Div	GP	W	L	T	OTL	GF	GA	Pts
**1**	**P-** Detroit Red Wings	**CE**	**82**	**48**	**21**	**11**	**2**	**255**	**189**	109
**2**	**Y-** San Jose Sharks	**PA**	**82**	**43**	**21**	**12**	**6**	**255**	**183**	104
**3**	**Y-** Vancouver Canucks	**NW**	**82**	**43**	**24**	**10**	**5**	**235**	**194**	101
**4**	**X-** Colorado Avalanche	**NW**	**82**	**40**	**22**	**13**	**7**	**236**	**198**	100
**5**	**X-** Dallas Stars	**PA**	**82**	**41**	**26**	**13**	**2**	**194**	**175**	97
**6**	**X-** Calgary Flames	**NW**	**82**	**42**	**30**	**7**	**3**	**200**	**176**	94
**7**	**X-** St. Louis Blues	**CE**	**82**	**39**	**30**	**11**	**2**	**191**	**198**	91
**8**	**X-** Nashville Predators	**CE**	**82**	**38**	**29**	**11**	**4**	**216**	**217**	91
8.5
9	Edmonton Oilers	NW	82	36	29	12	5	221	208	89
10	Minnesota Wild	NW	82	30	29	20	3	188	183	83
11	Los Angeles Kings	PA	82	28	29	16	9	205	217	81
12	Mighty Ducks of Anaheim	PA	82	29	35	10	8	184	213	76
13	Phoenix Coyotes	PA	82	22	36	18	6	188	245	68
14	Columbus Blue Jackets	CE	82	25	45	8	4	177	238	62
15	Chicago Blackhawks	CE	82	20	43	11	8	188	259	59

Divisions: CE – Central, PA – Pacific, NW – Northwest

P – Clinched Presidents Trophy; Y – Clinched division; X – Clinched playoff spot

== Schedule and results ==
=== Regular season ===
2003–04 regular season
October: 6–2–0–1 (home: 2–0–0–0; road: 4–2–0–1)

Game	Date	Score	Opponent	Record	Recap
1	October 10, 2003	1–2 OT	@ Phoenix Coyotes (2003–04)	0–0–0–1	OTL
2	October 12, 2003	2–1	@ Colorado Avalanche (2003–04)	1–0–0–1	W
3	October 16, 2003	1–4	@ Nashville Predators (2003–04)	1–1–0–1	L
4	October 18, 2003	4–1	Washington Capitals (2003–04)	2–1–0–1	W
5	October 21, 2003	6–4	@ Edmonton Oilers (2003–04)	3–1–0–1	W
6	October 22, 2003	2–3	@ Vancouver Canucks (2003–04)	3–2–0–1	L
7	October 24, 2003	2–1	@ Calgary Flames (2003–04)	4–2–0–1	W
8	October 28, 2003	1–0	Nashville Predators (2003–04)	5–2–0–1	W
9	October 29, 2003	6–5	@ Detroit Red Wings (2003–04)	6–2–0–1	W

November: 7–4–1–0 (home: 5–2–0–0; road: 2–2–1–0)

Game	Date	Score	Opponent	Record	Recap
10	November 1, 2003	2–3	Chicago Blackhawks (2003–04)	6–3–0–1	L
11	November 4, 2003	2–1 OT	Mighty Ducks of Anaheim (2003–04)	7–3–0–1	W
12	November 6, 2003	3–2	Vancouver Canucks (2003–04)	8–3–0–1	W
13	November 8, 2003	2–0	Florida Panthers (2003–04)	9–3–0–1	W
14	November 13, 2003	4–3 OT	@ San Jose Sharks (2003–04)	10–3–0–1	W
15	November 15, 2003	1–0	@ Los Angeles Kings (2003–04)	11–3–0–1	W
16	November 16, 2003	3–4	@ Mighty Ducks of Anaheim (2003–04)	11–4–0–1	L
17	November 19, 2003	4–5	@ Phoenix Coyotes (2003–04)	11–5–0–1	L
18	November 22, 2003	2–1	Dallas Stars (2003–04)	12–5–0–1	W
19	November 25, 2003	4–3 OT	Boston Bruins (2003–04)	13–5–0–1	W
20	November 28, 2003	2–2 OT	@ Tampa Bay Lightning (2003–04)	13–5–1–1	T
21	November 29, 2003	1–2	Detroit Red Wings (2003–04)	13–6–1–1	L

December: 8–3–3–0 (home: 5–1–3–0; road: 3–2–0–0)

Game	Date	Score	Opponent	Record	Recap
22	December 2, 2003	4–1	Los Angeles Kings (2003–04)	14–6–1–1	W
23	December 4, 2003	4–4 OT	Detroit Red Wings (2003–04)	14–6–2–1	T
24	December 6, 2003	4–1	Nashville Predators (2003–04)	15–6–2–1	W
25	December 9, 2003	3–2 OT	@ Toronto Maple Leafs (2003–04)	16–6–2–1	W
26	December 12, 2003	3–2 OT	@ Columbus Blue Jackets (2003–04)	17–6–2–1	W
27	December 13, 2003	2–1	Los Angeles Kings (2003–04)	18–6–2–1	W
28	December 16, 2003	2–1 OT	Columbus Blue Jackets (2003–04)	19–6–2–1	W
29	December 18, 2003	4–2	San Jose Sharks (2003–04)	20–6–2–1	W
30	December 20, 2003	1–1 OT	Phoenix Coyotes (2003–04)	20–6–3–1	T
31	December 22, 2003	1–2	@ Detroit Red Wings (2003–04)	20–7–3–1	L
32	December 23, 2003	0–3	@ Chicago Blackhawks (2003–04)	20–8–3–1	L
33	December 26, 2003	3–3 OT	Colorado Avalanche (2003–04)	20–8–4–1	T
34	December 29, 2003	3–2	@ Columbus Blue Jackets (2003–04)	21–8–4–1	W
35	December 30, 2003	2–7	Philadelphia Flyers (2003–04)	21–9–4–1	L

January: 4–9–3–0 (home: 3–4–2–0; road: 1–5–1–0)

Game	Date	Score	Opponent	Record	Recap
36	January 1, 2004	5–4	New York Rangers (2003–04)	22–9–4–1	W
37	January 3, 2004	1–3	San Jose Sharks (2003–04)	22–10–4–1	L
38	January 5, 2004	1–1 OT	Minnesota Wild (2003–04)	22–10–5–1	T
39	January 6, 2004	0–2	@ Carolina Hurricanes (2003–04)	22–11–5–1	L
40	January 10, 2004	1–3	@ Nashville Predators (2003–04)	22–12–5–1	L
41	January 12, 2004	7–4	Chicago Blackhawks (2003–04)	23–12–5–1	W
42	January 13, 2004	2–5	@ Montreal Canadiens (2003–04)	23–13–5–1	L
43	January 15, 2004	5–3	Columbus Blue Jackets (2003–04)	24–13–5–1	W
44	January 17, 2004	2–2 OT	Minnesota Wild (2003–04)	24–13–6–1	T
45	January 19, 2004	2–1 OT	@ Florida Panthers (2003–04)	25–13–6–1	W
46	January 21, 2004	1–3	@ Columbus Blue Jackets (2003–04)	25–14–6–1	L
47	January 23, 2004	0–2	@ Dallas Stars (2003–04)	25–15–6–1	L
48	January 24, 2004	2–3	Dallas Stars (2003–04)	25–16–6–1	L
49	January 28, 2004	1–1 OT	@ Atlanta Thrashers (2003–04)	25–16–7–1	T
50	January 29, 2004	2–4	Vancouver Canucks (2003–04)	25–17–7–1	L
51	January 31, 2004	1–4	New Jersey Devils (2003–04)	25–18–7–1	L

February: 4–7–1–1 (home: 3–1–0–0; road: 1–6–1–1)

Game	Date	Score	Opponent	Record	Recap
52	February 2, 2004	0–4	@ Minnesota Wild (2003–04)	25–19–7–1	L
53	February 4, 2004	3–5	@ Edmonton Oilers (2003–04)	25–20–7–1	L
54	February 5, 2004	2–1	@ Calgary Flames (2003–04)	26–20–7–1	W
55	February 10, 2004	1–3	@ Ottawa Senators (2003–04)	26–21–7–1	L
56	February 12, 2004	0–4	Colorado Avalanche (2003–04)	26–22–7–1	L
57	February 14, 2004	3–2 OT	Pittsburgh Penguins (2003–04)	27–22–7–1	W
58	February 16, 2004	4–2	Phoenix Coyotes (2003–04)	28–22–7–1	W
59	February 19, 2004	4–3 OT	Tampa Bay Lightning (2003–04)	29–22–7–1	W
60	February 20, 2004	1–5	@ Detroit Red Wings (2003–04)	29–23–7–1	L
61	February 22, 2004	2–3 OT	@ Chicago Blackhawks (2003–04)	29–23–7–2	OTL
62	February 26, 2004	2–2 OT	@ Colorado Avalanche (2003–04)	29–23–8–2	T
63	February 28, 2004	0–2	@ Vancouver Canucks (2003–04)	29–24–8–2	L
64	February 29, 2004	0–1	@ San Jose Sharks (2003–04)	29–25–8–2	L

March: 9–3–3–0 (home: 5–2–2–0; road: 4–1–1–0)

Game	Date	Score	Opponent	Record	Recap
65	March 2, 2004	2–4	Calgary Flames (2003–04)	29–26–8–2	L
66	March 4, 2004	1–1 OT	Edmonton Oilers (2003–04)	29–26–9–2	T
67	March 6, 2004	4–2	@ New York Islanders (2003–04)	30–26–9–2	W
68	March 7, 2004	5–1	@ Buffalo Sabres (2003–04)	31–26–9–2	W
69	March 9, 2004	3–2 OT	New York Islanders (2003–04)	32–26–9–2	W
70	March 11, 2004	1–1 OT	Nashville Predators (2003–04)	32–26–10–2	T
71	March 13, 2004	5–3	Columbus Blue Jackets (2003–04)	33–26–10–2	W
72	March 14, 2004	0–3	Calgary Flames (2003–04)	33–27–10–2	L
73	March 16, 2004	5–3	@ Los Angeles Kings (2003–04)	34–27–10–2	W
74	March 17, 2004	1–1 OT	@ Mighty Ducks of Anaheim (2003–04)	34–27–11–2	T
75	March 20, 2004	1–3	@ Dallas Stars (2003–04)	34–28–11–2	L
76	March 25, 2004	3–2	Mighty Ducks of Anaheim (2003–04)	35–28–11–2	W
77	March 27, 2004	4–3 OT	Chicago Blackhawks (2003–04)	36–28–11–2	W
78	March 28, 2004	3–1	@ Chicago Blackhawks (2003–04)	37–28–11–2	W
79	March 30, 2004	1–0	Edmonton Oilers (2003–04)	38–28–11–2	W

April: 1–2–0–0 (home: 0–1–0–0; road: 1–1–0–0)

Game	Date	Score	Opponent	Record	Recap
80	April 1, 2004	2–3	Detroit Red Wings (2003–04)	38–29–11–2	L
81	April 3, 2004	4–1	@ Nashville Predators (2003–04)	39–29–11–2	W
82	April 4, 2004	0–3	@ Minnesota Wild (2003–04)	39–30–11–2	L

Legend: W Win (2 points) L Loss (0 points) T Tie (1 point) OTL Overtime loss (1 point)

=== Playoffs ===
2004 Stanley Cup playoffs
Western Conference Quarterfinals vs. (2) San Jose Sharks: San Jose won 4–1

Game	Date	Visitor	Score	Home	OT	Decision	Attendance	Series	Recap
1	April 8	St. Louis	0–1	San Jose	OT	Osgood	17,496	Sharks lead 1–0	L
2	April 10	St. Louis	1–3	San Jose		Osgood	17,496	Sharks lead 2–0	L
3	April 12	San Jose	1–4	St. Louis		Osgood	19,023	Sharks lead 2–1	W
4	April 13	San Jose	4–3	St. Louis		Osgood	19,452	Sharks lead 3–1	L
5	April 15	St. Louis	1–3	San Jose		Osgood	17,496	Sharks win 4–1	L

Legend: W Win L Loss

== Player statistics ==
=== Scoring ===
- Position abbreviations: C = Center; D = Defense; G = Goaltender; LW = Left wing; RW = Right wing
- † = Joined team via a transaction (e.g., trade, waivers, signing) during the season. Stats reflect time with the Blues only.
- ‡ = Left team via a transaction (e.g., trade, waivers, release) during the season. Stats reflect time with the Blues only.

No.	Player	Pos	Regular season						Playoffs					
No.	Player	Pos	GP	G	A	Pts	+/-	PIM	GP	G	A	Pts	+/-	PIM
7	Keith Tkachuk	LW	75	33	38	71	8	83	5	0	2	2	−1	10
39	Doug Weight	C	75	14	51	65	−3	37	5	2	1	3	−4	6
38	Pavol Demitra	LW	68	23	35	58	1	18	5	1	0	1	1	4
44	Chris Pronger	D	80	14	40	54	−1	88	5	0	1	1	1	16
10	Dallas Drake	RW	79	13	22	35	10	65	5	1	1	2	−1	2
19	Scott Mellanby	RW	68	14	17	31	−7	76	4	0	1	1	−4	2
26	Petr Cajanek	RW	70	12	14	26	12	16	5	0	2	2	3	2
42	Mark Rycroft	RW	71	9	12	21	2	32	3	0	0	0	−1	2
20	Eric Nickulas‡	RW	44	7	11	18	−2	44	—	—	—	—	—	—
55	Christian Backman	D	66	5	13	18	3	16	5	0	2	2	2	4
22	Mike Danton	C	68	7	5	12	−8	141	5	1	0	1	1	2
21	Jamal Mayers	RW	80	6	5	11	−19	91	5	0	0	0	1	0
17	Ryan Johnson	C	69	4	7	11	−2	8	3	0	0	0	0	0
33	Eric Boguniecki	C	27	6	4	10	−1	20	1	0	0	0	0	0
18	Mike Sillinger†	C	16	5	5	10	4	14	5	3	1	4	5	6
29	Alexander Khavanov	D	48	3	7	10	2	18	—	—	—	—	—	—
6	Eric Weinrich†	D	26	2	8	10	1	14	5	0	1	1	−1	0
27	Bryce Salvador	D	69	3	5	8	−4	47	5	0	0	0	−2	2
49	Brian Savage†	LW	13	4	3	7	−3	2	5	1	1	2	−3	0
23	Murray Baron	D	80	1	5	6	−6	61	5	0	0	0	0	6
15	Peter Sejna	LW	20	2	2	4	−9	4	—	—	—	—	—	—
25	Pascal Rheaume†	C	25	1	3	4	−3	4	3	0	0	0	−1	2
9	Jeff Heerema‡	RW	22	1	2	3	−5	4	—	—	—	—	—	—
5	Barret Jackman	D	15	1	2	3	−1	41	—	—	—	—	—	—
34	Reed Low	RW	57	0	2	2	−6	141	—	—	—	—	—	—
2	Al MacInnis	D	3	0	2	2	−1	6	—	—	—	—	—	—
12	Steve Martins	C	25	1	0	1	−7	22	1	0	0	0	−1	0
37	Jeff Finley	D	53	0	1	1	−9	34	1	0	0	0	0	2
46	Christian Laflamme	D	16	0	1	1	−3	20	—	—	—	—	—	—
28	Matt Walker	D	14	0	1	1	0	25	4	0	0	0	−2	0
32	Aris Brimanis	D	13	0	0	0	0	4	—	—	—	—	—	—
50	Reinhard Divis	G	13	0	0	0		2	1	0	0	0		0
35	Brent Johnson‡	G	10	0	0	0		0	—	—	—	—	—	—
80	Steve McLaren	D	6	0	0	0	0	25	—	—	—	—	—	—
30	Chris Osgood	G	67	0	0	0		10	5	0	1	1		0
18	Scott Pellerin†	LW	2	0	0	0	−3	2	—	—	—	—	—	—
25	John Pohl	C	1	0	0	0	−2	0	—	—	—	—	—	—
9	Jame Pollock	D	9	0	0	0	−1	6	—	—	—	—	—	—
43	Mike Stuart	D	2	0	0	0	0	0	—	—	—	—	—	—
70	Jeremy Yablonski†‡	LW	1	0	0	0	−1	5	—	—	—	—	—	—

=== Goaltending ===
- ‡ = Left team via a transaction (e.g., trade, waivers, release) during the season. Stats reflect time with the Blues only.

No.	Player	Regular season										Playoffs								
No.	Player	GP	W	L	T	SA	GA	GAA	SV%	SO	TOI	GP	W	L	SA	GA	GAA	SV%	SO	TOI
30	Chris Osgood	67	31	25	8	1604	144	2.24	.910	3	3861	5	1	4	109	12	2.51	.890	0	287
50	Reinhard Divis	13	4	4	2	291	29	2.77	.900	0	629	1	0	0	8	0	0.00	1.000	0	18
35	Brent Johnson‡	10	4	3	1	203	20	2.43	.901	1	493	—	—	—	—	—	—	—	—	—

== Awards and records ==
=== Awards ===
Type	Award/honor	Recipient	Ref
League (annual)	NHL Second All-Star Team	Chris Pronger (Defense)	
League (in-season)	NHL All-Star Game selection	Chris Pronger	
League (in-season)	NHL All-Star Game selection	Keith Tkachuk	
League (in-season)	NHL Defensive Player of the Month	Chris Osgood (March)	
League (in-season)	NHL Defensive Player of the Week	Chris Pronger (January 19)	

=== Milestones ===
Milestone	Player	Date	Ref
400th goal scored	Keith Tkachuk	October 12, 2003	
First game	Mike Stuart	October 24, 2003	
First game	John Pohl	November 1, 2003	
First game	Steve McLaren	December 16, 2003	
First game	Jeremy Yablonski	December 30, 2003	
First game	Jame Pollock	January 15, 2004	
600th assist	Doug Weight	March 27, 2004	

== Transactions ==
The Blues were involved in the following transactions from June 10, 2003, the day after the deciding game of the 2003 Stanley Cup Finals, through June 7, 2004, the day of the deciding game of the 2004 Stanley Cup Finals.

=== Trades ===
Date	Details		Ref
June 21, 2003	To Phoenix Coyotes: Tyson Nash	To St. Louis Blues: Conditional draft pick (Note: Either a 5th-round pick in 2003 or a 4th-round pick in 2004. St. Louis chose the 2003 pick.)	
June 21, 2003	To Tampa Bay Lightning: Cory Stillman	To St. Louis Blues: 2nd-round pick in 2003	
June 21, 2003	To New Jersey Devils: 3rd-round pick in 2003	To St. Louis Blues: Mike Danton; 3rd-round pick in 2003	
October 27, 2003	To Tampa Bay Lightning: 8th-round pick in 2004	To St. Louis Blues: Erkki Rajamaki	
February 9, 2004	To Philadelphia Flyers: 5th-round pick in 2004	To St. Louis Blues: Eric Weinrich	
March 4, 2004	To Phoenix Coyotes: Brent Johnson	To St. Louis Blues: Mike Sillinger	
March 9, 2004	To Phoenix Coyotes: Future considerations	To St. Louis Blues: Brian Savage	
March 9, 2004	To Phoenix Coyotes: Tom Koivisto	To St. Louis Blues: Future considerations	
March 9, 2004	To Vancouver Canucks: Sergei Varlamov	To St. Louis Blues: Ryan Ready	

=== Players acquired ===
Date	Player	Former team	Term	Via	Ref
September 5, 2003	Murray Baron	Vancouver Canucks		Free agency	
October 3, 2003	Jeff Heerema	New York Rangers		Waiver draft	
December 22, 2003	Scott Pellerin	Worcester IceCats (AHL)		Free agency	
December 30, 2003	Jeremy Yablonski	Worcester IceCats (AHL)		Free agency	
January 29, 2004	Pascal Rheaume	New York Rangers		Waivers	

=== Players lost ===
Date	Player	New team	Via (Note: In parentheses is the player's free agency group on July 1 if applicable.)	Ref
June 25, 2003	Valeri Bure	Florida Panthers	Waivers	
July 1, 2003	Steve Dubinsky (Note: Dubinsky retired.)		Contract expiration (III)	
July 1, 2003	Rich Pilon (Note: Pilon, who last played during the 2001–02 season, attended Florida Panthers training camp on a tryout but failed to make the team and retired.)		Contract expiration (III)	
July 7, 2003	Jason Dawe	Oulun Karpat (Liiga)	Free agency (UFA)	
August 28, 2003	Martin Rucinsky	New York Rangers	Free agency (III)	
September 2, 2003	Daniel Corso	Ottawa Senators	Free agency (UFA)	
September 12, 2003	Greg Davis	St. Jean Mission (QSPHL)	Free agency (UFA)	
September 22, 2003	Daniel Tkaczuk	Lukko (Liiga) (Note: Tkaczuk signed with Lukko on November 10.)	Release	
October 8, 2003	Steve Bancroft	Binghamton Senators (AHL)	Free agency	
October 21, 2003	Shjon Podein	Vaxjo Lakers (Allsvenskan)	Free agency (III)	
January 10, 2004	Jeff Heerema	New York Rangers	Waivers	
January 30, 2004	Jeremy Yablonski	Nashville Predators	Waivers	
February 24, 2004	Eric Nickulas	Chicago Blackhawks	Waivers	
April 5, 2004	Jame Pollock	Kloten Flyers (NLA)	Free agency (Note: St. Louis retained Pollock’s NHL rights through the 2004–05 season.)	
May 16, 2004	Christian Laflamme	Kassel Huskies (DEL)	Free agency	

=== Signings ===
Date	Player	Term	Contract type	Ref
June 11, 2003	Chris Osgood		Re-signing	
June 30, 2003	Aris Brimanis		Re-signing	
June 30, 2003	Reinhard Divis		Re-signing	
June 30, 2003	Jeff Panzer		Re-signing	
June 30, 2003	Sergei Varlamov		Re-signing	
July 16, 2003	Mike Danton		Re-signing	
July 16, 2003	Brent Johnson		Re-signing	
July 16, 2003	Ryan Johnson		Re-signing	
July 16, 2003	Tom Koivisto		Re-signing	
July 16, 2003	Christian Laflamme		Re-signing	
July 16, 2003	Steve Martins		Re-signing	
July 16, 2003	Bryce Salvador		Re-signing	
July 25, 2003	Reed Low		Re-signing	
July 25, 2003	Matt Walker		Re-signing	
July 31, 2003	Marc Brown		Re-signing	
July 31, 2003	Cody Rudkowsky		Re-signing	
August 7, 2003	Pavol Demitra	1-year	Arbitration award	
October 10, 2003	Trevor Byrne		Entry-level	
October 10, 2003	Colin Hemingway		Entry-level	
October 10, 2003	Aaron MacKenzie		Entry-level	

== Draft picks ==
St. Louis's draft picks at the 2003 NHL entry draft held at the Gaylord Entertainment Center in Nashville, Tennessee.

Round	#	Player	Nationality	College/Junior/Club team (League)
1	30	Shawn Belle	Canada	Tri-City Americans (WHL)
2	62	David Backes	United States	Lincoln Stars (USHL)
3	84	Konstantin Barulin	Russia	Rubin Tyumen (Russia)
3	88	Zack Fitzgerald	United States	Seattle Thunderbirds (WHL)
3	101	Konstantin Zakharov	Belarus	Yunost Minsk (Belarus)
4	127	Alexandre Bolduc	Canada	Rouyn-Noranda Huskies (QMJHL)
5	148	Lee Stempniak	United States	Dartmouth College (NCAA)
5	159	Chris Beckford-Tseu	Canada	Oshawa Generals (OHL)
6	189	Jonathan Lehun	United States	St. Cloud State University (NCAA)
7	221	Evgeny Skachkov	Russia	Kapitan Stupino Jr. (Russia)
8	253	Andrei Pervyshin	Russia	Lokomotiv Yaroslavl (Russia)
9	284	Juhamatti Aaltonen	Finland	Karpat (Finland)

== See also ==
- 2003–04 NHL season
