= 2003–04 Edmonton Oilers season =

NHL team season

2003–04 Edmonton Oilers
- Division: 4th Northwest
- Conference: 9th Western
- 2003–04 record: 36–29–12–5
- Home record: 22–12–4–3
- Road record: 14–17–8–2
- Goals for: 221
- Goals against: 208

Team information
- General manager: Kevin Lowe
- Coach: Craig MacTavish
- Captain: Jason Smith
- Alternate captains: Ethan Moreau; Ryan Smyth
- Arena: Rexall Place (Note: Renamed from Skyreach Centre in January); Commonwealth Stadium (1 game)
- Average attendance: 17,677 (105.0%)
- Minor league affiliates: Toronto Roadrunners (AHL); Columbus Cottonmouths (ECHL)

Team leaders
- Goals: Ryan Smyth (23)
- Assists: Ryan Smyth (36)
- Points: Ryan Smyth (59)
- Penalty minutes: Georges Laraque (99)
- Plus/minus: Igor Ulanov (+19)
- Wins: Ty Conklin (17); Tommy Salo (17)
- Goals against average: Ty Conklin (2.42)

The 2003–04 Edmonton Oilers season was the Oilers' 25th season in the NHL, and they were coming off a 36–26–11–9 record in 2002–03, earning 92 points, and returned to the playoffs after a one-year absence. The Oilers were then defeated by the Dallas Stars in six games in the opening round.

During the off-season, the Oilers and Mike Comrie could not come to a contract agreement, and Comrie would not start the season with the team. Comrie would eventually be traded to the Philadelphia Flyers in December for Jeff Woywitka and the Flyers' first-round draft pick in 2004.

The club would start off the season on the right foot, having a record of 10–7–2–0 in the first 19 games. However, Edmonton would go into a slump and have a 10–17–6–1 in their next 34 games, falling to 12th place in the Western Conference. The Oilers would later emerge from the slump and finish the season with a 16–5–4–4 in their remaining 29 games. Despite the season turnaround, the Oilers would finish in ninth in the West, two points behind the eighth-placed Nashville Predators for the final playoff spot, thereby failing to qualify for the post-season for the first time since the 2001–02 season and the second time in three seasons.

Offensively, Ryan Smyth would lead the club with 23 goals, 36 assists and 59 points. Radek Dvorak would finish just behind Smyth with 50 points, while Ethan Moreau and Raffi Torres would each score 20 goals. Marc-Andre Bergeron would lead the defense with 9 goals and 26 points, while Eric Brewer would finish just behind him with seven goals and 25 points. Georges Laraque would lead the club in penalty minutes, with 99.

In goal, Tommy Salo would begin the season as the starter. However, he would lose his job and eventually be traded to the Colorado Avalanche before the season was over. He won 17 games and had a 2.58 goals against average (GAA), along with three shutouts, with Edmonton. Ty Conklin took over the starting duties, where he would win 17 games, attain a 2.42 GAA and earn a shutout along the way.

== Heritage Classic ==
The Heritage Classic was an outdoor ice hockey game played on November 22, 2003, in Edmonton between the Edmonton Oilers and the Montreal Canadiens. It was the second NHL outdoor game and the first regular season outdoor game in the history of the NHL, and was modeled after the success of the "cold war" game between the University of Michigan and Michigan State University in 2001. The first NHL game to be played outdoors was in 1991 when the Los Angeles Kings played the New York Rangers in an exhibition game outside Caesars Palace in Las Vegas. The event took place in Edmonton's Commonwealth Stadium in front of a crowd of 57,167, the largest number of people to ever watch a live NHL game, despite temperatures of close to −18 °C, −30 °C (−22 °F) with wind chill. It was held to commemorate the 25th anniversary of the Edmonton Oilers joining the NHL in 1979. The Canadian Broadcasting Corporation television broadcast also set the record for most viewers of a single NHL game with 2.747 million nationwide. This was the first NHL game broadcast in HDTV on CBC. Montreal won the game 4–3.

== Season standings ==
Northwest Division
No.	CR		GP	W	L	T	OTL	GF	GA	PTS
1	3	**Vancouver Canucks**	82	43	24	10	5	235	194	101
2	4	**Colorado Avalanche**	82	40	22	13	7	235	198	100
3	6	**Calgary Flames**	82	42	30	7	3	200	176	94
4	9	Edmonton Oilers	82	36	29	12	5	221	208	89
5	10	Minnesota Wild	82	30	29	20	3	188	183	83

Note: CR = Conference rank; GP = Games played; W = Wins; L = Losses; T = Ties; OTL = Overtime loss; GF = Goals for; GA = Goals against; Pts = Points
Bolded teams qualified for the playoffs.

Western Conference
R		Div	GP	W	L	T	OTL	GF	GA	Pts
**1**	**P-** Detroit Red Wings	**CE**	**82**	**48**	**21**	**11**	**2**	**255**	**189**	109
**2**	**Y-** San Jose Sharks	**PA**	**82**	**43**	**21**	**12**	**6**	**255**	**183**	104
**3**	**Y-** Vancouver Canucks	**NW**	**82**	**43**	**24**	**10**	**5**	**235**	**194**	101
**4**	**X-** Colorado Avalanche	**NW**	**82**	**40**	**22**	**13**	**7**	**236**	**198**	100
**5**	**X-** Dallas Stars	**PA**	**82**	**41**	**26**	**13**	**2**	**194**	**175**	97
**6**	**X-** Calgary Flames	**NW**	**82**	**42**	**30**	**7**	**3**	**200**	**176**	94
**7**	**X-** St. Louis Blues	**CE**	**82**	**39**	**30**	**11**	**2**	**191**	**198**	91
**8**	**X-** Nashville Predators	**CE**	**82**	**38**	**29**	**11**	**4**	**216**	**217**	91
8.5
9	Edmonton Oilers	NW	82	36	29	12	5	221	208	89
10	Minnesota Wild	NW	82	30	29	20	3	188	183	83
11	Los Angeles Kings	PA	82	28	29	16	9	205	217	81
12	Mighty Ducks of Anaheim	PA	82	29	35	10	8	184	213	76
13	Phoenix Coyotes	PA	82	22	36	18	6	188	245	68
14	Columbus Blue Jackets	CE	82	25	45	8	4	177	238	62
15	Chicago Blackhawks	CE	82	20	43	11	8	188	259	59

Divisions: CE – Central, PA – Pacific, NW – Northwest

P – Clinched Presidents Trophy; Y – Clinched division; X – Clinched playoff spot

== Schedule and results ==
2003–04 regular season
October: 4–5–0–0 (home: 4–2–0–0; road: 0–3–0–0)

Game	Date	Visitor	Score	Home	OT	Decision	Attendance	Record	Pts	Recap
1	October 9	San Jose Sharks	2 – 5	Edmonton Oilers		Salo	16,839	1–0–0–0	2	W
2	October 11	Edmonton Oilers	0 – 3	Vancouver Canucks		Salo	18,630	1–1–0–0	2	L
3	October 14	Edmonton Oilers	0 – 1	Calgary Flames		Salo	16,009	1–2–0–0	2	L
4	October 16	Buffalo Sabres	1 – 4	Edmonton Oilers		Conklin	15,502	2–2–0–0	4	W
5	October 18	Colorado Avalanche	3 – 6	Edmonton Oilers		Salo	16,839	3–2–0–0	6	W
6	October 21	St. Louis Blues	6 – 4	Edmonton Oilers		Salo	16,043	3–3–0–0	6	L
7	October 23	Edmonton Oilers	1 – 6	Colorado Avalanche		Conklin	18,007	3–4–0–0	6	L
8	October 25	Calgary Flames	4 – 2	Edmonton Oilers		Salo	16,839	3–5–0–0	6	L
9	October 30	Columbus Blue Jackets	3 – 4	Edmonton Oilers	OT	Salo	15,946	4–5–0–0	8	W

November: 6–6–3–0 (home: 3–3–1–0; road: 3–3–2–0)

Game	Date	Visitor	Score	Home	OT	Decision	Attendance	Record	Pts	Recap
10	November 1	Detroit Red Wings	4 – 4	Edmonton Oilers	OT	Salo	16,839	4–5–1–0	9	T
11	November 4	Edmonton Oilers	4 – 2	Montreal Canadiens		Salo	18,218	5–5–1–0	11	W
12	November 6	Edmonton Oilers	3 – 3	Ottawa Senators	OT	Salo	15,216	5–5–2–0	12	T
13	November 8	Edmonton Oilers	1 – 4	Toronto Maple Leafs		Salo	19,340	5–6–2–0	12	L
14	November 10	Edmonton Oilers	5 – 4	New York Rangers		Conklin	17,887	6–6–2–0	14	W
15	November 11	Edmonton Oilers	3 – 4	Boston Bruins		Conklin	12,456	6–7–2–0	14	L
16	November 13	Edmonton Oilers	2 – 0	Minnesota Wild		Conklin	18,568	7–7–2–0	16	W
17	November 15	Calgary Flames	1 – 2	Edmonton Oilers	OT	Conklin	16,839	8–7–2–0	18	W
18	November 18	Chicago Blackhawks	2 – 5	Edmonton Oilers		Conklin	16,839	9–7–2–0	20	W
19	November 20	Toronto Maple Leafs	2 – 3	Edmonton Oilers		Conklin	16,839	10–7–2–0	22	W
20	November 22	Montreal Canadiens	4 – 3	Edmonton Oilers		Conklin	57,167	10–8–2–0	22	L
21	November 25	Edmonton Oilers	3 – 3	Columbus Blue Jackets	OT	Conklin	16,465	10–8–3–0	23	T
22	November 26	Edmonton Oilers	1 – 7	Detroit Red Wings		Conklin	20,066	10–9–3–0	23	L
23	November 28	Colorado Avalanche	4 – 1	Edmonton Oilers		Conklin	16,839	10–10–3–0	23	L
24	November 30	San Jose Sharks	2 – 1	Edmonton Oilers		Conklin	16,839	10–11–3–0	23	L

December: 3–6–4–0 (home: 1–4–2–0; road: 2–2–2–0)

Game	Date	Visitor	Score	Home	OT	Decision	Attendance	Record	Pts	Recap
25	December 3	Minnesota Wild	1 – 0	Edmonton Oilers		Conklin	16,198	10–12–3–0	23	L
26	December 6	Pittsburgh Penguins	3 – 4	Edmonton Oilers		Conklin	16,839	11–12–3–0	25	W
27	December 9	Carolina Hurricanes	3 – 2	Edmonton Oilers		Salo	16,179	11–13–3–0	25	L
28	December 11	Edmonton Oilers	2 – 2	San Jose Sharks	OT	Conklin	14,853	11–13–4–0	26	T
29	December 12	Edmonton Oilers	3 – 3	Phoenix Coyotes	OT	Salo	13,609	11–13–5–0	27	T
30	December 14	Edmonton Oilers	3 – 2	Mighty Ducks of Anaheim		Conklin	12,426	12–13–5–0	29	W
31	December 16	Edmonton Oilers	2 – 4	Los Angeles Kings		Salo	18,118	12–14–5–0	29	L
32	December 18	Minnesota Wild	1 – 1	Edmonton Oilers	OT	Conklin	16,145	12–14–6–0	30	T
33	December 20	Vancouver Canucks	3 – 0	Edmonton Oilers		Conklin	16,839	12–15–6–0	30	L
34	December 23	Edmonton Oilers	1 – 2	Calgary Flames		Salo	18,389	12–16–6–0	30	L
35	December 27	Edmonton Oilers	6 – 2	Vancouver Canucks		Salo	18,630	13–16–6–0	32	W
36	December 28	Calgary Flames	2 – 1	Edmonton Oilers		Salo	16,839	13–17–6–0	32	L
37	December 30	Minnesota Wild	2 – 2	Edmonton Oilers	OT	Salo	16,839	13–17–7–0	33	T

January: 7–7–1–1 (home: 4–3–0–0; road: 3–4–1–1)

Game	Date	Visitor	Score	Home	OT	Decision	Attendance	Record	Pts	Recap
38	January 2	Edmonton Oilers	2 – 1	Minnesota Wild		Salo	18,568	14–17–7–0	35	W
39	January 4	Edmonton Oilers	4 – 3	Chicago Blackhawks		Salo	10,101	15–17–7–0	37	W
40	January 5	Edmonton Oilers	2 – 3	New Jersey Devils	OT	Salo	11,724	15–17–7–1	38	OTL
41	January 8	Edmonton Oilers	2 – 3	New York Islanders		Conklin	11,087	15–18–7–1	38	L
42	January 10	Edmonton Oilers	3 – 0	Philadelphia Flyers		Salo	19,561	16–18–7–1	40	W
43	January 11	Edmonton Oilers	0 – 1	Washington Capitals		Salo	12,704	16–19–7–1	40	L
44	January 13	Florida Panthers	2 – 4	Edmonton Oilers		Salo	16,839	17–19–7–1	42	W
45	January 15	Mighty Ducks of Anaheim	0 – 1	Edmonton Oilers		Salo	16,839	18–19–7–1	44	W
46	January 17	Edmonton Oilers	1 – 2	Nashville Predators		Salo	15,861	18–20–7–1	44	L
47	January 18	Edmonton Oilers	4 – 4	Columbus Blue Jackets	OT	Conklin	18,136	18–20–8–1	45	T
48	January 20	Dallas Stars	0 – 3	Edmonton Oilers		Salo	16,839	19–20–8–1	47	W
49	January 22	Tampa Bay Lightning	3 – 2	Edmonton Oilers		Salo	16,839	19–21–8–1	47	L
50	January 24	Nashville Predators	4 – 3	Edmonton Oilers		Salo	16,839	19–22–8–1	47	L
51	January 27	Edmonton Oilers	1 – 3	Colorado Avalanche		Conklin	18,007	19–23–8–1	47	L
52	January 29	Chicago Blackhawks	2 – 5	Edmonton Oilers		Salo	16,839	20–23–8–1	49	W
53	January 31	Los Angeles Kings	4 – 3	Edmonton Oilers		Salo	16,839	20–24–8–1	49	L

February: 6–3–2–1 (home: 4–0–1–0; road: 2–3–1–1)

Game	Date	Visitor	Score	Home	OT	Decision	Attendance	Record	Pts	Recap
54	February 2	Mighty Ducks of Anaheim	1 – 2	Edmonton Oilers	OT	Conklin	16,183	21–24–8–1	51	W
55	February 4	St. Louis Blues	3 – 5	Edmonton Oilers		Conklin	16,569	22–24–8–1	53	W
56	February 11	Atlanta Thrashers	1 – 5	Edmonton Oilers		Conklin	16,839	23–24–8–1	55	W
57	February 13	Edmonton Oilers	0 – 3	Minnesota Wild		Conklin	18,568	23–25–8–1	55	L
58	February 15	Edmonton Oilers	2 – 2	Nashville Predators		Salo	14,276	23–25–9–1	56	T
59	February 16	Edmonton Oilers	1 – 2	Detroit Red Wings		Salo	20,066	23–26–9–1	56	L
60	February 18	Edmonton Oilers	5 – 1	Colorado Avalanche		Salo	18,007	24–26–9–1	58	W
61	February 21	Vancouver Canucks	3 – 4	Edmonton Oilers	OT	Salo	16,839	25–26–9–1	60	W
62	February 23	Detroit Red Wings	1 – 1	Edmonton Oilers	OT	Salo	16,839	25–26–10–1	61	T
63	February 25	Edmonton Oilers	2 – 4	Mighty Ducks of Anaheim		Salo	15,235	25–27–10–1	61	L
64	February 27	Edmonton Oilers	7 – 2	Phoenix Coyotes		Salo	16,721	26–27–10–1	63	W
65	February 29	Edmonton Oilers	4 – 5	Dallas Stars	OT	Salo	18,257	26–27–10–2	64	OTL

March: 10–1–2–3 (home: 6–0–0–3; road: 4–1–2–0)

Game	Date	Visitor	Score	Home	OT	Decision	Attendance	Record	Pts	Recap
66	March 2	Phoenix Coyotes	4 – 5	Edmonton Oilers	OT	Salo	16,839	27–27–10–2	66	W
67	March 4	Edmonton Oilers	1 – 1	St. Louis Blues	OT	Markkanen	16,559	27–27–11–2	67	T
68	March 7	Edmonton Oilers	4 – 3	Chicago Blackhawks	OT	Salo	12,839	28–27–11–2	69	W
69	March 9	Edmonton Oilers	1 – 1	Calgary Flames	OT	Markkanen	18,479	28–27–12–2	70	T
70	March 10	Colorado Avalanche	3 – 2	Edmonton Oilers	OT	Conklin	16,839	28–27–12–3	71	OTL
71	March 12	Vancouver Canucks	4 – 3	Edmonton Oilers	OT	Markkanen	16,839	28–27–12–4	72	OTL
72	March 14	Ottawa Senators	1 – 3	Edmonton Oilers		Conklin	16,839	29–27–12–4	74	W
73	March 16	Columbus Blue Jackets	2 – 3	Edmonton Oilers		Conklin	16,839	30–27–12–4	76	W
74	March 19	Nashville Predators	4 – 5	Edmonton Oilers		Conklin	16,839	31–27–12–4	78	W
75	March 21	Edmonton Oilers	5 – 2	San Jose Sharks		Markkanen	16,176	32–27–12–4	80	W
76	March 22	Edmonton Oilers	2 – 1	Los Angeles Kings		Conklin	18,118	33–27–12–4	82	W
77	March 24	Dallas Stars	4 – 3	Edmonton Oilers	OT	Conklin	16,839	33–27–12–5	83	OTL
78	March 26	Los Angeles Kings	1 – 3	Edmonton Oilers		Conklin	16,839	34–27–12–5	85	W
79	March 28	Phoenix Coyotes	2 – 4	Edmonton Oilers		Markkanen	16,839	35–27–12–5	87	W
80	March 30	Edmonton Oilers	0 – 1	St. Louis Blues		Markkanen	19,646	35–28–12–5	87	L
81	March 31	Edmonton Oilers	3 – 1	Dallas Stars		Markkanen	18,532	36–28–12–5	89	W

April: 0–1–0–0 (home: 0–0–0–0; road: 0–1–0–0)

Game	Date	Visitor	Score	Home	OT	Decision	Attendance	Record	Pts	Recap
82	April 3	Edmonton Oilers	2 – 5	Vancouver Canucks		Conklin	18,680	36–29–12–5	89	L

Legend: W Win (2 points) L Loss (0 points) T Tie (1 point) OTL Overtime loss (1 point)

== Player statistics ==
=== Scoring ===
- Position abbreviations: C = Centre; D = Defence; G = Goaltender; LW = Left wing; RW = Right wing
- † = Joined team via a transaction (e.g., trade, waivers, signing) during the season. Stats reflect time with the Oilers only.
- ‡ = Left team via a transaction (e.g., trade, waivers, release) during the season. Stats reflect time with the Oilers only.

No.	Player	Pos	Regular season					
No.	Player	Pos	GP	G	A	Pts	+/-	PIM
94	Ryan Smyth	LW	82	23	36	59	11	70
20	Radek Dvorak	RW	78	15	35	50	18	26
16	Mike York	C	61	16	26	42	18	15
10	Shawn Horcoff	C	80	15	25	40	0	73
14	Raffi Torres	LW	80	20	14	34	12	65
83	Ales Hemsky	RW	71	12	22	34	−7	14
18	Ethan Moreau	LW	81	20	12	32	7	96
34	Fernando Pisani	RW	76	16	14	30	14	46
24	Steve Staios	D	82	6	22	28	17	86
47	Marc-Andre Bergeron	D	54	9	17	26	13	26
2	Eric Brewer	D	77	7	18	25	−6	67
36	Jarret Stoll	C	68	10	11	21	8	42
23	Cory Cross	D	68	7	14	21	9	56
21	Jason Smith	D	68	7	12	19	13	98
15	Brad Isbister	LW	51	10	8	18	−2	54
55	Igor Ulanov†	D	42	5	13	18	19	28
77	Adam Oates†	C	60	2	16	18	0	8
27	Georges Laraque	RW	66	6	11	17	7	99
93	Petr Nedved†	C	16	5	10	15	1	4
28	Jason Chimera	LW	60	4	8	12	−1	57
19	Marty Reasoner	C	17	2	6	8	5	10
32	Scott Ferguson	D	52	1	5	6	−5	80
5	Alexei Semenov	D	46	2	3	5	8	32
12	Mike Bishai	C	14	0	2	2	0	19
33	Peter Sarno‡	C	6	1	0	1	2	2
26	Mikko Luoma	D	3	0	1	1	0	0
42	Tony Salmelainen	LW	13	0	1	1	−1	4
35	Tommy Salo‡	G	44	0	0	0		2
1	Ty Conklin	G	38	0	0	0		17
44	Doug Lynch	D	2	0	0	0	0	0
30	Jussi Markkanen†	G	7	0	0	0		2
22	Jani Rita	RW	2	0	0	0	0	0
40	Steve Valiquette‡	G	1	0	0	0		0

=== Goaltending ===
- † = Joined team via a transaction (e.g., trade, waivers, signing) during the season. Stats reflect time with the Oilers only.
- ‡ = Left team via a transaction (e.g., trade, waivers, release) during the season. Stats reflect time with the Oilers only.

No.	Player	Regular season									
No.	Player	GP	W	L	T	SA	GA	GAA	SV%	SO	TOI
1	Ty Conklin	39	17	14	4	959	84	2.42	.912	1	2085
35	Tommy Salo‡	44	17	18	6	1024	107	2.58	.896	3	2486
30	Jussi Markkanen†	7	2	2	2	182	12	1.83	.934	0	393
40	Steve Valiquette‡	1	0	0	0	7	2	9.23	.714	0	13

== Awards and records ==
=== Awards ===
Type	Award/honor	Recipient	Ref
League (in-season)	NHL Defensive Player of the Week	Ty Conklin (November 17)	
League (in-season)	NHL YoungStars Game selection	Alexei Semenov	
League (in-season)	NHL YoungStars Game selection	Raffi Torres	
Team	Community Service Award	Georges Laraque	
Team	Defenceman of the Year	Jason Smith	
Team	Molson Cup	Ryan Smyth	
Team	Most Popular Player	Ryan Smyth	
Team	Top Defensive Forward	Shawn Horcoff	
Team	Top First Year Oiler	Not awarded	
Team	Unsung Hero	Igor Ulanov	
Team	Zane Feldman Trophy	Ethan Moreau	

=== Milestones ===
Regular Season
Player	Milestone	Reached
Raffi Torres	1st NHL Goal	October 9, 2003
Eric Brewer	200th NHL PIM	October 16, 2003
Tony Salmelainen	1st NHL Game	October 30, 2003
Radek Dvorak	200th NHL Assist; 200th NHL PIM	November 1, 2003
Mike York	200th NHL Point	November 1, 2003
Tony Salmelainen	1st NHL Assist; 1st NHL Point	November 4, 2003
Peter Sarno	1st NHL Game; 1st NHL Goal; 1st NHL Point	November 4, 2003
Steve Staios	700th NHL PIM	November 4, 2003
Shawn Horcoff	200th NHL Game	November 6, 2003
Ryan Smyth	200th NHL Assist	November 10, 2003
Jarret Stoll	1st NHL Goal	November 10, 2003
Ty Conklin	1st NHL Shutout	November 13, 2003
Steve Staios	100th NHL Point	November 22, 2003
Jason Smith	700th NHL PIM	December 6, 2003
Cory Cross	600th NHL PIM	December 12, 2003
Jason Chimera	100th NHL Game	December 23, 2003
Georges Laraque	700th NHL PIM	December 30, 2003
Mikko Luoma	1st NHL Game; 1st NHL Assist; 1st NHL Point	December 30, 2003
Doug Lynch	1st NHL Game	January 2, 2004
Ryan Smyth	600th NHL Game	January 5, 2004
Ales Hemsky	100th NHL Game	January 10, 2004
Tommy Salo	200th NHL Win; 500th NHL Game	January 10, 2004
Adam Oates	1,300th NHL Game	January 13, 2004
Steve Staios	500th NHL Game	January 15, 2004
Brad Isbister	500th NHL PIM	January 17, 2004
Igor Ulanov	1,100th NHL PIM	January 22, 2004
Ryan Smyth	400th NHL Point	January 24, 2004
Mike Bishai	1st NHL Game	January 29, 2004
Eric Brewer	100th NHL Point	January 29, 2004
Mike Bishai	1st NHL Assist; 1st NHL Point	January 31, 2004
Brad Isbister	400th NHL Game	January 31, 2004
Ethan Moreau	700th NHL PIM	January 31, 2004
Scott Ferguson	200th NHL Game	February 16, 2004
Ryan Smyth	500th NHL PIM	February 23, 2004
Shawn Horcoff	100th NHL Point	February 25, 2004
Ethan Moreau	100th NHL Goal	February 27, 2004
Georges Laraque	400th NHL Game	February 29, 2004
Fernando Pisani	100th NHL Game	March 12, 2004
Raffi Torres	100th NHL Game	March 12, 2004
Jason Smith	700th NHL Game	March 14, 2004
Cory Cross	600th NHL Game	March 21, 2004
Eric Brewer	400th NHL Game	March 26, 2004
Ethan Moreau	600th NHL Game	March 26, 2004
Petr Nedved	300th NHL Goal	March 26, 2004
Igor Ulanov	700th NHL Game	March 30, 2004

== Transactions ==
The Oilers were involved in the following transactions from June 10, 2003, the day after the deciding game of the 2003 Stanley Cup Finals, through June 7, 2004, the day of the deciding game of the 2004 Stanley Cup Finals.

=== Trades ===
Date	Details		Ref
June 21, 2003	To New Jersey Devils: 1st-round pick in 2003	To Edmonton Oilers: 1st-round pick in 2003; 2nd-round pick in 2003	
June 30, 2003	To New York Rangers: Jussi Markkanen; Conditional draft pick (Note: 4th-round pick in 2004)	To Edmonton Oilers: Rights to Brian Leetch	
December 16, 2003	To Philadelphia Flyers: Rights to Mike Comrie	To Edmonton Oilers: Jeff Woywitka; 1st-round pick in 2004; 3rd-round pick in 2005	
February 16, 2004	To Vancouver Canucks: Peter Sarno	To Edmonton Oilers: Tyler Moss	
March 3, 2004	To New York Rangers: Steve Valiquette; Rights to Dwight Helminen; 2nd-round pick in 2004	To Edmonton Oilers: Jussi Markkanen; Petr Nedved	
March 9, 2004	To Colorado Avalanche: Tommy Salo; 6th-round pick in 2005	To Edmonton Oilers: Rights to Tom Gilbert	

=== Players acquired ===
Date	Player	Former team	Term	Via	Ref
July 15, 2003	Rocky Thompson	Florida Panthers	2-year	Free agency	
July 15, 2003	Steve Valiquette	New York Islanders	1-year	Free agency	
August 21, 2003	Dan Smith	Springfield Falcons (AHL)	1-year	Free agency	
September 2, 2003	Jamie Wright	Philadelphia Flyers	2-year	Free agency	
October 8, 2003	Steve Valiquette	Florida Panthers		Waivers	
November 17, 2003	Adam Oates	Anaheim Mighty Ducks	1-year	Free agency	
January 5, 2004	Igor Ulanov	Florida Panthers	1-year	Free agency	

=== Players lost ===
Date	Player	New team	Via (Note: In parentheses is the player's free agency group on July 1 if applicable.)	Ref
June 30, 2003	Daniel Cleary	Phoenix Coyotes (Note: Cleary signed with Phoenix on July 15.)	Buyout	
July 3, 2003	Todd Marchant	Columbus Blue Jackets	Free agency (V)	
July 24, 2003	Brian Swanson	Atlanta Thrashers	Free agency (VI)	
July 28, 2003	Kari Haakana	Modo Hockey (SHL)	Free agency (II) (Note: Edmonton retained Haakana’s NHL rights through the 2005–06 season.)	
July 30, 2003	Brian Leetch	New York Rangers	Free agency (III)	
October 3, 2003	Steve Valiquette	Florida Panthers	Waiver draft	
April 3, 2004	Adam Oates		Retirement	

=== Signings ===
Date	Player	Term	Contract type	Ref
June 30, 2003	Cory Cross	3-year	Re-signing	
July 3, 2003	Jan Horacek	1-year	Re-signing	
July 3, 2003	Mikko Luoma	1-year	Entry-level	
July 3, 2003	Mathieu Roy	3-year	Entry-level	
July 28, 2003	Chad Hinz	1-year	Re-signing	
July 28, 2003	Jason Smith	1-year	Re-signing	
July 29, 2003	Brad Isbister	1-year	Re-signing	
August 1, 2003	Marty Reasoner	2-year	Re-signing	
August 1, 2003	Raffi Torres	2-year	Re-signing	
August 5, 2003	Bobby Allen	1-year	Re-signing	
August 5, 2003	Michael Henrich	1-year	Re-signing	
August 5, 2003	Shawn Horcoff	2-year	Re-signing	
August 14, 2003	Ryan Smyth	2-year	Re-signing	
August 21, 2003	Fernando Pisani	3-year	Re-signing	
September 2, 2003	Peter Sarno	2-year	Re-signing	
September 11, 2003	Joe Cullen	2-year	Entry-level	
September 11, 2003	Georges Laraque	3-year	Re-signing	
September 11, 2003	Ethan Moreau	1-year	Re-signing	
September 11, 2003	Brad Winchester	2-year	Entry-level	
September 29, 2003	Ethan Moreau	4-year	Re-signing	
November 19, 2003	Steve Staios	3-year	Extension	
May 31, 2004	Jeff Deslauriers	3-year	Entry-level	

== Draft picks ==
Edmonton's draft picks at the 2003 NHL entry draft held at the Gaylord Entertainment Center in Nashville, Tennessee.

Round	#	Player	Nationality	College/junior/club team (league)
1	22	Marc-Antoine Pouliot	Canada	Rimouski Oceanic (QMJHL)
2	51	Colin McDonald	United States	New England Jr. Coyotes (EJHL)
2	68	Jean-François Jacques	Canada	Baie-Comeau Drakkar (QMJHL)
3	72	Mikhail Zhukov	Russia	Arboga (Sweden)
3	94	Zack Stortini	Canada	Sudbury Wolves (OHL)
5	147	Kalle Olsson	Sweden	Frolunda HC (Elitserien)
5	154	David Rohlfs	United States	Detroit Compuware Ambassadors (NAHL)
6	184	Dragan Umicevic	Sweden	Sodertalje SK (SEL)
7	214	Kyle Brodziak	Canada	Moose Jaw Warriors (WHL)
7	215	Mathieu Roy	Canada	Val-d'Or Foreurs (QMJHL)
8	248	Josef Hrabal	Czech Republic	HC Vsetin (Czech Extraliga)
9	278	Troy Bodie	Canada	Kelowna Rockets (WHL)
