= 2003–04 Vancouver Canucks season =

NHL hockey team season

2003–04 Vancouver Canucks
- Northwest Division champions
- Division: 1st Northwest
- Conference: 3rd Western
- 2003–04 record: 43–24–10–5
- Home record: 21–13–7–0
- Road record: 22–11–3–5
- Goals for: 235
- Goals against: 194

Team information
- General manager: Brian Burke
- Coach: Marc Crawford
- Captain: Markus Naslund
- Alternate captains: Todd Bertuzzi; Ed Jovanovski; Trevor Linden; Brendan Morrison
- Arena: General Motors Place
- Average attendance: 18,630
- Minor league affiliates: Manitoba Moose; Columbia Inferno

Team leaders
- Goals: Markus Naslund (35)
- Assists: Markus Naslund (49)
- Points: Markus Naslund (84)
- Penalty minutes: Brad May (137)
- Plus/minus: Marek Malik (+35)
- Wins: Dan Cloutier (33)
- Goals against average: Dan Cloutier (2.27)

The 2003–04 Vancouver Canucks season was the Canucks' 34th NHL season. It was the first time since the Northwest Division was created that a team other than the Colorado Avalanche won the division title.

== Regular season ==
The Canucks began their season with the top line of Brendan Morrison, Markus Naslund and Todd Bertuzzi. The Sedin twins continued to develop and began seeing some success initially being paired with Jason King. With their initial team chemistry, Jason King plotting 12 goals and being named NHL Rookie of the Month in November. The trio briefly formed "The Mattress Line" (Two Twins and a King). The season looked promising with the Canucks being near the top of the standings. When February came along, the Canucks narrowly defeated the Colorado Avalanche 1-0 but it came at a cost with Avalanche forward Steve Moore hitting Canucks captain Markus Naslund resulting in Naslund getting a concussion and Moore not penalized. Many Canucks vowed revenge against Moore (notably Brad May). When the two teams met again in Denver on March 3 (with NHL Commissioner Gary Bettman in attendance), there were no incidents and both teams skated to a 5–5 draw. On March 8, however, in Vancouver, everything fell apart. The Avalanche jumped out to a 5–0 lead and Brad May cut the deficit to 5-2 while at the same time taunting Avalanche goalie David Aebischer after each goal. Bertuzzi made it his personal mission to go after Steve Moore and after trying (and failing) to incite him, sucker punched him and falling on top of him. Bertuzzi would be suspended the rest of the regular season and playoffs. The Canucks had some difficulty recovering from this incident and managed to win the Northwest Division on the final day of the regular season, their first division championship since the 1992–93 season.

=== Final standings ===
Northwest Division
No.	CR		GP	W	L	T	OTL	GF	GA	PTS
1	3	**Vancouver Canucks**	82	43	24	10	5	235	194	101
2	4	**Colorado Avalanche**	82	40	22	13	7	235	198	100
3	6	**Calgary Flames**	82	42	30	7	3	200	176	94
4	9	Edmonton Oilers	82	36	29	12	5	221	208	89
5	10	Minnesota Wild	82	30	29	20	3	188	183	83

Note: CR = Conference rank; GP = Games played; W = Wins; L = Losses; T = Ties; OTL = Overtime loss; GF = Goals for; GA = Goals against; Pts = Points
Bolded teams qualified for the playoffs.

Western Conference
R		Div	GP	W	L	T	OTL	GF	GA	Pts
**1**	**P-** Detroit Red Wings	**CE**	**82**	**48**	**21**	**11**	**2**	**255**	**189**	109
**2**	**Y-** San Jose Sharks	**PA**	**82**	**43**	**21**	**12**	**6**	**255**	**183**	104
**3**	**Y-** Vancouver Canucks	**NW**	**82**	**43**	**24**	**10**	**5**	**235**	**194**	101
**4**	**X-** Colorado Avalanche	**NW**	**82**	**40**	**22**	**13**	**7**	**236**	**198**	100
**5**	**X-** Dallas Stars	**PA**	**82**	**41**	**26**	**13**	**2**	**194**	**175**	97
**6**	**X-** Calgary Flames	**NW**	**82**	**42**	**30**	**7**	**3**	**200**	**176**	94
**7**	**X-** St. Louis Blues	**CE**	**82**	**39**	**30**	**11**	**2**	**191**	**198**	91
**8**	**X-** Nashville Predators	**CE**	**82**	**38**	**29**	**11**	**4**	**216**	**217**	91
8.5
9	Edmonton Oilers	NW	82	36	29	12	5	221	208	89
10	Minnesota Wild	NW	82	30	29	20	3	188	183	83
11	Los Angeles Kings	PA	82	28	29	16	9	205	217	81
12	Mighty Ducks of Anaheim	PA	82	29	35	10	8	184	213	76
13	Phoenix Coyotes	PA	82	22	36	18	6	188	245	68
14	Columbus Blue Jackets	CE	82	25	45	8	4	177	238	62
15	Chicago Blackhawks	CE	82	20	43	11	8	188	259	59

Divisions: CE – Central, PA – Pacific, NW – Northwest

P – Clinched Presidents Trophy; Y – Clinched division; X – Clinched playoff spot

== Playoffs ==
=== Western Conference Quarterfinals vs. (6) Calgary Flames ===
After splitting the first two games in Vancouver, Dan Cloutier was injured midway through Game 3 in Calgary. With backup Johan Hedberg playing in relief, Vancouver would also split Games 3 and 4 in Calgary. Alex Auld took over in goal starting in Game 5, which the Canucks lost 2–1. Facing elimination in Game 6, Brendan Morrison scored the winner in the third overtime period to force a Game 7 in Vancouver. In the series-deciding game, the Canucks found themselves down a goal and on the penalty kill in the last minute. With Auld on the bench for the extra attacker, winger Matt Cooke tied the game with 5.7 seconds left to force overtime. However, with Ed Jovanovski still in the penalty box, former Canuck Martin Gelinas eliminated the Canucks on the power play.

== Schedule and results ==
=== Regular season ===
2003–04 regular season
October: 7–2–2–0 (home: 5–0–1–0; road: 2–2–1–0)

Game	Date	Score	Opponent	Record	Recap
1	October 9, 2003	4–1	Calgary Flames (2003–04)	1–0–0–0	W
2	October 11, 2003	3–0	Edmonton Oilers (2003–04)	2–0–0–0	W
3	October 13, 2003	2–3	@ Columbus Blue Jackets (2003–04)	2–1–0–0	L
4	October 16, 2003	2–3	@ Detroit Red Wings (2003–04)	2–2–0–0	L
5	October 18, 2003	2–2 OT	@ Minnesota Wild (2003–04)	2–2–1–0	T
6	October 20, 2003	6–1	Buffalo Sabres (2003–04)	3–2–1–0	W
7	October 22, 2003	3–2	St. Louis Blues (2003–04)	4–2–1–0	W
8	October 26, 2003	3–3 OT	Phoenix Coyotes (2003–04)	4–2–2–0	T
9	October 28, 2003	6–3	Columbus Blue Jackets (2003–04)	5–2–2–0	W
10	October 30, 2003	3–1	@ Los Angeles Kings (2003–04)	6–2–2–0	W
11	October 31, 2003	4–1	@ Phoenix Coyotes (2003–04)	7–2–2–0	W

November: 7–4–1–2 (home: 4–1–0–0; road: 3–3–1–2)

Game	Date	Score	Opponent	Record	Recap
12	November 3, 2003	5–1	Detroit Red Wings (2003–04)	8–2–2–0	W
13	November 5, 2003	4–3	@ Nashville Predators (2003–04)	9–2–2–0	W
14	November 6, 2003	2–3	@ St. Louis Blues (2003–04)	9–3–2–0	L
15	November 8, 2003	4–3	Minnesota Wild (2003–04)	10–3–2–0	W
16	November 11, 2003	0–1	@ Minnesota Wild (2003–04)	10–4–2–0	L
17	November 13, 2003	3–4 OT	@ Philadelphia Flyers (2003–04)	10–4–2–1	OTL
18	November 15, 2003	1–2 OT	@ Boston Bruins (2003–04)	10–4–2–2	OTL
19	November 18, 2003	5–4 OT	Montreal Canadiens (2003–04)	11–4–2–2	W
20	November 20, 2003	3–2 OT	Chicago Blackhawks (2003–04)	12–4–2–2	W
21	November 22, 2003	3–5	Toronto Maple Leafs (2003–04)	12–5–2–2	L
22	November 24, 2003	1–2	@ Toronto Maple Leafs (2003–04)	12–6–2–2	L
23	November 25, 2003	5–2	@ Montreal Canadiens (2003–04)	13–6–2–2	W
24	November 27, 2003	3–2 OT	@ Ottawa Senators (2003–04)	14–6–2–2	W
25	November 29, 2003	4–4 OT	@ Calgary Flames (2003–04)	14–6–3–2	T

December: 7–3–3–0 (home: 2–2–3–0; road: 5–1–0–0)

Game	Date	Score	Opponent	Record	Recap
26	December 4, 2003	1–4	Calgary Flames (2003–04)	14–7–3–2	L
27	December 6, 2003	1–1 OT	Minnesota Wild (2003–04)	14–7–4–2	T
28	December 9, 2003	4–3 OT	Pittsburgh Penguins (2003–04)	15–7–4–2	W
29	December 11, 2003	1–1 OT	Colorado Avalanche (2003–04)	15–7–5–2	T
30	December 14, 2003	2–1 OT	Carolina Hurricanes (2003–04)	16–7–5–2	W
31	December 16, 2003	2–1 OT	@ Nashville Predators (2003–04)	17–7–5–2	W
32	December 17, 2003	1–3	@ Dallas Stars (2003–04)	17–8–5–2	L
33	December 20, 2003	3–0	@ Edmonton Oilers (2003–04)	18–8–5–2	W
34	December 22, 2003	4–4 OT	Los Angeles Kings (2003–04)	18–8–6–2	T
35	December 26, 2003	2–0	@ Calgary Flames (2003–04)	19–8–6–2	W
36	December 27, 2003	2–6	Edmonton Oilers (2003–04)	19–9–6–2	L
37	December 29, 2003	3–2	@ Colorado Avalanche (2003–04)	20–9–6–2	W
38	December 31, 2003	4–3 OT	@ Chicago Blackhawks (2003–04)	21–9–6–2	W

January: 9–5–1–0 (home: 3–4–1–0; road: 6–1–0–0)

Game	Date	Score	Opponent	Record	Recap
39	January 2, 2004	2–4	Colorado Avalanche (2003–04)	21–10–6–2	L
40	January 3, 2004	3–1	@ Calgary Flames (2003–04)	22–10–6–2	W
41	January 5, 2004	1–2	San Jose Sharks (2003–04)	22–11–6–2	L
42	January 8, 2004	3–1	@ Los Angeles Kings (2003–04)	23–11–6–2	W
43	January 9, 2004	5–2	@ Mighty Ducks of Anaheim (2003–04)	24–11–6–2	W
44	January 11, 2004	2–2 OT	Florida Panthers (2003–04)	24–11–7–2	T
45	January 13, 2004	4–1	@ Phoenix Coyotes (2003–04)	25–11–7–2	W
46	January 15, 2004	1–3	@ San Jose Sharks (2003–04)	25–12–7–2	L
47	January 17, 2004	1–2	Mighty Ducks of Anaheim (2003–04)	25–13–7–2	L
48	January 19, 2004	2–3	Dallas Stars (2003–04)	25–14–7–2	L
49	January 21, 2004	5–4 OT	Tampa Bay Lightning (2003–04)	26–14–7–2	W
50	January 25, 2004	4–1	Nashville Predators (2003–04)	27–14–7–2	W
51	January 27, 2004	3–2	Chicago Blackhawks (2003–04)	28–14–7–2	W
52	January 29, 2004	4–2	@ St. Louis Blues (2003–04)	29–14–7–2	W
53	January 31, 2004	6–1	@ Washington Capitals (2003–04)	30–14–7–2	W

February: 5–5–0–2 (home: 3–3–0–0; road: 2–2–0–2)

Game	Date	Score	Opponent	Record	Recap
54	February 2, 2004	3–4	@ New York Rangers (2003–04)	30–15–7–2	L
55	February 3, 2004	4–5 OT	@ New York Islanders (2003–04)	30–15–7–3	OTL
56	February 5, 2004	4–0	@ New Jersey Devils (2003–04)	31–15–7–3	W
57	February 11, 2004	2–3	Calgary Flames (2003–04)	31–16–7–3	L
58	February 13, 2004	1–4	Atlanta Thrashers (2003–04)	31–17–7–3	L
59	February 14, 2004	1–2	Mighty Ducks of Anaheim (2003–04)	31–18–7–3	L
60	February 16, 2004	1–0	@ Colorado Avalanche (2003–04)	32–18–7–3	W
61	February 19, 2004	2–6	@ Minnesota Wild (2003–04)	32–19–7–3	L
62	February 21, 2004	3–4 OT	@ Edmonton Oilers (2003–04)	32–19–7–4	OTL
63	February 24, 2004	4–2	Detroit Red Wings (2003–04)	33–19–7–4	W
64	February 26, 2004	3–2 OT	San Jose Sharks (2003–04)	34–19–7–4	W
65	February 28, 2004	2–0	St. Louis Blues (2003–04)	35–19–7–4	W

March: 6–5–3–1 (home: 3–3–2–0; road: 3–2–1–1)

Game	Date	Score	Opponent	Record	Recap
66	March 3, 2004	5–5 OT	@ Colorado Avalanche (2003–04)	35–19–8–4	T
67	March 5, 2004	1–3	@ Detroit Red Wings (2003–04)	35–20–8–4	L
68	March 6, 2004	4–0	@ Columbus Blue Jackets (2003–04)	36–20–8–4	W
69	March 8, 2004	2–9	Colorado Avalanche (2003–04)	36–21–8–4	L
70	March 10, 2004	1–1 OT	Minnesota Wild (2003–04)	36–21–9–4	T
71	March 12, 2004	4–3 OT	@ Edmonton Oilers (2003–04)	37–21–9–4	W
72	March 13, 2004	1–2	Ottawa Senators (2003–04)	37–22–9–4	L
73	March 16, 2004	2–2 OT	Nashville Predators (2003–04)	37–22–10–4	T
74	March 18, 2004	0–3	@ Dallas Stars (2003–04)	37–23–10–4	L
75	March 19, 2004	3–4 OT	@ Chicago Blackhawks (2003–04)	37–23–10–5	OTL
76	March 21, 2004	4–5	Columbus Blue Jackets (2003–04)	37–24–10–5	L
77	March 24, 2004	1–0	Los Angeles Kings (2003–04)	38–24–10–5	W
78	March 27, 2004	3–2 OT	Dallas Stars (2003–04)	39–24–10–5	W
79	March 29, 2004	6–1	Phoenix Coyotes (2003–04)	40–24–10–5	W
80	March 31, 2004	2–1	@ Mighty Ducks of Anaheim (2003–04)	41–24–10–5	W

April: 2–0–0–0 (home: 1–0–0–0; road: 1–0–0–0)

Game	Date	Score	Opponent	Record	Recap
81	April 2, 2004	4–1	@ San Jose Sharks (2003–04)	42–24–10–5	W
82	April 3, 2004	5–2	Edmonton Oilers (2003–04)	43–24–10–5	W

Legend: W Win (2 points) L Loss (0 points) T Tie (1 point) OTL Overtime loss (1 point)

=== Playoffs ===
2004 Stanley Cup playoffs
Western Conference Quarterfinals vs. (6) Calgary Flames: Calgary won 4–3

Game	Date	Visitor	Score	Home	OT	Decision	Attendance	Series	Recap
1	April 7	Calgary	3–5	Vancouver		Cloutier	18,630	Canucks lead 1–0	W
2	April 9	Calgary	2–1	Vancouver		Kiprusoff	18,630	Series tied 1–1	L
3	April 11	Vancouver	2–1	Calgary		Hedberg	19,289	Canucks lead 2–1	W
4	April 13	Vancouver	0–4	Calgary		Kiprusoff	19,289	Series tied 2–2	L
5	April 15	Calgary	2–1	Vancouver		Kiprusoff	18,630	Flames lead 3–2	L
6	April 17	Vancouver	5–4	Calgary	3OT	Auld	19,289	Series tied 3–3	W
7	April 19	Calgary	3–2	Vancouver	OT	Kiprusoff	18,630	Flames win 4–3	L

Legend: W Win L Loss

== Player statistics ==
=== Scoring ===
- Position abbreviations: C = Centre; D = Defence; G = Goaltender; LW = Left wing; RW = Right wing
- † = Joined team via a transaction (e.g., trade, waivers, signing) during the season. Stats reflect time with the Canucks only.
- ‡ = Left team via a transaction (e.g., trade, waivers, release) during the season. Stats reflect time with the Canucks only.

No.	Player	Pos	Regular season						Playoffs					
No.	Player	Pos	GP	G	A	Pts	+/-	PIM	GP	G	A	Pts	+/-	PIM
19	Markus Naslund	LW	78	35	49	84	24	58	7	2	7	9	1	2
7	Brendan Morrison	C	82	22	38	60	16	50	7	2	3	5	2	8
44	Todd Bertuzzi	RW	69	17	43	60	21	122	—	—	—	—	—	—
22	Daniel Sedin	LW	82	18	36	54	18	18	7	1	2	3	0	0
33	Henrik Sedin	C	76	11	31	42	23	32	7	2	2	4	0	2
3	Brent Sopel	D	80	10	32	42	11	36	7	0	1	1	−4	0
16	Trevor Linden	C	82	14	22	36	−6	26	7	0	0	0	−3	6
2	Mattias Ohlund	D	82	14	20	34	14	73	7	1	4	5	−6	13
6	Sami Salo	D	74	7	19	26	8	22	7	1	2	3	−3	2
24	Matt Cooke	LW	53	11	12	23	5	73	7	3	1	4	3	12
55	Ed Jovanovski	D	56	7	16	23	2	64	7	0	4	4	2	6
17	Jason King	RW	47	12	9	21	0	8	1	0	0	0	0	0
13	Artem Chubarov	C	65	12	7	19	1	14	7	0	1	1	−3	0
8	Marek Malik	D	78	3	16	19	35	45	7	0	0	0	1	10
9	Mike Keane	RW	64	8	9	17	7	20	7	0	0	0	−3	4
21	Magnus Arvedson	C	41	8	7	15	7	12	—	—	—	—	—	—
37	Jarkko Ruutu	RW	71	6	8	14	−13	133	6	1	0	1	−3	10
10	Brad May	LW	70	5	6	11	−2	137	6	1	0	1	−3	6
14	Geoff Sanderson†	LW	13	3	4	7	−1	4	7	1	1	2	−1	4
5	Bryan Allen	D	74	2	5	7	−10	94	4	0	0	0	0	2
71	Jiri Slegr‡	D	16	2	5	7	6	8	—	—	—	—	—	—
20	Ryan Kesler	C	28	2	3	5	−2	16	—	—	—	—	—	—
32	Tyler Bouck	C	18	1	2	3	−4	23	1	0	0	0	−1	0
26	Martin Rucinsky†	LW	13	1	2	3	2	10	7	1	1	2	−3	6
4	Nolan Baumgartner†	D	9	0	3	3	3	2	—	—	—	—	—	—
28	Wade Brookbank†	D	20	2	0	2	3	95	—	—	—	—	—	—
23	Marc Bergevin†	D	9	0	2	2	2	2	3	0	0	0	0	2
23	Martin Grenier‡	D	7	1	0	1	3	9	—	—	—	—	—	—
15	Pat Kavanagh	RW	3	1	0	1	0	0	—	—	—	—	—	—
39	Dan Cloutier	G	60	0	1	1		22	3	0	0	0		2
18	Fedor Fedorov	C	8	0	1	1	0	4	—	—	—	—	—	—
15	Sean Pronger†	C	3	0	1	1	−1	4	—	—	—	—	—	—
14	Brandon Reid	C	3	0	1	1	1	0	—	—	—	—	—	—
35	Alex Auld	G	6	0	0	0		0	3	0	0	0		0
1	Johan Hedberg	G	21	0	0	0		10	2	0	0	0		0
29	Nathan Smith	C	2	0	0	0	−1	0	—	—	—	—	—	—

=== Goaltending ===
No.	Player	Regular season										Playoffs								
No.	Player	GP	W	L	T	SA	GA	GAA	SV%	SO	TOI	GP	W	L	SA	GA	GAA	SV%	SO	TOI
39	Dan Cloutier	60	33	21	2	1554	134	2.27	.914	5	3539	3	1	1	64	5	2.17	.922	0	138
1	Johan Hedberg	21	8	6	2	459	46	2.51	.900	3	1098	2	1	1	51	4	2.45	.922	0	98
35	Alex Auld	6	2	2	1	168	12	2.06	.929	0	349	3	1	2	88	9	2.43	.898	0	222

== Awards and records ==
=== Awards ===
Type	Award/honor	Recipient	Ref
League (annual)	NHL First All-Star Team	Markus Naslund (Left wing)	
League (annual)	NHL Plus-Minus Award	Marek Malik (Note: Shared with Martin St. Louis of the Tampa Bay Lightning.)	
League (in-season)	NHL All-Star Game selection	Todd Bertuzzi (Note: Bertuzzi was voted to the starting lineup.)	
League (in-season)	NHL All-Star Game selection	Marc Crawford (coach)	
League (in-season)	NHL All-Star Game selection	Markus Naslund	
League (in-season)	NHL Offensive Player of the Week	Markus Naslund (November 10)	
League (in-season)	NHL Offensive Player of the Week	Markus Naslund (December 1)	
League (in-season)	NHL Rookie of the Month	Jason King (November)	
Team	Babe Pratt Trophy	Mattias Ohlund	
Team	Cyclone Taylor Trophy	Markus Naslund	
Team	Cyrus H. McLean Trophy	Markus Naslund	
Team	Fred J. Hume Award	Brent Sopel	
Team	Molson Cup	Dan Cloutier	
Team	Most Exciting Player Award	Todd Bertuzzi	

=== Milestones ===
Milestone	Player	Date	Ref
First game	Nathan Smith	November 18, 2003	
First game	Ryan Kesler	November 24, 2003	

== Transactions ==
The Canucks were involved in the following transactions from June 10, 2003, the day after the deciding game of the 2003 Stanley Cup Finals, through June 7, 2004, the day of the deciding game of the 2004 Stanley Cup Finals.

=== Trades ===
Date	Details		Ref
July 25, 2003	To Vancouver Canucks: Martin Grenier	To Phoenix Coyotes: Bryan Helmer	
August 25, 2003	To Vancouver Canucks: Johan Hedberg	To Pittsburgh Penguins: 2nd-round pick in 2004	
October 30, 2003	To Vancouver Canucks: Sean Pronger	To Columbus Blue Jackets: Zenith Komarniski	
December 17, 2003	To Vancouver Canucks: Wade Brookbank	To Nashville Predators: Future considerations	
January 17, 2004	To Vancouver Canucks: Future considerations	To Boston Bruins: Jiri Slegr	
February 16, 2004	To Vancouver Canucks: Peter Sarno	To Edmonton Oilers: Tyler Moss	
March 9, 2004	To Vancouver Canucks: Martin Rucinsky	To New York Rangers: Martin Grenier; Rights to R. J. Umberger	
March 9, 2004	To Vancouver Canucks: Geoff Sanderson	To Columbus Blue Jackets: 3rd-round pick in 2004	
March 9, 2004	To Vancouver Canucks: Marc Bergevin	To Pittsburgh Penguins: 7th-round pick in 2004	
March 9, 2004	To Vancouver Canucks: Sylvain Blouin	To Montreal Canadiens: Rene Vydareny	
March 9, 2004	To Vancouver Canucks: Sergei Varlamov	To St. Louis Blues: Ryan Ready	

=== Players acquired ===
Date	Player	Former team	Term	Via	Ref
July 30, 2003	Jesse Schultz	Kelowna Rockets (WHL)		Free agency	
August 6, 2003	Dallas Eakins	Atlanta Thrashers		Free agency	
September 4, 2003	Jiri Slegr	Detroit Red Wings		Free agency	
September 10, 2003	Magnus Arvedson	Ottawa Senators		Free agency	
October 8, 2003	Mike Keane	Colorado Avalanche	1-year	Free agency	
November 1, 2003	Nolan Baumgartner	Pittsburgh Penguins		Waivers	
December 31, 2003	Wade Brookbank	Florida Panthers		Waivers	

=== Players lost ===
Date	Player	New team	Via (Note: In parentheses is the player's free agency group on July 1 if applicable.)	Ref
June 11, 2003	Herberts Vasiljevs	Amur Khabarovsk (RSL)	Free agency (VI)	
June 13, 2003	Chris Herperger	Krefeld Pinguine (DEL)	Free agency (UFA)	
July 3, 2003	Trevor Letowski	Columbus Blue Jackets	Free agency (UFA)	
July 7, 2003	Trent Klatt	Los Angeles Kings	Free agency (III)	
August 25, 2003	Justin Kurtz	Krefeld Pinguine (DEL)	Free agency (II) (Note: Vancouver retained Kurtz’s NHL rights through the 2005–06 season.)	
August 27, 2003	John Craighead	Nottingham Panthers (EIHL)	Free agency (UFA)	
September 5, 2003	Murray Baron	St. Louis Blues	Free agency (III)	
September 10, 2003	Regan Darby	Utah Grizzlies (AHL)	Free agency (UFA)	
N/A	Denis Martynyuk	HC Rybinsk (RUS-2)	Free agency (UFA)	
October 3, 2003	Nolan Baumgartner	Pittsburgh Penguins	Waiver draft	
October 3, 2003	Darren Langdon	Montreal Canadiens	Waiver draft	
October 15, 2003	Darrell Hay	Idaho Steelheads (ECHL)	Free agency (UFA)	
December 19, 2003	Wade Brookbank	Ottawa Senators	Waivers	
April 17, 2004	Mikko Jokela	HPK (Liiga)	Free agency (Note: Vancouver retained Jokela’s NHL rights through the 2007–08 season.)	
April 26, 2004	Jaroslav Obsut	Lulea HF (SHL)	Free agency	
May 26, 2004	Dallas Eakins		Retirement	
June 2, 2004	Sean Pronger	Frankfurt Lions (DEL)	Free agency	

=== Signings ===
Date	Player	Term	Contract type	Ref
July 3, 2003	Jarkko Ruutu		Re-signing	
July 11, 2003	Brad May	2-year	Re-signing	
July 14, 2003	Kirill Koltsov		Entry-level	
July 15, 2003	Dan Cloutier	1-year	Re-signing	
July 15, 2003	Marek Malik	2-year	Re-signing	
July 17, 2003	Mats Lindgren		Re-signing	
July 17, 2003	Sami Salo	2-year	Re-signing	
July 28, 2003	Daniel Sedin		Re-signing	
July 28, 2003	Henrik Sedin		Re-signing	
July 30, 2003	Nolan Baumgartner		Re-signing	
August 1, 2003	Bryan Allen		Re-signing	
August 1, 2003	Artem Chubarov		Re-signing	
August 18, 2003	Ryan Kesler		Entry-level	
September 10, 2003	Tyler Moss		Re-signing	
September 26, 2003	Tyler Bouck		Re-signing	
September 26, 2003	Pat Kavanagh		Re-signing	
September 26, 2003	Zenith Komarniski		Re-signing	
September 26, 2003	Chris Nielsen		Re-signing	
October 26, 2003	Todd Bertuzzi	4-year	New contract	

== Draft picks ==
Vancouver's draft picks at the 2003 NHL entry draft held at the Gaylord Entertainment Center in Nashville, Tennessee.

Round	#	Player	Pos	Nationality	College/Junior/Club team (League)
1	23	Ryan Kesler	C	United States	Ohio State University (NCAA)
2	60	Marc-Andre Bernier	RW	Canada	Halifax Mooseheads (QMJHL)
4	111	Brandon Nolan	LW	Canada	Oshawa Generals (OHL)
4	128	Ty Morris	LW	Canada	St. Albert (AJHL)
5	150	Nicklas Danielsson	RW	Sweden	Brynäs IF (SWE)
6	190	Chad Brownlee	D	Canada	Vernon Vipers (BCHL)
7	222	Francois-Pierre Guenette	C	Canada	Halifax Mooseheads (QMJHL)
8	252	Sergei Topol	F	Russia	OMSK (RUS)
8	254	Nathan McIver	D	Canada	Toronto St. Michael's Majors (OHL)
9	285	Matthew Hansen	D	Canada	Seattle Thunderbirds (WHL)

== See also ==
- 2003–04 NHL season
