= Peter Sarno =

Canadian ice hockey player

- Born: July 26, 1979 (age 46) Toronto, Ontario, Canada
- Height: 5 ft 11 in (180 cm)
- Weight: 185 lb (84 kg; 13 st 3 lb)
- Position: Centre
- Shot: Left
- Played for: Edmonton Oilers; Columbus Blue Jackets
- NHL draft: 141st overall, 1997; Edmonton Oilers
- Playing career: 1998–2011

Peter Sarno (born July 26, 1979) is a Canadian former professional ice hockey centre, who last played for Alleghe Hockey in the Italian Serie A. He was selected in the sixth round of the 1997 NHL entry draft, 141st overall, by the Edmonton Oilers.

== Playing career ==
As a youth, Sarno played in the 1993 Quebec International Pee-Wee Hockey Tournament with the Toronto Marlboros minor ice hockey team.

After completing a successful junior career with the Windsor Spitfires and the Sarnia Sting of the OHL, in which he twice led the league in points, Sarno apprenticed in the Oilers farm system, playing for their AHL team, the Hamilton Bulldogs. After one season in Finland, Sarno returned to North America, where he played for the Oilers new AHL franchise, the Toronto Roadrunners. He also made his NHL debut, playing six games with the big club. Shortly thereafter, he was dealt to the Vancouver Canucks, who wanted more depth at their centre position. He played one and a half seasons for their AHL affiliate, the Manitoba Moose, before signing on with the Syracuse Crunch (affiliated with the Columbus Blue Jackets).

Sarno then moved to Europe, signing with HC Fribourg-Gottéron in the Nationalliga A in Switzerland in 2006, followed by three seasons in the Deutsche Eishockey Liga in Germany, two with the Hamburg Freezers and one with Grizzly Adams Wolfsburg. In 2010, Sarno moved to Italy and signed with the Serie A club HC Alleghe.

== Transactions ==
- February 16, 2004 - Edmonton trades Sarno to Vancouver in exchange for Tyler Moss
- August 22, 2005 - Sarno signs with Columbus
- May 22, 2006 - Sarno signs with HC Fribourg-Gottéron (Swiss League)

== Career statistics ==
			Regular season					Playoffs
Season	Team	League	GP	G	A	Pts	PIM	GP	G	A	Pts	PIM
1995–96	North York Rangers	MetJHL	52	39	57	96	27	—	—	—	—	—
1996–97	Windsor Spitfires	OHL	66	20	63	83	59	5	0	3	3	6
1997–98	Windsor Spitfires	OHL	63	33	88	121	18	—	—	—	—	—
1997–98	Hamilton Bulldogs	AHL	8	1	1	2	2	—	—	—	—	—
1998–99	Sarnia Sting	OHL	68	37	93	130	49	6	1	7	8	2
1999–2000	Hamilton Bulldogs	AHL	67	10	36	46	31	—	—	—	—	—
2000–01	Hamilton Bulldogs	AHL	79	19	46	65	64	—	—	—	—	—
2001–02	Hamilton Bulldogs	AHL	76	12	40	52	38	15	6	7	13	4
2002–03	Blues	SM-l	45	17	23	40	34	7	2	1	3	2
2003–04	Edmonton Oilers	NHL	6	1	0	1	2	—	—	—	—	—
2003–04	Toronto Roadrunners	AHL	31	6	12	18	29	—	—	—	—	—
2003–04	Manitoba Moose	AHL	23	5	9	14	6	—	—	—	—	—
2004–05	Manitoba Moose	AHL	80	16	66	82	53	14	1	8	9	4
2005–06	Columbus Blue Jackets	NHL	1	0	0	0	0	—	—	—	—	—
2005–06	Syracuse Crunch	AHL	39	12	39	51	20	6	0	5	5	8
2006–07	HC Fribourg-Gottéron	NLA	26	5	18	23	22	—	—	—	—	—
2007–08	Hamburg Freezers	DEL	56	26	48	74	54	8	4	9	13	14
2008–09	Hamburg Freezers	DEL	38	5	25	30	28	8	1	4	5	6
2009–10	Grizzly Adams Wolfsburg	DEL	40	9	29	38	32	7	1	2	3	6
2010–11	Lausanne HC	NLB	2	0	2	2	0	—	—	—	—	—
2010–11	HC Alleghe	ITA	5	3	5	8	2	5	2	5	7	4
AHL totals			403	81	249	330	243	35	7	20	27	16
NHL totals			7	1	0	1	2	—	—	—	—	—
DEL totals			134	40	102	142	114	23	6	15	21	26
