= 2003–04 NHL season =

National Hockey League season

- League: National Hockey League
- Sport: Ice hockey
- Duration: October 8, 2003 – June 7, 2004
- Games: 82
- Teams: 30
- TV partner(s): CBC, TSN, RDS (Canada); ESPN, ABC (United States)

Draft
- Top draft pick: Marc-Andre Fleury
- Picked by: Pittsburgh Penguins

Regular season
- Presidents' Trophy: Detroit Red Wings
- Season MVP: Martin St. Louis (Lightning)
- Top scorer: Martin St. Louis (Lightning)

Playoffs
- Playoffs MVP: Brad Richards (Lightning)

Stanley Cup
- Champions: Tampa Bay Lightning
- Runners-up: Calgary Flames

Seasons
- 2002–03 2004–05

The 2003–04 NHL season was the 87th regular season of the National Hockey League. The Stanley Cup champions were the Tampa Bay Lightning, who won the best of seven series four games to three against the Calgary Flames.

For the fourth time in eight years, the all-time record for total shutouts in a season was shattered, as 192 shutouts were recorded. The 2003–04 regular season was also the first one (excluding the lockout-shortened 1994–95 season) since 1967–68 in which there was neither a 50-goal scorer, nor a 100-point scorer. It was also the final NHL season before the 2004–05 NHL lockout with games resuming in the fall of 2005 as part of the 2005–06 season, and the final season in which games could end in ties.

== League business ==
=== Collective bargaining agreement ===
The existing NHL collective bargaining agreement (CBA) between the league and the players was set to expire in September 2004. During the entire 2003–04 season, NHL Commissioner Gary Bettman and NHL Players' Association (NHLPA) head Bob Goodenow waged a war of words with no CBA being signed. The dispute eventually led to the 2004–05 NHL lockout and the cancellation of the 2004–05 season.

=== New scheduling formula ===
The schedule of 82 games was revamped. The new format increased divisional games from five to six per team (24 total), and decreased inter-conference games to at least one per team, with three extra games (18 in total).

=== Entry draft ===
The 2003 NHL entry draft was held on June 21–22, 2003 at the Gaylord Entertainment Center in Nashville, Tennessee. Marc-Andre Fleury was selected first overall by the Pittsburgh Penguins.

=== Preseason games in Europe ===
As part of the NHL Challenge, the Toronto Maple Leafs played a three-preseason-game series in Europe against Finnish team Jokerit Helsinki and the Swedish teams Djurgården Stockholm and Färjestad Karlstad.

== Uniform changes ==
The alternating of jerseys was changed. For the first season since the 1969–70 season, teams would now wear their colored jerseys at home and white jerseys away.

== Arena changes ==
- The Edmonton Oilers' home arena, Skyreach Centre, was renamed Rexall Place as part of a new naming rights agreement with Rexall that was signed on November 20, 2003.
- The Philadelphia Flyers's home arena, the First Union Center, was renamed the Wachovia Center after First Union merged with Wachovia.
- The Phoenix Coyotes moved from America West Arena in Phoenix, Arizona to Glendale Arena in Glendale, Arizona on December 27, 2003.

== Regular season ==
=== First regular season outdoor game ===
The Heritage Classic, the first NHL regular season game to be played outdoors, was held on November 22, 2003, at Commonwealth Stadium in Edmonton, Alberta. The Montreal Canadiens defeated the Edmonton Oilers, 4–3.

=== All-Star Game ===
The All-Star Game was played on February 8, 2004, at the Xcel Energy Center in Saint Paul, Minnesota, the home of the Minnesota Wild.

=== Highlights ===
On September 26, just before the season was to begin, young Atlanta Thrashers star Dany Heatley crashed his Ferrari in suburban Atlanta. The passenger, Thrashers teammate Dan Snyder, was killed. Heatley himself was badly injured and eventually charged with vehicular homicide.

Entering the season, the two Stanley Cup favorites were the Ottawa Senators in the Eastern Conference, who had won the Presidents' Trophy and come within a win of the Stanley Cup Final the year before, and the Colorado Avalanche in the Western Conference, who, despite losing legendary goaltender Patrick Roy to retirement, added both Teemu Selanne and Paul Kariya to an already star-studded lineup. Neither of these teams, however, were as successful as expected, with Ottawa finishing fifth in their conference and Colorado finishing fourth, losing the Northwest Division title for the first time in a decade when the franchise was still known as the Quebec Nordiques.

The greatest disappointments were the Mighty Ducks of Anaheim, who, despite making it to Game 7 of the Stanley Cup Final the year prior and adding both Sergei Fedorov and Vaclav Prospal, failed to make the playoffs. The Los Angeles Kings failed to make the playoffs in large part due to a season-ending 11-game losing streak. In the East, the star-studded New York Rangers again failed to make the playoffs. The Washington Capitals, who were regarded as a contender, also stumbled early in the season and never recovered. The end of the season saw two of the most extensive housecleanings in League history, as the Rangers and Capitals traded away many of their stars and entered "rebuilding mode." The Capitals traded away Jaromir Jagr, Peter Bondra, Sergei Gonchar, Robert Lang and Anson Carter, while the Rangers moved Petr Nedved, Brian Leetch, Anson Carter and Alexei Kovalev to other NHL teams.

The most surprising teams were the Tampa Bay Lightning in the East and the San Jose Sharks in the West. The Lightning, who had a remarkable season with only 20 man-games lost to injury, finished atop the Eastern Conference, while the Sharks, who were firmly in rebuilding mode after a disastrous 28–37–9–8 campaign the last season, came second in the West and won the Pacific Division.

Two other teams that did better than expected were carried by surprising young goaltenders. The Calgary Flames ended a seven-year playoff drought backed by the solid play of Miikka Kiprusoff, and the Boston Bruins won the Northeast Division by a whisker over the Toronto Maple Leafs with the help of eventual Calder Memorial Trophy-winning goaltender Andrew Raycroft.

Goaltending was also the story of the Presidents' Trophy-winning Detroit Red Wings as the return from retirement of legend Dominik Hasek bumped Curtis Joseph to the minor leagues. At the same time, long-time back up Manny Legace recorded better numbers than both veterans and won the starting job in the playoffs.

Of note is the fact that the Nashville Predators made the playoffs for the first time in franchise history, though they were dispatched by a star-studded Detroit Red Wings team in the first round.

The regular season ended controversially, when in March 2004, the Vancouver Canucks' Todd Bertuzzi infamously attacked and severely injured the Colorado Avalanche's Steve Moore, forcing the latter eventually to retire.

== Standings ==
Detroit Red Wings won the Presidents' Trophy and home-ice advantage throughout the playoffs.

For rankings in conference, division leaders are automatically ranked 1–3. These three, plus the next five teams in the conference standings, earn playoff berths at the end of the season.

=== Eastern Conference ===
Atlantic Division
No.	CR		GP	W	L	T	OTL	GF	GA	PTS
1	3	**Philadelphia Flyers**	82	40	21	15	6	229	186	101
2	6	**New Jersey Devils**	82	43	25	12	2	213	164	100
3	8	**New York Islanders**	82	38	29	11	4	237	210	91
4	13	New York Rangers	82	27	40	7	8	206	250	69
5	15	Pittsburgh Penguins	82	23	47	8	4	190	303	58

Note: CR = Conference rank; GP = Games played; W = Wins; L = Losses; T = Ties; OTL = Overtime loss; GF = Goals for; GA = Goals against; Pts = Points
Bolded teams qualified for the playoffs.

Northeast Division
No.	CR		GP	W	L	T	OTL	GF	GA	Pts
1	2	**Boston Bruins**	82	41	19	15	7	209	188	104
2	4	**Toronto Maple Leafs**	82	45	24	10	3	242	204	103
3	5	**Ottawa Senators**	82	43	23	10	6	262	189	102
4	7	**Montreal Canadiens**	82	41	30	7	4	208	192	93
5	9	Buffalo Sabres	82	37	34	7	4	220	221	85

Note: CR = Conference rank; GP = Games played; W = Wins; L = Losses; T = Ties; OTL = Overtime loss; GF = Goals for; GA = Goals against; Pts = Points
Bolded teams qualified for the playoffs.

Southeast Division
No.	CR		GP	W	L	T	OTL	GF	GA	PTS
1	1	**Tampa Bay Lightning**	82	46	22	8	6	245	192	106
2	10	Atlanta Thrashers	82	33	37	8	4	214	243	78
3	11	Carolina Hurricanes	82	28	34	14	6	172	209	76
4	12	Florida Panthers	82	28	35	15	4	188	221	75
5	14	Washington Capitals	82	23	46	10	3	186	253	59

Note: CR = Conference rank; GP = Games played; W = Wins; L = Losses; T = Ties; OTL = Overtime loss; GF = Goals for; GA = Goals against; Pts = Points
Bolded teams qualified for the playoffs.

Eastern Conference
R		Div	GP	W	L	T	OTL	GF	GA	Pts
**1**	**Z-** Tampa Bay Lightning	**SE**	**82**	**46**	**22**	**8**	**6**	**245**	**192**	106
**2**	**Y-** Boston Bruins	**NE**	**82**	**41**	**19**	**15**	**7**	**209**	**188**	104
**3**	**Y-** Philadelphia Flyers	**AT**	**82**	**40**	**21**	**15**	**6**	**209**	**188**	101
**4**	**X-** Toronto Maple Leafs	**NE**	**82**	**45**	**24**	**10**	**3**	**242**	**204**	103
**5**	**X-** Ottawa Senators	**NE**	**82**	**43**	**23**	**10**	**6**	**262**	**189**	102
**6**	**X-** New Jersey Devils	**AT**	**82**	**43**	**25**	**12**	**2**	**213**	**164**	100
**7**	**X-** Montreal Canadiens	**NE**	**82**	**41**	**30**	**7**	**4**	**208**	**192**	93
**8**	**X-** New York Islanders	**AT**	**82**	**38**	**29**	**11**	**4**	**237**	**210**	91
8.5
9	Buffalo Sabres	NE	82	37	34	7	4	220	221	85
10	Atlanta Thrashers	SE	82	33	37	8	4	214	243	78
11	Carolina Hurricanes	SE	82	28	34	14	6	172	209	76
12	Florida Panthers	SE	82	28	35	15	4	188	221	75
13	New York Rangers	AT	82	27	40	7	8	206	250	69
14	Washington Capitals	SE	82	23	46	10	3	186	253	59
15	Pittsburgh Penguins	AT	82	23	47	8	4	190	303	58

Divisions: AT – Atlantic, NE – Northeast, SE – Southeast

Z – Clinched conference; Y – Clinched division; X – Clinched playoff spot

=== Western Conference ===
Central Division
No.	CR		GP	W	L	T	OTL	GF	GA	Pts
1	1	**Detroit Red Wings**	82	48	21	11	2	255	189	109
2	7	**St. Louis Blues**	82	39	30	11	2	191	198	91
3	8	**Nashville Predators**	82	38	29	11	4	216	217	91
4	14	Columbus Blue Jackets	82	25	45	8	4	177	238	62
5	15	Chicago Blackhawks	82	20	43	11	8	188	259	59

Note: CR = Conference rank; GP = Games played; W = Wins; L = Losses; T = Ties; OTL = Overtime loss; GF = Goals for; GA = Goals against; Pts = Points
Bolded teams qualified for the playoffs.

Northwest Division
No.	CR		GP	W	L	T	OTL	GF	GA	PTS
1	3	**Vancouver Canucks**	82	43	24	10	5	235	194	101
2	4	**Colorado Avalanche**	82	40	22	13	7	235	198	100
3	6	**Calgary Flames**	82	42	30	7	3	200	176	94
4	9	Edmonton Oilers	82	36	29	12	5	221	208	89
5	10	Minnesota Wild	82	30	29	20	3	188	183	83

Note: CR = Conference rank; GP = Games played; W = Wins; L = Losses; T = Ties; OTL = Overtime loss; GF = Goals for; GA = Goals against; Pts = Points
Bolded teams qualified for the playoffs.

Pacific Division
No.	CR		GP	W	L	T	OTL	GF	GA	Pts
1	2	**San Jose Sharks**	82	43	21	12	6	219	183	104
2	5	**Dallas Stars**	82	41	26	13	2	194	175	97
3	11	Los Angeles Kings	82	28	29	16	9	205	217	81
4	12	Mighty Ducks of Anaheim	82	29	35	10	8	184	213	76
5	13	Phoenix Coyotes	82	22	36	18	6	188	245	68

Note: CR = Conference rank; GP = Games played; W = Wins; L = Losses; T = Ties; OTL = Overtime loss; GF = Goals for; GA = Goals against; Pts = Points
Bolded teams qualified for the playoffs.

Western Conference
R		Div	GP	W	L	T	OTL	GF	GA	Pts
**1**	**P-** Detroit Red Wings	**CE**	**82**	**48**	**21**	**11**	**2**	**255**	**189**	109
**2**	**Y-** San Jose Sharks	**PA**	**82**	**43**	**21**	**12**	**6**	**255**	**183**	104
**3**	**Y-** Vancouver Canucks	**NW**	**82**	**43**	**24**	**10**	**5**	**235**	**194**	101
**4**	**X-** Colorado Avalanche	**NW**	**82**	**40**	**22**	**13**	**7**	**236**	**198**	100
**5**	**X-** Dallas Stars	**PA**	**82**	**41**	**26**	**13**	**2**	**194**	**175**	97
**6**	**X-** Calgary Flames	**NW**	**82**	**42**	**30**	**7**	**3**	**200**	**176**	94
**7**	**X-** St. Louis Blues	**CE**	**82**	**39**	**30**	**11**	**2**	**191**	**198**	91
**8**	**X-** Nashville Predators	**CE**	**82**	**38**	**29**	**11**	**4**	**216**	**217**	91
8.5
9	Edmonton Oilers	NW	82	36	29	12	5	221	208	89
10	Minnesota Wild	NW	82	30	29	20	3	188	183	83
11	Los Angeles Kings	PA	82	28	29	16	9	205	217	81
12	Mighty Ducks of Anaheim	PA	82	29	35	10	8	184	213	76
13	Phoenix Coyotes	PA	82	22	36	18	6	188	245	68
14	Columbus Blue Jackets	CE	82	25	45	8	4	177	238	62
15	Chicago Blackhawks	CE	82	20	43	11	8	188	259	59

Divisions: CE – Central, PA – Pacific, NW – Northwest

P – Clinched Presidents Trophy; Y – Clinched division; X – Clinched playoff spot

== Playoffs ==
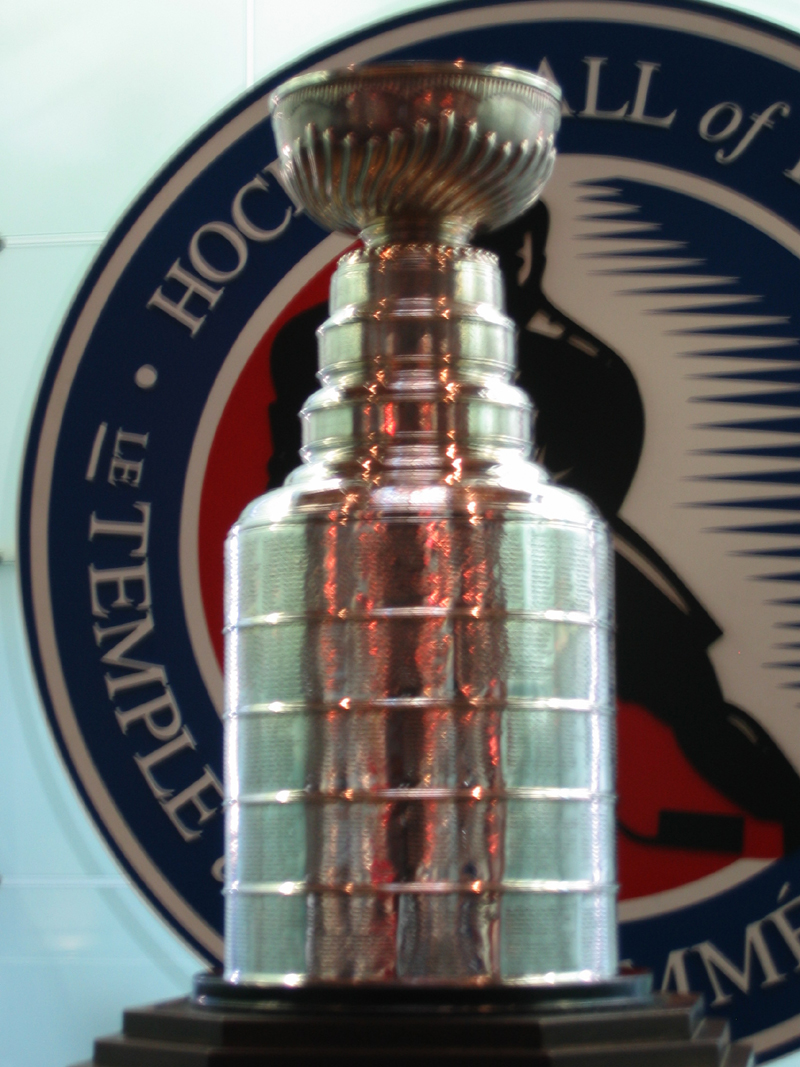
Lord Stanley's Cup

=== Bracket ===
In each round, teams competed in a best-of-seven series following a 2–2–1–1–1 format (scores in the bracket indicate the number of games won in each best-of-seven series). The team with home ice advantage played at home for games one and two (and games five and seven, if necessary), and the other team played at home for games three and four (and game six, if necessary). The top eight teams in each conference made the playoffs, with the three division winners seeded 1–3 based on regular season record, and the five remaining teams seeded 4–8.

The NHL used "re-seeding" instead of a fixed bracket playoff system. During the first three rounds, the highest remaining seed in each conference was matched against the lowest remaining seed, the second-highest remaining seed played the second-lowest remaining seed, and so forth. The higher-seeded team was awarded home ice advantage. The two conference winners then advanced to the Stanley Cup Final, where home ice advantage was awarded to the team that had the better regular season record.

Conference quarterfinals	Conference semifinals
1	Tampa Bay	4
8	NY Islanders	1
1	Tampa Bay	4
7	Montreal	0
2	Boston	3
7	Montreal	4
Eastern Conference
3	Philadelphia	4
6	New Jersey	1
3	Philadelphia	4
4	Toronto	2
4	Toronto	4
5	Ottawa	3
1	Detroit	4
8	Nashville	2
1	Detroit	2
6	Calgary	4
2	San Jose	4
7	St. Louis	1
Western Conference
3	Vancouver	3
6	Calgary	4
2	San Jose	4
4	Colorado	2
4	Colorado	4
5	Dallas	1

Conference finals
1	Tampa Bay	4
3	Philadelphia	3
6	Calgary	4
2	San Jose	2

Stanley Cup Final
E1	Tampa Bay	4
W6	Calgary	3

== Awards ==
The NHL Awards presentation took place in Toronto.

Presidents' Trophy:	Detroit Red Wings
Prince of Wales Trophy: (Eastern Conference playoff champion)	Tampa Bay Lightning
Clarence S. Campbell Bowl: (Western Conference playoff champion)	Calgary Flames
Art Ross Trophy:	Martin St. Louis, Tampa Bay Lightning
Bill Masterton Memorial Trophy:	Bryan Berard, Chicago Blackhawks
Calder Memorial Trophy:	Andrew Raycroft, Boston Bruins
Conn Smythe Trophy:	Brad Richards, Tampa Bay Lightning
Frank J. Selke Trophy:	Kris Draper, Detroit Red Wings
Hart Memorial Trophy:	Martin St. Louis, Tampa Bay Lightning
Jack Adams Award:	John Tortorella, Tampa Bay Lightning
James Norris Memorial Trophy:	Scott Niedermayer, New Jersey Devils
King Clancy Memorial Trophy:	Jarome Iginla, Calgary Flames
Lady Byng Memorial Trophy:	Brad Richards, Tampa Bay Lightning
Lester B. Pearson Award:	Martin St. Louis, Tampa Bay Lightning
Maurice "Rocket" Richard Trophy:	Jarome Iginla, Calgary Flames; Rick Nash, Columbus Blue Jackets; Ilya Kovalchuk, Atlanta Thrashers
NHL Foundation Player Award:	Jarome Iginla, Calgary Flames
NHL Plus-Minus Award:	Martin St. Louis, Tampa Bay Lightning; Marek Malik, Vancouver Canucks
NHL/Sheraton Road Performer Award:	Joe Sakic, Colorado Avalanche
Roger Crozier Saving Grace Award:	Dwayne Roloson, Minnesota Wild
Vezina Trophy:	Martin Brodeur, New Jersey Devils
William M. Jennings Trophy:	Martin Brodeur, New Jersey Devils

=== All-Star teams ===
First team	Position	Second team
Martin Brodeur, New Jersey Devils	G	Roberto Luongo, Florida Panthers
Scott Niedermayer, New Jersey Devils	D	Chris Pronger, St. Louis Blues
Zdeno Chara, Ottawa Senators	D	Bryan McCabe, Toronto Maple Leafs
Joe Sakic, Colorado Avalanche	C	Mats Sundin, Toronto Maple Leafs
Martin St. Louis, Tampa Bay Lightning	RW	Jarome Iginla, Calgary Flames
Markus Naslund, Vancouver Canucks	LW	Ilya Kovalchuk, Atlanta Thrashers

== Player statistics ==
=== Scoring leaders ===
Note: GP = Games played, G = Goals, A = Assists, Pts = Points

Player	Team	GP	G	A	Pts
Martin St. Louis	Tampa Bay	82	38	56	94
Ilya Kovalchuk	Atlanta	81	41	46	87
Joe Sakic	Colorado	81	33	54	87
Markus Naslund	Vancouver	78	35	49	84
Marian Hossa	Ottawa	81	36	46	82
Patrik Elias	New Jersey	82	38	43	81
Daniel Alfredsson	Ottawa	77	32	48	80
Cory Stillman	Tampa Bay	81	25	55	80
Robert Lang	Washington / Detroit	69	30	49	79
Brad Richards	Tampa Bay	82	26	53	79
Alex Tanguay	Colorado	69	25	54	79

=== Leading goaltenders ===
Note: GP = Games played; Mins = Minutes played; W = Wins; L = Losses: OT = Overtime losses; GA = Goals allowed; SO = Shutouts; GAA = Goals against average

Player	Team	GP	Mins	W	L	T	GA	SO	SV	GAA
Miikka Kiprusoff	Calgary	38	2300	24	10	4	65	4	.933	1.70
Dwayne Roloson	Minnesota	48	2846	19	18	11	89	5	.933	1.88
Marty Turco	Dallas	73	4359	37	21	13	144	9	.913	1.98
Martin Brodeur	New Jersey	75	4554	38	26	11	154	11	.917	2.03
Robert Esche	Philadelphia	40	2322	21	11	7	79	3	.915	2.04
Andrew Raycroft	Boston	57	3420	29	18	9	117	3	.926	2.05
David Aebischer	Colorado	62	3702	32	19	9	129	4	.924	2.09
Manny Legace	Detroit	41	3702	23	10	5	82	3	.920	2.12
Ed Belfour	Toronto	59	3444	34	19	6	122	10	.918	2.13
Evgeni Nabokov	San Jose	59	3455	31	19	8	127	9	.921	2.21

== Coaches ==
=== Eastern Conference ===
- Atlanta Thrashers: Bob Hartley
- Boston Bruins: Mike Sullivan
- Buffalo Sabres: Lindy Ruff
- Carolina Hurricanes: Peter Laviolette
- Florida Panthers: Rick Dudley and John Torchetti
- Montreal Canadiens: Claude Julien
- New Jersey Devils: Pat Burns
- New York Islanders: Steve Stirling
- New York Rangers: Glen Sather
- Ottawa Senators: Jacques Martin
- Philadelphia Flyers: Ken Hitchcock
- Pittsburgh Penguins: Ed Olczyk
- Tampa Bay Lightning: John Tortorella
- Toronto Maple Leafs: Pat Quinn
- Washington Capitals: Glen Hanlon

=== Western Conference ===
- Mighty Ducks of Anaheim: Mike Babcock
- Calgary Flames: Darryl Sutter
- Chicago Blackhawks: Brian Sutter
- Colorado Avalanche: Tony Granato
- Columbus Blue Jackets: Doug MacLean
- Dallas Stars: Dave Tippett
- Detroit Red Wings: Dave Lewis
- Edmonton Oilers: Craig MacTavish
- Los Angeles Kings: Andy Murray
- Minnesota Wild: Jacques Lemaire
- Nashville Predators: Barry Trotz
- Phoenix Coyotes: Bobby Francis and Rick Bowness
- San Jose Sharks: Ron Wilson
- St. Louis Blues: Joel Quenneville
- Vancouver Canucks: Marc Crawford

== Milestones ==
=== Debuts ===
The following is a list of players of note who played their first NHL game in 2003–04 (listed with their first team):

- Chris Kunitz, Mighty Ducks of Anaheim
- Patrice Bergeron, Boston Bruins
- Jason Pominville, Buffalo Sabres
- Derek Roy, Buffalo Sabres
- Eric Staal, Carolina Hurricanes
- Travis Moen, Chicago Blackhawks
- Tuomo Ruutu, Chicago Blackhawks
- Nikolai Zherdev, Columbus Blue Jackets
- Niklas Kronwall, Detroit Red Wings
- Dustin Brown, Los Angeles Kings
- **Brent Burns, Minnesota Wild**
- Tomas Plekanec, Montreal Canadiens
- Jordin Tootoo, Nashville Predators
- Marek Zidlicky, Nashville Predators
- Dominic Moore, New York Rangers
- Fedor Tyutin, New York Rangers
- Marc-Andre Fleury, Pittsburgh Penguins
- Ryan Kesler, Vancouver Canucks
- Alexander Semin, Washington Capitals

bold - active in the NHL, as of the 2025-26 NHL season

=== Last games ===
The following is a list of players of note who played their last NHL game in 2003–04, listed with their team:

- Valeri Bure, Dallas Stars
- Shayne Corson, Dallas Stars
- Vincent Damphousse, San Jose Sharks
- Ron Francis, Toronto Maple Leafs
- Artūrs Irbe, Carolina Hurricanes
- Kenny Jonsson, New York Islanders
- Joe Juneau, Montreal Canadiens
- Mike Keane, Vancouver Canucks
- Trent Klatt, Los Angeles Kings
- Igor Larionov, New Jersey Devils
- Curtis Leschyshyn, Ottawa Senators
- Dave Lowry, Calgary Flames
- Al MacInnis, St. Louis Blues
- Mark Messier, New York Rangers (The last active player to have played in the World Hockey Association, also last player to have played in the 1970s.)
- Steve Moore, Colorado Avalanche
- Adam Oates, Edmonton Oilers
- James Patrick, Buffalo Sabres
- Felix Potvin, Boston Bruins
- Scott Stevens, New Jersey Devils
- Steve Thomas, Detroit Red Wings
- Roman Turek, Calgary Flames

== Broadcasting ==
=== Canada ===
This was the second season of the league's Canadian national broadcast rights deals with CBC and TSN. CBC continued to air Saturday night Hockey Night in Canada regular season games, while TSN's coverage included Wednesday Night Hockey and other selected weeknights. During the first three rounds of the Stanley Cup playoffs, TSN televised all-U.S. games while CBC aired all games involving Canadian teams. CBC then had exclusive coverage of the Stanley Cup Final.

=== United States ===
This was the fifth and final year of the league's U.S. national broadcast rights deal with ESPN and ABC. ESPN and ESPN2 aired weeknight games throughout the regular season. ABC's coverage included the All-Star Game and five weeks' worth of regional games on Saturday afternoons between January and March. During the first two rounds of the playoffs, ESPN and ESPN2 aired selected games, while ABC had Saturday regional telecasts. Each U.S. team's regional broadcaster produced local coverage of first and second-round games (except for those games on ABC). ABC's weekend telecasts continued into the Conference Finals, while ESPN had the rest of the third-round games. ESPN then aired the first two games of the Stanley Cup Final before the rest of the series shifted to ABC.

In May 2004, NBC reached an agreement to broadcast a slate of regular season games and playoff games. ESPN was only willing to renew its contract for two additional years, without games on ABC, with an opt-out clause after the first year. This was the final season for ESPN and ABC, however, the network would regain NHL coverage starting in the 2021–22 season.

== See also ==
- List of Stanley Cup champions
- NHL All-Star Game
- NHL All-Rookie Team
- 2003 in sports
- 2004 in sports
- Red Mile
