= Andrei Pervyshin =

Russian ice hockey player

- Born: February 2, 1985 (age 41) Arkhangelsk, RUS
- Height: 5 ft 8.5 in (174 cm)
- Weight: 176 lb (80 kg; 12 st 8 lb)
- Position: Defence
- Shoots: Left
- KHL team Former teams: Avangard Omsk; Lokomotiv Yaroslavl; Ak Bars Kazan; Avangard Omsk; SKA Saint Petersburg; CSKA Moscow; HC Sochi; Traktor Chelyabinsk
- NHL draft: 253rd overall, 2003; St. Louis Blues
- Playing career: 2002–present

Andrei Pervyshin (born February 2, 1985) is a Russian professional ice hockey player who currently plays Avangard Omsk in the Kontinental Hockey League (KHL). He was selected by St. Louis Blues in the 8th round (253rd overall) of the 2003 NHL entry draft.

Pervyshin has previously played with HC CSKA Moscow for the 2013–14 season, before signing a one-year contract with expansion club HC Sochi on May 21, 2014. Peryshin was later selected as Sochi's inaugural team Captain for the 2014–15 season.

== Career statistics ==
=== Regular season and playoffs ===
			Regular season					Playoffs
Season	Team	League	GP	G	A	Pts	PIM	GP	G	A	Pts	PIM
2001–02	Lokomotiv–2 Yaroslavl	RUS.3	21	2	6	8	36	—	—	—	—	—
2002–03	Lokomotiv Yaroslavl	RSL	9	0	1	1	0	—	—	—	—	—
2002–03	Lokomotiv–2 Yaroslavl	RUS.3	32	5	12	17	66	—	—	—	—	—
2003–04	Spartak Moscow	RUS.2	59	3	6	9	14	13	0	1	1	4
2003–04	Spartak–2 Moscow	RUS.3	3	0	1	1	4	—	—	—	—	—
2004–05	Ak Bars Kazan	RSL	54	0	3	3	10	2	0	0	0	0
2004–05	Ak Bars–2 Kazan	RUS.3	1	0	1	1	2	—	—	—	—	—
2005–06	Ak Bars Kazan	RSL	48	3	7	10	22	13	0	3	3	14
2005–06	Ak Bars–2 Kazan	RUS.3	2	0	1	1	2	—	—	—	—	—
2006–07	Ak Bars Kazan	RSL	45	5	8	13	71	12	2	3	5	8
2007–08	Ak Bars Kazan	RSL	55	7	8	15	40	10	1	1	2	2
2008–09	Ak Bars Kazan	KHL	54	6	21	27	28	21	1	9	10	10
2009–10	Ak Bars Kazan	KHL	53	5	15	20	26	17	0	2	2	6
2010–11	Avangard Omsk	KHL	52	5	19	24	28	14	2	3	5	10
2011–12	Avangard Omsk	KHL	23	1	1	2	16	—	—	—	—	—
2011–12	SKA St. Petersburg	KHL	23	1	7	8	10	15	2	4	6	4
2012–13	SKA St. Petersburg	KHL	21	0	2	2	11	8	1	1	2	0
2013–14	CSKA Moscow	KHL	27	2	5	7	10	4	0	1	1	2
2014–15	HC Sochi	KHL	30	3	3	6	16	2	0	0	0	2
2015–16	Traktor Chelyabinsk	KHL	16	2	1	3	6	—	—	—	—	—
2015–16	Avangard Omsk	KHL	16	2	3	5	6	11	0	2	2	12
2016–17	Metallurg Novokuznetsk	KHL	20	2	4	6	4	—	—	—	—	—
2016–17	Neftekhimik Nizhnekamsk	KHL	13	1	2	3	6	—	—	—	—	—
2017–18	Saryarka Karagandy	VHL	8	1	2	3	4	—	—	—	—	—
2018–19	Saryarka Karagandy	VHL	3	0	1	1	2	—	—	—	—	—
2018–19	Chamonix HC	FRA	1	0	0	0	0	—	—	—	—	—
2020–21	Zeytinburnu Belediyespor	TUR	12	1	17	18	4	—	—	—	—	—
2021–22	Neman Grodno	BLR	11	1	6	7	8	5	0	0	0	2
RSL totals			211	15	27	42	143	39	3	7	10	24
KHL totals			348	30	83	113	167	92	6	22	28	46

=== International ===
Year	Team	Event	GP	G	A	Pts	PIM
2002	Russia	U18
2003	Russia	WJC18	6	0	3	3	12
Junior totals			6	0	3	3	12
