= 2003–04 New York Rangers season =

NHL hockey team season

2003–04 New York Rangers
- Division: 4th Atlantic
- Conference: 13th Eastern
- 2003–04 record: 27–40–7–8
- Home record: 13–21–3–4
- Road record: 14–19–4–4
- Goals for: 206
- Goals against: 250

Team information
- General manager: Glen Sather
- Coach: Glen Sather (Oct.–Feb.); Tom Renney (Feb.–Apr.)
- Captain: Mark Messier
- Alternate captains: Brian Leetch (Oct.–Mar.); Jaromir Jagr (Mar.–Apr.); Eric Lindros
- Arena: Madison Square Garden
- Average attendance: 18,073 (99.3%)
- Minor league affiliates: Hartford Wolf Pack; Charlotte Checkers

Team leaders
- Goals: Bobby Holík (25)
- Assists: Bobby Holik (31)
- Points: Bobby Holik (56)
- Penalty minutes: Matthew Barnaby (120)
- Plus/minus: Matthew Barnaby (+15)
- Wins: Mike Dunham (16)
- Goals against average: Jussi Markkanen (2.56)

The 2003–04 New York Rangers season was the franchise's 78th season. The team finished with one of the worst records in the league and missed the Stanley Cup playoffs for the seventh consecutive season for the first time in franchise history despite bringing in Jaromir Jagr midway through the season. The team would eventually trade away most of its major acquisitions, including their long-time defensive stalwart Brian Leetch. This would prove to be the final season for team captain Mark Messier.

== Off-season ==
On July 1, 2003, general manager Glen Sather announced he would remain the Rangers head coach.

== Regular season ==
Glen Sather stepped down as head coach on February 25, 2004, to focus on his managerial duties. Assistant coach Tom Renney was named interim head coach. Sather would make nine trades between then and the March 9 trading deadline, shipping out several veteran players for draft picks and prospects.

=== Final standings ===
Atlantic Division
No.	CR		GP	W	L	T	OTL	GF	GA	PTS
1	3	**Philadelphia Flyers**	82	40	21	15	6	229	186	101
2	6	**New Jersey Devils**	82	43	25	12	2	213	164	100
3	8	**New York Islanders**	82	38	29	11	4	237	210	91
4	13	New York Rangers	82	27	40	7	8	206	250	69
5	15	Pittsburgh Penguins	82	23	47	8	4	190	303	58

Note: CR = Conference rank; GP = Games played; W = Wins; L = Losses; T = Ties; OTL = Overtime loss; GF = Goals for; GA = Goals against; Pts = Points
Bolded teams qualified for the playoffs.

Eastern Conference
R		Div	GP	W	L	T	OTL	GF	GA	Pts
**1**	**Z-** Tampa Bay Lightning	**SE**	**82**	**46**	**22**	**8**	**6**	**245**	**192**	106
**2**	**Y-** Boston Bruins	**NE**	**82**	**41**	**19**	**15**	**7**	**209**	**188**	104
**3**	**Y-** Philadelphia Flyers	**AT**	**82**	**40**	**21**	**15**	**6**	**209**	**188**	101
**4**	**X-** Toronto Maple Leafs	**NE**	**82**	**45**	**24**	**10**	**3**	**242**	**204**	103
**5**	**X-** Ottawa Senators	**NE**	**82**	**43**	**23**	**10**	**6**	**262**	**189**	102
**6**	**X-** New Jersey Devils	**AT**	**82**	**43**	**25**	**12**	**2**	**213**	**164**	100
**7**	**X-** Montreal Canadiens	**NE**	**82**	**41**	**30**	**7**	**4**	**208**	**192**	93
**8**	**X-** New York Islanders	**AT**	**82**	**38**	**29**	**11**	**4**	**237**	**210**	91
8.5
9	Buffalo Sabres	NE	82	37	34	7	4	220	221	85
10	Atlanta Thrashers	SE	82	33	37	8	4	214	243	78
11	Carolina Hurricanes	SE	82	28	34	14	6	172	209	76
12	Florida Panthers	SE	82	28	35	15	4	188	221	75
13	New York Rangers	AT	82	27	40	7	8	206	250	69
14	Washington Capitals	SE	82	23	46	10	3	186	253	59
15	Pittsburgh Penguins	AT	82	23	47	8	4	190	303	58

Divisions: AT – Atlantic, NE – Northeast, SE – Southeast

Z – Clinched conference; Y – Clinched division; X – Clinched playoff spot

== Schedule and results ==
2003–04 regular season
October: 3–3–2–0 (home: 3–1–2–0; road: 0–2–0–0)

Game	Date	Opponent	Score	Record	Recap
1	October 10	@ Minnesota Wild	5 – 3	0–1–0–0	L
2	October 11	@ Columbus Blue Jackets	5 – 0	0–2–0–0	L
3	October 16	Atlanta Thrashers	0 – 0 OT	0–2–1–0	T
4	October 18	Carolina Hurricanes	2 – 2 OT	0–2–2–0	T
5	October 20	Florida Panthers	3 – 1	1–2–2–0	W
6	October 25	Detroit Red Wings	3 – 1	2–2–2–0	W
7	October 28	Mighty Ducks of Anaheim	3 – 1	2–3–2–0	L
8	October 30	Carolina Hurricanes	4 – 1	3–3–2–0	W

November: 6–5–3–2 (home: 3–2–0–2; road: 3–3–3–0)

Game	Date	Opponent	Score	Record	Recap
9	November 1	@ Montreal Canadiens	5 – 1	4–3–2–0	W
10	November 2	Colorado Avalanche	3 – 2 OT	4–3–2–1	OTL
11	November 4	Dallas Stars	3 – 0	5–3–2–1	W
12	November 6	@ Carolina Hurricanes	6 – 3	5–4–2–1	L
13	November 8	Philadelphia Flyers	2 – 1 OT	5–4–2–2	OTL
14	November 10	Edmonton Oilers	5 – 4	5–5–2–2	L
15	November 12	Pittsburgh Penguins	6 – 2	6–5–2–2	W
16	November 15	@ New Jersey Devils	5 – 0	6–6–2–2	L
17	November 16	@ Chicago Blackhawks	2 – 2 OT	6–6–3–2	T
18	November 18	@ San Jose Sharks	2 – 2 OT	6–6–4–2	T
19	November 20	@ Colorado Avalanche	4 – 3	6–7–4–2	L
20	November 23	Ottawa Senators	6 – 2	7–7–4–2	W
21	November 25	@ Tampa Bay Lightning	2 – 0	8–7–4–2	W
22	November 26	@ Florida Panthers	3 – 3 OT	8–7–5–2	T
23	November 28	@ Pittsburgh Penguins	4 – 1	9–7–5–2	W
24	November 30	Toronto Maple Leafs	4 – 2	9–8–5–2	L

December: 6–5–0–1 (home: 2–2–0–1; road: 4–3–0–0)

Game	Date	Opponent	Score	Record	Recap
25	December 2	@ Toronto Maple Leafs	5 – 4	9–9–5–2	L
26	December 4	@ New York Islanders	4 – 2	10–9–5–2	W
27	December 7	Tampa Bay Lightning	3 – 2	10–10–5–2	L
28	December 10	Montreal Canadiens	2 – 1	10–11–5–2	L
29	December 12	@ Buffalo Sabres	3 – 1	11–11–5–2	W
30	December 13	@ Toronto Maple Leafs	3 – 1	11–12–5–2	L
31	December 18	New York Islanders	4 – 3	12–12–5–2	W
32	December 20	@ Ottawa Senators	3 – 1	12–13–5–2	L
33	December 22	Boston Bruins	4 – 2	13–13–5–2	W
34	December 26	Toronto Maple Leafs	6 – 5 OT	13–13–5–3	OTL
35	December 29	@ Phoenix Coyotes	3 – 2 OT	14–13–5–3	W
36	December 30	@ Los Angeles Kings	3 – 2 OT	15–13–5–3	W

January: 4–10–2–1 (home: 2–5–1–1; road: 2–5–1–0)

Game	Date	Opponent	Score	Record	Recap
37	January 1	@ St. Louis Blues	5 – 4	15–14–5–3	L
38	January 3	@ Pittsburgh Penguins	4 – 1	16–14–5–3	W
39	January 5	Calgary Flames	5 – 0	16–15–5–3	L
40	January 8	@ Carolina Hurricanes	3 – 2	16–16–5–3	L
41	January 10	@ New York Islanders	3 – 2	17–16–5–3	W
42	January 11	Tampa Bay Lightning	2 – 1 OT	17–16–5–4	OTL
43	January 13	New York Islanders	4 – 1	18–16–5–4	W
44	January 15	New Jersey Devils	3 – 3 OT	18–16–6–4	T
45	January 17	@ Montreal Canadiens	2 – 2 OT	18–16–7–4	T
46	January 19	@ Boston Bruins	5 – 2	18–17–7–4	L
47	January 20	Boston Bruins	4 – 1	18–18–7–4	L
48	January 22	Philadelphia Flyers	4 – 2	18–19–7–4	L
49	January 24	@ Ottawa Senators	9 – 1	18–20–7–4	L
50	January 26	Florida Panthers	5 – 2	19–20–7–4	W
51	January 28	Washington Capitals	2 – 1	19–21–7–4	L
52	January 30	Buffalo Sabres	3 – 1	19–22–7–4	L
53	January 31	@ Buffalo Sabres	3 – 1	19–23–7–4	L

February: 4–7–0–1 (home: 2–5–0–0; road: 2–2–0–1)

Game	Date	Opponent	Score	Record	Recap
54	February 2	Vancouver Canucks	4 – 3	20–23–7–4	W
55	February 4	Minnesota Wild	4 – 3	20–24–7–4	L
56	February 11	@ New Jersey Devils	3 – 1	21–24–7–4	W
57	February 12	Philadelphia Flyers	2 – 1	21–25–7–4	L
58	February 14	@ Philadelphia Flyers	6 – 2	21–26–7–4	L
59	February 16	Ottawa Senators	4 – 1	21–27–7–4	L
60	February 19	New York Islanders	6 – 2	22–27–7–4	W
61	February 21	New Jersey Devils	7 – 3	22–28–7–4	L
62	February 23	Montreal Canadiens	4 – 1	22–29–7–4	L
63	February 26	@ New York Islanders	6 – 3	23–29–7–4	W
64	February 28	@ Nashville Predators	2 – 1 OT	23–29–7–5	OTL
65	February 29	@ Atlanta Thrashers	3 – 2	23–30–7–5	L

March: 3–10–0–3 (home: 1–6–0–0; road: 2–4–0–3)

Game	Date	Opponent	Score	Record	Recap
66	March 2	Atlanta Thrashers	4 – 3	23–31–7–5	L
67	March 4	@ Boston Bruins	3 – 1	23–32–7–5	L
68	March 5	Washington Capitals	3 – 2	24–32–7–5	W
69	March 7	Pittsburgh Penguins	7 – 4	24–33–7–5	L
70	March 9	@ Atlanta Thrashers	2 – 0	25–33–7–5	W
71	March 12	@ Tampa Bay Lightning	5 – 2	25–34–7–5	L
72	March 13	@ Florida Panthers	3 – 2 OT	25–34–7–6	OTL
73	March 15	New Jersey Devils	3 – 1	25–35–7–6	L
74	March 18	@ Washington Capitals	4 – 3 OT	25–35–7–7	OTL
75	March 20	@ Philadelphia Flyers	3 – 0	25–36–7–7	L
76	March 21	@ Pittsburgh Penguins	4 – 3 OT	25–36–7–8	OTL
77	March 23	Pittsburgh Penguins	5 – 2	25–37–7–8	L
78	March 25	Nashville Predators	4 – 2	25–38–7–8	L
79	March 27	@ Philadelphia Flyers	3 – 1	26–38–7–8	W
80	March 30	@ New Jersey Devils	5 – 0	26–39–7–8	L
81	March 31	Buffalo Sabres	4 – 3	26–40–7–8	L

April: 1–0–0–0 (home: 0–0–0–0; road: 1–0–0–0)

Game	Date	Opponent	Score	Record	Recap
82	April 3	@ Washington Capitals	3 – 2 OT	27–40–7–8	W

Legend: W Win (2 points) L Loss (0 points) T Tie (1 point) OTL Overtime loss (1 point)

== Player statistics ==
=== Scoring ===
- Position abbreviations: C = Center; D = Defense; G = Goaltender; LW = Left wing; RW = Right wing
- † = Joined team via a transaction (e.g., trade, waivers, signing) during the season. Stats reflect time with the Rangers only.
- ‡ = Left team via a transaction (e.g., trade, waivers, release) during the season. Stats reflect time with the Rangers only.

No.	Player	Pos	Regular season					
No.	Player	Pos	GP	G	A	Pts	+/-	PIM
16	Bobby Holik	C	82	25	31	56	4	96
11	Mark Messier	C	76	18	25	43	3	42
27	Alexei Kovalev‡	RW	66	13	29	42	−5	54
26	Martin Rucinsky‡	LW	69	13	29	42	13	62
2	Brian Leetch‡	D	57	13	23	36	−5	24
36	Matthew Barnaby‡	RW	69	12	20	32	15	120
88	Eric Lindros	C	39	10	22	32	7	60
93	Petr Nedved‡	C	65	14	17	31	−9	42
68	Jaromir Jagr†	RW	31	15	14	29	−1	12
37	Jan Hlavac	LW	72	5	21	26	−8	16
3	Tom Poti	D	67	10	14	24	−1	47
17	Chris Simon‡	LW	65	14	9	23	14	225
23	Vladimir Malakhov‡	D	56	3	15	18	−5	53
22	Anson Carter‡	RW	43	10	7	17	−12	14
29	Boris Mironov	D	75	3	13	16	1	86
4	Greg de Vries‡	D	53	3	12	15	12	37
21	Jamie Lundmark	C	56	2	8	10	−8	33
6	Darius Kasparaitis	D	44	1	9	10	11	48
74	Joel Bouchard	D	28	1	7	8	2	10
39	Dan LaCouture	LW	59	5	2	7	−13	82
51	Fedor Tyutin	D	25	2	5	7	−4	14
41	Jed Ortmeyer	RW	58	2	4	6	−10	16
44	Josh Green†	LW	14	3	2	5	0	8
20	Jozef Balej†	RW	13	1	4	5	0	4
22	Thomas Pock†	D	6	2	2	4	−4	0
23	Karel Rachunek†	D	12	1	3	4	−9	4
47	Mike Green†	C	13	1	2	3	0	2
28	Dominic Moore	C	5	0	3	3	0	0
5	Dale Purinton	D	40	1	1	2	−9	117
10	Sandy McCarthy†	RW	13	1	0	1	−8	2
25 (Note: Murray originally wore number 10 prior to McCarthy being acquired.)	Garth Murray	C	20	1	0	1	−5	24
15	Chad Wiseman	LW	4	1	0	1	−1	0
34	Jason LaBarbera	G	4	0	1	1		2
18	Cory Larose	C	7	0	1	1	−2	4
24	Chris McAllister†	D	12	0	1	1	−4	12
30	Mike Dunham	G	57	0	0	0		0
22	Benoit Dusablon	C	3	0	0	0	−1	2
12	Ken Gernander	RW	2	0	0	0	−1	2
25	Paul Healey‡	RW	4	0	0	0	0	0
38	Bryce Lampman	D	8	0	0	0	−4	0
43	Jason MacDonald†	RW	4	0	0	0	−1	19
40	Jussi Markkanen‡	G	26	0	0	0		0
33	Jamie McLennan†	G	4	0	0	0		0
28	Lawrence Nycholat	D	9	0	0	0	−2	6
24	Jamie Pushor†	D	7	0	0	0	−3	0
20	Pascal Rheaume†‡	C	17	0	0	0	−3	5
13	Richard Scott	LW	5	0	0	0	0	23
18	Mike Siklenka‡	RW	1	0	0	0	0	0
53	Layne Ulmer	C	1	0	0	0	−1	0
45	Steve Valiquette†	G	2	0	0	0		0

=== Goaltending ===
No.	Player	Regular season									
No.	Player	GP	W	L	T	SA	GA	GAA	SV%	SO	TOI
30	Mike Dunham	57	16	30	5	1522	159	3.03	.896	2	3148
40	Jussi Markkanen‡	26	8	12	1	611	53	2.56	.913	2	1244
33	Jamie McLennan†	4	1	3	0	97	12	2.96	.876	0	243
34	Jason LaBarbera	4	1	2	0	91	16	4.85	.824	0	198
45	Steve Valiquette†	2	1	1	0	71	6	3.00	.915	0	119

== Awards and records ==
=== Awards ===
Type	Award/honor	Recipient	Ref
League (annual)	Lester Patrick Trophy	John Davidson	
League (in-season)	NHL All-Star Game selection	Jaromir Jagr	
League (in-season)	NHL All-Star Game selection	Mark Messier	
League (in-season)	NHL Offensive Player of the Week	Martin Rucinsky (November 24)	
League (in-season)	NHL Offensive Player of the Week	Mark Messier (January 5)	
Team	Ceil Saidel Memorial Award	Mark Messier	
Team	"Crumb Bum" Award	Matthew Barnaby	
Team	Frank Boucher Trophy	Eric Lindros	
Team	Good Guy Award	Eric Lindros	
Team	Lars-Erik Sjoberg Award	Dominic Moore	
Team	Players' Player Award	Brian Leetch	
Team	Rangers MVP	Bobby Holik	
Team	Rookie of the Year	Jed Ortmeyer	
Team	Steven McDonald Extra Effort Award	Jed Ortmeyer	

=== Milestones ===
Milestone	Player	Date	Ref
First game	Dominic Moore	November 1, 2003	
First game	Jed Ortmeyer	November 15, 2003	
First game	Jason MacDonald	December 12, 2003	
First game	Lawrence Nycholat	January 20, 2004	
First game	Garth Murray	January 30, 2004	
First game	Fedor Tyutin	February 14, 2004	
First game	Cory Larose	February 16, 2004	
First game	Benoit Dusablon	March 4, 2004	
First game	Bryce Lampman	March 9, 2004	
First game	Thomas Pock	March 23, 2004	
First game	Layne Ulmer	April 3, 2004	
1,000th game played	Jaromir Jagr	January 30, 2004	
1,000th game played	Bobby Holík	February 14, 2004	

== Transactions ==
The Rangers were involved in the following transactions from June 10, 2003, the day after the deciding game of the 2003 Stanley Cup Finals, through June 7, 2004, the day of the deciding game of the 2004 Stanley Cup Finals.

=== Trades ===
Date	Details		Ref
June 21, 2003	To San Jose Sharks: 2nd-round pick in 2003	To New York Rangers: Boston's 2nd-round pick in 2003; 3rd-round pick in 2003	
June 22, 2003	To San Jose Sharks: Previous considerations	To New York Rangers: 6th-round pick in 2003	
June 30, 2003	To Edmonton Oilers: Rights to Brian Leetch	To New York Rangers: Jussi Markkanen; 4th-round pick in 2004	
June 30, 2003	To San Jose Sharks: Rights to Mark Messier	To New York Rangers: Future considerations (Note: 4th-round pick in 2004)	
August 12, 2003	To San Jose Sharks: Nils Ekman	To New York Rangers: Chad Wiseman	
January 23, 2004	To Washington Capitals: Anson Carter	To New York Rangers: Jaromir Jagr	
January 23, 2004	To Columbus Blue Jackets: 8th-round pick in 2004	To New York Rangers: Jamie Pushor	
March 2, 2004	To Montreal Canadiens: Alexei Kovalev	To New York Rangers: Jozef Balej; 2nd-round pick in 2004	
March 3, 2004	To Edmonton Oilers: Jussi Markkanen; Petr Nedved	To New York Rangers: Steve Valiquette; Rights to Dwight Helminen; 2nd-round pick in 2004	
March 3, 2004	To Toronto Maple Leafs: Brian Leetch; Conditional draft pick	To New York Rangers: Maxim Kondratiev; Rights to Jarkko Immonen; 1st-round pick in 2004; 2nd-round pick in 2005	
March 6, 2004	To Calgary Flames: Chris Simon; 7th-round pick in 2004	To New York Rangers: Blair Betts; Jamie McLennan; Rights to Greg Moore	
March 8, 2004	To Philadelphia Flyers: Vladimir Malakhov	To New York Rangers: Rights to Rick Kozak; 2nd-round pick in 2005	
March 8, 2004	To Colorado Avalanche: Matthew Barnaby; 3rd-round pick in 2004	To New York Rangers: Chris McAllister; Rights to David Liffiton; 2nd-round pick in 2004	
March 9, 2004	To Ottawa Senators: Greg de Vries	To New York Rangers: Alexandre Giroux; Karel Rachunek	
March 9, 2004	To Florida Panthers: Paul Healey	To New York Rangers: Jeff Paul	
March 9, 2004	To Vancouver Canucks: Martin Rucinsky	To New York Rangers: Martin Grenier; Rights to R. J. Umberger	

=== Players acquired ===
Date	Player	Former team	Term	Via	Ref
July 14, 2003	Greg de Vries	Colorado Avalanche		Free agency	
July 25, 2003	Chris Simon	Chicago Blackhawks		Free agency	
July 28, 2003	Paul Healey	Toronto Maple Leafs		Free agency	
July 30, 2003	Brian Leetch	Edmonton Oilers		Free agency	
August 21, 2003	John Jakopin	San Jose Sharks		Free agency	
August 28, 2003	Jan Hlavac	Carolina Hurricanes		Free agency	
August 28, 2003	Martin Rucinsky	St. Louis Blues		Free agency	
September 5, 2003	Mark Messier	San Jose Sharks		Free agency	
September 30, 2003	Jeff Heerema	Carolina Hurricanes		Waivers	
September 30, 2003	Shawn Heins	Atlanta Thrashers		Waivers	
October 3, 2003	Joel Bouchard	Buffalo Sabres		Waiver draft	
October 3, 2003	Sheldon Keefe	Tampa Bay Lightning		Waiver draft	
October 3, 2003	Mike Siklenka	Philadelphia Flyers		Waiver draft	
October 22, 2003	Pascal Rheaume	New Jersey Devils		Free agency	
November 23, 2003	Phil Osaer	Hartford Wolf Pack (AHL)		Free agency	
December 11, 2003	Jason MacDonald	Hartford Wolf Pack (AHL)		Free agency	
January 10, 2004	Jeff Heerema	St. Louis Blues		Waivers	
March 6, 2004	Josh Green	Calgary Flames		Waivers	
March 9, 2004	Mike Green	Florida Panthers		Waivers	
March 9, 2004	Sandy McCarthy	Boston Bruins		Waivers	
March 23, 2004	Thomas Pock	University of Massachusetts Amherst (HE)		Free agency	

=== Players lost ===
Date	Player	New team	Via (Note: In parentheses is the player's free agency group on July 1 if applicable.)	Ref
July 1, 2003	Mike Wilson	Phoenix Coyotes (Note: Wilson signed with Phoenix on September 23.)	Buyout	
July 22, 2003	Vladimir Chebaturkin	Ak Bars Kazan (RSL)	Free agency (VI)	
July 22, 2003	Ted Donato	Boston Bruins	Free agency (III)	
August 6, 2003	John Tripp	Los Angeles Kings	Free agency (VI)	
August 12, 2003	Sandy McCarthy	Boston Bruins	Free agency (III)	
September 4, 2003	Mike Richter		Retirement	
September 8, 2003	Ales Pisa	Lokomotiv Yaroslavl (RSL)	Free agency (II) (Note: New York retained Pisa's NHL rights through the 2005–06 season.)	
September 23, 2003	Dixon Ward	SC Rapperswil-Jona (NLA)	Free agency (III)	
October 3, 2003	Jeff Heerema	St. Louis Blues	Waiver draft	
October 3, 2003	Shawn Heins	Atlanta Thrashers	Waiver draft	
October 3, 2003	Ronald Petrovicky	Atlanta Thrashers	Waiver draft	
October 17, 2003	Billy Tibbetts	San Diego Gulls (ECHL)	Free agency (UFA)	
October 24, 2003	Sheldon Keefe	Tampa Bay Lightning	Waivers	
November 5, 2003	Mike Siklenka	Philadelphia Flyers	Waivers	
November 19, 2003	Dave Karpa	Wilkes-Barre/Scranton Penguins (AHL)	Free agency (III)	
January 16, 2004	Sylvain Lefebvre	SC Bern (NLA)	Free agency (III)	
January 29, 2004	Pascal Rheaume	St. Louis Blues	Waivers	

=== Signings ===
Date	Player	Term	Contract type	Ref
June 30, 2003	Dan LaCouture		Re-signing	
June 30, 2003	Ronald Petrovicky		Re-signing	
July 17, 2003	Jussi Markkanen		Re-signing	
July 24, 2003	Richard Scott		Re-signing	
August 12, 2003	Tom Poti	2-year	Arbitration award	
August 13, 2003	Alexei Kovalev		Re-signing	
August 18, 2003	Anson Carter	1-year	Re-signing	
September 3, 2003	Boris Mironov		Re-signing	
September 8, 2003	Dominic Moore		Entry-level	
September 12, 2003	Jason LaBarbera		Re-signing	
September 12, 2003	Lawrence Nycholat		Re-signing	
June 7, 2004	Ryan Hollweg		Entry-level	

== Draft picks ==
New York's picks at the 2003 NHL entry draft in Nashville, Tennessee, at the Gaylord Entertainment Center.

Round	#	Player	Pos	Nationality	College/Junior/Club team (League)
1	12	Hugh Jessiman	RW	United States	Dartmouth College (ECAC)
2	50^{[a]}	Ivan Baranka	D	Slovakia	Spartak Dubnica Jr. (Slovakia Jr.)
3	75^{[b]}	Ken Roche	C	United States	St. Sebastian's School (USHS–MA)
4	122^{[c]}	Corey Potter	D	United States	Michigan State University (CCHA)
5	149	Nigel Dawes	LW	Canada	Kootenay Ice (WHL)
6	176^{[d]}	Ivan Dornic	C	Slovakia	Slovan Bratislava (Slovak Extraliga)
6	179^{[e]}	Philippe Furrer	D	Switzerland	SC Bern (NLA)
6	180^{[f]}	Chris Holt	G	Canada	US National Team Development Program (USA)
7	209	Dylan Reese	D	United States	Pittsburgh Forge (NAHL)
8	243	Jan Marek	F	Czech Republic	Oceláři Třinec (Czech Extraliga)

Draft notes

- The New York Rangers' second-round pick went to the San Jose Sharks as the result of a June 21, 2003 trade that sent a 2003 second-round pick and a 2003 third-round pick to the Rangers in exchange for this pick.
- ^{a} The San Jose Sharks' second-round pick went to the New York Rangers as a result of a June 21, 2003 trade that sent a 2003 second round pick to the Sharks in exchange for a 2003 third-round pick and this pick.
- ^{b} The San Jose Sharks' third-round pick went to the New York Rangers as a result of a June 21, 2003 trade that sent a 2003 second round pick to the Sharks in exchange for a 2003 second-round pick and this pick.
- The New York Rangers' third-round pick went to the Philadelphia Flyers as the result of an August 20, 2001 trade that sent Eric Lindros to the Rangers in exchange for Kim Johnsson, Pavel Brendl, Jan Hlavac and this pick.
- The New York Rangers' fourth-round pick went to the Florida Panthers as the result of a March 18, 2002 trade that sent Pavel Bure and a 2002 second-round pick to the Rangers in exchange for Igor Ulanov, Filip Novak, a 2002 first round pick, a 2002 second round pick and this pick.
- ^{c} The Edmonton Oilers' fourth-round pick went to the New York Rangers as a result of a June 30, 2002 trade that sent Mike Richter to the Oilers in exchange for this pick.
- ^{d} The Calgary Flames' sixth-round pick went to the New York Rangers as a result of a January 22, 2003 trade that sent Mike Mottau to the Flames in exchange for a 2004 sixth-round pick and this pick.
- ^{e} The San Jose Sharks' sixth-round pick (originally New York Rangers) went to the New York Rangers as a result of a June 22, 2003 trade that sent previous considerations to the Sharks in exchange for this pick.
- ^{f} The Los Angeles Kings' sixth-round pick went to the New York Rangers as a result of a July 16, 2002 trade that sent Derek Armstrong to the Kings in exchange for this conditional pick.
- The New York Rangers' ninth-round pick went to the Pittsburgh Penguins as the result of a June 23, 2002 trade that sent Krysztof Oliwa to the Rangers in exchange for future considerations (this pick).
