= 2003–04 Pittsburgh Penguins season =

NHL team season

2003–04 Pittsburgh Penguins
- Division: 5th Atlantic
- Conference: 15th Eastern
- 2003–04 record: 23–47–8–4
- Home record: 13–22–6–0
- Road record: 10–25–2–4
- Goals for: 190
- Goals against: 303

Team information
- General manager: Craig Patrick
- Coach: Eddie Olczyk
- Captain: Mario Lemieux
- Alternate captains: Marc Bergevin (Oct.–Mar.); Kelly Buchberger (Nov.–Apr.); Martin Straka (Oct.–Nov.)
- Arena: Mellon Arena
- Average attendance: 11,877
- Minor league affiliates: Wilkes-Barre/Scranton Penguins; Wheeling Nailers

Team leaders
- Goals: Ryan Malone (22)
- Assists: Dick Tarnstrom (36)
- Points: Dick Tarnstrom (52)
- Penalty minutes: Brooks Orpik (127)
- Plus/minus: Rob Scuderi (2)
- Wins: Sebastien Caron (9)
- Goals against average: Jean-Sebastien Aubin (2.98)

The 2003–04 Pittsburgh Penguins season was the team's 37th season of play. For the third season in a row, the club placed last in the Atlantic Division and did not qualify for the Stanley Cup playoffs for the third year in a row for the first time since the 1985–86 season and the 1987–88 season. In an 18-game losing streak, they went 0–17–1 (one overtime loss). In the first 62 games, they were 11–42–5–4 for 31 points. In their final 20 games, they were 12–5–3–0, ultimately finishing with a 23–47–8–4 record for a last place finish in the conference for the first time since the 1984–85 season and in the NHL for the first time since the 1983–84 season. Their record losing streak would not be matched until the pandemic-shortened 2020–21 season by the Buffalo Sabres. By then, tie games would be out of the picture.

== Offseason ==
Head coach Rick Kehoe was fired on April 15, 2003. Team broadcaster and former Penguins player Eddie Olczyk was hired as his replacement on June 11.

== Regular season ==
The Penguins struggled defensively, finishing 30th overall in the NHL in goals allowed, with 303. They struggled in short-handed situations, allowing the most power-play goals in the League, with 84, and finishing 30th overall in penalty-kill percentage, at 77.24%. Furthermore, they allowed the most short-handed goals in the NHL, with 15.

=== Final standings ===
Atlantic Division
No.	CR		GP	W	L	T	OTL	GF	GA	PTS
1	3	**Philadelphia Flyers**	82	40	21	15	6	229	186	101
2	6	**New Jersey Devils**	82	43	25	12	2	213	164	100
3	8	**New York Islanders**	82	38	29	11	4	237	210	91
4	13	New York Rangers	82	27	40	7	8	206	250	69
5	15	Pittsburgh Penguins	82	23	47	8	4	190	303	58

Note: CR = Conference rank; GP = Games played; W = Wins; L = Losses; T = Ties; OTL = Overtime loss; GF = Goals for; GA = Goals against; Pts = Points
Bolded teams qualified for the playoffs.

Eastern Conference
R		Div	GP	W	L	T	OTL	GF	GA	Pts
**1**	**Z-** Tampa Bay Lightning	**SE**	**82**	**46**	**22**	**8**	**6**	**245**	**192**	106
**2**	**Y-** Boston Bruins	**NE**	**82**	**41**	**19**	**15**	**7**	**209**	**188**	104
**3**	**Y-** Philadelphia Flyers	**AT**	**82**	**40**	**21**	**15**	**6**	**209**	**188**	101
**4**	**X-** Toronto Maple Leafs	**NE**	**82**	**45**	**24**	**10**	**3**	**242**	**204**	103
**5**	**X-** Ottawa Senators	**NE**	**82**	**43**	**23**	**10**	**6**	**262**	**189**	102
**6**	**X-** New Jersey Devils	**AT**	**82**	**43**	**25**	**12**	**2**	**213**	**164**	100
**7**	**X-** Montreal Canadiens	**NE**	**82**	**41**	**30**	**7**	**4**	**208**	**192**	93
**8**	**X-** New York Islanders	**AT**	**82**	**38**	**29**	**11**	**4**	**237**	**210**	91
8.5
9	Buffalo Sabres	NE	82	37	34	7	4	220	221	85
10	Atlanta Thrashers	SE	82	33	37	8	4	214	243	78
11	Carolina Hurricanes	SE	82	28	34	14	6	172	209	76
12	Florida Panthers	SE	82	28	35	15	4	188	221	75
13	New York Rangers	AT	82	27	40	7	8	206	250	69
14	Washington Capitals	SE	82	23	46	10	3	186	253	59
15	Pittsburgh Penguins	AT	82	23	47	8	4	190	303	58

Divisions: AT – Atlantic, NE – Northeast, SE – Southeast

Z – Clinched conference; Y – Clinched division; X – Clinched playoff spot

== Schedule and results ==
2003–04 regular season
October: 2–4–3–0 (home: 1–2–2–0; road: 1–2–1–0), 7 Points

#	Oct	Visitor	Score	Home	Location	Record	Points	Recap
1	10	Los Angeles Kings	3–0	Pittsburgh Penguins	Civic Arena (16,986)	0–1–0–0	0	L
2	11	Pittsburgh Penguins	3–3 OT	Philadelphia Flyers	Wells Fargo Center (19,035)	0–1–1–0	1	T
3	16	Pittsburgh Penguins	1–4	Montreal Canadiens	Bell Centre (18,859)	0–2–1–0	1	L
4	18	Detroit Red Wings	3–4	Pittsburgh Penguins	Civic Arena (13,421)	1–2–1–0	3	W
5	22	Carolina Hurricanes	1–1 OT	Pittsburgh Penguins	Civic Arena (10,425)	1–2–2–0	4	T
6	24	New Jersey Devils	2–1	Pittsburgh Penguins	Civic Arena (11,281)	1–3–2–0	4	L
7	25	Pittsburgh Penguins	2–7	New York Islanders	Nassau Coliseum (11,746)	1–4–2–0	4	L
8	29	New York Islanders	4–4 OT	Pittsburgh Penguins	Civic Arena (10,377)	1–4–3–0	5	T
9	30	Pittsburgh Penguins	1–0	Chicago Blackhawks	United Center (15,121)	2–4–3–0	7	W

November: 3–8–1–1 (home: 2–3–1–0; road: 1–5–0–1), 8 Points

#	Nov	Visitor	Score	Home	Location	Record	Points	Recap
10	1	Boston Bruins	2–3 OT	Pittsburgh Penguins	Civic Arena (10,226)	3–4–3–0	9	W
11	4	Pittsburgh Penguins	2–4	Toronto Maple Leafs	Air Canada Centre (19,237)	3–5–3–0	9	L
12	7	Pittsburgh Penguins	3–6	Florida Panthers	BB&T Center (18,161)	3–6–3–0	9	L
13	8	Pittsburgh Penguins	0–9	Tampa Bay Lightning	Amalie Arena (18,262)	3–7–3–0	9	L
14	12	Pittsburgh Penguins	2–6	New York Rangers	Madison Square Garden (17,960)	3–8–3–0	9	L
15	14	Pittsburgh Penguins	2–1 OT	Buffalo Sabres	First Niagara Center (18,002)	4–8–3–0	11	W
16	15	Florida Panthers	3–2	Pittsburgh Penguins	Civic Arena (11,004)	4–9–3–0	11	L
17	19	Minnesota Wild	6–2	Pittsburgh Penguins	Civic Arena (10,957)	4–10–3–0	11	L
18	21	Pittsburgh Penguins	1–2 OT	New Jersey Devils	Izod Center (16,810)	4–10–3–1	12	OTL
19	22	Ottawa Senators	1–2 OT	Pittsburgh Penguins	Civic Arena (11,233)	5–10–3–1	14	W
20	26	Philadelphia Flyers	1–1 OT	Pittsburgh Penguins	Civic Arena (11,014)	5–10–4–1	15	T
21	28	New York Rangers	4–1	Pittsburgh Penguins	Civic Arena (15,908)	5–11–4–1	15	L
22	29	Pittsburgh Penguins	3–4	Carolina Hurricanes	PNC Arena (14,881)	5–12–4–1	15	L

December: 4–8–1–2 (home: 4–3–0–0; road: 0–5–1–2), 11 Points

#	Dec	Visitor	Score	Home	Location	Record	Points	Recap
23	1	Atlanta Thrashers	3–4	Pittsburgh Penguins	Civic Arena (9,576)	6–12–4–1	17	W
24	3	Pittsburgh Penguins	2–5	Philadelphia Flyers	Wells Fargo Center (18,972)	6–13–4–1	17	L
25	6	Pittsburgh Penguins	3–4	Edmonton Oilers	Skyreach Centre (16,839)	6–14–4–1	17	L
26	7	Pittsburgh Penguins	1–6	Calgary Flames	Scotiabank Saddledome (15,009)	6–15–4–1	17	L
27	9	Pittsburgh Penguins	3–4 OT	Vancouver Canucks	Rogers Arena (18,630)	6–15–4–2	18	OTL
28	12	Pittsburgh Penguins	3–6	Atlanta Thrashers	Philips Arena (15,039)	6–16–4–2	18	L
29	13	Columbus Blue Jackets	3–5	Pittsburgh Penguins	Civic Arena (11,989)	7–16–4–2	20	W
30	16	Buffalo Sabres	1–2	Pittsburgh Penguins	Civic Arena (10,554)	8–16–4–2	22	W
31	18	Pittsburgh Penguins	1–2 OT	Carolina Hurricanes	PNC Arena (11,028)	8–16–4–3	23	OTL
32	20	Atlanta Thrashers	7–4	Pittsburgh Penguins	Civic Arena (13,683)	8–17–4–3	23	L
33	22	Pittsburgh Penguins	1–4	Montreal Canadiens	Bell Centre (21,273)	8–18–4–3	23	L
34	26	Pittsburgh Penguins	3–3 OT	Ottawa Senators	Canadian Tire Centre (18,316)	8–18–5–3	24	T
35	27	New Jersey Devils	2–0	Pittsburgh Penguins	Civic Arena (12,139)	8–19–5–3	24	L
36	29	Chicago Blackhawks	0–1	Pittsburgh Penguins	Civic Arena (16,120)	9–19–5–3	26	W
37	31	New York Islanders	6–1	Pittsburgh Penguins	Civic Arena (11,939)	9–20–5–3	26	L

January: 2–14–0–0 (home: 0–8–0–0; road: 2–6–0–0), 4 Points

#	Jan	Visitor	Score	Home	Location	Record	Points	Recap
38	1	Pittsburgh Penguins	2–3	Nashville Predators	Bridgestone Arena (16,238)	9–21–5–3	26	L
39	3	New York Rangers	4–1	Pittsburgh Penguins	Civic Arena (10,078)	9–22–5–3	26	L
40	5	Toronto Maple Leafs	5–0	Pittsburgh Penguins	Civic Arena (10,216)	9–23–5–3	26	L
41	7	Pittsburgh Penguins	4–2	New Jersey Devils	Izod Center (11,948)	10–23–5–3	28	W
42	8	Pittsburgh Penguins	1–3	Boston Bruins	TD Garden (12,914)	10–24–5–3	28	L
43	10	Montreal Canadiens	8–0	Pittsburgh Penguins	Civic Arena (15,286)	10–25–5–3	28	L
44	12	Pittsburgh Penguins	2–1	Philadelphia Flyers	Wells Fargo Center (19,542)	11–25–5–3	30	W
45	13	Tampa Bay Lightning	3–1	Pittsburgh Penguins	Civic Arena (10,039)	11–26–5–3	30	L
46	16	Pittsburgh Penguins	2–4	Minnesota Wild	Xcel Energy Center (18,568)	11–27–5–3	30	L
47	18	Pittsburgh Penguins	3–4	Washington Capitals	Verizon Center (16,168)	11–28–5–3	30	L
48	20	New Jersey Devils	3–0	Pittsburgh Penguins	Civic Arena (10,146)	11–29–5–3	30	L
49	22	Pittsburgh Penguins	5–6	Ottawa Senators	Canadian Tire Centre (16,777)	11–30–5–3	30	L
50	24	Colorado Avalanche	5–3	Pittsburgh Penguins	Civic Arena (16,704)	11–31–5–3	30	L
51	27	Tampa Bay Lightning	6–2	Pittsburgh Penguins	Civic Arena (9,391)	11–32–5–3	30	L
52	29	Pittsburgh Penguins	1–5	Tampa Bay Lightning	Amalie Arena (15,847)	11–33–5–3	30	L
53	31	Philadelphia Flyers	5–3	Pittsburgh Penguins	Civic Arena (12,965)	11–34–5–3	30	L

February: 2–9–0–1 (home: 0–5–0–0; road: 2–4–0–1), 5 Points

#	Feb	Visitor	Score	Home	Location	Record	Points	Recap
54	1	Pittsburgh Penguins	1–4	Boston Bruins	TD Garden (15,692)	11–35–5–3	30	L
55	3	Montreal Canadiens	4–3	Pittsburgh Penguins	Civic Arena (10,041)	11–36–5–3	30	L
56	10	Boston Bruins	6–3	Pittsburgh Penguins	Civic Arena (10,741)	11–37–5–3	30	L
57	12	Pittsburgh Penguins	1–5	Florida Panthers	BB&T Center (15,863)	11–38–5–3	30	L
58	14	Pittsburgh Penguins	2–3 OT	St. Louis Blues	Scottrade Center (19,812)	11–38–5–4	31	OTL
59	16	Toronto Maple Leafs	8–4	Pittsburgh Penguins	Civic Arena (10,527)	11–39–5–4	31	L
60	18	Pittsburgh Penguins	3–4	New York Islanders	Nassau Coliseum (13,570)	11–40–5–4	31	L
61	20	Florida Panthers	2–0	Pittsburgh Penguins	Civic Arena (11,917)	11–41–5–4	31	L
62	22	Ottawa Senators	6–3	Pittsburgh Penguins	Civic Arena (11,780)	11–42–5–4	31	L
63	25	Pittsburgh Penguins	4–3 OT	Phoenix Coyotes	America West Arena (14,712)	12–42–5–4	33	W
64	27	Pittsburgh Penguins	2–4	San Jose Sharks	SAP Center at San Jose (17,496)	12–43–5–4	33	L
65	29	Pittsburgh Penguins	3–2 OT	New York Islanders	Nassau Coliseum (15,218)	13–43–5–4	35	W

March: 8–4–3–0 (home: 5–1–3–0; road: 3–3–0–0), 19 Points

#	Mar	Visitor	Score	Home	Location	Record	Points	Recap
66	2	New York Islanders	3–3 OT	Pittsburgh Penguins	Civic Arena (10,821)	13–43–6–4	36	T
67	4	Nashville Predators	9–4	Pittsburgh Penguins	Civic Arena (9,507)	13–44–6–4	36	L
68	6	Mighty Ducks of Anaheim	1–2	Pittsburgh Penguins	Civic Arena (14,286)	14–44–6–4	38	W
69	7	Pittsburgh Penguins	7–4	New York Rangers	Madison Square Garden (18,200)	15–44–6–4	40	W
70	9	Dallas Stars	0–4	Pittsburgh Penguins	Civic Arena (10,302)	16–44–6–4	42	W
71	11	Pittsburgh Penguins	3–2	Toronto Maple Leafs	Air Canada Centre (19,411)	17–44–6–4	44	W
72	14	Philadelphia Flyers	3–3 OT	Pittsburgh Penguins	Civic Arena (10,907)	17–44–7–4	45	T
73	16	Washington Capitals	1–4	Pittsburgh Penguins	Civic Arena (10,982)	18–44–7–4	47	W
74	17	Pittsburgh Penguins	1–6	New Jersey Devils	Izod Center (13,239)	18–45–7–4	47	L
75	19	Carolina Hurricanes	3–4 OT	Pittsburgh Penguins	Civic Arena (10,098)	19–45–7–4	49	W
76	21	New York Rangers	3–4 OT	Pittsburgh Penguins	Civic Arena (12,307)	20–45–7–4	51	W
77	23	Pittsburgh Penguins	5–2	New York Rangers	Madison Square Garden (17,902)	21–45–7–4	53	W
78	26	Pittsburgh Penguins	1–5	Buffalo Sabres	First Niagara Center (18,333)	21–46–7–4	53	L
79	27	Buffalo Sabres	2–2 OT	Pittsburgh Penguins	Civic Arena (12,964)	21–46–8–4	54	T
80	30	Pittsburgh Penguins	2–4	Washington Capitals	Verizon Center (13,417)	21–47–8–4	54	L

April: 2–0–0–0 (home: 1–0–0–0; road: 1–0–0–0), 4 Points

#	Apr	Visitor	Score	Home	Location	Record	Points	Recap
81	2	Pittsburgh Penguins	3–2	Atlanta Thrashers	Philips Arena (18,854)	22–47–8–4	56	W
82	4	Washington Capitals	3–4	Pittsburgh Penguins	Civic Arena (16,124)	23–47–8–4	58	W

Legend: W Win (2 points) L Loss (0 points) T Tie (1 point) OTL Overtime loss (1 point)

== Player statistics ==
Skaters

Regular season
Player	GP	G	A	Pts	+/−	PIM
Dick Tarnstrom	80	16	36	52	-37	38
Aleksey Morozov	75	16	34	50	-24	24
Ryan Malone	81	22	21	43	-23	64
Milan Kraft	66	19	21	40	-22	18
Rico Fata	73	16	18	34	-46	54
Konstantin Koltsov	82	9	20	29	-30	30
Ric Jackman^{†}	25	7	17	24	-5	14
Tomas Surovy	47	11	12	23	-8	16
Tom Kostopoulos	60	9	13	22	-14	67
Brian Holzinger^{‡}	61	6	15	21	-27	38
Drake Berehowsky^{‡}	47	5	16	21	-16	50
Mike Eastwood	82	4	15	19	-18	40
Matt Bradley	82	7	9	16	-27	65
Martin Strbak^{†}	44	3	11	14	-11	38
Lasse Pirjeta^{†}	13	6	6	12	3	0
Martin Straka^{‡}	22	4	8	12	-16	16
Eric Meloche	25	3	7	10	-6	20
Brooks Orpik	79	1	9	10	-36	127
Marc Bergevin^{‡}	52	1	8	9	-8	27
Mario Lemieux	10	1	8	9	-2	6
Josef Melichar	82	3	5	8	-17	62
Patrick Boileau	16	3	4	7	-16	8
Landon Wilson^{†}	19	5	1	6	0	31
Ramzi Abid	16	3	2	5	-5	27
Dan Focht	52	2	3	5	-23	105
Jon Sim^{†}	15	2	3	5	-4	6
Kelly Buchberger	71	1	3	4	-19	109
Matt Hussey	3	2	1	3	-1	0
Steve McKenna	49	1	2	3	-10	85
Rob Scuderi	13	1	2	3	2	4
Matt Murley	18	1	1	2	-6	14
Kris Beech	4	0	1	1	0	6
Reid Simpson	2	0	0	0	0	17
Nolan Baumgartner	5	0	0	0	-7	2
Steve Webb	5	0	0	0	-3	2
Total		190	332	522	—	1,230

Goaltenders

Regular season
Player	GP	GS	TOI	W	L	T	GA	GAA	SA	SV%	SO	G	A	PIM
Sebastien Caron	40	37	2212:35	9	24	5	138	3.74	1179	0.883	1	0	0	6
Jean-Sebastien Aubin	22	17	1067:03	7	9	0	53	2.98	574	0.908	1	0	0	2
Marc-Andre Fleury	21	20	1154:02	4	14	2	70	3.64	675	0.896	1	0	0	0
Andy Chiodo	8	8	485:37	3	4	1	28	3.46	260	0.892	0	0	0	0
Martin Brochu	1	0	32:40	0	0	0	1	1.84	19	0.947	0	0	0	0
Total		82	4951:57	23	51	8	290	3.51	2707	0.893	3	0	0	8

^{†}Denotes player spent time with another team before joining the Penguins. Stats reflect time with the Penguins only.
^{‡}Denotes player was traded mid-season. Stats reflect time with the Penguins only.

== Awards and records ==
- Mario Lemieux became the first person to score 1700 points for the Penguins. He did so in a 4–4 tie with the New York Islanders on October 29.

=== Awards ===
Type	Award/honor	Recipient	Ref
League (annual)	NHL All-Rookie Team	Ryan Malone (Forward)	
League (in-season)	NHL Rookie of the Month	Marc-Andre Fleury (October)	
League (in-season)	NHL YoungStars Game selection	Ryan Malone	
League (in-season)	NHL YoungStars Game selection	Brooks Orpik	
Team	A. T. Caggiano Memorial Booster Club Award	Ryan Malone	
Team	Aldege "Baz" Bastien Memorial Good Guy Award	Brooks Orpik	
Team	Leading Scorer Award	Dick Tarnstrom	
Team	Michel Briere Memorial Rookie of the Year Trophy	Ryan Malone	
Team	Most Valuable Player Award	Dick Tarnstrom	
Team	Players' Player Award	Kelly Buchberger	
Team	The Edward J. DeBartolo Community Service Award	Rico Fata	
Team	The Edward J. DeBartolo Community Service Award	Steve McKenna	

=== Records ===
The team also set the NHL record for longest home losing streak, with 14 home losses.

=== Milestones ===
Milestone	Player	Date	Ref
First game	Marc-Andre Fleury	October 10, 2003	
First game	Ryan Malone	October 10, 2003	
First game	Matt Murley	October 10, 2003	
First game	Rob Scuderi	February 12, 2004	
First game	Andy Chiodo	February 18, 2004	
First game	Matt Hussey	March 16, 2004	

== Transactions ==
The Penguins were involved in the following transactions from June 10, 2003, the day after the deciding game of the 2003 Stanley Cup Finals, through June 7, 2004, the day of the deciding game of the 2004 Stanley Cup Finals.

=== Trades ===
Date	Details		Ref
June 21, 2003	To Florida Panthers: Mikael Samuelsson; 1st-round pick in 2003; 2nd-round pick in 2003	To Pittsburgh Penguins: 1st-round pick in 2003; 3rd-round pick in 2003	
August 25, 2003	To Vancouver Canucks: Johan Hedberg	To Pittsburgh Penguins: 2nd-round pick in 2004	
November 30, 2003	To Los Angeles Kings: Martin Straka	To Pittsburgh Penguins: Sergei Anshakov; Martin Strbak	
February 10, 2004	To Columbus Blue Jackets: Brendan Buckley	To Pittsburgh Penguins: Pauli Levokari	
February 11, 2004	To Toronto Maple Leafs: Drake Berehowsky	To Pittsburgh Penguins: Ric Jackman	
February 22, 2004	To Phoenix Coyotes: Future considerations	To Pittsburgh Penguins: Landon Wilson	
March 8, 2004	To New York Islanders: Steve Webb	To Pittsburgh Penguins: Alain Nasreddine	
March 9, 2004	To Columbus Blue Jackets: Brian Holzinger	To Pittsburgh Penguins: Lasse Pirjeta	
March 9, 2004	To Vancouver Canucks: Marc Bergevin	To Pittsburgh Penguins: 7th-round pick in 2004	

=== Players acquired ===
Date	Player	Former team	Term	Via	Ref
July 31, 2003	Kelly Buchberger	Phoenix Coyotes		Free agency	
July 31, 2003	Mike Eastwood	Chicago Blackhawks		Free agency	
August 22, 2003	Martin Brochu	Severstal Cherepovets (RSL)		Free agency	
August 28, 2003	Patrick Boileau	Detroit Red Wings		Free agency	
August 29, 2003	Drake Berehowsky	Phoenix Coyotes		Free agency	
August 29, 2003	Reid Simpson	Nashville Predators		Free agency	
October 3, 2003	Nolan Baumgartner	Vancouver Canucks		Waiver draft	
October 22, 2003	Steve Webb	Philadelphia Flyers		Waivers	
March 4, 2004	Jon Sim	Los Angeles Kings		Waivers	

=== Players lost ===
Date	Player	New team	Via (Note: In parentheses is the player's free agency group on July 1 if applicable.)	Ref
June 23, 2003	Vladimir Vujtek	HPK (Liiga)	Free agency (UFA)	
July 12, 2003	Joel Bouchard	Buffalo Sabres	Free agency (UFA)	
July 26, 2003	Rob Tallas	HPK (Liiga)	Free agency (UFA)	
July 29, 2003	Ville Nieminen	Chicago Blackhawks	Free agency (UFA)	
August 4, 2003	Micki DuPont	Eisbaren Berlin (DEL)	Free agency (II) (Note: Pittsburgh retained DuPont’s NHL rights and re-signed him on June 15, 2006.)	
August 7, 2003	Mathias Johansson	Farjestad BK (SHL)	Free agency (UFA)	
August 20, 2003	Richard Lintner	Djurgardens IF (SHL)	Free agency (II) (Note: Pittsburgh retained Lintner’s NHL rights through the 2006–07 season.)	
September 10, 2003	Shawn Heins	Atlanta Thrashers	Free agency (UFA)	
September 10, 2003	Jason MacDonald	Hartford Wolf Pack (AHL)	Free agency	
September 30, 2003	Alexandre Daigle	Minnesota Wild	Free agency (UFA)	
October 8, 2003	Hans Jonsson	Modo Hockey (SHL)	Free agency (UFA)	
November 1, 2003	Nolan Baumgartner	Vancouver Canucks	Waivers	
November 18, 2003	Jamie Pushor	Syracuse Crunch (AHL)	Free agency (UFA)	
November 23, 2003	Kent Manderville	Timra IK (SHL)	Free agency (III)	
May 13, 2004	Patrick Boileau	Lausanne HC (NLA)	Free agency	
May 19, 2004	Michal Sivek	HC Sparta Praha (ELH)	Free agency (Note: Pittsburgh retained Sivek’s NHL rights through the 2007–08 season.)	

=== Signings ===
Date	Player	Term	Contract type	Ref
July 14, 2003	Ryan Malone	2-year	Entry-level	
July 29, 2003	Dick Tarnstrom	2-year	Re-signing	
July 31, 2003	Rico Fata		Re-signing	
July 31, 2003	Mario Lemieux	1-year	Re-signing	
July 31, 2003	Toby Petersen		Re-signing	
July 31, 2003	Rob Scuderi		Re-signing	
August 1, 2003	Matt Bradley	1-year	Re-signing	
August 1, 2003	Milan Kraft	1-year	Re-signing	
August 21, 2003	Andy Chiodo		Entry-level	
August 22, 2003	Sebastien Caron	4-year	Re-signing	
September 11, 2003	Ramzi Abid	1-year	Re-signing	
October 3, 2003	Cam Paddock		Entry-level	
October 6, 2003	Marc-Andre Fleury	3-year	Entry-level	
April 7, 2004	Ryan Whitney	3-year	Entry-level	
May 26, 2004	Maxime Talbot	3-year	Entry-level	
June 1, 2004	Erik Christensen		Entry-level	

=== Other ===
Player	Date	Details
Eddie Olczyk	June 11, 2003	Hired as head coach
Tom Barrasso	June 18, 2003	Retired (Note: Barrasso signed a one-day contract in order to retire as a member of the Penguins.)

== Draft picks ==
Pittsburgh had 11 picks in the 2003 NHL entry draft.

Round	#	Player	Pos	Nationality	College/Junior/Club team (League)
1	1^{[a]}	Marc-Andre Fleury	Goaltender	Canada	Cape Breton Screaming Eagles (QMJHL)
2	32	Ryan Stone	Center	Canada	Brandon Wheat Kings (WHL)
3	70	Jonathan Filewich	Right winger	Canada	Prince George Cougars (WHL)
3	73^{[b]}	Daniel Carcillo	Left winger	Canada	Sarnia Sting (OHL)
4	121^{[c]}	Paul Bissonnette	Defence	Canada	Saginaw Spirit (OHL)
5	161^{[d]}	Evgeni Isakov	Left wing	Russia	Severstal Cherepovets (RSL)
6	169	Lukas Bolf	Defence	Czech Republic	Sparta Prague (Czech Extraliga Jr.)
7	199	Andy Chiodo	Goaltender	Canada	Toronto St. Michael's Majors (OHL)
7	229^{[e]}	Stephen Dixon	Center	Canada	Cape Breton Screaming Eagles (QMJHL)
8	232	Joe Jensen	Center	United States	St. Cloud State University (WCHA)
9	263	Matt Moulson	Left wings	Canada	Cornell University (ECAC)

Draft notes

- ^{a} The Florida Panthers' first-round pick went to the Pittsburgh Penguins as a result of a June 21, 2003 trade that sent a 2003 first-round pick and a 2003 second round pick to the Panthers in exchange for a 2003 third-round pick and this pick.
- The Penguins' first-round pick went to the Florida Panthers as the result of a June 21, 2003 trade that sent a 2003 first-round pick and a 2003 third-round pick to the Penguins in exchange for Mikael Samuelsson, a 2003 first-round pick and this pick.
- The Penguins' third-round pick went to the Florida Panthers as the result of a June 21, 2003 trade that sent a 2003 first-round pick and a 2003 third-round pick to the Penguins in exchange for Mikael Samuelsson, a 2003 first-round pick and this pick.
- ^{b} The Florida Panthers' third-round pick went to the Pittsburgh Penguins as a result of a June 21, 2003 trade that sent Mikael Samuelsson, a 2003 first-round pick and a 2003 second round pick to the Panthers in exchange for a 2003 first-round pick and this pick.
- The Penguins' fourth-round pick went to the Columbus Blue Jackets as the result of a March 15, 2002 trade that sent Jamie Pushor to the Penguins in exchange for this pick.
- ^{c} The Boston Bruins' fourth-round pick went to the Pittsburgh Penguins as a result of a March 11, 2003 trade that sent Ian Moran the Bruins in exchange for this pick.
- The Penguins' fifth-round pick went to the San Jose Sharks as the result of a February 9, 2003 trade that sent Shawn Heins to the Penguins in exchange for this conditional pick.
- ^{d} The New York Islanders' fifth-round pick (from Philadelphia Flyers) went to the Pittsburgh Penguins as a result of a March 9, 2003 trade that sent Randy Robitaille the Islanders in exchange for this pick.
- ^{e} The New Jersey Devils' seventh-round pick went to the Pittsburgh Penguins as a result of a March 19, 2002 trade that sent Stephane Richer to the Devils in exchange for this pick.

== Farm teams ==
The AHL's Wilkes-Barre/Scranton Penguins finished third in the East Division with a 34–28–10–8 record. They defeated the Bridgeport Sound Tigers, Philadelphia Phantoms and the Hartford Wolf Pack to win the Richard F. Canning Trophy as Eastern Conference Champions. They were swept by the Milwaukee Admirals in the Calder Cup Finals.

The ECHL's Wheeling Nailers won the Northern Division and the Eastern Conference with a record of 51–17–4. They lost to the Reading Royals in the first round of the playoffs. Pat Bingham won the John Brophy Award as the ECHL's coach of the year.

== See also ==
- 2003–04 NHL season
