= Rob Scuderi =

American ice hockey player

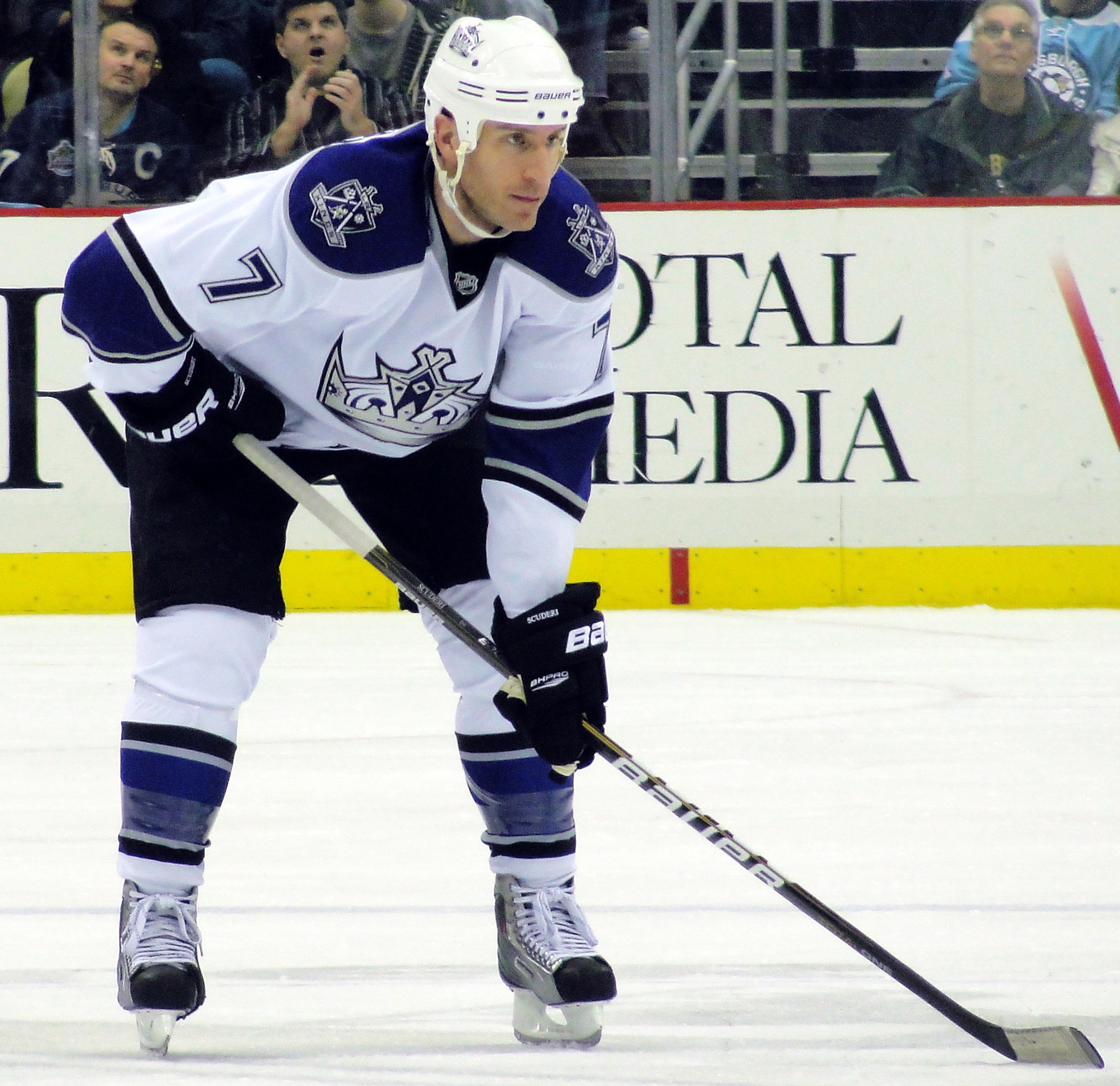
- Scuderi with the Los Angeles Kings in February 2011
- Born: December 30, 1978 (age 47) Syosset, New York, U.S.
- Height: 6 ft 1 in (185 cm)
- Weight: 212 lb (96 kg; 15 st 2 lb)
- Position: Defense
- Shot: Left
- Played for: Pittsburgh Penguins; Los Angeles Kings; Chicago Blackhawks
- NHL draft: 134th overall, 1998; Pittsburgh Penguins
- Playing career: 2001–2017

Robert John Scuderi (born December 30, 1978) is an American former professional ice hockey defenseman, currently serving as an assistant coach for the National Hockey League's Nashville Predators.

Known as a stay-at-home defenseman, he played in 783 career regular season games for the Pittsburgh Penguins, Los Angeles Kings and the Chicago Blackhawks. He is a two-time Stanley Cup champion, winning as a member of the Penguins in 2009 and the Kings in 2012.

== Playing career ==
=== Amateur ===
As a youth, Scuderi played in the 1992 Quebec International Pee-Wee Hockey Tournament with the New York Islanders minor ice hockey team.

Scuderi attended St. Anthony's High School in South Huntington, New York, before graduating in 1997. After high school, Scuderi attended Boston College, where he played four seasons for the Eagles. Following his freshman season, in which he tallied 24 assists in 42 games, Scuderi was drafted in the fifth round, 134th overall, by the Pittsburgh Penguins in the 1998 NHL entry draft. However, he remained at Boston College for three more years. At the end of his collegiate career, he held the Eagles' record for most games played, tallying 169 appearances for the team. He played his final game in the 2001 NCAA Division I Men's Ice Hockey Tournament championship game, which BC won over defending champion North Dakota, 3–2, in overtime.

=== Pittsburgh Penguins ===
In 2001, Scuderi began his professional career in the American Hockey League (AHL) with the Wilkes-Barre/Scranton Penguins, the Pittsburgh Penguins' minor league affiliate. That season, he played in 75 games, recording a goal and 22 assists.

Scuderi played in his first career NHL game during the 2003–04 season. After gaining three points in 13 games in Pittsburgh, he spent the 2004–05 season in the AHL due to the 2004–05 NHL lockout.

His second NHL season, 2005–06, was a struggle, as he contributed just four points in 56 games, but his reliability as a stay-at-home defenseman meant that he earned a permanent position in Pittsburgh for the 2006–07 season, appearing in 78 games, scoring a goal and ten assists.

On February 2, 2008, Scuderi played his 200th career NHL game against the Carolina Hurricanes. Additionally, on October 4, 2008, Scuderi ended a 120-game scoreless streak in Stockholm against the Ottawa Senators, when he scored a tying goal to get the Penguins into an overtime situation; they later won the game.

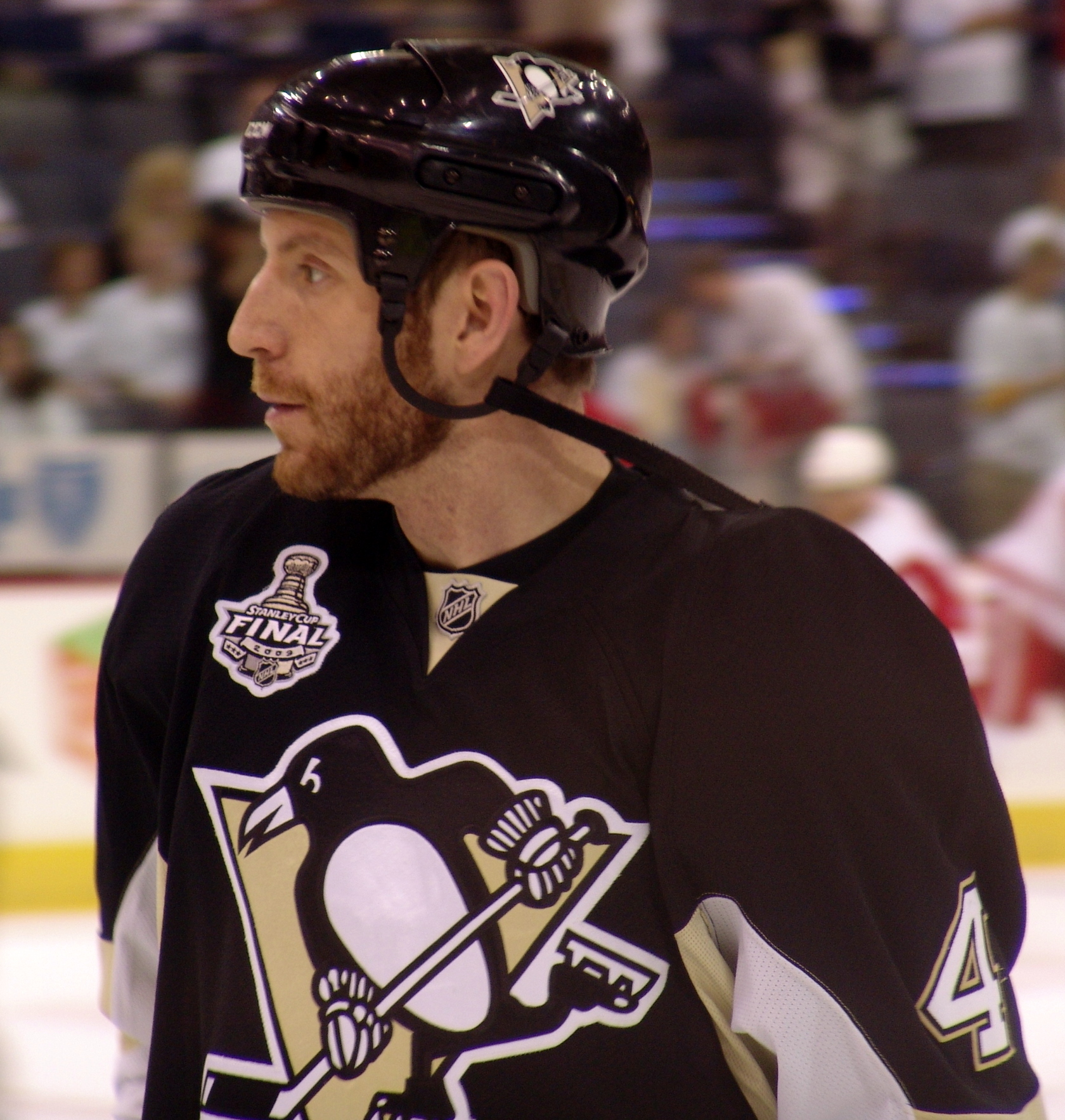
Scuderi with the Penguins in 2009

On April 19, 2009, Scuderi recorded his first career Stanley Cup playoff goal against the Philadelphia Flyers in game three of the Eastern Conference Quarter-finals.

During the 2009 playoffs, Scuderi's Penguin teammates rechristened him with the nickname "The Piece," after he misspoke during an interview when he referred to himself as "the [missing] piece" to the puzzle, intending to say that he was "a piece" to the puzzle. He had previously been known simply as "Scuds," a shortening of his surname.

On June 12, 2009, Scuderi won the Stanley Cup with Pittsburgh. He made a crucial play late in game six of the 2009 Stanley Cup Final, with the Penguins hanging on to a 2–1 lead over the Detroit Red Wings; Scuderi stopped a shot at a wide open net by Johan Franzén with his stick, then stopped Franzén again with his skate. Scuderi became the first Long Island native to have his name engraved on the Stanley Cup.

Within weeks of winning the Cup, Scuderi hit the market as an unrestricted free agent, as the Penguins could not afford him under the salary cap.

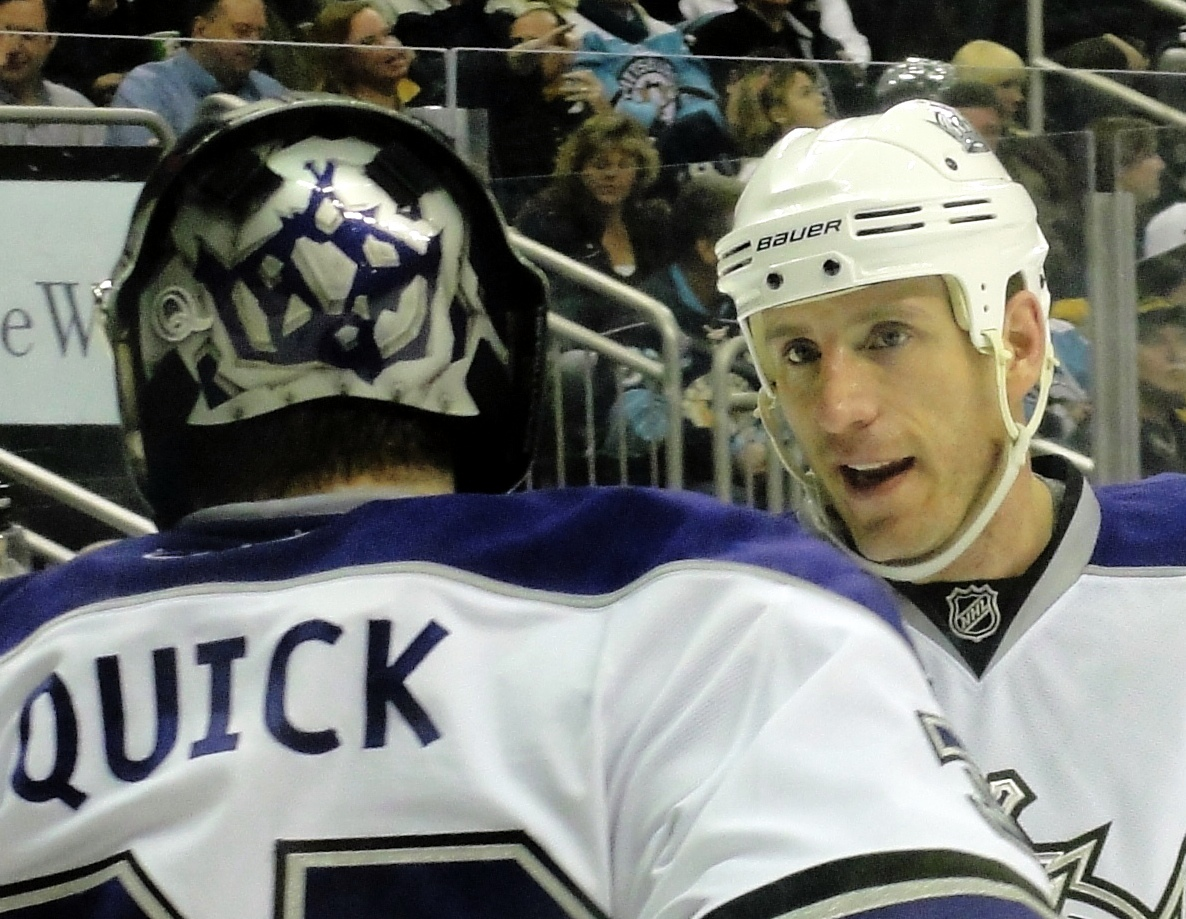
Scuderi talking to Kings goalie Jonathan Quick, February 2011

=== Los Angeles Kings ===
On July 2, 2009, Scuderi was signed by the Los Angeles Kings to a four-year, $13.6 million contract. He debuted for the Kings on October 3, 2009, and tallied his first point, an assist to Ryan Smyth, in a Los Angeles uniform in an October 8 Kings win over the Minnesota Wild.

Scuderi won his second Stanley Cup in four years on June 11, 2012, over the New Jersey Devils. He took a hit early in the first period, which resulted in a five-minute major penalty and three subsequent powerplay goals for the Kings, leading them to their first ever Stanley Cup.

=== Second stint with Penguins ===
On July 5, 2013, it was announced that Scuderi had re-signed with his former team in Pittsburgh on a four-year, $13.5 million contract.

Scuderi crashed into the boards as a result of a legal hit by David Clarkson of the Toronto Maple Leafs on October 26, 2013, in a 4–1 defeat. Scuderi missed over two months, later returning to play on December 28.

=== Chicago Blackhawks ===
In the 2015–16 season, Scuderi provided 4 assists in 25 games for the Penguins before he was traded to the Chicago Blackhawks in exchange for fellow defenseman Trevor Daley on December 14, 2015. He made his Blackhawks debut the following day, playing alongside former Penguins defenseman Michal Roszival, in a 3-0 defeat to the Colorado Avalanche. After 17 scoreless games with the Blackhawks, Scuderi was placed on waivers and upon clearing was assigned to AHL affiliate, the Rockford IceHogs on February 17, 2016.

=== Return to Los Angeles ===
On February 26, 2016, the Blackhawks traded Scuderi back to the Los Angeles Kings in exchange for Christian Ehrhoff.

== Coaching career ==
=== Nashville Predators ===
Scuderi was named interim assistant coach with the Nashville Predators on January 7, 2020.

== Personal life ==
Scuderi grew up in Bethpage, New York. He is married to Courtney and the couple have four children: two sons and two daughters

== Career statistics ==
			Regular season					Playoffs
Season	Team	League	GP	G	A	Pts	PIM	GP	G	A	Pts	PIM
1995–96	New York Apple Core	MetJHL	76	18	60	78		—	—	—	—	—
1996–97	New York Apple Core	MetJHL	82	42	70	112	64	—	—	—	—	—
1997–98	Boston College Eagles	HE	42	0	24	24	12	—	—	—	—	—
1998–99	Boston College Eagles	HE	41	2	8	10	20	—	—	—	—	—
1999–2000	Boston College Eagles	HE	42	1	13	14	24	—	—	—	—	—
2000–01	Boston College Eagles	HE	43	4	19	23	66	—	—	—	—	—
2001–02	Wilkes–Barre/Scranton Penguins	AHL	75	1	22	23	66	—	—	—	—	—
2002–03	Wilkes–Barre/Scranton Penguins	AHL	74	4	17	21	44	6	0	1	1	4
2003–04	Pittsburgh Penguins	NHL	13	1	2	3	4	—	—	—	—	—
2003–04	Wilkes–Barre/Scranton Penguins	AHL	64	0	15	16	54	24	0	3	3	1
2004–05	Wilkes–Barre/Scranton Penguins	AHL	79	2	18	2	34	11	2	1	3	2
2005–06	Pittsburgh Penguins	NHL	57	0	4	4	36	—	—	—	—	—
2005–06	Wilkes–Barre/Scranton Penguins	AHL	13	0	8	8	8	—	—	—	—	—
2006–07	Pittsburgh Penguins	NHL	78	1	10	11	28	5	0	0	0	2
2007–08	Pittsburgh Penguins	NHL	71	0	5	5	26	20	0	3	3	2
2008–09	Pittsburgh Penguins	NHL	81	1	15	16	18	24	1	4	5	6
2009–10	Los Angeles Kings	NHL	73	0	11	11	21	6	0	0	0	6
2010–11	Los Angeles Kings	NHL	82	2	13	15	16	6	0	2	2	0
2011–12	Los Angeles Kings	NHL	82	1	8	9	16	20	0	1	1	4
2012–13	Los Angeles Kings	NHL	48	1	11	12	4	18	0	3	3	0
2013–14	Pittsburgh Penguins	NHL	53	0	4	4	2	13	0	0	0	6
2014–15	Pittsburgh Penguins	NHL	82	1	9	10	17	5	0	0	0	0
2015–16	Pittsburgh Penguins	NHL	25	0	4	4	8	—	—	—	—	—
2015–16	Chicago Blackhawks	NHL	17	0	0	0	0	—	—	—	—	—
2015–16	Rockford IceHogs	AHL	3	0	0	0	2	—	—	—	—	—
2015–16	Los Angeles Kings	NHL	21	0	6	6	2	5	0	0	0	2
2016–17	Ontario Reign	AHL	15	0	3	3	4	—	—	—	—	—
AHL totals			323	8	83	91	212	41	2	5	7	20
NHL totals			783	8	102	110	198	122	1	13	14	28

== Awards and honors ==
Award	Year
All-Hockey East Rookie Team	1997–98
All-NCAA All-Tournament Team	2001
Stanley Cup Champion	2009, 2012

Awards and achievements
Preceded by Patrick Boileau; Kris Beech; Tom Kostopoulos	Captain of the Wilkes-Barre/Scranton Penguins; 2004–05	Succeeded by Alain Nasreddine
