= Steve Webb (ice hockey) =

Canadian ice hockey player (born 1975)

- Born: April 30, 1975 (age 50) Peterborough, Ontario, Canada
- Height: 6 ft 0 in (183 cm)
- Weight: 224 lb (102 kg; 16 st 0 lb)
- Position: Right wing
- Shot: Right
- Played for: New York Islanders; Pittsburgh Penguins
- NHL draft: 176th overall, 1994; Buffalo Sabres
- Playing career: 1996–2004

Stephen Webb (born April 30, 1975) is a Canadian former professional ice hockey player. He was picked in the seventh round of the 1994 draft by the Buffalo Sabres. He played for the New York Islanders and Pittsburgh Penguins between 1996 and 2004

Webb became a fan favorite during the 2001–02 season with the New York Islanders for a number of hard open-ice checks he delivered on opposing players, including Theoren Fleury of the New York Rangers. In the playoffs, Webb established himself with a number of hard hits on numerous Toronto Maple Leafs players. At one point during the playoffs, he made a huge hit on Toronto forward Darcy Tucker seen as retribution for Tucker injuring Isles captain Michael Peca in the previous game.

Steve Webb was the recipient of the Bob Nystrom award in 2002 for the Islander that best exemplifies hard work, leadership, and dedication on and off the ice. He is the Assistant Coach of the Long Island Royals, a team in the Atlantic Metropolitan Hockey League located in Kings Park, New York and runs a charitable outreach organization for kids called the W20 Foundation.

== Playing career ==
Webb lived and played hockey in Milton, Ontario until age 12, when he moved to Peterborough. He bought a home in Milton while playing. Webb played junior hockey for three seasons in the Ontario Hockey League with the Windsor Spitfires and Peterborough Petes. Webb then split a season between the Muskegon Fury of the Colonial Hockey League and the Detroit Vipers of the International Hockey League. Webb finally made it to the NHL with the New York Islanders. He split that season with the Islanders American Hockey League affiliate, the Kentucky Thoroughblades. Webb split the next season between the same two teams. In the next season, he played for both the Islanders and their new AHL affiliate, the Lowell Lock Monsters. Webb then played the next four seasons solely for the Islanders before moving on to the Pittsburgh Penguins. His signing with the Penguins didn't go quite as planned, as Webb was sent down to the Penguins AHL affiliate, the Wilkes-Barre/Scranton Penguins. Webb was traded back to the Islanders, but played a few games with their AHL affiliate, the Bridgeport Sound Tigers. Webb finished off the season back with the Islanders before retiring.

== Career statistics ==
=== Regular season and playoffs ===
			Regular season					Playoffs
Season	Team	League	GP	G	A	Pts	PIM	GP	G	A	Pts	PIM
1992–93	Windsor Spitfires	OHL	63	14	25	39	181	—	—	—	—	—
1993–94	Windsor Spitfires	OHL	33	6	15	21	117	—	—	—	—	—
1993–94	Peterborough Petes	OHL	2	0	1	1	9	6	1	1	2	10
1994–95	Peterborough Petes	OHL	42	8	16	24	109	11	3	3	6	22
1995–96	Muskegon Fury	CoHL	58	18	24	42	263	5	1	2	3	22
1995–96	Detroit Vipers	IHL	4	0	0	0	24	—	—	—	—	—
1996–97	New York Islanders	NHL	41	1	4	5	144	—	—	—	—	—
1996–97	Kentucky Thoroughblades	AHL	25	6	6	12	103	2	0	0	0	19
1997–98	New York Islanders	NHL	20	0	0	0	35	—	—	—	—	—
1997–98	Kentucky Thoroughblades	AHL	37	5	13	18	139	3	0	1	1	10
1998–99	New York Islanders	NHL	45	0	0	0	32	—	—	—	—	—
1998–99	Lowell Lock Monsters	AHL	23	2	4	6	80	—	—	—	—	—
1999–00	New York Islanders	NHL	65	1	3	4	103	—	—	—	—	—
2000–01	New York Islanders	NHL	40	0	1	1	147	—	—	—	—	—
2001–02	New York Islanders	NHL	60	2	4	6	104	7	0	0	0	12
2002–03	New York Islanders	NHL	49	1	0	1	75	5	0	0	0	10
2003–04	Pittsburgh Penguins	NHL	5	0	0	0	43	—	—	—	—	—
2003–04	Wilkes-Barre/Scranton Penguins	AHL	30	4	7	11	48	—	—	—	—	—
2003–04	New York Islanders	NHL	9	0	3	3	23	2	0	0	0	6
2003–04	Bridgeport Sound Tigers	AHL	7	0	1	1	29	5	0	0	0	4
NHL totals			321	5	13	18	532	14	0	0	0	28
