= Matt Hussey =

American ice hockey player (born 1979)

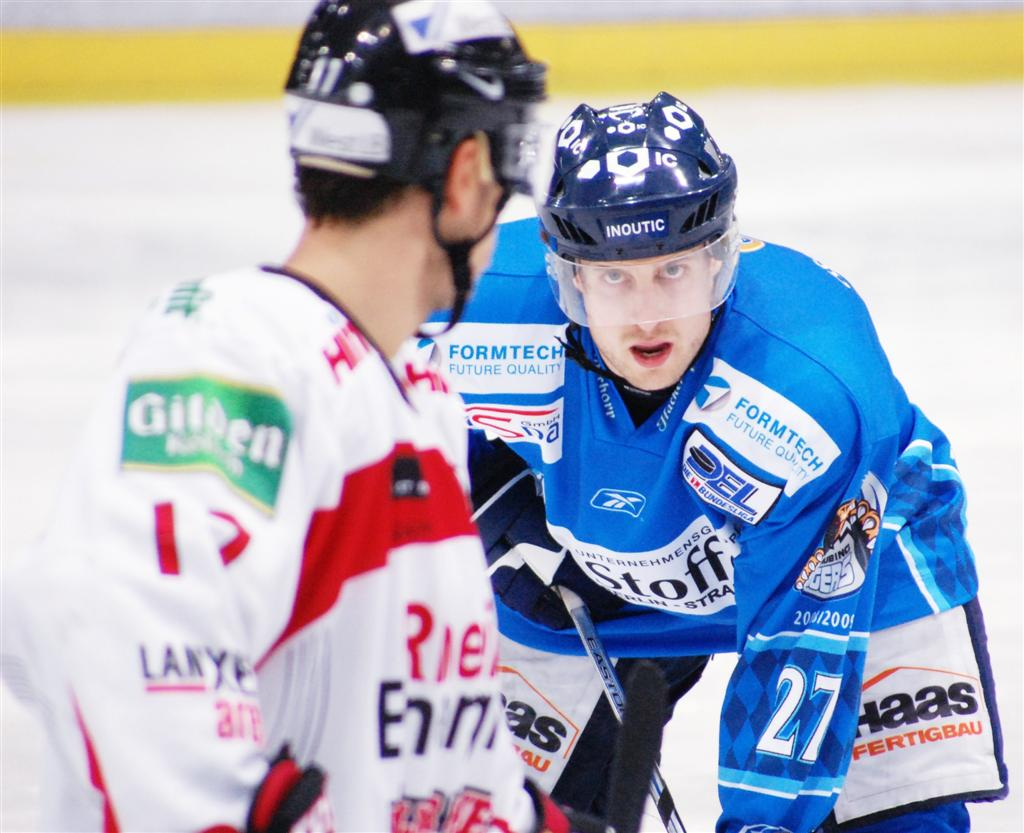
- Born: May 28, 1979 (age 47) New Haven, Connecticut, U.S.
- Height: 6 ft 2 in (188 cm)
- Weight: 210 lb (95 kg; 15 st 0 lb)
- Position: Center
- Shot: Left
- Played for: Pittsburgh Penguins; Detroit Red Wings; Jokerit; Straubing Tigers; ERC Ingolstadt; Thomas Sabo Ice Tigers; HC 07 Detva; Dragons de Rouen
- NHL draft: 254th overall, 1998; Pittsburgh Penguins
- Playing career: 2002–2017

Matthew P. Hussey (born May 28, 1979) is an American former professional ice hockey center who played in the National Hockey League (NHL) with the Pittsburgh Penguins and Detroit Red Wings. He later played professional ice hockey in Europe in Finland, Germany, Slovakia and France.

== Playing career ==
Hussey was born in New Haven, Connecticut and raised in Plymouth, Minnesota. He was drafted in the ninth round, 254th overall, by the Pittsburgh Penguins in the 1998 NHL entry draft.

Drafted from the high school hockey team, Avon Old Farms, Hussey was recruited to play collegiate hockey with the University of Wisconsin in the WCHA. After his senior year, Hussey scored 84 points in 154 games with the Badgers. On September 27, 2002, he was signed to an entry-level contract with the Penguins.

Hussey made his professional debut with the Penguins AHL affiliate, Wilkes-Barre/Scranton in the 2002–03 season. He spent the next four seasons primarily in the AHL, playing only 16 games with Pittsburgh. In the 2005–06 season he led the baby pens in scoring with 51 points.

On July 13, 2006, Hussey signed as a free agent with the Detroit Red Wings to a one-year contract. He played in five games with the Wings in 2006–07 but similarly played most of the year in the AHL with affiliate, the Grand Rapids Griffins.

On July 13, 2007, Hussey then signed a one-year contract with the Colorado Avalanche. He failed to make the Avalanche and was assigned to AHL affiliate, the Lake Erie Monsters for their inaugural 2007–08 season. In his first game with the Lake Erie, Hussey was credited with scoring the Monsters' first goal in franchise history in a 3-2 loss to the Griffins on October 6, 2007. Midway into the season, Hussey left the Monsters and signed with Finnish team Jokerit on January 30, 2008.

Hussey signed with the German team Straubing Tigers of the DEL, for 2008–09 before transferring to ERC Ingolstadt on March 9, 2009. In his third year with the team, he was named European Hockey Player of the Month for January 2012 by Eurohockey.com. He scored five goals and nine assists in nine games.

After remaining a free agent midway into the 2013–14 season, Hussey agreed to play for the remainder of the season with his third DEL club, the Thomas Sabo Ice Tigers, on December 11, 2013.

Hussey returned from Europe at the conclusion of the season with the Ice Tigers and took a year's hiatus from professional hockey. On October 13, 2015, he returned to professional hockey after he signed a contract in the ECHL with the Evansville IceMen to begin the 2015–16 season. He later returned to Europe and after a stint in Slovakia, he finished his professional career in France with Dragons de Rouen in the Ligue Magnus in the 2016–17 season. He currently coaches his sons mni-mite team in Fairmont MN.

== Career statistics ==
			Regular Season					Playoffs
Season	Team	League	GP	G	A	Pts	PIM	GP	G	A	Pts	PIM
1996–97	Wayzata High School	HSMN	48	34	31	65	—	—	—	—	—	—
1997–98	Avon Old Farms	HS–Prep	26	26	23	49	20	—	—	—	—	—
1998–99	University of Wisconsin	WCHA	37	10	5	15	18	—	—	—	—	—
1999–2000	University of Wisconsin	WCHA	35	5	11	16	8	—	—	—	—	—
2000–01	University of Wisconsin	WCHA	40	9	11	20	24	—	—	—	—	—
2001–02	University of Wisconsin	WCHA	39	18	15	33	16	—	—	—	—	—
2002–03	Wilkes–Barre/Scranton Penguins	AHL	69	12	11	23	28	2	0	0	0	0
2003–04	Wilkes–Barre/Scranton Penguins	AHL	55	2	1	3	6	6	2	2	4	0
2003–04	Pittsburgh Penguins	NHL	3	2	1	3	0	—	—	—	—	—
2004–05	Wilkes–Barre/Scranton Penguins	AHL	80	16	14	30	19	10	1	2	3	2
2005–06	Wilkes–Barre/Scranton Penguins	AHL	65	21	30	51	34	9	1	0	1	0
2005–06	Pittsburgh Penguins	NHL	13	0	1	1	0	—	—	—	—	—
2006–07	Grand Rapids Griffins	AHL	75	15	29	44	36	6	1	1	2	2
2006–07	Detroit Red Wings	NHL	5	0	0	0	2	—	—	—	—	—
2007–08	Lake Erie Monsters	AHL	37	8	8	16	18	—	—	—	—	—
2007–08	Jokerit	SM-l	11	0	3	3	4	—	—	—	—	—
2008–09	Straubing Tigers	DEL	48	16	27	43	48	—	—	—	—	—
2009–10	ERC Ingolstadt	DEL	51	20	20	40	26	9	1	3	4	6
2010–11	ERC Ingolstadt	DEL	51	15	15	30	36	4	0	2	2	0
2011–12	Straubing Tigers	DEL	42	23	22	45	10	8	2	2	4	4
2012–13	Straubing Tigers	DEL	33	6	9	15	28	6	2	1	3	0
2013–14	Thomas Sabo Ice Tigers	DEL	14	2	10	12	18	3	1	0	1	0
2015–16	Evansville IceMen	ECHL	8	0	1	1	4	—	—	—	—	—
2015–16	HC 07 Detva	SVK–2	5	0	3	3	2	7	2	5	7	14
2016–17	Dragons de Rouen	FRA	44	5	10	15	14	19	5	6	11	6
AHL totals			381	74	93	167	141	33	5	5	10	4
NHL totals			21	2	2	4	2	—	—	—	—	—
DEL totals			239	82	103	185	166	30	6	8	14	10
