= Patrick Boileau =

Canadian ice hockey player (born 1975)

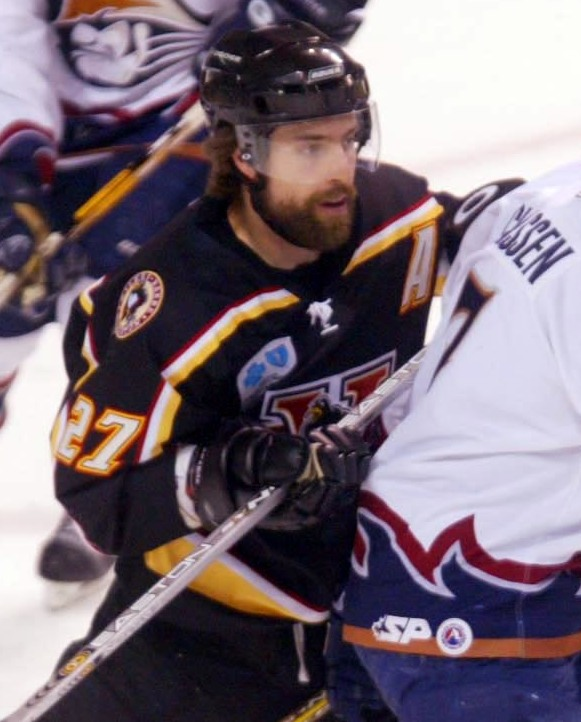
- Boileau with the Wilkes-Barre/Scranton Penguins in 2004
- Born: February 22, 1975 (age 51) Montreal, Quebec, Canada
- Height: 6 ft 0 in (183 cm)
- Weight: 202 lb (92 kg; 14 st 6 lb)
- Position: Defence
- Shot: Right
- Played for: Washington Capitals; Detroit Red Wings; Pittsburgh Penguins; Lausanne HC; Frankfurt Lions; Hamburg Freezers
- NHL draft: 69th overall, 1993; Washington Capitals
- Playing career: 1995–2008

Patrick Boileau (born February 22, 1975) is a Canadian former ice hockey defenceman. He played 48 games in the National Hockey League with the Washington Capitals, Detroit Red Wings, and Pittsburgh Penguins between 1997 and 2004. The rest of his career, which lasted from 1995 to 2008, was spent in various minor leagues and in Europe.

Boileau was born in Montreal, Quebec and raised in Blainville, Quebec. Selected by the Washington Capitals in the 1993 NHL entry draft, he spent years in the Capitals system mainly with their AHL affiliate Portland Pirates until he signed with the Detroit Red Wings in 2002. In 2003, he signed with the Pittsburgh Penguins. In 2004, he played in Switzerland for Lausanne and in 2005 he moved to Germany to play for the Frankfurt Lions of the Deutsche Eishockey Liga and also played for the Hamburg Freezers. In 2007–2008 he played with the Summum Chiefs de Saint-Jean-sur-Richelieu in the LNAH.

== Career statistics ==
=== Regular season and playoffs ===
			Regular season					Playoffs
Season	Team	League	GP	G	A	Pts	PIM	GP	G	A	Pts	PIM
1990–91	Laval-Laurentides-Lanaudiere Regents	QMAAA	3	0	1	1	0	—	—	—	—	—
1991–92	Laval-Laurentides-Lanaudiere Regents	QMAAA	42	9	36	45	94	12	3	5	8	10
1992–93	Laval Titan	QMJHL	69	4	19	23	73	13	1	2	3	10
1992–93	Laval Titan	M-Cup	—	—	—	—	—	5	0	1	1	4
1993–94	Laval Titan	QMJHL	64	13	57	70	56	21	1	7	8	24
1993–94	Laval Titan	M-Cup	—	—	—	—	—	5	0	0	0	0
1994–95	Laval Titan Collège Français	QMJHL	38	8	25	33	46	20	4	16	20	24
1995–96	Portland Pirates	AHL	78	10	28	38	41	19	1	3	4	12
1996–97	Washington Capitals	NHL	1	0	0	0	0	—	—	—	—	—
1996–97	Portland Pirates	AHL	67	16	28	44	63	5	1	1	2	4
1997–98	Portland Pirates	AHL	47	6	21	27	53	10	0	1	1	8
1998–99	Indianapolis Ice	IHL	29	8	13	21	27	4	0	1	1	2
1998–99	Washington Capitals	NHL	4	0	1	1	2	—	—	—	—	—
1998–99	Portland Pirates	AHL	52	6	18	24	52	—	—	—	—	—
1999–00	Portland Pirates	AHL	63	2	15	17	61	4	0	0	0	4
2000–01	Portland Pirates	AHL	77	6	14	20	50	3	0	0	0	8
2001–02	Washington Capitals	NHL	2	0	0	0	2	—	—	—	—	—
2001–02	Portland Pirates	AHL	75	17	19	36	43	—	—	—	—	—
2002–03	Detroit Red Wings	NHL	25	2	6	8	14	—	—	—	—	—
2002–03	Grand Rapids Griffins	AHL	23	2	11	13	39	—	—	—	—	—
2003–04	Wilkes-Barre/Scranton Penguins	AHL	51	6	29	35	43	24	3	9	12	2
2003–04	Pittsburgh Penguins	NHL	16	3	4	7	8	—	—	—	—	—
2004–05	Lausanne	NLB	29	7	12	19	38	—	—	—	—	—
2005–06	Frankfurt Lions	DEL	52	7	21	28	52	—	—	—	—	—
2006–07	Hamburg Freezers	DEL	52	5	19	24	84	7	0	2	2	16
2007–08	St. Jean Chiefs	LNAH	39	10	42	52	28	—	—	—	—	—
AHL totals			533	71	183	254	445	65	5	14	19	38
NHL totals			48	5	11	16	26	—	—	—	—	—

Awards and achievements
Preceded by Tom Kostopoulos	Captain of the Wilkes-Barre/Scranton Penguins; 2003-04 (shared with); Kris Beech; Tom Kostopoulos	Succeeded by Alain Nasreddine
