= Tom Kostopoulos =

Ice hockey player

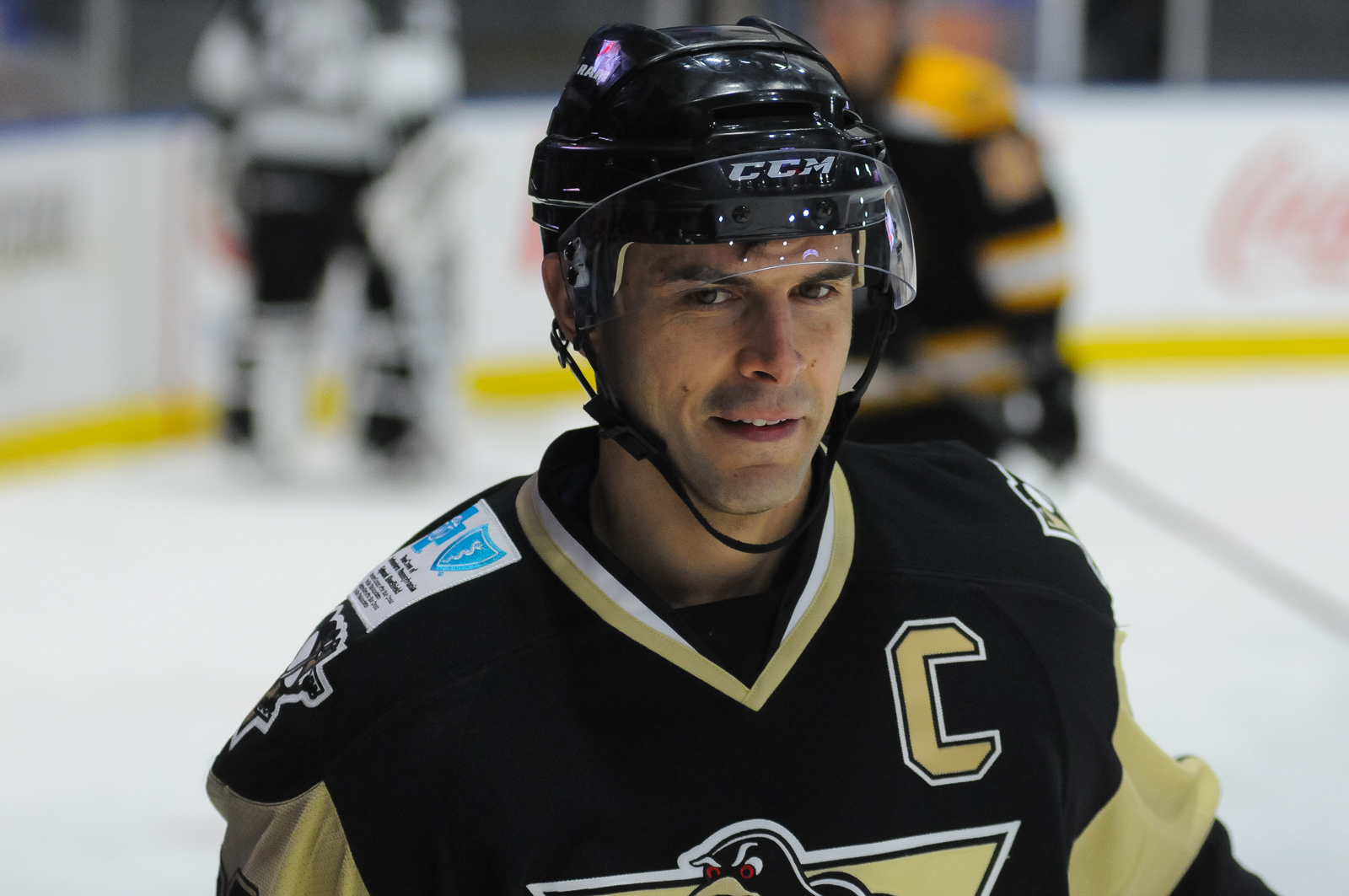
- Kostopoulos with the Wilkes-Barre/Scranton Penguins in 2015
- Born: January 24, 1979 (age 47) Mississauga, Ontario, Canada
- Height: 6 ft 0 in (183 cm)
- Weight: 204 lb (93 kg; 14 st 8 lb)
- Position: Right wing
- Shot: Right
- Played for: Pittsburgh Penguins; Los Angeles Kings; Montreal Canadiens; Carolina Hurricanes; Calgary Flames; New Jersey Devils
- NHL draft: 204th overall, 1999; Pittsburgh Penguins
- Playing career: 1999–2018

Thomas George Kostopoulos (Greek: Θωμάς Κωστόπουλος; born January 24, 1979) is a Canadian former professional ice hockey player. He most notably played in the National Hockey League (NHL) before playing his career with the Wilkes-Barre/Scranton Penguins in the American Hockey League (AHL). Kostopoulos was selected by the Pittsburgh Penguins in the seventh round (204th overall) of the 1999 NHL entry draft, and the 2017–18 season was his 19th year as a professional hockey player.

== Playing career ==
In his early years, Kostopoulos graduated from Fairwind Senior Public School in 1993. As a youth, he played in the 1993 Quebec International Pee-Wee Hockey Tournament with the Toronto Red Wings minor ice hockey team. After playing much of his minor hockey in the GTHL with the Toronto Marlboros and Mississauga Reps, Kostopoulos played one year with the Brampton Capitals of the OJHL (OHA). He was a 2nd round pick (18th overall) in the 1996 OHL Priority Selection by the London Knights.

Kostopoulos was drafted by the Pittsburgh Penguins in the seventh round of the 1999 NHL entry draft. Before that he played junior hockey with the London Knights of the Ontario Hockey League. He made his professional minor-league hockey debut with the Wilkes-Barre/Scranton Penguins of the American Hockey League. Kostopoulos made his NHL debut with the Penguins in the 2001–02 season and enjoyed his best season so far with Pittsburgh in 2003–04. During the 2005 off season, he played with the Manchester Monarchs, having signed a free-agent contract with the Los Angeles Kings. On July 3, 2007 he signed a free-agent contract with the Montreal Canadiens.

On January 22, 2008, he recorded a Gordie Howe hat trick in an 8–2 victory against the Boston Bruins.

On November 10, 2008, Kostopoulos was suspended for three games for a hit on Toronto Maple Leafs defenceman Mike Van Ryn during the game between the teams on November 8. He was given a boarding major penalty and ejected from the game. Kostopoulos also forfeited US-$33,000 in pay. Kostopoulos responded about the incident by saying," First and foremost, I sincerely regret the injuries suffered by Mike Van Ryn...this is an unfortunate turn of events. I was just trying to get in on the forecheck and get the puck. I didn't anticipate him turning and couldn't stop. I was trying to finish my check and obviously it did not end up well. I never intend on injuring another player. I feel bad. I hope he is going to be all right and resume playing as quickly as possible." NHL disciplinarian Colin Campbell said in announcing the suspension that while Van Ryn was not in a defenceless position, his injuries—including a concussion—were significant enough to warrant suspending Kostopoulos.

Kostopoulos was again suspended for a January 7, 2011, hit which broke Brad Stuart's jaw. Kostopoulos was assessed a minor roughing penalty during the game, but then served a six-game suspension for making primary contact with the head.

On January 23, 2013, the Wilkes-Barre/Scranton Penguins of the AHL announced Kostopoulos had signed with the team on a Professional Try Out. On March 5, 2013, the Pittsburgh Penguins signed Kostopoulos to a one-year two-way contract but was claimed off waivers by the New Jersey Devils the following day.

On September 3, 2013, Kostopoulos signed a one-year AHL contract to continue to play with and lead the Wilkes-Barre/Scranton Penguins.

== Coaching career ==
On April 4, 2018, Kostopoulos announced he planned on retiring at the conclusion of the 2017–18 season, his 19th professional year. After retiring, he joined the Penguins organization as a player development coach.

== Personal life ==
Kostopoulos was born in Mississauga, Ontario, on January 24, 1979. He names his brother Chris, a coach in Texas, as his biggest influence in hockey. Kostopoulos has three nephews, Cameron, Tyler, and Josh who live in Texas with his brother Chris. Kostopoulos also has one half sister, Laurie Bodley. They spend their offseasons in Oakville, Ontario.

Kostopoulos and his wife Lisa have two children together.

His mother is Cheryl Kostopoulos, who is of English heritage, and his father is George Kostopoulos, who is Greek.

He is of Greek descent, and in 2008 was the grand marshal of the Hellenic Community of Montreal's Greek Independence Day parade. Kostopoulos is involved with the Canadian Cancer Society as well as Garth Brooks' Teammates For Kids Foundation.

== Career statistics ==
			Regular season					Playoffs
Season	Team	League	GP	G	A	Pts	PIM	GP	G	A	Pts	PIM
1995–96	Brampton Capitals	OPJHL	24	9	9	18	28	—	—	—	—	—
1996–97	London Knights	OHL	64	13	12	25	67	—	—	—	—	—
1997–98	London Knights	OHL	66	24	26	50	108	16	6	4	10	26
1998–99	London Knights	OHL	66	27	60	87	114	25	19	16	35	32
1999–00	Wilkes–Barre/Scranton Penguins	AHL	76	26	32	58	121	—	—	—	—	—
2000–01	Wilkes–Barre/Scranton Penguins	AHL	80	16	36	52	120	21	3	9	12	6
2001–02	Pittsburgh Penguins	NHL	11	1	2	3	9	—	—	—	—	—
2001–02	Wilkes–Barre/Scranton Penguins	AHL	70	27	26	53	112	—	—	—	—	—
2002–03	Wilkes–Barre/Scranton Penguins	AHL	71	21	42	63	131	6	1	2	3	7
2002–03	Pittsburgh Penguins	NHL	8	0	1	1	0	—	—	—	—	—
2003–04	Wilkes–Barre/Scranton Penguins	AHL	21	7	13	20	43	24	7	16	23	3
2003–04	Pittsburgh Penguins	NHL	60	9	13	22	67	—	—	—	—	—
2004–05	Manchester Monarchs	AHL	64	25	46	71	99	6	0	7	7	10
2005–06	Los Angeles Kings	NHL	76	8	14	22	100	—	—	—	—	—
2006–07	Los Angeles Kings	NHL	76	7	15	22	73	—	—	—	—	—
2007–08	Montreal Canadiens	NHL	67	7	6	13	113	12	3	1	4	6
2008–09	Montreal Canadiens	NHL	78	8	14	22	106	4	0	1	1	4
2009–10	Carolina Hurricanes	NHL	82	8	13	21	106	—	—	—	—	—
2010–11	Carolina Hurricanes	NHL	17	1	3	4	30	—	—	—	—	—
2010–11	Calgary Flames	NHL	59	7	7	14	44	—	—	—	—	—
2011–12	Calgary Flames	NHL	81	4	8	12	57	—	—	—	—	—
2012–13	Wilkes–Barre/Scranton Penguins	AHL	17	3	4	7	43	—	—	—	—	—
2012–13	New Jersey Devils	NHL	15	1	0	1	18	—	—	—	—	—
2013–14	Wilkes–Barre/Scranton Penguins	AHL	71	22	25	47	72	17	4	6	10	20
2014–15	Wilkes–Barre/Scranton Penguins	AHL	72	16	28	44	62	8	3	2	5	12
2015–16	Wilkes–Barre/Scranton Penguins	AHL	75	19	33	52	97	10	5	7	12	4
2016–17	Wilkes–Barre/Scranton Penguins	AHL	74	24	30	54	49	5	0	2	2	4
2017–18	Wilkes–Barre/Scranton Penguins	AHL	31	5	14	19	31	3	0	0	0	6
AHL totals			722	211	329	540	980	100	23	51	74	101
NHL totals			630	61	96	157	723	16	3	2	5	10

Awards and achievements
Preceded by Jason MacDonald Joey Mormina	Captain of the Wilkes-Barre/Scranton Penguins; 2002–04 (shared with); Kris Beech (2003–04); Patrick Boileau (2003–04) 2013–2018	Succeeded by Rob Scuderi Garrett Wilson
