= Kris Beech =

Canadian ice hockey player (born 1981)

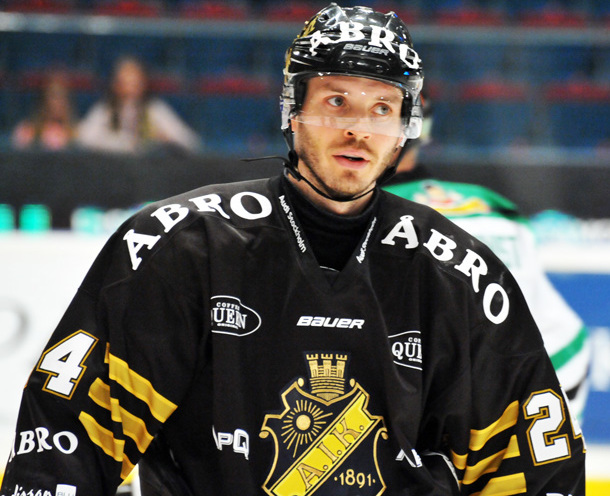
- Beech with AIK in 2013
- Born: February 5, 1981 (age 45) Salmon Arm, British Columbia, Canada
- Height: 6 ft 2 in (188 cm)
- Weight: 208 lb (94 kg; 14 st 12 lb)
- Position: Centre
- Shot: Left
- Played for: Washington Capitals; Pittsburgh Penguins; Nashville Predators; Columbus Blue Jackets; Vancouver Canucks; HV71; Genève-Servette HC; Lukko; HC Pardubice; AIK; Straubing Tigers; Vienna Capitals; HC TWK Innsbruck; Belfast Giants
- NHL draft: 7th overall, 1999; Washington Capitals
- Playing career: 1996–2016

Kristopher Beech (born February 5, 1981) is a Canadian former professional ice hockey centre who played in the National Hockey League (NHL). Beech was born in Salmon Arm, British Columbia, but grew up in Sicamous, British Columbia.

== Playing career ==
Beech was drafted 7th overall in the 1999 NHL entry draft by the Washington Capitals. At the time he was playing for the Calgary Hitmen of the WHL. Beech was traded to the Pittsburgh Penguins in July 2001 with Michal Sivek, Ross Lupaschuk, and future considerations for Jaromir Jagr and Frantisek Kucera.

Beech appeared in 79 games for the Penguins, recording 10 goals and 15 assists for 25 points. Disappointed with his development, the Penguins traded Beech on September 9, 2005 to the Nashville Predators for a conditional draft pick. Beech returned to the Capitals organization on March 9, 2006, having been traded, along with a first-round pick, for defenseman Brendan Witt. He was sent down to the Hershey Bears to join their AHL playoff campaign and helped them to a Calder Cup victory against the Milwaukee Admirals.

On January 10, 2008, Beech was claimed off waivers from Columbus by the Vancouver Canucks. However, on January 23, 2008, after just four games with the Canucks in which he recorded one goal and one assist, Beech was subsequently placed on waivers and claimed by the Washington Capitals. Before playing a single game with Washington, Beech was once again placed on waivers, which led to him being re-acquired by the Pittsburgh Penguins, Beech's fourth team in the month of January.

On October 10, 2008, Beech signed a one-year contract with the Swedish Elitserien team HV71. He joined his new team three days later.

On April 28, 2009, Beech was re-signed to a two-year contract extension with HV71. Prior to the 2009–10 season on September 4, 2009, Beech signed a six-week loan contract with HC Genève-Servette. In his eight games with Genève-Servette, he scored two goals. On October 14, 2009, Beech was returned to HV71.

On May 25, 2011, the Finnish club Lukko Rauma announced that Beech signed a one-year contract with the team. Upon completion of the season with Lukko, Beech was again on the move within Europe signing a one-year contract with Czech team HC Pardubice on June 25, 2012. During the 2012–13 season, on December 4, 2012, Beech transferred to join AIK of the Elitserien for the remainder of the season.

In the 2013–14 season, Beech moved to Germany to play in the Deutsche Eishockey Liga with the Straubing Tigers. He scored 24 points in 36 games, before opting to transfer to the Austrian EBEL league with the Vienna Capitals for their playoff run. On July 3, 2014, Beech decided to remain in the EBEL, signing a one-year contract with HC TWK Innsbruck.

On July 2, 2015, Beech signed a one-year contract with Northern Irish club, the Belfast Giants of the British Elite Ice Hockey League (EIHL).

== Personal ==
During the offseason, Beech is a guest instructor at the Sicamous Hockey School, located in Sicamous, British Columbia. Since 2017, Beech has worked with various hockey teams and organizations, including the Vancouver Giants and Delta, British Columbia's Delta Hockey Academy, as a mindfulness training coach.

Beech founded Aimability, a performance and health network, in 2017.

== Career statistics ==
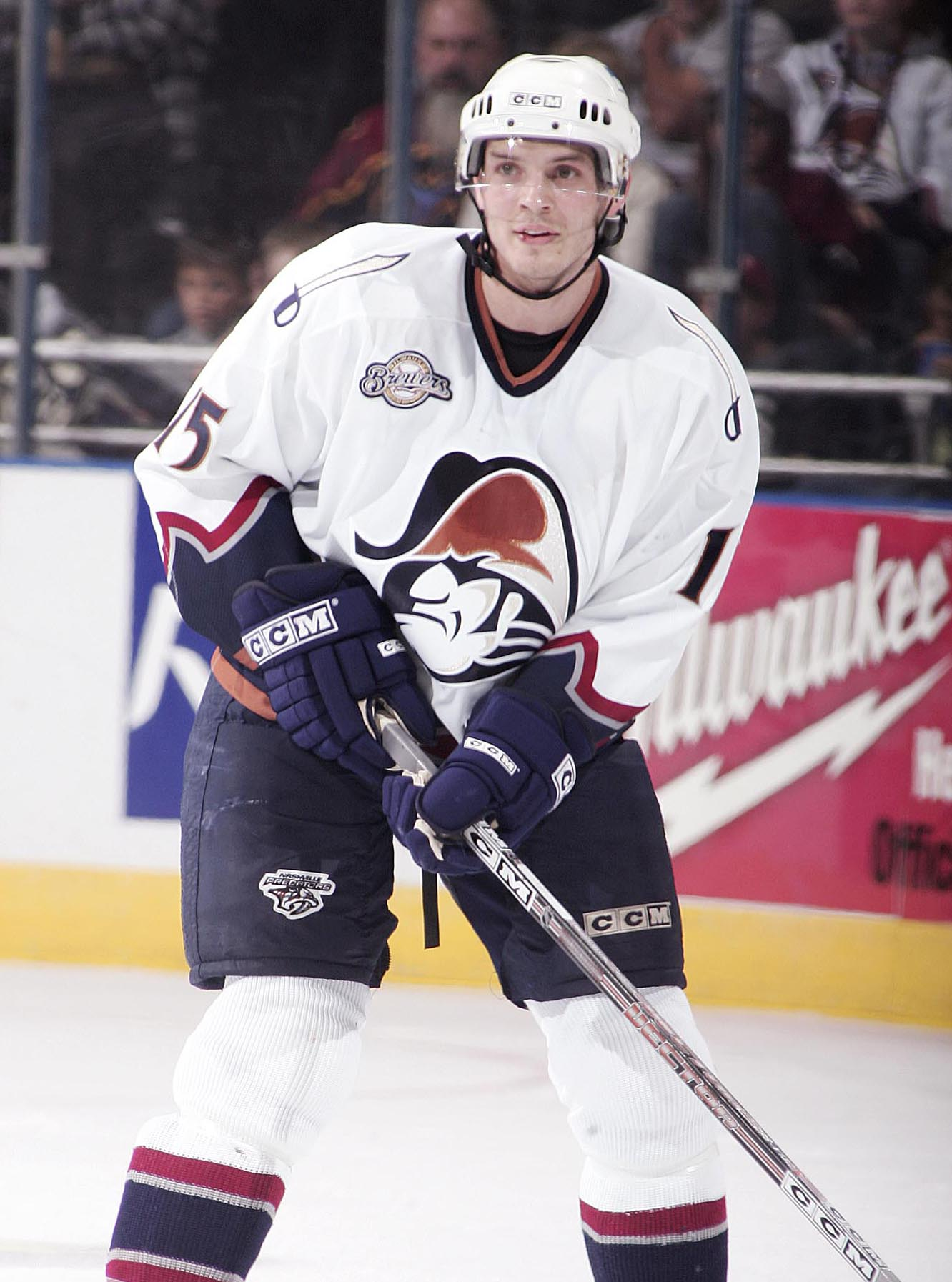
Beech with the Milwaukee Admirals in 2005

			Regular season					Playoffs
Season	Team	League	GP	G	A	Pts	PIM	GP	G	A	Pts	PIM
1996–97	Sicamous Eagles	KIJHL	49	34	36	70	80	—	—	—	—	—
1996–97	Calgary Hitmen	WHL	8	1	1	2	0	—	—	—	—	—
1997–98	Calgary Hitmen	WHL	58	10	15	25	24	12	4	5	9	14
1998–99	Calgary Hitmen	WHL	68	26	41	67	103	6	1	4	5	8
1999–2000	Calgary Hitmen	WHL	66	32	54	86	99	5	3	5	8	16
2000–01	Calgary Hitmen	WHL	40	22	44	66	103	10	2	8	10	26
2000–01	Washington Capitals	NHL	4	0	0	0	2	—	—	—	—	—
2001–02	Pittsburgh Penguins	NHL	79	10	15	25	45	—	—	—	—	—
2002–03	Wilkes–Barre/Scranton Penguins	AHL	50	19	24	43	76	5	1	1	2	0
2002–03	Pittsburgh Penguins	NHL	12	0	1	1	6	—	—	—	—	—
2003–04	Wilkes–Barre/Scranton Penguins	AHL	53	20	25	45	97	22	9	6	15	4
2003–04	Pittsburgh Penguins	NHL	4	0	1	1	6	—	—	—	—	—
2004–05	Wilkes–Barre/Scranton Penguins	AHL	68	14	48	62	146	11	4	6	10	14
2005–06	Milwaukee Admirals	AHL	22	10	13	23	30	—	—	—	—	—
2005–06	Nashville Predators	NHL	5	1	2	3	0	—	—	—	—	—
2005–06	Washington Capitals	NHL	5	0	0	0	4	—	—	—	—	—
2005–06	Hershey Bears	AHL	10	8	6	14	6	21	14	14	28	30
2006–07	Washington Capitals	NHL	64	8	18	26	46	—	—	—	—	—
2007–08	Syracuse Crunch	AHL	16	5	10	15	22	—	—	—	—	—
2007–08	Columbus Blue Jackets	NHL	16	5	4	9	2	—	—	—	—	—
2007–08	Vancouver Canucks	NHL	4	1	1	2	0	—	—	—	—	—
2007–08	Pittsburgh Penguins	NHL	5	0	0	0	2	—	—	—	—	—
2008–09	HV71	SEL	45	17	17	34	116	18	3	3	6	22
2009–10	Genève–Servette HC	NLA	8	2	0	2	12	—	—	—	—	—
2009–10	HV71	SEL	44	4	8	12	56	16	5	2	7	10
2010–11	HV71	SEL	48	14	17	31	50	4	0	0	0	6
2011–12	Lukko	SM-l	59	15	20	35	79	3	0	0	0	4
2012–13	HC Pardubice	ELH	21	2	6	8	16	—	—	—	—	—
2012–13	AIK	SEL	23	3	2	5	16	—	—	—	—	—
2013–14	Straubing Tigers	DEL	36	8	16	24	2	—	—	—	—	—
2013–14	Vienna Capitals	EBEL	2	1	3	4	4	5	2	0	2	14
2014–15	HC TWK Innsbruck	EBEL	51	9	17	26	83	—	—	—	—	—
2015–16	Belfast Giants	EIHL	64	25	25	50	84	2	0	1	1	0
NHL totals			198	25	42	67	113	—	—	—	—	—
AHL totals			245	84	145	229	395	59	28	27	55	47
SEL totals			160	38	44	82	238	38	8	5	13	38

== Awards ==
- 1998-99: Played in CHL Top Prospects Game
- 1998-99: Ed Chynoweth Cup winner, Calgary Hitmen (WHL)
- 2003-04: Team MVP, Wilkes-Barre/Scranton Penguins (AHL)
- 2004-05: Team MVP, Wilkes-Barre/Scranton Penguins (AHL)
- 2005-06: Calder Cup winner, Hershey Bears (AHL)
- 2008-09: Playoff silver medal, HV71 (SEL)
- 2009-10: Swedish Champion, HV71 (SEL)

Awards and achievements
Preceded by Nick Boynton	Washington Capitals first-round draft pick 1999	Succeeded by Brian Sutherby
Preceded by Tom Kostopoulos	Captain of the Wilkes-Barre/Scranton Penguins; 2003-04 (shared with); Patrick Boileau; Tom Kostopoulos	Succeeded by Alain Nasreddine
