= Wilkes-Barre/Scranton Penguins =

American Hockey League team in Wilkes-Barre, Pennsylvania

- City: Wilkes-Barre Township, Pennsylvania, U.S.
- League: American Hockey League
- Conference: Eastern
- Division: Atlantic
- Founded: 1981
- Home arena: Mohegan Arena at Casey Plaza
- Colors: Black, gold, white, red
- Mascot: Tux
- Owners: Ronald Burkle; Mario Lemieux
- General manager: Jason Spezza
- Head coach: Kirk MacDonald
- Captain: Phil Kemp
- Media: Wilkes-Barre Times Leader; Scranton Times-Tribune; SportsNet Pittsburgh; WILK Newsradio; AHL.TV (Internet)
- Affiliates: Pittsburgh Penguins (NHL); Florida Everblades (ECHL)

Franchise history
- 1981–1988: Fredericton Express
- 1988–1993: Halifax Citadels
- 1993–1996: Cornwall Aces
- 1999–present: Wilkes-Barre/Scranton Penguins

Championships
- Regular season titles: 2: (2010–11, 2016–17)
- Division titles: 4: (2005–06, 2007–08, 2010–11, 2016–17)
- Conference titles: 3: (2001, 2004, 2008)
- Calder Cups: 0

The Wilkes-Barre/Scranton Penguins (sometimes known as the WBS Penguins) are a professional ice hockey team based in Wilkes-Barre, Pennsylvania. They are the American Hockey League (AHL) affiliate of the National Hockey League's Pittsburgh Penguins. They play at the Mohegan Arena at Casey Plaza in Wilkes-Barre Township, Pennsylvania. They have won the Macgregor Kilpatrick Trophy twice for having the best record in the regular season.

== History ==
The Pittsburgh Penguins' top minor league affiliate throughout the 1990s was the Cleveland Lumberjacks of the IHL. However, in the mid-1990s, the IHL began moving away from being a developmental league and more towards being an independent minor league. For this reason, the Penguins wanted their top minor league affiliate in the AHL. The Penguins purchased the dormant Cornwall Aces AHL franchise from the Colorado Avalanche in 1996, but left the team inactive until the 1999–2000 season due to construction delays at their intended home–a new arena in Wilkes-Barre Township. The team is affectionately referred to as the "Baby Penguins" by fans. Their mascot is Tux the penguin, who wears number No. 99 in reference to the team's first season, in 1999.

The Penguins have gone to the Calder Cup final three times but have never won the championship. The team went all the way to the finals in their second season, losing to the Saint John Flames in six games. The Penguins returned to the finals in their fifth season, but were swept by the Milwaukee Admirals. They most recently made it to the finals in 2008 by way of beating the Portland Pirates in a seven-game series in the Eastern Conference finals. They went on to play the Chicago Wolves in the final, but lost the series in six games.

The WBS Penguins won the Macgregor Kilpatrick Trophy for the best finish in the regular season, in 2011, with 117 points. Goaltender Brad Thiessen was named the recipient of the Aldege "Baz" Bastien Memorial Award, an award given to the AHL's most outstanding goaltender for each season. He posted a record of 35–8–1 in 46 appearances, along with a 1.94 goals-against-average and a .922 save percentage. Head coach John Hynes won the Louis A. R. Pieri Memorial Award, awarded to the most outstanding AHL coach of the season. Despite the best regular season finish in team history, the Penguins were eliminated in the second round of the 2011 playoffs by the Charlotte Checkers in six games.

The Penguins have made the playoffs in all but four seasons of their existence. The Penguins held a playoff streak of 16 seasons from the 2002–03 season to the 2017–18 season.

Prior to the 2009–10 season, they held the inaugural Penguins Black and Gold Game, an intra-squad game which featured members of the Pittsburgh and Wilkes-Barre/Scranton Penguins and was the first ever head-to-head meeting between Sidney Crosby and Evgeni Malkin. The game was a complete sellout and tickets never reached the general public. The Penguins organization held its second Black and Gold Game prior to the 2010–11 season on September 19, 2010.

In 2009, they also spawned an affiliated youth level organization, the Wilkes-Barre Junior Pens. The team is based out of the Ice Rink at Coal Street Park, which also serves as a practice facility for the Penguins.

The Penguins' biggest rivals had been the Philadelphia Phantoms, the AHL affiliate of Pennsylvania's other NHL team, the Philadelphia Flyers. After that team moved to Glens Falls, New York, (as the Adirondack Phantoms) the Hershey Bears, also located in Pennsylvania, became the major rivals of the Penguins (they are currently the AHL affiliate of another rival of the Pittsburgh Penguins, the Washington Capitals). In 2014, the Adirondack Phantoms relocated back to eastern Pennsylvania as the Lehigh Valley Phantoms.

== Season-by-season results ==
Regular season												Playoffs					
Season	Games	Won	Lost	Tied	OTL	SOL	Points	PCT	Goals for	Goals against	Standing	Year	Prelims	1st round	2nd round	3rd round	Finals
1999–00	80	23	43	9	5	—	60	.375	236	306	5th, Empire State Div.	2000	—	Did not qualify			
2000–01	80	36	33	9	2	—	83	.519	252	248	2nd, Mid-Atlantic Div.	2001	—	W, 3–2, SYR	W, 4–2, PHI	W, 4–0, HER	L, 2–4, SJF
2001–02	80	20	44	13	3	—	56	.350	201	274	4th, South Div.	2002	Did not qualify				
2002–03	80	36	32	7	5	—	84	.525	245	248	3rd, South Div.	2003	W, 2–0, UTA	L, 1–3, GR	—	—	—
2003–04	80	34	28	10	8	—	86	.538	197	197	3rd, East Div.	2004	BYE	W, 4–3, BRP	W, 4–2, PHI	W, 4–3, HFD	L, 0–4, MIL
2004–05	80	39	27	—	7	7	92	.575	227	219	4th, East Div.	2005	—	W, 4–2, BNG	L, 1–4, PHI	—	—
2005–06	80	51	18	—	5	6	113	.706	249	178	1st, East Div.	2006	—	W, 4–3, BRP	L, 0–4, HER	—	—
2006–07	80	51	23	—	2	4	108	.675	276	221	2nd, East Div.	2007	—	W, 4–2, NOR	L, 1–4, HER	—	—
2007–08	80	47	26	—	3	4	101	.631	223	187	1st, East Div.	2008	—	W, 4–1, HER	W, 4–1, PHI	W, 4–3 POR	L, 2–4, CHI
2008–09	80	49	25	—	3	3	104	.650	274	212	3rd, East Div.	2009	—	W, 4–1, BRP	L,3–4 HER	—	—
2009–10	80	41	34	—	2	3	87	.544	239	229	3rd, East Div.	2010	—	L, 0–4, ALB	—	—	—
2010–11	80	58	21	—	0	1	117	.731	261	183	1st, East Div.	2011	—	W, 4–2, NOR	L, 2–4, CHA	—	—
2011–12	76	44	25	—	2	5	95	.625	235	215	2nd, East Div.	2012	—	W, 3–2, HER	L, 3–4, STJ	—	—
2012–13	76	42	30	—	2	2	88	.579	185	178	3rd, East Div.	2013	—	W, 3–0, BNG	W, 4–3, PRO	L, 1–4, SYR	—
2013–14	76	42	26	—	3	5	92	.605	206	185	6th, Eastern Conf.	2014	—	W, 3–1, BNG	W, 4–3, PRO	L, 2–4, STJ	—
2014–15	76	45	24	—	3	4	97	.638	212	163	4th, Eastern Conf.	2015	—	W, 3–0, SYR	L, 1–4, MCH	—	—
2015–16	76	43	27	—	4	2	92	.605	230	203	3rd, Atlantic Div.	2016	—	W, 3–0, PRO	L, 3–4, HER	—	—
2016–17	76	51	20	—	3	2	107	.704	247	170	1st, Atlantic Div.	2017	—	L, 2–3, PRO	—	—	—
2017–18	76	45	22	—	6	3	99	.651	252	223	2nd, Atlantic Div.	2018	—	L, 0–3, CHA	—	—	—
2018–19	76	36	30	—	7	3	82	.539	232	228	6th, Atlantic Div.	2019	—	Did not qualify			
2019–20	63	29	26	—	3	5	66	.524	164	193	5th, Atlantic Div.	2020	—	Season cancelled due to the COVID-19 pandemic			
2020–21	32	13	13	—	4	2	32	.500	92	107	5th, North Div.	2021	—	No playoffs were held			
2021–22	76	35	33	—	4	4	78	.513	209	225	4th, Atlantic Div.	2022	W, 2–1, HER	L, 0–3, SPR	—	—	—
2022–23	72	26	32	—	8	6	66	.458	191	224	8th, Atlantic Div.	2023	Did not qualify				
2023–24	72	39	24	—	8	1	87	.604	211	194	3rd, Atlantic Div.	2024	L, 0–2, LV	—	—	—	—
2024–25	72	40	24	—	7	1	88	.611	244	215	4th, Atlantic Div.	2025	L, 0–2, LV	—	—	—	—
2025–26	72	46	17	—	7	2	101	.701	243	186	2nd, Atlantic Div.	2026	BYE	W, 3–1, HER	W, 3–2, SPR	L, 2–4, TOR	—

Won Macgregor Kilpatrick Trophy for the best record in the regular season
Round not held

== Players ==
=== Current roster ===
Updated November 1, 2026.

No.	Nat	Player	Pos	S/G	Age	Acquired	Birthplace	Contract
30	(Finland)	Joel Blomqvist	G	L	24	2023	Nykarleby, Finland	Pittsburgh
26	(United States)	Tristan Broz	C	L	24	2024	Bloomington, Minnesota	Pittsburgh
45	(Canada)	Harrison Brunicke	D	R	20	2025	Johannesburg, South Africa	Pittsburgh
84	(Canada)	Atley Calvert (A)	C	R	23	2024	Moose Jaw, Saskatchewan	Pittsburgh
53	(Canada)	Lucas Ciona	LW	L	23	2026	Edmonton, Alberta	W-B/Scranton
83	(Canada)	Brayden Edwards	C	R	21	2025	Abbotsford, British Columbia	W-B/Scranton
43	(Sweden)	Melvin Fernström	RW	R	20	2026	Bålsta, Sweden	Pittsburgh
33	(Canada)	Taylor Gauthier	G	R	25	2022	Calgary, Alberta	Pittsburgh
13	(Sweden)	David Gustafsson	C	L	26	2026	Tingsryd, Sweden	Pittsburgh
50	(Canada)	Finn Harding	D	R	21	2025	Toronto, Ontario	Pittsburgh
48	(Canada)	Rafael Harvey-Pinard	LW	L	27	2025	Jonquière, Quebec	W-B/Scranton
85	(United States)	Avery Hayes (A)	RW	R	24	2023	Westland, Michigan	Pittsburgh
40	(Canada)	Tanner Howe	LW	L	20	2026	Prince Albert, Saskatchewan	Pittsburgh
70	(Russia)	Mikhail Ilyin	LW	L	21	2026	Cherepovets, Russia	Pittsburgh
3	(United States)	Ryan Johnson	D	L	25	2026	Irvine, California	Pittsburgh
52	(United States)	Phil Kemp (C)	D	R	27	2025	Greenwich, Connecticut	Pittsburgh
4	(United States)	Jake Livanavage	D	L	22	2026	Gilbert, Arizona	Pittsburgh
24	(United States)	Hugh McGing	LW	L	28	2026	Chicago, Illinois	W-B/Scranton
2	(United States)	Rutger McGroarty	LW	L	22	2024	Lincoln, Nebraska	Pittsburgh
8	(Slovakia)	Oliver Okuliar	RW	L	26	2026	Trenčín, Slovakia	Pittsburgh
38	(Canada)	Owen Pickering	D	L	22	2023	St. Adolphe, Manitoba	Pittsburgh
44	(United States)	Chase Pietila	D	R	22	2025	Howell, Michigan	Pittsburgh
74	(United States)	Daniel Russell	C	L	24	2026	Williamsburg, Michigan	W-B/Scranton
23	(Canada)	Bill Zonnon	C	L	20	2026	Montreal, Quebec	Pittsburgh

=== Team captains ===
- John Slaney, Stephen Leach & Tyler Wright, 1999–2000
- Sven Butenschon & John Slaney, 2000–01
- Jason MacDonald, 2001–02
- Tom Kostopoulos, 2002–03
- Patrick Boileau, Kris Beech & Tom Kostopoulos, 2003–04
- Rob Scuderi, 2004–05
- Alain Nasreddine, 2004–06
- Micki DuPont, 2006–07
- Nathan Smith, 2007–08
- David Gove, 2008–09
- Wyatt Smith, 2009–10
- Ryan Craig, 2010–12
- Joey Mormina, 2012–13
- Tom Kostopoulos, 2013–18
- Garrett Wilson, 2018–19
- David Warsofsky, 2019–20
- Josh Currie, 2021
- Taylor Fedun, 2021–2024
- Phil Kemp, 2025–present

=== American Hockey League Hall of Famers ===
AHL Hall of Fame Honored Members
Name	Seasons	Induction Year
Dennis Bonvie	1999-2001, 2005-08 (player)	2024
Michael Leighton	2017-18 (player)	2025
John Slaney	1999-2001 (player)	2014

=== Notable alumni ===
Players listed have played at least 100 games with the Penguins and 100 games in the NHL.

- Josh Archibald
- Colby Armstrong
- Kris Beech
- Paul Bissonnette
- Teddy Blueger
- Dennis Bonvie
- Robert Bortuzzo
- Jesse Boulerice
- Wade Brookbank
- Sven Butenschon
- Daniel Carcillo
- Sebastien Caron
- Erik Christensen
- Ryan Craig
- Simon Despres
- Brian Dumoulin
- Deryk Engelland
- Marc-Andre Fleury
- Brian Gibbons
- Alex Goligoski
- Scott Harrington
- Tristan Jarry
- Dustin Jeffrey
- Nick Johnson
- David Koci
- Tom Kostopoulos
- Tom Kuhnhackl
- Mark Letestu
- Ben Lovejoy
- Jayson Megna
- Josef Melichar
- Matt Murray
- Brooks Orpik
- Michel Ouellet
- Toby Petersen
- Derrick Pouliot
- Carter Rowney
- Rob Scuderi
- Dominik Simon
- Brian Strait
- Oskar Sundqvist
- Tomas Surovy
- Jeff Taffe
- Maxime Talbot
- Eric Tangradi
- Zach Trotman
- Joe Vitale
- Ryan Whitney
- Tim Wallace

== Team records ==
Single season
Goals: Chris Minard, 34 (2008–09)
Assists: Jeff Taffe and Janne Pesonen, 50 (2008–09)
Points: Janne Pesonen, 82 (2008–09)
Penalty minutes: Dennis Bonvie, 431 (2005–06)
Goaltending wins: Brad Thiessen, 35 (2010–11)
GAA: Jeff Zatkoff 1.93 (2012–13)
SV%: Rich Parent (2000–01), Dany Sabourin (2005–06) and Brad Thiessen (2010–11), .922

Career
Career goals: Tom Kostopoulos, 181
Career assists: Tom Kostopoulos, 269
Career points: Tom Kostopoulos, 450
Career penalty minutes: Dennis Bonvie, 1081
Career goaltending wins: John Curry, 103
Career shutouts: Brad Thiessen, 17
Career games: Tom Kostopoulos, 627

== AHL records ==
As of the 2009–10 AHL Season. Data from the AHL Hall of Fame Website.

=== Team ===
Most road wins, 80-game season: 28 (2010–2011) (tied)

Longest road winning streak (one season): 13 games (October 9 – December 3, 2005) (tied)

Longest road winning streak (overall): 15 games (April 10 – December 3, 2005)

=== Player ===
Most points by a defenseman, career: John Slaney, 486 (Baltimore, Portland, Cornwall, Wilkes-Barre/Scranton, Philadelphia)

Most goals by a defenseman, career: John Slaney, 157

Most goals by a defenseman, season: John Slaney, 30 (1999–2000)

Most PIM, career: Dennis Bonvie, 4,104 (Cape Breton, Hamilton, Portland, Philadelphia, Wilkes-Barre/Scranton, Providence, Binghamton, Hershey)

Most PIM, game: Steve Parsons, 64 (March 17, 2002 vs. Syracuse)

== AHL awards and trophies ==
Per the AHL Hall of Fame:

Macgregor Kilpatrick Trophy (AHL regular season champions)

- 2016–17
- 2010–11

Frank Mathers Trophy (Eastern Conference regular season champions from 2004 to 2011)

- 2010–11

Richard F. Canning Trophy (Eastern Conference playoff champions)

- 2007–08
- 2003–04

F. G. "Teddy" Oke Trophy (East Division regular season champions from 2002 to 2011)

- 2010–11
- 2007–08
- 2005–06

Robert W. Clarke Trophy (Western Conference playoff champions)

- 2000–01

Eddie Shore Award (best defenseman)

- John Slaney: 2000–01

Aldege "Baz" Bastien Memorial Award (best goaltender)

- Matt Murray: 2014–15
- Brad Thiessen: 2010–11
- Dany Sabourin: 2005–06

Harry "Hap" Holmes Memorial Award (goalies with lowest goals against avg.)

- Tristan Jarry and Casey DeSmith: 2016–17
- Matt Murray and Jeff Zatkoff: 2014–15
- Jeff Deslauriers and Eric Hartzell: 2013–14
- Brad Thiessen and Jeff Zatkoff: 2012–13
- Brad Thiessen and John Curry: 2010–11
- Dany Sabourin: 2005–06

Yanick Dupre Memorial Award (AHL Man of the Year Service)

- Matt Carkner: 2006–07

Louis A.R. Pieri Memorial Award (coach of the year)

- John Hynes: 2010–11

== See also ==
- Wilkes-Barre/Scranton Knights
