= Alain Nasreddine =

Canadian ice hockey player and coach

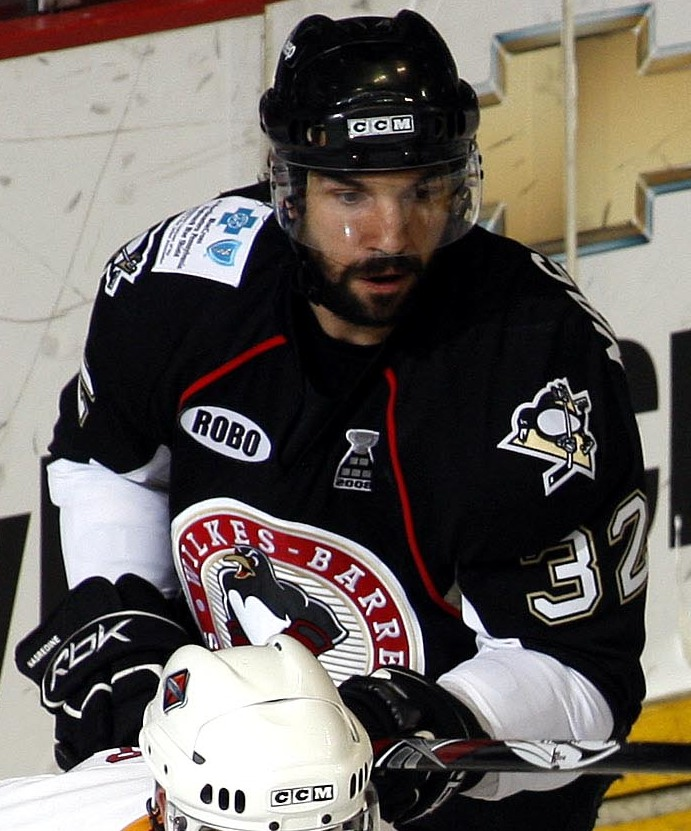
- Nasreddine with the Wilkes-Barre/Scranton Penguins in 2008
- Born: July 10, 1975 (age 51) Montreal, Quebec, Canada
- Height: 6 ft 2 in (188 cm)
- Weight: 201 lb (91 kg; 14 st 5 lb)
- Position: Defence
- Shot: Left
- Played for: Chicago Blackhawks; Montreal Canadiens; New York Islanders; Pittsburgh Penguins
- Coached for: New Jersey Devils
- NHL draft: 135th overall, 1993; Florida Panthers
- Playing career: 1995–2010
- Coaching career: 2010–present

Alain Jean-Paul Mohammed Nasreddine (born July 10, 1975) is a Canadian professional ice hockey coach and former player who is an assistant coach for the Dallas Stars of the National Hockey League (NHL). He played as a defenceman in the NHL.

== Playing career ==
Nasreddine played junior ice hockey with the Drummondville Voltigeurs and Chicoutimi Saguenéens of the Quebec Major Junior Hockey League (QMJHL). He was selected in the sixth round, 135th overall by the Florida Panthers in the 1993 NHL entry draft.

Nasreddine has played for six different NHL organizations, but mostly played in the minor leagues. He saw very limited NHL duty: he played fewer than 10 games each for the Chicago Blackhawks, Montreal Canadiens, and New York Islanders, but played most of his time in the NHL for the Pittsburgh Penguins, totaling 74 career NHL games. He scored his first and only NHL goal on December 16, 2006, as the Penguins fell 6–3 to the Canadiens in Montreal. In 2008, he signed with the Sinupret Ice Tigers of the Deutsche Eishockey Liga, and after two seasons in the DEL was released on June 12, 2010, following the 2009–10 season.

== Coaching career ==
On August 20, 2010, the Wilkes-Barre/Scranton Penguins of the American Hockey League (AHL) named Nasreddine their new assistant coach.

On June 17, 2015, Nasreddine was named an assistant coach for the New Jersey Devils. On December 3, 2019, he was named interim head coach of the Devils. On October 2, 2020, he was retained as an assistant coach of the Devils after the hiring of Lindy Ruff as head coach on July 9, and served as assistant coach until his contract was not renewed on May 4, 2022.

On July 1, 2022, Nasreddine was named as assistant coach under head coach Peter DeBoer of the Dallas Stars.

== Personal life ==
Nasreddine grew up in Saint-Leonard, Quebec, the son of Akram, a Lebanese Muslim immigrant, and Francine, a French-Canadian Catholic. He has one younger brother, Samy, who was also an ice hockey player. Akram owns a pizza chain in Montreal, Pizza Madona, and has previously owned other restaurants and a convenience store. He is one of four NHL players of Lebanese descent, along with John Hanna, Ed Hatoum, and Nazem Kadri.

== Career statistics ==
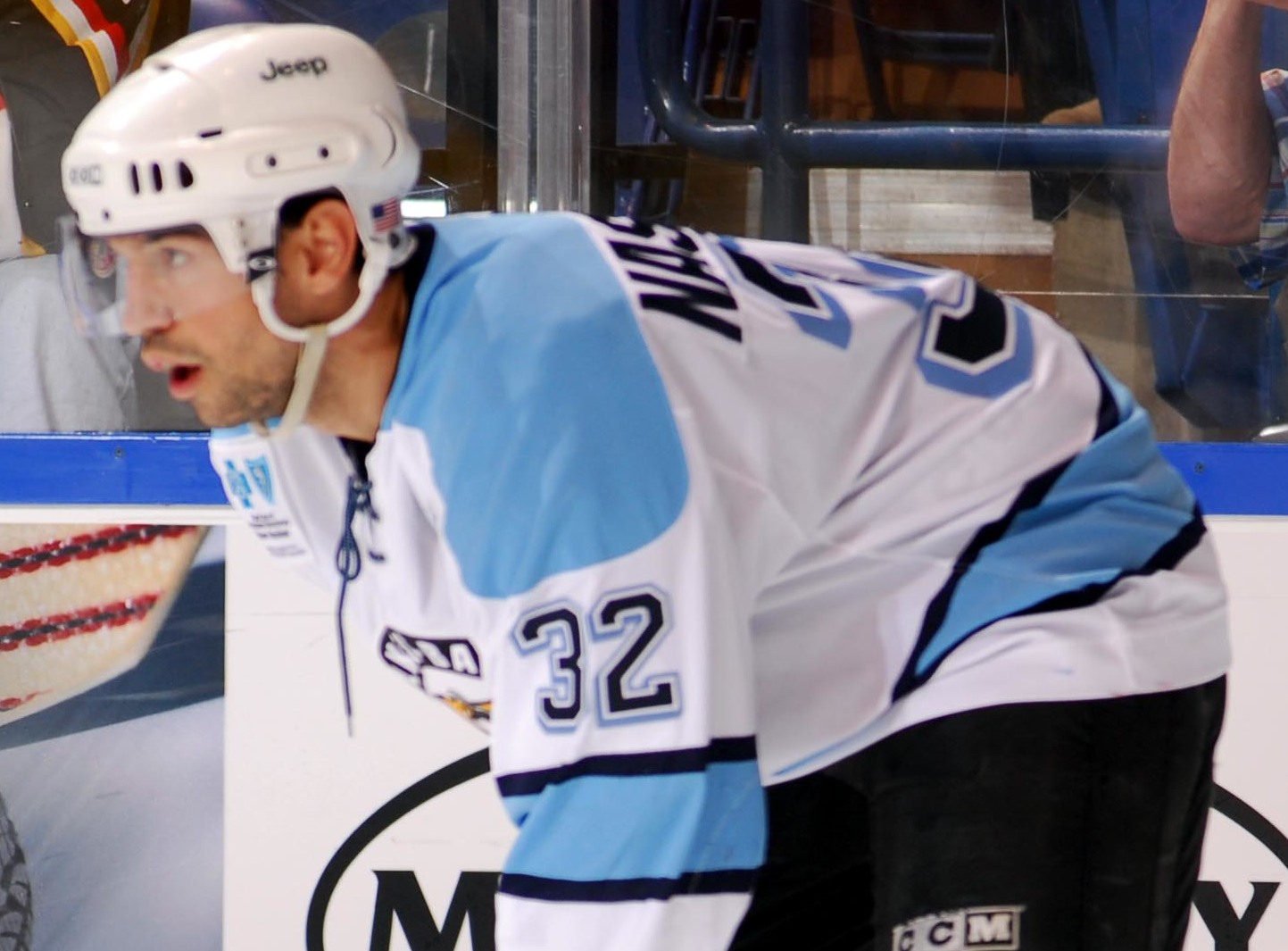
Nasreddine in 2006

| | | | Regular season | | | | | Playoffs |
| Season | Team | League | GP | G | A | Pts | PIM | GP | G | A | Pts | PIM |
|---|---|---|---|---|---|---|---|---|---|---|---|---|
| 1990–91 | Montréal–Bourassa Canadien | QMAAA | 35 | 10 | 25 | 35 | 50 | — | — | — | — | — |
| 1991–92 | Drummondville Voltigeurs | QMJHL | 61 | 1 | 9 | 10 | 78 | 4 | 0 | 0 | 0 | 17 |
| 1992–93 | Drummondville Voltigeurs | QMJHL | 64 | 0 | 14 | 14 | 137 | 10 | 0 | 1 | 1 | 36 |
| 1993–94 | Chicoutimi Saguenéens | QMJHL | 60 | 3 | 24 | 27 | 218 | 26 | 2 | 10 | 12 | 118 |
| 1994–95 | Chicoutimi Saguenéens | QMJHL | 67 | 8 | 31 | 39 | 342 | 13 | 3 | 5 | 8 | 40 |
| 1995–96 | Carolina Monarchs | AHL | 63 | 0 | 5 | 5 | 245 | — | — | — | — | — |
| 1996–97 | Carolina Monarchs | AHL | 26 | 0 | 4 | 4 | 109 | — | — | — | — | — |
| 1996–97 | Indianapolis Ice | IHL | 49 | 0 | 2 | 2 | 248 | 4 | 1 | 1 | 2 | 27 |
| 1997–98 | Indianapolis Ice | IHL | 75 | 1 | 12 | 13 | 258 | 5 | 0 | 2 | 2 | 12 |
| 1998–99 | Portland Pirates | AHL | 7 | 0 | 1 | 1 | 36 | — | — | — | — | — |
| 1998–99 | Fredericton Canadiens | AHL | 38 | 0 | 10 | 10 | 108 | 15 | 0 | 3 | 3 | 39 |
| 1998–99 | Chicago Blackhawks | NHL | 7 | 0 | 0 | 0 | 19 | — | — | — | — | — |
| 1998–99 | Montreal Canadiens | NHL | 8 | 0 | 0 | 0 | 33 | — | — | — | — | — |
| 1999–2000 | Quebec Citadelles | AHL | 59 | 1 | 6 | 7 | 178 | — | — | — | — | — |
| 1999–2000 | Hamilton Bulldogs | AHL | 11 | 0 | 0 | 0 | 12 | 10 | 1 | 1 | 2 | 14 |
| 2000–01 | Hamilton Bulldogs | AHL | 74 | 4 | 14 | 18 | 164 | — | — | — | — | — |
| 2001–02 | Hamilton Bulldogs | AHL | 79 | 7 | 10 | 17 | 154 | 12 | 1 | 3 | 4 | 22 |
| 2002–03 | Bridgeport Sound Tigers | AHL | 67 | 3 | 9 | 12 | 114 | 9 | 0 | 0 | 0 | 27 |
| 2002–03 | New York Islanders | NHL | 3 | 0 | 0 | 0 | 2 | — | — | — | — | — |
| 2003–04 | Bridgeport Sound Tigers | AHL | 53 | 1 | 6 | 7 | 70 | — | — | — | — | — |
| 2003–04 | Wilkes–Barre/Scranton Penguins | AHL | 17 | 1 | 1 | 2 | 16 | 24 | 1 | 0 | 1 | 4 |
| 2004–05 | Wilkes–Barre/Scranton Penguins | AHL | 75 | 3 | 14 | 17 | 129 | 11 | 0 | 1 | 1 | 18 |
| 2005–06 | Wilkes–Barre/Scranton Penguins | AHL | 71 | 0 | 12 | 12 | 71 | — | — | — | — | — |
| 2005–06 | Pittsburgh Penguins | NHL | 6 | 0 | 0 | 0 | 8 | — | — | — | — | — |
| 2006–07 | Wilkes–Barre/Scranton Penguins | AHL | 19 | 3 | 5 | 8 | 25 | — | — | — | — | — |
| 2006–07 | Pittsburgh Penguins | NHL | 44 | 1 | 4 | 5 | 18 | — | — | — | — | — |
| 2007–08 | Pittsburgh Penguins | NHL | 6 | 0 | 0 | 0 | 4 | — | — | — | — | — |
| 2007–08 | Wilkes–Barre/Scranton Penguins | AHL | 67 | 6 | 10 | 16 | 61 | 22 | 2 | 3 | 5 | 16 |
| 2008–09 | Sinupret Ice Tigers | DEL | 38 | 2 | 8 | 10 | 64 | 4 | 0 | 1 | 1 | 16 |
| 2009–10 | Thomas Sabo Ice Tigers | DEL | 55 | 1 | 9 | 10 | 82 | 5 | 0 | 4 | 4 | 8 |
| AHL totals | | | 726 | 29 | 107 | 136 | 1492 | 104 | 5 | 11 | 16 | 184 |
| NHL totals | | | 74 | 1 | 4 | 5 | 84 | — | — | — | — | — |

== Head coaching record ==
=== NHL ===
| Team | Year | Regular season | | | | | | Postseason | | | |
| Team | Year | G | W | L | OTL | Pts | Finish | W | L | Win% | Result |
|---|---|---|---|---|---|---|---|---|---|---|---|
| NJD | 2019–20 | 43 | 19 | 16 | 8 | (46) | 8th in Metropolitan | — | — | — | Missed playoffs |
| Total | | 43 | 19 | 16 | 8 | | | — | — | — | |

Awards and achievements
| Preceded by Rob Scuderi | Wilkes-Barre/Scranton Penguins captain 2004–06 | Succeeded by Micki Dupont |
| Preceded by John Hynes | Head coach of the New Jersey Devils (interim); 2019–20 | Succeeded by Lindy Ruff |
