= List of Colorado Avalanche draft picks =

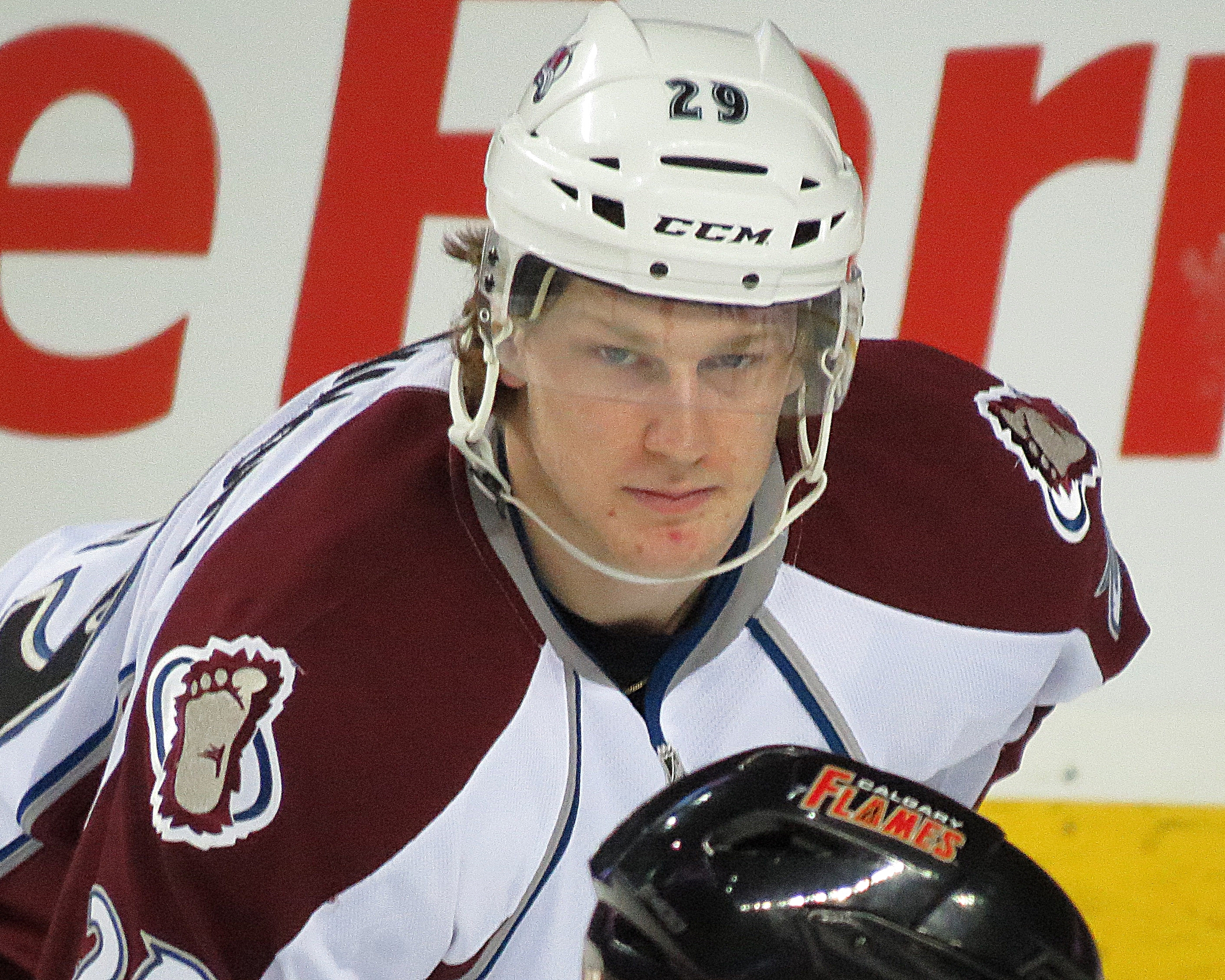
The Avalanche selected Nathan MacKinnon 1st overall in the 2013 NHL entry draft.

This is a complete list of ice hockey players who were drafted in the National Hockey League Entry Draft by the Colorado Avalanche franchise. It includes every player who was drafted, regardless of whether they played for the team. The Colorado Avalanche franchise was founded in Quebec, Canada, with the name Quebec Nordiques. In 1995, the franchise moved to Denver, Colorado, and since then has won three Stanley Cups.

== Key ==
Played at least one game with the Avalanche
Spent entire NHL career with the Avalanche

General terms and abbreviations
Term or abbreviation	Definition
Draft	The year that the player was selected
Round	The round of the draft in which the player was selected
Pick	The overall position in the draft at which the player was selected

Position abbreviations
Abbreviation	Definition
G	Goaltender
D	Defense
LW	Left wing
C	Center
RW	Right wing
F	Forward

Abbreviations for statistical columns
Abbreviation	Definition
Pos	Position
GP	Games played
G	Goals
A	Assists
Pts	Points
PIM	Penalties in minutes
W	Wins
L	Losses
T	Ties
OT	Overtime/shootout losses
GAA	Goals against average
—	Does not apply

== Draft picks ==
Statistics are complete as of the 2025–26 NHL season and show each player's career regular season totals in the NHL. Wins, losses, ties, overtime losses and goals against average apply to goaltenders and are used only for players at that position.

Draft	Round	Pick	Player	Nationality	Pos	GP	G	A	Pts	PIM	W	L	T	OT	GAA
1995	1	25	Marc Denis	Canada	G	349	0	6	6	32	112	179	28	3	3.02
1995	2	51	Nic Beaudoin	Canada	LW	—	—	—	—	—	—	—	—	—	—
1995	3	77	John Tripp	Germany	RW	43	2	7	9	35	—	—	—	—	—
1995	4	81	Tomi Kallio	Finland	RW	140	24	31	55	48	—	—	—	—	—
1995	5	129	Brent Johnson	United States	G	309	0	10	10	52	140	112	13	18	2.63
1995	6	155	John Cirjak	Canada	C	—	—	—	—	—	—	—	—	—	—
1995	7	181	Dan Smith	Canada	D	22	0	0	0	16	—	—	—	—	—
1995	8	207	Tomi Hirvonen	Finland	C	—	—	—	—	—	—	—	—	—	—
1995	9	228	Chris George	Canada	RW	—	—	—	—	—	—	—	—	—	—
1996	1	25	Peter Ratchuk	United States	D	32	1	1	2	10	—	—	—	—	—
1996	2	51	Yuri Babenko	Russia	C	3	0	0	0	0	—	—	—	—	—
1996	3	79	Mark Parrish	United States	RW	722	216	171	387	246	—	—	—	—	—
1996	4	98	Ben Storey	Canada	D	—	—	—	—	—	—	—	—	—	—
1996	4	107	Randy Petruk	Canada	G	—	—	—	—	—	—	—	—	—	—
1996	5	134	Luke Curtin	United States	LW	—	—	—	—	—	—	—	—	—	—
1996	6	146	Brian Willsie	Canada	RW	381	52	57	109	217	—	—	—	—	—
1996	6	160	Kai Fischer	Germany	G	—	—	—	—	—	—	—	—	—	—
1996	7	167	Dan Hinote	United States	RW	503	38	52	90	383	—	—	—	—	—
1996	7	176	Samuel Pahlsson	Sweden	C	798	68	131	199	356	—	—	—	—	—
1996	7	188	Roman Pylner	Czech Republic	C	—	—	—	—	—	—	—	—	—	—
1996	8	214	Matt Scorsune	United States	D	—	—	—	—	—	—	—	—	—	—
1996	9	240	Justin Clark	United States	RW	—	—	—	—	—	—	—	—	—	—
1997	1	26	Kevin Grimes	Canada	D	—	—	—	—	—	—	—	—	—	—
1997	2	53	Graham Belak	Canada	LW	—	—	—	—	—	—	—	—	—	—
1997	3	55	Rick Berry	Canada	D	197	2	13	15	314	—	—	—	—	—
1997	3	78	Ville Nieminen	Finland	LW	385	48	69	117	333	—	—	—	—	—
1997	4	87	Brad Larsen	Canada	LW	294	19	29	48	134	—	—	—	—	—
1997	5	133	Aaron Miskovich	United States	C	—	—	—	—	—	—	—	—	—	—
1997	6	161	David Aebischer	Switzerland	G	214	0	5	5	30	106	74	12	5	2.52
1997	8	217	Doug Schmidt	United States	D	—	—	—	—	—	—	—	—	—	—
1997	9	243	Kyle Kidney	United States	LW	—	—	—	—	—	—	—	—	—	—
1997	9	245	Stephen Lafleur	Canada	D	—	—	—	—	—	—	—	—	—	—
1998	1	12	Alex Tanguay	Canada	LW	1088	283	580	863	527	—	—	—	—	—
1998	1	17	Martin Škoula	Czech Republic	D	776	44	152	196	328	—	—	—	—	—
1998	1	19	Robyn Regehr	Canada	D	1090	36	163	199	972	—	—	—	—	—
1998	1	20	Scott Parker	United States	RW	308	7	14	21	699	—	—	—	—	—
1998	2	28	Ramzi Abid	Canada	LW	68	14	16	30	78	—	—	—	—	—
1998	2	38	Philippe Sauve	United States	G	32	0	0	0	23	10	14	3	0	3.45
1998	2	53	Steve Moore	Canada	C	69	5	7	12	41	—	—	—	—	—
1998	3	79	Evgeny Lazarev	Ukraine	RW	—	—	—	—	—	—	—	—	—	—
1998	5	141	K. C. Timmons	Canada	LW	—	—	—	—	—	—	—	—	—	—
1998	6	167	Alex Riazantsev	Russia	D	—	—	—	—	—	—	—	—	—	—
1999	1	25	Mikhail Kuleshov	Russia	LW	3	0	0	0	0	—	—	—	—	—
1999	2	45	Martin Grenier	Canada	D	18	1	0	1	14	—	—	—	—	—
1999	3	93	Branko Radivojevič	Slovakia	RW	393	52	68	120	252	—	—	—	—	—
1999	4	112	Sanny Lindstrom	Sweden	D	—	—	—	—	—	—	—	—	—	—
1999	4	122	Kristián Kováč	Slovakia	RW	—	—	—	—	—	—	—	—	—	—
1999	5	142	Will Magnuson	United States	D	—	—	—	—	—	—	—	—	—	—
1999	5	152	Jordan Krestanovich	Canada	C	22	0	2	2	6	—	—	—	—	—
1999	6	158	Anders Lovdahl	Sweden	C	—	—	—	—	—	—	—	—	—	—
1999	6	183	Riku Hahl	Finland	C	92	5	8	13	38	—	—	—	—	—
1999	7	212	Radim Vrbata	Czech Republic	RW	1057	284	339	623	294	—	—	—	—	—
1999	8	240	Jeff Finger	United States	D	199	17	40	57	114	—	—	—	—	—
2000	1	14	Václav Nedorost	Czech Republic	C	99	10	10	20	34	—	—	—	—	—
2000	2	47	Jared Aulin	Canada	C	17	2	2	4	0	—	—	—	—	—
2000	2	50	Sergei Soin	Russia	C	—	—	—	—	—	—	—	—	—	—
2000	2	63	Agris Saviels	Latvia	D	—	—	—	—	—	—	—	—	—	—
2000	3	88	Kurt Sauer	United States	D	357	5	28	33	250	—	—	—	—	—
2000	3	92	Sergei Klyazmin	Russia	LW	—	—	—	—	—	—	—	—	—	—
2000	4	119	Brian Fahey	United States	D	7	0	1	1	2	—	—	—	—	—
2000	5	159	John-Michael Liles	United States	D	836	87	283	370	286	—	—	—	—	—
2000	6	189	Chris Bahen	Canada	D	—	—	—	—	—	—	—	—	—	—
2000	7	221	Aaron Molnar	Canada	G	—	—	—	—	—	—	—	—	—	—
2000	8	252	Darryl Bootland	Canada	RW	32	1	2	3	85	—	—	—	—	—
2000	9	266	Sean Kotary	United States	C	—	—	—	—	—	—	—	—	—	—
2000	9	285	Blake Ward	Canada	G	—	—	—	—	—	—	—	—	—	—
2001	2	63	Peter Budaj	Slovakia	G	368	0	11	11	20	158	132	—	40	2.70
2001	3	97	Danny Bois	Canada	RW	1	0	0	0	7	—	—	—	—	—
2001	4	130	Colt King	Canada	LW	—	—	—	—	—	—	—	—	—	—
2001	5	143	František Skladaný	Slovakia	LW	—	—	—	—	—	—	—	—	—	—
2001	5	144	Cody McCormick	Canada	C	405	21	44	65	550	—	—	—	—	—
2001	5	149	Mikko Viitanen	Finland	D	—	—	—	—	—	—	—	—	—	—
2001	5	165	Pierre-Luc Emond	Canada	C	—	—	—	—	—	—	—	—	—	—
2001	6	184	Scott Horvath	United States	RW	—	—	—	—	—	—	—	—	—	—
2001	6	196	Charlie Stephens	Canada	C	8	0	2	2	4	—	—	—	—	—
2001	7	227	Marek Svatoš	Slovakia	RW	344	100	72	172	217	—	—	—	—	—
2002	1	28	Jonas Johansson	Sweden	RW	1	0	0	0	2	—	—	—	—	—
2002	2	61	Johnny Boychuk	Canada	D	725	54	152	206	331	—	—	—	—	—
2002	3	94	Eric Lundberg	United States	D	—	—	—	—	—	—	—	—	—	—
2002	4	107	Mikko Kalteva	Finland	D	—	—	—	—	—	—	—	—	—	—
2002	4	129	Tom Gilbert	United States	D	655	45	178	223	198	—	—	—	—	—
2002	5	164	Tyler Weiman	Canada	G	1	0	0	0	0	0	0	—	0	0.00
2002	6	195	Taylor Christie	Canada	D	—	—	—	—	—	—	—	—	—	—
2002	7	227	Ryan Steeves	Canada	C	—	—	—	—	—	—	—	—	—	—
2002	8	258	Sergei Shemetov	Russia	LW	—	—	—	—	—	—	—	—	—	—
2002	9	289	Sean Collins	United States	C	—	—	—	—	—	—	—	—	—	—
2003	2	63	David Liffiton	Canada	D	7	1	0	1	26	—	—	—	—	—
2003	4	131	David Svagrovsky	Czech Republic	RW	—	—	—	—	—	—	—	—	—	—
2003	5	146	Mark McCutcheon	United States	C	—	—	—	—	—	—	—	—	—	—
2003	5	163	Brad Richardson	Canada	C	869	111	143	254	443	—	—	—	—	—
2003	7	204	Linus Videll	Sweden	LW	—	—	—	—	—	—	—	—	—	—
2003	7	225	Brett Hemingway	Canada	F	—	—	—	—	—	—	—	—	—	—
2003	8	257	Darryl Yacboski	Canada	LW	—	—	—	—	—	—	—	—	—	—
2003	9	288	David Jones	Canada	RW	462	104	87	191	122	—	—	—	—	—
2004	1	21	Wojtek Wolski	Canada	LW	451	99	168	267	113	—	—	—	—	—
2004	2	55	Victor Oreskovich	Canada	RW	67	2	7	9	41	—	—	—	—	—
2004	3	72	Denis Parshin	Russia	LW	—	—	—	—	—	—	—	—	—	—
2004	5	154	Richard Demen-Willaume	Sweden	D	—	—	—	—	—	—	—	—	—	—
2004	6	184	Derek Peltier	United States	D	14	0	0	0	2	—	—	—	—	—
2004	7	215	Ian Keserich	United States	G	—	—	—	—	—	—	—	—	—	—
2004	8	239	Brandon Yip	Canada	RW	174	29	27	56	130	—	—	—	—	—
2004	8	249	J. D. Corbin	United States	LW	—	—	—	—	—	—	—	—	—	—
2004	9	281	Steve McClellan	United States	D	—	—	—	—	—	—	—	—	—	—
2005	2	34	Ryan Stoa	United States	C	40	4	3	7	20	—	—	—	—	—
2005	2	44	Paul Stastny	United States	C	1145	293	529	822	500	—	—	—	—	—
2005	2	47	Tom Fritsche	United States	LW	—	—	—	—	—	—	—	—	—	—
2005	2	52	Chris Durand	Canada	C	—	—	—	—	—	—	—	—	—	—
2005	3	88	T. J. Hensick	United States	C	112	12	26	38	18	—	—	—	—	—
2005	4	124	Ray Macias	United States	D	8	0	1	1	2	—	—	—	—	—
2005	6	166	Jason Lynch	Canada	D	—	—	—	—	—	—	—	—	—	—
2005	6	168	Justin Mercier	United States	C	9	1	1	2	0	—	—	—	—	—
2005	7	222	Kyle Cumiskey	Canada	D	139	9	26	35	48	—	—	—	—	—
2006	1	18	Chris Stewart	Canada	RW	668	160	162	322	750	—	—	—	—	—
2006	2	51	Nigel Williams	United States	D	—	—	—	—	—	—	—	—	—	—
2006	2	59	Codey Burki	Canada	C	—	—	—	—	—	—	—	—	—	—
2006	3	81	Mike Carman	United States	C	—	—	—	—	—	—	—	—	—	—
2006	4	110	Kevin Montgomery	United States	D	—	—	—	—	—	—	—	—	—	—
2006	7	201	Billy Sauer	United States	G	—	—	—	—	—	—	—	—	—	—
2007	1	14	Kevin Shattenkirk	United States	D	952	103	381	484	544	—	—	—	—	—
2007	2	45	Colby Cohen	United States	D	3	0	0	0	4	—	—	—	—	—
2007	2	49	Trevor Cann	Canada	G	—	—	—	—	—	—	—	—	—	—
2007	2	55	T. J. Galiardi	United States	C	321	44	61	105	136	—	—	—	—	—
2007	4	105	Brad Malone	Canada	LW	217	14	18	32	206	—	—	—	—	—
2007	4	113	Kent Patterson	United States	G	—	—	—	—	—	—	—	—	—	—
2007	5	135	Paul Carey	United States	LW	100	8	8	16	20	—	—	—	—	—
2007	6	155	Jens Hellgren	Sweden	D	—	—	—	—	—	—	—	—	—	—
2007	7	195	Johan Alcen	Sweden	C	—	—	—	—	—	—	—	—	—	—
2008	2	50	Cameron Gaunce	Canada	D	37	3	6	9	47	—	—	—	—	—
2008	2	61	Peter Delmas	Canada	G	—	—	—	—	—	—	—	—	—	—
2008	4	110	Kelsey Tessier	Canada	C	—	—	—	—	—	—	—	—	—	—
2008	5	140	Mark Olver	Canada	C	74	10	12	22	39	—	—	—	—	—
2008	6	167	Joel Chouinard	Canada	D	—	—	—	—	—	—	—	—	—	—
2008	6	170	Jonas Holos	Norway	D	39	0	6	6	10	—	—	—	—	—
2008	7	200	Nathan Condon	United States	C	—	—	—	—	—	—	—	—	—	—
2009	1	3	Matt Duchene	Canada	C	1195	387	549	936	306	—	—	—	—	—
2009	2	33	Ryan O'Reilly	Canada	C	1233	328	570	898	216	—	—	—	—	—
2009	2	49	Stefan Elliott	Canada	D	87	8	17	25	16	—	—	—	—	—
2009	3	64	Tyson Barrie	Canada	D	822	110	398	508	263	—	—	—	—	—
2009	5	124	Kieran Millan	Canada	G	—	—	—	—	—	—	—	—	—	—
2009	6	154	Brandon Maxwell	United States	G	—	—	—	—	—	—	—	—	—	—
2009	7	184	Gus Young	United States	D	—	—	—	—	—	—	—	—	—	—
2010	1	17	Joey Hishon	Canada	C	13	1	1	2	0	—	—	—	—	—
2010	2	49	Calvin Pickard	Canada	G	191	0	4	4	6	74	77	—	14	2.95
2010	3	71	Michael Bournival	Canada	LW	113	12	10	22	24	—	—	—	—	—
2010	4	95	Stephen Silas	Canada	D	—	—	—	—	—	—	—	—	—	—
2010	4	107	Sami Aittokallio	Finland	G	2	0	0	0	0	0	1	—	0	3.37
2010	5	137	Troy Rutkowski	Canada	D	—	—	—	—	—	—	—	—	—	—
2010	5	139	Luke Walker	United States	RW	—	—	—	—	—	—	—	—	—	—
2010	7	197	Luke Moffatt	United States	RW	—	—	—	—	—	—	—	—	—	—
2011	1	2	Gabriel Landeskog	Sweden	LW	798	262	344	606	648	—	—	—	—	—
2011	1	11	Duncan Siemens	Canada	D	20	1	1	2	25	—	—	—	—	—
2011	4	93	Joachim Nermark	Sweden	C	—	—	—	—	—	—	—	—	—	—
2011	5	123	Garrett Meurs	Canada	C	—	—	—	—	—	—	—	—	—	—
2011	6	153	Gabriel Beaupre	Canada	D	—	—	—	—	—	—	—	—	—	—
2011	7	183	Dillon Donnelly	Canada	D	—	—	—	—	—	—	—	—	—	—
2012	2	41	Mitchell Heard	Canada	C	—	—	—	—	—	—	—	—	—	—
2012	3	72	Troy Bourke	Canada	LW	—	—	—	—	—	—	—	—	—	—
2012	5	132	Michael Clarke	Canada	C	—	—	—	—	—	—	—	—	—	—
2012	6	162	Joseph Blandisi	Canada	C	101	10	21	31	78	—	—	—	—	—
2012	7	192	Colin Smith	Canada	C	1	0	0	0	0	—	—	—	—	—
2013	1	1	Nathan MacKinnon	Canada	C	950	420	722	1142	428	—	—	—	—	—
2013	2	32	Chris Bigras	Canada	D	46	1	3	4	18	—	—	—	—	—
2013	3	63	Spencer Martin	Canada	G	72	0	0	0	0	25	33	—	8	3.60
2013	4	93	Mason Geertsen	Canada	D	30	0	0	0	89	—	—	—	—	—
2013	5	123	Will Butcher	United States	D	275	16	98	114	34	—	—	—	—	—
2013	6	153	Ben Storm	United States	D	—	—	—	—	—	—	—	—	—	—
2013	7	183	Wilhelm Westlund	Sweden	D	—	—	—	—	—	—	—	—	—	—
2014	1	23	Conner Bleackley	Canada	C	—	—	—	—	—	—	—	—	—	—
2014	3	84	Kyle Wood	Canada	D	—	—	—	—	—	—	—	—	—	—
2014	4	93	Nicholas Magyar	United States	RW	—	—	—	—	—	—	—	—	—	—
2014	4	114	Alexis Pepin	Canada	LW	—	—	—	—	—	—	—	—	—	—
2014	5	144	Anton Lindholm	Sweden	D	66	0	5	5	16	—	—	—	—	—
2014	6	174	Maximilián Pajpach	Slovakia	G	—	—	—	—	—	—	—	—	—	—
2014	7	204	Julien Nantel	Canada	LW	—	—	—	—	—	—	—	—	—	—
2015	1	10	Mikko Rantanen	Finland	RW	716	316	466	782	501	—	—	—	—	—
2015	2	39	A. J. Greer	Canada	LW	326	36	45	81	448	—	—	—	—	—
2015	2	40	Nicolas Meloche	Canada	D	57	2	6	8	39	—	—	—	—	—
2015	3	71	Jean-Christophe Beaudin	Canada	C	22	0	1	1	7	—	—	—	—	—
2015	4	101	Andrei Mironov	Russia	D	10	1	2	3	12	—	—	—	—	—
2015	6	161	Sergei Boikov	Russia	D	—	—	—	—	—	—	—	—	—	—
2015	7	191	Gustav Olhaver	Sweden	C	—	—	—	—	—	—	—	—	—	—
2016	1	10	Tyson Jost	Canada	C	564	69	96	165	227	—	—	—	—	—
2016	2	40	Cameron Morrison	Canada	LW	—	—	—	—	—	—	—	—	—	—
2016	3	71	Josh Anderson	Canada	D	—	—	—	—	—	—	—	—	—	—
2016	5	131	Adam Werner	Sweden	G	2	0	0	0	0	1	1	—	0	3.42
2016	6	161	Nathan Clurman	United States	D	1	0	0	0	2	—	—	—	—	—
2016	7	191	Travis Barron	Canada	LW	—	—	—	—	—	—	—	—	—	—
2017	1	4	Cale Makar	Canada	D	470	136	371	507	134	—	—	—	—	—
2017	2	32	Conor Timmins	Canada	D	198	6	48	54	82	—	—	—	—	—
2017	4	94	Nick Henry	Canada	RW	—	—	—	—	—	—	—	—	—	—
2017	4	114	Petr Kváča	Czech Republic	G	—	—	—	—	—	—	—	—	—	—
2017	5	125	Igor Shvyrev	Russia	C	—	—	—	—	—	—	—	—	—	—
2017	6	156	Denis Smirnov	Russia	LW	—	—	—	—	—	—	—	—	—	—
2017	7	187	Nicky Leivermann	United States	D	—	—	—	—	—	—	—	—	—	—
2018	1	16	Martin Kaut	Czech Republic	RW	56	6	5	11	10	—	—	—	—	—
2018	3	64	Justus Annunen	Finland	G	80	0	1	1	2	35	32	—	5	2.86
2018	3	78	Sampo Ranta	Finland	LW	16	0	0	0	6	—	—	—	—	—
2018	4	109	Tyler Weiss	United States	LW	—	—	—	—	—	—	—	—	—	—
2018	5	140	Brandon Saigeon	Canada	C	—	—	—	—	—	—	—	—	—	—
2018	5	146	Danila Zhuravlyov	Russia	D	—	—	—	—	—	—	—	—	—	—
2018	6	171	Nikolai Kovalenko	Russia	RW	57	7	13	20	16	—	—	—	—	—
2018	7	202	Shamil Shmakov	Russia	G	—	—	—	—	—	—	—	—	—	—
2019	1	4	Bowen Byram	Canada	D	328	44	108	152	220	—	—	—	—	—
2019	1	16	Alex Newhook	Canada	C	338	70	81	151	88	—	—	—	—	—
2019	2	47	Drew Helleson	United States	D	119	7	22	29	69	—	—	—	—	—
2019	3	63	Matthew Stienburg	Canada	C	8	0	0	0	22	—	—	—	—	—
2019	3	78	Alex Beaucage	Canada	RW	—	—	—	—	—	—	—	—	—	—
2019	5	140	Sasha Mutala	Canada	RW	—	—	—	—	—	—	—	—	—	—
2019	6	171	Luka Burzan	Canada	C	—	—	—	—	—	—	—	—	—	—
2019	7	202	Trent Miner	Canada	G	6	0	0	0	0	1	1	—	3	2.01
2020	1	25	Justin Barron	Canada	D	208	18	34	52	76	—	—	—	—	—
2020	3	74	Jean-Luc Foudy	Canada	C	13	1	0	1	6	—	—	—	—	—
2020	4	118	Colby Ambrosio	Canada	C	—	—	—	—	—	—	—	—	—	—
2020	5	138	Ryder Rolston	United States	RW	—	—	—	—	—	—	—	—	—	—
2020	6	166	Nils Aman	Sweden	C	132	8	21	29	28	—	—	—	—	—
2021	1	28	Oskar Olausson	Sweden	LW	4	0	0	0	0	—	—	—	—	—
2021	2	61	Sean Behrens	United States	D	—	—	—	—	—	—	—	—	—	—
2021	3	92	Andrei Buyalsky	Kazakhstan	C	—	—	—	—	—	—	—	—	—	—
2021	7	220	Taylor Makar	Canada	C	12	0	0	0	4	—	—	—	—	—
2022	6	193	Christopher Romaine	United States	D	—	—	—	—	—	—	—	—	—	—
2022	7	225	Ivan Zhigalov	Belarus	G	—	—	—	—	—	—	—	—	—	—
2023	1	27	Calum Ritchie	Canada	C	72	14	17	31	22	—	—	—	—	—
2023	1	31	Mikhail Gulyayev	Russia	D	—	—	—	—	—	—	—	—	—	—
2023	5	155	Nikita Ishimnikov	Russia	D	—	—	—	—	—	—	—	—	—	—
2023	6	187	Jeremy Hanzel	Canada	D	—	—	—	—	—	—	—	—	—	—
2023	7	219	Maroš Jedlička	Slovakia	LW	—	—	—	—	—	—	—	—	—	—
2024	2	38	Ilya Nabokov	Russia	G	—	—	—	—	—	—	—	—	—	—
2024	3	76	William Zellers	United States	LW	—	—	—	—	—	—	—	—	—	—
2024	4	121	Jake Fisher	United States	C	—	—	—	—	—	—	—	—	—	—
2024	5	132	Louka Cloutier	Canada	G	—	—	—	—	—	—	—	—	—	—
2024	5	137	Ivan Yunin	Russia	G	—	—	—	—	—	—	—	—	—	—
2024	5	161	Maxmilian Curran	Czechia	C	—	—	—	—	—	—	—	—	—	—
2024	6	185	Tory Pitner	United States	D	—	—	—	—	—	—	—	—	—	—
2024	7	215	Christian Humphreys	United States	C	—	—	—	—	—	—	—	—	—	—
2024	7	217	Nikita Prishchepov	Russia	C	10	0	0	0	0	—	—	—	—	—
2025	3	77	Francesco Dell'Elce	Canada	D	—	—	—	—	—	—	—	—	—	—
2025	4	118	Linus Funck	Sweden	D	—	—	—	—	—	—	—	—	—	—
2025	7	214	Nolan Roed	United States	C	—	—	—	—	—	—	—	—	—	—
2026	2	43	Egor Shilov	Russia	C	—	—	—	—	—	—	—	—	—	—
2026	3	74	Beckett Hamilton	Canada	C	—	—	—	—	—	—	—	—	—	—
2026	4	126	Tobiáš Tvrzník	Czechia	G	—	—	—	—	—	—	—	—	—	—
2026	4	128	Axel Elofsson	Sweden	D	—	—	—	—	—	—	—	—	—	—
2026	5	140	Cole Tuminaro	United States	D	—	—	—	—	—	—	—	—	—	—
2026	5	152	Teddy Lechner	United States	D	—	—	—	—	—	—	—	—	—	—
2026	7	195	Shawn Carrier	Canada	LW	—	—	—	—	—	—	—	—	—	—
2026	7	214	Ondřej Ruml	Czechia	D	—	—	—	—	—	—	—	—	—	—
2026	7	215	Alexandre Raymond	Canada	G	—	—	—	—	—	—	—	—	—	—

== See also ==
- List of Quebec Nordiques draft picks
