= Ryan Munce =

Canadian ice hockey player

- Born: April 16, 1985 (age 41) Mississauga, Ontario, Canada
- Height: 6 ft 2 in (188 cm)
- Weight: 190 lb (86 kg; 13 st 8 lb)
- Position: Goaltender
- Caught: Left
- Retired team Former teams: Retired; AHL; Norfolk Admirals; Syracuse Crunch; ECHL; Bakersfield Condors; Reading Royals; Johnstown Chiefs; Mississippi Sea Wolves; Charlotte Checkers; CHL; Bossier-Shreveport Mudbugs
- NHL draft: 82nd overall, 2003; Los Angeles Kings
- Playing career: 2000–2012

Ryan Munce (born April 16, 1985) is a Canadian former professional ice hockey goaltender. He now runs his own goalie school called Ryan Munce Goaltending School. Munce was selected by the Los Angeles Kings in the third round (82nd overall) of the 2003 NHL entry draft. He helped backstop Team Canada to its first Gold Medal in the 2003 U18 World Championship where he accomplished the lowest GAA in the tournament and Gold Medal player of the game.

On July 28, 2005, the Los Angeles Kings signed Munce to a three-year, entry-level contract. Was traded in 2007 to the Tampa Bay Lightning.

== International ==
Munce backstopped Team Canada to a gold medal at the 2003 IIHF World U18 Championships, where he posted the tournament's best goals against average of 1.83.

== Awards and honours ==
Award	Year
OHL Dinty Moore Trophy - Best Rookie Goals Against Average (2.64)	2002–03
Canadian Hockey League All-Rookie Team	2002–03
IIHF World U18 Championship Best Goals Against Average (1.83)	2003
