= Ivan Khomutov =

Russian ice hockey player (born 1985)

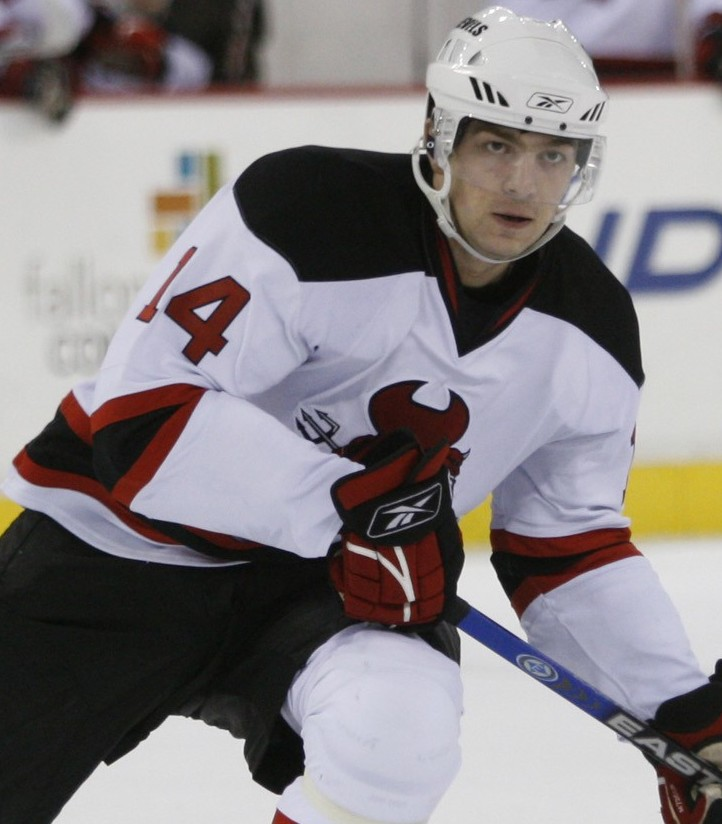
- Khomutov with the Lowell Devils during the 2007-08 season
- Born: March 11, 1985 (age 41) Saratov, Russian SSR, Soviet Union
- Height: 6 ft 3 in (191 cm)
- Weight: 205 lb (93 kg; 14 st 9 lb)
- Position: Centre
- Shot: Left
- Played for: Albany River Rats; Lowell Devils; HC CSKA Moscow; Avtomobilist Yekaterinburg
- NHL draft: 93rd overall, 2003; New Jersey Devils
- Playing career: 2002–2014

Ivan Khomutov (born March 11, 1985) is a Russian former professional ice hockey forward. He was selected by New Jersey Devils in the 8th round (242nd overall) of the 2002 NHL entry draft.

Prior to returning to Russia to join HC CSKA Moscow of the KHL for the 2008–09 KHL season, Khomutov had played 201 games in the American Hockey League with the Albany River Rats and Lowell Devils.

== Career statistics ==
			Regular season					Playoffs
Season	Team	League	GP	G	A	Pts	PIM	GP	G	A	Pts	PIM
2001–02	CSKA–2 Moscow	RUS.3	31	11	8	19	16	—	—	—	—	—
2002–03	CSKA–2 Moscow	RUS.3	19	13	6	19	28	—	—	—	—	—
2002–03	Elemash Elektrostal	RUS.2	20	1	1	2	8	—	—	—	—	—
2002–03	Elemash–2 Elektrostal	RUS.3	2	1	1	2	0	—	—	—	—	—
2003–04	London Knights	OHL	40	9	12	21	25	15	3	1	4	7
2004–05	Albany River Rats	AHL	66	6	11	17	30	—	—	—	—	—
2005–06	Albany River Rats	AHL	60	9	20	29	44	—	—	—	—	—
2006–07	Lowell Devils	AHL	3	1	1	2	2	—	—	—	—	—
2006–07	Trenton Titans	ECHL	5	0	1	1	2	—	—	—	—	—
2006–07	HC–2 MVD	RUS.4	1	0	0	0	0	—	—	—	—	—
2007–08	Lowell Devils	AHL	72	13	19	32	53	—	—	—	—	—
2008–09	CSKA Moscow	KHL	46	9	7	16	32	7	0	1	1	4
2008–09	CSKA–2 Moscow	RUS.3	—	—	—	—	—	2	0	0	0	6
2009–10	Avtomobilist Yekaterinburg	KHL	17	0	5	5	14	—	—	—	—	—
2009–10	Molot–Prikamye Perm	RUS.2	11	2	3	5	12	—	—	—	—	—
2009–10	Krylia Stolitsy Moskva	RUS.3	1	0	1	1	0	—	—	—	—	—
2010–11	Kristall Saratov	VHL	41	3	12	15	34	7	0	1	1	16
2010–11	Kristall–2 Saratov	RUS.3	6	4	1	5	0	—	—	—	—	—
2011–12	Lada Togliatti	VHL	8	0	2	2	4	—	—	—	—	—
2011–12	Kompanion Kiev	UKR	25	22	27	49	18	—	—	—	—	—
2012–13	Kompanion Kiev	UKR	13	1	7	8	6	—	—	—	—	—
2012–13	Berkut Kyiv	UKR	17	5	8	13	7	—	—	—	—	—
2013–14	Dunaújvárosi Acélbikák	MOL	4	1	2	3	6	—	—	—	—	—
AHL totals			201	29	51	80	129	—	—	—	—	—
KHL totals			63	9	12	21	46	7	1	0	1	4
