= Wojtek Wolski =

Polish-Canadian ice hockey player

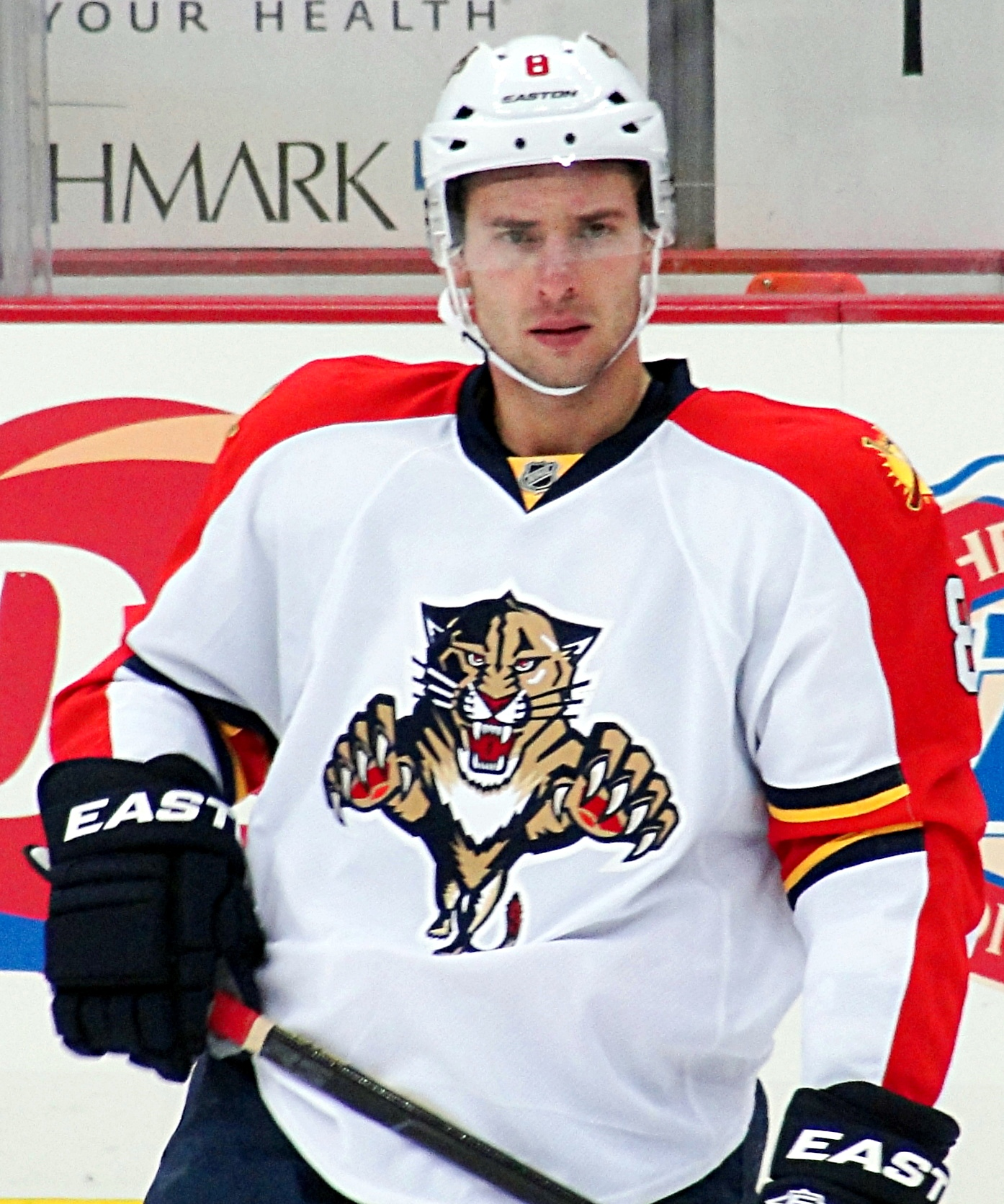
- Wolski with the Panthers in 2012
- Born: February 24, 1986 (age 40) Zabrze, Poland
- Height: 6 ft 3 in (191 cm)
- Weight: 215 lb (98 kg; 15 st 5 lb)
- Position: Left wing
- Shot: Left
- Played for: Colorado Avalanche; Phoenix Coyotes; New York Rangers; Florida Panthers; KH Sanok; Washington Capitals; Torpedo Nizhny Novgorod; Metallurg Magnitogorsk; Kunlun Red Star; HC Oceláři Třinec
- National team: Canada
- NHL draft: 21st overall, 2004; Colorado Avalanche
- Playing career: 2005–2020

Wojciech "Wojtek" Wolski (Polish pronunciation: [ˈvɔjtɛk ˈvɔlski]; born February 24, 1986) is a Polish-Canadian former professional ice hockey forward who played eight seasons in the National Hockey League (NHL) with the Colorado Avalanche, Phoenix Coyotes, New York Rangers, Florida Panthers and Washington Capitals. After leaving the NHL in 2013, Wolski continued his career in the Kontinental Hockey League (KHL), playing for Torpedo Nizhny Novgorod, Metallurg Magnitogorsk (with whom he won the Gagarin Cup in 2016) and Kunlun Red Star.

While he holds dual citizenship, Wolski is a product of the Canadian training system and was ineligible to represent Poland internationally. He was selected to represent Canada at the 2018 Winter Olympics.

== Playing career ==
As a youth, Wolski played in the 2000 Quebec International Pee-Wee Hockey Tournament with the Toronto Marlboros minor ice hockey team.

=== Junior ===
Wolski was drafted in the first round, 21st overall, in the 2004 NHL entry draft by the Colorado Avalanche. It was originally believed he would be the 10th-15th pick, but some teams passed on him because he was charged with assault causing bodily harm by Toronto police shortly before the draft; Wolski allegedly beat and left hospitalized another young man his age at a birthday party. The case was dismissed when it was learned Wolski was defending his girlfriend, who had been pushed off a porch.

Prior to being drafted, Wolski attended St. Michael's College School and played for the Buzzers hockey team in 2001–02. Before making the Avalanche roster, he recorded 14 franchise records as a member of the Ontario Hockey League's Brampton Battalion and earned the award for OHL's Most Valuable Player in 2006. Wolski was the OHL Player of the Month an unprecedented four months in a row (December, January, February and March). He was also an alternate captain for Ontario's Under-17 team at the 2003 Canada Winter Games. Wolski played for Canada in the 2004 Canada/Russia Series and was voted Player of the Game (Team Cherry) for 2004 CHL Top Prospects Game.

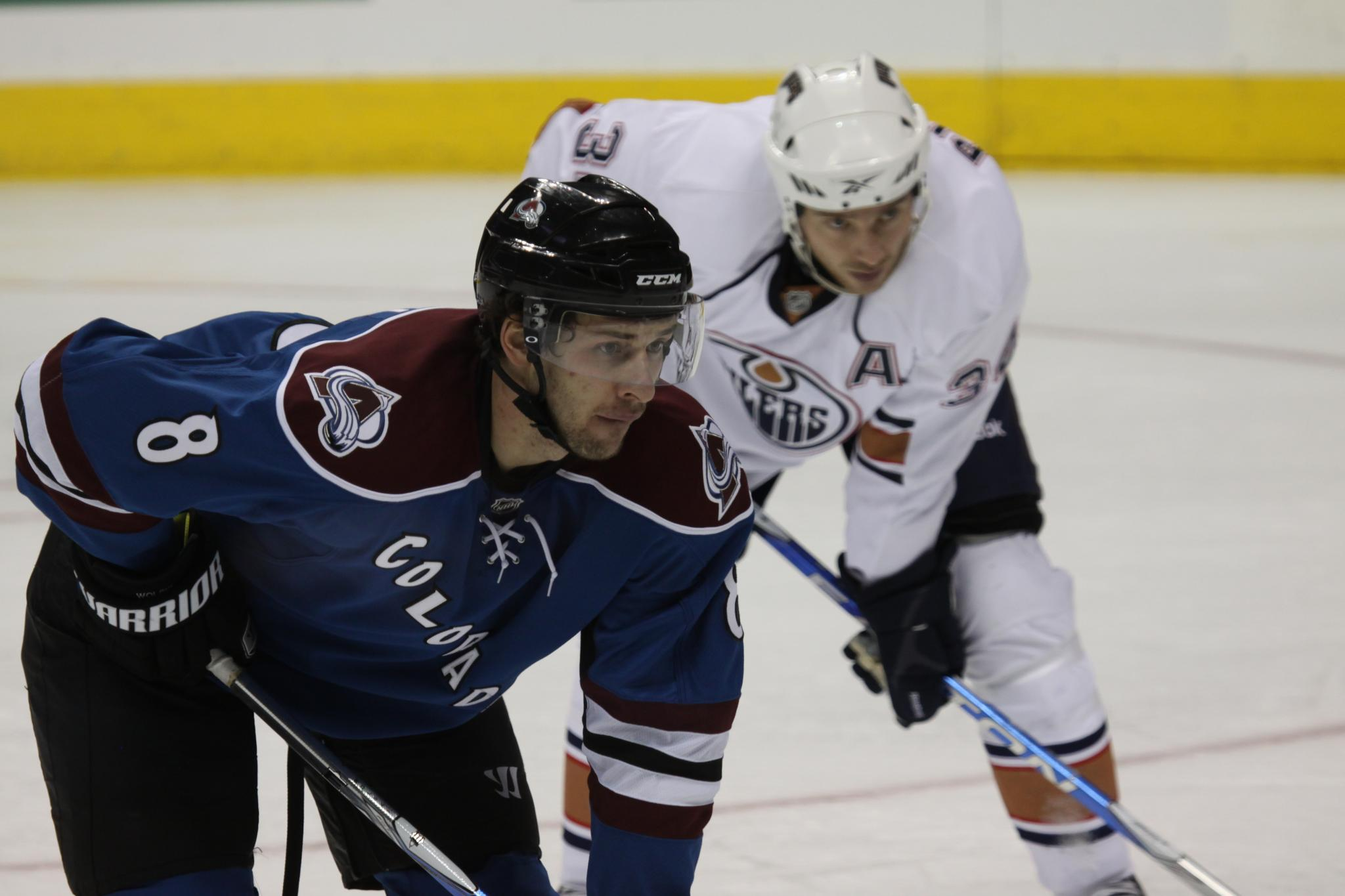
Wolski during his final season with the Avalanche

=== Professional ===
==== Colorado Avalanche ====
Wolski made his Avalanche debut in the 2006 Stanley Cup playoffs and marked a sensational debut with three points (one goal, two assists). In his first full professional season, he played in the NHL YoungStars Game on January 23, 2007, a part of the 2007 NHL All-Star Game festivities held in Dallas. He recorded two points (two assists) for the Western Conference.

In the 2008–09 season, Wolski demonstrated his scoring talent in shootouts. At season's end, he would score 10 times out of 12 attempts, establishing a single-season record in percentage of shootout goals scored. His 14 goals and 28 assists would be good enough to finish third on the Avs with 42 points, behind Milan Hejduk and Ryan Smyth.

==== Phoenix Coyotes ====
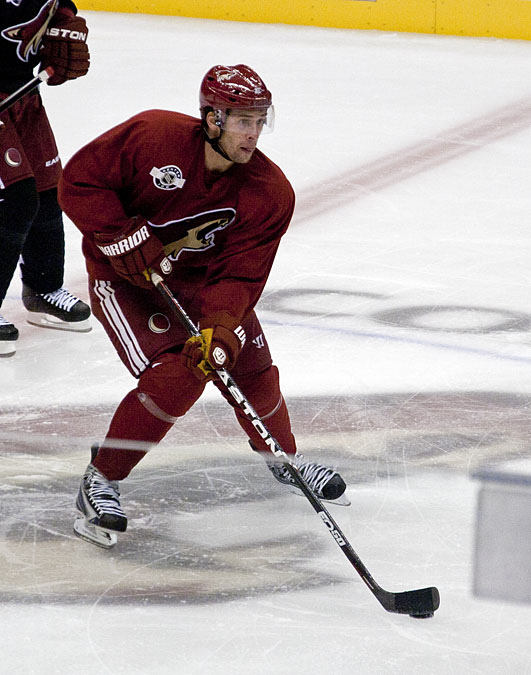
Wolski at Coyotes' practice in 2010

On March 3, 2010, Wolski was traded to the Phoenix Coyotes in exchange for Peter Mueller and Kevin Porter. In his first game with the Coyotes, he scored the game-winning goal against his former team, the Avalanche, with just 22 seconds left in the third period. Three days later, in his second game with the Coyotes, he scored again in a 4–0 win against the Anaheim Ducks. On June 28, 2010, Wolski signed a two-year contract extension with the Coyotes. After joining Phoenix, he switched from the number 8 he wore in Colorado (already in use by Scottie Upshall) to number 86, becoming the second NHL player to wear that number (Jonathan Ferland played seven games for the Montreal Canadiens in 2006 wearing number 86).

==== New York Rangers ====
In the 2010–11 season, Wolski failed to recapture his scoring pace from after last years trade from Colorado. With a steadily diminished role with the Coyotes, he was traded for the second time within a year to the New York Rangers in exchange for Michal Rozsíval on January 10, 2011. Wolski was slated to play the first line but a hernia injury caused an end to a potentially outbreak season, he was a healthy scratch on more than one occasion.

==== Florida Panthers ====
On February 25, 2012, Wolski was traded to the Florida Panthers in exchange for Michael Vernace and a third-round pick in the 2013 NHL entry draft.

==== Washington Capitals ====
Wolski joined his fifth team in just over two years when he signed a one-year, $600,000 contract as a free agent with the Washington Capitals for the 2012–13 season on July 11, 2012.

During the 2012–13 NHL lockout, Wolski joined Ciarko PBS Bank KH Sanok, the top team at the time in the Polska Liga Hokejowa, the top-tier hockey league in Poland. He rejoined the Capitals at the start of the NHL season but was not utilized much during the lockout-shortened season. Wolski produced 4 goals and 5 assists in 27 games with the Caps.

==== Post-NHL career ====
===== KHL =====
Wolski signed with Torpedo Nizhny Novgorod of the Kontinental Hockey League (KHL) on May 20, 2013. After two successful seasons within Novgorod, he moved to Metallurg Magnitogorsk in signing a lucrative two-year deal on May 1, 2015. Wolski won the Gagarin Cup in 2016, his first season with Metallurg. On October 13, 2016, Wolski broke his neck and suffered a concussion in a freak accident during the game between Metallurg and Barys Astana, which left him unable to play for the rest of the season.

In the 2018–19 season, Wolski contributed offensively on the top scoring line with 15 points through his first 18 games. However, with Metallurg exceeding their foreign player quota with the acquisition of Nick Shore, Wolski was released from his contract on October 19, 2018. As a free agent, Wolski made a return to his previous club, Kunlun Red Star, agreeing to a two-year contract to continue in the KHL on October 27, 2018.

In the 2019–20 season, Wolski was limited to just 19 games with the Red Star through injury. In returning to health, Wolski left Kunlun and the KHL, securing a release on December 5, 2019.

===== Czech Extraliga =====
He signed a short-term contract to appear with Swiss National League club HC Ambrì-Piotta at the 2020 Spengler Cup before agreeing to a contract for the remainder of the season with Czech club, HC Oceláři Třinec of the Czech Extraliga on December 31, 2019.

During an appearance on the Spittin' Chiclets podcast in December 2020, Wolski announced his retirement from professional hockey.

== International play ==
Medal record

Representing Canada

Ice hockey

Olympic Games
Bronze medal – third place	2018 Pyeongchang	

During the 2017–18 season, Wolski was selected to represent Canada at the 2018 Winter Olympics in Pyeongchang, South Korea. Used in an offensive role, Wolski contributed with 3 goals and 4 points in 6 games to help Canada claim the Bronze medal.

== Personal life ==
Wolski left Poland with his parents and older brother Kordian in 1989. Two years later, by way of West Germany, they finally landed in Toronto, Ontario. He learned how to skate at a local outdoor skating rink in Etobicoke using his brother's skates, which were a few sizes too big. In order to make them fit, he would wear three pairs of socks and stuff the front of the boot with newspapers.

The first NHL game he attended as a young boy saw the Colorado Avalanche face the Toronto Maple Leafs at Maple Leaf Gardens. He followed the Avalanche as his favourite team ever since then and grew to idolize future teammate Joe Sakic before coincidentally being drafted by Colorado himself.

In the 2006-07 season, Wolski dated Canadian actress Ashley Leggat while playing for the Avalanche.

Following his retirement, Wolski competed in the sixth season of the CBC television series Battle of the Blades, a contest that paired hockey players with competitive figure skaters to develop show routines. He was partnered with former World champion Meagan Duhamel. Wolski and Duhamel won the competition.

== Career statistics ==
=== Regular season and playoffs ===
			Regular season					Playoffs
Season	Team	League	GP	G	A	Pts	PIM	GP	G	A	Pts	PIM
2001–02	St. Michael's Buzzers	OPJHL	33	16	33	49	40	—	—	—	—	—
2002–03	Brampton Battalion	OHL	64	25	32	57	24	11	5	0	5	6
2003–04	Brampton Battalion	OHL	66	29	41	70	30	12	5	3	8	8
2004–05	Brampton Battalion	OHL	67	29	44	73	41	6	2	5	7	6
2005–06	Brampton Battalion	OHL	57	47	81	128	46	—	—	—	—	—
2005–06	Colorado Avalanche	NHL	9	2	4	6	4	8	1	3	4	2
2006–07	Colorado Avalanche	NHL	76	22	28	50	14	—	—	—	—	—
2007–08	Colorado Avalanche	NHL	77	18	30	48	14	7	2	3	5	2
2008–09	Colorado Avalanche	NHL	78	14	28	42	28	—	—	—	—	—
2009–10	Colorado Avalanche	NHL	62	17	30	47	21	—	—	—	—	—
2009–10	Phoenix Coyotes	NHL	18	6	12	18	6	7	4	1	5	0
2010–11	Phoenix Coyotes	NHL	36	6	10	16	10	—	—	—	—	—
2010–11	New York Rangers	NHL	37	6	13	19	8	5	1	2	3	0
2011–12	New York Rangers	NHL	9	0	3	3	2	—	—	—	—	—
2011–12	Connecticut Whale	AHL	6	3	2	5	0	—	—	—	—	—
2011–12	Florida Panthers	NHL	22	4	5	9	0	2	0	0	0	4
2012–13	KH Sanok	POL	9	3	7	10	37	—	—	—	—	—
2012–13	Washington Capitals	NHL	27	4	5	9	6	—	—	—	—	—
2013–14	Torpedo Nizhny Novgorod	KHL	54	19	19	38	60	7	1	2	3	2
2014–15	Torpedo Nizhny Novgorod	KHL	52	23	20	43	36	5	2	2	4	8
2015–16	Metallurg Magnitogorsk	KHL	54	18	29	47	22	23	2	8	10	25
2016–17	Metallurg Magnitogorsk	KHL	19	5	5	10	6	—	—	—	—	—
2017–18	Kunlun Red Star	KHL	32	7	21	28	42	—	—	—	—	—
2017–18	Metallurg Magnitogorsk	KHL	14	5	7	12	10	11	5	6	11	4
2018–19	Metallurg Magnitogorsk	KHL	18	6	9	15	0	—	—	—	—	—
2018–19	Kunlun Red Star	KHL	26	5	8	13	10	—	—	—	—	—
2019–20	Kunlun Red Star	KHL	19	2	2	4	8	—	—	—	—	—
2019–20	HC Oceláři Třinec	ELH	13	10	7	17	8	—	—	—	—	—
NHL totals			451	99	168	267	113	29	8	9	17	8
KHL totals			288	90	120	210	194	46	10	18	28	39

=== International ===
Year	Team	Event	Result	GP	G	A	Pts	PIM
2003	Canada	U18	4th	5	1	4	5	4
2018	Canada	OG	3rd place, bronze medalist(s)	6	3	1	4	0
Senior totals				6	3	1	4	0

== Awards and honours ==
Award	Year
OHL
All-Rookie Team	2002–03
First All-Star Team	2003–04
Top Draft Prospect Award	2003–04
Second All-Star Team	2005–06
Red Tilson Trophy	2005–06
William Hanley Trophy	2005–06
CHL Canada Post Cup	2005–06
NHL
NHL YoungStars Game	2006–07
KHL
All-Star Game	2015
Gagarin Cup	2016

Awards and achievements
Preceded by Jonas Johansson	Colorado Avalanche first-round draft pick 2004	Succeeded by Chris Stewart
