= Denis Ezhov =

Russian ice hockey player (born 1985)

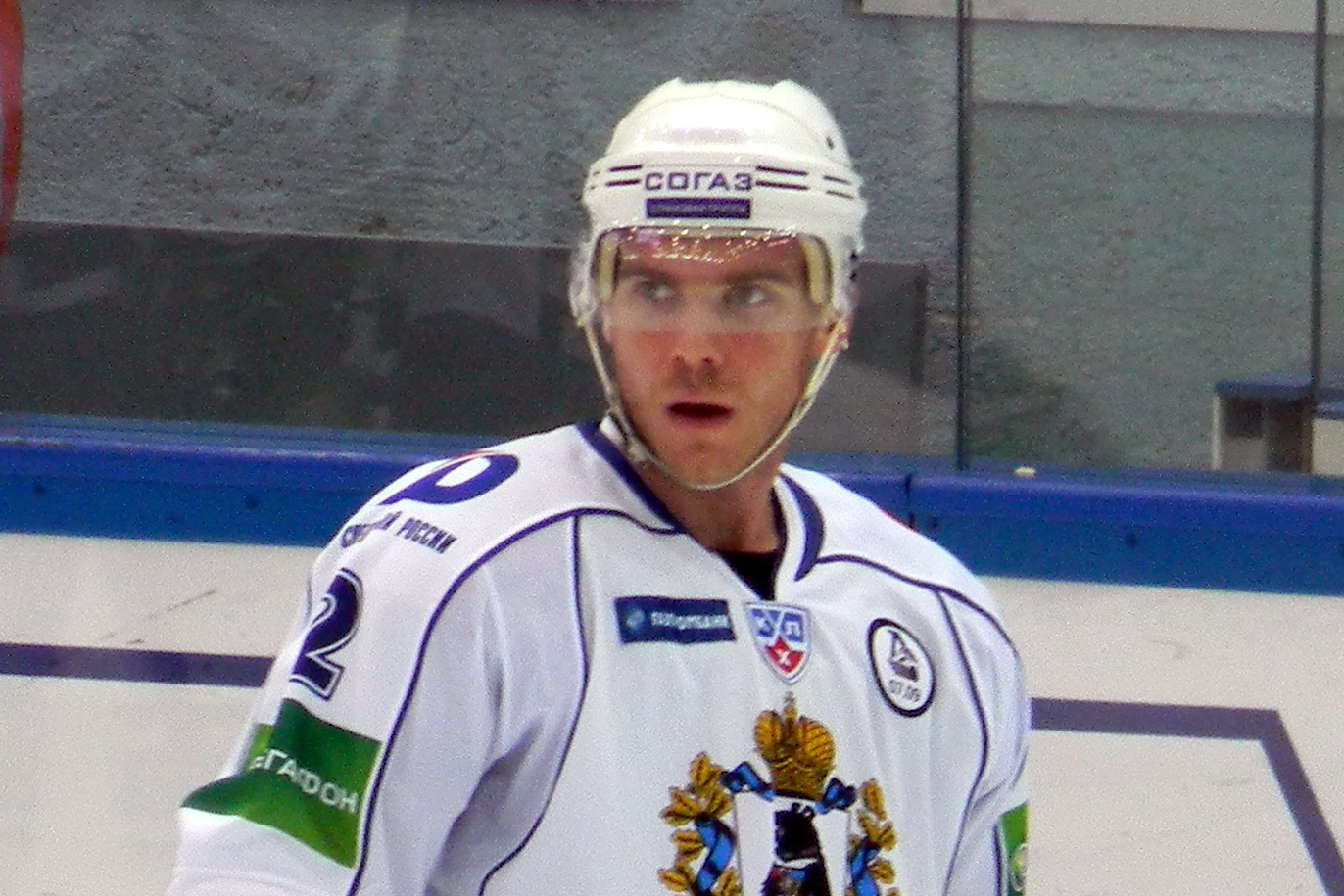
- Born: February 28, 1985 (age 41) Togliatti, Russian SFSR, URS
- Height: 5 ft 11 in (180 cm)
- Weight: 187 lb (85 kg; 13 st 5 lb)
- Position: Defence
- Shot: Left
- Erste team Former teams: Gyergyói HK; Lada Togliatti; Metallurg Novokuznetsk; Khimik Mytishchi; Traktor Chelyabinsk; Avangard Omsk; Amur Khabarovsk; HC Vityaz; Severstal Cherepovets
- NHL draft: 114th overall, 2003; Buffalo Sabres
- Playing career: 1999–2019

Denis Ezhov or Denis Yezhov (born February 28, 1985) is a Russian professional ice hockey player who currently plays for Gyergyói HK of the Erste Liga. Ezhov was selected by the Buffalo Sabres in the 4th round (114th overall) of the 2003 NHL entry draft.

Yezhov competed in the 2003 World Junior Ice Hockey Championships where he won a gold medal as a member of Team Russia.

== Career statistics ==
=== Regular season and playoffs ===
			Regular season					Playoffs
Season	Team	League	GP	G	A	Pts	PIM	GP	G	A	Pts	PIM
1999–2000	Lada–2 Togliatti	RUS.3	4	0	0	0	4	—	—	—	—	—
2000–01	Lada–2 Togliatti	RUS.3	22	1	4	5	16	—	—	—	—	—
2001–02	Lada Togliatti	RSL	15	0	0	0	6	—	—	—	—	—
2001–02	Lada–2 Togliatti	RUS.3	22	1	3	4	28	—	—	—	—	—
2002–03	CSK VVS Samara	RUS.2	10	1	1	2	10	—	—	—	—	—
2002–03	Lada–2 Togliatti	RUS.3	15	2	7	9	4	—	—	—	—	—
2003–04	Metallurg Novokuznetsk	RSL	19	0	1	1	2	3	0	0	0	0
2003–04	CSKA–2 Moscow	RUS.3	4	1	2	3	2	—	—	—	—	—
2004–05	Metallurg Novokuznetsk	RSL	28	0	0	0	16	4	0	0	0	2
2004–05	CSKA–2 Moscow	RUS.3	16	3	3	6	12	—	—	—	—	—
2005–06	Khimik Mytishchi	RSL	24	1	0	1	10	—	—	—	—	—
2005–06	Kristall Elektrostal	RUS.3	23	0	7	7	38	—	—	—	—	—
2006–07	Traktor Chelyabinsk	RSL	54	2	6	8	73	—	—	—	—	—
2007–08	Traktor Chelyabinsk	RSL	57	4	9	13	64	3	0	0	0	10
2008–09	Avangard Omsk	KHL	55	2	8	10	58	8	1	0	1	2
2009–10	Avangard Omsk	KHL	31	0	4	4	58	—	—	—	—	—
2010–11	Traktor Chelyabinsk	KHL	44	2	2	4	40	—	—	—	—	—
2011–12	Amur Khabarovsk	KHL	42	1	3	4	40	—	—	—	—	—
2012–13	Amur Khabarovsk	KHL	3	0	0	0	0	—	—	—	—	—
2012–13	Metallurg Novokuznetsk	KHL	28	1	2	3	20	—	—	—	—	—
2013–14	Amur Khabarovsk	KHL	46	1	6	7	51	—	—	—	—	—
2014–15	Amur Khabarovsk	KHL	60	2	10	12	68	—	—	—	—	—
2015–16	HC Vityaz	KHL	52	0	3	3	46	—	—	—	—	—
2016–17	Severstal Cherepovets	KHL	59	3	8	11	56	—	—	—	—	—
2017–18	Lada Togliatti	KHL	46	0	3	3	15	—	—	—	—	—
2018–19	CS Progym Gheorgheni	EL	42	5	12	17	65	7	0	2	2	10
2018–19	CS Progym Gheorgheni	ROU	27	1	9	10	40	6	1	1	2	2
RSL totals			197	7	16	23	171	10	0	0	0	12
KHL totals			466	12	49	61	452	8	1	0	1	2

=== International ===
Year	Team	Event	GP	G	A	Pts	PIM
2002	Russia	WJC18	8	0	3	3	4
2003	Russia	WJC	6	0	0	0	6
2003	Russia	WJC18	6	0	4	4	2
2004	Russia	WJC	6	0	0	0	2
2005	Russia	WJC	6	0	2	2	2
Junior totals			32	0	9	9	16
