= Mikhail Kuleshov =

Soviet ice hockey player (born 1981)

- Born: January 7, 1981 (age 45) Perm, Soviet Union
- Height: 6 ft 2 in (188 cm)
- Weight: 203 lb (92 kg; 14 st 7 lb)
- Position: Left wing
- Shot: Right
- Played for: Avangard Omsk; Severstal Cherepovets; SKA Saint Petersburg; Colorado Avalanche; Molot-Prikamye Perm; Junost Minsk
- NHL draft: 25th overall, 1999; Colorado Avalanche
- Playing career: 1998–2006

Mikhail Vasilievich Kuleshov (Russian: Михаил Васильевич Кулешов; born January 7, 1981, in Perm, Soviet Union) is a former professional ice hockey player. He played in the National Hockey League with the Colorado Avalanche.

== Playing career ==
Kuleshov was drafted in the 1st round, 25th overall, in the 1999 NHL entry draft by the Colorado Avalanche. A member of the Russian U/18 team in 1999, Kuleshov played parts of four seasons in the Russian Super League before coming to North America at the end of the 2000–01 season.

Kuleshov made his North American debut with the Avalanche's affiliate, the Hershey Bears of the American Hockey League, joining the team for their play-off run. He then spent the next three season's in the AHL before he made his NHL debut during the 2003–04 season. Mikhail only played 3 games for the Avalanche before he was sent back to the Bears.

A free agent upon the 2004 NHL Lockout, Kuleshov returned to Russia playing the season with SKA Saint Petersburg and Molot-Prikamye Perm of the RSL. Kuleshov last played with Yunost Minsk of the Belarusian Open League.

== Career statistics ==
=== Regular season and playoffs ===
			Regular season					Playoffs
Season	Team	League	GP	G	A	Pts	PIM	GP	G	A	Pts	PIM
1996–97	Avangard–2 Omsk	RUS.3	12	1	1	2	8	—	—	—	—	—
1997–98	Avangard Omsk	RSL	4	1	0	1	4	1	0	0	0	0
1997–98	Avangard–2 Omsk	RUS.3	12	12	3	15	12	—	—	—	—	—
1998–99	Severstal Cherepovets	RSL	16	2	0	2	8	3	0	0	0	4
1998–99	Severstal–2 Cherepovets	RUS.2	25	7	5	12	12	—	—	—	—	—
1998–99	Severstal–3 Cherepovets	RUS.3	3	2	1	3	32	—	—	—	—	—
1999–2000	Severstal Cherepovets	RSL	8	0	0	0	4	3	0	0	0	2
1999–2000	Severstal–2 Cherepovets	RUS.2	27	15	7	22	57	—	—	—	—	—
2000–01	SKA Saint Petersburg	RSL	7	0	0	0	8	—	—	—	—	—
2000–01	Hershey Bears	AHL	3	0	0	0	4	11	1	0	1	0
2001–02	Hershey Bears	AHL	60	8	11	19	43	7	0	1	1	4
2002–03	Hershey Bears	AHL	77	7	13	20	76	5	0	0	0	6
2003–04	Hershey Bears	AHL	55	4	6	10	38	—	—	—	—	—
2003–04	Colorado Avalanche	NHL	3	0	0	0	0	—	—	—	—	—
2004–05	SKA Saint Petersburg	RSL	11	0	0	0	6	—	—	—	—	—
2004–05	Molot–Prikamye Perm	RSL	23	0	3	3	16	—	—	—	—	—
2005–06	Yunost Minsk	BLR	22	5	6	11	22	—	—	—	—	—
2005–06	Yunost–2 Minsk	BLR.2	4	0	0	0	0	—	—	—	—	—
RSL totals			69	3	3	6	46	6	0	0	0	6
AHL totals			195	19	30	49	161	23	1	1	2	10
NHL totals			3	0	0	0	0	—	—	—	—	—

=== International ===
Year	Team	Event	Result	GP	G	A	Pts	PIM
1999	Russia	WJC18	6th	7	0	4	4	2
Junior totals				7	0	4	4	2

Awards and achievements
Preceded by Scott Parker	Colorado Avalanche first-round draft pick 1999	Succeeded by Václav Nedorost
