= Dmitri Chernykh =

Russian professional ice hockey forward

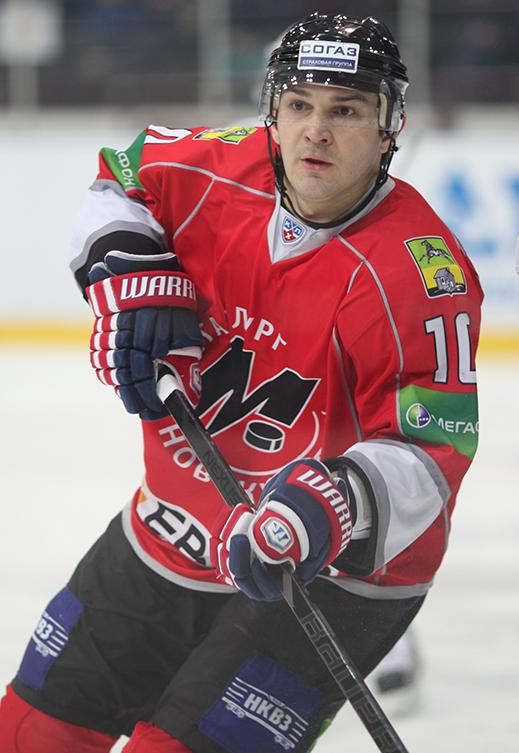
- Born: February 27, 1985 (age 41) Voskresensk, Russian SFSR
- Height: 6 ft 0 in (183 cm)
- Weight: 192 lb (87 kg; 13 st 10 lb)
- Position: Right wing
- Shot: Left
- Played for: CSKA Moscow; Dayton Bombers; Neftekhimik Nizhnekamsk; Lada Togliatti; Metallurg Novokuznetsk; Spartak Moscow; Salavat Yulaev Ufa
- NHL draft: 48th overall, 2003; New York Islanders
- Playing career: 2001–2020

Dmitri Aleksandrovich Chernykh (Russian: Дмитрий Александрович Черных; born February 27, 1985) is a Russian former professional ice hockey forward who played in the Kontinental Hockey League (KHL). He was drafted 48th overall in the 2003 NHL entry draft by the New York Islanders and is the son of former Soviet hockey player Alexander Chernykh.

Chernykh developed in the Khimik Voskresensk hockey system, the club his father also played for. He was a member of Russia's U18 national team, but struggled to make the U20 squad in the following years. Chernykh has primarily spent time skating in Russia's second- and third-tier leagues, struggling to break back into the KHL.

He played one season of hockey in North America for the Dayton Bombers during the 2006–07 season before returning to Russia.

== Career statistics ==
=== Regular season and playoffs ===
			Regular season					Playoffs
Season	Team	League	GP	G	A	Pts	PIM	GP	G	A	Pts	PIM
2000–01	Khimik–2 Voskresensk	RUS.3	11	4	3	7	4	—	—	—	—	—
2001–02	Khimik Voskresensk	RUS.2	7	0	0	0	2	—	—	—	—	—
2001–02	Khimik–2 Voskresensk	RUS.3	29	9	6	15	32	—	—	—	—	—
2002–03	Khimik Voskresensk	RUS.2	29	5	4	9	29	—	—	—	—	—
2002–03	Khimik–2 Voskresensk	RUS.3	9	2	4	6	22	—	—	—	—	—
2003–04	CSKA Moscow	RSL	27	2	2	4	0	—	—	—	—	—
2003–04	CSKA–2 Moscow	RUS.3	5	1	2	3	2	—	—	—	—	—
2004–05	CSKA–2 Moscow	RUS.3	24	5	7	12	26	—	—	—	—	—
2004–05	Mechel Chelyabinsk	RUS.2	22	1	5	6	6	4	1	0	1	0
2004–05	Mechel–2 Chelyabinsk	RUS.3	1	1	0	1	0	—	—	—	—	—
2005–06	Yuzhny Ural Orsk	RUS.2	15	1	1	2	4	—	—	—	—	—
2005–06	Yuzhny–2 Ural Orsk	RUS.2	1	0	0	0	4	—	—	—	—	—
2005–06	Khimik–SKA Novopolotsk	BLR	31	5	7	12	37	—	—	—	—	—
2006–07	Dayton Bombers	ECHL	37	5	4	9	7	—	—	—	—	—
2007–08	Neftekhimik Nizhnekamsk	RSL	4	0	0	0	2	—	—	—	—	—
2007–08	Neftekhimik–2 Nizhnekamsk	RUS.3	17	16	3	19	10	—	—	—	—	—
2007–08	Gazovik Tyumen	RUS.2	2	0	0	0	0	—	—	—	—	—
2007–08	HC Ryazan	RUS.2	22	7	8	15	18	—	—	—	—	—
2008–09	HC Ryazan	RUS.2	62	21	24	45	55	8	4	7	11	6
2009–10	Lada Togliatti	KHL	46	1	7	8	14	—	—	—	—	—
2010–11	Lada Togliatti	VHL	13	0	3	3	0	—	—	—	—	—
2010–11	Krylya Sovetov Moscow	VHL	30	4	9	13	41	5	0	1	1	2
2011–12	HC Ryazan	VHL	24	4	6	10	8	—	—	—	—	—
2011–12	Neftyanik Almetyevsk	VHL	22	6	3	9	18	8	0	1	1	2
2012–13	Metallurg Novokuznetsk	KHL	51	9	11	20	39	—	—	—	—	—
2013–14	Spartak Moscow	KHL	19	0	1	1	4	—	—	—	—	—
2014–15	Toros Neftekamsk	VHL	17	2	3	5	8	21	4	7	11	4
2015–16	Toros Neftekamsk	VHL	38	11	10	21	22	13	1	1	2	0
2016–17	Toros Neftekamsk	VHL	16	2	6	8	54	2	0	1	1	0
2016–17	Salavat Yulaev Ufa	KHL	16	1	0	1	4	—	—	—	—	—
2017–18	Khimik Voskresensk	VHL	15	6	2	8	4	—	—	—	—	—
2017–18	Spartak Moscow	KHL	29	4	1	5	4	4	0	0	0	0
2018–19	Khimik Voskresensk	VHL	4	0	2	2	2	—	—	—	—	—
2018–19	Spartak Moscow	KHL	8	0	0	0	0	5	0	1	1	2
2019–20	Khimik Voskresensk	VHL	49	4	9	13	14	3	0	0	0	0
RUS.2 & VHL totals			387	74	94	168	285	64	10	18	28	14
RSL totals			31	2	2	4	2	—	—	—	—	—
KHL totals			169	15	20	35	65	9	0	1	1	2

=== International ===
Year	Team	Event	Result	GP	G	A	Pts	PIM
2003	Russia	WJC18	3rd place, bronze medalist(s)	6	4	1	5	4
Junior totals				6	4	1	5	4
