= Grigory Shafigulin =

Russian ice hockey player (born 1985)

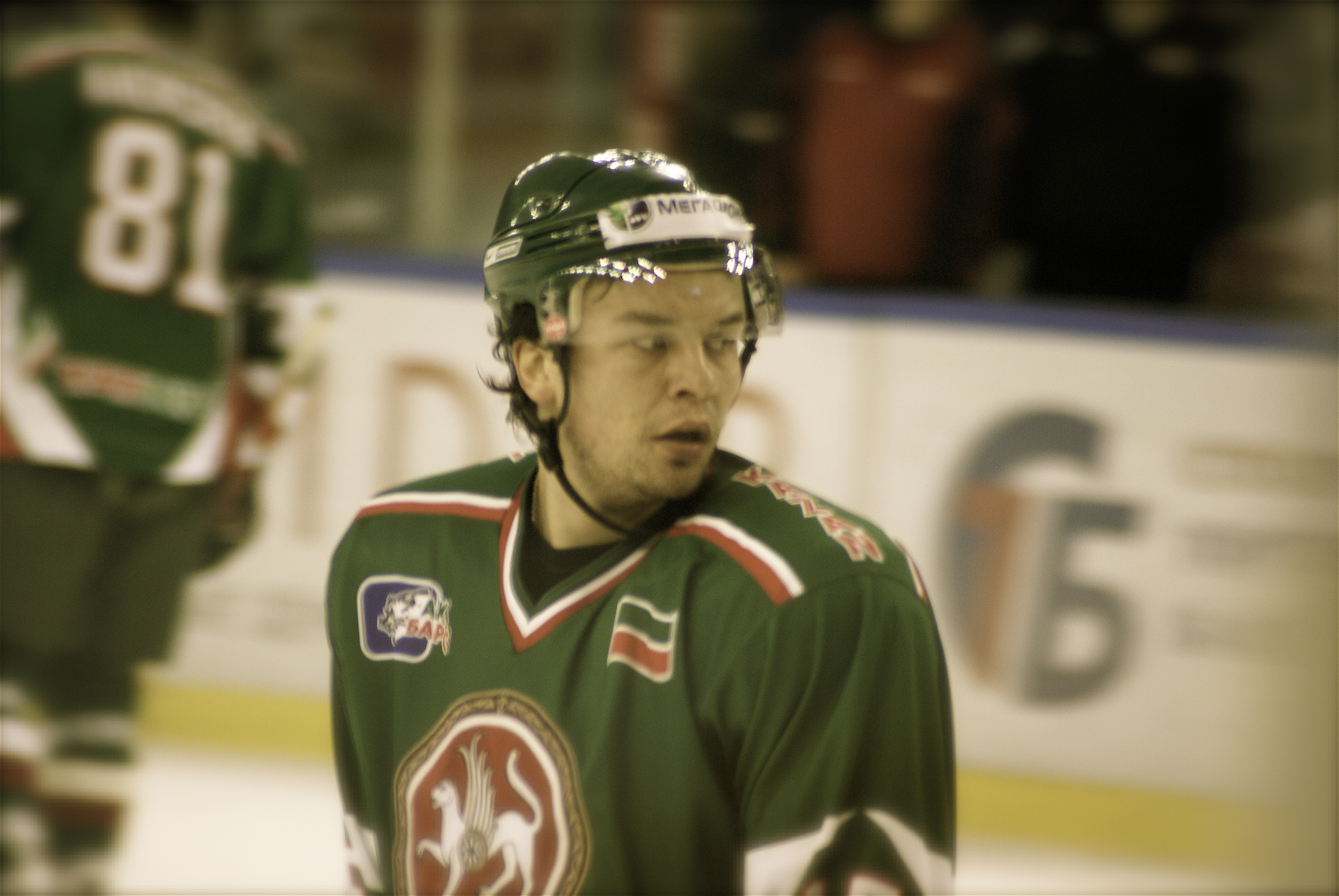
- Born: January 13, 1985 (age 41) Chelyabinsk, Soviet Union
- Height: 6 ft 4 in (193 cm)
- Weight: 227 lb (103 kg; 16 st 3 lb)
- Position: Centre
- Shot: Left
- Played for: Lokomotiv Yaroslavl; Ak Bars Kazan; HC Vityaz; Torpedo Nizhny Novgorod; Dynamo Moscow; Metallurg Magnitogorsk; Amur Khabarovsk; Spartak Moscow
- NHL draft: 98th overall, 2003; Nashville Predators
- Playing career: 2002–2016

Grigory Shafigulin (born January 13, 1985) is a Russian former professional ice hockey player. He played in the Russian Superleague and the Kontinental Hockey League (KHL) for Lokomotiv Yaroslavl, Ak Bars Kazan, HC Vityaz, Torpedo Nizhny Novgorod, Dynamo Moscow, Metallurg Magnitogorsk, Amur Khabarovsk and Spartak Moscow. He was selected by Nashville Predators in the 3rd round (98th overall) of the 2003 NHL entry draft.

== Career statistics ==
=== Regular season and playoffs ===
			Regular season					Playoffs
Season	Team	League	GP	G	A	Pts	PIM	GP	G	A	Pts	PIM
2001–02	Lokomotiv–2 Yaroslavl	RUS.3	19	2	2	4	12	—	—	—	—	—
2002–03	Lokomotiv Yaroslavl	RSL	11	0	1	1	4	8	0	0	0	4
2002–03	Lokomotiv–2 Yaroslavl	RUS.3	34	7	12	19	54	—	—	—	—	—
2003–04	Lokomotiv Yaroslavl	RSL	28	3	0	3	4	3	0	0	0	0
2003–04	Lokomotiv–2 Yaroslavl	RUS.3	13	2	7	9	24	—	—	—	—	—
2004–05	Lokomotiv Yaroslavl	RSL	46	5	6	11	49	9	0	0	0	10
2004–05	Lokomotiv–2 Yaroslavl	RUS.3	1	0	2	2	0	—	—	—	—	—
2005–06	Lokomotiv Yaroslavl	RSL	32	3	6	9	20	3	0	0	0	6
2005–06	Lokomotiv–2 Yaroslavl	RUS.3	6	1	3	4	18	—	—	—	—	—
2006–07	Lokomotiv Yaroslavl	RSL	54	5	16	21	46	7	3	0	3	14
2007–08	Ak Bars Kazan	RSL	39	5	5	10	112	8	1	0	1	4
2007–08	Ak Bars–2 Kazan	RUS.3	3	2	3	5	2	—	—	—	—	—
2008–09	Ak Bars Kazan	KHL	28	4	5	9	29	—	—	—	—	—
2008–09	Vityaz Chekhov	KHL	14	3	5	8	6	—	—	—	—	—
2009–10	Torpedo Nizhny Novgorod	KHL	40	5	12	17	62	—	—	—	—	—
2010–11	Dynamo Moscow	KHL	20	1	5	6	16	—	—	—	—	—
2011–12	Dynamo Moscow	KHL	37	8	8	16	14	9	0	0	0	6
2012–13	Dynamo Moscow	KHL	27	3	1	4	6	2	0	0	0	0
2013–14	Dynamo Moscow	KHL	8	1	0	1	8	—	—	—	—	—
2013–14	Dynamo Balashikha	VHL	2	0	1	1	0	—	—	—	—	—
2014–15	Metallurg Magnitogorsk	KHL	9	0	0	0	14	—	—	—	—	—
2014–15	Amur Khabarovsk	KHL	26	1	7	8	19	—	—	—	—	—
2015–16	Spartak Moscow	KHL	33	0	4	4	82	—	—	—	—	—
RSL totals			210	21	34	55	235	38	4	0	4	38
KHL totals			242	26	47	73	256	11	0	0	0	6

=== International ===
Year	Team	Event	GP	G	A	Pts	PIM
2003	Russia	WJC18	4	0	0	0	0
2004	Russia	WJC	6	0	0	0	0
2005	Russia	WJC	6	0	2	2	8
Junior totals			16	0	2	2	8
