= Denis Rehák =

Slovak ice hockey player

- Born: May 14, 1985 (age 41) Trenčín, Czechoslovakia
- Height: 6 ft 3 in (191 cm)
- Weight: 198 lb (90 kg; 14 st 2 lb)
- Position: Defence
- Shot: Right
- KAZ team: Yertis Pavlodar
- NHL draft: 212th overall, 2003; New York Islanders
- Playing career: 2007–2019

Denis Rehák (born May 14, 1985) is a Slovak professional ice hockey player who currently plays for Yertis Pavlodar of the Kazakhstan Hockey Championship. He was selected by the New York Islanders in the 7th round (212th overall) of the 2003 NHL entry draft.

Rehák played with HC Vítkovice in the Czech Extraliga during the 2010–11 Czech Extraliga season.

== Career statistics ==
			Regular season					Playoffs
Season	Team	League	GP	G	A	Pts	PIM	GP	G	A	Pts	PIM
2003–04	Prince George Cougars	WHL	25	0	3	3	12	—	—	—	—	—
2003–04	Dukla Trenčín	SVK U20	14	1	5	6	38	—	—	—	—	—
2003–04	Dukla Trenčín II	SVK.2	3	1	0	1	4	—	—	—	—	—
2004–05	HC Ytong Brno	CZE U20	46	4	15	19	38	—	—	—	—	—
2004–05	VSK Technika Brno	CZE.3	1	0	0	0	0	—	—	—	—	—
2005–06	SK Horácká Slavia Třebíč	CZE.2	45	1	8	9	40	—	—	—	—	—
2006–07	SK Horácká Slavia Třebíč	CZE.2	46	6	7	13	70	5	0	0	0	4
2007–08	HK 32 Liptovský Mikuláš	Slovak	54	0	8	8	40	—	—	—	—	—
2008–09	MHk 32 Liptovský Mikuláš	Slovak	52	3	15	18	20	6	0	0	0	2
2009–10	HC Vítkovice Steel	Czech	35	0	2	2	37	14	2	1	3	8
2010–11	HC Vítkovice Steel	Czech	48	3	2	5	22	13	0	0	0	0
2011–12	HC Vítkovice Steel	Czech	28	6	3	9	14	—	—	—	—	—
2012–13	HC Vítkovice Steel	Czech	42	1	4	5	12	8	1	0	1	6
2013–14	Ertis Pavlodar	KAZ	48	10	12	22	48	13	4	3	7	4
2014–15	Ertis Pavlodar	KAZ	30	3	14	17	22	10	0	1	1	2
2015–16	Ertis Pavlodar	KAZ	13	1	0	1	4	—	—	—	—	—
2015–16	HK Dukla Trenčín	Slovak	36	1	6	7	18	5	0	0	0	2
2016–17	MsHK Žilina	Slovak	41	1	6	7	22	—	—	—	—	—
2016–17	HKm Zvolen	Slovak	5	0	0	0	6	—	—	—	—	—
2016–17	HC Nové Zámky	Slovak	11	2	4	6	0	5	0	0	0	2
2017–18	MHK Dubnica nad Váhom	SVK.2	44	7	22	29	20	3	1	0	1	0
2018–19	MHK Dubnica nad Váhom	SVK.2	43	1	22	23	16	11	2	0	2	16
Slovak totals			199	7	39	46	106	16	0	0	0	6
Czech totals			153	10	11	21	85	35	3	1	4	14
KAZ totals			91	14	26	40	74	23	4	4	8	6
