= Jonas Johansson (ice hockey, born 1984) =

Swedish ice hockey player (born 1984)

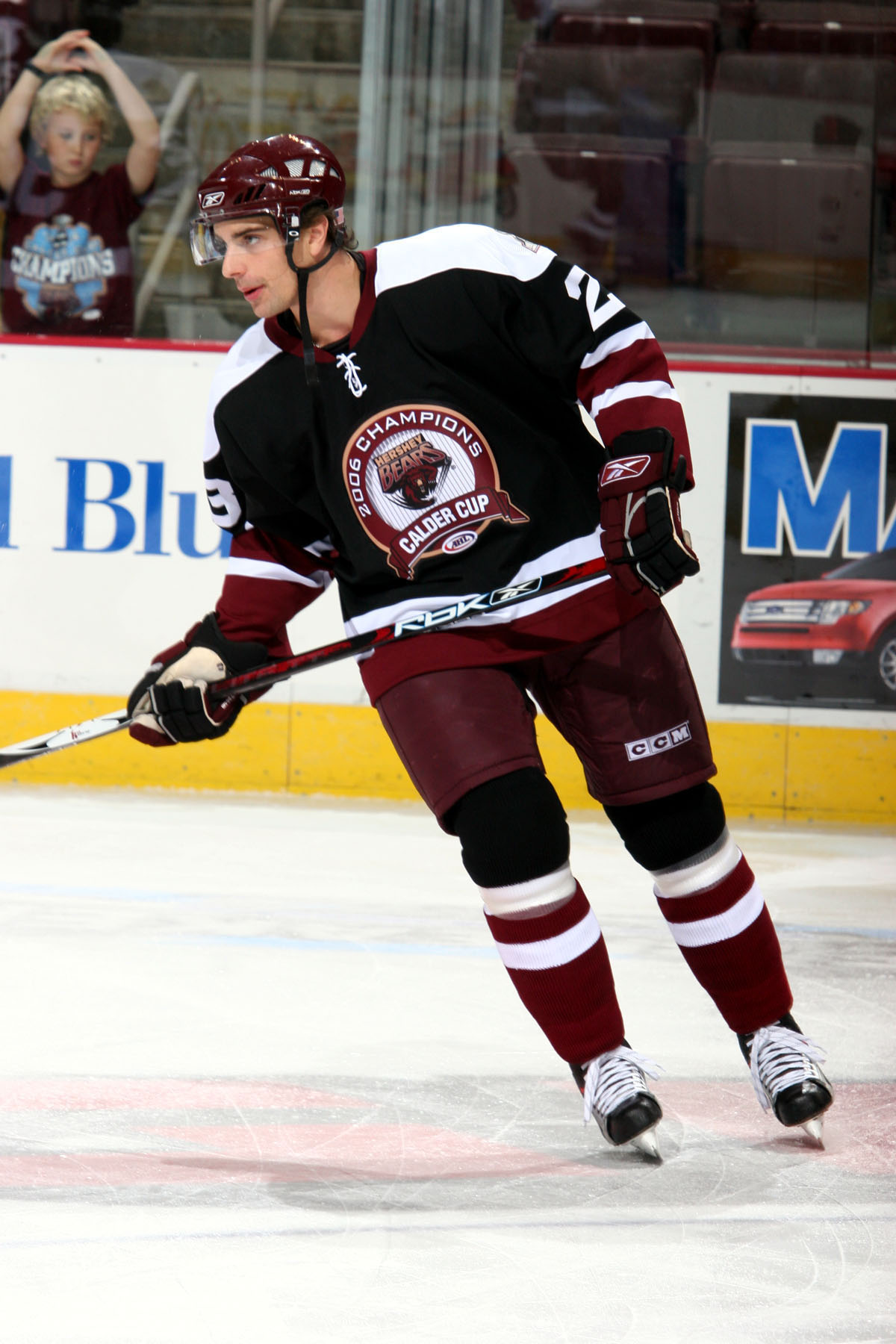
- Johansson with the Hershey Bears in 2006
- Born: March 18, 1984 (age 42) Jönköping, Sweden
- Height: 6 ft 3 in (191 cm)
- Weight: 215 lb (98 kg; 15 st 5 lb)
- Position: Right wing
- Shot: Right
- Played for: HV71; Washington Capitals; SG Cortina; HC Alleghe; Frisk Asker; Lausitzer Füchse; Stavanger Oilers; SønderjyskE; HC Gherdëina
- NHL draft: 28th overall, 2002; Colorado Avalanche
- Playing career: 2001–2020

Jonas Johansson (born March 18, 1984) is a Swedish former professional ice hockey player who briefly played in the National Hockey League (NHL).

== Playing career ==
Johansson was drafted in the 1st round, 28th overall, by the Colorado Avalanche in the 2002 NHL entry draft. He was traded on October 23, 2003, to the Washington Capitals with Bates Battaglia for Steve Konowalchuk and the Capitals' 3rd round choice in the 2004 NHL entry draft.

Johansson started his hockey career with the Swedish Jönköping-based club HV71's junior team in 1999 and played with them for three seasons before moving to North America. In total he played 26 games, totaling 15 goals and 19 assists for 34 points in the Swedish junior league. In the Swedish elite league Elitserien during the 2001-02 season, he appeared in five regular games and two playoff games for HV71.

During the 2005–06 season with the Hershey Bears, Johansson scored three points in one game on January 6, 2006, against the Bridgeport Sound Tigers. In the same season, he also appeared in his only NHL game, going scoreless with the Capitals. After two seasons playing with the Bears, Johansson was loaned to the Grand Rapids Griffins on February 27, 2007. In early May 2007, after playing ice hockey for five seasons in North America, he signed a two-year deal with his former Swedish club HV71 in the Swedish elite league Elitserien.

On May 19, 2009, Johansson signed a one-year contract with VIK Västerås HK of the HockeyAllsvenskan for the 2009–10 season.

On August 31, 2010, Johansson signed a one-contract with SG Cortina in Italy for the 2010–11 season. After two productive seasons with Cortina, Johansson continued to play in the Serie A, but signed a one-year contract with rivals, HC Alleghe on October 12, 2012.

On April 30, 2013, Johansson opted to leave Italian hockey, and signed a contract with Norwegian club Frisk Asker Ishockey of the GET-ligaen. During the 2013–14 season, Johansson scored at a point-per-game pace with 28 goals and 44 points, to be amongst the league's top scorers. He tenure with Frisk was limited to one season as on May 22, 2014, he signed a one-year deal with German second league club Lausitzer Füchse.

After a season's hiatus, Johansson returned to competitive hockey during the 2018–19 season, agreeing to a contract with Swedish Division 2 club, HA74, on 20 December 2018.

== Career statistics ==
=== Regular season and playoffs ===
			Regular season					Playoffs
Season	Team	League	GP	G	A	Pts	PIM	GP	G	A	Pts	PIM
1999–2000	HV71	J18 Allsv	9	6	3	9	2	—	—	—	—	—
2000–01	HV71	J18 Allsv	8	7	6	13	10	2	1	0	1	0
2000–01	HV71	J20	15	5	2	7	4	2	0	0	0	0
2001–02	HV71	J20	26	15	19	34	20	—	—	—	—	—
2001–02	HV71	SEL	5	0	0	0	0	2	0	0	0	0
2002–03	Kamloops Blazers	WHL	26	10	25	35	8	6	1	2	3	4
2003–04	Kamloops Blazers	WHL	72	18	19	37	70	5	2	2	4	4
2004–05	Portland Pirates	AHL	50	3	6	9	8	—	—	—	—	—
2004–05	South Carolina Stingrays	ECHL	5	4	2	6	10	—	—	—	—	—
2005–06	Hershey Bears	AHL	37	5	5	10	24	2	1	0	1	4
2005–06	South Carolina Stingrays	ECHL	5	5	3	8	2	—	—	—	—	—
2005–06	Washington Capitals	NHL	1	0	0	0	2	—	—	—	—	—
2006–07	Hershey Bears	AHL	44	5	19	24	48	—	—	—	—	—
2006–07	Grand Rapids Griffins	AHL	12	3	2	5	10	—	—	—	—	—
2007–08	HV71	SEL	47	4	1	5	12	17	1	0	1	0
2008–09	HV71	SEL	50	2	4	6	18	9	0	0	0	0
2009–10	VIK Västerås HK	Allsv	36	6	3	9	18	—	—	—	—	—
2010–11	SG Cortina	ITA	39	23	24	47	14	—	—	—	—	—
2011–12	SG Cortina	ITA	41	21	26	47	20	9	4	3	7	6
2012–13	HC Alleghe	ITA	35	9	24	33	16	3	0	0	0	0
2013–14	Frisk Asker	NOR	44	28	16	44	42	5	1	1	2	14
2014–15	Lausitzer Füchse	DEL2	44	20	36	56	8	3	0	2	2	2
2015–16	Stavanger Oilers	NOR	21	3	7	10	10	—	—	—	—	—
2015–16	SønderjyskE	DEN	7	0	3	3	0	—	—	—	—	—
2015–16	IF Troja/Ljungby	SWE.3	12	4	4	8	6	16	5	2	7	4
2016–17	HC Gherdëina	AlpsHL	33	8	21	29	36	—	—	—	—	—
2018–19	HA74	SWE.4	11	4	14	18	2	—	—	—	—	—
2019–20	HA74	SWE.4	14	7	9	16	8	2	1	2	3	0
SEL totals			102	6	5	11	30	28	1	0	1	0
NHL totals			1	0	0	0	2	—	—	—	—	—
AHL totals			143	16	32	48	90	2	1	0	1	4

=== International ===
Year	Team	Event	Result	GP	G	A	Pts	PIM
2002	Sweden	WJC18	9th	8	5	1	6	18
Junior totals				8	5	1	6	18

== Awards ==
- AHL Calder Cup champion with Hershey Bears in 2006.
- Swedish Champion with HV71 in 2008.
- Coppa Italia champion 2012 with SG Cortina
- All star team coppa Italia 2012

Awards and achievements
Preceded by Václav Nedorost	Colorado Avalanche first-round draft pick 2002	Succeeded by Wojtek Wolski
