= David Švagrovský =

Czech ice hockey player

- Born: December 21, 1984 (age 41) Prague, Czechoslovakia
- Height: 6 ft 4 in (193 cm)
- Weight: 214 lb (97 kg; 15 st 4 lb)
- Position: Forward
- Shot: Right
- Played for: Lowell Lock Monsters; Albany River Rats; HC Sparta Praha; HC Slavia Praha; HC Pardubice; HC Hradec Králové
- NHL draft: 131st overall, 2003; Colorado Avalanche
- Playing career: 2004–2017

David Švagrovský (born December 21, 1984) is a Czech former professional ice hockey player. He most notably played in the Czech Extraliga (ELH).

== Playing career ==
He was selected by the Colorado Avalanche in the 4th round (131st overall) of the 2003 NHL entry draft from the major junior club, the Seattle Thunderbirds of the Western Hockey League. Švagrovský played his first three professional seasons with Avalanche affiliates in the North American minor leagues, before returning to the Czech Republic for the majority of his playing career.

Švagrovský played with HC Slavia Praha in the Czech Extraliga during the 2010–11 Czech Extraliga season.

On May 11, 2012, in need of a new challenge after four seasons with HC Berounští Medvědi, Švagrovský signed a two-year contract to remain in the Czech first division with rivals HC Hradec Králové.

After the completion of the 2016–17 season with HC Litoměřice, Švagrovský ended his 13-year professional career, accepting a scouting position on August 28, 2017.

== Career statistics ==
			Regular season					Playoffs
Season	Team	League	GP	G	A	Pts	PIM	GP	G	A	Pts	PIM
1999–2000	HC Slavia Praha	CZE U18	31	1	3	4	12	—	—	—	—	—
2000–01	HC Slavia Praha	CZE U18	48	20	29	49	82	7	5	1	6	10
2001–02	HC Slavia Praha	CZE U20	44	7	6	13	38	—	—	—	—	—
2002–03	Seattle Thunderbirds	WHL	68	17	25	42	47	15	4	6	10	12
2003–04	Seattle Thunderbirds	WHL	52	6	11	17	42	—	—	—	—	—
2004–05	Colorado Eagles	CHL	35	1	3	4	55	—	—	—	—	—
2005–06	San Diego Gulls	ECHL	26	3	5	8	33	—	—	—	—	—
2005–06	Lowell Lock Monsters	AHL	27	0	1	1	17	—	—	—	—	—
2006–07	Arizona Sundogs	CHL	46	10	5	15	69	11	1	1	2	16
2006–07	Albany River Rats	AHL	3	0	1	1	0	—	—	—	—	—
2007–08	HC Sparta Praha	ELH	20	1	0	1	10	2	0	0	0	4
2007–08	HC Benátky nad Jizerou	CZE.3	6	2	1	3	8	9	5	4	9	10
2008–09	HC Kometa Brno	CZE.2	52	1	10	11	28	—	—	—	—	—
2008–09	HC Berounští Medvědi	CZE.2	2	1	0	1	2	—	—	—	—	—
2009–10	HC Berounští Medvědi	CZE.2	40	10	15	25	38	—	—	—	—	—
2010–11	HC Berounští Medvědi	CZE.2	41	8	16	24	50	4	0	1	1	27
2010–11	HC Slavia Praha	ELH	1	0	0	0	0	—	—	—	—	—
2011–12	HC Berounští Medvědi	CZE.2	51	15	18	33	30	—	—	—	—	—
2012–13	Královští lvi Hradec Králové	CZE.2	49	16	17	33	63	6	2	1	3	8
2012–13	HC ČSOB Pojišťovna Pardubice	ELH	1	0	0	0	0	—	—	—	—	—
2013–14	Mountfield HK	ELH	18	0	4	4	6	5	1	0	1	6
2013–14	HC Stadion Litoměřice	CZE.2	34	7	8	15	57	2	0	0	0	60
2014–15	Mountfield HK	ELH	4	0	0	0	2	—	—	—	—	—
2014–15	HC Stadion Litoměřice	CZE.2	50	18	17	35	40	3	1	0	1	4
2015–16	Mountfield HK	ELH	2	0	0	0	2	—	—	—	—	—
2015–16	HC Stadion Litoměřice	CZE.2	42	8	10	18	40	3	1	0	1	0
2016–17	HC Stadion Litoměřice	CZE.2	35	7	7	14	24	—	—	—	—	—
ELH totals			46	1	4	5	20	7	1	0	1	10
CZE.2 totals			382	96	127	223	380	18	4	2	6	99
