= 2003 NHL entry draft =

2003 North American ice hockey draft

General information
- Date: June 21–22, 2003
- Location: Gaylord Entertainment Center; Nashville, Tennessee, U.S.

Overview
- 292 total selections in 9 rounds
- First selection: (Canada) Marc-Andre Fleury (Pittsburgh Penguins)
- Hall of Famers: 2: C Patrice Bergeron; D Shea Weber

The 2003 NHL entry draft was the 41st draft for the National Hockey League. It was held at the Gaylord Entertainment Center in Nashville, Tennessee, on June 21 and 22, 2003.

Goaltender Marc-Andre Fleury was selected first overall by the Pittsburgh Penguins. This was only the third time a goaltender was selected first overall in the draft, after Michel Plasse in 1968 and Rick DiPietro in 2000. Eric Staal was selected second by the Carolina Hurricanes, and Nathan Horton was the third selection by the Florida Panthers.

Many analysts rate this draft as having one of the most talented groups of players, some say even better than the 1979 NHL draft. Every first-round pick went on to play in a regular season NHL game. Among those, two played only a handful of games: Hugh Jessiman (2 games) and Shawn Belle (20). All other first-round picks had much more substantial NHL careers: the third-fewest games was Marc-Antoine Pouliot with 192. Fleury, Staal, Horton, Nikolay Zherdev, and Patrice Bergeron all became NHL regulars immediately after they were drafted. Milan Michalek was expected to do the same, and was selected for the San Jose Sharks' NHL roster after training camp, but suffered a serious knee injury that ruled him out for the season. All of the top ten selections played at least nine games in the NHL in the 2005–06 season. Calgary Flames' first round selection Dion Phaneuf scored 20 goals in his rookie campaign, becoming the third defenceman to do so, after Brian Leetch and Barry Beck. Mike Richards and Jeff Carter (Flyers), Zach Parise (Devils), Ryan Getzlaf (Ducks), and Eric Staal (Hurricanes) all led their teams in scoring in the 2007–08 regular season, and Dustin Brown (Kings) went on to break the record for most Stanley Cups won by an American team captain (two, in 2012 and 2014).

Later rounds of the draft also featured more players than usual that went on to have substantial NHL careers. These included Shea Weber (49th overall pick), Corey Crawford (52nd), David Backes (62nd), Jimmy Howard (64th), Clarke MacArthur (74th), Jan Hejda (106th), Paul Bissonnette (121st), Kyle Quincey (132nd), Lee Stempniak (148th), Nigel Dawes (149th), Marc Methot (168th), Nate Thompson (183rd), Drew Miller (186th), Joe Pavelski (205th), Kyle Brodziak (214th), Tobias Enstrom (239th), Dustin Byfuglien (245th), Shane O'Brien (250th), Matt Moulson (263rd), Jaroslav Halak (271st), David Jones (288th), and Brian Elliott (291st).

The Florida Panthers attempted to draft Alexander Ovechkin (the first overall pick in the 2004 NHL entry draft), who was born September 17, 1985 - two days later than the cutoff for the 2003 draft - four times during the draft (including a formal submission in writing in the ninth round), arguing that if not due to leap years, he would have been born four days earlier, but were denied.

As of 2026, the remaining active players in the NHL from this draft are Brent Burns and Corey Perry.

== Draft day trades ==
The following trades were made on the day of the draft:

- The Pittsburgh Penguins traded the third overall pick (Nathan Horton), the 55th pick (Stefan Meyer), and Mikael Samuelsson to the Florida Panthers for the first overall pick (Marc-Andre Fleury) and the 73rd pick (Daniel Carcillo)
- The St. Louis Blues traded Cory Stillman to the Tampa Bay Lightning for the 62nd pick (David Backes).
- The New Jersey Devils traded Mike Danton and the 101st pick (Konstantin Zakharov) to the St. Louis Blues for the 93rd pick (Ivan Khomutov).
- The Chicago Blackhawks traded Andrei Nikolishin to the Colorado Avalanche for the 120th pick (Mitch Maunu)
- The St. Louis Blues traded Tyson Nash to the Phoenix Coyotes for the 148th pick (Lee Stempniak)

== Final central scouting rankings ==
=== Skaters ===
	North American	European
1	(Canada) Eric Staal (C)	(Russia) Nikolay Zherdev (RW)
2	(United States) Dustin Brown (RW)	(Czech Republic) Milan Michalek (LW)
3	(Austria) Thomas Vanek (LW)	(Belarus) Andrei Kostitsyn (RW)
4	(Canada) Nathan Horton (C)	(Russia) Dmitri Chernykh (RW)
5	(Canada) Ryan Getzlaf (C)	(Russia) Konstantin Glazachev (LW)
6	(Canada) Braydon Coburn (D)	(Russia) Igor Mirnov (C)
7	(United States) Ryan Suter (D)	(Russia) Grigory Shafigulin (C)
8	(Canada) Dion Phaneuf (D)	(Russia) Yevgeni Tunik (C)
9	(United States) Zach Parise (C)	(Sweden) Robert Nilsson (RW)
10	(United States) Dan Fritsche (C)	(Czech Republic) Michal Barinka (D)

=== Goaltenders ===
	North American	European
1	(Canada) Marc-Andre Fleury	(Russia) Konstantin Barulin
2	(United States) Jimmy Howard	(Finland) Teemu Lassila
3	(Canada) Ryan Munce	(Germany) Patrick Ehelechner

== Selections by round ==
= NHL All-Star team ·	= NHL All-Star (Note: Players are identified as an All-Star if they were selected for the All-Star game at any time in their career.) ·	= NHL All-Star and NHL All-Star team ·	= Hall of Famers

=== Round one ===
#	Player	Nationality	NHL team	College/junior/club team
1	Marc-Andre Fleury (G)	Canada	Pittsburgh Penguins (from Florida)	Cape Breton Screaming Eagles (QMJHL)
2	Eric Staal (C)	Canada	Carolina Hurricanes	Peterborough Petes (OHL)
3	Nathan Horton (RW)	Canada	Florida Panthers (from Pittsburgh)	Oshawa Generals (OHL)
4	Nikolay Zherdev (RW)	Russia	Columbus Blue Jackets	CSKA Moscow (Russia)
5	Thomas Vanek (LW)	Austria	Buffalo Sabres	University of Minnesota (NCAA)
6	Milan Michalek (LW)	Czech Republic	San Jose Sharks	HC Ceske Budejovice (Czech Republic)
7	Ryan Suter (D)	United States	Nashville Predators	US Nat'l U-18 (NAHL)
8	Braydon Coburn (D)	Canada	Atlanta Thrashers	Portland Winterhawks (WHL)
9	Dion Phaneuf (D)	Canada	Calgary Flames	Red Deer Rebels (WHL)
10	Andrei Kostitsyn (RW)	Belarus	Montreal Canadiens	CSKA Moscow (Russia)
11	Jeff Carter (C)	Canada	Philadelphia Flyers (from Phoenix)	Sault Ste. Marie Greyhounds (OHL)
12	Hugh Jessiman (RW)	United States	New York Rangers	Dartmouth College (NCAA)
13	Dustin Brown (RW)	United States	Los Angeles Kings	Guelph Storm (OHL)
14	Brent Seabrook (D)	Canada	Chicago Blackhawks	Lethbridge Hurricanes (WHL)
15	Robert Nilsson (RW)	Sweden	New York Islanders	Leksands IF (Sweden)
16	Steve Bernier (RW)	Canada	San Jose Sharks (from Boston)	Moncton Wildcats (QMJHL)
17	Zach Parise (LW)	United States	New Jersey Devils (from Edmonton)	University of North Dakota (NCAA)
18	Eric Fehr (RW)	Canada	Washington Capitals	Brandon Wheat Kings (WHL)
19	Ryan Getzlaf (C)	Canada	Mighty Ducks of Anaheim	Calgary Hitmen (WHL)
20	Brent Burns (RW)	Canada	Minnesota Wild	Brampton Battalion (OHL)
21	Mark Stuart (D)	United States	Boston Bruins (from Toronto via San Jose)	Colorado College (NCAA)
22	Marc-Antoine Pouliot (C)	Canada	Edmonton Oilers (from St. Louis via New Jersey)	Rimouski Oceanic (QMJHL)
23	Ryan Kesler (C)	United States	Vancouver Canucks	Ohio State University (NCAA)
24	Mike Richards (C)	Canada	Philadelphia Flyers	Kitchener Rangers (OHL)
25	Anthony Stewart (RW)	Canada	Florida Panthers (from Tampa Bay)	Kingston Frontenacs (OHL)
26	Brian Boyle (C)	United States	Los Angeles Kings (from Colorado)	Saint Sebastian's School (USHS-MA)
27	Jeff Tambellini (LW)	Canada	Los Angeles Kings (from Detroit)	University of Michigan (NCAA)
28	Corey Perry (RW)	Canada	Mighty Ducks of Anaheim (from Dallas)	London Knights (OHL)
29	Patrick Eaves (RW)	United States	Ottawa Senators	Boston College (NCAA)
30	Shawn Belle (D)	Canada	St. Louis Blues (from New Jersey)	Tri-City Americans (WHL)

=== Round two ===
#	Player	Nationality	NHL team	College/junior/club team
31	Danny Richmond (RW)	United States	Carolina Hurricanes	University of Michigan (NCAA)
32	Ryan Stone (C)	Canada	Pittsburgh Penguins	Brandon Wheat Kings (WHL)
33	Loui Eriksson (LW)	Sweden	Dallas Stars (from Columbus)	Frolunda HC (Sweden)
34	Mike Egener (D)	Canada	Tampa Bay Lightning (from Florida)	Calgary Hitmen (WHL)
35	Konstantin Glazachev (LW)	Russia	Nashville Predators (from Buffalo)	Lokomotiv Yaroslavl (Russia)
36	Vojtech Polak (RW)	Czech Republic	Dallas Stars (from San Jose via Anaheim)	Energie Karlovy Vary (Czech Republic)
37	Kevin Klein (D)	Canada	Nashville Predators	Toronto St. Michael's Majors (OHL)
38	Kamil Kreps (C)	Czech Republic	Florida Panthers (from Atlanta)	Brampton Battalion (OHL)
39	Tim Ramholt (D)	Switzerland	Calgary Flames	ZSC Lions (Switzerland)
40	Cory Urquhart (C)	Canada	Montreal Canadiens	Montreal Rocket (QMJHL)
41	Matt Smaby (D)	United States	Tampa Bay Lightning (from Phoenix via Florida)	Shattuck-Saint Mary's (Midget Major AAA)
42	Petr Vrana (LW)	Czech Republic	New Jersey Devils (compensatory)	Halifax Mooseheads (QMJHL)
43	Josh Hennessy (C)	United States	San Jose Sharks (from New York Rangers)	Quebec Remparts (QMJHL)
44	Konstantin Pushkaryov (LW)	Kazakhstan	Los Angeles Kings	Torpedo Ust-Kamenogorsk (Kazakhstan)
45	Patrice Bergeron (C)	Canada	Boston Bruins (compensatory)	Acadie-Bathurst Titan (QMJHL)
46	Dan Fritsche (C)	United States	Columbus Blue Jackets (from Chicago)	Sarnia Sting (OHL)
47	Matt Carle (D)	United States	San Jose Sharks (from Calgary; compensatory)	River City Lancers (USHL)
48	Dmitri Chernykh (RW)	Russia	New York Islanders	Khimik Moscow Oblast (Russia)
49	Shea Weber (D)	Canada	Nashville Predators (compensatory)	Kelowna Rockets (WHL)
50	Ivan Baranka (D)	Slovakia	New York Rangers (from Boston via San Jose)	Dubnica Spartak (Slovakia)
51	Colin McDonald (RW)	United States	Edmonton Oilers	New England Jr. Coyotes (EJHL)
52	Corey Crawford (G)	Canada	Chicago Blackhawks (compensatory)	Moncton Wildcats (QMJHL)
53	Yevgeni Tunik (C)	Russia	New York Islanders (from Washington via Edmonton)	Kristall Elektrostal (Russia)
54	B. J. Crombeen (RW)	United States	Dallas Stars (from Anaheim)	Barrie Colts (OHL)
55	Stefan Meyer (LW)	Canada	Florida Panthers (from Pittsburgh; compensatory)	Medicine Hat Tigers (WHL)
56	Patrick O'Sullivan (C)	United States	Minnesota Wild	Mississauga IceDogs (OHL)
57	John Doherty (D)	United States	Toronto Maple Leafs	Phillips Academy (USHS-MA)
58	Jeremy Colliton (C)	Canada	New York Islanders (from St. Louis)	Prince Albert Raiders (WHL)
59	Michal Barinka (D)	Czech Republic	Chicago Blackhawks (compensatory)	HC Ceske Budejovice (Czech Republic)
60	Marc-Andre Bernier (RW)	Canada	Vancouver Canucks	Halifax Mooseheads (QMJHL)
61	Maxim Lapierre (C)	Canada	Montreal Canadiens (from Philadelphia)	Montreal Rocket (QMJHL)
62	David Backes (RW)	United States	St. Louis Blues (from Tampa Bay)	Lincoln Stars (USHL)
63	David Liffiton (D)	Canada	Colorado Avalanche	Plymouth Whalers (OHL)
64	Jimmy Howard (G)	United States	Detroit Red Wings	University of Maine (NCAA)
65	Branislav Fabry (RW)	Slovakia	Buffalo Sabres (from Dallas)	Slovan Bratislava (Slovakia)
66	Masi Marjamaki (LW)	Finland	Boston Bruins (from San Jose; compensatory)	Red Deer Rebels (WHL)
67	Igor Mirnov (C)	Russia	Ottawa Senators	Dynamo Moscow (Russia)
68	Jean-Francois Jacques (LW)	Canada	Edmonton Oilers (from New Jersey)	Baie-Comeau Drakkar (QMJHL)

=== Round three ===
#	Player	Nationality	NHL team	College/junior/club team
69	Colin Fraser (C)	Canada	Philadelphia Flyers (from Carolina)	Red Deer Rebels (WHL)
70	Jonathan Filewich (RW)	Canada	Pittsburgh Penguins	Prince George Cougars (WHL)
71	Dmitri Kosmachev (D)	Russia	Columbus Blue Jackets	CSKA Moscow (Russia)
72	Mikhail Zhukov (RW)	Russia	Edmonton Oilers (compensatory)	IFK Arboga IK (Sweden)
73	Daniel Carcillo (LW)	Canada	Pittsburgh Penguins (from Florida)	Sarnia Sting (OHL)
74	Clarke MacArthur (LW)	Canada	Buffalo Sabres	Medicine Hat Tigers (WHL)
75	Ken Roche (C)	United States	New York Rangers (from San Jose)	Saint Sebastian's School (USHS-MA)
76	Richard Stehlik (D)	Slovakia	Nashville Predators	Sherbrooke Castors (QMJHL)
77	Tyler Redenbach (LW)	Canada	Phoenix Coyotes (from Atlanta via Philadelphia)	Swift Current Broncos (WHL)
78	Danny Irmen (C)	United States	Minnesota Wild (from Calgary via Toronto)	Lincoln Stars (USHL)
79	Ryan O'Byrne (D)	Canada	Montreal Canadiens	Cornell University (ECAC)
80	Dmitri Pestunov (C)	Russia	Phoenix Coyotes (from Phoenix via Vancouver)	Metallurg Magnitogorsk (Russia)
81	Stefan Ruzicka (RW)	Slovakia	Philadelphia Flyers (from New York Rangers)	Ardo Nitra (Slovakia)
82	Ryan Munce (G)	Canada	Los Angeles Kings	Sarnia Sting (OHL)
83	Stephen Werner (RW)	United States	Washington Capitals (from Chicago)	University of Massachusetts (NCAA)
84	Konstantin Barulin (G)	Russia	St. Louis Blues (from New York Islanders)	Rubin Tyumen (Russia)
85	Alexandre Picard (D)	Canada	Philadelphia Flyers (compensatory)	Halifax Mooseheads (QMJHL)
86	Shane Hynes (RW)	Canada	Mighty Ducks of Anaheim (from Boston)	Cornell University (NCAA)
87	Ryan Potulny (C)	United States	Philadelphia Flyers (from Edmonton)	Lincoln Stars (USHL)
88	Zack Fitzgerald (D)	United States	St. Louis Blues (compensatory)	Seattle Thunderbirds (WHL)
89	Paul Brown (RW)	Canada	Nashville Predators (from Washington)	Kamloops Blazers (WHL)
90	Juha Alen (D)	Finland	Mighty Ducks of Anaheim	Northern Michigan University (NCAA)
91	Martin Sagat (LW)	Slovakia	Toronto Maple Leafs (from Minnesota)	Dukla Trencin (Slovakia)
92	Alexander Sulzer (D)	Germany	Nashville Predators (from Toronto)	Hamburg Freezers (Germany)
93	Ivan Khomutov (C)	Russia	New Jersey Devils (from St. Louis)	Kristall Elektrostal (Russia)
94	Zack Stortini (RW)	Canada	Edmonton Oilers (from Vancouver via Washington)	Sudbury Wolves (OHL)
95	Rick Kozak (RW)	Canada	Philadelphia Flyers	Brandon Wheat Kings (WHL)
96	Jonathan Boutin (G)	Canada	Tampa Bay Lightning	Halifax Mooseheads (QMJHL)
97	Ryan Donally (LW)	Canada	Calgary Flames (from Colorado via San Jose)	Windsor Spitfires (OHL)
98	Grigory Shafigulin (C)	Russia	Nashville Predators (from Detroit)	Lokomotiv Yaroslavl (Russia)
99	Matt Nickerson (D)	United States	Dallas Stars	Texas Tornado (NAHL)
100	Philippe Seydoux (D)	Switzerland	Ottawa Senators	Kloten Flyers (Switzerland)
101	Konstantin Zakharov (F)	Belarus	St. Louis Blues (from New Jersey)	Yunost Minsk (Belarus)

=== Round four ===
#	Player	Nationality	NHL team	College/junior/club team
102	Aaron Dawson (D)	United States	Carolina Hurricanes	Peterborough Petes (OHL)
103	Kevin Jarman (LW)	Canada	Columbus Blue Jackets (from Pittsburgh)	Stouffville Spirit (OPJHL)
104	Philippe Dupuis (C)	Canada	Columbus Blue Jackets	Hull Olympiques (QMJHL)
105	Martin Lojek (D)	Czech Republic	Florida Panthers	Brampton Battalion (OHL)
106	Jan Hejda (D)	Czech Republic	Buffalo Sabres	Slavia Praha (Czech Republic)
107	Byron Bitz (RW)	Canada	Boston Bruins (from San Jose Sharks)	Nanaimo Clippers (BCHL)
108	Kevin Romy (RW)	Switzerland	Philadelphia Flyers (compensatory)	Geneve-Servette HC (Switzerland)
109	Andreas Valdix (LW)	Sweden	Washington Capitals (from Nashville via Montreal)	Malmo Redhawks (Sweden)
110	Jim Sharrow (D)	United States	Atlanta Thrashers	Halifax Mooseheads (QMJHL)
111	Brandon Nolan (LW)	Canada	Vancouver Canucks (compensatory)	Oshawa Generals (OHL)
112	Jamie Tardif (RW)	Canada	Calgary Flames	Peterborough Petes (OHL)
113	Corey Locke (C)	Canada	Montreal Canadiens	Ottawa 67's (OHL)
114	Denis Ezhov (D)	Russia	Buffalo Sabres (compensatory)	Lada Togliatti (Russia)
115	Liam Lindstrom (C)	Sweden	Phoenix Coyotes	Mora IK (Sweden)
116	Guillaume Desbiens (RW)	Canada	Atlanta Thrashers (from New York Rangers via Florida)	Rouyn-Noranda Huskies (QMJHL)
117	Teemu Lassila (G)	Finland	Nashville Predators (from Los Angeles)	TPS (Finland)
118	Frank Rediker (D)	United States	Boston Bruins (compensatory)	Windsor Spitfires (OHL)
119	Nathan Saunders (D)	Canada	Mighty Ducks of Anaheim (from Chicago via Nashville)	Moncton Wildcats (QMJHL)
120	Stefan Blaho (RW)	Slovakia	New York Islanders	Dukla Trencin (Slovakia)
121	Paul Bissonnette (D)	Canada	Pittsburgh Penguins (from Boston)	Saginaw Spirit (OHL)
122	Corey Potter (D)	United States	New York Rangers (from Edmonton)	Michigan State University (NCAA)
123	Danny Stewart (LW)	Canada	Montreal Canadiens (from Washington)	Rimouski Oceanic (QMJHL)
124	James Pemberton (D)	United States	Florida Panthers (from Anaheim)	Providence College (NCAA)
125	Konstantin Volkov (RW)	Russia	Toronto Maple Leafs (from Minnesota)	Dynamo Moscow (Russia)
126	Kevin Nastiuk (G)	Canada	Carolina Hurricanes (from Toronto)	Medicine Hat Tigers (WHL)
127	Alexandre Bolduc (C)	Canada	St. Louis Blues	Rouyn-Noranda Huskies (QMJHL)
128	Ty Morris (LW)	Canada	Vancouver Canucks	St. Albert (AJHL)
129	Patrik Valcak (RW)	Czech Republic	Boston Bruins (from Philadelphia via Los Angeles)	HC Vitkovice Jr. (Czech Republic)
130	Matej Trojovsky (D)	Czech Republic	Carolina Hurricanes (from Tampa Bay)	Regina Pats (WHL)
131	David Svagrovsky (RW)	Czech Republic	Colorado Avalanche	Seattle Thunderbirds (WHL)
132	Kyle Quincey (D)	Canada	Detroit Red Wings	Mississauga IceDogs (OHL)
133	Rustam Sidikov (G)	Russia	Nashville Predators (compensatory)	CSKA Moscow (Russia)
134	Alexander Naurov (RW)	Russia	Dallas Stars	Lokomotiv Yaroslavl (Russia)
135	Mattias Karlsson (D)	Sweden	Ottawa Senators	Brynas IF (Sweden)
136	Michael Vannelli (D)	United States	Atlanta Thrashers (from New Jersey)	Sioux Falls Stampede (USHL)

=== Round five ===
#	Player	Nationality	NHL team	College/junior/club team
137	Tyson Strachan (D)	Canada	Carolina Hurricanes (compensatory)	Vernon Vipers (BCHL)
138	Arsi Piispanen (RW)	Finland	Columbus Blue Jackets (from Carolina)	Jokerit (Finland)
139	Patrick Ehelechner (G)	Germany	San Jose Sharks (from Pittsburgh)	Hannover Scorpions (Germany)
140	David Tremblay (G)	Canada	Philadelphia Flyers (from Columbus)	Hull Olympiques (QMJHL)
141	Dan Travis (RW)	United States	Florida Panthers	Deerfield Academy (USHS-MA)
142	Tim Cook (D)	United States	Ottawa Senators (from Buffalo)	River City Lancers (USHL)
143	Greg Moore (RW)	United States	Calgary Flames (from San Jose)	University of Maine (NCAA)
144	Eero Kilpelainen (G)	Finland	Dallas Stars (from Nashville)	KalPa (Finland)
145	Brett Sterling (LW)	United States	Atlanta Thrashers	Colorado College (NCAA)
146	Mark McCutcheon (C)	United States	Colorado Avalanche (from Calgary)	New England Junior Falcons (EJHL)
147	Kalle Olsson (RW)	Sweden	Edmonton Oilers (from Montreal)	Frolunda HC (Sweden)
148	Lee Stempniak (RW)	United States	St. Louis Blues (from Phoenix)	Dartmouth College (NCAA)
149	Nigel Dawes (LW)	Canada	New York Rangers	Kootenay Ice (WHL)
150	Thomas Morrow (D)	United States	Buffalo Sabres (from Los Angeles)	Des Moines Buccaneers (USHL)
151	Lasse Kukkonen (D)	Finland	Chicago Blackhawks	Karpat (Finland)
152	Brady Murray (C)	Canada	Los Angeles Kings (from New York Islanders via Florida)	Salmon Arm Silverbacks (BCHL)
153	Mike Brown (G)	United States	Boston Bruins	Saginaw Spirit (OHL)
154	David Rohlfs (RW)	United States	Edmonton Oilers	Detroit Compuware Ambassadors (NAHL)
155	Josh Robertson (C)	United States	Washington Capitals	Proctor High School (USHS-MN)
156	Alexei Ivanov (C)	Russia	Chicago Blackhawks (from Anaheim)	Lokomotiv Yaroslavl (Russia)
157	Marcin Kolusz (F)	Poland	Minnesota Wild	Podhale Nowy Targ (Poland)
158	John Mitchell (C)	Canada	Toronto Maple Leafs	Plymouth Whalers (OHL)
159	Chris Beckford-Tseu (G)	Canada	St. Louis Blues	Oshawa Generals (OHL)
160	Nicklas Danielsson (RW)	Sweden	Vancouver Canucks	Brynas IF (Sweden)
161	Evgeny Isakov (LW)	Russia	Pittsburgh Penguins (from Philadelphia via New York Islanders)	Severstal Cherepovets (Russia)
162	Martin Tuma (D)	Czech Republic	Florida Panthers (from Tampa Bay)	HC Litvinov Jr. (Czech Republic)
163	Brad Richardson (C)	Canada	Colorado Avalanche (from Colorado via San Jose)	Owen Sound Attack (OHL)
164	Ryan Oulahen (C)	Canada	Detroit Red Wings	Brampton Battalion (OHL)
165	Gino Guyer (C)	United States	Dallas Stars	University of Minnesota (NCAA)
166	Sergei Gimayev (D)	Russia	Ottawa Senators	Severstal Cherepovets (Russia)
167	Zach Tarkir (D)	United States	New Jersey Devils	Chilliwack Chiefs (BCHL)

=== Round six ===
#	Player	Nationality	NHL team	College/junior/club team
168	Marc Methot (D)	Canada	Columbus Blue Jackets (from Carolina)	London Knights (OHL)
169	Lukas Bolf (D)	Czech Republic	Pittsburgh Penguins	Sparta Praha (Czech Republic)
170	Andreas Sundin (LW)	Sweden	Detroit Red Wings (from Columbus)	Linkopings HC (Sweden)
171	Denis Stasyuk (C)	Russia	Florida Panthers	Metallurg Novokuznetsk (Russia)
172	Pavel Voroshnin (D)	Russia	Buffalo Sabres	Mississauga IceDogs (OHL)
173	Tyler Johnson (C)	Canada	Calgary Flames (from San Jose)	Moose Jaw Warriors (WHL)
174	Esa Pirnes (C)	Finland	Los Angeles Kings (from Nashville)	Tappara (Finland)
175	Mike Hamilton (F)	Canada	Atlanta Thrashers	Merritt Centennials (BCHL)
176	Ivan Dornic (C)	Slovakia	New York Rangers (from Calgary)	Slovan Bratislava (Slovakia)
177	Christopher Heino-Lindberg (G)	Sweden	Montreal Canadiens	Hammarby IF (Sweden)
178	Ryan Gibbons (RW)	Canada	Phoenix Coyotes	Seattle Thunderbirds (WHL)
179	Philippe Furrer (D)	Switzerland	New York Rangers (from New York Rangers via San Jose)	Bern (Switzerland)
180	Chris Holt (G)	United States	New York Rangers (from Los Angeles)	US Nat'l U-18 (NAHL)
181	Johan Andersson (C)	Sweden	Chicago Blackhawks	Troja (Sweden)
182	Bruno Gervais (D)	Canada	New York Islanders	Acadie-Bathurst Titan (QMJHL)
183	Nate Thompson (C)	United States	Boston Bruins	Seattle Thunderbirds (WHL)
184	Dragan Umicevic (LW)	Sweden	Edmonton Oilers	Sodertalje SK (Sweden)
185	Francis Wathier (LW)	Canada	Dallas Stars (from Washington)	Hull Olympiques (QMJHL)
186	Drew Miller (LW)	United States	Mighty Ducks of Anaheim	River City Lancers (USHL)
187	Miroslav Kopriva (G)	Czech Republic	Minnesota Wild	Rabat Kladno (Czech Republic)
188	Mark Flood (D)	Canada	Montreal Canadiens (from Toronto)	Peterborough Petes (OHL)
189	Jonathan Lehun (C)	United States	St. Louis Blues	St. Cloud State University (NCAA)
190	Chad Brownlee (D)	Canada	Vancouver Canucks	Vernon Vipers (BCHL)
191	Rejean Beauchemin (G)	Canada	Philadelphia Flyers	Prince Albert Raiders (WHL)
192	Doug O'Brien (D)	Canada	Tampa Bay Lightning (from Tampa Bay via Florida)	Hull Olympiques (QMJHL)
193	Ville Hostikka (G)	Finland	Philadelphia Flyers (from Colorado)	SaiPa (Finland)
194	Stefan Blom (D)	Sweden	Detroit Red Wings	Hammarby IF (Sweden)
195	Drew Bagnall (D)	Canada	Dallas Stars (from Dallas via Atlanta)	Battlefords North Stars (SJHL)
196	Elias Granath (D)	Sweden	Dallas Stars (from Ottawa)	Leksands IF (Sweden)
197	Jason Smith (G)	Canada	New Jersey Devils	Lennoxville Cougars (LHJAAAQ)

=== Round seven ===
#	Player	Nationality	NHL team	College/junior/club team
198	Shay Stephenson (LW)	Canada	Carolina Hurricanes	Red Deer Rebels (WHL)
199	Andy Chiodo (G)	Canada	Pittsburgh Penguins	Toronto St. Michael's Majors (OHL)
200	Aleksandr Guskov (D)	Russia	Columbus Blue Jackets	Lokomotiv Yaroslavl (Russia)
201	Jonathan Tremblay (RW)	Canada	San Jose Sharks (from Florida)	Acadie-Bathurst Titan (QMJHL)
202	Nathan Paetsch (D)	Canada	Buffalo Sabres	Moose Jaw Warriors (WHL)
203	Denis Loginov (C)	Russia	Atlanta Thrashers (from San Jose)	Ak Bars Kazan (Russia)
204	Linus Videll (LW)	Sweden	Colorado Avalanche (from Nashville)	Sodertalje SK (Sweden)
205	Joe Pavelski (C)	United States	San Jose Sharks (from Atlanta via Philadelphia)	Waterloo Blackhawks (USHL)
206	Thomas Bellemare (D)	Canada	Calgary Flames	Drummondville Voltigeurs (QMJHL)
207	Georgi Misharin (D)	Russia	Minnesota Wild (from Montreal)	Dinamo-Energija Yekaterinburg (Russia)
208	Randall Gelech (RW)	Canada	Phoenix Coyotes	Kelowna Rockets (WHL)
209	Dylan Reese (D)	United States	New York Rangers	Pittsburgh (NAHL)
210	Andrei Mukhachyov (D)	Russia	Nashville Predators (from Los Angeles)	CSKA Moscow (Russia)
211	Mike Brodeur (G)	Canada	Chicago Blackhawks	Camrose Kodiaks (AJHL)
212	Denis Rehak (D)	Slovakia	New York Islanders	Dukla Trencin Jr. (Slovakia)
213	Miroslav Hanuljak (G)	Czech Republic	Nashville Predators (from Boston via Los Angeles)	HC Litvinov Jr. (Czech Republic)
214	Kyle Brodziak (C)	Canada	Edmonton Oilers (compensatory)	Moose Jaw Warriors (WHL)
215	Mathieu Roy (D)	Canada	Edmonton Oilers	Val-d'Or Foreurs (QMJHL)
216	Kai Hospelt (C)	Germany	San Jose Sharks (compensatory)	Kolner Haie (Germany)
217	Oskari Korpikari (D)	Finland	Montreal Canadiens (from Washington)	Karpat (Finland)
218	Dirk Southern (C)	Canada	Mighty Ducks of Anaheim	Northern Michigan University (NCAA)
219	Adam Courchaine (C)	Canada	Minnesota Wild	Vancouver Giants (WHL)
220	Jeremy Williams (C)	Canada	Toronto Maple Leafs	Swift Current Broncos (WHL)
221	Evgeny Skachkov (LW)	Russia	St. Louis Blues	Kapitan Stupino Jr. (Russia)
222	Francois-Pierre Guenette (C)	Canada	Vancouver Canucks	Halifax Mooseheads (QMJHL)
223	Dany Roussin (LW)	Canada	Florida Panthers (from Philadelphia)	Rimouski Oceanic (QMJHL)
224	Gerald Coleman (G)	United States	Tampa Bay Lightning	London Knights (OHL)
225	Brett Hemingway (RW)	Canada	Colorado Avalanche	Coquitlam Express (BCHL)
226	Tomas Kollar (LW)	Sweden	Detroit Red Wings	Hammarby IF (Sweden)
227	Jay Rosehill (LW)	Canada	Tampa Bay Lightning (from Dallas)	Olds Grizzlys (AJHL)
228	Will Colbert (D)	Canada	Ottawa Senators	Ottawa 67's (OHL)
229	Stephen Dixon (C)	Canada	Pittsburgh Penguins (from New Jersey)	Cape Breton Screaming Eagles (QMJHL)

=== Round eight ===
#	Player	Nationality	NHL team	College/junior/club team
230	Jamie Hoffmann (C)	United States	Carolina Hurricanes	Des Moines Buccaneers (USHL)
231	Matt Zaba (G)	Canada	Los Angeles Kings (compensatory)	Vernon (BCHL)
232	Joe Jensen (RW)	United States	Pittsburgh Penguins	St. Cloud State University (NCAA)
233	Mathieu Gravel (LW)	Canada	Columbus Blue Jackets	Shawinigan Cataractes (QMJHL)
234	Petr Kadlec (D)	Czech Republic	Florida Panthers	Slavia Praha (Czech Republic)
235	Jeff Weber (G)	Canada	Buffalo Sabres	Plymouth Whalers (OHL)
236	Alexander Hult (C)	Sweden	San Jose Sharks	Tranas AIF (Sweden)
237	Shaun Landolt (RW)	Canada	Toronto Maple Leafs (from Nashville)	Calgary Hitmen (WHL)
238	Cody Blanshan (D)	United States	New York Islanders (compensatory)	University of Nebraska Omaha (NCAA)
239	Tobias Enstrom (D)	Sweden	Atlanta Thrashers	MODO (Sweden)
240	Cam Cunning (LW)	Canada	Calgary Flames	Kamloops Blazers (WHL)
241	Jimmy Bonneau (LW)	Canada	Montreal Canadiens	Montreal Rocket (QMJHL)
242	Eduard Lewandowski (F)	Germany	Phoenix Coyotes	Kolner Haie (Germany)
243	Jan Marek (F)	Czech Republic	New York Rangers	HC Ocelari Trinic (Czech Republic)
244	Mike Sullivan (C)	Canada	Los Angeles Kings	Stouffville Spirit (OPJRA)
245	Dustin Byfuglien (D)	United States	Chicago Blackhawks	Prince George Cougars (WHL)
246	Igor Volkov (RW)	Russia	New York Islanders	Salavat Yulayev Ufa (Russia)
247	Patrick Devito (LW)	United States	Boston Bruins	Twin Cities Northern Lights (MNJHL)
248	Josef Hrabal (D)	Czech Republic	Edmonton Oilers	HC Vsetin (Czech Republic)
249	Andrew Joudrey (C)	Canada	Washington Capitals	Notre Dame Hounds (SJHL)
250	Shane O'Brien (D)	Canada	Mighty Ducks of Anaheim	Kingston Frontenacs (OHL)
251	Mathieu Melanson (LW)	Canada	Minnesota Wild	Chicoutimi Sagueneens (QMJHL)
252	Sergei Topol (C)	Russia	Vancouver Canucks (from Toronto)	Avangard Omsk (Russia)
253	Andrei Pervyshin (D)	Russia	St. Louis Blues	Lokomotiv Yaroslavl (Russia)
254	Nathan McIver (D)	Canada	Vancouver Canucks	Toronto St. Michael's Majors (OHL)
255	Raimonds Danilics (RW)	Latvia	Tampa Bay Lightning (from Philadelphia)	Stalkers Jr. (Latvia)
256	Brady Greco (D)	United States	Tampa Bay Lightning	Chicago Steel (USHL)
257	Darryl Yacboski (D)	Canada	Colorado Avalanche	Regina Pats (WHL)
258	Vladimir Kutny (LW)	Slovakia	Detroit Red Wings	Quebec Remparts (QMJHL)
259	Niko Vainio (D)	Finland	Dallas Stars	Jokerit (Finland)
260	Ossi Louhivaara (F)	Finland	Ottawa Senators	KooKoo Kouvola (Finland)
261	Joey Tenute (C)	Canada	New Jersey Devils	Sarnia Sting (OHL)

=== Round nine ===
#	Player	Nationality	NHL team	College/junior/club team
262	Ryan Rorabeck (C)	Canada	Carolina Hurricanes	Toronto St. Michael's Majors (OHL)
263	Matt Moulson (LW)	Canada	Pittsburgh Penguins	Cornell University (NCAA)
264	John Hecimovic (RW)	Canada	Florida Panthers (from Columbus)	Sarnia Sting (OHL)
265	Tanner Glass (F)	Canada	Florida Panthers	Dartmouth College (ECAC)
266	Louis-Philippe Martin (RW)	Canada	Buffalo Sabres	Baie-Comeau Drakkar (QMJHL)
267	Brian O'Hanley (D)	United States	San Jose Sharks	Boston College High School (USHS-MA)
268	Lauris Darzins (F)	Latvia	Nashville Predators	Lukko Jr. (Finland)
269	Rylan Kaip (C)	Canada	Atlanta Thrashers	Notre Dame Hounds (SJHL)
270	Kevin Harvey (LW)	Canada	Calgary Flames	Georgetown Raiders (OPJRA)
271	Jaroslav Halak (G)	Slovakia	Montreal Canadiens	Slovan Bratislava Jr. (Slovakia)
272	Sean Sullivan (D)	United States	Phoenix Coyotes	St. Sebastian's (USHS)
273	Albert Vishnyakov (LW)	Russia	Tampa Bay Lightning (from New York Rangers via Pittsburgh)	Ak Bars Kazan (Russia)
274	Marty Guerin (RW)	United States	Los Angeles Kings	Des Moines Buccaneers (USHL)
275	Michael Grenzy (D)	United States	Chicago Blackhawks	Chicago Steel (USHL)
276	Carter Lee (F)	United States	San Jose Sharks (from New York Islanders via Florida and Chicago)	Canterbury High School (USHS-CT)
277	Kevin Regan (G)	United States	Boston Bruins	St. Sebastian's (USHS)
278	Troy Bodie (RW)	Canada	Edmonton Oilers	Kelowna Rockets (WHL)
279	Mark Olafson (RW)	Canada	Washington Capitals (from Washington via Ottawa)	Kelowna Rockets (WHL)
280	Ville Mantymaa (D)	Finland	Mighty Ducks of Anaheim	Tappara (Finland)
281	Jean-Michel Bolduc (D)	United States	Minnesota Wild	Quebec Remparts (QMJHL)
282	Chris Porter (C)	Canada	Chicago Blackhawks (from Toronto)	Lincoln Stars (USHL)
283	Trevor Hendrikx (D)	Canada	Columbus Blue Jackets (from Los Angeles; compensatory)	Peterborough Petes (OHL)
284	Juhamatti Aaltonen (LW)	Finland	St. Louis Blues	Karpat (Finland)
285	Matthew Hansen (D)	Canada	Vancouver Canucks	Seattle Thunderbirds (WHL)
286	Zbynek Hrdel (C)	Czech Republic	Tampa Bay Lightning (from Philadelphia)	Rimouski Oceanic (QMJHL)
287	Nick Tarnasky (C)	Canada	Tampa Bay Lightning	Lethbridge Hurricanes (WHL)
288	David Jones (RW)	Canada	Colorado Avalanche	Coquitlam Express (BCHL)
289	Mikael Johansson (C)	Sweden	Detroit Red Wings	Arvika (Sweden)
290	Loic Burkhalter (F)	Switzerland	Phoenix Coyotes (from Dallas)	HC Ambri-Piotta (Switzerland)
291	Brian Elliott (G)	Canada	Ottawa Senators	Ajax Axemen (OPJRA)
292	Arseny Bondarev (LW)	Russia	New Jersey Devils	Lokomotiv Yaroslavl (Russia)

== Draftees based on nationality ==
Rank	Country	Picks	Percent	Top selection
	North America	188	64.5%	
1	Canada	126	43.2%	Marc-Andre Fleury, 1st
2	United States	62	21.2%	Ryan Suter, 7th
	Europe	104	35.6%	
3	Russia	30	10.3%	Nikolay Zherdev, 4th
4	Czech Republic	18	6.2%	Milan Michalek, 6th
5	Sweden	17	5.8%	Robert Nilsson, 15th
6	Finland	13	4.5%	Masi Marjamaki, 66th
7	Slovakia	10	3.4%	Ivan Baranka, 50th
8	Switzerland	5	1.7%	Tim Ramholt, 39th
9	Germany	4	1.4%	Alexander Sulzer, 92nd
10	Belarus	2	0.7%	Andrei Kostitsyn, 10th
10	Latvia	2	0.7%	Raimonds Danilics, 255th
12	Austria	1	0.3%	Thomas Vanek, 5th
12	Poland	1	0.3%	Marcin Kolusz, 157th
	Asia	1	0.3%	
12	Kazakhstan	1	0.3%	Konstantin Pushkaryov, 44th

== See also ==
- 2003–04 NHL season
- List of NHL first overall draft choices
- List of NHL players
