= 2005 World Junior Ice Hockey Championships rosters =

Below are the rosters for the 2005 World Junior Ice Hockey Championships held in the United States.

== Belarus ==
Coach: Mikhail Zakharov (Belarus)

#	Name	Pos	DOB	Club
3	Andrei Karev	D	February 12, 1985	Junost Minsk (Belarus)
4	Dzmitry Yadeshka	D	April 25, 1985	HK Gomel (Belarus)
5	Vadim Sushko	D	April 27, 1986	Dynamo Minsk (Belarus)
6	Vauhen Haranin	D	March 20, 1986	Dynamo Minsk (Belarus)
7	Siarhei Kolasau	D	May 22, 1986	Dynamo Minsk (Belarus)
9	Vadzim Karaha	F	January 3, 1985	Khimik-SKA Novopolotsk (Belarus)
10	Alexei Savin	F	May 15, 1986	Junost Minsk (Belarus)
12	Pavel Asmalouski	F	October 18, 1985	Dynamo Minsk (Belarus)
13	Raman Blokh	F	November 22, 1986	HK Gomel (Belarus)
15	Oleg Frolov	F	April 21, 1986	Dynamo Minsk (Belarus)
17	Viachaslau Shypila	D	August 30, 1985	HK Gomel (Belarus)
18	Alexei Ugarov	F	January 2, 1985	Junost Minsk (Belarus)
19	Aliaksei Shahau	D	January 2, 1986	Liepajas Metalurgs (Latvia)
21	Konstantin Zakharov	F	May 2, 1985	Worcester Ice Cats (United States)
22	Sergei Kostitsyn	F	March 20, 1987	HK Gomel (Belarus)
23	Andrei Kostitsyn	F	February 3, 1985	Hamilton Bulldogs (Canada)
24	Siarhei Giro	D	July 5, 1985	Junost Minsk (Belarus)
25	Stepan Goryachevskikh	G	June 26, 1985	Junost Minsk (Belarus)
26	Siarhei Kukushkin	F	July 24, 1985	Indianapolis Ice (United States)
27	Alexei Efyamenka	F	August 20, 1985	Junost Minsk (Belarus)
28	Artsiom Volkau	F	January 28, 1985	Junost Minsk (Belarus)
30	Dzmitry Milchakou	G	March 2, 1986	Dynamo Minsk (Belarus)

== Canada ==
Coach: Brent Sutter (Canada)

#	Name	Pos	DOB	Club
2	Brent Seabrook	D	April 20, 1985	Lethbridge Hurricanes (Canada)
3	Dion Phaneuf	D	April 10, 1985	Red Deer Rebels (Canada)
4	Shawn Belle	D	January 3, 1985	Tri-City Americans (United States)
6	Shea Weber	D	August 14, 1985	Kelowna Rockets (Canada)
7	Jeff Carter	F	January 1, 1985	Sault Ste. Marie Greyhounds (Canada)
9	Sidney Crosby	F	August 7, 1987	Rimouski Oceanic (Canada)
11	Colin Fraser	F	January 28, 1985	Red Deer Rebels (Canada)
12	Anthony Stewart	F	January 5, 1985	Kingston Frontenacs (Canada)
14	Stephen Dixon	F	September 7, 1985	Cape Breton Screaming Eagles (Canada)
15	Ryan Getzlaf	F	May 10, 1985	Calgary Hitmen (Canada)
17	Clarke MacArthur	F	April 6, 1985	Medicine Hat Tigers (Canada)
18	Mike Richards (captain)	F	February 11, 1985	Kitchener Rangers (Canada)
19	Andrew Ladd	F	December 12, 1985	Calgary Hitmen (Canada)
20	Danny Syvret	D	June 13, 1985	London Knights (Canada)
21	Jeremy Colliton	F	January 13, 1985	Prince Albert Raiders (Canada)
24	Corey Perry	F	May 16, 1985	London Knights (Canada)
25	Cam Barker	D	April 4, 1986	Medicine Hat Tigers (Canada)
27	Nigel Dawes	F	February 9, 1985	Kootenay Ice (Canada)
29	Braydon Coburn	D	February 27, 1985	Portland Winter Hawks (United States)
31	Jeff Glass	G	November 19, 1985	Kootenay Ice (Canada)
35	Réjean Beauchemin	G	April 20, 1985	Prince Albert Raiders (Canada)
37	Patrice Bergeron	F	July 24, 1985	Providence Bruins (United States)

== Czech Republic ==
Coach: Alois Hadamczik (Czech Republic)

#	Name	Pos	DOB	Club
2	Vladislav Koutský	G	April 19, 1985	HC Pardubice (Czech Republic)
3	Martin Lojek	D	August 19, 1985	Brampton Battalion (Canada)
6	Roman Polák	D	April 28, 1986	Kootenay Ice (Canada)
7	Martin Tuma	D	September 14, 1985	Sault Ste. Marie Greyhounds (Canada)
8	Ladislav Šmíd	D	February 1, 1986	HC Bílí Tygři Liberec (Czech Republic)
9	Bedrich Kohler	F	February 14, 1985	HC Vítkovice (Czech Republic)
10	Lukáš Bolf	D	February 20, 1985	Barrie Colts (Canada)
12	Ondřej Smach	D	July 21, 1986	HC JME Znojemští Orli (Czech Republic)
15	Zbyněk Hrdel	F	August 19, 1985	Rimouski Océanic (Canada)
16	David Krejčí	F	April 28, 1986	Gatineau Olympiques (Canada)
19	Marek Kvapil	F	January 5, 1985	Saginaw Spirit (United States)
20	Petr Vrána	F	March 29, 1985	Halifax Mooseheads (Canada)
21	Michal Gulaši	D	July 18, 1986	Lethbridge Hurricanes (Canada)
22	Lukáš Kašpar	F	September 23, 1985	Ottawa 67's (Canada)
23	Milan Hluchý	F	January 13, 1985	HC Kladno (Czech Republic)
24	Michal Borovanský	F	March 15, 1985	HC Slavia Prague (Czech Republic)
25	Rostislav Olesz	F	October 10, 1985	HC Sparta Prague (Czech Republic)
26	Michal Polák	F	January 11, 1985	HC Lasselsberger Plzeň (Czech Republic)
27	Michael Frolík	F	February 17, 1988	HC Kladno (Czech Republic)
28	Jakub Petružálek	F	April 24, 1985	Ottawa 67's (Canada)
29	Roman Červenka	F	December 10, 1985	HC Energie Karlovy Vary (Czech Republic)
30	Marek Schwarz	G	April 1, 1986	Vancouver Giants (Canada)

== Finland ==
Coach: Risto Dufva (Finland)

#	Name	Pos	DOB	Club
1	Joonas Hallikainen	G	October 5, 1985	Jokerit (Finland)
3	Anssi Tieranta	D	August 7, 1985	Ilves (Finland)
4	Otto Honkaheimo	D	August 3, 1985	Lukko (Finland)
5	Risto Korhonen	D	November 27, 1986	Kärpät (Finland)
7	Ville Mäntymaa	D	March 8, 1985	Tappara (Finland)
8	Iivo Hokkanen	F	May 3, 1985	Jukurit (Finland)
9	Petteri Nokelainen	F	January 16, 1986	SaiPa (Finland)
11	Teemu Nurmi	F	February 24, 1985	Tappara (Finland)
12	Mikko Kuukka	D	November 3, 1985	Red Deer Rebels (Canada)
13	Filip Riska	F	May 13, 1985	JYP (Finland)
15	Jesse Joensuu	F	October 5, 1987	Ässät (Finland)
16	Arsi Piispanen	F	July 23, 1985	JYP (Finland)
18	Aki Seitsonen	F	February 5, 1986	Prince Albert Raiders (Canada)
19	Masi Marjamäki	F	January 16, 1985	Moose Jaw Warriors (Canada)
23	Kim Nabb	F	April 30, 1985	Sport (Finland)
24	Janne Kolehmainen	F	March 22, 1986	SaiPa (Finland)
25	Lauri Korpikoski	F	July 28, 1986	TPS (Finland)
26	Juuso Hietanen	D	June 14, 1985	HPK (Finland)
27	Lauri Tukonen	F	September 1, 1986	Espoo Blues (Finland)
28	Teemu Laakso	D	August 27, 1987	HIFK (Finland)
29	Jussi Makkonen	F	April 24, 1985	TuTo (Finland)
30	Tuukka Rask	G	March 10, 1987	Ilves (Finland)

== Germany ==
Coach: Ernst Hofner (Germany)

#	Name	Pos	DOB	Club
1	Thomas Greiss	G	January 29, 1986	Kölner Haie (Germany)
5	Raphael Kapzan	D	June 30, 1985	Landshut Cannibals (Germany)
8	Marco Schütz	D	February 19, 1985	Heilbronner Falken (Germany)
9	Danny Albrecht	D	January 17, 1985	REV Bremerhaven (Germany)
10	Felix Schütz	F	November 3, 1987	Landshut Cannibals (Germany)
11	Benedikt Shopper	D	February 18, 1985	Hannover Scorpions (Germany)
12	Moritz Müller	D	November 19, 1986	Kölner Haie (Germany)
13	Steffen Tolzer	D	June 12, 1985	Augsburger Panther (Germany)
14	Tobias Draxinger	D	January 3, 1985	Eisbären Berlin (Germany)
15	Ulrich Maurer	F		Nürnberg Ice Tigers (Germany)
16	Fabio Carciola	F		Adler Mannheim (Germany)
17	Marcus Kink	F		Adler Mannheim (Germany)
18	Kai Hospelt	F		Kölner Haie (Germany)
19	Alexander Jenzen	F		REV Bremerhaven (Germany)
20	Andre Reiss	F		REV Bremerhaven (Germany)
21	Markus Schmidt	F		REV Bremerhaven (Germany)
22	Robert Dietrich	D		ETC Crimmitschau (Germany)
23	Sachar Blank	F		Adler Mannheim (Germany)
24	Andre Rankel	F		Eisbären Berlin (Germany)
26	Florian Busch	F		Eisbären Berlin (Germany)
29	Jens Baxmann	D		Eisbären Berlin (Germany)
30	Youri Ziffer	G		Eisbären Berlin (Germany)

== Russia ==
Coach: Sergei Gersonsky (Russia)

#	Name	Pos	DOB	Club
1	Andrei Kuznetsov	G	April 25, 1985	Salavat Yulaev Ufa (Russia)
3	Anton Belov	D	July 29, 1986	CSKA Moscow (Russia)
5	Grigori Panin	D	November 24, 1985	Lada Togliatti (Russia)
6	Dimitri Vorobiev	D	October 18, 1986	Lada Togliatti (Russia)
7	Yakov Rylov	D	November 15, 1985	Dynamo Moscow (Russia)
8	Alexander Ovechkin	F	September 17, 1985	Dynamo Moscow (Russia)
11	Alexander Galimov	F	May 2, 1985	Lokomotiv Yaroslavl (Russia)
12	Dmitri Pestunov	F	January 22, 1985	Metallurg Magnitogorsk (Russia)
14	Dmitri Megalinski	D	April 15, 1985	Lokomotiv Yaroslavl (Russia)
15	Georgi Misharin	D	May 11, 1985	HC Neftekhimik Nizhnekamsk (Russia)
17	Evgeni Malkin	F	July 31, 1986	Metallurg Magnitogorsk (Russia)
19	Grigori Shafigulin	F	January 13, 1985	Lokomotiv Yaroslavl (Russia)
20	Alexei Emelin	D	April 25, 1986	Lada Togliatti (Russia)
21	Alexander Nikulin	F	August 25, 1985	CSKA Moscow (Russia)
22	Alexander Radulov	F	July 5, 1986	Quebec Remparts (Canada)
23	Mikhail Yunkov	F	February 16, 1986	Krylya Sovetov (Russia)
24	Denis Ezhov	D	February 28, 1985	CSKA Moscow (Russia)
25	Roman Voloshenko	F	May 12, 1986	Krylya Sovetov (Russia)
26	Enver Lisin	F	April 22, 1986	Ak Bars Kazan (Russia)
27	Denis Parshin	F	February 1, 1986	HC CSKA Moscow (Russia)
29	Sergei Shirokov	F	March 10, 1986	HC CSKA Moscow (Russia)
30	Anton Khudobin	G	May 7, 1986	Metallurg Magnitogorsk (Russia)

== Switzerland ==
Coach: Jakob Kolliker (Switzerland)

#	Name	Pos	DOB	Club
3	Gianni Ehrensperger	F	May 5, 1985	Kloten Flyers (Switzerland)
5	Daniel Schnyder	D	June 21, 1985	ZSC Lions (Switzerland)
7	Philippe Furrer	D	June 16, 1985	SC Bern (Switzerland)
9	Fabian Debrunner	F	March 19, 1985	ZSC Lions (Switzerland)
10	Patrick von Gunten	D	February 10, 1985	EHC Biel (Switzerland)
12	Yvan Benoît	F	April 9, 1985	Genève-Servette HC (Switzerland)
13	Stefan Hurlimann	F	March 13, 1985	SC Rapperswil-Jona (Switzerland)
14	Matthias Bieber	F	March 14, 1986	ZSC Lions (Switzerland)
16	Raphael Diaz	D	January 9, 1986	EV Zug (Switzerland)
18	Christian Haldimann	D	March 15, 1985	HC Fribourg-Gottéron (Switzerland)
20	Marco Kaser	F	March 26, 1985	SC Bern (Switzerland)
20	Michael Tobler	GK	August 5, 1985	SC Rapperswil-Jona (Switzerland)
21	Kevin Romy	F	January 31, 1985	Genève-Servette HC (Switzerland)
22	Victor Stancescu	F	March 10, 1985	Kloten Flyers (Switzerland)
23	Clarence Kparghai	D	May 13, 1985	SC Bern (Switzerland)
24	Alain Birbaum	D	October 11, 1985	HC Fribourg-Gottéron (Switzerland)
25	Beat Schuler	F	March 1, 1985	EV Zug (Switzerland)
26	Julien Sprunger	F	January 4, 1986	HC Fribourg-Gottéron (Switzerland)
27	Roman Wick	F	December 30, 1985	Red Deer Rebels (Canada)
28	Fabian Schnyder	F	December 30, 1985	EV Zug (Switzerland)
29	Julian Walker	F	September 10, 1986	SC Bern (Switzerland)
30	Leonardo Genoni	G	August 28, 1987	ZSC Lions (Switzerland)

== United States ==
Coach: Scott Sandelin (United States)

#	Name	Pos	DOB	Club
3	Chris Bourque	F	September 29, 1986	Boston University (United States)
5	Mike Brown	F	June 24, 1985	University of Michigan (United States)
7	Ryan Callahan	F	March 21, 1985	Guelph Storm (Canada)
9	Jake Dowell	F	March 4, 1985	University of Wisconsin (United States)
10	Dan Fritsche	F	July 13, 1985	Sarnia Sting (Canada)
12	T. J. Hensick	F	December 10, 1985	University of Michigan (United States)
13	Phil Kessel	F	October 2, 1987	U.S. National Team Development Program (United States)
14	Patrick O'Sullivan	F	February 1, 1985	Mississauga IceDogs (Canada)
16	Adam Pineault	F	May 23, 1986	Moncton Wildcats (Canada)
18	Kevin Porter	F	March 12, 1986	University of Michigan (United States)
20	Drew Stafford	F	October 30, 1985	University of North Dakota (United States)
20	Shawn Weller	F	July 8, 1986	Clarkson University (United States)
21	Casey Borer	D	July 28, 1985	St. Cloud State University (United States)
22	Alex Goligoski	D	July 30, 1985	University of Minnesota (United States)
23	Nate Hagemo	D	October 8, 1986	University of Minnesota (United States)
24	Matt Hunwick	D	May 21, 1985	University of Michigan (United States)
25	Brian Lee	D	March 26, 1987	Moorhead High School (United States)
26	Jeff Likens	D	August 28, 1985	University of Wisconsin (United States)
27	Ryan Suter	D	January 21, 1985	Milwaukee Admirals (United States)
28	Al Montoya	G	February 13, 1985	University of Michigan (United States)
29	Cory Schneider	G	March 18, 1986	Boston College (United States)
