= Carl Söderberg =

Swedish ice hockey player (born 1985)

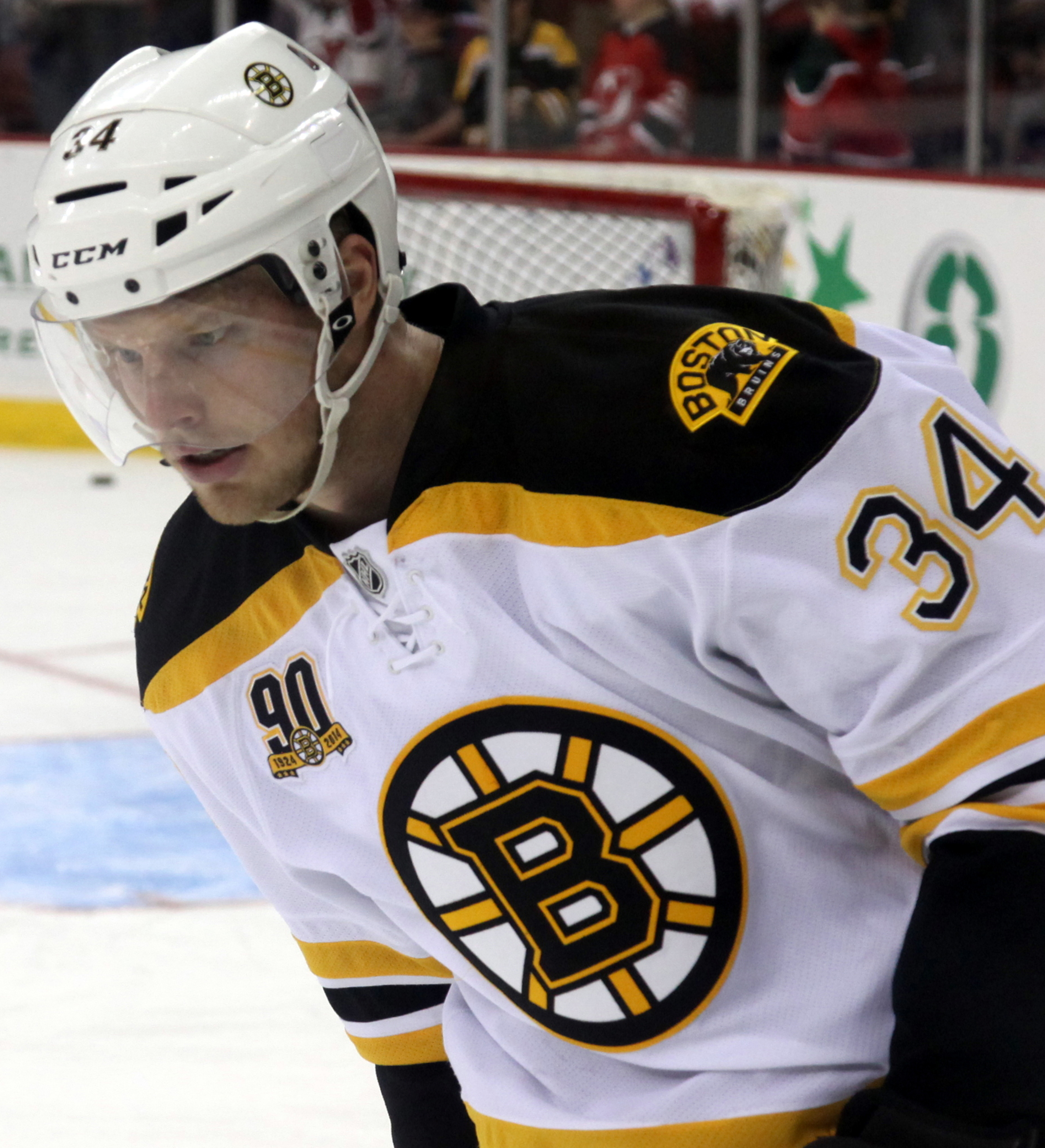
- Söderberg with the Boston Bruins in 2014
- Born: 12 October 1985 (age 41) Malmö, Sweden
- Height: 6 ft 3 in (191 cm)
- Weight: 209 lb (95 kg; 14 st 13 lb)
- Position: Centre
- Shot: Left
- Played for: Malmö Redhawks; Linköpings HC; Boston Bruins; Colorado Avalanche; Arizona Coyotes; Chicago Blackhawks
- National team: Sweden
- NHL draft: 49th overall, 2004; St. Louis Blues
- Playing career: 2003–2023

Carl Johan Söderberg (born 12 October 1985) is a Swedish former professional ice hockey forward. He was drafted by the St. Louis Blues in the second round, 49th overall, of the 2004 NHL entry draft, and has previously played with the Boston Bruins, Colorado Avalanche, Arizona Coyotes and Chicago Blackhawks in the National Hockey League (NHL).

== Playing career ==
=== Sweden ===
Söderberg played as a youth with hometown club, the Malmö Redhawks. While showing an offensive prowess in the Under-18 Allsvenskan he first played in the J20 SuperElit level with the Redhawks in the 2001–02 season, appearing in nine games. In the following season, he was a regular in the J20 placing second amongst the Redhawks in scoring with 35 points in 28 games.

In the 2003–04 season, Söderberg was dominant in the J20, helping Malmö to a silver medal finish by leading the league with 48 points in 27 games. During the season, he was elevated to make his professional debut in the Elitserien with the Malmö Redhawks, contributing with two points in 24 games. Soderberg showing size and skill was drafted in the second round, 49th overall in the 2004 NHL entry draft by the St. Louis Blues.

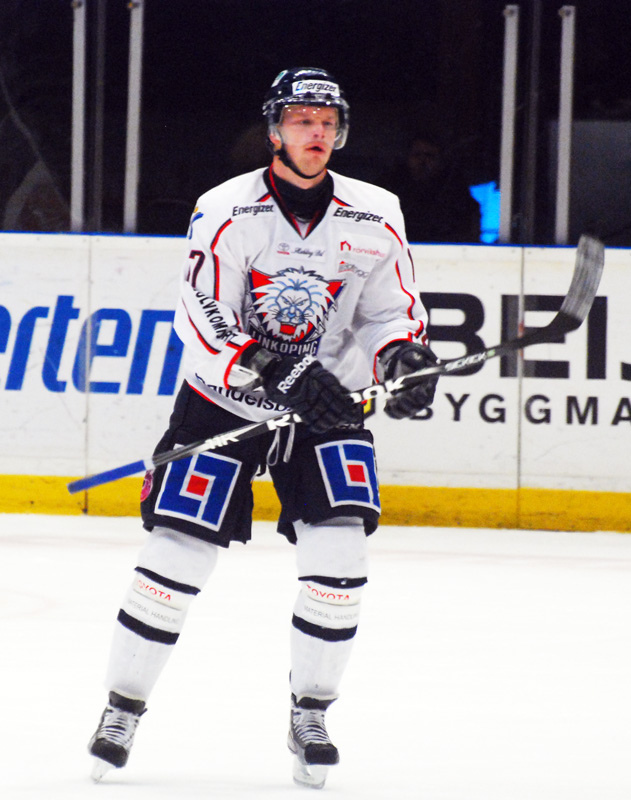
Söderberg with Linköping HC in November 2012.

Söderberg continued to play between the J20 and Elitserien in the 2004–05 season. While playing in limited minutes, Söderberg added 5 assists in 38 games in the SEL. During the year he accepted a loan spell to the HockeyAllsvenskan with Mörrums GoIS IK, contributing with 11 points in 14 games. Unable to help Malmö avoid relegation from the Elitserien at season's end, Söderberg became an impact player at the Allsvenskan level in the following 2005–06 season with the Redhawks, scoring at point-per-game pace with 39 points.

Upon helping Malmö return to the top division on the first time of asking, Söderberg was signed to a lucrative three-year entry-level contract with the St. Louis Blues on 1 June 2006. Söderberg moved to North America over the summer, and appeared in his first training camp with the Blues. Söderberg was to be assigned to the Blues American Hockey League affiliate, however struggling to adapt to his new country and dealing with homesickness, refused and was returned on loan to continue with Malmö in the SEL.

In the 2006–07 season, Söderberg was amongst the club's leading scorers in a break out season in the SEL with 30 points in 31 games before he sustained a serious injury in receiving a high-stick to his left eye, suffering a detached retina. The injury left Söderberg legally blind in his left eye. With the injury ruling him out for the remainder of the season and unable to practice in the off-season, Söderberg was traded by the Blues to the Boston Bruins in exchange for Hannu Toivonen on 23 July 2007.

With the intent to continue his recovery in Sweden with Malmö, Söderberg was loaned by the Bruins for the remainder of his entry-level contract. Learning to adapt to being left with 20–80 vision in his left eye, Söderberg compensated with greater use of other senses to seamlessly continue his scoring acumen in the HockeyAllsvenskan. At the conclusion of his NHL deal, and with the Bruins retaining his rights, Söderberg opted to remain loyal with his hometown club in Malmö, who were also threatened bankruptcy, for a further two seasons.

After 10 seasons within the Redhawks organization, with the club unable to earn promotion from the HockeyAllsvenskan, Söderberg in order to advance his career agreed to a one-year deal with Linköpings HC of the Elitserien on 1 April 2011. In the 2011–12 season, Söderberg made an instant impact with Linköpings with eight points in six games and was promptly given an improved three-year contract extension on 28 September 2011. He completed the season with 35 points in 42 games, placing second among forwards, unable to help the club propel into the post-season. Söderberg improved on his successful first season with Linköpings, leading the club in scoring with 60 points, and the league with 31 goals in 54 games. In the post-season, he was given a 7 match suspension, reduced to 4, for a hit on former NHL player Per Ledin on 14 March 2013. He was limited to 6 games in the post-season, ending his Elitserien career.

=== NHL ===
==== Boston Bruins ====
Upon Linköpings exit in the post-season, with the ambition to embark on an NHL career, Söderberg settled a protracted dispute with the Swedish Ice Hockey Association. He was released by Linköpings HC and was signed by the Boston Bruins to a three-year, one-way contract on 13 April 2013. After he was granted a visa, Söderberg joined the Bruins for the homestretch of the 2012–13 season. He made his NHL debut against the Pittsburgh Penguins on 20 April 2013. In only his second game with the Bruins, Söderberg assisted on the first goal (scored by Jaromír Jágr) of a 3–0 win over the Florida Panthers on 21 April, for his first NHL point.

He scored his first NHL goal later in the year, on 31 October, beating Jonas Hiller as the first Bruins goal of a 3–2 home shootout victory over the Anaheim Ducks.

==== Colorado Avalanche ====
On 25 June 2015, just prior to becoming an unrestricted free agent on 1 July, Söderberg was traded by the Bruins to the Colorado Avalanche in exchange for Boston's own sixth-round pick in the 2016 NHL entry draft previously traded to Colorado. The next day, on 26 June, he subsequently signed a five-year, $23.75 million contract with the Avalanche, which includes a full no-trade clause for the first two years and a limited no-trade afterward.

==== Arizona Coyotes ====
On 25 June 2019, with a year remaining on his contract, Söderberg was traded by the Avalanche to the Arizona Coyotes in exchange for Kevin Connauton and a 2020 third-round draft pick. In the 2019–20 season, Söderberg played in a top-nine forward role season with the Coyotes, notching 35 points in 70 regular season games. His 17 goals shared third among Coyotes' skaters. Söderberg helped the Coyotes qualify for the post-season recording a goal and an assist in nine games, before suffering a first-round series defeat to former club, the Colorado Avalanche.

==== Chicago Blackhawks ====
As a free agent from the Coyotes, Söderberg was signed approaching the delayed 2020–21 season on a one-year, $1 million contract with the Chicago Blackhawks on 26 December 2020.

==== Return to Colorado ====
At the trade deadline on 12 April 2021, Söderberg was traded by the Blackhawks back to the contending Colorado Avalanche in exchange for prospects Josh Dickinson and Ryder Rolston. Appearing in a bottom six role with the Avalanche, Söderberg collected 2 assists through the final 11 regular season games. Beginning the playoffs as a healthy scratch, Söderberg drew into the lineup in the third game of the opening round series against the St. Louis Blues registering an assist. Helping the Avalanche sweep the Blues, Söderberg later scored his first goal in his return to Colorado during the second round series game 3 loss to the Vegas Golden Knights on 4 June 2021. Unable to retain his role through the series, Söderberg finished as a healthy scratch in the 6 game defeat to the Golden Knights, ending with 2 points in 4 games.

=== Return to Sweden and retirement ===
As an impending free agent, Söderberg effectively opted to conclude his career in the NHL after nine seasons and 597 games, returning to his native Sweden and signing a two-year contract with his hometown club, the Malmö Redhawks of the SHL, on 17 June 2021.

After two seasons in Malmö, Soderberg announced his retirement on 1 August 2023.

== International play ==
Medal record

Representing Sweden

Ice hockey

World Championships
Gold medal – first place	2017 Germany/France	

Söderberg was first selected for the Swedish team at the International stage for the 2003 IIHF World U18 Championships in Russia. He contributed with 2 goals in 6 games before reaching the quarterfinals and suffering an 8–1 defeat against Canada, to finish in fifth place. When the 2005 World Junior Championships came to the United States, Soderberg was again selected to the Swedish squad. Sweden went out to the host nation in the quarterfinals with an 8–2 drubbing. Soderberg contributed offensively as the team's second-best scorer with six points in six games.

On 6 September 2008, Söderberg made his senior national team debut featuring in a friendly match against Finland. On 9 April 2013, Söderberg reached a multi-year agreement with the Boston Bruins and secured his release from his Swedish team, Linköpings HC. On 11 April 2013, however, the Swedish Ice Hockey Association (SIHF) blocked the release of Söderberg to the NHL in an attempt to secure his position on the Swedish national team for the upcoming 2013 IIHF World Championships being co-hosted by the country. In the following days, Söderberg refused to play for Sweden.

Söderberg finally made his return to the national team after he was selected to take part in the revamped 2016 World Cup of Hockey in Toronto, Ontario at the Air Canada Centre. He made his senior debut in the opening round robin game in a 2–1 victory over Russia on 18 September 2016. In four games he contributed with 1 assist before suffering a shock semi-final defeat to Team Europe.

== Career statistics ==
=== Regular season and playoffs ===
			Regular season					Playoffs
Season	Team	League	GP	G	A	Pts	PIM	GP	G	A	Pts	PIM
2000–01	MIF Redhawks	J18 Allsv	3	1	1	2	0	—	—	—	—	—
2001–02	MIF Redhawks	J18 Allsv	13	9	20	29	18	2	0	1	1	0
2001–02	MIF Redhawks	J20	4	0	2	2	2	5	0	1	1	4
2002–03	MIF Redhawks	J18 Allsv	4	6	3	9	25	—	—	—	—	—
2002–03	MIF Redhawks	J20	28	17	18	35	22	6	2	4	6	8
2003–04	MIF Redhawks	J20	27	23	25	48	30	6	1	2	3	10
2003–04	MIF Redhawks	SEL	24	1	1	2	8	—	—	—	—	—
2004–05	Malmö Redhawks	J20	12	13	6	19	43	3	2	1	3	12
2004–05	Malmö Redhawks	SEL	38	0	5	5	8	—	—	—	—	—
2004–05	Mörrums GoIS IK	Allsv	14	5	6	11	8	—	—	—	—	—
2005–06	Malmö Redhawks	Allsv	39	15	24	39	45	10	5	3	8	2
2006–07	Malmö Redhawks	SEL	31	12	18	30	14	—	—	—	—	—
2007–08	Malmö Redhawks	Allsv	32	15	29	44	16	10	7	7	14	2
2008–09	Malmö Redhawks	Allsv	45	18	41	59	26	—	—	—	—	—
2009–10	Malmö Redhawks	Allsv	51	20	31	51	53	5	0	1	1	0
2010–11	Malmö Redhawks	Allsv	52	12	34	46	18	—	—	—	—	—
2011–12	Linköpings HC	SEL	42	14	21	35	20	—	—	—	—	—
2012–13	Linköpings HC	SEL	54	31	29	60	48	6	1	1	2	27
2012–13	Boston Bruins	NHL	6	0	2	2	6	2	0	0	0	0
2013–14	Boston Bruins	NHL	73	16	32	48	36	12	1	5	6	2
2014–15	Boston Bruins	NHL	82	13	31	44	26	—	—	—	—	—
2015–16	Colorado Avalanche	NHL	82	12	39	51	32	—	—	—	—	—
2016–17	Colorado Avalanche	NHL	80	6	8	14	22	—	—	—	—	—
2017–18	Colorado Avalanche	NHL	77	16	21	37	26	6	0	2	2	2
2018–19	Colorado Avalanche	NHL	82	23	26	49	26	12	0	2	2	8
2019–20	Arizona Coyotes	NHL	70	17	18	35	18	9	1	1	2	2
2020–21	Chicago Blackhawks	NHL	34	7	8	15	14	—	—	—	—	—
2020–21	Colorado Avalanche	NHL	11	0	2	2	4	4	1	1	2	2
2021–22	Malmö Redhawks	SHL	52	22	19	41	47	—	—	—	—	—
2022–23	Malmö Redhawks	SHL	52	14	12	26	18	—	—	—	—	—
SHL totals			293	94	105	199	163	6	1	1	2	27
NHL totals			597	110	187	297	210	45	3	11	14	16

=== International ===
Year	Team	Event	Result	GP	G	A	Pts	PIM
2003	Sweden	WJC18	5th	6	2	0	2	4
2005	Sweden	WJC	6th	6	4	2	6	4
2016	Sweden	WCH	3rd	4	0	1	1	4
2017	Sweden	WC	1st place, gold medalist(s)	10	0	1	1	2
Junior totals				12	6	2	8	8
Senior totals				14	0	2	2	6
