= Anthony Stewart (ice hockey) =

Canadian ice hockey player

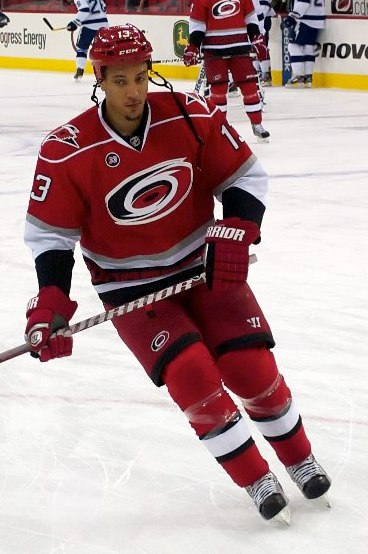
- Born: January 5, 1985 (age 41) LaSalle, Quebec, Canada
- Height: 6 ft 3 in (191 cm)
- Weight: 225 lb (102 kg; 16 st 1 lb)
- Position: Right wing
- Shot: Right
- Played for: Florida Panthers; Atlanta Thrashers; Nottingham Panthers; Carolina Hurricanes; Avtomobilist Yekaterinburg; HC Fribourg-Gottéron; Rapperswil-Jona Lakers; KHL Medveščak Zagreb
- NHL draft: 25th overall, 2003; Florida Panthers
- Playing career: 2005–2016

Anthony Stewart (born January 5, 1985) is a Canadian former professional ice hockey player, having played in the NHL, AHL, and KHL. He was born in Quebec, and his family moved to Toronto while he was a child. Stewart played minor hockey in Toronto, winning three all-Ontario championships. After his minor hockey career, he was selected by the Kingston Frontenacs in the first round of the Ontario Hockey League (OHL) draft. After two seasons with Kingston, he was drafted by the Florida Panthers in the first round of the 2003 NHL entry draft, at 25th overall. He spent four years in the Panthers' system, dividing his time between the NHL and the American Hockey League (AHL), after which he joined the Atlanta Thrashers for two years. When the Thrashers moved to Winnipeg to become the new Winnipeg Jets, they did not offer him a new contract, and he signed with the Carolina Hurricanes as a free agent. After one season in Carolina he was traded to the Kings, but spent most of the season in the minor leagues. He signed a professional tryout contract with the San Jose Sharks to begin the 2013–14 NHL season, but was not offered a contract. He subsequently signed with Avtomobilist Yekaterinburg in the KHL. His younger brother Chris also played in the NHL, and retired after the 2019–2020 season playing for Philadelphia Flyers.

Stewart has represented Canada internationally in two World Junior Championships, in the 2003 IIHF World U18 Championships, and twice in the ADT Canada-Russia Challenge. He was the leading goal scorer for Team Canada when they won the World U18 Championships. In the 2004 World Junior Ice Hockey Championships, in which Canada won a silver medal, Stewart tied for the tournament points lead. In the 2005 World Junior Ice Hockey Championships, he helped Team Canada win a gold medal. Representing the OHL at the Canada-Russia Challenge, Stewart helped his team go unbeaten in both tournaments (4–0), helping Canada to win the Challenge two years running.

== Early life ==
Stewart was born in LaSalle, Quebec, in 1985, the oldest of seven children of Norman and Sue Stewart. Norman immigrated to Canada from Jamaica in 1974, taking mainly seasonal jobs such as landscaping or construction, and Sue was a stay-at-home mother. The family moved to Toronto the year after Stewart's birth. During his childhood they were evicted from their home and moved to a subsidized shelter in what has been described as a "rough" neighbourhood of Scarborough. Stewart began skating at the age of four and playing hockey at five. As a young hockey player, he would often walk with his father to hockey games and practices. On one such occasion, the two were walking in a blizzard when they were picked up by a fellow hockey parent, Bob Ziemendorf, who was driving his child to the same place. Ziemendorf drove them home again after the practice, and from then on he regularly gave the family lifts and helped them with the cost of hockey and groceries. During a particularly trying time for the family, Stewart moved in with Ziemendorf and his family for over a year and a half. Stewart later stated that he believed that, without this help, he could not have got into the NHL.

== Playing career ==
=== Minor hockey and major junior ===
Stewart played minor hockey for the North York Canadians. He played so well that the cost of his hockey was subsidized personally by the head of the organization. With Stewart on the team, the North York Canadians won three all-Ontario championships. He played in the 1999 Quebec International Pee-Wee Hockey Tournament with North York. After finishing his minor hockey career, Stewart was selected by the Kingston Frontenacs in the first round of the OHL draft. In his first season in the OHL, he scored 19 goals and 43 points, and in the 2002–03 season he increased his tally to 38 goals and 70 points, then added seven more points in five playoff games. In the off-season, Stewart was named captain of the Frontenacs and was drafted in the first round of the NHL draft. Going into the 2003 NHL entry draft, he was rated as the 19th best prospect among North American skaters. With their second first round draft pick, the 25th overall, the Florida Panthers selected him. While the Frontenacs missed the playoffs the following season, Stewart scored a career high 35 goals. He attended the Panthers' training camp prior to the start of the 2004–05 OHL season. He performed impressively there but was sent back to Kingston to help his growth as a player. In his last OHL season, he led the Frontenacs' scoring with 67 points. After the Frontenacs failed to make the playoffs for the second consecutive year, Stewart made his professional debut, playing 10 games for the AHL team San Antonio Rampage, during which he scored a goal and two assists.

=== Professional ===
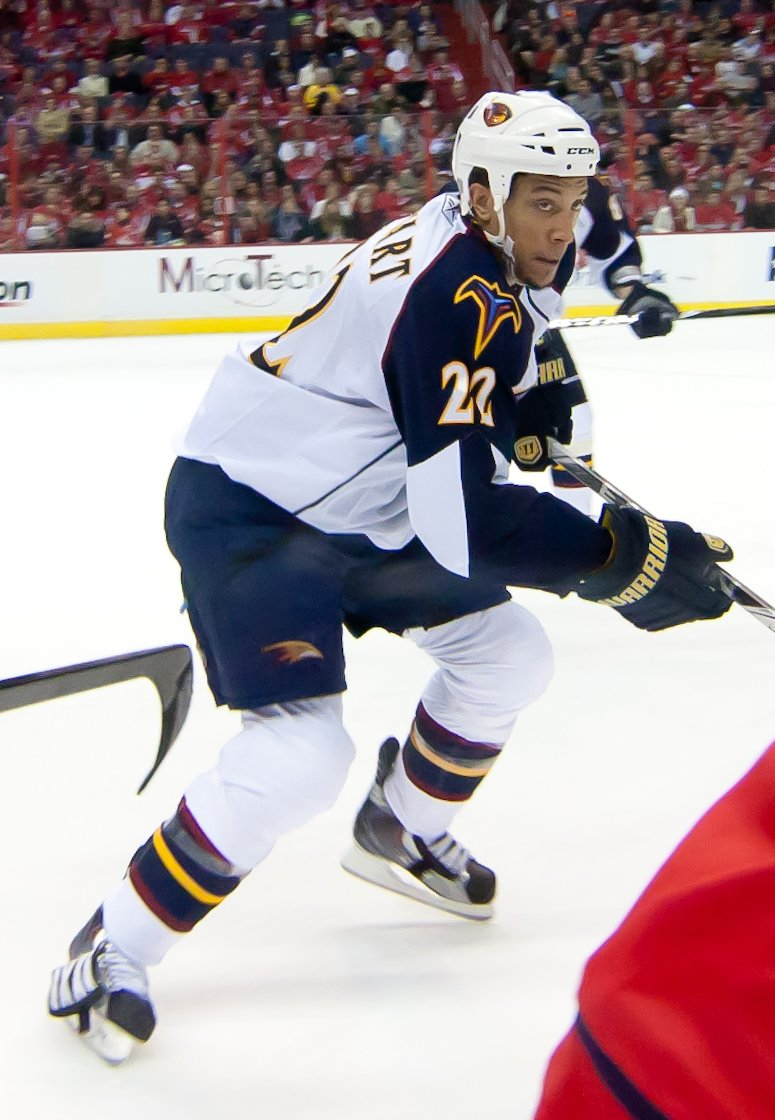
Stewart playing for the Thrashers in 2010

Stewart began the 2005–06 season in the AHL with the Rochester Americans. After four games he was called up by the Panthers, making his NHL debut on October 18, 2005, against New Jersey. During the game, he recorded his first NHL career point, an assist. Two days later he recorded the first NHL goal of his career, against Washington Capitals' goaltender Olaf Kolzig. He played ten games, scoring two goals and three points, before injuring his wrist when he crashed into the boards after a check by Carolina Hurricanes' defenceman Mike Commodore. The injury required surgery and ended Stewart's season. The following year was spent mainly in the AHL, playing in 62 games and registering 13 goals and 27 points. Stewart appeared in ten games with the Panthers, registering just one assist. In the 2007–08 season he spent more time in the NHL, playing in 26 games for Florida and again only registering one assist. While in the AHL, he played against his brother Chris, then a member of the Lake Erie Monsters. It was the first time they had faced each other in an organized hockey game. Anthony scored a goal and an assist in the game, and Rochester defeated Lake Erie 3–2. He finished the season with 31 points from 54 games. In the 2008–09 NHL season, for the first time in his career, Stewart played no games in the minor leagues. He played in 59 games for the Panthers, scoring 2 goals and 7 points.

In the off-season Stewart left the Panthers as a free agent and signed with the Atlanta Thrashers. After the 2009 pre-season he was assigned to the Thrashers' AHL affiliate, the Chicago Wolves. In his first year with them, he achieved AHL career highs in games played (77) and assists (19), and equalled his career high in points (31). Stewart played the entire 2010–11 season with the Thrashers, scoring his first career hat-trick in a game against the Anaheim Ducks. His third goal tied the game 4–4, and the Thrashers went on to win the game in a shootout. In that season Stewart set both NHL career highs and professional career highs in games played and in every major offensive statistical category.

When the Thrashers moved to Winnipeg, the Winnipeg Jets opted not to submit a qualifying offer for Stewart, making him an unrestricted free agent. He signed a two-year, US$1.8 million contract with the Carolina Hurricanes on July 2, 2011. After the first 50 games with the Hurricanes Stewart recorded 6 goals and 13 points, while playing mostly on the fourth line. Despite leading the team with a +4 rating Carolina placed him on waivers. He cleared waivers the following day and remained with the team. He finished the year with 9 goals and 20 points in 77 games, while his plus-minus rating fell to -2.

Prior to the start of the 2012–13 season the NHL enforced a lockout. Three weeks into the labor dispute Stewart signed with the Nottingham Panthers of the Elite Ice Hockey League in the United Kingdom. Stewart stated that he signed with the team as a way of staying in game shape. He played 19 games for Nottingham recording 11 points. Upon the conclusion of the lockout Carolina traded Stewart to the Los Angeles Kings, along with two draft picks in exchange for Kevin Westgarth. Los Angeles did not play Stewart in their opening game and placed him on waivers prior to their next game. Stewart cleared waivers and was assigned to the Kings minor league affiliate the Manchester Monarchs. The move allowed the Kings to activate Anze Kopitar off of their non-roster list.

In the 2013–14 season, Stewart initially signed a one-year contract with Russian club, Avtomobilist Yekaterinburg of the KHL. In failing to establish himself within Avtomobilist, scoring just 1 goals in 19 games, Stewart was mutually released from his contract to join Swiss club, HC Fribourg-Gottéron of the National League A, on a monthly basis contract on December 16, 2013. Stewart contributed with 8 points in 12 games, before he continued his unsettled season, joining his third club and NLA strugglers, Rapperswil-Jona Lakers in a brief stint to end the year.

On August 4, 2014, Stewart returned for another attempt in the KHL, signing a trial contract as a free agent with Croatian club, KHL Medveščak Zagreb. He was released from his try-out after 12 games with the club on October 14, 2014.

== International play ==
Medal record

Representing Canada

World Junior Championships
Gold medal – first place	2005 Grand Forks	
Silver medal – second place	2004 Helsinki	

World Junior U18 Championships
Gold medal – first place	2003 Yaroslavl	

Eight Nations Cup
Gold medal – first place	2002 Slovakia	

Representing Ontario

World U-17 Hockey Challenge
Bronze medal – third place	2002 Manitoba	

Stewart first played internationally at the 2002 World U-17 Hockey Challenge representing Ontario. The tournament is a non-International Ice Hockey Federation (IIHF) sanctioned event in which Canada is represented by five teams (Pacific, Western, Ontario, Quebec and Atlantic). In the tournament Team Ontario won a bronze medal, defeating team Quebec 5–2 in the medal round. During 2002 he also made his first appearance for Team Canada playing in the non-IIHF sanctioned Eight Nations Cup, helping the team win a gold medal.

Stewart made his IIHF international debut playing for Canada in the 2003 IIHF World U18 Championships in Yaroslavl, Russia. During the tournament he scored six goals, tying for fourth place in tournament scoring. His scoring success ranked him as the top goal-scoring Canadian; however, he contributed no assists, and finished third on the team in points. The Canadian team finished the preliminary round with a 2–2–1 record. In the elimination round they defeated the Slovak team 3–0 to win the gold medal. At the end of the tournament Stewart was named to the All-Star team. Later that year Stewart represented the OHL in the 2003 ADT Canada-Russia Challenge. He scored one goal, helping the OHL win both their games, which contributed to a 5–1 series win for the Canadian Hockey League (CHL).

The following year Stewart was selected to play for Canada in the 2004 World Junior Ice Hockey Championships in Helsinki and Hämeenlinna, Finland. Canada went unbeaten in the preliminary round and advanced to the final of the elimination round, where they faced the United States team. During the second period of the final, Stewart scored a goal to put Canada ahead 3–1. It was his third point of the game, as he had made assists in the two previous goals. However, Canada conceded three goals in the third period, losing 4–3 and receiving the silver medal. Stewart finished the tournament with 11 points, tying teammate Nigel Dawes and US player Zach Parise for the tournament lead in points scored. Having scored one more goal than Stewart and Parise, Dawes was officially named the tournament's leading scorer. Later in the year Stewart was selected to play in the 2004 ADT Canada-Russia Challenge as part of the OHL All-Stars team, and later he was named an alternate captain. He scored a short handed goal in the OHL's second game of the series, a 5–2 win. The OHL won both of its games in the series, helping the CHL to a 4–2 win in the series.

In 2005 Stewart was again selected to play for Canada in the World Junior Championships in Grand Forks, North Dakota. Unlike in previous years, Stewart struggled at this tournament, and in the second game he was relegated to 13th forward. An injury to teammate Jeremy Colliton allowed Stewart to play in the following game, in which he scored two goals, contributing to a 9–0 defeat of the German team. Once more, Canada had an undefeated run to the final, where they faced Russia. In the final Stewart scored the fifth goal in a 6–1 win for Canada, earning him his third international gold medal.

== Career statistics ==
=== Regular season and playoffs ===
			Regular season					Playoffs
Season	Team	League	GP	G	A	Pts	PIM	GP	G	A	Pts	PIM
2000–01	North York Canadiens 15U AAA	GTHL	34	30	70	100	—	—	—	—	—	—
2000–01	St. Michael's Buzzers	OPJHL	5	0	2	2	0	—	—	—	—	—
2001–02	Kingston Frontenacs	OHL	65	19	24	43	12	1	0	0	0	0
2002–03	Kingston Frontenacs	OHL	68	32	38	70	47	—	—	—	—	—
2003–04	Kingston Frontenacs	OHL	53	35	23	58	76	5	3	4	7	7
2004–05	Kingston Frontenacs	OHL	62	32	35	67	70	—	—	—	—	—
2004–05	San Antonio Rampage	AHL	10	1	2	3	14	—	—	—	—	—
2005–06	Rochester Americans	AHL	4	2	3	5	0	—	—	—	—	—
2005–06	Florida Panthers	NHL	10	2	1	3	2	—	—	—	—	—
2006–07	Rochester Americans	AHL	62	13	14	27	64	6	2	0	2	2
2006–07	Florida Panthers	NHL	10	0	1	1	2	—	—	—	—	—
2007–08	Rochester Americans	AHL	54	13	18	31	61	—	—	—	—	—
2007–08	Florida Panthers	NHL	26	0	1	1	0	—	—	—	—	—
2008–09	Florida Panthers	NHL	59	2	5	7	34	—	—	—	—	—
2009–10	Chicago Wolves	AHL	77	13	18	31	67	13	9	3	12	6
2010–11	Atlanta Thrashers	NHL	80	14	25	39	55	—	—	—	—	—
2011–12	Carolina Hurricanes	NHL	77	9	11	20	30	—	—	—	—	—
2012–13	Nottingham Panthers	EIHL	19	6	5	11	14	—	—	—	—	—
2012–13	Manchester Monarchs	AHL	30	4	3	7	31	4	1	0	1	0
2013–14	Avtomobilist Yekaterinburg	KHL	19	1	1	2	6	—	—	—	—	—
2013–14	HC Fribourg–Gottéron	NLA	12	3	5	8	20	—	—	—	—	—
2013–14	Rapperswil–Jona Lakers	NLA	2	0	1	1	0	—	—	—	—	—
2014–15	KHL Medveščak Zagreb	KHL	12	1	1	2	6	—	—	—	—	—
2015–16	Jonquière Marquis	LNAH	12	3	8	11	16	11	9	1	10	8
AHL totals			234	45	59	104	237	23	12	3	15	8
NHL totals			262	27	44	71	123	—	—	—	—	—

=== International ===
Year	Team	Event	Result	GP	G	A	Pts	PIM
2002	Canada Ontario	U17	3rd place, bronze medalist(s)	6	5	1	6	0
2003	Canada	WJC18	1st place, gold medalist(s)	7	6	0	6	6
2004	Canada	WJC	2nd place, silver medalist(s)	6	5	6	11	2
2005	Canada	WJC	1st place, gold medalist(s)	6	3	1	4	0
Junior totals				25	19	8	27	8

== Media ==
From 2018-2023, Stewart was employed as an on-air analyst by Sportsnet in Canada.

== See also ==
- List of black NHL players
- List of family relations in the NHL

Awards and achievements
Preceded by Nathan Horton	Florida Panthers first-round draft pick 2003	Succeeded by Rostislav Olesz
