= Michal Borovanský =

Czech ice hockey player

- Born: March 15, 1985 (age 41) Prague, Czechoslovakia
- Height: 5 ft 11 in (180 cm)
- Weight: 176 lb (80 kg; 12 st 8 lb)
- Position: Right wing
- Shoots: Right
- team Former teams: Free agent HC Karlovy Vary; HC Slavia Praha; TKH Toruń
- Playing career: 2005–present

Michal Borovanský (born March 15, 1985) is a Czech professional ice hockey right winger.

Borovanský played 36 games in the Czech Extraliga for HC Karlovy Vary and HC Slavia Praha. He also played thirteen games for TKH Toruń in the Polska Liga Hokejowa.

Borovanský played for the Czech Republic in the 2005 World Junior Ice Hockey Championships.
