= Johannes Salmonsson =

Swedish ice hockey player

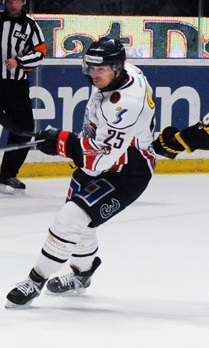
- Born: February 7, 1986 (age 40) Uppsala, Sweden
- Height: 6 ft 2 in (188 cm)
- Weight: 207 lb (94 kg; 14 st 11 lb)
- Position: Winger
- Shoots: Left
- Allsv team Former teams: IK Oskarshamn; Djurgårdens IF; Brynäs IF; Rögle BK; HC Davos; EHC Biel; AIK IF; Linköpings HC; Kölner Haie; Iserlohn Roosters; Timrå IK
- NHL draft: 31st overall, 2004; Pittsburgh Penguins
- Playing career: 2002–present

Johannes Salmonsson (born February 7, 1986) is a Swedish professional ice hockey player who is currently playing for IK Oskarshamn of the HockeyAllsvenskan (Allsv). Salmonsson was drafted by the Pittsburgh Penguins organization in the 2nd round (31st overall) of the 2004 NHL entry draft. His youth team was Almtuna IS.

== Playing career ==
Salmonsson began his professional career during the 2002 Allsvenskan playoffs with Almtuna. He made his Elitserien debut during the 2003–04 season with Djurgårdens IF of the Swedish Elitserien. He then moved to North America after two seasons with Djurgården to play one season with the Spokane Chiefs of the Western Hockey League during the 2005–06 season. The following year, Salmonsson went back to Sweden, signing as a free agent, to play for Brynäs. During his second season with Brynäs he moved to Rögle of the second-tier league HockeyAllsvenskan.

After three seasons with Linköpings HC on July 17, 2015, Salmonsson left Sweden as a free agent and signed his first contract in Germany with Kölner Haie of the Deutsche Eishockey Liga (DEL) on a one-year agreement. Salmonsson played two seasons with the Sharks before signing with second DEL club, the Iserlohn Roosters.

Following three seasons in the DEL, Salmonsson opted to return to his native Sweden, agreeing to terms after a successful tryout with top flight SHL club, Timrå IK, on November 8, 2018.

== International play ==
Salmonsson has played for the Swedish national junior team at the World Junior Ice Hockey Championships on three occasions: 2003–04, 2004–05, and 2005–06. At those tournaments Salmonsson played in 17 games and scored 13 points (7 goals, 3 assists).

== Career statistics ==
=== Regular season and playoffs ===
			Regular season					Playoffs
Season	Team	League	GP	G	A	Pts	PIM	GP	G	A	Pts	PIM
2002–03	Almtuna IS	J18		1	1	2	0	—	—	—	—	—
2002–03	Almtuna IS	SWE.3	26	10	14	24	4	8	2	4	6	16
2003–04	Djurgårdens IF	J20	6	4	9	13	6	—	—	—	—	—
2003–04	Djurgårdens IF	SEL	25	0	3	3	4	—	—	—	—	—
2003–04	Almtuna IS	Allsv	2	0	0	0	0	—	—	—	—	—
2004–05	Djurgårdens IF	J20	4	2	0	2	4	—	—	—	—	—
2004–05	Djurgårdens IF	SEL	30	2	2	4	6	9	0	0	0	0
2004–05	Almtuna IS	Allsv	8	0	2	2	6	—	—	—	—	—
2005–06	Spokane Chiefs	WHL	54	12	15	27	30	—	—	—	—	—
2006–07	Brynäs IF	J20	2	0	7	7	0	—	—	—	—	—
2006–07	Brynäs IF	SEL	45	8	3	11	28	—	—	—	—	—
2007–08	Brynäs IF	J20	2	0	2	2	2	—	—	—	—	—
2007–08	Brynäs	SEL	9	0	1	1	2	—	—	—	—	—
2007–08	Rögle BK	Allsv	24	10	4	14	26	10	5	5	10	10
2008–09	Rögle BK	SEL	33	5	4	9	12	—	—	—	—	—
2009–10	HC Davos	NLA	23	5	6	11	44	1	0	0	0	0
2009–10	EHC Biel	NLA	6	2	3	5	0	—	—	—	—	—
2010–11	AIK	SEL	52	9	11	20	28	6	1	3	4	6
2011–12	AIK	SEL	41	5	13	18	16	11	3	7	10	0
2012–13	Linköpings HC	SEL	53	10	11	21	16	10	2	4	6	6
2013–14	Linköpings HC	SHL	54	7	13	20	34	14	3	4	7	10
2014–15	Linköpings HC	SHL	46	5	4	9	28	11	1	1	2	4
2015–16	Kölner Haie	DEL	45	8	11	19	12	14	2	8	10	2
2016–17	Kölner Haie	DEL	45	5	8	13	14	5	0	0	0	0
2017–18	Iserlohn Roosters	DEL	52	5	7	12	10	2	0	0	0	0
2018–19	Timrå IK	SHL	33	4	15	19	14	—	—	—	—	—
2019–20	IK Oskarshamn	SHL	50	13	11	24	26	—	—	—	—	—
2020–21	IK Oskarshamn	SHL	27	4	7	11	10	—	—	—	—	—
2021–22	IK Oskarshamn	SHL	34	2	0	2	8	10	1	2	3	2
2022–23	IK Oskarshamn	SHL	47	4	4	8	18	—	—	—	—	—
2023–24	IK Oskarshamn	SHL	36	2	3	5	10	—	—	—	—	—
SHL totals			615	80	105	185	260	71	11	21	32	28

=== International ===
Year	Team	Event	Result	GP	G	A	Pts	PIM
2004	Sweden	WJC	7th	6	0	1	1	4
2005	Sweden	WJC	6th	6	5	3	8	0
2006	Sweden	WJC	5th	5	2	2	4	2
Junior totals				17	7	6	13	6
