= Clarence Kparghai =

Liberian-born Swiss ice hockey player

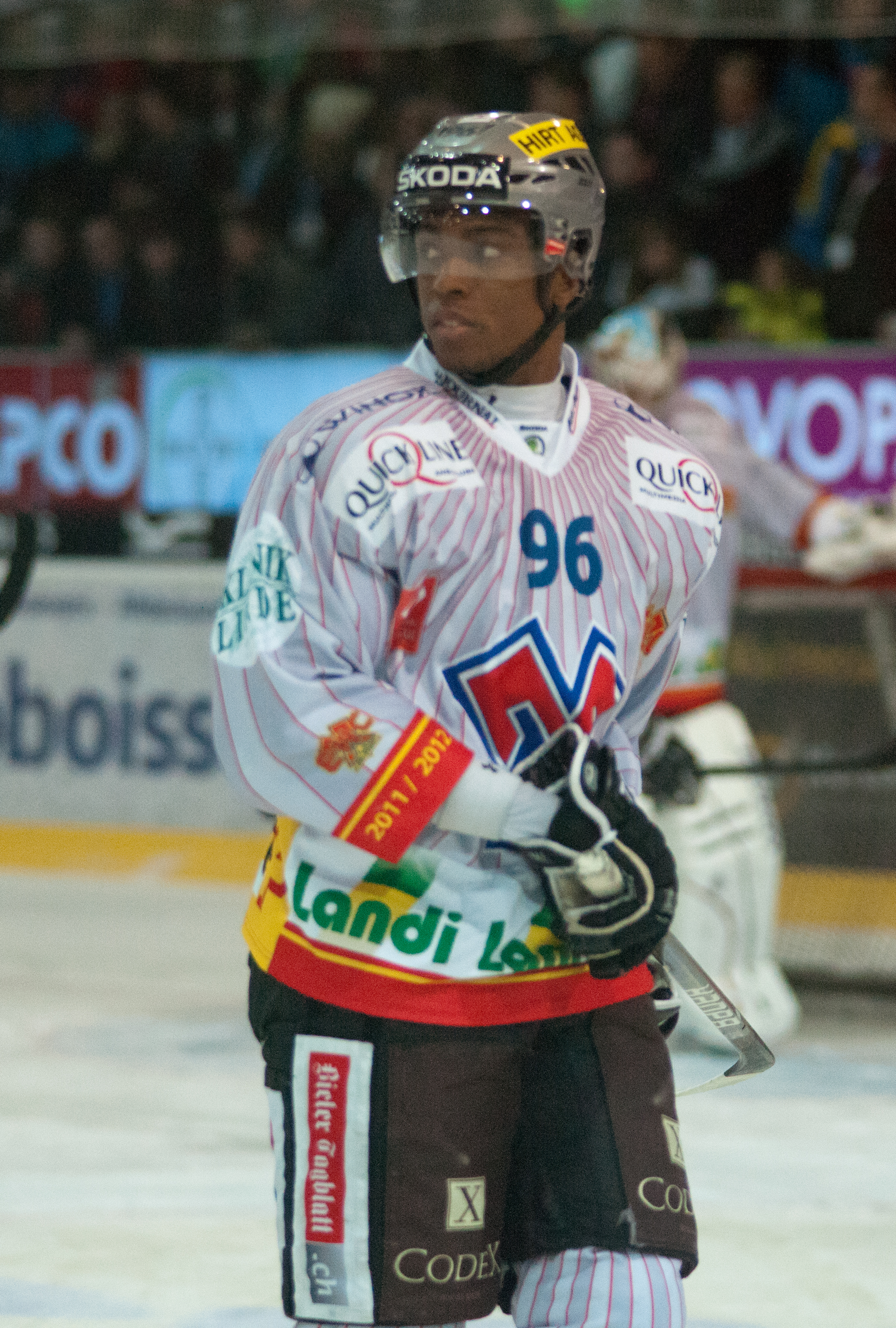
- Born: 13 May 1985 (age 41) Monrovia, Liberia
- Height: 6 ft 0 in (183 cm)
- Weight: 183 lb (83 kg; 13 st 1 lb)
- Shoots: Left
- NL team Former teams: Free Agent; HC Davos; EHC Biel; HC Lugano; EHC Kloten
- Playing career: 2004–present

Clarence Kparghai (born 13 May 1985 in Monrovia, Liberia) is a Liberian-born Swiss professional ice hockey defenceman who is currently an unrestricted free agent. He was most recently contracted with HC Lugano in the National League (NL). He has previously played for SC Langenthal, EHC Chur, HC Thurgau, EHC Olten, HC Davos and EHC Biel.

== Playing career ==
Kparghai made his professional debut with SC Langenthal in the Swiss League (SL) during the 2004-05 SL season. He then made his National League (NL) debut during the 2005-06 NL season with HC Davos, playing 24 games that season.

Kparghai officially joined EHC Biel for the 2008-09 NL season and eventually played five years with the team, establishing himself as a National League player.

On 26 November 2012, Kparghai agreed to a three-year contract with HC Lugano for the 2013-14 NL season.

During the 2012–13 season, Kparghai was fined CHF 1,000 for biting SC Bern's John Tavares on 22 December 2012.

On 5 November 2015, Kparghai was signed to a three-year contract extension by Lugano. During the 2016 NL final against SC Bern, Kparghai tore his ACL, ending his season. He underwent surgery in the following days and once again in September because of complications, forcing him to sit out the entire 2016-17 NL season. He was able to resume hockey activities in July 2017.

== Career statistics ==
=== Regular season and playoffs ===
			Regular season					Playoffs
Season	Team	League	GP	G	A	Pts	PIM	GP	G	A	Pts	PIM
2004–05	SC Langenthal	NLB	24	0	1	1	2	—	—	—	—	—
2005–06	HC Davos	NLA	24	0	0	0	8	—	—	—	—	—
2005–06	EHC Chur	NLB	18	2	4	6	32	—	—	—	—	—
2006–07	HC Davos	NLA	2	0	0	0	2	—	—	—	—	—
2006–07	HC Thurgau	NLB	30	3	11	14	32	—	—	—	—	—
2006–07	EHC Biel	NLB	2	0	1	1	0	16	0	1	1	12
2007–08	EHC Olten	NLB	39	9	9	18	42	—	—	—	—	—
2007–08	EHC Biel	NLB	—	—	—	—	—	5	0	0	0	4
2008–09	EHC Biel	NLA	50	0	1	1	28	—	—	—	—	—
2009–10	EHC Biel	NLA	41	0	3	3	14	—	—	—	—	—
2010–11	EHC Biel	NLA	43	1	6	7	26	—	—	—	—	—
2011–12	EHC Biel	NLA	49	7	6	13	22	3	0	0	0	6
2012–13	EHC Biel	NLA	37	0	6	6	16	1	0	0	0	0
2013–14	HC Lugano	NLA	39	2	5	7	14	5	0	0	0	6
2014–15	HC Lugano	NLA	34	1	1	2	24	6	0	1	1	0
2015–16	HC Lugano	NLA	50	2	5	7	16	14	0	0	0	2
2017–18	HC Lugano	NL	20	1	4	5	2	—	—	—	—	—
2017–18	HCB Ticino Rockets	SL	17	0	2	2	16	—	—	—	—	—
2017–18	EHC Kloten	NL	7	0	1	1	2	—	—	—	—	—
2018–19	HCB Ticino Rockets	SL	23	3	4	7	24	—	—	—	—	—
2018–19	HC Davos	NL	5	1	0	1	2	—	—	—	—	—
2018–19	EHC Olten	SL	—	—	—	—	—	9	1	0	1	10
NL totals			401	15	38	53	176	29	0	1	1	14

=== International ===
Year	Team	Event	Result	GP	G	A	Pts	PIM
2005	Switzerland	WJC	8th	6	0	1	1	10
Junior totals				6	0	1	1	10
