= Elias Granath =

Swedish ice hockey player (born 1985)

- Born: September 6, 1985 (age 41) Borlänge, Sweden
- Height: 6 ft 1 in (185 cm)
- Weight: 189 lb (86 kg; 13 st 7 lb)
- Position: Defence
- Shot: Left
- team Former teams: Free Agent; Leksands IF; Timrå IK; Schwenninger Wild Wings
- NHL draft: 196th overall, 2003; Dallas Stars
- Playing career: 2003–2017

Elias Granath (born September 6, 1985, in Borlänge, Sweden) is a professional Swedish ice hockey defenceman currently an unrestricted free agent. He played two seasons for Schwenninger Wild Wings of the Deutsche Eishockey Liga (DEL). On December 12, 2015 he signed at new contract with Herning Bluefox of the Danish Metalligaen for the rest of the 2015-2016 season. He has previously captained Timrå IK in the Swedish Elitserien.

== Career statistics ==
=== Regular season and playoffs ===
			Regular season					Playoffs
Season	Team	League	GP	G	A	Pts	PIM	GP	G	A	Pts	PIM
2001–02	Leksands IF	J18 Allsv	11	0	1	1	8	4	0	0	0	2
2001–02	Leksands IF	J20	6	0	0	0	0	1	0	0	0	0
2002–03	Leksands IF	J20	29	0	4	4	49	—	—	—	—	—
2002–03	Borlänge HF	SWE.3	2	0	0	0	0	—	—	—	—	—
2002–03	Leksands IF	J18 Allsv	—	—	—	—	—	2	0	1	1	8
2003–04	Leksands IF	J20	25	4	4	8	34	—	—	—	—	—
2003–04	Leksands IF	SEL	38	0	0	0	4	—	—	—	—	—
2004–05	Leksands IF	J20	5	0	2	2	8	5	1	0	1	2
2004–05	Leksands IF	Allsv	33	3	3	6	24	2	0	0	0	0
2005–06	Leksands IF	J20	3	1	1	2	2	—	—	—	—	—
2005–06	Leksands IF	SEL	46	0	0	0	55	—	—	—	—	—
2006–07	Leksands IF	Allsv	45	1	8	9	42	9	0	1	1	6
2007–08	Leksands IF	Allsv	44	2	6	8	46	10	0	0	0	6
2008–09	Leksands IF	Allsv	44	5	8	13	50	10	0	0	0	27
2009–10	Timrå IK	SEL	53	4	7	11	42	5	1	0	1	2
2010–11	Timrå IK	SEL	42	1	7	8	32	—	—	—	—	—
2011–12	Timrå IK	SEL	44	2	6	8	36	—	—	—	—	—
2012–13	Djurgårdens IF	Allsv	41	4	4	8	28	6	0	2	2	2
2013–14	Schwenninger Wild Wings	DEL	33	4	5	9	54	—	—	—	—	—
2014–15	Schwenninger Wild Wings	DEL	49	2	3	5	46	—	—	—	—	—
2015–16	Herning Blue Fox	DEN	19	0	11	11	29	18	1	3	4	22
2016–17	SønderjyskE	DEN	26	1	2	3	34	6	0	1	1	6
SEL totals			223	7	20	27	169	5	1	0	1	2
Allsv totals			207	15	29	44	190	37	0	3	3	41

=== International ===
Year	Team	Event	GP	G	A	Pts	PIM
2003	Sweden	WJC18	6	1	0	1	0
2005	Sweden	WJC	6	1	2	3	6
Junior totals			12	2	2	4	6
