= Alexei Savin =

Russian-born Belarusian ice hockey player

- Born: 15 May 1986 Chelyabinsk, Chelyabinsk Oblast, Russian SFSR, Soviet Union
- Died: 18 June 2007 (aged 21) Chelyabinsk, Chelyabinsk Oblast, Russia
- Height: 6 ft 0 in (183 cm)
- Weight: 196 lb (89 kg; 14 st 0 lb)
- Position: Forward
- Shot: Left
- Played for: Yunost Minsk
- National team: Belarus
- Playing career: 2005–2007

Alexei Anatolyevich Savin (Russian: Алексей Анатольевич Савин; 15 May 1986 – 18 June 2007) was a Belarusian professional forward ice hockey player.

A naturalised Belarusian, Savin played for Yunost Minsk and was one of the most promising young player of the country. He played in the 2005 and 2006 World Championships, as well as in the World Junior Ice Hockey Championships in 2005 and 2006.

Savin was killed in a road accident on 18 June 2007 in Chelyabinsk, Russia when his bicycle was run down by a car, at age 21.
