= Dmitry Vorobyov =

Russian ice hockey player (born 1985)

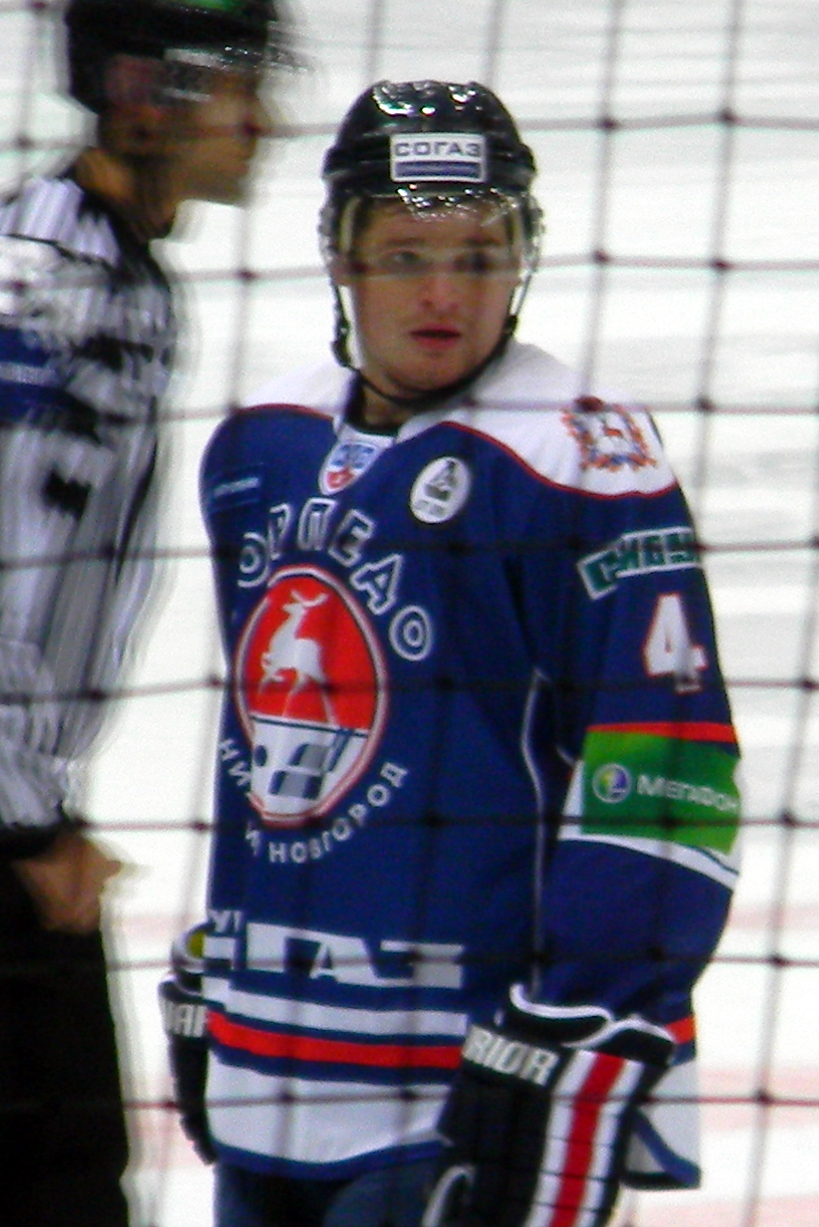
- Born: October 18, 1985 (age 40) Tolyatti, Soviet Union
- Height: 1.88 m (6 ft 2 in)
- Weight: 108 kg (238 lb; 17 st 0 lb)
- Position: Defence
- Shot: Left
- Tipsport Liga team Former teams: HK Dukla Michalovce; Lada Togliatti; Salavat Yulaev Ufa; Dynamo Moscow; SKA Saint Petersburg; Torpedo Nizhny Novgorod; Avangard Omsk; Admiral Vladivostok; Amur Khabarovsk
- National team: Russia
- NHL draft: 157th overall, 2004; Toronto Maple Leafs
- Playing career: 2003–2020

Dmitry Sergeyevich Vorobyov (Russian: Дмитрий Сергеевич Воробьёв; born October 18, 1985, in Tolyatti) is a Russian professional ice hockey player currently playing for HK Dukla Michalovce of the Tipsport Liga. He previously played in the Kontinental Hockey League for Lada Togliatti, Salavat Yulaev Ufa, Dynamo Moscow, SKA Saint Petersburg, Torpedo Nizhny Novgorod, Avangard Omsk, Admiral Vladivostok and Amur Khabarovsk.

== Playing career ==
As a young defensive prospect he had been a member of Russia's U18 and U20 national squads and has also skated on several occasions, including at the 2008 World Championships in Canada. The young defenceman was drafted by the Toronto Maple Leafs with the 157th overall selection in the 2004 NHL entry draft. He has since become one of the top blue liners in the Russian Super League and on Russia's national team.

== Career statistics ==
=== Regular season and playoffs ===
| | | | Regular season | | | | | Playoffs |
| Season | Team | League | GP | G | A | Pts | PIM | GP | G | A | Pts | PIM |
|---|---|---|---|---|---|---|---|---|---|---|---|---|
| 2001–02 | Lada–2 Togliatti | RUS.3 | 63 | 3 | 7 | 10 | 38 | — | — | — | — | — |
| 2002–03 | Lada–2 Togliatti | RUS.3 | 31 | 2 | 3 | 5 | 12 | — | — | — | — | — |
| 2003–04 | Lada Togliatti | RSL | 23 | 1 | 0 | 1 | 12 | 4 | 0 | 0 | 0 | 4 |
| 2003–04 | Lada–2 Togliatti | RUS.3 | 11 | 1 | 1 | 2 | 2 | 4 | 1 | 1 | 2 | 4 |
| 2004–05 | Lada Togliatti | RSL | 53 | 2 | 6 | 8 | 30 | 10 | 0 | 0 | 0 | 8 |
| 2004–05 | Lada–2 Togliatti | RUS.3 | 1 | 0 | 0 | 0 | 0 | — | — | — | — | — |
| 2005–06 | Lada Togliatti | RSL | 42 | 1 | 7 | 8 | 73 | 8 | 0 | 0 | 0 | 8 |
| 2005–06 | Lada–2 Togliatti | RUS.3 | 1 | 0 | 0 | 0 | 2 | — | — | — | — | — |
| 2006–07 | Lada Togliatti | RSL | 54 | 10 | 7 | 17 | 48 | 3 | 0 | 0 | 0 | 6 |
| 2007–08 | Lada Togliatti | RSL | 55 | 16 | 12 | 28 | 74 | 4 | 3 | 0 | 3 | 2 |
| 2008–09 | Lada Togliatti | KHL | 39 | 4 | 14 | 18 | 18 | — | — | — | — | — |
| 2008–09 | Salavat Yulaev Ufa | KHL | 5 | 0 | 0 | 0 | 0 | — | — | — | — | — |
| 2009–10 | Dynamo Moscow | KHL | 50 | 2 | 7 | 9 | 12 | 4 | 0 | 2 | 2 | 8 |
| 2010–11 | SKA St. Petersburg | KHL | 23 | 2 | 3 | 5 | 4 | — | — | — | — | — |
| 2010–11 | VMF St. Petersburg | VHL | 2 | 0 | 0 | 0 | 0 | — | — | — | — | — |
| 2011–12 | Torpedo Nizhny Novgorod | KHL | 39 | 2 | 11 | 13 | 16 | — | — | — | — | — |
| 2011–12 | SKA St. Petersburg | KHL | 14 | 0 | 2 | 2 | 8 | 15 | 1 | 1 | 2 | 6 |
| 2012–13 | SKA St. Petersburg | KHL | 34 | 0 | 5 | 5 | 8 | 5 | 1 | 0 | 1 | 2 |
| 2013–14 | Avangard Omsk | KHL | 24 | 1 | 2 | 3 | 2 | — | — | — | — | — |
| 2013–14 | Admiral Vladivostok | KHL | 24 | 1 | 3 | 4 | 8 | 5 | 1 | 0 | 1 | 4 |
| 2014–15 | Lada Togliatti | KHL | 58 | 2 | 8 | 10 | 14 | — | — | — | — | — |
| 2015–16 | Lada Togliatti | KHL | 60 | 10 | 10 | 20 | 18 | — | — | — | — | — |
| 2016–17 | Salavat Yulaev Ufa | KHL | 42 | 1 | 2 | 3 | 14 | — | — | — | — | — |
| 2017–18 | Lada Togliatti | KHL | 50 | 2 | 7 | 9 | 17 | — | — | — | — | — |
| 2018–19 | Amur Khabarovsk | KHL | 38 | 1 | 4 | 5 | 16 | — | — | — | — | — |
| 2019–20 | HK Dukla Ingema Michalovce | SVK | 50 | 0 | 5 | 5 | 37 | — | — | — | — | — |
| RSL totals | | | 227 | 30 | 32 | 62 | 237 | 29 | 3 | 0 | 3 | 28 |
| KHL totals | | | 500 | 28 | 78 | 106 | 155 | 29 | 3 | 3 | 6 | 20 |

=== International ===
| Year | Team | Event | Result | GP | G | A | Pts | PIM |
|---|---|---|---|---|---|---|---|---|
| 2005 | Russia | WJC | 2nd place, silver medalist(s) | 6 | 1 | 5 | 6 | 27 |
| 2008 | Russia | WC | 1st place, gold medalist(s) | 5 | 0 | 1 | 1 | 4 |
| Junior totals | | | | 6 | 1 | 5 | 6 | 27 |
| Senior totals | | | | 5 | 0 | 1 | 1 | 4 |
