= Sachar Blank =

German professional ice hockey player

- Born: July 10, 1985 (age 39); Karaganda, Kazakh SSR, Soviet Union
- Height: 6 ft 2 in (188 cm)
- Weight: 198 lb (90 kg; 14 st 2 lb)
- Position: Left wing
- Shoots: Left
- 2.GBun team Former teams: Heilbronner Falken; Adler Mannheim; Hannover Scorpions
- NHL draft: Undrafted
- Playing career: 2003–present

Sachar Blank (born July 10, 1985) is a German professional ice hockey player currently playing with Heilbronner Falken of the German 2nd Bundesliga. He has previously playing for Adler Mannheim and the Hannover Scorpions in the Deutsche Eishockey Liga (DEL).
