= Petr Vrána =

Czech ice hockey player (born 1985)

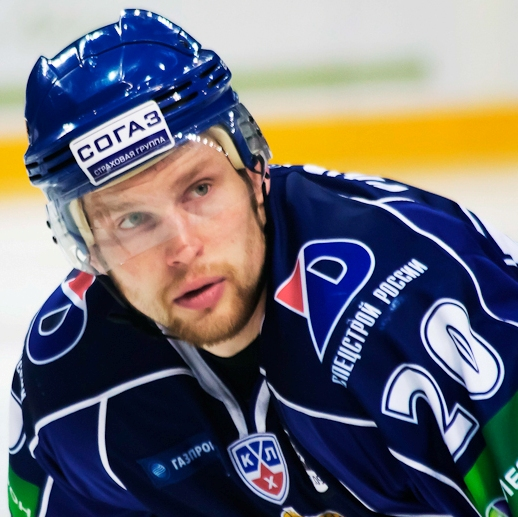
- Vrána in 2011 with Amur Khabarovsk
- Born: March 29, 1985 (age 41) Šternberk, Czechoslovakia
- Height: 5 ft 10 in (178 cm)
- Weight: 184 lb (83 kg; 13 st 2 lb)
- Position: Centre
- Shoots: Left
- ELH team Former teams: HC Oceláři Třinec; HC Havířov; New Jersey Devils; HC Vítkovice; Amur Khabarovsk; HC Lev Praha; Atlant Moscow Oblast; Ak Bars Kazan; Brynäs IF; HC Sparta Praha
- NHL draft: 42nd overall, 2003; New Jersey Devils
- Playing career: 2005–present

Petr Vrána (born March 29, 1985) is a Czech professional ice hockey centre who currently plays for HC Oceláři Třinec of the Czech Extraliga (ELH). Selected by the New Jersey Devils in the 2003 NHL entry draft, he played 16 games in the National Hockey League with the Devils during the 2008–09 season. Vrána also spent four seasons in the Kontinental Hockey League. Internationally Vrána has played for the Czech national team at the junior and senior level, including at two World Championships.

== Playing career ==
Vrána is a native of Sternberk and logged his first minutes in the Czech Extraliga with HC Havirov during the 2001–02 season and moved to Canada for the following year, joining the Halifax Mooseheads in the Quebec Major Junior Hockey League. He was drafted in the second round, 42nd overall, by the New Jersey Devils in the 2003 NHL entry draft and signed with the Devils in May 2004. He remained with the Mooseheads until the end of the 2004-05 campaign and then gained three years of AHL experience with the Albany River Rats and the Lowell Devils. He made his NHL debut with the New Jersey Devils on October 18, 2008, against the Washington Capitals, becoming the 13th player in Devils' history to chip in with a goal in his first NHL contest: He scored against Brent Johnson with assists by Patrik Eliáš and Johnny Oduya.

Vrána returned to the Czech Republic in 2009, signing with HC Vítkovice where he would play until 2011, when he agreed to terms with Amur Khabarovsk of the Kontinental Hockey League (KHL). After spending the 2011–12 season with Amur, he moved to fellow KHL side HC Lev Praha in 2012. On July 2, 2014, Vrána left HC Lev, after it declared bankruptcy and folded, as a free agent to sign with fellow KHL club, Atlant Moscow Oblast. Later during the 2014–15 season, he transferred to another KHL team, Ak Bars Kazan.

Vrána signed with Brynäs IF of the Swedish Hockey League (SHL) for the 2015-16 campaign and left Sweden after the season to join HC Sparta Praha of the Czech Extraliga for 2016–17.

== Personal life ==
In 2021, Vrána's Canadian wife Lindsey drowned after falling through the ice on a lake trying to save their dog.

== Career statistics ==
=== Regular season and playoffs ===
			Regular season					Playoffs
Season	Team	League	GP	G	A	Pts	PIM	GP	G	A	Pts	PIM
1999–2000	HC MBL Olomouc	CZE U18	33	6	9	15	18	—	—	—	—	—
2000–01	HC MBL Olomouc	CZE U18	41	38	48	86	32	3	1	3	4	6
2000–01	HC MBL Olomouc	CZE-2 U20	12	7	9	16	12	—	—	—	—	—
2001–02	HC Havířov Panthers	CZE U18	5	9	6	15	0	—	—	—	—	—
2001–02	HC Havířov Panthers	CZE U20	38	11	12	23	22	—	—	—	—	—
2001–02	HC Havířov Panthers	ELH	6	0	0	0	4	—	—	—	—	—
2002–03	Halifax Mooseheads	QMJHL	72	37	46	83	32	24	5	15	20	12
2003–04	Halifax Mooseheads	QMJHL	48	13	25	38	56	—	—	—	—	—
2004–05	Halifax Mooseheads	QMJHL	60	16	35	51	77	12	10	4	14	12
2005–06	Albany River Rats	AHL	74	12	23	35	91	—	—	—	—	—
2006–07	Lowell Devils	AHL	61	13	19	32	44	—	—	—	—	—
2007–08	Lowell Devils	AHL	80	20	41	61	64	—	—	—	—	—
2008–09	New Jersey Devils	NHL	16	1	0	1	2	—	—	—	—	—
2008–09	Lowell Devils	AHL	14	5	4	9	6	—	—	—	—	—
2009–10	HC Vítkovice Steel	ELH	39	7	6	13	10	16	3	3	6	8
2010–11	HC Vítkovice Steel	ELH	42	15	14	29	24	16	9	2	11	20
2011–12	Amur Khabarovsk	KHL	46	19	24	43	12	—	—	—	—	—
2012–13	Lev Praha	KHL	51	6	14	20	20	4	1	1	2	2
2013–14	Lev Praha	KHL	50	8	14	22	32	22	7	6	13	10
2014–15	Atlant Moscow Oblast	KHL	13	4	0	4	8	—	—	—	—	—
2014–15	Ak Bars Kazan	KHL	22	3	5	8	4	20	0	4	4	2
2015–16	Brynäs IF	SHL	26	1	7	8	10	—	—	—	—	—
2016–17	HC Sparta Praha	ELH	50	21	26	47	34	4	2	2	4	4
2017–18	HC Sparta Praha	ELH	51	7	18	25	28	2	1	0	1	2
2018–19	HC Sparta Praha	ELH	37	8	18	26	18	—	—	—	—	—
2018–19	HC Oceláři Třinec	ELH	12	1	4	5	0	17	3	7	10	0
2019–20	HC Oceláři Třinec	ELH	47	12	26	38	14	—	—	—	—	—
2020–21	HC Oceláři Třinec	ELH	48	11	21	32	24	16	2	9	11	4
2021–22	HC Oceláři Třinec	ELH	52	13	13	26	26	14	3	3	6	8
2022–23	HC Oceláři Třinec	ELH	3	0	1	1	2	20	1	1	2	2
ELH totals			387	95	147	242	184	105	24	27	51	48
NHL totals			16	1	0	1	2	—	—	—	—	—
KHL totals			182	40	57	97	76	46	8	11	19	14

=== International ===
Medal record

Representing Czech Republic

Ice hockey

World Junior Championships
Bronze medal – third place	2005 United States	

Year	Team	Event	GP	G	A	Pts	PIM
2002	Czech Republic	U17	5	6	9	15	8
2005	Czech Republic	WJC	7	5	3	8	16
2013	Czech Republic	WC	6	0	0	0	0
2017	Czech Republic	WC	8	1	1	2	0
Junior totals			12	11	12	23	24
Senior totals			14	1	1	2	0

Awards and achievements
Preceded by Benoît Mondou	Winner of the Michel Bergeron Trophy; 2003	Succeeded by Sidney Crosby
Preceded by Benoît Mondou	Winner of the RDS Cup; 2003	Succeeded by Sidney Crosby
