= Alexander Nikulin (ice hockey) =

Russian ice hockey player (born 1985)

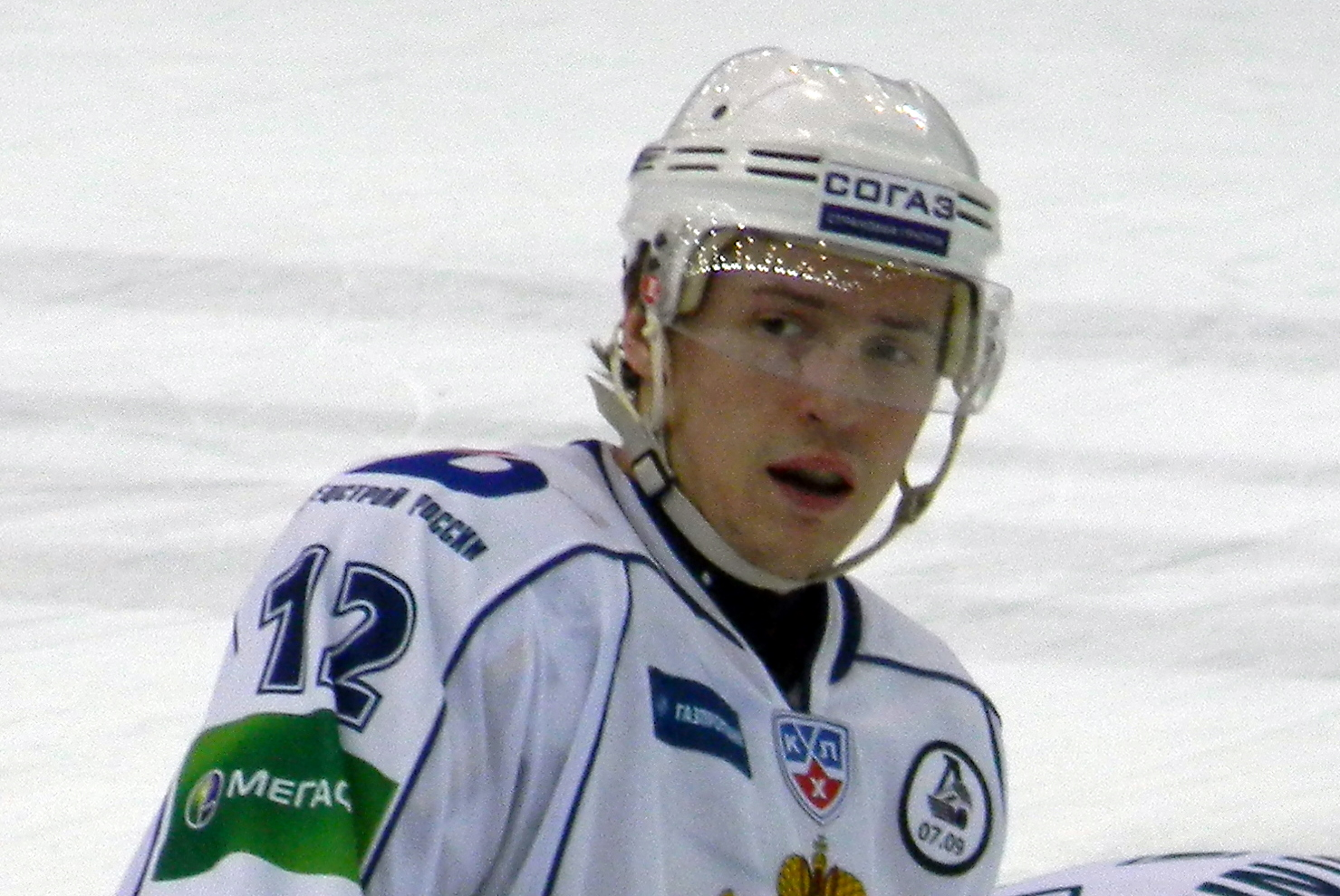
- Nikulin in 2012 with Amur Khabarovsk
- Born: August 25, 1985 (age 40) Perm, Soviet Union
- Height: 6 ft 1 in (185 cm)
- Weight: 205 lb (93 kg; 14 st 9 lb)
- Position: Center
- Shoots: Left
- Mestis team Former teams: TUTO Hockey; CSKA Moscow; Ottawa Senators; Phoenix Coyotes; Amur Khabarovsk; Sibir Novosibirsk; Spartak Moscow; HC Neftekhimik Nizhnekamsk; HC Lada Togliatti; HC Vityaz; MHk 32 Liptovský Mikuláš
- NHL draft: 122nd overall, 2004; Ottawa Senators
- Playing career: 2004–present

Alexander Sergeevich Nikulin (Russian: Александр Сергеевич Никулин; born August 25, 1985) is a Russian professional ice hockey player. Nikulin is currently playing with TUTO Hockey in the Finnish Mestis.

== Playing career ==
Alexander turned professional with HC CSKA Moscow of the Russian Super League in 2004. After playing three seasons with CSKA, Alexander signed with the Ottawa Senators who had drafted him 122nd overall in the 2004 NHL entry draft. Nikulin played his first NHL game for the Ottawa Senators on November 22, 2007 against the Pittsburgh Penguins.

In the 2008–09 season Nikulin was assigned to the Binghamton Senators of the AHL. Disappointed with his slow progress to the NHL with the Senators, Nikulin demanded a trade or voiced the possibility of returning to Russia. On November 3, 2008, Nikulin was traded to the Phoenix Coyotes for Drew Fata. Nikulin was then assigned to affiliate, the San Antonio Rampage, where he spent the majority of the season, only playing in a single game with the Coyotes.

On May 24, 2009, failing an adaptation to the North American style, Nikulin signed with his former team, CSKA Moscow of the KHL, for the 2009-10 season.

During the 2014–15 season, Nikulin's third stint with CSKA was cut short to 5 scoreless games after he was waived and claimed by Neftekhimik Nizhnekamsk on October 29, 2014.

On July 5, 2015, Nikulin continued his career in the KHL, signing a contract with HC Lada Togliatti.

== Personal ==
While with the Senators, Nikulin maintained a blog of his transition to North America, which became popular due to its candour.

== Career statistics ==
=== Regular season and playoffs ===
			Regular season					Playoffs
Season	Team	League	GP	G	A	Pts	PIM	GP	G	A	Pts	PIM
2001–02	Molot–Prikamie–2 Perm	RUS-3	37	14	7	21	20	—	—	—	—	—
2002–03	Molot–Prikamie–2 Perm	RUS-3	51	23	12	35	68	—	—	—	—	—
2003–04	CSKA–2 Moscow	RUS-3	55	23	27	50	60	—	—	—	—	—
2004–05	CSKA Moscow	RSL	16	3	3	6	0	—	—	—	—	—
2004–05	CSKA–2 Moscow	RUS-3	6	2	1	3	0	—	—	—	—	—
2005–06	CSKA Moscow	RSL	51	10	11	21	22	7	1	0	1	2
2006–07	CSKA Moscow	RSL	33	5	11	16	8	12	4	2	6	4
2006–07	CSKA–2 Moscow	RUS-3	4	2	3	5	0	—	—	—	—	—
2007–08	Binghamton Senators	AHL	71	14	36	50	34	—	—	—	—	—
2007–08	Ottawa Senators	NHL	2	0	0	0	0	—	—	—	—	—
2008–09	Binghamton Senators	AHL	5	2	0	2	0	—	—	—	—	—
2008–09	San Antonio Rampage	AHL	64	7	16	23	20	—	—	—	—	—
2008–09	Phoenix Coyotes	NHL	1	0	0	0	0	—	—	—	—	—
2009–10	CSKA Moscow	KHL	42	5	17	22	2	3	0	0	0	0
2010–11	CSKA Moscow	KHL	7	0	1	1	0	—	—	—	—	—
2010–11	Amur Khabarovsk	KHL	45	5	17	22	4	—	—	—	—	—
2011–12	Amur Khabarovsk	KHL	44	6	20	26	12	—	—	—	—	—
2012–13	Amur Khabarovsk	KHL	14	1	2	3	2	—	—	—	—	—
2012–13	Sibir Novosibirsk	KHL	36	4	11	15	6	7	1	1	2	0
2013–14	Spartak Moscow	KHL	45	4	4	8	8	—	—	—	—	—
2014–15	CSKA Moscow	KHL	5	0	0	0	4	—	—	—	—	—
2014–15	Buran Voronezh	VHL	7	4	3	7	6	—	—	—	—	—
2014–15	Neftekhimik Nizhnekamsk	KHL	22	1	4	5	4	—	—	—	—	—
2015–16	Lada Togliatti	KHL	16	0	2	2	8	—	—	—	—	—
2015–16	HC Vityaz	KHL	26	4	6	10	0	—	—	—	—	—
2016–17	HC Vityaz	KHL	51	8	14	22	6	4	1	1	2	0
2017–18	HC Vityaz	KHL	48	11	14	25	6	—	—	—	—	—
2018–19	HC Vityaz	KHL	52	3	14	17	6	2	0	0	0	0
2019–20	MHk 32 Liptovský Mikuláš	SVK	2	0	0	0	0	—	—	—	—	—
2019–20	TUTO Hockey	Mestis	11	4	9	13	29	—	—	—	—	—
2021–22	TUTO Hockey	Mestis	42	9	24	33	20	—	—	—	—	—
RSL totals			100	18	26	44	30	19	5	2	7	6
NHL totals			3	0	0	0	0	—	—	—	—	—
KHL totals			453	52	126	178	68	16	2	2	4	0

=== International ===
Year	Team	Event	GP	G	A	Pts	PIM
2005	Russia	WJC	6	1	1	2	2
Junior totals			6	1	1	2	2
