= Rostislav Olesz =

Czech ice hockey player (born 1985)

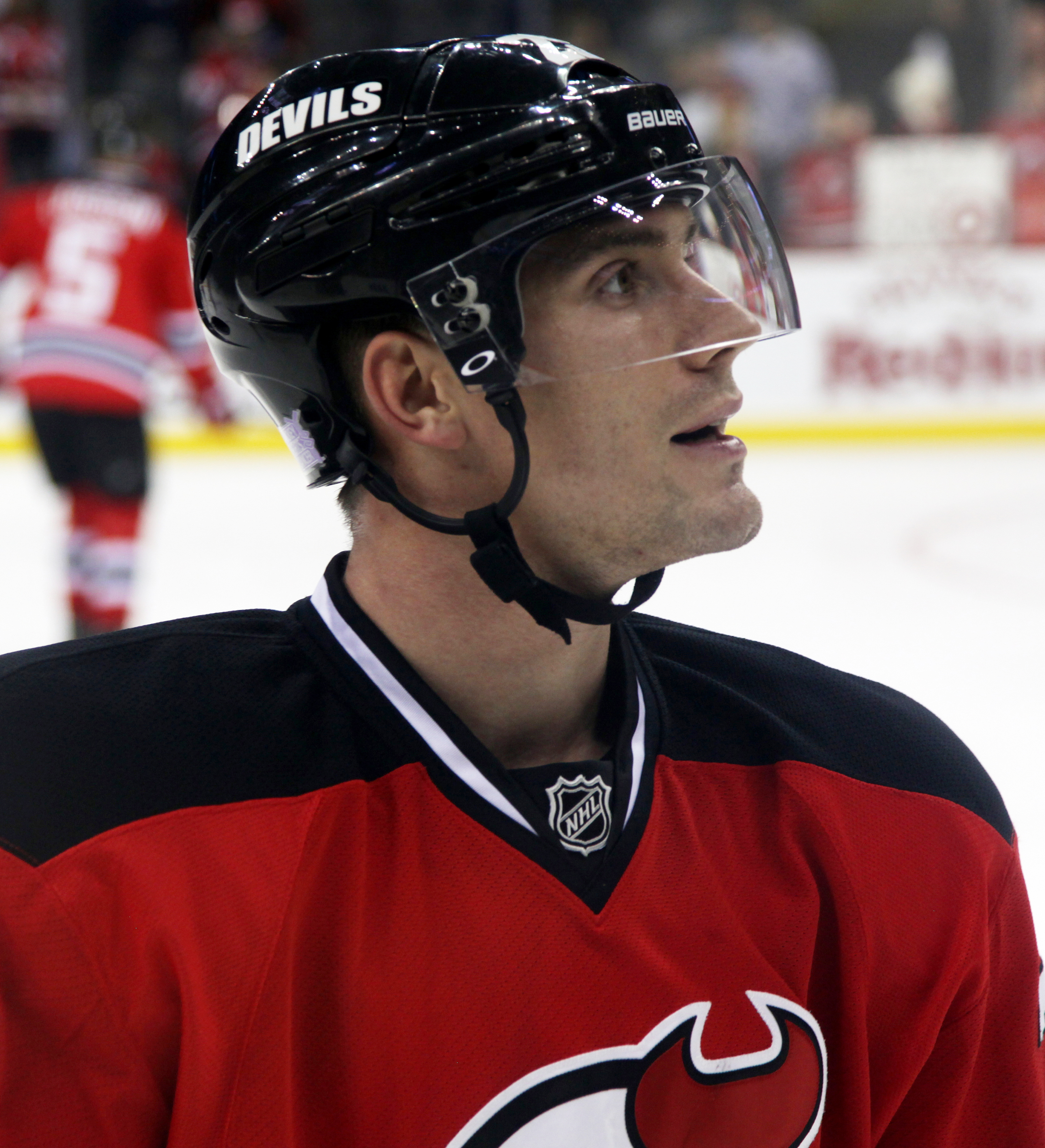
- Olesz with the New Jersey Devils in 2013
- Born: 10 October 1985 (age 40) Ostrava, Czechoslovakia
- Height: 6 ft 2 in (188 cm)
- Weight: 215 lb (98 kg; 15 st 5 lb)
- Position: Left wing
- Shot: Left
- CZE.2 team Former teams: HK Nový Jičín; HC Vítkovice Ridera; HC Sparta Praha; Florida Panthers; Chicago Blackhawks; New Jersey Devils; SC Bern; SCL Tigers; HC Olomouc
- National team: Czech Republic
- NHL draft: 7th overall, 2004; Florida Panthers
- Playing career: 2005–2024

Rostislav Olesz (born 10 October 1985) is a professional ice hockey left winger for HC Olomouc of the Czech Extraliga (ELH). Olesz was drafted in the first round, seventh overall, by the Florida Panthers in the 2004 NHL entry draft.

== Playing career ==
On 24 June 2011, Olesz was traded by the Florida Panthers to the Chicago Blackhawks in exchange for defenceman Brian Campbell. On 17 November 2011, Olesz was assigned by the Blackhawks to their American Hockey League (AHL) affiliate, the Rockford IceHogs, after clearing waivers.

On 28 June 2013, Olesz became an unrestricted free agent after the Blackhawks used one of their compliance buyouts on the remainder of his contract. Olesz quickly signed a one-year contract as a free agent with the New Jersey Devils on 5 July 2013. Olesz made his Devils debut to begin the 2013–14 season, but sparingly played ten games and registering only two assists before he was reassigned to their AHL affiliate, the Albany Devils. After five games in the AHL, Olesz was placed on unconditional waivers by the Devils with the intention to mutually terminate his contract. On 21 November, Olesz left North America and signed for the remainder of the season with the Swiss club SC Bern of the National League A.

== Career statistics ==
=== Regular season and playoffs ===
			Regular season					Playoffs
Season	Team	League	GP	G	A	Pts	PIM	GP	G	A	Pts	PIM
2000–01	HC Vítkovice	CZE U18	31	42	27	69	57	2	2	3	5	0
2000–01	HC Vítkovice	CZE U20	15	8	2	10	16	—	—	—	—	—
2000–01	HC Vítkovice	ELH	3	0	1	1	0	—	—	—	—	—
2001–02	HC Vítkovice	CZE U18	2	2	0	2	0	—	—	—	—	—
2001–02	HC Vítkovice	CZE U20	34	19	20	39	81	2	0	0	0	2
2001–02	HC Vítkovice	ELH	11	1	2	3	0	—	—	—	—	—
2002–03	HC Vítkovice	CZE U20	7	1	1	2	12	—	—	—	—	—
2002–03	HC Vítkovice	ELH	40	6	3	9	41	5	0	0	0	2
2002–03	HC Dukla Jihlava	CZE.2	2	1	0	1	0	1	0	0	0	0
2002–03	HC Slezan Opava	CZE.2	1	0	0	0	0	—	—	—	—	—
2003–04	HC Vítkovice	CZE U20	3	2	0	2	0	—	—	—	—	—
2003–04	HC Vítkovice	ELH	35	1	11	12	10	6	2	1	3	4
2004–05	HC Sparta Praha	CZE U20	—	—	—	—	—	1	0	1	1	0
2004–05	HC Sparta Praha	ELH	47	6	7	13	12	5	0	2	2	0
2005–06	Florida Panthers	NHL	59	8	13	21	24	—	—	—	—	—
2006–07	Florida Panthers	NHL	75	11	19	30	24	—	—	—	—	—
2006–07	Rochester Americans	AHL	4	1	2	3	4	—	—	—	—	—
2007–08	Florida Panthers	NHL	56	14	12	26	16	—	—	—	—	—
2008–09	Florida Panthers	NHL	37	4	5	9	8	—	—	—	—	—
2009–10	Florida Panthers	NHL	78	14	15	29	28	—	—	—	—	—
2010–11	Florida Panthers	NHL	44	6	11	17	8	—	—	—	—	—
2011–12	Chicago Blackhawks	NHL	6	0	0	0	6	—	—	—	—	—
2011–12	Rockford IceHogs	AHL	50	17	24	41	32	—	—	—	—	—
2012–13	Rockford IceHogs	AHL	14	7	12	19	4	—	—	—	—	—
2013–14	New Jersey Devils	NHL	10	0	2	2	0	—	—	—	—	—
2013–14	Albany Devils	AHL	5	1	3	4	4	—	—	—	—	—
2013–14	SC Bern	NLA	23	7	4	11	12	—	—	—	—	—
2014–15	HC Vítkovice Steel	ELH	38	12	10	22	32	4	0	2	2	18
2015–16	HC Vítkovice Steel	ELH	34	17	12	29	18	—	—	—	—	—
2015–16	SCL Tigers	NLA	15	4	4	8	2	—	—	—	—	—
2016–17	HC Vítkovice Ridera	ELH	41	8	12	20	28	5	0	1	1	4
2017–18	HC Vítkovice Ridera	ELH	52	16	14	30	44	4	0	0	0	6
2018–19	HC Vítkovice Ridera	ELH	31	10	9	19	28	8	0	1	1	2
2019–20	HC Olomouc	ELH	52	8	11	19	10	—	—	—	—	—
2020–21	HC Olomouc	ELH	46	6	9	15	14	7	3	0	3	2
2021–22	HC Olomouc	ELH	36	4	8	12	20	1	0	0	0	0
2022–23	HC Olomouc	ELH	38	4	10	14	37	1	0	0	0	0
2023–24	HK Nový Jičín	CZE.3	28	8	12	20	16	8	3	0	3	10
ELH totals			509	99	119	218	294	48	6	7	13	40
NHL totals			365	57	77	134	118	—	—	—	—	—

Medal record

Representing Czech Republic

Ice hockey

Olympic Games
Bronze medal – third place	2006 Turin	

World Junior Championships
Bronze medal – third place	2005 United States	

=== International ===
Year	Team	Event	Result	GP	G	A	Pts	PIM
2002	Czech Republic	U18	2nd place, silver medalist(s)	5	3
2003	Czech Republic	WJC18	6th	6	2	3	5	4
2004	Czech Republic	WJC	4th	6	3	2	5	6
2005	Czech Republic	WJC	3rd place, bronze medalist(s)	7	7	3	10	12
2006	Czech Republic	OG	3rd place, bronze medalist(s)	8	0	0	0	2
2007	Czech Republic	WC	7th	7	2	3	5	4
2009	Czech Republic	WC	6th	7	0	1	1	2
Junior totals				19	12	8	20	22
Senior totals				22	2	4	6	8

Awards and achievements
Preceded by Anthony Stewart	Florida Panthers first-round draft pick 2004	Succeeded by Kenndal McArdle
