= Nigel Dawes =

Canadian-Kazakh ice hockey player

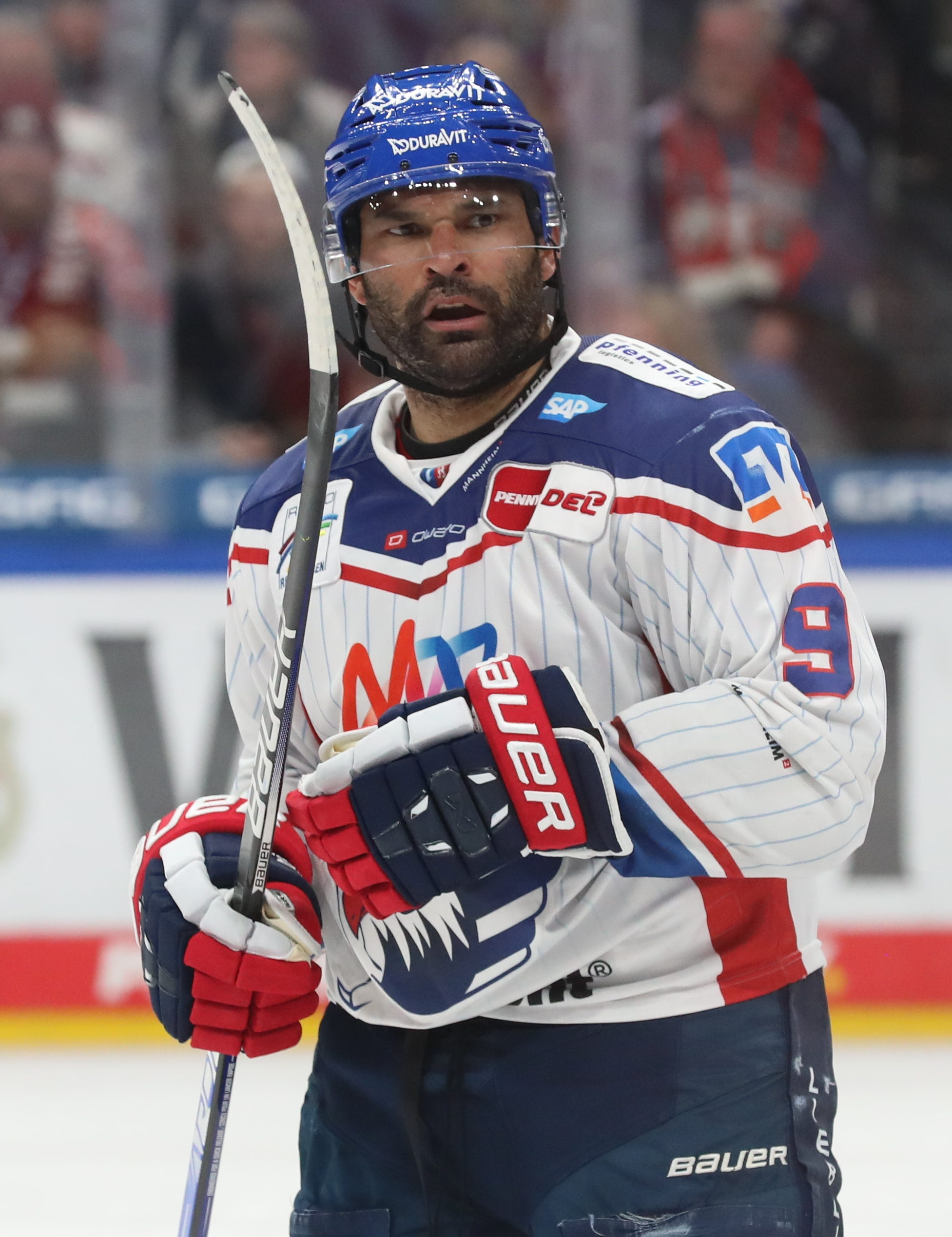
- Dawes with the Adler Mannheim in 2022
- Born: February 9, 1985 (age 41) Winnipeg, Manitoba, Canada
- Height: 5 ft 9 in (175 cm)
- Weight: 200 lb (91 kg; 14 st 4 lb)
- Position: Left wing
- Shot: Left
- Played for: New York Rangers; Phoenix Coyotes; Calgary Flames; Atlanta Thrashers; Montreal Canadiens; Barys Astana; Avtomobilist Yekaterinburg; Ak Bars Kazan; Adler Mannheim
- National team: Kazakhstan
- NHL draft: 149th overall, 2003; New York Rangers
- Playing career: 2004–2023

Nigel Alexander Dawes (born February 9, 1985) is a Canadian–Kazakhstani former professional ice-hockey winger. He played 212 games in five seasons in the National Hockey League (NHL) for the New York Rangers, Phoenix Coyotes, Calgary Flames, Atlanta Thrashers, and Montreal Canadiens.

After leaving the NHL, Dawes became known as a goalscorer in Europe particularly in the Kontinental Hockey League (KHL) with Barys Astana, Avtomobilist Yekaterinburg and Ak Bars Kazan scoring 267 goals and 505 points in 543 games in the KHL - making him fifth all-time in KHL point scoring and second in goals.

Dawes played for the Kootenay Ice in the Western Hockey League, with Kootenay he was part of the team that won the 2002 Memorial Cup. He was also part of Team Canada's IIHF World Junior Championship teams of 2004 and 2005, winning Gold at the latter. He spent his senior hockey career on the Kazakhstani national team, after earning naturalization status in the country.

== Playing career ==
Dawes played junior ice hockey for the Kootenay Ice in the Western Hockey League. In his first year, the Ice won the 2002 Memorial Cup after winning the President's Cup as champions of the WHL. Dawes improved his play in his next two seasons in the WHL, and, for the 2003–04 season, he was named a first team All-Star in the Western Conference, the winner of the Brad Hornung Trophy (most sportsmanlike), and the Ice's most valuable player.

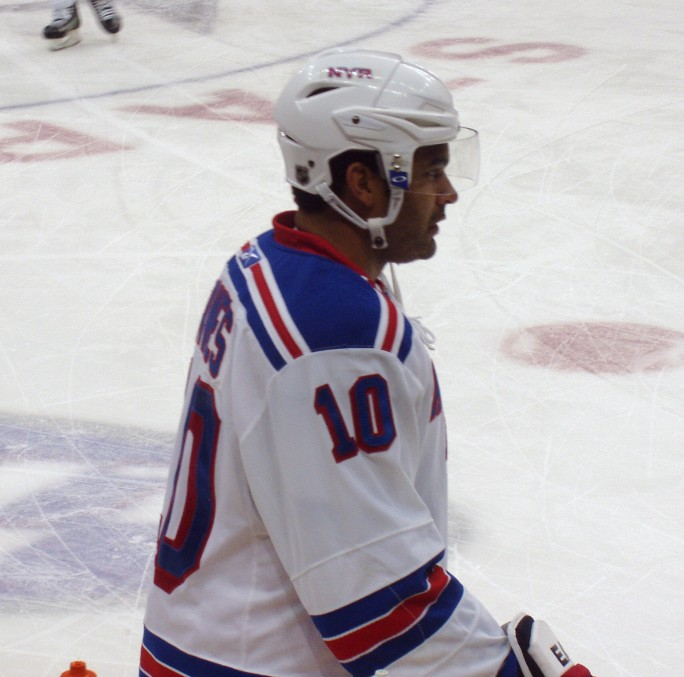
Dawes with the Rangers

Dawes was drafted in the fifth round, 149th overall, in the 2003 NHL entry draft by the New York Rangers, after two seasons in the WHL. After three seasons of junior hockey and four games in the American Hockey League for the Hartford Wolf Pack at the end of the 2003–04 season, the Rangers signed Dawes to his first professional contract on September 1, 2004, when he was 19 years old. Dawes went on to play another season with the Ice, recognized for his talent as a finalist for the Four Broncos Memorial Trophy (WHL player of the year), before breaking into the professional game in the AHL. Dawes finished his Kootenay Ice career as the franchise leader in goals, with 159 scored in 245 games.

Dawes scored his first NHL goal against Andrew Raycroft on October 21, 2006, in the Rangers 5–4 win over the Toronto Maple Leafs. After playing in seven games then being a healthy scratch for seven of the next eight, Dawes was sent down to play with the Wolf Pack for the rest of the 2006–07 season. He returned to play in the Rangers' final game of the playoffs on May 6, 2007. Game six against the Buffalo Sabres in the Eastern Conference Semifinals was Dawes's first NHL playoff game. While Dawes was trying to block a shot, the first Sabres goal deflected off of his body to go into the net past goalie Henrik Lundqvist. The Rangers lost the game 5–4 to lose the series 4–2.

Dawes recorded his first NHL assist in the 2007–08 season. Dawes had become a good shootout option for the Rangers, scoring four times on seven attempts at that point. During regular play, played as high as the second line at points during the 2007–08 season.

On July 16, 2008, Dawes re-signed with the Rangers to a one-year, $587,500 contract. On March 4, 2009, Dawes was traded to the Phoenix Coyotes along with Dmitri Kalinin and Petr Průcha for Derek Morris. On July 16, 2009, Dawes was claimed off waivers by the Calgary Flames.

On September 8, 2010, Dawes signed a one-year, two-way contract with the Atlanta Thrashers worth $600,000 in the NHL and $105,000 in the American Hockey League (AHL). He was traded on February 24, 2011, to the Montreal Canadiens, along with Brent Sopel for Ben Maxwell and a 4th-round pick in the 2011 NHL entry draft.

On May 31, 2011, Dawes left the NHL and signed a one-year contract with Kazakhstan-based Barys Astana of the Kontinental Hockey League (KHL). He continued the relationship through the 2017–18 season.

On July 14, 2020, Dawes as a free agent and the fifth leading scorer in KHL history extended his tenure in Russia, signing a one-year contract with Ak Bars Kazan.

On June 11, 2021, Dawes signed a two-year contract with Adler Mannheim of the Deutsche Eishockey Liga (DEL).

At the conclusion of his contract with Adler Mannheim and hampered by injury, Dawes announced his retirement following 17 professional seasons.

== International play ==
Medal record

Men's ice hockey

Representing Canada

World Junior Championships
Silver medal – second place	2004 Finland	
Gold medal – first place	2005 USA	

Dawes played for Canada in the 2004 and 2005 World Junior Ice Hockey Championships, winning silver and gold medals, respectively. In 2004, Dawes led all players with six goals to go along with five assists in six games, tying for first with 11 points. Two goals and one assist came in the gold medal game against the United States, after which Dawes was named as Canada's player of the game. He registered two goals and four assists in six games in 2005.

On March 24, 2016, the IIHF announced it had approved a request to allow Dawes, Brandon Bochenski, and Dustin Boyd to play for Kazakhstan at the 2016 IIHF World Championship. All three players received Kazakhstani citizenship via naturalization, making them eligible.

== Personal life ==
Dawes was born in Winnipeg to a Canadian mother and Jamaican father.

== Career statistics ==
=== Regular season and playoffs ===
			Regular season					Playoffs
Season	Team	League	GP	G	A	Pts	PIM	GP	G	A	Pts	PIM
2000–01	Winnipeg Warriors AAA	MMHL	36	55	41	96	74	13	14	11	25	10
2000–01	Winnipeg Saints	MJHL	4	1	2	3	0	—	—	—	—	—
2001–02	Kootenay Ice	WHL	54	15	19	34	14	22	9	6	15	8
2002–03	Kootenay Ice	WHL	72	47	45	92	54	11	4	8	12	6
2003–04	Kootenay Ice	WHL	56	47	23	70	31	4	1	2	3	10
2003–04	Hartford Wolf Pack	AHL	4	0	0	0	0	—	—	—	—	—
2004–05	Kootenay Ice	WHL	63	50	26	76	30	12	5	10	15	5
2005–06	Hartford Wolf Pack	AHL	77	35	32	67	21	13	6	6	12	9
2006–07	New York Rangers	NHL	8	1	0	1	0	1	0	0	0	0
2006–07	Hartford Wolf Pack	AHL	65	27	33	60	29	7	5	6	11	9
2007–08	Hartford Wolf Pack	AHL	20	14	20	34	2	—	—	—	—	—
2007–08	New York Rangers	NHL	61	14	15	29	10	10	2	2	4	0
2008–09	New York Rangers	NHL	52	10	9	19	15	—	—	—	—	—
2008–09	Phoenix Coyotes	NHL	12	0	2	2	0	—	—	—	—	—
2009–10	Calgary Flames	NHL	66	14	18	32	18	—	—	—	—	—
2010–11	Atlanta Thrashers	NHL	9	0	1	1	0	—	—	—	—	—
2010–11	Chicago Wolves	AHL	47	27	17	44	17	—	—	—	—	—
2010–11	Hamilton Bulldogs	AHL	19	14	14	28	7	20	14	8	22	8
2010–11	Montreal Canadiens	NHL	4	0	0	0	0	—	—	—	—	—
2011–12	Barys Astana	KHL	52	16	17	33	34	7	1	2	3	2
2012–13	Barys Astana	KHL	51	20	14	34	28	7	7	2	9	4
2013–14	Barys Astana	KHL	54	26	23	49	18	7	2	2	4	4
2014–15	Barys Astana	KHL	60	32	24	56	48	7	4	3	7	10
2015–16	Barys Astana	KHL	55	31	22	53	16	—	—	—	—	—
2016–17	Barys Astana	KHL	59	36	27	63	31	10	7	3	10	4
2017–18	Barys Astana	KHL	46	35	21	56	26	—	—	—	—	—
2018–19	Avtomobilist Yekaterinburg	KHL	60	28	41	69	12	8	2	3	5	0
2019–20	Avtomobilist Yekaterinburg	KHL	59	20	30	50	13	5	0	1	1	2
2020–21	Ak Bars Kazan	KHL	47	23	20	43	10	14	3	3	6	0
2021–22	Adler Mannheim	DEL	54	19	23	42	10	6	4	2	6	8
2022–23	Adler Mannheim	DEL	36	13	11	24	20	—	—	—	—	—
NHL totals			212	39	45	84	43	11	2	2	4	0
KHL totals			543	267	238	505	236	65	26	19	45	26

=== International ===
Year	Team	Event	Result	GP	G	A	Pts	PIM
2002	Canada Western	U17	5th	5	2	2	4	4
2002	Canada	U18	1st place, gold medalist(s)	5	5	6	11	2
2004	Canada	WJC	2nd place, silver medalist(s)	6	6	5	11	10
2005	Canada	WJC	1st place, gold medalist(s)	6	2	4	6	6
2016	Kazakhstan	OGQ	NQ	2	1	1	2	0
2016	Kazakhstan	WC	16th	7	4	4	8	4
2017	Kazakhstan	WC D1	19th	5	5	4	9	0
2020	Kazakhstan	OGQ	NQ	2	0	2	2	0
Junior totals				22	15	16	32	22
Senior totals				16	10	11	21	4

== Awards and honours ==
Award	Year
WHL
West First All-Star Team	2004, 2005
West Second All-Star Team	2003
Brad Hornung Trophy	2004
AHL
All-Star Game	2008
Second All-Star Team	2011
KHL
All-Star Game	2015, 2016, 2017, 2018, 2019, 2020
Most goals (35)	2018

== See also ==
- List of black ice hockey players
