= 2005 World Junior Ice Hockey Championships =

2005 IIHF World U20 Championship

Tournament details
- Host country: United States
- Venue(s): Ralph Engelstad Arena (Grand Forks); Ralph Engelstad Arena (Thief River Falls)
- Dates: December 25, 2004 – January 4, 2005
- Teams: 10

Final positions
- Champions: Canada (11th title)
- Runners-up: Russia
- Third place: Czech Republic
- Fourth place: United States

Tournament statistics
- Games played: 31
- Goals scored: 205 (6.61 per game)
- Attendance: 193,256 (6,234 per game)
- Scoring leader: (Canada) Patrice Bergeron (13 points)

The 2005 World Junior Ice Hockey Championships (2005 WJC) was held between December 25, 2004, and January 4, 2005, at the Ralph Engelstad Arena in Grand Forks, North Dakota, and at the Ralph Engelstad Arena in Thief River Falls, Minnesota, United States. Canada won the gold medal. Jim Johannson oversaw administration of the event on behalf of USA Hockey.

== Venues ==
Ralph Engelstad Arena Capacity: 11,640	Ralph Engelstad Arena Capacity: 2,569
United States – Grand Forks	United States – Thief River Falls

== Top Division ==
=== Preliminary round ===
==== Group A ====
Pos	Team	Pld	W	D	L	GF	GA	GD	Pts	Qualification
1	Russia	4	3	0	1	21	9	+12	6	Semifinals
2	Czech Republic	4	3	0	1	16	9	+7	6	Quarterfinals
3	United States	4	2	0	2	15	16	−1	4	Quarterfinals
4	Switzerland	4	1	0	3	12	17	−5	2	Relegation round
5	Belarus	4	1	0	3	9	22	−13	2	Relegation round

Source: IIHF.com at the Wayback Machine

December 25, 2004	Belarus	2–7	Czech Republic	Ralph Engelstad Arena, Thief River Falls; Attendance: 543

Game reference
Ugarov 30:14 (PP1); Asmalouski 54:44 (SH1) / Goals / Frolík 14:53 (PP1); Vrána 20:27, 59:18 (PP1); Kvapil 33:13 (PP1); Olesz 45:31 (SH1), 49:15; Petružálek 47:01

December 25, 2004	Russia	4–5	United States	Ralph Engelstad Arena, Grand Forks; Attendance: 9,274

Game reference
Rylov 7:25; Shirokov 18:01 (PS); Ovechkin 18:41; Pestunov 27:17 / Goals / Stafford 4:22; Bourque 5:45 (PP1); Fritsche 18:19, 28:40 (SH1); Schremp 23:15 (PP1)

December 26, 2004	Switzerland	5–0	Belarus	Ralph Engelstad Arena, Grand Forks; Attendance: 8,510

Game reference
Wick 11:41; Romy 33:27 (SH1), 51:03; Stancescu 35:11; Kaser 39:37 / Goals

December 27, 2004	Czech Republic	1–4	Russia	Ralph Engelstad Arena, Thief River Falls; Attendance: 972

Game reference
Hrdel 29:36 / Goals / Radulov 7:03 (PP1); Shirokov 10:44 (PP1); Malkin 21:14; Lisin 47:05

December 27, 2004	United States	6–4	Switzerland	Ralph Engelstad Arena, Grand Forks; Attendance: 8,133

Game reference
Callahan 9:36; Porter 28:18; Stafford 41:34 (PP1); Hensick 42:25; Schremp 44:07; O'Sullivan 47:06 / Goals / Benoît 40:45; Stancescu 41:04, 45:20; Hurlimann 44:44

December 28, 2004	Russia	7–2	Belarus	Ralph Engelstad Arena, Thief River Falls; Attendance: 825

Game reference
Shirokov 1:38 (PP1); Ovechkin 10:12 (PP1), 33:54; Voloshenko 13:01, 48:04; Radulov 49:29; Nikulin 49:50 / Goals / Efimenko 29:05; Zakharov 40:43

December 29, 2004	Czech Republic	5–2	Switzerland	Ralph Engelstad Arena, Grand Forks; Attendance: 8,259

Game reference
Hluchý 5:13; Frolík 34:09; Vrána 36:41; Kvapil 46:02; Olesz 59:30 / Goals / Hurlimann 33:27, 46:45

December 29, 2004	Belarus	5–3	United States	Ralph Engelstad Arena, Grand Forks; Attendance: 8,038

Game reference
Efyamenka 9:14 (SH1); Karaha 15:38; Savin 22:10; Kukushkin 23:26; A. Kostitsyn 34:16 / Goals / Kessel 17:47; Stafford 39:14 (PP1); Brown 42:11

December 30, 2004	Switzerland	1–6	Russia	Ralph Engelstad Arena, Thief River Falls; Attendance: 1,197

Game reference
Kaser 21:09 (PP1) / Goals / Vorobiev 4:58 (PP1); Pestunov 17:20; Ovechkin 27:07 (PP1), 58:16; Galimov 29:37; Misharin 51:12 (PP1)

December 30, 2004	United States	1–3	Czech Republic	Ralph Engelstad Arena, Grand Forks; Attendance: 8,734

Game reference
Fritsche 39:07 / Goals / Olesz 12:56, 59:55; Kašpar 20:57

==== Group B ====
Pos	Team	Pld	W	D	L	GF	GA	GD	Pts	Qualification
1	Canada	4	4	0	0	32	5	+27	8	Semifinals
2	Sweden	4	2	0	2	14	13	+1	4	Quarterfinals
3	Finland	4	2	0	2	10	15	−5	4	Quarterfinals
4	Slovakia	4	2	0	2	10	10	0	4	Relegation round
5	Germany	4	0	0	4	1	24	−23	0	Relegation round

Source: IIHF.com at the Wayback Machine

December 25, 2004	Slovakia	3–7	Canada	Ralph Engelstad Arena, Grand Forks; Attendance: 7,540

Game reference
Zagrapan 32:06 (PP1); Lascek 37:35; Ölvecký 41:13 / Goals / Bergeron 3:55, 21:05; Crosby 10:59 (PP1), 29:52 (PP1); Carter 32:38; MacArthur 57:44, 59:52 (PS)

December 25, 2004	Germany	1–4	Finland	Ralph Engelstad Arena, Thief River Falls; Attendance: 752

Game reference
Busch 44:03 / Goals / Makkonen 5:05 (PP1); Honkaheimo 26:47; Nokelainen 33:39 (PP1); Korpikoski 59:50 (PP1)

December 26, 2004	Sweden	6–0	Germany	Ralph Engelstad Arena, Thief River Falls; Attendance: 951

Game reference
Persson 14:18, 49:12 (PP1); Salmonsson 20:56, 50:49; Söderberg 45:10 (SH1); Granath 54:07 (PP1) / Goals

December 27, 2004	Canada	8–1	Sweden	Ralph Engelstad Arena, Grand Forks; Attendance: 10,739

Game reference
Carter 2:28; MacArthur 20:52; Dawes 23:39; Bergeron 32:49; Crosby 35:11 (PP1), 40:21 (PP1); Ladd 40:46; Getzlaf 52:32 / Goals / Fredriksson 7:29 (PP1)

December 27, 2004	Finland	0–2	Slovakia	Ralph Engelstad Arena, Thief River Falls; Attendance: 1,031

Game reference
Goals / Bulík 34:35; Meszároš 59:01 (EN)

December 28, 2004	Germany	0–9	Canada	Ralph Engelstad Arena, Grand Forks; Attendance: 8,404

Game reference
Goals / Ladd 10:05; MacArthur 10:51; Crosby 17:46 (PP2), 54:34; Barker 18:33 (PP1); Getzlaf 26:32; Stewart 32:46, 47:12; Fraser 57:47

December 29, 2004	Finland	5–4	Sweden	Ralph Engelstad Arena, Thief River Falls; Attendance: 1,393

Game reference
Makkonen 32:07 (PP1); Korpikoski 42:26 (PP1); Joensuu 42:36 (PP1); Hokkanen 54:10; Tukonen 54:47 / Goals / Åhsberg 9:11 (PP1); Nilsson 10:33; Salmonsson 30:55; Söderberg 35:18

December 29, 2004	Slovakia	5–0	Germany	Ralph Engelstad Arena, Thief River Falls; Attendance: 1,230

Game reference
Ružička 0:47, 7:43, 13:50 (PP1); Meszároš 40:57, 48:56 (PP1) / Goals

December 30, 2004	Canada	8–1	Finland	Ralph Engelstad Arena, Grand Forks; Attendance: 9,697

Game reference
Perry 4:45 (PP1), 38:45; Richards 19:38 (SH1); Carter 21:32, 34:27, 37:29; Belle 35:32; Ladd 43:06 (SH1) / Goals / Hietanen 53:46 (PP2)

December 30, 2004	Sweden	3–0	Slovakia	Ralph Engelstad Arena, Thief River Falls; Attendance: 1,325

Game reference
Salmonsson 3:11, 33:34; Söderberg 31:51 / Goals

=== Relegation round ===
Pos	Team	Pld	W	D	L	GF	GA	GD	Pts	Relegation
1	Slovakia	3	3	0	0	10	3	+7	6	
2	Switzerland	3	2	0	1	12	3	+9	4	
3	Germany	3	1	0	2	4	13	−9	2	Relegated to the 2006 Division I
4	Belarus	3	0	0	3	4	11	−7	0	Relegated to the 2006 Division I

Source: IIHF.com at the Wayback Machine

Note: Matches Switzerland 5–0 Belarus and Slovakia 5–0 Germany from the preliminary round are included as well since these results carry forward.

January 1, 2005	Switzerland	5–0	Germany	Ralph Engelstad Arena, Grand Forks; Attendance: 7,540

Game reference
Diaz 28:26; Kaser 33:28 (PP1); Schüler 39:22; Stancescu 40:53, 46:08 / Goals

January 2, 2005	Slovakia	2–1	Belarus	Ralph Engelstad Arena, Grand Forks; Attendance: 7,650

Game reference
Sekera 50:03; Ölvecký 56:35 / Goals / Zakharov 34:44

January 3, 2005	Belarus	3–4	Germany	Ralph Engelstad Arena, Grand Forks; Attendance: 7,580

Game reference
Ugarov 1:29, 13:52 (PP1); Zakharov 25:22 / Goals / Carciola 17:15; Janzen 32:45; Kink 53:44 (PP1); Reiss 58:07 (PP1)

January 3, 2005	Slovakia	3–2	Switzerland	Ralph Engelstad Arena, Grand Forks; Attendance: 7,820

Game reference
Bulík 0:29; Ölvecký 18:13; Haščák 53:07 / Goals / Benoît 26:28; Romy 48:36

Germany and Belarus are relegated to Division I for the 2006 World Junior Ice Hockey Championships.

=== Final round ===
==== Bracket ====
Quarter finals
A2	Czech Republic	3
B3	Finland	0
B2	Sweden	2
A3	United States	8

Semi finals
QF1	Czech Republic	1
B1	Canada	3
QF2	United States	2
A1	Russia	7

Final
SF1	Canada	6
SF2	Russia	1

==== Quarterfinals ====
January 1, 2005	Czech Republic	3–0	Finland	Ralph Engelstad Arena, Grand Forks; Attendance: 7,465

Game reference
Vrána 36:57 (PP1); Olesz 43:35 (SH1); Červenka 57:58 / Goals

January 1, 2005	Sweden	2–8	United States	Ralph Engelstad Arena, Grand Forks; Attendance: 8,258

Game reference
Eriksson 4:12, 33:26 / Goals / Porter 12:07; Stafford 23:08; Kessel 26:58, 44:15, 47:21; Schremp 51:08 (PP1); Suter 52:46 (PP1); Hensick 59:45

==== Semifinals ====
January 2, 2005	Canada	3–1	Czech Republic	Ralph Engelstad Arena, Grand Forks; Attendance: 10,266

Game reference
Carter 18:38; Dawes 30:02 (PP1); Bergeron 32:34 / Goals / Olesz 43:36 (SH1)

January 2, 2005	United States	2–7	Russia	Ralph Engelstad Arena, Grand Forks; Attendance: 9,024

Game reference
Schremp 8:55 (PP1); O'Sullivan 14:44 (PP1) / Goals / Lisin 1:58 (PP1); Ovechkin 4:46 (PP1), 57:46 (EN); Shirokov 16:01; Malkin 51:03, 58:49 (EN); Yunkov 59:59 (PP2)

==== Fifth place game ====
January 3, 2005	Sweden	3–4 OT	Finland	Ralph Engelstad Arena, Grand Forks; Attendance: 9,252

Game reference
Söderberg 7:12; Bergfors 34:13 (PP1), 52:35 / Goals / Mäntymaa 15:21; Seitsonen 47:08; Nurmi 59:10; Kolehmainen 61:37

==== Bronze medal game ====
January 4, 2005	Czech Republic	3–2 OT (1–1, 1–1, 0–0) (OT: 1–0)	United States	Ralph Engelstad Arena, Grand Forks; Attendance: 8,992

Game reference
Polák 3:26 (PP1); Frolík 26:03; Vrána 62:38 / Goals / Porter 16:16 (PP1); Stafford 33:12 (PP1)

==== Gold medal game ====
January 4, 2005; 19:00	Canada	6–1 (2–1, 4–0, 0–0)	Russia	Ralph Engelstad Arena, Grand Forks; Attendance: 11,862

Game reference

Jeff Glass
Goalies
Anton Khudobin
Andrei Kuznetsov
Referee:
(United States) David Hansen
Linesmen:
(Finland) Juha Kautto
(United States) Kevin Redding

Getzlaf (Carter, Ladd) – 00:51	1–0
Syvret (Coburn, Bergeron) (PP) – 08:00	2–0
	2–1	19:28 – Emelin (Shafigulin, Galimov) (PP)
Carter (Ladd, Getzlaf) – 23:33	3–1
Bergeron (Perry, Crosby) (PP) – 27:53	4–1
Stewart (Dawes, Richards) – 28:54	5–1
Phaneuf (Getzlaf, Carter) (PP) – 33:19	6–1

16 min
Penalties
33 min
32
Shots
19

=== Scoring leaders ===
Pos	Player	Country	GP	G	A	Pts	+/−	PIM
1	Patrice Bergeron	Canada	6	5	8	13	+5	6
2	Ryan Getzlaf	Canada	6	3	9	12	+14	8
3	Alexander Ovechkin	Russia	6	7	4	11	+6	4
4	Jeff Carter	Canada	6	7	3	10	+10	6
5	Rostislav Olesz	Czech Republic	7	7	3	10	+8	12
6	Evgeni Malkin	Russia	6	3	7	10	0	16
7	Sidney Crosby	Canada	6	6	3	9	+4	4
8	Drew Stafford	United States	7	5	4	9	–3	14
9	Johannes Salmonsson	Sweden	6	5	3	8	+2	0
10	Petr Vrána	Czech Republic	7	5	3	8	+8	16

GP = Games played; G = Goals; A = Assists; Pts = Points; +/− = Plus–minus; PIM = Penalties In Minutes
Source: IIHF.com

=== Goaltending leaders ===
(minimum 40% team's total ice time)

Pos	Player	Country	TOI	GA	GAA	Sv%	SO
1	Marek Schwarz	Czech Republic	361:57	13	2.15	92.49	1
2	Jeff Glass	Canada	300:00	7	1.40	92.22	0
3	Jaroslav Halák	Slovakia	360:00	13	2.17	91.56	2
4	Al Montoya	United States	393:15	22	3.36	90.39	0
5	Tuukka Rask	Finland	243:26	12	2.96	90.16	0

TOI = Time on ice (minutes:seconds); GA = Goals against; GAA = Goals against average; Sv% = Save percentage; SO = Shutouts

Source: IIHF.com

=== Awards ===
==== All-Star Team ====
Goaltender: (Czech Republic) Marek Schwarz

Defense: (Canada) Dion Phaneuf, (United States) Ryan Suter

Forwards: (Russia) Alexander Ovechkin, (Canada) Patrice Bergeron, (Canada) Jeff Carter

==== Most Valuable Player ====
(Canada) Patrice Bergeron

=== Final standings ===
	Team
1st place, gold medalist(s)	Canada
2nd place, silver medalist(s)	Russia
3rd place, bronze medalist(s)	Czech Republic
4th	United States
5th	Finland
6th	Sweden
7th	Slovakia
8th	Switzerland
9th	Germany
10th	Belarus

== Division I ==
The Division I Championships were played on December 13–19, 2004, in Sheffield, United Kingdom (Group A), and Narva, Estonia (Group B).

=== Group A ===
Pos	Team	Pld	W	D	L	GF	GA	GD	Pts	Promotion or relegation
1	Norway	5	5	0	0	29	12	+17	10	Promoted to the 2006 Top Division
2	Kazakhstan	5	4	0	1	29	15	+14	8	
3	Austria	5	3	0	2	12	16	−4	6	
4	France	5	2	0	3	18	19	−1	4	
5	Italy	5	1	0	4	11	16	−5	2	
6	Great Britain	5	0	0	5	8	29	−21	0	Relegated to the 2006 Division II

Leading scorer: Mathis Olimb, Norway (4 goals, 5 assists; 9 points).

=== Group B ===
Pos	Team	Pld	W	D	L	GF	GA	GD	Pts	Promotion or relegation
1	Latvia	5	4	1	0	28	12	+16	9	Promoted to the 2006 Top Division
2	Slovenia	5	3	0	2	28	12	+16	6	
3	Denmark	5	3	0	2	22	13	+9	6	
4	Poland	5	2	2	1	15	13	+2	6	
5	Ukraine	5	1	1	3	11	19	−8	3	
6	Estonia	5	0	0	5	6	41	−35	0	Relegated to the 2006 Division II

Leading scorer: Anže Kopitar, Slovenia (10 goals, 3 assists; 13 points).

== Division II ==
The Division II Championships were played on January 3–9, 2005, in Bucharest, Romania (Group A), and on December 13–19, 2004, in Puigcerdà, Spain (Group B).

=== Group A ===
Pos	Team	Pld	W	D	L	GF	GA	GD	Pts	Promotion or relegation
1	Japan	5	4	1	0	32	4	+28	9	Promoted to the 2006 Division I
2	Romania	5	3	1	1	23	13	+10	7	
3	Netherlands	5	3	0	2	29	14	+15	6	
4	China	5	3	0	2	16	14	+2	6	
5	Serbia and Montenegro	5	1	0	4	11	36	−25	2	
6	Lithuania	5	0	0	5	5	35	−30	0	Relegated to the 2006 Division III

=== Group B ===
Pos	Team	Pld	W	D	L	GF	GA	GD	Pts	Promotion or relegation
1	Hungary	5	5	0	0	41	10	+31	10	Promoted to the 2006 Division I
2	South Korea	5	4	0	1	46	12	+34	8	
3	Croatia	5	3	0	2	27	21	+6	6	
4	Spain	5	2	0	3	14	32	−18	4	
5	Australia	5	1	0	4	16	40	−24	2	
6	Belgium	5	0	0	5	12	41	−29	0	Relegated to the 2006 Division III

Leading scorer: Park Woo-Sang, South Korea (12 goals, 8 assists; 20 points).

== Division III ==
The Division III Championship was played on January 10–16, 2005, in Mexico City, Mexico.

Pos	Team	Pld	W	D	L	GF	GA	GD	Pts	Promotion
1	Mexico	5	5	0	0	37	6	+31	10	Promoted to the 2006 Division II
2	New Zealand	5	3	1	1	28	15	+13	7	Promoted to the 2006 Division II
3	Iceland	5	3	0	2	30	19	+11	6	
4	South Africa	5	2	1	2	15	24	−9	5	
5	Turkey	5	1	0	4	10	27	−17	2	
6	Bulgaria	5	0	0	5	10	39	−29	0	
