= 2003–04 NHL transactions =

The following is a list of all team-to-team transactions that have occurred in the National Hockey League during the 2003–04 NHL season. It lists what team each player has been traded to, or claimed by, and for which players or draft picks, if applicable.

== Waiver ==
December 19, 2003	To Ottawa Senators Wade Brookbank	To Vancouver Canucks Claimed on waivers

== May ==
May 12, 2003	To Tampa Bay Lightning 9th-rd pick - 2003 entry draft (# 273 - Albert Vishnyakov)	To Pittsburgh Penguins Marc Bergevin
May 28, 2003	To Los Angeles Kings Roman Cechmanek	To Philadelphia Flyers 2nd-rd pick - 2004 entry draft (CHI - # 41 - Bryan Bickell)^{1}
May 29, 2003	To Toronto Maple Leafs Jeff Daw	To Carolina Hurricanes future considerations
May 29, 2003	To Toronto Maple Leafs Harold Druken	To Carolina Hurricanes Allan Rourke
May 31, 2003	To Boston Bruins 5th-rd pick - 2004 entry draft (# 134 - Kris Versteeg)	To Phoenix Coyotes rights to Darren McLachlan

1. Philadelphia's acquired second-round pick went to Chicago as the result of a trade on February 19, 2004, that sent Alexei Zhamnov and a fourth-round pick in the 2004 Entry Draft to Philadelphia in exchange for Jim Vandermeer, the rights to Colin Fraser and this pick.

== June (Pre Draft Day) ==
June 1, 2003	To Montreal Canadiens 4th-rd pick - 2003 entry draft (# 123 - Dany Stewart); 7th-rd pick - 2003 entry draft (# 217 - Oskari Korpikari)	To Washington Capitals 4th-rd pick - 2003 entry draft (# 109 - Andreas Valdix)
June 20, 2003	To Washington Capitals 9th-rd pick - 2003 entry draft (# 279 - Mark Olafson)	To Ottawa Senators 9th-rd pick - 2004 entry draft (WAS - # 263 - Travis Morin)^{1}
June 20, 2003	To Boston Bruins 4th-rd pick - 2003 entry draft (# 129 -Patrik Valcak); 2nd-rd pick - 2004 entry draft (# 64 - Martins Karsums)	To Los Angeles Kings Jozef Stumpel; 7th-rd pick - 2003 entry draft (NAS - # 213 - Miroslav Hanuljak)^{2}

1. Washington's ninth-round pick was re-acquired as the result of a trade on October 5, 2003, that sent Denis Hamel to Ottawa in exchange for this pick.
2. Los Angeles' acquired seventh-round pick went to Nashville as the result of a trade on June 22, 2003, that sent a sixth-round pick in the 2003 entry draft to Los Angeles in exchange for a seventh-round pick (# 210 overall) in the 2003 entry draft and this pick.

== June (NHL Entry Draft - Day 1) ==
June 21, 2003	To Florida Panthers Mikael Samuelsson; 1st-rd pick - 2003 entry draft (# 3 - Nathan Horton); 2nd-rd pick - 2003 entry draft (# 55 - Stefan Meyer)	To Pittsburgh Penguins 1st-rd pick - 2003 entry draft (# 1 - Marc-Andre Fleury); 3rd-rd pick - 2003 entry draft (# 73 - Daniel Carcillo)
June 21, 2003	To Boston Bruins 1st-rd pick - 2003 entry draft (# 21 - Mark Stuart); 2nd-rd pick - 2003 entry draft (# 66 - Masi Marjamaki); 4th-rd pick - 2003 entry draft (# 107 - Byron Bitz)	To San Jose Sharks 1st-rd pick - 2003 entry draft (# 16 - Steve Bernier)
June 21, 2003	To New Jersey Devils 1st-rd pick - 2003 entry draft (# 17 - Zach Parise)	To Edmonton Oilers 1st-rd pick - 2003 entry draft (# 22 - Marc-Antoine Pouliot); 2nd-rd pick - 2003 entry draft (# 68 - Jean-Francois Jacques)
June 21, 2003	To Tampa Bay Lightning 2nd-rd pick - 2003 entry draft (# 34 - Mike Egener); 2nd-rd pick - 2003 entry draft (# 41 - Matt Smaby); 6th-rd pick - 2003 entry draft (# 192 - Doug O'Brien)	To Florida Panthers 1st-rd pick - 2003 entry draft (# 25 - Anthony Stewart)
June 21, 2003	To Dallas Stars 2nd-rd pick - 2003 entry draft (# 36 - Vojtech Polak); 2nd-rd pick - 2003 entry draft (# 54 - B.J. Crombeen)	To Mighty Ducks of Anaheim 1st-rd pick - 2003 entry draft (# 28 - Corey Perry)
June 21, 2003	To Florida Panthers 2nd-rd pick - 2003 entry draft (# 38 - Kamil Kreps)	To Atlanta Thrashers Ivan Majesky
June 21, 2003	To San Jose Sharks 2nd-rd pick - 2003 entry draft (# 43 - Josh Hennessy)	To New York Rangers 2nd-rd pick - 2003 entry draft (# 50 - Ivan Baranka); 3rd-rd pick - 2003 entry draft (# 75 - Ken Roche)
June 21, 2003	To San Jose Sharks 2nd-rd pick - 2003 entry draft (# 47 - Matt Carle)	To Calgary Flames 3rd-rd pick - 2003 entry draft (# 97 - Ryan Donally); 5th-rd pick - 2003 entry draft (# 143 - Greg Moore); 6th-rd pick - 2003 entry draft (# 173 - Tyler Johnson)
June 21, 2003	To St. Louis Blues 2nd-rd pick - 2003 entry draft (# 62 - David Backes)	To Tampa Bay Lightning Cory Stillman
June 21, 2003	To Toronto Maple Leafs 3rd-rd pick - 2003 entry draft (# 91 - Martin Sagat); 4th-rd pick - 2003 entry draft (# 125 - Konstantin Volkov)	To Minnesota Wild 3rd-rd pick - 2003 entry draft (# 78 - Danny Irmen)
June 21, 2003	To New Jersey Devils 3rd-rd pick - 2003 entry draft (# 93 - Ivan Khomutov)	To St. Louis Blues Mike Danton; 3rd-rd pick - 2003 entry draft (# 101 - Konstantin Zakharov)
June 21, 2003	To San Jose Sharks Scott Parker	To Colorado Avalanche 5th-rd pick - 2003 entry draft (# 163 - Brad Richardson)
June 21, 2003	To Nashville Predators Sergei Soin	To Colorado Avalanche Tomas Slovak
June 21, 2003	To Phoenix Coyotes Igor Knyazev; David Tanabe	To Calgary Flames Danny Markov conditional 4th-rd pick - 2004 entry draft^{1} (NYR - # 80 - Billy Ryan)^{2}
June 21, 2003	To Phoenix Coyotes Tyson Nash	To St. Louis Blues 5th-rd pick - 2003 entry draft (# 148 - Lee Stempniak) or 4th-rd pick - 2004 entry draft
June 21, 2003	To Chicago Blackhawks 4th-rd pick - 2004 entry draft (# 120 - Mitch Maunu)	To Colorado Avalanche Andrei Nikolishin

1. The condition of this pick was if Phoenix acquired a third-round pick in the 2004 entry draft before the start of the third round, the pick would be transferred to Carolina. It was converted on June 26, 2004, when Phoenix acquired a third-round pick in the 2004 entry draft from Edmonton.
2. Phoenix's acquired third-round pick went to the Rangers as the result of a trade on June 26, 2004, that sent a second-round pick (# 50 overall) in the 2004 entry draft to Phoenix in exchange for a second-round pick (# 60 overall) in the 2004 entry draft and this pick.
  Phoenix was re-acquired this pick as the result of a trade on June 26, 2004, that sent a third-round pick in the 2005 entry draft to Carolina in exchange for this pick.

== June (NHL Entry Draft - Day 2) ==
June 22, 2003	To Mighty Ducks of Anaheim 4th-rd pick - 2003 entry draft (# 119 - Nathan Saunders)	To Nashville Predators 4th-rd pick - 2004 entry draft (# 107 - Nick Fugere); 5th-rd pick - 2004 entry draft (# 139 - Kyle Moir)
June 22, 2003	To Columbus Blue Jackets 5th-rd pick - 2003 entry draft (# 138 - Arsi Piispanen); 6th-rd pick - 2003 entry draft (# 168 - Marc Methot)	To Carolina Hurricanes 4th-rd pick 2004 entry draft (CGY - # 121 - Kristopher Hogg)^{1}
June 22, 2003	To Los Angeles Kings 6th-rd pick - 2003 entry draft (# 174 - Esa Pirnes)	To Nashville Predators 7th-rd pick - 2003 entry draft (# 210 - Andrei Mukhachev); 7th-rd pick - 2003 entry draft (# 213 - Miroslav Hanuljak)
June 22, 2003	To San Jose Sharks pick returned to the Rangers^{2}	To New York Rangers 6th-rd pick 2003 entry draft (# 179 - Phillip Furrer)
June 22, 2003	To San Jose Sharks 7th-rd pick - 2003 entry draft (# 205 - Joe Pavelski)	To 3 team trade with Florida Panthers and Philadelphia Flyers
June 22, 2003	To Florida Panthers 7th-rd pick - 2003 entry draft (# 223 - Dany Roussin)	To 3 team trade with Philadelphia Flyers and San Jose Sharks
June 22, 2003	To Philadelphia Flyers 6th-rd pick - 2004 entry draft (# 170 - Ladislav Scurkd); 6th-rd pick - 2004 entry draft (TBL - # 191 - Karri Ramo)^{3}	To 3 team trade with San Jose Sharks and Florida Panthers
June 22, 2003	To Tampa Bay Lightning 8th-rd pick - 2003 entry draft (# 255 - Raimonds Danilics); 9th-rd pick - 2003 entry draft (# 286 - Zbynek Hrdel)	To Philadelphia Flyers 7th-rd pick 2004 entry draft (NYI - # 227 - Chris Campoli)^{4} 9th-rd pick - 2004 entry draft (# 291 - John Carter)
June 22, 2003	To San Jose Sharks 9th-rd pick - 2003 entry draft (# 276 - Carter Lee)	To Chicago Blackhawks 8th-rd pick - 2004 entry draft (# 256 - Matthew Ford)
June 22, 2003	To Los Angeles Kings 9th-rd pick 2004 entry draft (# 264 - Valtteri Tenkanen)	To Columbus Blue Jackets 9th-rd pick 2003 entry draft (# 283 - Trevor Hendrikx)
June 22, 2003	To Phoenix Coyotes 9th-rd pick - 2003 entry draft (# 290 - Loic Burkhalter)	To Dallas Stars 8th-rd pick - 2004 entry draft (PHI - # 232 - Martin Houle)^{5}
June 22, 2003	To Carolina Hurricanes Marty Murray	To Carolina Hurricanes 6th-rd pick - 2004 entry draft (# 171 - Frederik Cabana)

1. Carolina's acquired fourth-round pick went to Calgary as the result of a trade on July 16, 2003, that sent Bob Boughner to Carolina in exchange for a fifth-round pick in the 2005 entry draft and this pick.
2. San Jose's' acquired sixth-round pick was returned to the Rangers as the result of the conditions of this pick was subject to the completion of the future considerations part of the trade. The pick was returned when the Rangers sent the rights to Theo Fleury to San Jose to completed the trade on June 26, 2002.
3. Philadelphia's acquired sixth-round pick went to Tampa Bay as the result of a trade on June 27, 2004, that sent a third-round pick in the 2005 entry draft to Philadelphia in exchange for a fifth-round pick and a sixth-round pick (# 188 overall) in the 2004 Entry Draft and this pick.
4. Philadelphia's acquired seventh-round pick went to the Islanders as the result of a trade on January 22, 2004, that sent Mattias Timander to Philadelphia in exchange for this pick.
5. Dallas' acquired eight-round pick went to Philadelphia as the result of a trade on March 8, 2004, that sent Chris Therien to Dallas in exchange for a third-round pick in the 2005 entry draft and this pick.

== June (Post Draft Day) ==
June 26, 2003	To Nashville Predators Chris Bala	To Ottawa Senators Peter Smrek
June 26, 2003	To Minnesota Wild Chris Bala	To Nashville Predators Curtis Murphy
June 27, 2003	To Buffalo Sabres Andy Delmore	To Nashville Predators 3rd-rd pick - 2004 entry draft (MIN - # 79 - Clayton Stoner)^{1}
June 30, 2002	To San Jose Sharks rights to Mark Messier	To New York Rangers 4th-rd pick - 2004 entry draft (# 127 - Ryan Callahan)
June 30, 2002	To Edmonton Oilers rights to Brian Leetch	To New York Rangers Jussi Markkanen; 4th-rd pick - 2004 entry draft (TOR - # 113 - Roman Kukumberg)^{2}
June 30, 2002	To Nashville Predators 3rd-rd pick - 2004 entry draft (OTT - # 87 - Peter Regin)^{3}	To Colorado Avalanche Kārlis Skrastiņš
June 30, 2002	To Washington Capitals rights to Dmitry Yushkevich	To Philadelphia Flyers conditional pick - 2004 entry draft^{4}

1. Nashville's acquired third-round pick went to Minnesota as the result of a trade on March 5, 2004, that sent Sergei Zholtok and Brad Bombardir to Nashville in exchange for a fourth-round pick in the 2004 entry draft and this pick.
2. The Rangers' acquired fourth-round pick went to Toronto as the result of a trade on March 3, 2004, that sent Maxim Kondratyev, Jarkko Immonen, a first-round pick in the 2004 Entry Draft and a second-round pick in the 2005 entry draft to the Rangers in exchange for Brian Leetch and a conditional draft pick in the 2004 Entry Draft (this pick). The Conditions of this pick are unknown.
3. Nashville's acquired third-round pick went to Ottawa as the result of a trade on March 9, 2004, that sent Shane Hnidy to Nashville in exchange for this pick.
4. Conditions of this pick are unknown and was not exercised.

== July ==
July 3, 2003	To Buffalo Sabres Steven Reinprecht; Rhett Warrener	To Colorado Avalanche Keith Ballard
July 3, 2003	To Buffalo Sabres Steve Begin; Chris Drury	To Calgary Flames Steven Reinprecht; Rhett Warrener
July 14, 2003	To Nashville Predators Mike Farrell	To Washington Capitals Alexander Riazantsev
July 16, 2003	To Calgary Flames 4th-rd pick 2004 entry draft (# 121 - Kristopher Hogg); 5th-rd pick 2005 entry draft (# 128 - Kevin Lalande)	To Carolina Hurricanes Bob Boughner
July 18, 2003	To Colorado Avalanche Peter Worrell; 2nd-rd pick - 2004 entry draft (FLA - # 37 - David Shantz)^{1}	To Florida Panthers Eric Messier; Vaclav Nedorost
July 22, 2003	To Dallas Stars Mike Sillinger; 2nd-rd pick - 2004 entry draft (# 34 - Johan Fransson)	To Columbus Blue Jackets Darryl Sydor
July 22, 2003	To Phoenix Coyotes Mike Sillinger conditional draft pick^{2}	To Dallas Stars Teppo Numminen
July 25, 2003	To Phoenix Coyotes Bryan Helmer	To Vancouver Canucks Martin Grenier

1. Florida's second-round pick was re-acquired as the result of a trade on June 26, 2004, that sent a second-round pick (# 50 overall) and a third-round pick in the 2004 Entry Draft to the Rangers in exchange for this pick.
  The Rangers previously acquired this pick as the result of a trade on March 8, 2004, that sent Matthew Barnaby and a third-round pick in the 2004 Entry Draft to Colorado in exchange for Chris McAllister, David Liffiton and this pick.
2. Conditions of this draft pick are unknown.

== August ==
August 12, 2003	To San Jose Sharks Nils Ekman	To New York Rangers Chad Wiseman
August 12, 2003	To Mighty Ducks of Anaheim future considerations	To Colorado Avalanche Travis Brigley
August 25, 2003	To Vancouver Canucks Johan Hedberg	To Pittsburgh Penguins 2nd-rd pick 2004 entry draft (# 61 - Alex Goligoski)

== September ==
September 10, 2003	To Florida Panthers 9th-rd pick 2004 entry draft (# 283 - Luke Beaverson)	To Ottawa Senators Serge Payer
September 15, 2003	To Los Angeles Kings Milan Hnilicka	To Atlanta Thrashers future considerations

== October ==
October 3, 2003	To Atlanta Thrashers Jani Hurme	To Carolina Hurricanes 4th-round pick - 2004 entry draft (# 109 - Brett Carson)
October 3, 2003	To Boston Bruins Travis Green	To Columbus Blue Jackets 6th-rd pick - 2004 entry draft (# 190 - Lennart Petrell)
October 5, 2003	To Ottawa Senators Denis Hamel	To Washington Capitals 9th-rd pick - 2004 entry draft (# 263 - Travis Morin)
October 5, 2003	To Florida Panthers Steve Shields	To Boston Bruins future considerations
October 22, 2003	To Colorado Avalanche Steve Konowalchuk; 3rd-rd pick - 2004 entry draft (CAR - # 69 - Casey Borer)^{1}	To Washington Capitals Bates Battaglia rights to Jonas Johansson
October 27, 2003	To St. Louis Blues Erkki Rajamaki	To Tampa Bay Lightning 8th-rd pick - 2004 entry draft (# 245 - Justin Keller)
October 30, 2003	To Vancouver Canucks Sean Pronger	To Columbus Blue Jackets Zenith Komarniski

1. Colorado's acquired third-round pick went to Carolina as the result of a trade on February 20, 2004, that sent Bob Boughner to Colorado in exchange for Chris Bahen, a fifth-round pick in the 2005 entry draft and this pick.

== November ==
November 16, 2003	To Calgary Flames Miikka Kiprusoff	To San Jose Sharks conditional pick - 2005 entry draft (2nd-rd - # 35 - Marc-Edouard Vlasic)^{1}
November 17, 2003	To Chicago Blackhawks Stephane Robidas; 2nd-rd pick - 2004 entry draft (# 54 - Jakub Sindel)	To Dallas Stars Jon Klemm; 4th-rd pick - 2004 entry draft (# 104 - Fredrik Naslund)
November 30, 2003	To Los Angeles Kings Martin Straka	To Pittsburgh Penguins Martin Strbak right to Sergei Anshakov

1. Conditions of this draft pick are unknown.

== December ==
December 2, 2003	To Nashville Predators Simon Gamache; Kirill Safronov	To Atlanta Thrashers Tomas Kloucek; Ben Simon
December 9, 2003	To Phoenix Coyotes Chris Dyment	To Minnesota Wild Michael Schutte
December 16, 2003	To Philadelphia Flyers Mike Comrie	To Edmonton Oilers Jeff Woywitka; 1st-rd pick - 2004 entry draft (# 25 - Rob Schremp); 3rd-rd pick - 2005 entry draft (# 81 - Danny Syvret)
December 17, 2003	To Vancouver Canucks Wade Brookbank	To Nashville Predators future considerations
December 17, 2003	To Minnesota Wild Eric Chouinard	To Philadelphia Flyers 5th-rd pick - 2004 entry draft (# 144 - Chris Zarb)
December 29, 2003	To Florida Panthers Wade Brookbank	To Ottawa Senators future considerations
December 30, 2003	To Phoenix Coyotes Ivan Novoseltsev	To Florida Panthers future considerations
December 31, 2003	To Atlanta Thrashers Jean-Luc Grand-Pierre	To Florida Panthers future considerations

== January ==
January 6, 2004	To Ottawa Senators Brad Tapper	To Atlanta Thrashers Daniel Corso
January 9, 2004	To Calgary Flames Lynn Loyns	To San Jose Sharks 5th-rd pick - 2004 entry draft (FLO - # 152 - Bret Nasby)^{1}
January 17, 2004	To Phoenix Coyotes Todd Reirden	To Mighty Ducks of Anaheim future considerations
January 17, 2004	To Boston Bruins Jiri Slegr	To Vancouver Canucks future considerations
January 20, 2004	To Philadelphia Flyers Danny Markov	To Carolina Hurricanes Justin Williams
January 22, 2004	To Philadelphia Flyers Mattias Timander	To New York Islanders 7th-rd pick - 2004 entry draft (# 227 - Chris Campoli)
January 23, 2004	To New York Rangers Jamie Pushor	To Columbus Blue Jackets 8th-rd pick - 2004 entry draft (# 233 - Matt Greer)
January 23, 2004	To Ottawa Senators Charlie Stephens	To Colorado Avalanche Dennis Bonvie
January 23, 2004	To New York Rangers Jaromir Jagr	To Washington Capitals Anson Carter
January 27, 2004	To Tampa Bay Lightning Darryl Sydor; 4th-rd pick - 2004 entry draft (# 102 - Mike Lundin)	To Columbus Blue Jackets Alexander Svitov; 3rd-rd pick - 2004 entry draft (CGY - # 98 - Dustin Boyd)^{2}

1. San Jose's acquired fifth-round pick went to Florida as the result of a trade on June 27, 2004, that sent a seventh-round pick and an eighth-round pick in the 2004 entry draft to San Jose in exchange for this pick.
2. Columbus' acquired third-round pick went to Calgary as the result of a trade on June 26, 2004, that sent a second-round pick in the 2004 entry draft to Columbus in exchange for a third-round pick (# 70 overall) in the 2004 entry draft and this pick.

== February ==
February 4, 2004	To Ottawa Senators Todd Simpson	To Mighty Ducks of Anaheim Petr Schastlivy
February 8, 2004	To St. Louis Blues Eric Weinrich	To Philadelphia Flyers 5th-rd pick - 2004 entry draft (# 149 - Gino Pisellini)
February 9, 2004	To Phoenix Coyotes Mike Comrie	To Philadelphia Flyers Sean Burke; Branko Radivojevic rights to Ben Eager
February 10, 2004	To Pittsburgh Penguins Pauli Levokari	To Columbus Blue Jackets Brendan Buckley
February 11, 2004	To Toronto Maple Leafs Drake Berehowsky	To Pittsburgh Penguins Ric Jackman
February 16, 2004	To Dallas Stars Mike Siklenka	To Philadelphia Flyers Steve Gainey
February 16, 2004	To Nashville Predators Steve Sullivan	To Chicago Blackhawks 2nd-rd pick - 2004 entry draft (# 45 - Ryan Garlock); 2nd-rd pick - 2005 entry draft (# 43 - Michael Blunden)
February 16, 2004	To Vancouver Canucks Peter Sarno	To Edmonton Oilers Tyler Moss
February 18, 2004	To Ottawa Senators Peter Bondra	To Washington Capitals Brooks Laich; 2nd-rd pick - 2005 entry draft (COL - # 52 - Chris Durand)^{1}
February 19, 2004	To Philadelphia Flyers Alexei Zhamnov; 4th-rd pick - 2004 entry draft (# 52 - R.J. Anderson)	To Chicago Blackhawks Jim Vandermeer rights to Colin Fraser; 2nd-rd pick - 2004 entry draft (# 41 - Bryan Bickell)
February 20, 2004	To Colorado Avalanche Bob Boughner	To Carolina Hurricanes Chris Bahen; 3rd-rd pick - 2004 entry draft (# 69 - Casey Borer); 5th-rd pick - 2005 entry draft (# 159 - Risto Korhonen)
February 21, 2004	To Colorado Avalanche Kurt Sauer; 4th-rd pick - 2005 entry draft (# 124 - Raymond Macias)	To Mighty Ducks of Anaheim Martin Skoula
February 22, 2004	To Pittsburgh Penguins Landon Wilson	To Phoenix Coyotes future considerations
February 24, 2004	To Calgary Flames Ville Nieminen	To Chicago Blackhawks Jason Morgan conditional pick - 2005 entry draft (6th-rd - # 167 - Joe Fallon)^{2}
February 25, 2004	To Colorado Avalanche Darby Hendrickson; 8th-rd pick - 2004 entry draft (# 239 - Brandon Yip)	To Minnesota Wild 4th-rd pick - 2005 entry draft (OTT - # 95 - Cody Bass)^{3}
February 25, 2004	To Tampa Bay Lightning Timo Helbling	To Nashville Predators 8th-rd pick - 2004 entry draft (# 258 - Pekka Rinne)
February 27, 2004	To Detroit Red Wings Robert Lang	To Washington Capitals Tomas Fleischmann; Capitals' option of a 1st-rd pick – 2004 entry draft (# 29 – Mike Green) or 2005 entry draft 4th-rd pick – 2006 entry draft (# 122 – Luke Lynes)

1. Washington's acquired second-round pick went to Colorado as the result of a trade on July 30, 2005, that sent a first-round pick in the 2005 entry draft to Washington in exchange for a second-round pick (# 47 overall) in the 2005 entry draft and this pick.
2. The conditions of this draft pick are unknown.
3. Minnesota's acquired fourth-round pick went to Ottawa as the result of a trade on July 30, 2005, that sent Todd White to Minnesota in exchange for this pick.

== March ==
March 1, 2004	To New Jersey Devils Viktor Kozlov	To Florida Panthers Christian Berglund; Victor Uchevatov
March 2, 2004	To Montreal Canadiens Alexei Kovalev	To New York Rangers Jozef Balej; 2nd-rd pick - 2004 entry draft (# 51 - Bruce Graham)
March 2, 2004	To Florida Panthers Ty Jones	To Chicago Blackhawks future considerations
March 2, 2004	To Los Angeles Kings Nathan Dempsey	To Chicago Blackhawks 4th-rd pick - 2005 entry draft (# 113 - Nathan Davis) future considerations
March 3, 2004	To San Jose Sharks Jason Marshall	To Minnesota Wild 5th-rd pick - 2004 entry draft (# 161 - Jean-Claude Sawyer)
March 3, 2004	To Toronto Maple Leafs Brian Leetch conditional pick - 2004 entry draft (4th-rd - # 113 - Roman Kukumberg)^{1}	To New York Rangers Maxim Kondratiev; Jarkko Immonen; 1st-rd pick - 2004 entry draft (CGY - # 24 - Kris Chucko)^{2} 2nd-rd pick - 2005 entry draft (# 40 - Michael Sauer)
March 3, 2004	To Edmonton Oilers Petr Nedved; Jussi Markkanen	To New York Rangers Dwight Helminen; Stephen Valiquette; 2nd-rd pick - 2004 entry draft (# 48 - Dane Byers)
March 3, 2004	To Boston Bruins Sergei Gonchar	To Washington Capitals Shaone Morrisonn; 1st-rd pick - 2004 entry draft (# 27 - Jeff Schultz); 2nd-rd pick - 2004 entry draft (# 62 - Mikhail Yunkov)
March 4, 2004	To Montreal Canadiens Jim Dowd	To Minnesota Wild 4th-rd pick - 2004 entry draft (# 117 - Julien Sprunger)
March 4, 2004	To Phoenix Coyotes Brent Johnson	To St. Louis Blues Mike Sillinger
March 4, 2004	To Boston Bruins Michael Nylander	To Washington Capitals 2nd-rd pick - 2006 entry draft (# 35 - Francois Bouchard) future considerations (4th-rd pick - 2005 entry draft # 118 - Patrick McNeill)^{3}
March 5, 2004	To Nashville Predators Sergei Zholtok; Brad Bombardir	To Minnesota Wild 3rd-rd pick - 2004 entry draft (# 79 - Clayton Stoner); 4th-rd pick - 2004 entry draft (# 114 - Patrick Bordeleau)
March 5, 2004	To New Jersey Devils Jan Hrdina	To Phoenix Coyotes Michael Rupp; 2nd-rd pick - 2004 entry draft (EDM - # 57 - Geoff Paukovich)^{4}
March 6, 2004	To Calgary Flames Chris Simon; 7th-rd pick - 2004 entry draft (# 200 - Matt Schneider)	To New York Rangers Jamie McLennan; Blair Betts; Greg Moore
March 8, 2004	To Buffalo Sabres Brad Brown; 6th-rd pick - 2005 entry draft (# 191 - Vyacheslav Buravchikov)	To Minnesota Wild 4th-rd pick - 2005 entry draft (# 110 - Kyle Bailey)
March 8, 2004	To Florida Panthers Kamil Piros	To Atlanta Thrashers Kyle Rossiter
March 8, 2004	To Dallas Stars Chris Therien	To Philadelphia Flyers 8th-rd pick - 2004 entry draft (# 232 - Martin Houle); 3rd-rd pick - 2005 entry draft (TBL - # 89 - Chris Lawrence)^{5}
March 8, 2004	To Dallas Stars Valeri Bure	To Florida Panthers Drew Bagnall; 2nd-rd pick - 2004 entry draft (PHO - # 50 - Enver Lisin)^{6}
March 8, 2004	To Colorado Avalanche Matthew Barnaby; 3rd-rd pick - 2004 entry draft (# 72 - Denis Parshin)	To New York Rangers Chris McAllister rights to David Liffiton; 2nd-rd pick - 2004 entry draft (FLO - # 37 - David Shantz)^{7}
March 8, 2004	To Philadelphia Flyers Vladimir Malakhov	To New York Rangers Rick Kozak; 2nd-rd pick - 2005 entry draft (ATL - # 37 - Ondrej Pavelec)^{8}
March 8, 2004	To New York Islanders Steve Webb	To Pittsburgh Penguins Alain Nasreddine
March 8, 2004	To Calgary Flames Marcus Nilson	To Florida Panthers 2nd-rd pick - 2004 entry draft (# 53 - David Booth)
March 8, 2004	To Colorado Avalanche Tommy Salo; 6th-rd pick - 2005 entry draft (# 168 - Justin Mercier)	To Edmonton Oilers Tom Gilbert
March 8, 2004	To Los Angeles Kings Anson Carter	To Washington Capitals Jared Aulin
March 8, 2004	To Colorado Avalanche Chris Gratton; Ossi Vaananen; 2nd-rd pick - 2005 entry draft (# 44 - Paul Stastny)	To Phoenix Coyotes Derek Morris; Keith Ballard

1. The conditions of this draft pick are unknown.
2. The Rangers' acquired first-round pick went to Calgary as the result of a trade on June 25, 2004, that sent a first-round pick (# 19 overall) and an eighth-round pick in the 2004 entry draft to the Rangers in exchange for a second-round pick in the 2004 entry draft and this pick.
3. Trade completed on July 30, 2005.
4. Phoenix's acquired second-round pick went to Edmonton as the result of a trade on June 26, 2004, that sent Jason Chimera and a third-round pick in the 2004 entry draft to Phoenix in exchange for a fourth-round pick in the 2004 entry draft and this pick.
5. Philadelphia's acquired third-round pick went to Tampa Bay as the result of a trade on July 30, 2005, that sent a second-round pick in the 2006 entry draft to Philadelphia in exchange for a fourth-round pick in the 2005 entry draft and this pick.
6. The Rangers' acquired second-round pick went to Phoenix as the result of a trade on June 26, 2004, that sent a second-round pick (# 60 overall) and a third-round pick in the 2004 entry draft to the Rangers in exchange for this pick.
  The Rangers previously acquired this pick as the result of a trade on June 26, 2004, that sent a second-round pick (# 37 overall) in the 2004 entry draft to Florida in exchange for a third-round pick in the 2004 entry draft and this pick.
7. Florida's second-round pick was re-acquired as the result of a trade on June 26, 2004, that sent a second-round pick (# 50 overall) and a third-round pick in the 2004 Entry Draft to the Rangers in exchange for this pick.
8. The Rangers' acquired second-round pick went to Atlanta as the result of a trade on July 30, 2005, that sent a first-round pick (# 12 overall) in the 2005 entry draft to the Rangers in exchange for a first-round pick (# 16 overall) in the 2005 entry draft and this pick.

== March 9 – Trade deadline ==
March 9, 2004	To Colorado Avalanche Chris Bala	To Minnesota Wild Jordan Krestanovich
March 9, 2004	To Atlanta Thrashers Kip Brennan	To Los Angeles Kings Jeff Cowan
March 9, 2004	To Boston Bruins Brad Boyes	To San Jose Sharks Jeff Jillson
March 9, 2004	To Buffalo Sabres Jeff Jillson; 9th-rd pick - 2005 entry draft (7th-rd - # 227 - Andrew Orpik)^{1}	To San Jose Sharks Curtis Brown; Andy Delmore
March 9, 2004	To Boston Bruins Andy Delmore	To San Jose Sharks future considerations
March 9, 2004	To Nashville Predators Shane Hnidy	To Ottawa Senators 3rd-rd pick - 2004 entry draft (# 87 - Peter Regin)
March 9, 2004	To Ottawa Senators Greg de Vries	To New York Rangers Karel Rachunek; Alexandre Giroux
March 9, 2004	To Buffalo Sabres Mike Grier	To Washington Capitals Jakub Kepis
March 9, 2004	To Vancouver Canucks Martin Rucinsky	To New York Rangers Martin Grenier rights to R.J. Umberger
March 9, 2004	To Florida Panthers Paul Healey	To New York Rangers Jeff Paul
March 9, 2004	To Tampa Bay Lightning Stanislav Neckar	To Nashville Predators 6th-rd pick - 2004 entry draft (# 193 - Kevin Schaeffer)
March 9, 2004	To Columbus Blue Jackets Brian Holzinger	To Pittsburgh Penguins Lasse Pirjeta
March 9, 2004	To Vancouver Canucks Marc Bergevin	To Pittsburgh Penguins 7th-rd pick - 2004 entry draft (# 222 - Jordan Morrison)
March 9, 2004	To Toronto Maple Leafs Ron Francis	To Carolina Hurricanes 4th-rd pick - 2005 entry draft (CBJ - # 101 - Jared Boll)^{2}
March 9, 2004	To New York Islanders Alexander Karpovtsev	To Chicago Blackhawks 4th-rd pick - 2005 entry draft (# 108 - Niklas Hjalmarsson)
March 9, 2004	To Phoenix Coyotes Tom Koivisto	To St. Louis Blues future considerations
March 9, 2004	To St. Louis Blues Brian Savage	To Phoenix Coyotes future considerations
March 9, 2004	To Vancouver Canucks Geoff Sanderson	To Columbus Blue Jackets 3rd-rd pick - 2004 entry draft (# 93 - Dan LaCosta)
March 9, 2004	To Vancouver Canucks Sergei Varlamov	To St. Louis Blues Ryan Ready
March 9, 2004	To Montreal Canadiens Rene Vydareny	To Vancouver Canucks Sylvain Blouin

1. The ninth-round pick became a seventh-round pick in the 2005 entry draft after the NHL eliminated the eighth and ninth rounds of the draft.
2. Carolina's acquired fourth-round pick went to Columbus as the result of a trade on July 30, 2005, that sent Derrick Walser and a fourth-round pick in the 2006 entry draft to Carolina in exchange for this pick.

=== June ===
The 2004 NHL entry draft was held on June 26–27, 2004.

June 16, 2004	To Columbus Blue Jackets Arturs Irbe	To Carolina Hurricanes future considerations
June 18, 2004	To Mighty Ducks of Anaheim Tomas Malec; 3rd-round pick in 2004 (#74 - Kyle Klubertanz)	To Carolina Hurricanes Martin Gerber
June 25, 2004	To Dallas Stars rights to Shawn Belle	To St. Louis Blues Jason Bacashihua
June 25, 2004	To Calgary Flames 1st-round pick in 2004 (#24 - Kris Chucko); 2nd-round pick in 2004 (CBJ - #46 - Adam Pineault)^{1}	To New York Rangers 1st-round pick in 2004 (#19 - Lauri Korpikoski); 8th-round pick in 2004 (#263 - Jonathan Paiement)
June 26, 2004	To Columbus Blue Jackets 1st-round pick in 2004 (#8 - Alexandre Picard); 2nd-round pick in 2004 (#59 - Kyle Wharton)	To Carolina Hurricanes 1st-round pick in 2004 (#4 - Andrew Ladd)
June 26, 2004	To New Jersey Devils 1st-round pick in 2004 (#20 - Travis Zajac)	To Dallas Stars 1st-round pick in 2004 (SJS - #22 - Lukas Kaspar)^{1} 3rd-round pick in 2004 (WSH - #88 - Clayton Barthel)^{2}
June 26, 2004	To San Jose Sharks 1st-round pick in 2004 (#22 - Lukas Kaspar); 5th-round pick in 2004 (#153 - Steven Zalewski)	To Dallas Stars 1st-round pick in 2004 (#28 - Mark Fistric); 2nd-round pick in 2004 (#52 - Raymond Sawada); 3rd-round pick in 2004 (VAN - #91 - Alexander Edler)^{3}
June 26, 2004	To Florida Panthers 2nd-round pick in 2004 (#37 - David Shantz)	To New York Rangers 2nd-round pick in 2004 (PHX - #50 - Enver Lisin)^{4} 3rd-round pick in 2004 (#73 - Zdenek Bahensky)
June 26, 2004	To Calgary Flames 3rd-round pick in 2004 (#70 - Brandon Prust); 3rd-round pick in 2004 (#98 - Dustin Boyd)	To Columbus Blue Jackets 2nd-round pick in 2004 (#46 - Adam Pineault)
June 26, 2004	To Phoenix Coyotes Jason Chimera; 3rd-round pick in 2004 (NYR - #80 - Billy Ryan)^{5}	To Edmonton Oilers 2nd-round pick in 2004 (#57 - Geoff Paukovich); 4th-round pick in 2004 (#112 - Liam Reddox)
June 26, 2004	To Phoenix Coyotes 3rd-round pick in 2004 (NYR - #80 - Billy Ryan)^{6}	To Carolina Hurricanes 3rd-round pick in 2004 (NSH - #78 - Teemu Laakso)^{7}
June 26, 2004	To Phoenix Coyotes 2nd-round pick in 2004 (#50 - Enver Lisin)	To New York Rangers 2nd-round pick in 2004 (#60 - Brandon Dubinsky); 3rd-round pick in 2004 (#80 - Billy Ryan)
June 26, 2004	To Boston Bruins 2nd-round pick in 2004 (#63 - David Krejci)	To San Jose Sharks 3rd-round pick in 2004 (#94 - Thomas Greiss); 4th-round pick in 2004 (#129 - Jason Churchill); 9th-round pick in 2004 (#288 - Brian Mahoney-Wilson)
June 26, 2004	To Los Angeles Kings Radek Bonk	To Ottawa Senators 3rd-round pick in 2004 (#77 - Shawn Weller)
June 26, 2004	To Dallas Stars 3rd-round pick in 2005 (#75 - Perttu Lindgren)	To Washington Capitals 3rd-round pick in 2004 (#88 - Clayton Barthel)
June 26, 2004	To Dallas Stars 3rd-round pick in 2005 (#71 - Richard Clune)	To Vancouver Canucks 3rd-round pick in 2004 (#91 - Alexander Edler)
June 26, 2004	To Montreal Canadiens Radek Bonk; Cristobal Huet	To Los Angeles Kings Mathieu Garon; 3rd-round pick in 2004 (#95 - Paul Baier)
June 26, 2004	To Carolina Hurricanes 3rd-round pick in 2005 (CGY - #69 - Gord Baldwin)^{8}	To Atlanta Thrashers 4th-round pick in 2004 (#106 - Chad Painchaud)
June 26, 2004	To Mighty Ducks of Anaheim Kurtis Foster	To Atlanta Thrashers Niclas Havelid
June 27, 2004	To San Jose Sharks 7th-round pick in 2004 (#201 - Michael Vernace); 8th-round pick in 2004 (#234 - Derek MacIntyre)	To Florida Panthers 5th-round pick in 2004 (#152 - Bret Nasby)
June 27, 2004	To Tampa Bay Lightning 5th-round pick in 2004 (#158 - Brandon Elliott); 6th-round pick in 2004 (#188 - Jan Zapletal); 6th-round pick in 2004 (#191 - Karri Ramo)	To Philadelphia Flyers 3rd-round pick in 2005 (#91 - Oskars Bartulis)
June 27, 2004	To Los Angeles Kings 8th-round pick in 2005 (7th-round - #226 - John Seymour)^{1}	To Columbus Blue Jackets 9th-round pick in 2004 (#271 - Grant Clitsome)
June 27, 2004	To Chicago Blackhawks future considerations (7th-round pick in 2005 #203 - Adam Hobson)^{2}	To Atlanta Thrashers Adam Berkhoel
June 27, 2004	To St. Louis Blues Patrick Lalime	To Ottawa Senators 4th-round pick in 2005 (#98 - Ilya Zubov)
June 27, 2004	To Montreal Canadiens future considerations	To Los Angeles Kings rights to Stephane Quintal
June 29, 2004	To Dallas Stars Jaroslav Svoboda	To Carolina Hurricanes 4th-round pick in 2005 (#94 - Jakub Vojta)

1. Calgary's acquired second-round pick went to Columbus as the result of a trade on June 26, 2004, that sent two third-round picks (#70 & 98 overall) in 2004 the entry draft to Calgary in exchange for this pick.
2. Dallas' acquired first-round pick went to San Jose as the result of a trade on June 26, 2004, that sent a first-round pick (#28 overall), a second-round pick and a third-round pick in the 2004 entry draft to Dallas in exchange for a fifth-round pick in the 2004 entry draft and this pick.
3. Dallas' acquired third-round pick went to Washington as the result of a trade on June 26, 2004, that sent a third-round pick in the 2005 entry draft to Dallas in exchange for this pick.
4. Dallas' acquired third-round pick went to Vancouver as the result of a trade on June 26, 2004, that sent a third-round pick in the 2005 entry draft to Dallas in exchange for this pick.
5. The Rangers' acquired second-round pick went to Phoenix as the result of a trade on June 26, 2004, that sent a second-round pick (#60 overall) and a third-round pick in the 2004 entry draft to the Rangers in exchange for this pick.
6. Phoenix's acquired third-round pick went to the Rangers as the result of a trade on June 26, 2004, that sent a second-round pick (#50 overall) in the 2004 entry draft to Phoenix in exchange for a second-round pick (#60 overall) in the 2004 entry draft and this pick.
  Phoenix was re-acquired this pick as the result of a trade on June 26, 2004, that sent a third-round pick in the 2005 entry draft to Carolina in exchange for this pick.
  Carolina previously acquired this pick as the result of a trade on June 21, 2003, that sent David Tanabe and Igor Knyazev to Phoenix in exchange for Danny Markov and this pick (being conditional at the time of the trade). The condition – If Phoenix acquired a third-round pick in the 2004 entry draft before the start of the third round, the pick would be transferred to Carolina. It was converted on June 26, 2004, when Phoenix acquired a third-round pick in the 2004 entry draft from Edmonton.
7. Phoenix's acquired third-round pick went to the Rangers as the result of a trade on June 26, 2004, that sent a second-round pick (#50 overall) in the 2004 entry draft to Phoenix in exchange for a second-round pick (#60 overall) in the 2004 entry draft and this pick.
8. Carolina's acquired third-round pick went to Nashville as the result of a trade on July 29, 2005, that sent Andrew Hutchinson to Carolina in exchange for this pick.
9. Carolina's acquired third-round pick went to Calgary as the result of a trade on July 29, 2005, that sent Mike Commodore to Carolina in exchange for this pick.
10. The eighth-round pick became a seventh-round pick in the 2005 entry draft after the NHL eliminated the eighth and ninth rounds of the draft.
11. Trade completed on July 30, 2005.

== See also ==
- 2003 NHL entry draft
- 2003 in sports
- 2004 in sports
