= 2003–04 Nashville Predators season =

Professional ice hockey team season

2003–04 Nashville Predators
- Division: 3rd Central
- Conference: 8th Western
- 2003–04 record: 38–29–11–4
- Home record: 22–10–7–2
- Road record: 16–19–4–2
- Goals for: 216
- Goals against: 217

Team information
- General manager: David Poile
- Coach: Barry Trotz
- Captain: Greg Johnson
- Alternate captains: Kimmo Timonen; Scott Walker
- Arena: Gaylord Entertainment Center
- Average attendance: 13,157
- Minor league affiliates: Milwaukee Admirals; Toledo Storm

Team leaders
- Goals: Scott Walker (25)
- Assists: Scott Walker (42)
- Points: Scott Walker (67)
- Penalty minutes: Jordin Tootoo (137)
- Plus/minus: Mark Eaton (+16)
- Wins: Tomas Vokoun (34)
- Goals against average: Tomas Vokoun (2.53)

The 2003–04 Nashville Predators season was the Nashville Predators' sixth season in the National Hockey League (NHL). The team qualified for the Stanley Cup playoffs for the first time in franchise history, losing to the Detroit Red Wings in the first round.

== Regular season ==
The Predators had the most power-play opportunities of all 30 teams in the League, with 428.

=== Final standings ===
Central Division
No.	CR		GP	W	L	T	OTL	GF	GA	Pts
1	1	**Detroit Red Wings**	82	48	21	11	2	255	189	109
2	7	**St. Louis Blues**	82	39	30	11	2	191	198	91
3	8	**Nashville Predators**	82	38	29	11	4	216	217	91
4	14	Columbus Blue Jackets	82	25	45	8	4	177	238	62
5	15	Chicago Blackhawks	82	20	43	11	8	188	259	59

Note: CR = Conference rank; GP = Games played; W = Wins; L = Losses; T = Ties; OTL = Overtime loss; GF = Goals for; GA = Goals against; Pts = Points
Bolded teams qualified for the playoffs.

Western Conference
R		Div	GP	W	L	T	OTL	GF	GA	Pts
**1**	**P-** Detroit Red Wings	**CE**	**82**	**48**	**21**	**11**	**2**	**255**	**189**	109
**2**	**Y-** San Jose Sharks	**PA**	**82**	**43**	**21**	**12**	**6**	**255**	**183**	104
**3**	**Y-** Vancouver Canucks	**NW**	**82**	**43**	**24**	**10**	**5**	**235**	**194**	101
**4**	**X-** Colorado Avalanche	**NW**	**82**	**40**	**22**	**13**	**7**	**236**	**198**	100
**5**	**X-** Dallas Stars	**PA**	**82**	**41**	**26**	**13**	**2**	**194**	**175**	97
**6**	**X-** Calgary Flames	**NW**	**82**	**42**	**30**	**7**	**3**	**200**	**176**	94
**7**	**X-** St. Louis Blues	**CE**	**82**	**39**	**30**	**11**	**2**	**191**	**198**	91
**8**	**X-** Nashville Predators	**CE**	**82**	**38**	**29**	**11**	**4**	**216**	**217**	91
8.5
9	Edmonton Oilers	NW	82	36	29	12	5	221	208	89
10	Minnesota Wild	NW	82	30	29	20	3	188	183	83
11	Los Angeles Kings	PA	82	28	29	16	9	205	217	81
12	Mighty Ducks of Anaheim	PA	82	29	35	10	8	184	213	76
13	Phoenix Coyotes	PA	82	22	36	18	6	188	245	68
14	Columbus Blue Jackets	CE	82	25	45	8	4	177	238	62
15	Chicago Blackhawks	CE	82	20	43	11	8	188	259	59

Divisions: CE – Central, PA – Pacific, NW – Northwest

P – Clinched Presidents Trophy; Y – Clinched division; X – Clinched playoff spot

== Schedule and results ==
=== Regular season ===
2003–04 regular season
October: 4–5–0–0 (home: 4–2–0–0; road: 0–3–0–0)

Game	Date	Score	Opponent	Record	Recap
1	October 9, 2003	3–1	Mighty Ducks of Anaheim (2003–04)	1–0–0–0	W
2	October 11, 2003	1–3	Dallas Stars (2003–04)	1–1–0–0	L
3	October 16, 2003	4–1	St. Louis Blues (2003–04)	2–1–0–0	W
4	October 18, 2003	3–2	Columbus Blue Jackets (2003–04)	3–1–0–0	W
5	October 19, 2003	1–3	@ Chicago Blackhawks (2003–04)	3–2–0–0	L
6	October 23, 2003	2–4	@ Atlanta Thrashers (2003–04)	3–3–0–0	L
7	October 25, 2003	3–5	Colorado Avalanche (2003–04)	3–4–0–0	L
8	October 28, 2003	0–1	@ St. Louis Blues (2003–04)	3–5–0–0	L
9	October 30, 2003	5–3	Detroit Red Wings (2003–04)	4–5–0–0	W

November: 8–5–1–0 (home: 4–2–1–0; road: 4–3–0–0)

Game	Date	Score	Opponent	Record	Recap
10	November 1, 2003	1–1 OT	Dallas Stars (2003–04)	4–5–1–0	T
11	November 2, 2003	3–7	@ Dallas Stars (2003–04)	4–6–1–0	L
12	November 5, 2003	3–4	Vancouver Canucks (2003–04)	4–7–1–0	L
13	November 7, 2003	1–2	Chicago Blackhawks (2003–04)	4–8–1–0	L
14	November 8, 2003	4–3	@ Detroit Red Wings (2003–04)	5–8–1–0	W
15	November 13, 2003	4–1	Calgary Flames (2003–04)	6–8–1–0	W
16	November 15, 2003	4–3	New York Islanders (2003–04)	7–8–1–0	W
17	November 19, 2003	0–3	@ Los Angeles Kings (2003–04)	7–9–1–0	L
18	November 21, 2003	4–3 OT	@ Mighty Ducks of Anaheim (2003–04)	8–9–1–0	W
19	November 22, 2003	1–3	@ San Jose Sharks (2003–04)	8–10–1–0	L
20	November 24, 2003	3–2	@ Colorado Avalanche (2003–04)	9–10–1–0	W
21	November 26, 2003	4–2	Columbus Blue Jackets (2003–04)	10–10–1–0	W
22	November 28, 2003	2–1	@ Boston Bruins (2003–04)	11–10–1–0	W
23	November 29, 2003	4–1	Buffalo Sabres (2003–04)	12–10–1–0	W

December: 4–4–3–2 (home: 1–1–2–1; road: 3–3–1–1)

Game	Date	Score	Opponent	Record	Recap
24	December 3, 2003	2–1 OT	@ Carolina Hurricanes (2003–04)	13–10–1–0	W
25	December 4, 2003	4–2	@ Columbus Blue Jackets (2003–04)	14–10–1–0	W
26	December 6, 2003	1–4	@ St. Louis Blues (2003–04)	14–11–1–0	L
27	December 11, 2003	1–4	Los Angeles Kings (2003–04)	14–12–1–0	L
28	December 13, 2003	2–2 OT	Florida Panthers (2003–04)	14–12–2–0	T
29	December 16, 2003	1–2 OT	Vancouver Canucks (2003–04)	14–12–2–1	OTL
30	December 18, 2003	4–5 OT	@ Montreal Canadiens (2003–04)	14–12–2–2	OTL
31	December 20, 2003	1–0	Detroit Red Wings (2003–04)	15–12–2–2	W
32	December 22, 2003	3–3 OT	Phoenix Coyotes (2003–04)	15–12–3–2	T
33	December 23, 2003	3–3 OT	@ Minnesota Wild (2003–04)	15–12–4–2	T
34	December 26, 2003	1–2	@ Dallas Stars (2003–04)	15–13–4–2	L
35	December 27, 2003	3–1	@ Phoenix Coyotes (2003–04)	16–13–4–2	W
36	December 29, 2003	2–5	@ San Jose Sharks (2003–04)	16–14–4–2	L

January: 10–4–2–0 (home: 8–0–1–0; road: 2–4–1–0)

Game	Date	Score	Opponent	Record	Recap
37	January 1, 2004	3–2	Pittsburgh Penguins (2003–04)	17–14–4–2	W
38	January 3, 2004	3–2	New Jersey Devils (2003–04)	18–14–4–2	W
39	January 5, 2004	0–6	@ Detroit Red Wings (2003–04)	18–15–4–2	L
40	January 6, 2004	1–2	@ Toronto Maple Leafs (2003–04)	18–16–4–2	L
41	January 8, 2004	4–3 OT	Colorado Avalanche (2003–04)	19–16–4–2	W
42	January 10, 2004	3–1	St. Louis Blues (2003–04)	20–16–4–2	W
43	January 12, 2004	3–3 OT	@ Minnesota Wild (2003–04)	20–16–5–2	T
44	January 13, 2004	0–0 OT	Los Angeles Kings (2003–04)	20–16–6–2	T
45	January 15, 2004	4–3	Phoenix Coyotes (2003–04)	21–16–6–2	W
46	January 17, 2004	2–1	Edmonton Oilers (2003–04)	22–16–6–2	W
47	January 19, 2004	2–0	Minnesota Wild (2003–04)	23–16–6–2	W
48	January 22, 2004	0–4	@ Calgary Flames (2003–04)	23–17–6–2	L
49	January 24, 2004	4–3	@ Edmonton Oilers (2003–04)	24–17–6–2	W
50	January 25, 2004	1–4	@ Vancouver Canucks (2003–04)	24–18–6–2	L
51	January 29, 2004	6–4	@ Columbus Blue Jackets (2003–04)	25–18–6–2	W
52	January 31, 2004	3–2 OT	San Jose Sharks (2003–04)	26–18–6–2	W

February: 6–5–1–0 (home: 4–2–1–0; road: 2–3–0–0)

Game	Date	Score	Opponent	Record	Recap
53	February 3, 2004	1–4	Detroit Red Wings (2003–04)	26–19–6–2	L
54	February 5, 2004	2–5	Tampa Bay Lightning (2003–04)	26–20–6–2	L
55	February 11, 2004	2–5	@ Chicago Blackhawks (2003–04)	26–21–6–2	L
56	February 13, 2004	5–2	Washington Capitals (2003–04)	27–21–6–2	W
57	February 15, 2004	2–2 OT	Edmonton Oilers (2003–04)	27–21–7–2	T
58	February 16, 2004	2–4	@ Columbus Blue Jackets (2003–04)	27–22–7–2	L
59	February 18, 2004	7–3	San Jose Sharks (2003–04)	28–22–7–2	W
60	February 20, 2004	3–2 OT	@ Mighty Ducks of Anaheim (2003–04)	29–22–7–2	W
61	February 21, 2004	8–2	@ Phoenix Coyotes (2003–04)	30–22–7–2	W
62	February 23, 2004	0–3	@ Los Angeles Kings (2003–04)	30–23–7–2	L
63	February 26, 2004	4–0	Minnesota Wild (2003–04)	31–23–7–2	W
64	February 28, 2004	2–1 OT	New York Rangers (2003–04)	32–23–7–2	W

March: 4–5–4–2 (home: 1–2–2–1; road: 3–3–2–1)

Game	Date	Score	Opponent	Record	Recap
65	March 1, 2004	2–2 OT	Chicago Blackhawks (2003–04)	32–23–8–2	T
66	March 3, 2004	2–5	@ Philadelphia Flyers (2003–04)	32–24–8–2	L
67	March 4, 2004	9–4	@ Pittsburgh Penguins (2003–04)	33–24–8–2	W
68	March 6, 2004	2–4	@ Ottawa Senators (2003–04)	33–25–8–2	L
69	March 9, 2004	2–3	Boston Bruins (2003–04)	33–26–8–2	L
70	March 11, 2004	1–1 OT	@ St. Louis Blues (2003–04)	33–26–9–2	T
71	March 13, 2004	4–4 OT	Calgary Flames (2003–04)	33–26–10–2	T
72	March 14, 2004	2–3 OT	@ Detroit Red Wings (2003–04)	33–26–10–3	OTL
73	March 16, 2004	2–2 OT	@ Vancouver Canucks (2003–04)	33–26–11–3	T
74	March 19, 2004	4–5	@ Edmonton Oilers (2003–04)	33–27–11–3	L
75	March 20, 2004	3–1	@ Calgary Flames (2003–04)	34–27–11–3	W
76	March 23, 2004	1–4	Mighty Ducks of Anaheim (2003–04)	34–28–11–3	L
77	March 25, 2004	4–2	@ New York Rangers (2003–04)	35–28–11–3	W
78	March 27, 2004	2–3 OT	Columbus Blue Jackets (2003–04)	35–28–11–4	OTL
79	March 30, 2004	5–2	Chicago Blackhawks (2003–04)	36–28–11–4	W

April: 2–1–0–0 (home: 0–1–0–0; road: 2–0–0–0)

Game	Date	Score	Opponent	Record	Recap
80	April 1, 2004	3–1	@ Chicago Blackhawks (2003–04)	37–28–11–4	W
81	April 3, 2004	1–4	St. Louis Blues (2003–04)	37–29–11–4	L
82	April 4, 2004	2–1 OT	@ Colorado Avalanche (2003–04)	38–29–11–4	W

Legend: W Win (2 points) L Loss (0 points) T Tie (1 point) OTL Overtime loss (1 point)

=== Playoffs ===
2004 Stanley Cup playoffs
Western Conference quarterfinals: vs. (1) Detroit Red Wings — Detroit wins 4–2

Game	Date	Visitor	Score	Home	OT	Decision	Attendance	Series	Recap
1	April 7	Nashville	1–3	Detroit		Legace	20,066	Red Wings lead 1–0	L
2	April 10	Nashville	1–2	Detroit		Legace	20,066	Red Wings lead 2–0	L
3	April 11	Detroit	1–3	Nashville		Legace	17,113	Red Wings lead 2–1	W
4	April 13	Detroit	0–3	Nashville		Legace	17,113	Series tied 2–2	W
5	April 15	Nashville	1–4	Detroit		Joseph	20,066	Red Wings lead 3–2	L
6	April 17	Detroit	2–0	Nashville		Joseph	17,329	Red Wings win 4–2	L

Legend: W Win L Loss

== Player statistics ==
=== Scoring ===
- Position abbreviations: C = Center; D = Defense; G = Goaltender; LW = Left wing; RW = Right wing
- † = Joined team via a transaction (e.g., trade, waivers, signing) during the season. Stats reflect time with the Predators only.
- ‡ = Left team via a transaction (e.g., trade, waivers, release) during the season. Stats reflect time with the Predators only.

No.	Player	Pos	Regular season						Playoffs					
No.	Player	Pos	GP	G	A	Pts	+/-	PIM	GP	G	A	Pts	+/-	PIM
24	Scott Walker	RW	75	25	42	67	4	94	6	0	1	1	−3	6
3	Marek Zidlicky	D	82	14	39	53	−16	82	1	0	0	0	0	0
10	Martin Erat	RW	76	16	33	49	10	38	6	0	1	1	−2	6
11	David Legwand	C	82	18	29	47	9	46	6	1	0	1	1	8
44	Kimmo Timonen	D	77	12	32	44	−7	52	6	0	0	0	−3	10
33	Vladimir Orszagh	RW	82	16	21	37	−4	74	6	2	0	2	−2	4
17	Scott Hartnell	LW	59	18	15	33	−5	87	6	1	2	3	3	2
22	Greg Johnson	C	82	14	18	32	−21	33	6	1	2	3	4	0
26	Steve Sullivan†	RW	24	9	21	30	8	12	6	1	1	2	−4	6
18	Adam Hall	RW	79	13	14	27	−8	37	6	2	1	3	3	2
21	Andreas Johansson	C	47	12	15	27	−2	26	6	0	0	0	−3	0
2	Dan Hamhuis	D	80	7	19	26	−12	57	6	0	2	2	−2	6
25	Denis Arkhipov	C	72	9	12	21	−2	22	—	—	—	—	—	—
15	Rem Murray	LW	39	8	9	17	−1	12	—	—	—	—	—	—
27	Jason York	D	67	2	13	15	−4	64	6	0	3	3	2	4
4	Mark Eaton	D	75	4	9	13	16	26	6	0	0	0	−2	2
28	Jeremy Stevenson†	LW	53	5	4	9	−2	103	6	0	0	0	−1	8
42	Andrew Hutchinson	D	18	4	4	8	1	4	—	—	—	—	—	—
55	Jordin Tootoo	RW	70	4	4	8	−6	137	5	0	0	0	0	4
46	Wyatt Smith	C	18	3	1	4	2	2	—	—	—	—	—	—
19	Jim McKenzie	LW	61	1	3	4	−13	88	1	0	0	0	0	0
23	Jamie Allison	D	47	0	3	3	−7	76	—	—	—	—	—	—
36	Robert Schnabel	D	20	0	3	3	6	34	—	—	—	—	—	—
9	Sergei Zholtok†	C	11	1	1	2	−2	0	6	1	0	1	−3	0
34	Shane Hnidy†	D	9	0	2	2	3	10	5	0	0	0	0	6
45	Jason Morgan†‡	C	6	0	2	2	0	2	—	—	—	—	—	—
29	Tomas Vokoun	G	73	0	2	2		35	6	0	0	0		0
20	Simon Gamache†	C	7	1	0	1	−3	0	—	—	—	—	—	—
5	Tomas Kloucek‡	D	5	0	1	1	3	10	—	—	—	—	—	—
6	Stan Neckar†‡	D	1	0	1	1	2	0	—	—	—	—	—	—
7	Scottie Upshall	LW	7	0	1	1	−2	0	—	—	—	—	—	—
5	Brad Bombardir†	D	13	0	0	0	1	4	6	0	1	1	1	2
26	Wade Brookbank‡	LW	9	0	0	0	−4	38	—	—	—	—	—	—
32	Mathieu Darche	LW	2	0	0	0	−1	0	—	—	—	—	—	—
40	Mike Farrell	RW	1	0	0	0	0	0	—	—	—	—	—	—
38	Vernon Fiddler	C	17	0	0	0	−6	23	—	—	—	—	—	—
30	Chris Mason	G	17	0	0	0		4	—	—	—	—	—	—
47	Libor Pivko	LW	1	0	0	0	0	0	—	—	—	—	—	—
16	Timofei Shishkanov	LW	2	0	0	0	−1	0	—	—	—	—	—	—

=== Goaltending ===
No.	Player	Regular season										Playoffs								
No.	Player	GP	W	L	T	SA	GA	GAA	SV%	SO	TOI	GP	W	L	SA	GA	GAA	SV%	SO	TOI
29	Tomas Vokoun	73	34	29	10	1958	178	2.53	.909	3	4221	6	2	4	197	12	2.02	.939	1	356
30	Chris Mason	17	4	4	1	365	27	2.18	.926	1	744	—	—	—	—	—	—	—	—	—

== Awards and records ==
=== Awards ===
Type	Award/honor	Recipient	Ref
League (in-season)	NHL All-Star Game selection	Kimmo Timonen	
League (in-season)	NHL All-Star Game selection	Tomas Vokoun	
League (in-season)	NHL Defensive Player of the Week	Tomas Vokoun (December 1)	
League (in-season)	NHL Offensive Player of the Week	Scott Walker (December 30)	
League (in-season)	NHL Offensive Player of the Week	Steve Sullivan (February 23)	
League (in-season)	NHL YoungStars Game selection	Dan Hamhuis	

=== Milestones ===
Milestone	Player	Date	Ref
First game	Wade Brookbank	October 9, 2003	
First game	Dan Hamhuis	October 9, 2003	
First game	Jordin Tootoo	October 9, 2003	
First game	Marek Zidlicky	October 9, 2003	
First game	Andrew Hutchinson	October 18, 2003	
First game	Libor Pivko	November 24, 2003	
First game	Timofei Shishkanov	December 23, 2003	

== Transactions ==
The Predators were involved in the following transactions from June 10, 2003, the day after the deciding game of the 2003 Stanley Cup Finals, through June 7, 2004, the day of the deciding game of the 2004 Stanley Cup Finals.

=== Trades ===
Date	Details		Ref
June 21, 2003	To Colorado Avalanche: Rights to Tomas Slovak	To Nashville Predators: Rights to Sergei Soin	
June 22, 2003	To Anaheim Mighty Ducks: 4th-round pick in 2003	To Nashville Predators: 4th-round pick in 2004; 5th-round pick in 2004	
June 22, 2003	To Los Angeles Kings: 6th-round pick in 2003	To Nashville Predators: 7th-round pick in 2003; 7th-round pick in 2003	
June 26, 2003	To Minnesota Wild: Peter Smrek	To Nashville Predators: Curtis Murphy	
June 27, 2003	To Buffalo Sabres: Andy Delmore	To Nashville Predators: 3rd-round pick in 2004	
June 30, 2003	To Colorado Avalanche: Karlis Skrastins	To Nashville Predators: Future considerations (Note: 3rd-round pick in 2004)	
July 14, 2003	To Washington Capitals: Alex Riazantsev	To Nashville Predators: Mike Farrell	
December 2, 2003	To Atlanta Thrashers: Tomas Kloucek; Ben Simon	To Nashville Predators: Simon Gamache; Kirill Safronov	
December 17, 2003	To Vancouver Canucks: Wade Brookbank	To Nashville Predators: Future considerations	
February 16, 2004	To Chicago Blackhawks: 2nd-round pick in 2004; 2nd-round pick in 2005	To Nashville Predators: Steve Sullivan	
February 25, 2004	To Tampa Bay Lightning: Timo Helbling	To Nashville Predators: 8th-round pick in 2004	
March 5, 2004	To Minnesota Wild: Buffalo’s 3rd-round pick in 2004; 4th-round pick in 2004	To Nashville Predators: Brad Bombardir; Sergei Zholtok	
March 9, 2004	To Ottawa Senators: Colorado’s 3rd-round pick in 2004	To Nashville Predators: Shane Hnidy	
March 9, 2004	To Tampa Bay Lightning: Stanislav Neckar	To Nashville Predators: 6th-round pick in 2004	

=== Players acquired ===
Date	Player	Former team	Term	Via	Ref
July 14, 2003	Ben Simon	Atlanta Thrashers		Free agency	
July 17, 2003	Ray Schultz	New York Islanders		Free agency	
July 22, 2003	Jim McKenzie	New Jersey Devils		Free agency	
September 10, 2003	Jamie Allison	Calgary Flames		Free agency	
September 10, 2003	Mathieu Darche	Columbus Blue Jackets		Free agency	
October 3, 2003	Wade Brookbank	Ottawa Senators		Waiver draft	
October 3, 2003	Chris Mason	Florida Panthers		Waiver draft	
October 22, 2003	Jeremy Stevenson	Minnesota Wild		Waivers	
November 4, 2003	Tony Hrkac	Atlanta Thrashers		Free agency	
November 26, 2003	Stanislav Neckar	Tampa Bay Lightning		Free agency	
December 31, 2003	Jason Morgan	Calgary Flames		Waivers	
January 30, 2004	Jeremy Yablonski	St. Louis Blues		Waivers	

=== Players lost ===
Date	Player	New team	Via (Note: In parentheses is the player's free agency group on July 1 if applicable.)	Ref
June 30, 2003	Oleg Petrov	Geneve-Servette HC (NLA) (Note: Petrov signed with Geneve-Servette on July 25.)	Buyout	
July 1, 2003	Brent Gilchrist (Note: Gilchrist retired.)		Contract expiration (III)	
July 1, 2003	Bill Houlder (Note: Houlder retired.)		Contract expiration (III)	
July 10, 2003	Cale Hulse	Phoenix Coyotes	Free agency (UFA)	
July 14, 2003	Domenic Pittis	Buffalo Sabres	Free agency (UFA)	
August 6, 2003	Jason Beckett	Minnesota Wild	Free agency (UFA)	
August 29, 2003	Reid Simpson	Pittsburgh Penguins	Free agency (III)	
September 5, 2003	Erik Anderson	Sheffield Steelers (EIHL)	Free agency (UFA)	
September 5, 2003	Bryan Lundbohm	HC Sierre (NLB)	Free agency (UFA)	
September 5, 2003	Vitali Yachmenev	Amur Khabarovsk (RSL)	Free agency (UFA)	
September 8, 2003	Denis Pederson	Eisbaren Berlin (DEL)	Free agency (UFA)	
October 20, 2003	Todd Warriner	Jokerit (Liiga)	Free agency (UFA)	
October 28, 2003	Clarke Wilm	Toronto Maple Leafs	Free agency (UFA)	
November 10, 2003	Jan Lasak	SKA Saint Petersburg (RSL)	Free agency	
February 19, 2004	Jason Morgan	Calgary Flames	Waivers	
April 28, 2004	Jonas Andersson	Sodertalje SK (SHL)	Free agency (Note: Nashville retained Andersson’s NHL rights and re-signed him on July 1, 2010.)	
May 19, 2004	Robert Schnabel	HC Sparta Praha (ELH)	Free agency	
May 28, 2004	Curtis Murphy	Lokomotiv Yaroslavl (RSL)	Free agency	

=== Signings ===
Date	Player	Term	Contract type	Ref
June 25, 2003	Mark Eaton		Re-signing	
June 25, 2003	Tomas Kloucek		Re-signing	
June 25, 2003	Libor Pivko		Entry-level	
June 25, 2003	Timofei Shishkanov		Entry-level	
June 30, 2003	Andreas Johansson		Re-signing	
July 1, 2003	Rem Murray		Re-signing	
July 8, 2003	Curtis Murphy		Re-signing	
July 8, 2003	Marek Zidlicky		Entry-level	
July 10, 2003	Scott Hartnell		Re-signing	
July 15, 2003	Denis Platonov		Entry-level	
July 17, 2003	Denis Arkhipov		Re-signing	
July 17, 2003	Wade Flaherty		Re-signing	
July 17, 2003	Robert Schnabel		Re-signing	
July 22, 2003	Andrei Mukhachev		Entry-level	
July 24, 2003	Mike Farrell		Re-signing	
August 15, 2003	Kimmo Timonen	4-year	Re-signing	
September 10, 2003	David Legwand		Re-signing	
December 24, 2003	Brandon Segal		Entry-level	
February 17, 2004	Scott Walker	3-year	Extension	
June 3, 2004	Chris Mason		Extension	

== Draft picks ==
Nashville's draft picks at the 2003 NHL entry draft held at the Gaylord Entertainment Center in Nashville, Tennessee.

Round	#	Player	Nationality	College/Junior/Club team (League)
1	7	Ryan Suter	United States	US Nat'l U-18 (NAHL)
2	35	Konstantin Glazachev	Russia	Lokomotiv Yaroslavl (Russia)
2	37	Kevin Klein	Canada	Toronto St. Michael's Majors (OHL)
2	49	Shea Weber	Canada	Kelowna Rockets (WHL)
3	76	Richard Stehlik	Slovakia	Sherbrooke Castors (QMJHL)
3	89	Paul Brown	Canada	Kamloops Blazers (WHL)
3	92	Alexander Sulzer	Germany	Hamburg Freezers (Germany)
3	98	Grigory Shafigulin	Russia	Lokomotiv Yaroslavl (Russia)
4	117	Teemu Lassila	Finland	TPS (Finland)
4	133	Rustam Sidikov	Russia	CSKA Moscow (Russia)
7	210	Andrei Mukhachyov	Russia	CSKA Moscow (Russia)
7	213	Miroslav Hanuljak	Czech Republic	HC Litvinov Jr. (Czech Republic)
9	268	Lauris Darzins	Latvia	Lukko Jr. (Finland)

== Farm teams ==
- Milwaukee Admirals (AHL)
- Toledo Storm (ECHL)

== See also ==
- 2003–04 NHL season
