= 2001 Air Canada Cup =

Tournament details
- Venue: Prince George Multiplex in Prince George, BC
- Dates: April 23–29, 2001
- Teams: 6

Final positions
- Champions: Gouverneurs de Ste-Foy
- Runners-up: Calgary Royals
- Third place: Toronto Young Nationals

Tournament statistics
- Scoring leader: Andrew Joudrey

Awards
- MVP: Steve Bernier

The 2001 Air Canada Cup was Canada's 23rd annual national midget 'AAA' hockey championship, played April 23–29, 2001 at the Prince George Multiplex in Prince George, British Columbia. Steve Bernier scored the winning goal in the second overtime period of the gold medal game to give the Gouverneurs de Ste-Foy a 4-3 victory over the Calgary Royals. It was Ste-Foy's third national title in eight appearances in the final.

== Teams ==
Result	Team	Region	City
1st place, gold medalist(s)	Gouverneurs de Ste-Foy	Quebec	Sainte-Foy, QC
2nd place, silver medalist(s)	Calgary Royals	Pacific	Calgary, AB
3rd place, bronze medalist(s)	Toronto Young Nationals	Central	Toronto, ON
4	Dartmouth Subways	Atlantic	Dartmouth, NS
5	Prince George Cougars	Host	Prince George, BC
6	Beardy's Blackhawks	West	Duck Lake, SK

== Round robin ==
=== Standings ===
Pos	Team	Pld	W	L	D	GF	GA	GD	Pts
1	Calgary Royals	5	4	1	0	27	18	+9	8
2	Dartmouth Subways	5	3	1	1	25	21	+4	7
3	Gouverneurs de Ste-Foy	5	3	2	0	20	15	+5	6
4	Toronto Young Nationals	5	3	2	0	19	18	+1	6
5	Prince George Cougars	5	1	4	0	13	24	−11	2
6	Beardy's Blackhawks	5	0	4	1	18	26	−8	1

=== Scores ===
- Ste-Foy 4 - Toronto 3
- Calgary 6 - Dartmouth 4
- Prince George 6 - Beardy's 4
- Dartmouth 3 - Ste-Foy 2 (OT)
- Toronto 3 - Beardy's 2
- Calgary 7 - Prince George 2
- Toronto 6 - Calgary 4
- Ste-Foy 6 - Beardy's 2
- Dartmouth 5 - Prince George 2
- Dartmouth 7 - Toronto 5
- Calgary 5 - Beardy's 4 (OT)
- Ste-Foy 6 - Price George 2
- Beardy's 6 - Dartmouth 6
- Calgary 5 - Ste-Foy 2
- Toronto 2 - Prince George 1

== Playoffs ==
=== Semi-finals ===
- Calgary 6 - Toronto 0
- Ste-Foy 10 - Dartmouth 1

=== Bronze-medal game ===
- Toronto 4 - Dartmouth 3 (OT)

=== Gold-medal game ===
- Ste-Foy 4 - Calgary 3 (2OT)

== Individual awards ==
- Most Valuable Player: Steve Bernier (Ste-Foy)
- Top Scorer: Andrew Joudrey (Dartmouth)
- Top Forward: Brett Pilkington (Calgary)
- Top Defenceman: Justin Cruse (Beardy's)
- Top Goaltender: Mike Charlton (Dartmouth)
- Most Sportsmanlike Player: Robert Cranston (Toronto)

== Regional Playdowns ==
=== Atlantic Region ===
- The Dartmouth Subways advanced by winning their regional tournament, which was played April 4–8, 2001 in Miramichi, New Brunswick.

=== Quebec ===
- The Gouverneurs du Ste-Foy advanced by capturing the Quebec Midget AAA League title.

=== Central Region ===
- The Toronto Young Nationals advanced by winning their regional tournament, which was played April 3–8, 2001 in Kitchener, Ontario.

=== West Region ===
- The Beady's Blackhawks advanced by winning their regional tournament, which was played April 4–8, 2001 in Moose Jaw, Saskatchewan.

=== Pacific Region ===
- The Prince George Cougars won their regional tournament, which was played April 4–8, 2001 in Alberta, but qualified for the national championship as the host team. As a result, the Calgary Royals also advanced by finishing second.

== See also ==
- Telus Cup
