= Casey Borer =

American ice hockey player (born 1985)

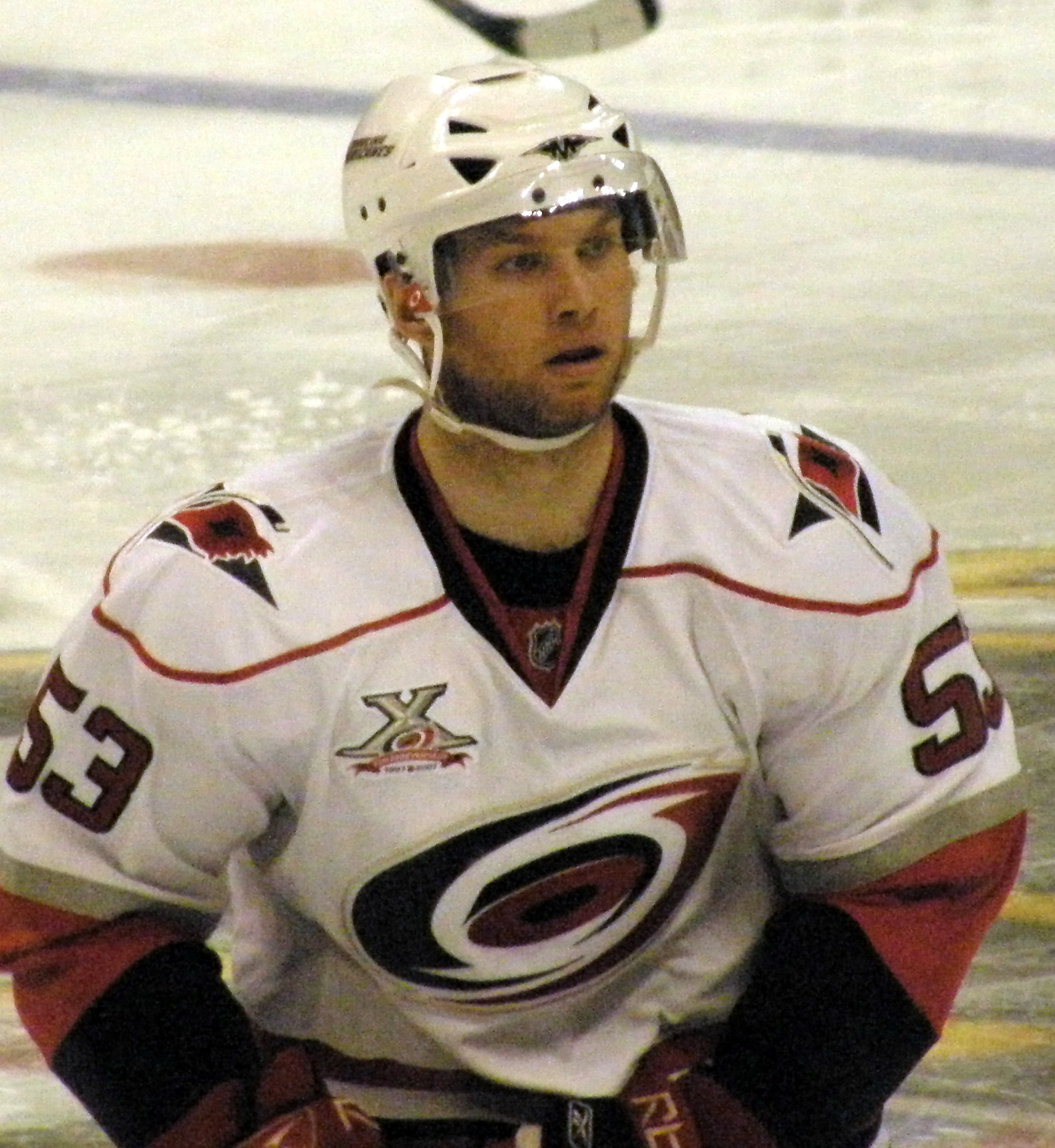
- Born: July 28, 1985 (age 40) Minneapolis, Minnesota, U.S.
- Height: 6 ft 2 in (188 cm)
- Weight: 205 lb (93 kg; 14 st 9 lb)
- Position: Defense
- Shot: Left
- Played for: Carolina Hurricanes; HC Pardubice; Eisbären Berlin; Thomas Sabo Ice Tigers; Nippon Paper Cranes
- NHL draft: 69th overall, 2004; Carolina Hurricanes
- Playing career: 2007–2019

Casey Patrick Borer (born July 28, 1985 in Minneapolis, Minnesota) is an American former professional ice hockey player. He played in the National Hockey League (NHL) for the Carolina Hurricanes.

== Playing career ==
Borer grew up in Brooklyn Park. As a junior, he was selected to play in the USA Hockey National Team Development Program in Ann Arbor before recruited to play collegiate hockey with St. Cloud State University of the Western Collegiate Hockey Association. He was drafted in the 3rd round, 69th overall in the 2004 NHL entry draft by the Carolina Hurricanes.

Borer was recalled to the Hurricanes to play his first career game on January 2, 2008 against the Atlanta Thrashers. At the time, the Hurricanes were playing a home-and-home series against the Thrashers, and Borer scored his first NHL goal a game later, on January 4 against Kari Lehtonen of the Thrashers.

Borer played a total of 11 NHL games for the Hurricanes that season, scoring three points (1 goal, 2 assists), recording four penalty minutes and averaging 15:17 of ice time per game. Recalled to Carolina on February 14 for the second time this year, the Minnesota native played in three games for the Hurricanes during his most recent call-up, averaging almost 29 shifts and 17:58 of ice time per game. With the Albany River Rats of the American Hockey League (AHL), Borer ranked third amongst defensemen with 19 points (6 goals, 13 assists) and led the team with a +19 plus/minus rating.

On, February 21, 2008, Borer was returned to the Albany River Rats. He was on loan for the injured Bret Hedican who was cleared for play earlier in the week.

Borer sustained a season-ending injury of his own in the March 28, 2008 match with Syracuse Crunch after colliding with Crunch center Trevor Frischmon. He recalled the incident, "It was the start of the period, and they didn't let the ice freeze," Borer said. "I was carrying the puck up and it got stuck in the water, and I kind of twisted back for it with my torso, and my knees didn't come with me. The guy was already lining up to hit me, and I was in a vulnerable position. My knee must have been exposed, and we just got twisted up weird." The injury led to surgery on his right knee April 7, 2008 in Raleigh, North Carolina by team doctors of the Carolina Hurricanes.

In late February 2009, he again suffered a season-ending injury, a C5 cervical spine fracture during a team bus accident in Albany.

Prior to the 2010–11 season he signed with the Carolina Hurricanes organization, but was assigned to their AHL affiliate, the Charlotte Checkers. Playing in 67 games, he scored 2 goals and 14 points for the Checkers. On August 18, 2011, he signed with the HC Pardubice of the Czech Extraliga for his first contract with a European club.

On July 7, 2013, Borer left the Thomas Sabo Ice Tigers and signed a one-year contract to remain in Germany with Eisbären Berlin. After two seasons with Berlin, Borer returned to the Thomas Sabo Ice Tigers as a free agent on April 15, 2015. In August 2016, Borer joined the Japanese Nippon Paper Cranes of the Asia League.

== Career statistics ==
=== Regular season and playoffs ===
			Regular season					Playoffs
Season	Team	League	GP	G	A	Pts	PIM	GP	G	A	Pts	PIM
2001–02	Shattuck–Saint Mary's	HSMN	62	8	17	25	80	—	—	—	—	—
2002–03	US NTDP Juniors	NAHL	10	1	2	3	10	—	—	—	—	—
2002–03	US NTDP U18	USDP	46	2	2	4	36	—	—	—	—	—
2003–04	St. Cloud State University	WCHA	32	0	9	9	18	—	—	—	—	—
2004–05	St. Cloud State University	WCHA	35	0	11	11	40	—	—	—	—	—
2005–06	St. Cloud State University	WCHA	42	3	8	11	24	—	—	—	—	—
2006–07	St. Cloud State University	WCHA	40	2	9	11	30	—	—	—	—	—
2006–07	Albany River Rats	AHL	1	0	0	0	0	—	—	—	—	—
2007–08	Albany River Rats	AHL	61	6	13	19	58	—	—	—	—	—
2007–08	Carolina Hurricanes	NHL	11	1	2	3	4	—	—	—	—	—
2008–09	Albany River Rats	AHL	51	4	6	10	26	—	—	—	—	—
2008–09	Carolina Hurricanes	NHL	3	0	0	0	5	—	—	—	—	—
2009–10	Albany River Rats	AHL	30	1	8	9	13	6	0	1	1	0
2009–10	Carolina Hurricanes	NHL	2	0	0	0	0	—	—	—	—	—
2010–11	Charlotte Checkers	AHL	67	2	12	14	26	15	1	2	3	12
2011–12	HC ČSOB Pojišťovna Pardubice	ELH	52	0	10	10	30	19	1	3	4	10
2012–13	Thomas Sabo Ice Tigers	DEL	49	11	18	29	61	3	0	2	2	0
2013–14	Eisbären Berlin	DEL	50	5	9	14	22	3	0	0	0	0
2014–15	Eisbären Berlin	DEL	46	5	9	14	22	3	1	0	1	0
2015–16	Thomas Sabo Ice Tigers	DEL	43	1	15	16	26	6	0	2	2	4
2016–17	Nippon Paper Cranes	ALH	48	6	27	33	18	2	0	1	1	2
2017–18	Tölzer Löwen	DEL2	15	4	8	12	6	—	—	—	—	—
2018–19	Tölzer Löwen	DEL2	51	6	19	25	22	—	—	—	—	—
AHL totals			210	13	39	52	123	21	1	3	4	12
NHL totals			16	1	2	3	9	—	—	—	—	—
DEL totals			188	22	51	73	131	15	1	4	5	4

=== International ===
Year	Team	Event	Result	GP	G	A	Pts	PIM
2003	United States	WJC18	4th	6	0	0	0	2
2005	United States	WJC	4th	6	0	0	0	6
Junior totals				12	0	0	0	8

== Awards and achievements ==
Served as team captain for two consecutive seasons for St. Cloud State, which finished the season ranked No. 7 in the country his senior year.

Attended Shattuck-St. Mary's prep school and Huron High School, winning the Midget AAA national title while at Shattuck-St. Mary's … Was part of the U.S. National Team Development Program before attending St. Cloud State, and has twice represented the United States in international competition: at the 2003 Under-18 World Junior Championships and the 2005 World Junior Championships … Was twice chosen as a WCHA All-Academic selection

== Personal ==
Born to John and Raven Borer, Casey has three siblings - two brothers, Brady and Riley, and a sister, Mollie. Casey grew up on West River Road next to Titus Mcmanigle. He attended St. Alphonsus middle school in Brooklyn Center, MN. Casey is married to Natalie Borer and they have two children.
