= Lukáš Kašpar =

Czech ice hockey player (born 1985)

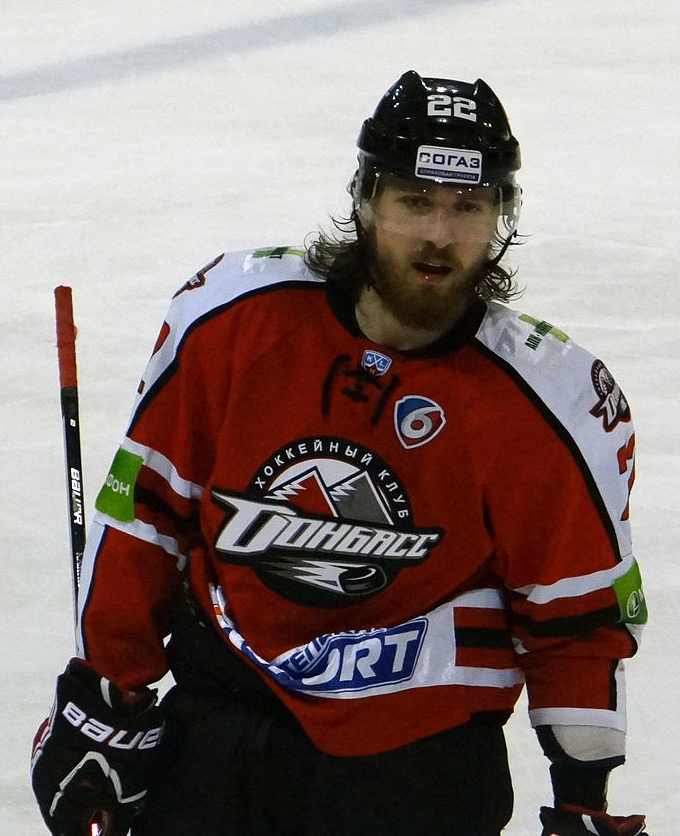
- Born: 23 September 1985 (age 40) Most, Czechoslovakia
- Height: 6 ft 2 in (188 cm)
- Weight: 202 lb (92 kg; 14 st 6 lb)
- Position: Left wing
- Shot: Left
- ELH team Former teams: HC Kometa Brno; HC Litvínov; San Jose Sharks; Oulun Kärpät; Barys Astana; HC Donbass; HC Ugra; HC Slovan Bratislava; Dynamo Moscow
- National team: Czech Republic
- NHL draft: 22nd overall, 2004; San Jose Sharks
- Playing career: 2005–2021

Lukáš Kašpar (born 23 September 1985) is a Czech former professional ice hockey player. He last played for HC Kometa Brno of the Czech Extraliga (ELH). He was originally drafted by the San Jose Sharks in the first round (22nd overall) of the 2004 NHL entry draft.

== Playing career ==
Kašpar was the 22nd overall pick of the Sharks in the 2004 NHL entry draft. He came to North America in 2004 to play for the Ottawa 67's of the Ontario Hockey League, tallying 21 goals and 30 assists, making it to the Memorial Cup in his first and only year in Canadian Junior Hockey.

After signing a three-year entry-level contract with the Sharks, Kašpar scored his first goal in the National Hockey League on 12 October 2008 against Jason LaBarbera of the Los Angeles Kings in a 1–0 victory. Kašpar's second National Hockey League goal was again against the Kings on 19 February 2009 against goaltender Erik Ersberg.

On 21 July 2009, he signed a two-year, two-way contract with the Philadelphia Flyers for an undisclosed amount. He was assigned to the AHL affiliate Adirondack Phantoms before he opted to terminate his contract after 8 games and return to Europe on 4 November 2009, having signed a season-long deal with Kärpät in the Finnish SM-liiga.

After two seasons with HC Donbass, and with the club suspending operations due to civil unrest, Kaspar opted to join HC Ugra on a one-year deal on 10 July 2014.

== Career statistics ==
=== Regular season and playoffs ===
			Regular season					Playoffs
Season	Team	League	GP	G	A	Pts	PIM	GP	G	A	Pts	PIM
2001–02	HC Chemopetrol, a.s.	CZE U18	48	35	41	76	143	2	1	1	2	0
2002–03	HC Chemopetrol, a.s.	CZE U20	26	14	14	28	40	—	—	—	—	—
2002–03	HC Chemopetrol, a.s.	ELH	9	1	1	2	2	—	—	—	—	—
2003–04	HC Chemopetrol, a.s.	CZE U20	23	21	14	35	56	1	0	0	0	0
2003–04	HC Chemopetrol, a.s.	ELH	37	4	2	6	10	—	—	—	—	—
2003–04	HC Slovan Ústečtí Lvi	CZE.2	1	1	0	1	0	—	—	—	—	—
2003–04	SK HC Baník Most	CZE.3	—	—	—	—	—	1	0	0	0	2
2004–05	Ottawa 67's	OHL	59	21	30	51	45	21	6	14	20	8
2005–06	Cleveland Barons	AHL	76	14	22	36	88	—	—	—	—	—
2006–07	Worcester Sharks	AHL	78	12	28	40	64	6	0	2	2	6
2007–08	San Jose Sharks	NHL	3	0	0	0	0	—	—	—	—	—
2007–08	Worcester Sharks	AHL	73	17	24	41	44	—	—	—	—	—
2008–09	San Jose Sharks	NHL	13	2	2	4	8	—	—	—	—	—
2008–09	Worcester Sharks	AHL	65	17	27	44	40	12	2	2	4	0
2009–10	Adirondack Phantoms	AHL	8	1	2	3	4	—	—	—	—	—
2009–10	Kärpät	SM-l	39	14	17	31	20	10	1	4	5	12
2010–11	Barys Astana	KHL	51	23	18	41	41	4	1	0	1	10
2011–12	Barys Astana	KHL	52	13	20	33	44	7	3	1	4	0
2012–13	Donbass Donetsk	KHL	32	8	14	22	10	—	—	—	—	—
2013–14	Barys Astana	KHL	49	16	20	36	26	13	1	3	4	4
2014–15	HC Yugra	KHL	51	16	16	32	64	—	—	—	—	—
2014–15	Kärpät	Liiga	12	4	1	5	0	14	2	1	3	8
2015–16	HC Slovan Bratislava	KHL	58	16	31	47	39	4	0	2	2	2
2016–17	Dynamo Moscow	KHL	27	7	9	16	10	8	0	2	2	27
2016–17	Dynamo Balashikha	VHL	1	0	0	0	2	—	—	—	—	—
2017–18	HC Slovan Bratislava	KHL	46	4	17	21	54	—	—	—	—	—
2018–19	HC Kometa Brno	ELH	22	6	7	13	4	—	—	—	—	—
2018–19	HC Verva Litvínov	ELH	29	9	11	20	12	—	—	—	—	—
2019–20	HC Verva Litvínov	ELH	34	8	9	17	16	—	—	—	—	—
2019–20	BK Mladá Boleslav	ELH	9	4	5	9	6	—	—	—	—	—
2020–21	Anglet Hormadi Élite	FRA	7	2	10	12	12	—	—	—	—	—
AHL totals			300	61	103	164	240	18	2	4	6	6
NHL totals			16	2	2	4	8	—	—	—	—	—
KHL totals			366	103	145	248	288	36	5	8	13	43

=== International ===
Medal record

Representing Czech Republic

World Championships
Gold medal – first place	2010 Cologne	
Bronze medal – third place	2012 Helsinki	

Year	Team	Event	GP	G	A	Pts	PIM
2002	Czech Republic	U18	5	1
2003	Czech Republic	WJC18	6	2	2	4	6
2004	Czech Republic	WJC	6	0	3	3	2
2005	Czech Republic	WJC	7	1	1	2	16
2010	Czech Republic	WC	9	2	1	3	4
2012	Czech Republic	WC	7	0	1	1	4
2016	Czech Republic	WC	8	4	1	5	2
Junior totals			19	3	6	9	24
Senior totals			24	6	3	9	10

Awards and achievements
Preceded by Steve Bernier	San Jose Sharks first-round draft pick 2004	Succeeded by Devin Setoguchi
