= Konstantin Volkov (ice hockey, born 1985) =

Russian ice hockey player

- Born: 7 February 1985 (age 41) Leningrad, Soviet Union
- Height: 6 ft 0 in (183 cm)
- Weight: 192 lb (87 kg; 13 st 10 lb)
- Position: Right wing
- Shot: Left
- KHL team Former teams: Free Agent; Lada Togliatti; HC Vityaz Podolsk; HC MVD; HC Dynamo Moscow; Avtomobilist Yekaterinburg
- NHL draft: 125th overall, 2003; Toronto Maple Leafs
- Playing career: 2005–2017

Konstantin Volkov (born 7 February 1985) is a Russian professional ice hockey player who is currently an unrestricted free agent. He most recently played with Avtomobilist Yekaterinburg in the Kontinental Hockey League (KHL). He was selected by the Toronto Maple Leafs in the 4th round (125th overall) of the 2003 NHL entry draft.

== Career statistics ==
			Regular season					Playoffs
Season	Team	League	GP	G	A	Pts	PIM	GP	G	A	Pts	PIM
1999–2000	Izhorets St. Petersburg	RUS.3	2	0	1	1	0	—	—	—	—	—
2000–01	Izhorets St. Petersburg	RUS.3	14	7	6	13	10	—	—	—	—	—
2001–02	Dynamo–2 Moscow	RUS.3	21	3	7	10	10	—	—	—	—	—
2002–03	Dynamo–2 Moscow	RUS.3	31	10	14	24	20	—	—	—	—	—
2003–04	Lada–2 Togliatti	RUS.3	21	2	17	19	14	4	1	2	3	4
2003–04	CSK VVS Samara	RUS.2	22	6	6	12	16	—	—	—	—	—
2003–04	THK Tver	RUS.2	18	0	6	6	6	—	—	—	—	—
2004–05	Lada Togliatti	RSL	1	0	0	0	0	—	—	—	—	—
2004–05	Lada–2 Togliatti	RUS.3	53	25	31	56	66	—	—	—	—	—
2005–06	Vityaz Chekhov	RSL	28	3	2	5	8	—	—	—	—	—
2005–06	Vityaz–2 Chekhov	RUS.3	30	12	15	27	28	—	—	—	—	—
2006–07	Vityaz Chekhov	RSL	32	7	3	10	10	2	0	0	0	4
2006–07	Vityaz–2 Chekhov	RUS.3	14	11	10	21	12	—	—	—	—	—
2007–08	Vityaz Chekhov	RSL	16	0	2	2	4	—	—	—	—	—
2007–08	Vityaz–2 Chekhov	RUS.3	1	0	0	0	0	—	—	—	—	—
2007–08	HK Dmitrov	RUS.2	25	5	10	15	14	4	1	1	2	2
2008–09	HC Rys	RUS.2	61	29	38	67	42	—	—	—	—	—
2009–10	THK Tver	RUS.2	3	1	2	3	0	—	—	—	—	—
2009–10	HC MVD	KHL	44	10	11	21	26	22	2	2	4	20
2010–11	Dynamo Moscow	KHL	34	5	6	11	20	2	0	1	1	0
2011–12	Dynamo Moscow	KHL	37	9	5	14	8	16	1	0	1	6
2012–13	Dynamo Moscow	KHL	33	6	6	12	16	4	0	0	0	4
2013–14	Dynamo Moscow	KHL	43	8	11	19	16	5	1	0	1	0
2014–15	Dynamo Moscow	KHL	43	5	15	20	37	11	0	1	1	2
2014–15	Dynamo Balashikha	VHL	2	0	0	0	0	—	—	—	—	—
2015–16	Dynamo Moscow	KHL	43	4	3	7	12	2	0	0	0	4
2016–17	Avtomobilist Yekaterinburg	KHL	28	0	4	4	6	—	—	—	—	—
RUS.2 & VHL totals			131	41	62	103	78	4	1	1	2	2
RSL totals			77	10	7	17	22	2	0	0	0	4
KHL totals			305	47	61	108	141	62	4	4	8	36
