= Libor Pivko =

Czech ice hockey player

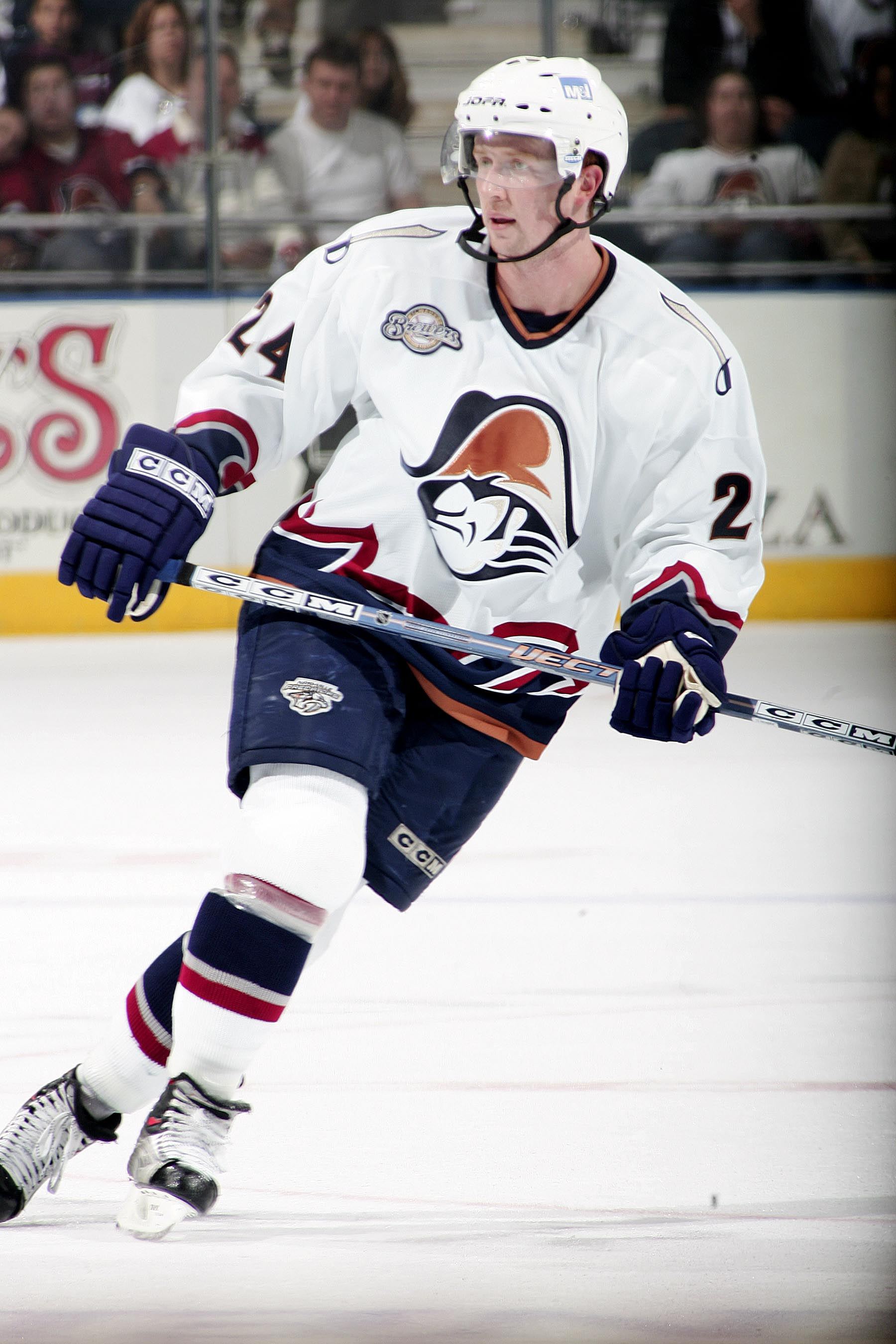
- Pivko with the Milwaukee Admirals in 2005
- Born: 29 March 1980 (age 46) Nový Jičín, Czechoslovakia
- Height: 6 ft 2 in (188 cm)
- Weight: 195 lb (88 kg; 13 st 13 lb)
- Position: Left wing
- Shot: Left
- Played for: HC Pardubice; HC Kometa Brno; HK Gomel; HC Dinamo Minsk; HC Neftekhimik Nizhnekamsk; Nashville Predators; HC Zlín; HC Havířov; HC Slezan Opava
- National team: Czech Republic
- NHL draft: 89th overall, 2000; Nashville Predators
- Playing career: 1998–2015

Libor Pivko (born 29 March 1980) is a Czech former professional ice hockey left winger. He was drafted in the third round, 89th overall, by the Nashville Predators in the 2000 NHL entry draft. He played one game in the National Hockey League with the Predators in the 2003–04 season, on 24 November 2003 against the Colorado Avalanche. The rest of his career, which lasted from 1998 to 2015, was mainly spent in the Czech Extraliga.

== Career statistics ==
=== Regular season and playoffs ===
			Regular season					Playoffs
Season	Team	League	GP	G	A	Pts	PIM	GP	G	A	Pts	PIM
1995–96	HC Bohemex Trade Opava	CZE U18	37	19	14	33	30	—	—	—	—	—
1996–97	HC Bohemex Trade Opava	CZE U18	16	12	9	21	22	—	—	—	—	—
1997–98	HC Bohemex Trade Opava	CZE U20	37	15	11	26	36	—	—	—	—	—
1998–99	HC Opava	CZE U20	38	21	14	35	—	—	—	—	—	—
1998–99	HC Opava	CZE	4	0	1	1	0	—	—	—	—	—
1999–00	HC Femax Havířov	CZE U20	5	1	3	4	4	—	—	—	—	—
1999–00	HC Femax Havířov	CZE	40	11	11	22	41	—	—	—	—	—
1999–00	HC Ytong Brno	CZE-3	4	3	4	7	0	4	3	4	7	0
2000–01	HC Femax Havířov	CZE U20	1	0	0	0	0	—	—	—	—	—
2000–01	HC Femax Havířov	CZE	45	7	12	19	58	—	—	—	—	—
2001–02	HC Continental Zlín	CZE	46	8	20	28	36	9	5	3	8	8
2002–03	HC Hamé Zlín	CZE	52	13	12	25	60	—	—	—	—	—
2003–04	Nashville Predators	NHL	1	0	0	0	0	—	—	—	—	—
2003–04	Milwaukee Admirals	AHL	57	11	20	31	50	21	7	6	13	22
2004–05	Milwaukee Admirals	AHL	56	5	15	20	59	6	0	1	1	2
2005–06	Milwaukee Admirals	AHL	69	12	58	70	63	12	3	5	8	16
2006–07	HC Moeller Pardubice	CZE	35	9	5	14	38	18	3	1	4	59
2007–08	HC Moeller Pardubice	CZE	28	7	7	14	28	—	—	—	—	—
2008–09	HC Moeller Pardubice	CZE	50	18	21	39	60	7	4	2	6	6
2009–10	HC Eaton Pardubice	CZE	49	11	15	26	44	13	2	8	10	8
2010–11	HC Eaton Pardubice	CZE	27	7	13	20	24	—	—	—	—	—
2010–11	Neftekhimik Nizhnekamsk	KHL	21	4	4	8	16	7	2	1	3	6
2011–12	Dinamo Minsk	KHL	47	7	11	18	71	4	0	0	0	6
2012–13	Dinamo Minsk	KHL	39	1	5	6	52	—	—	—	—	—
2012–13	HC Gomel	BLR	1	0	0	0	0	—	—	—	—	—
2013–14	HC Kometa Brno	CZE	6	1	2	3	6	18	5	5	10	10
2013–14	SK Horácká Slavia Třebíč	CZE-2	2	3	0	3	2	—	—	—	—	—
2014–15	HC ČSOB Pojišťovna Pardubice	CZE	1	0	0	0	0	—	—	—	—	—
CZE totals			383	92	119	211	397	65	19	19	38	91
NHL totals			1	0	0	0	0	—	—	—	—	—
KHL totals			107	12	20	32	139	11	2	1	3	12

=== International ===
Year	Team	Event	GP	G	A	Pts	PIM
2000	Czech Republic	WJC	7	1	2	3	4
Junior totals			7	1	2	3	4

== See also ==
- List of players who played only one game in the NHL
