= Steve Bernier =

Canadian ice hockey player (born 1985)

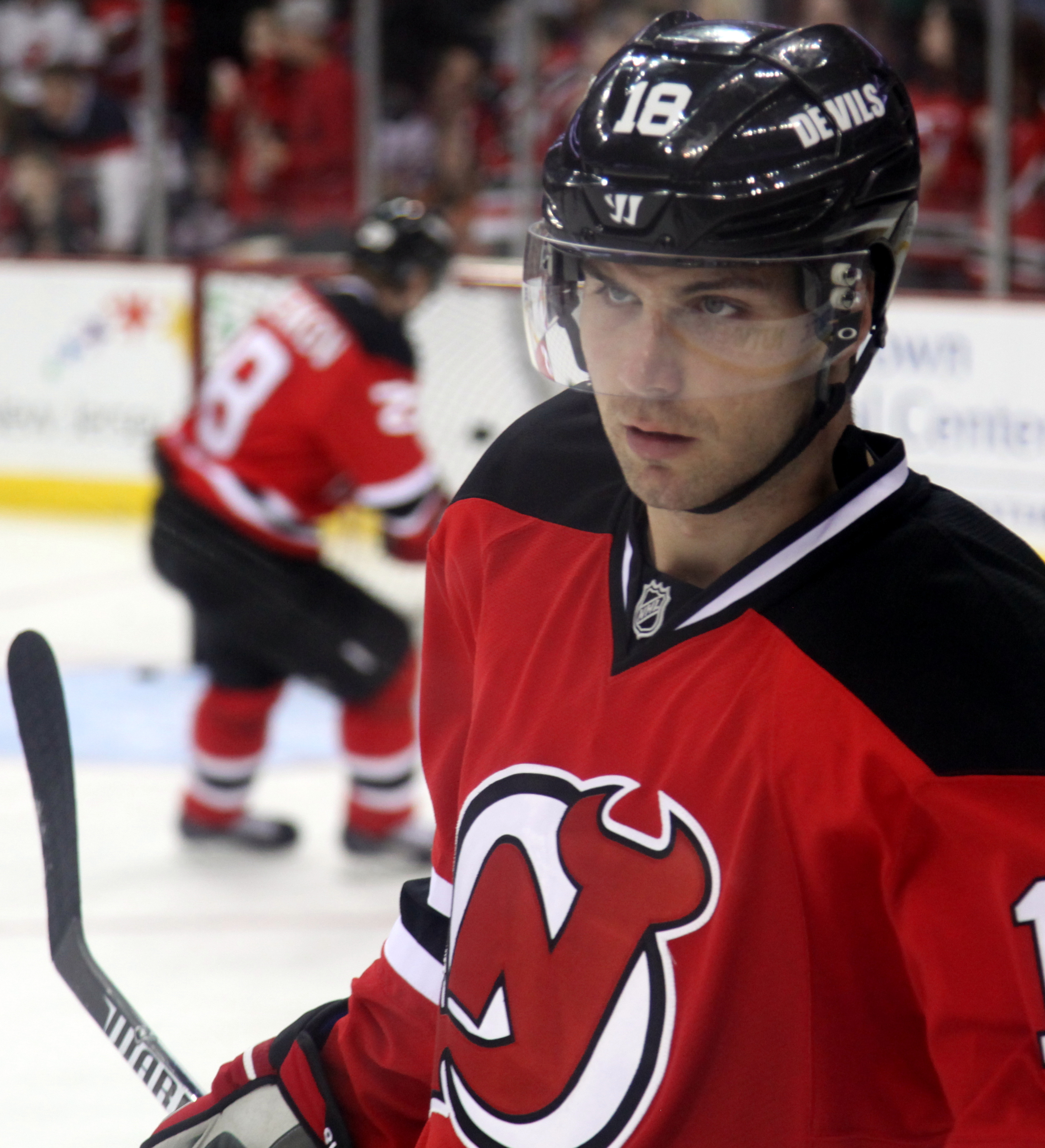
- Bernier with the New Jersey Devils in 2014
- Born: March 31, 1985 (age 41) Quebec City, Quebec, Canada
- Height: 6 ft 3 in (191 cm)
- Weight: 220 lb (100 kg; 15 st 10 lb)
- Position: Right wing
- Shot: Right
- Played for: San Jose Sharks; Buffalo Sabres; Vancouver Canucks; Florida Panthers; New Jersey Devils; New York Islanders
- NHL draft: 16th overall, 2003; San Jose Sharks
- Playing career: 2005–2020

Steve Bernier (born March 31, 1985) is a Canadian former professional ice hockey right winger. Selected in the first round, 16th overall, in the 2003 NHL entry draft by the San Jose Sharks, Bernier would play for the Sharks, Buffalo Sabres, Vancouver Canucks, Florida Panthers, New Jersey Devils and the New York Islanders during his time in the NHL.

== Playing career ==
=== Junior ===
As a youth, Bernier played in the 1998 and 1999 Quebec International Pee-Wee Hockey Tournaments with a minor ice hockey team from Quebec City.

After capturing the 2001 Air Canada Cup, while being named Tournament MVP, with the Gouverneurs de Ste-Foy, Bernier was drafted first overall in the 2001 Quebec Major Junior Hockey League (QMJHL) Midget Draft. He played his entire four-season major junior career with the Moncton Wildcats. In his rookie year, he led Moncton in goals and finished fourth among QMJHL rookies in overall scoring; he was named to the 2001–02 QMJHL All-Rookie Team. His most productive junior season came in his draft year, 2002–03, when he scored 49 goals and 101 points, ninth in League scoring. He was named to the QMJHL Second All-Star Team.

Going into the 2003 NHL entry draft, the San Jose Sharks traded their 21st, 66th and 107th selections in exchange for the 16th overall position, with which they used to draft Bernier. Upon being drafted, Bernier played two more seasons with Moncton and was named once more to the QMJHL Second All-Star Team in 2003–04. Helping lead Moncton to the 2004 QMJHL Finals, he scored seven goals and ten assists in 20 playoff games. However, the Wildcats were eliminated by the Gatineau Olympiques in five games. In his fourth and final junior season, in 2004–05, Bernier tallied 71 points (tops in team scoring) and 114 penalty minutes in 68 games, but it marked the second-straight season his offensive output had dropped. Soon after being eliminated in the second round, the Sharks signed Bernier to his first professional contract, a three-year deal.

=== Professional ===
==== San Jose Sharks and Buffalo Sabres ====
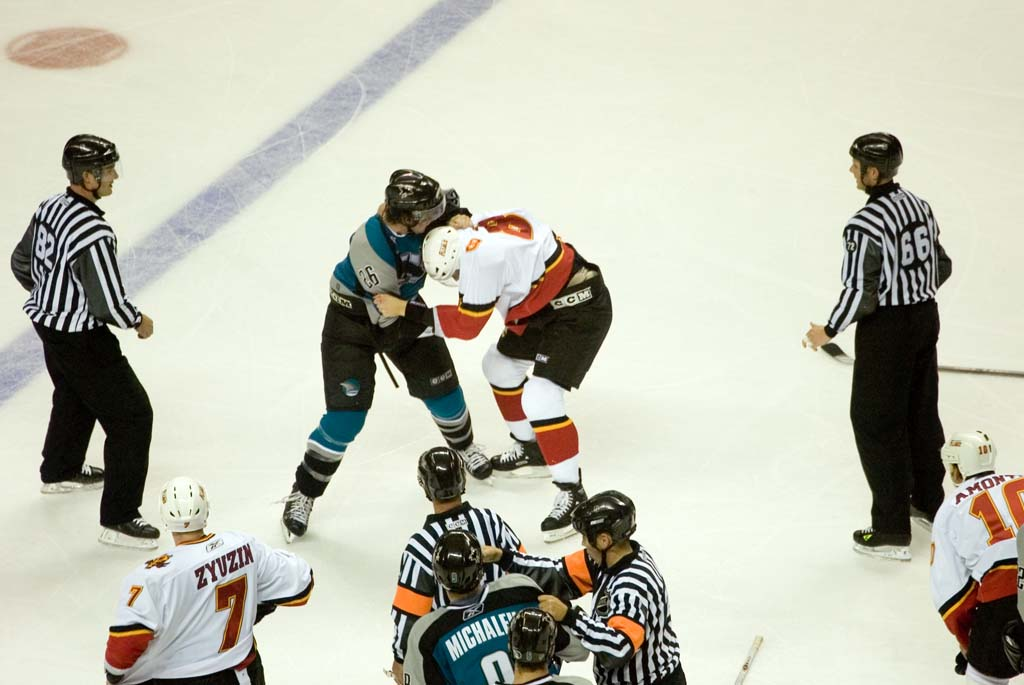
Bernier fighting Calgary Flames defenceman Brad Ference as a member of the Sharks

Bernier split his first professional season, 2005–06, between the Sharks and their American Hockey League (AHL) affiliate, the Cleveland Barons. He scored 14 goals and added 13 assists in 39 games with the Sharks for a successful rookie season. His first NHL goal was scored on November 12, 2005, against Marty Turco of the Dallas Stars. In the 2006 playoffs, he added one goal and five assists in 11 games, as San Jose was eliminated in the second round.

Midway through his sophomore season, Bernier was sent back to the AHL after the Sharks suffered an 8–0 loss to the Phoenix Coyotes. However, Bernier soon broke his toe and missed a month's worth of games. After rehabilitation and ten games with Worcester (San Jose's new AHL affiliate), Bernier rejoined the Sharks in late February.

On February 26, at the 2007–08 trade deadline, Bernier was sent to the Buffalo Sabres, along with a first-round draft pick, in exchange for defenceman Brian Campbell and a seventh-round pick. The next day, in his Sabres debut, Bernier scored two goals on his first two shots and later added an assist, helping Buffalo to an 8–4 win over the Nashville Predators. At the time, Thomas Vanek wore number 26 for the Sabres, so Bernier chose the number 56 instead.

==== Vancouver Canucks ====
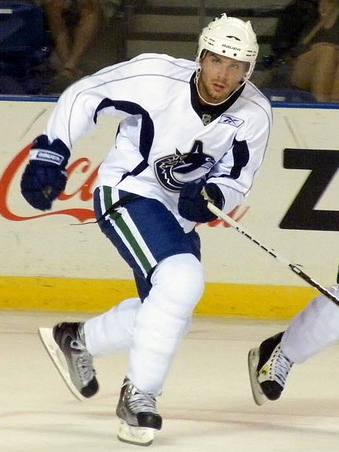
Bernier during the Vancouver Canucks' 2009 training camp

As Bernier became a restricted free agent at the end of the season, he was traded to the Vancouver Canucks in exchange for a second-round draft pick in 2010 and a third-round draft pick in 2009 (Los Angeles' selection). While Bernier was admittedly surprised with the trade, he expressed approval in moving to Vancouver. Four days later, he was extended a one-year, $2.5 million offer sheet by the St. Louis Blues, which the Canucks quickly matched. Playing in his first season with Vancouver, he injured both his left shoulder and left toe after missing a check on defenceman Brett Lebda and hitting the boards on November 24, 2008, against the Detroit Red Wings. However, he was only briefly sidelined and, setting career-highs in assists and points, he was awarded the Fred J. Hume Award as the team's unsung hero. Although Bernier was seen at the start of the season as a promising candidate for the Canucks' top line with the Henrik and Daniel Sedin, he settled into a third-line checking role with linemates Kyle Wellwood and Mason Raymond in the latter stages of the season. Following the Canucks' second round elimination to the Chicago Blackhawks, Bernier was re-signed to a two-year, $4 million contract on May 14, 2009.

In preparation for the 2009–10 season, Bernier reported to training camp 15 pounds (6.8 kg) lighter.

==== Florida Panthers ====
On June 25, 2010, during the 2010 NHL entry draft, Bernier was traded, along with Michael Grabner and the Canucks' first-round choice in the Draft (25th overall, used to select Quinton Howden), to the Florida Panthers in exchange for Keith Ballard and Victor Oreskovich. In November 2010, Bernier missed eight games with a right eye injury. Later in the season, he was placed on waivers by Florida on February 24, 2011, but went unclaimed. Remaining with Florida, he missed the final two games of the season with a shoulder injury, finishing with 15 points (five goals and ten assists) over 68 contests in 2010–11. Set to become a restricted free agent in the off-season, Florida chose not to tender Bernier a qualifying offer, giving him unrestricted status on July 1, 2011.

==== New Jersey Devils ====
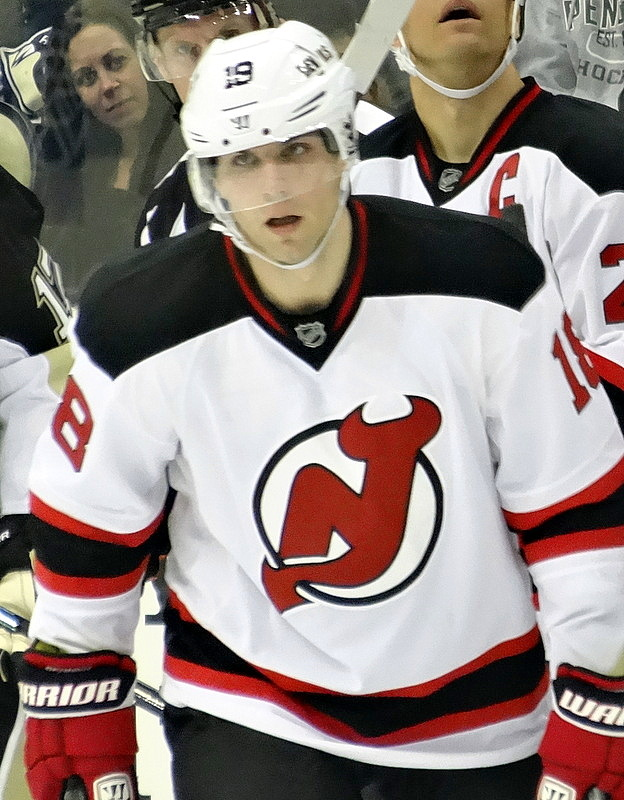
Bernier with the New Jersey Devils in February 2013

Without a contract at the start of the NHL's training camp period, he was invited to the New Jersey Devils' training camp in September 2011. Within a month, he accepted an AHL contract with New Jersey's minor league affiliate, the Albany Devils. Bernier was later signed to a one-year, two way contract with the Devils on January 30, 2012.

Bernier joined Ryan Carter, and Stephen Gionta to become one of the most prolific fourth lines in the NHL — known as the CBGB line; they combined for 21 points in 24 games during the 2012 Stanley Cup Playoffs.

However, in Game 6 of the 2012 Stanley Cup Final, Bernier received a five-minute major penalty and a game misconduct for boarding after hitting Los Angeles Kings defenceman Rob Scuderi from behind with 9:50 remaining in the first period. The ensuing five-minute major penalty led to three Kings goals, including the Stanley Cup-winning goal (when a major penalty is assessed, the entire five-minute penalty must be served) and a commanding three-goal advantage over the Devils at the end of the first period. The Kings went on to win the game 6–1, clinching the series and winning the franchise its first Stanley Cup.

==== New York Islanders ====
After four seasons within the Devils organization Bernier left as a free agent, and approaching the 2015-16 season he signed a one-year contract with the New York Islanders on September 17, 2015. He'd appear in 24 games with the club, scoring 6 points. He spent the subsequent season with the team's AHL affiliate, the Bridgeport Sound Tigers.

On June 9, 2017, the team re-signed Bernier to a two-year, two-way contract.

Having conclude his contract with the Islanders following the 2018–19 season, Bernier as a free agent opted to continue within the Islanders organization by agreeing to return for his fourth season with the Bridgeport Sound Tigers on a one-year contract on July 11, 2019.

=== Retirement ===
Bernier would take on a player development role for the Moncton Wildcats in August 2021, effectively ending his playing career.

== International play ==
Medal record

Representing Canada

Ice hockey

IIHF World U18 Championships
Gold medal – first place	2003 Russia	

Ivan Hlinka Memorial Tournament
Gold medal – first place	2002 Slovakia	

Bernier made his first international appearance at the 2001 World U-17 Challenge with Team Quebec. He tallied six points in six games; Quebec failed to medal.

At the under-18 level, he competed at the 2002 Eight Nations Tournament in Slovakia with Team Canada and captured gold. During his second year of major junior with Moncton, Bernier competed in the 2003 World U18 Championships in Russia. He captured his second-straight gold medal with Team Canada in a 3–0 win against Slovakia. He recorded eight points in seven games, finishing second in team scoring behind Marc-Antoine Pouliot.

== Career statistics ==
=== Regular season and playoffs ===
			Regular season					Playoffs
Season	Team	League	GP	G	A	Pts	PIM	GP	G	A	Pts	PIM
1998–99	Quebec AA Aces	QAHA	28	33	23	56	24	—	—	—	—	—
1999–2000	Quebec AA Aces	QAHA	26	12	23	35	42	—	—	—	—	—
2000–01	Ste-Foy Gouverneurs	QMAAA	39	17	35	52	48	16	9	17	26	8
2001–02	Moncton Wildcats	QMJHL	66	31	28	59	51	—	—	—	—	—
2002–03	Moncton Wildcats	QMJHL	71	49	52	101	90	2	1	0	1	2
2003–04	Moncton Wildcats	QMJHL	66	36	46	82	80	20	7	10	17	17
2004–05	Moncton Wildcats	QMJHL	68	35	36	71	114	12	6	13	19	22
2005–06	Cleveland Barons	AHL	49	20	23	43	33	—	—	—	—	—
2005–06	San Jose Sharks	NHL	39	14	13	27	35	11	1	5	6	8
2006–07	Worcester Sharks	AHL	10	3	4	7	2	—	—	—	—	—
2006–07	San Jose Sharks	NHL	62	15	16	31	29	11	0	1	1	2
2007–08	San Jose Sharks	NHL	59	13	10	23	62	—	—	—	—	—
2007–08	Buffalo Sabres	NHL	17	3	6	9	2	—	—	—	—	—
2008–09	Vancouver Canucks	NHL	81	15	17	32	27	10	2	2	4	7
2009–10	Vancouver Canucks	NHL	59	11	11	22	21	12	4	1	5	0
2010–11	Florida Panthers	NHL	68	5	10	15	21	—	—	—	—	—
2011–12	Albany Devils	AHL	17	3	3	6	8	—	—	—	—	—
2011–12	New Jersey Devils	NHL	32	1	5	6	16	24	2	5	7	27
2012–13	New Jersey Devils	NHL	47	8	7	15	17	—	—	—	—	—
2013–14	New Jersey Devils	NHL	78	3	9	12	33	—	—	—	—	—
2014–15	Albany Devils	AHL	9	1	4	5	17	—	—	—	—	—
2014–15	New Jersey Devils	NHL	67	16	16	32	28	—	—	—	—	—
2015–16	New York Islanders	NHL	24	1	5	6	9	6	0	0	0	0
2016–17	Bridgeport Sound Tigers	AHL	33	16	10	26	26	—	—	—	—	—
2017–18	Bridgeport Sound Tigers	AHL	63	21	14	35	36	—	—	—	—	—
2017–18	New York Islanders	NHL	4	0	0	0	0	—	—	—	—	—
2018–19	Bridgeport Sound Tigers	AHL	62	24	18	42	87	5	1	1	2	2
2019–20	Bridgeport Sound Tigers	AHL	20	2	2	4	0	—	—	—	—	—
NHL totals			637	105	125	230	300	74	9	14	23	44

=== International ===
Year	Team	Event	Result	GP	G	A	Pts	PIM
2001	Canada Quebec	U17	5th	4	1	3	4	4
2002	Canada Quebec	U17	4th	6	3	3	6	0
2002	Canada	IH18	1st place, gold medalist(s)	5	0	0	0	4
2003	Canada	WJC18	1st place, gold medalist(s)	7	4	4	8	12
Junior totals				22	8	10	18	20

== Awards ==
- Won the Air Canada Cup with the Gouverneurs de Ste-Foy in 2001.
- Named Air Canada Cup MVP in 2001.
- Named to the QMJHL All-Rookie Team in 2002.
- Named to the CHL Second All-Star Team in 2003.
- Named to the QMJHL Second All-Star Team in 2003 and 2004.
- Won the Fred J. Hume Award (Vancouver Canucks' unsung hero) in 2009.

Awards and achievements
Preceded by Milan Michalek	San Jose Sharks first-round draft pick 2003	Succeeded by Lukáš Kašpar
