= Jan Zapletal =

Czech ice hockey player

- Born: August 21, 1986 (age 39) Hodonín, Czechoslovakia
- Height: 6 ft 3 in (191 cm)
- Weight: 187 lb (85 kg; 13 st 5 lb)
- Position: Defence
- Shot: Left
- Played for: VHK Vsetin; KLH Vajgar Jindřichův Hradec; HC Olomouc; SHK Hodonin; HC Sternberk; HC Breclav; VSK Techniko Blansko; SK Boskovice
- NHL draft: 188th overall, 2004; Tampa Bay Lightning
- Playing career: 2004–2012

Jan Zapletal (born August 21, 1986) is a Czech professional ice hockey player who played in the Czech Extraliga with VHK Vsetín. He was selected by the Tampa Bay Lightning in the 7th round (209th overall) of the 2004 NHL entry draft.

== Career statistics ==
			Regular season					Playoffs
Season	Team	League	GP	G	A	Pts	PIM	GP	G	A	Pts	PIM
2001–02	HC Kometa Brno	CZE U18	18	0	0	0	2	—	—	—	—	—
2001–02	HC Ytong Brno	CZE.2 U18	4	1	1	2	6	—	—	—	—	—
2002–03	HC Vsetín	CZE U18	38	5	7	12	10	10	0	0	0	2
2002–03	HC Vsetín	CZE U20	1	0	0	0	0	—	—	—	—	—
2003–04	Vsetínská hokejová	CZE U20	51	2	4	6	26	4	0	0	0	0
2004–05	Regina Pats	WHL	55	3	2	5	20	—	—	—	—	—
2005–06	Vsetínská hokejová	CZE U20	9	0	3	3	2	—	—	—	—	—
2005–06	KLH Vajgar Jindřichův Hradec	CZE.2 U20
2005–06	Vsetínská hokejová	ELH	16	0	0	0	10	—	—	—	—	—
2005–06	KLH Vajgar Jindřichův Hradec	CZE.2	20	0	0	0	16	—	—	—	—	—
2006–07	VSK Technika Brno	CZE.3	22	1	5	6	32	—	—	—	—	—
2007–08	HC Olomouc	CZE.2	10	0	0	0	10	—	—	—	—	—
2007–08	SHK Hodonín	CZE.3	27	4	5	9	34	3	0	1	1	2
2008–09	HC TJ Šternberk	CZE.3	39	5	7	12	48	5	2	0	2	6
2009–10	HC Břeclav	CZE.3	12	0	1	1	6	—	—	—	—	—
2009–10	VSK Technika Blansko	CZE.3	5	0	0	0	2	—	—	—	—	—
2010–11	SKMB Boskovice	CZE.4
2011–12	SKMB Boskovice	CZE.4	18	5	4	9		—	—	—	—	—
ELH totals			16	0	0	0	10	—	—	—	—	—
CZE.3 totals			105	10	18	28	122	8	2	1	3	8
