= Andrei Mukhachyov =

Russian ice hockey player

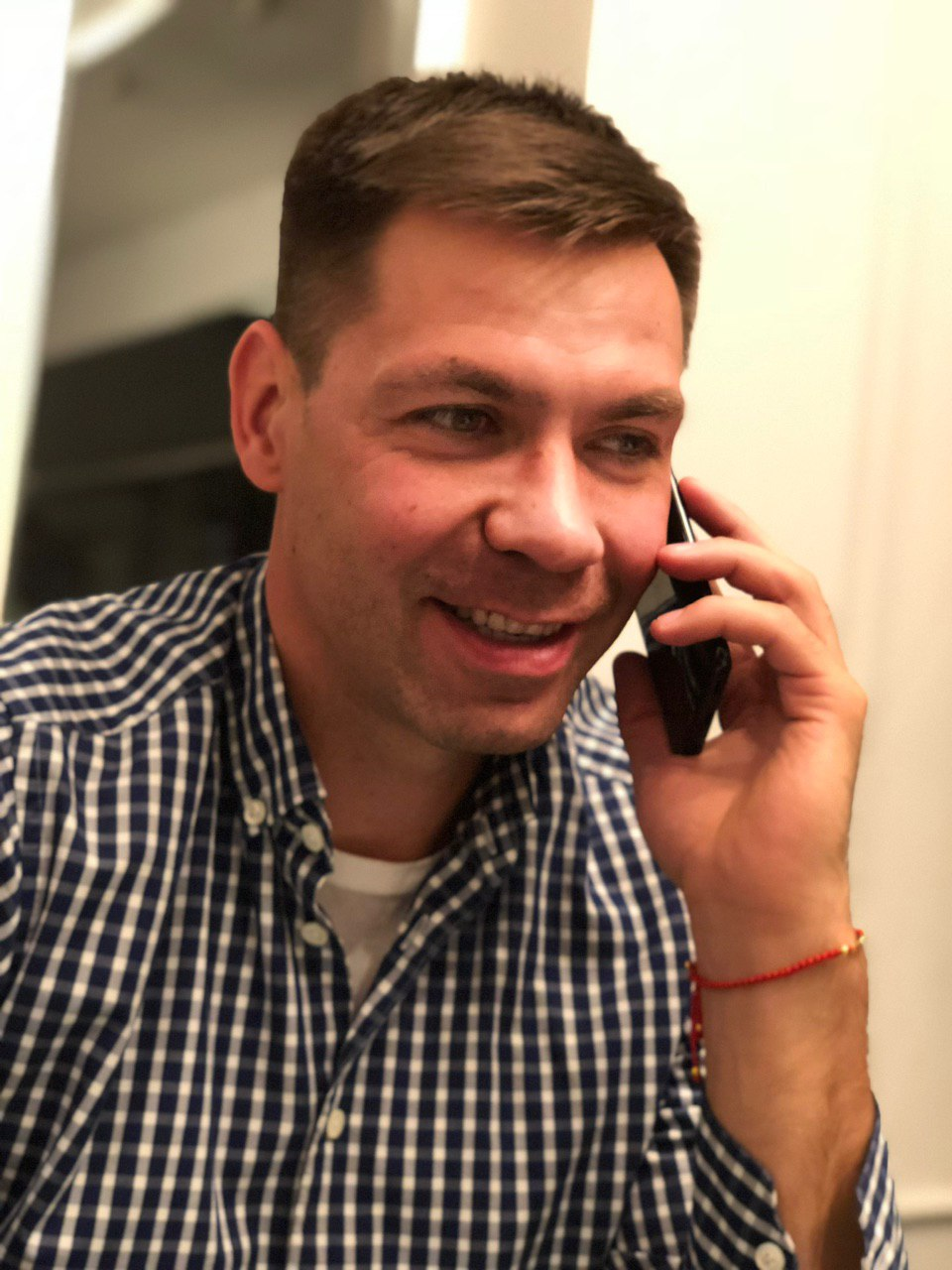
- Andrei Mukhachyov
- Born: 21 July 1980 (age 45) Ekaterinburg, USSR
- Height: 6 ft 3 in (191 cm)
- Weight: 207 lb (94 kg; 14 st 11 lb)
- Position: Defence
- Shot: Left
- Played for: HC CSKA Moscow; Vityaz Chekhov; HC Atlant Moscow Oblast; Ak Bars Kazan; Avangard Omsk; Amur Khabarovsk; Traktor Chelyabinsk; HC CSKA Sofia
- NHL draft: 210th overall, 2003; Nashville Predators
- Playing career: 1998–2015

Andrei Mukhachyov (Russian: Андрей Мухачёв; born 21 July 1980) is a Russian former professional ice hockey defenceman. He was selected by the Nashville Predators in the 7th round (210th overall) of the 2003 NHL entry draft.

Mukhachyov played in the Russian Superleague and the Kontinental Hockey League for HC CSKA Moscow, Vityaz Chekhov, HC Atlant Moscow Oblast, Ak Bars Kazan, Avangard Omsk, Amur Khabarovsk and Traktor Chelyabinsk. He also suited up for Bulgarian team HC CSKA Sofia for the IIHF Continental Cup in 2013 and 2014.

== Career statistics ==
=== Regular season and playoffs ===
			Regular season					Playoffs
Season	Team	League	GP	G	A	Pts	PIM	GP	G	A	Pts	PIM
1996–97	SKA Yekaterinburg	RUS.3	3	0	0	0	0	—	—	—	—	—
1996–97	RTI Yekaterinburg	RUS.4	2	0	0	0	0	—	—	—	—	—
1997–98	Dinamo–Energija–2 Yekaterinburg	RUS.3	18	0	1	1	14	—	—	—	—	—
1998–99	CSKA Moscow	RUS.2	19	0	2	2	12	—	—	—	—	—
1999–2000	CSKA Moscow	RUS.2	40	2	9	11	42	—	—	—	—	—
1999–2000	CSKA–2 Moscow	RUS.3	8	1	5	6	18	—	—	—	—	—
2000–01	CSKA Moscow	RUS.2	39	3	9	12	28	—	—	—	—	—
2001–02	CSKA–2 Moscow	RUS.3	48	8	10	18	79	14	3	5	8	12
2002–03	CSKA Moscow	RSL	50	3	7	10	30	—	—	—	—	—
2003–04	CSKA Moscow	RSL	38	2	3	5	28	—	—	—	—	—
2003–04	CSKA–2 Moscow	RUS.3	2	1	1	2	0	—	—	—	—	—
2004–05	CSKA Moscow	RSL	21	0	2	2	14	—	—	—	—	—
2004–05	CSKA–2 Moscow	RUS.3	24	3	14	17	14	—	—	—	—	—
2005–06	CSKA Moscow	RSL	48	1	5	6	71	7	0	0	0	4
2006–07	Vityaz Chekhov	RSL	51	2	8	10	82	3	0	0	0	2
2007–08	Khimik Moscow Oblast	RSL	47	6	18	24	63	—	—	—	—	—
2008–09	Atlant Moscow Oblast	KHL	28	0	6	6	57	—	—	—	—	—
2008–09	Ak Bars Kazan	KHL	15	0	3	3	18	16	0	2	2	12
2009–10	Ak Bars Kazan	KHL	25	0	2	2	20	19	0	1	1	38
2010–11	Avangard Omsk	KHL	13	1	4	5	12	3	0	0	0	2
2011–12	Amur Khabarovsk	KHL	11	1	1	2	14	4	0	1	1	6
2012–13	Traktor Chelyabinsk	KHL	3	0	0	0	0	—	—	—	—	—
RUS.2 totals			146	13	30	43	161	14	3	5	8	12
RSL totals			255	14	43	57	288	10	0	0	0	6
KHL totals			95	2	16	18	121	42	0	4	4	58

=== International ===
Year	Team	Event	GP	G	A	Pts	PIM
1998	Russia	EJC	6	0	0	0	2
Junior totals			6	0	0	0	2
