= Miroslav Hanuljak =

Czech ice hockey player

- Born: 12 September 1984 (age 41) Most, Czechoslovakia
- Height: 6 ft 2 in (188 cm)
- Weight: 181 lb (82 kg; 12 st 13 lb)
- Position: Goaltender
- Catches: Right
- team Former teams: Free agent HC Plzeň; HC Litvínov; HK Nitra
- NHL draft: 213th overall, 2003; Nashville Predators
- Playing career: 2010–present

Miroslav Hanuljak (born 12 September 1984) is a Czech professional ice hockey goaltender. He was selected by the Nashville Predators in the 7th round (213th overall) of the 2003 NHL entry draft.

Hanuljak previously played with HC Plzeň in the Czech Extraliga during the 2010–11 Czech Extraliga season, with Piráti Chomutov for two seasons from 2012 to 2014 and again during the 2015–16 season and with HC Litvínov in the 2018–19 season where he played two games.
