= Mike Farrell (ice hockey) =

American ice hockey player (born 1978)

- Born: 20 October 1978 (age 47) Edina, Minnesota, U.S.
- Height: 6 ft 0 in (183 cm)
- Weight: 223 lb (101 kg; 15 st 13 lb)
- Position: Right wing
- Shot: Right
- Played for: Nashville Predators; Washington Capitals
- NHL draft: 220th overall, 1998; Washington Capitals
- Playing career: 2000–2004

Michael William Farrell (born October 20, 1978) is an American former professional ice hockey defenseman.

== Early life ==
Farrell was born in Edina, Minnesota, and raised in Carmel, Indiana. While attending Providence College, he was a member of the Providence Friars men's ice hockey team.

== Career ==
Drafted by the Washington Capitals in the 1998 NHL entry draft, Farrell spent several years in the Capitals system before he was traded to the Nashville Predators in 2003. He played 13 games in the NHL with the Capitals and Predators between 2001 and 2004, though mainly played in the minor American Hockey League, retiring in 2004.

== Career statistics ==
=== Regular season and playoffs ===
| | | | Regular season | | | | | Playoffs |
| Season | Team | League | GP | G | A | Pts | PIM | GP | G | A | Pts | PIM |
|---|---|---|---|---|---|---|---|---|---|---|---|---|
| 1995–96 | Culver Military Academy | HS-IN | — | — | — | — | — | — | — | — | — | — |
| 1996–97 | Culver Military Academy | HS-IN | — | — | — | — | — | — | — | — | — | — |
| 1997–98 | Providence College | HE | 33 | 5 | 8 | 13 | 32 | — | — | — | — | — |
| 1998–99 | Providence College | HE | 29 | 3 | 12 | 15 | 51 | — | — | — | — | — |
| 1999–00 | Providence College | HE | 36 | 3 | 6 | 9 | 71 | — | — | — | — | — |
| 1999–00 | Portland Pirates | AHL | 7 | 2 | 0 | 2 | 0 | 4 | 0 | 1 | 1 | 0 |
| 2000–01 | Portland Pirates | AHL | 79 | 6 | 18 | 24 | 61 | 3 | 0 | 2 | 2 | 2 |
| 2001–02 | Washington Capitals | NHL | 8 | 0 | 0 | 0 | 0 | — | — | — | — | — |
| 2001–02 | Portland Pirates | AHL | 61 | 12 | 15 | 27 | 62 | — | — | — | — | — |
| 2002–03 | Washington Capitals | NHL | 4 | 0 | 0 | 0 | 2 | — | — | — | — | — |
| 2002–03 | Portland Pirates | AHL | 68 | 12 | 12 | 24 | 107 | 3 | 0 | 1 | 1 | 0 |
| 2003–04 | Nashville Predators | NHL | 1 | 0 | 0 | 0 | 0 | — | — | — | — | — |
| 2003–04 | Milwaukee Admirals | AHL | 49 | 10 | 8 | 18 | 66 | 19 | 1 | 1 | 2 | 13 |
| AHL totals | | | 264 | 42 | 53 | 95 | 296 | 29 | 1 | 5 | 6 | 15 |
| NHL totals | | | 13 | 0 | 0 | 0 | 2 | — | — | — | — | — |
