= 2002–03 OHL season =

Junior ice hockey season

The 2002–03 OHL season was the 23rd season of the Ontario Hockey League. The North Bay Centennials relocated to Saginaw, Michigan, becoming the Saginaw Spirit. Due to the move, several teams changed divisions; the Saginaw Spirit were placed in the west division, the London Knights moved to the midwest division, and the Brampton Battalion moved to the central division. The London Knights moved into the new John Labatt Centre, which replaced the London Ice House. The Tim Adams Memorial Trophy was inaugurated as the MVP of the OHL Cup. Twenty teams each played 68 games. The Mississauga Icedogs qualified for the playoffs for the first time in their existence. The Kitchener Rangers won the J. Ross Robertson Cup, defeating the Ottawa 67's in the final.

== Regular season ==
=== Final standings ===
Note: DIV = Division; GP = Games played; W = Wins; L = Losses; T = Ties; OTL = Overtime losses; GF = Goals for; GA = Goals against; PTS = Points; x = clinched playoff berth; y = clinched division title; z = clinched conference title

=== Eastern conference ===
Rank	Team	DIV	GP	W	L	T	OTL	PTS	GF	GA
1	z-Ottawa 67's	East	68	44	14	7	3	98	318	210
2	y-Brampton Battalion	Central	68	34	24	6	4	78	239	202
3	x-Peterborough Petes	East	68	32	22	11	3	78	222	215
4	x-Toronto St. Michael's Majors	Central	68	32	24	7	5	76	207	214
5	x-Belleville Bulls	East	68	33	27	6	2	74	195	200
6	x-Oshawa Generals	East	68	34	30	2	2	72	243	225
7	x-Barrie Colts	Central	68	29	26	4	9	71	228	223
8	x-Mississauga IceDogs	Central	68	23	31	11	3	60	212	231
9	Kingston Frontenacs	East	68	25	37	2	4	56	222	287
10	Sudbury Wolves	Central	68	16	46	4	2	38	175	273

=== Western conference ===
Rank	Team	DIV	GP	W	L	T	OTL	PTS	GF	GA
1	z-Kitchener Rangers	Midwest	68	46	14	5	3	100	275	188
2	y-Plymouth Whalers	West	68	43	14	9	2	97	259	174
3	x-Sarnia Sting	West	68	41	19	7	1	90	251	193
4	x-Windsor Spitfires	West	68	37	25	5	1	80	259	221
5	x-London Knights	Midwest	68	31	27	7	3	72	220	205
6	x-Guelph Storm	Midwest	68	29	28	9	2	69	217	208
7	x-Owen Sound Attack	Midwest	68	27	30	7	4	65	206	243
8	x-Sault Ste. Marie Greyhounds	West	68	26	33	6	3	61	232	284
9	Erie Otters	Midwest	68	24	35	6	3	57	181	248
10	Saginaw Spirit	West	68	11	45	5	7	34	158	275

=== Scoring leaders ===
Player	Team	GP	G	A	Pts	PIM
Corey Locke	Ottawa 67's	66	63	88	151	83
Matt Foy	Ottawa 67's	68	61	71	132	112
Chad LaRose	Plymouth Whalers	67	61	56	117	52
Joey Tenute	Sarnia Sting	68	41	71	112	75
Kyle Wellwood	Windsor Spitfires	57	41	59	100	20
Jamie Johnson	Oshawa Generals	68	24	76	100	34
Eric Staal	Peterborough Petes	66	39	59	98	36
Matt Stajan	Belleville Bulls	57	34	60	94	75
Kris Newbury	Sarnia Sting	64	34	58	92	149
Brandon Nolan	Oshawa Generals	68	36	52	88	57

== Playoffs ==
Conference quarterfinals
E1	Ottawa	4
E8	Mississauga	1
E3	Peterborough	3
E6	Oshawa	4
E4	Toronto	4
E5	Belleville	3
E2	Brampton	4
E7	Barrie	2
W1	Kitchener	4
W8	S.S. Marie	0
W3	Sarnia	2
W6	Guelph	4
W4	Windsor	3
W5	London	4
W2	Plymouth	4
W7	Owen Sound	0

Conference semifinals
E1	Ottawa	4
E6	Oshawa	2
E4	Toronto	4
E2	Brampton	1
W1	Kitchener	4
W6	Guelph	1
W5	London	3
W2	Plymouth	4

Conference finals
E1	Ottawa	4
E4	Toronto	3
W1	Kitchener	4
W2	Plymouth	3

Finals
E1	Ottawa	1
W1	Kitchener	4

=== Conference quarterfinals ===
==== Eastern conference ====
Ottawa (1) vs. Mississauga (8)
Date	Away	Home	
March 21	Mississauga 3	4 Ottawa	OT
March 23	Mississauga 3	8 Ottawa	
March 24	Ottawa 7	4 Mississauga	
March 25	Ottawa 4	5 Mississauga	OT
March 29	Mississauga 3	6 Ottawa	
Ottawa wins series 4–1

Peterborough (3) vs. Oshawa (6)
Date	Away	Home	
March 20	Oshawa 3	2 Peterborough	OT
March 21	Peterborough 6	5 Oshawa	OT
March 24	Oshawa 4	5 Peterborough	OT
March 25	Peterborough 0	3 Oshawa	
March 27	Oshawa 2	5 Peterborough	
March 31	Peterborough 1	3 Oshawa	
April 1	Oshawa 4	3 Peterborough	OT
Oshawa wins series 4–3

Brampton (2) vs. Barrie (7)
Date	Away	Home	
March 20	Barrie 2	3 Brampton	OT
March 22	Brampton 2	4 Barrie	
March 23	Barrie 4	5 Brampton	
March 25	Brampton 1	0 Barrie	
March 27	Barrie 3	1 Brampton	
March 29	Brampton 2	1 Barrie	
Brampton wins series 4–2

Toronto (4) vs. Belleville (5)
Date	Away	Home
March 23	Belleville 4	6 Toronto
March 24	Toronto 1	4 Belleville
March 27	Belleville 3	6 Toronto
March 28	Toronto 2	4 Belleville
March 30	Belleville 2	6 Toronto
March 31	Toronto 1	6 Belleville
April 1	Belleville 1	3 Toronto
Toronto wins series 4–3

==== Western conference ====
Kitchener (1) vs. Sault Ste. Marie (8)
Date	Away	Home
March 21	Sault Ste. Marie 0	3 Kitchener
March 22	Sault Ste. Marie 0	4 Kitchener
March 25	Kitchener 2	1 Sault Ste. Marie
March 26	Kitchener 4	2 Sault Ste. Marie
Kitchener wins series 4–0

Sarnia (3) vs. Guelph (6)
Date	Away	Home
March 21	Guelph 5	2 Sarnia
March 23	Sarnia 5	7 Guelph
March 26	Guelph 0	1 Sarnia
March 28	Sarnia 1	6 Guelph
March 29	Guelph 0	3 Sarnia
March 31	Sarnia 1	9 Guelph
Guelph wins series 4–2

Plymouth (2) vs. Owen Sound (7)
Date	Away	Home
March 22	Owen Sound 3	6 Plymouth
March 23	Plymouth 6	3 Owen Sound
March 25	Owen Sound 4	6 Plymouth
March 27	Plymouth 5	2 Owen Sound
Plymouth wins series 4–0

Windsor (4) vs. London (5)
Date	Away	Home	
March 20	London 3	2 Windsor	
March 21	Windsor 4	1 London	
March 23	London 6	7 Windsor	OT
March 26	Windsor 1	2 London	
March 28	London 5	3 Windsor	
March 31	Windsor 3	2 London	
April 1	London 7	4 Windsor	
London wins series 4–3

=== Conference semifinals ===
Eastern conference

Ottawa (1) vs. Oshawa (6)
Date	Away	Home
April 4	Ottawa 2	3 Oshawa
April 6	Oshawa 3	4 Ottawa
April 7	Oshawa 1	8 Ottawa
April 9	Ottawa 5	7 Oshawa
April 11	Oshawa 1	7 Ottawa
April 13	Ottawa 6	0 Oshawa
Ottawa wins series 4–2

Brampton (2) vs. Toronto (4)
Date	Away	Home	
April 4	Toronto 0	7 Brampton	
April 6	Brampton 1	4 Toronto	
April 8	Toronto 4	3 Brampton	OT
April 10	Brampton 1	4 Toronto	
April 11	Toronto 6	3 Brampton	
Toronto wins series 4–1

Western conference

Kitchener (1) vs. Guelph (6)
Date	Away	Home	
April 4	Guelph 3	4 Kitchener	
April 6	Kitchener 6	2 Guelph	
April 8	Guelph 5	4 Kitchener	
April 10	Kitchener 4	1 Guelph	
April 11	Guelph 4	5 Kitchener	OT
Kitchener wins series 4–1

Plymouth (2) vs. London (5)
Date	Away	Home	
April 5	London 3	2 Plymouth	
April 6	Plymouth 2	1 London	
April 8	London 4	3 Plymouth	
April 9	Plymouth 3	2 London	OT
April 11	London 3	6 Plymouth	
April 12	Plymouth 1	5 London	
April 14	London 2	4 Plymouth	
Plymouth wins series 4–3

=== Conference finals ===
Eastern conference

Ottawa (1) vs. Toronto (4)
Date	Away	Home	
April 18	Toronto 3	0 Ottawa	
April 20	Ottawa 1	2 Toronto	
April 22	Toronto 0	6 Ottawa	
April 24	Ottawa 4	2 Toronto	
April 25	Toronto 6	2 Ottawa	
April 27	Ottawa 3	2 Toronto	OT
April 28	Toronto 2	5 Ottawa	
Ottawa wins series 4–3

Western conference

Kitchener (1) vs. Plymouth (2)
Date	Away	Home	
April 16	Plymouth 3	1 Kitchener	
April 18	Kitchener 6	1 Plymouth	
April 20	Plymouth 2	3 Kitchener	
April 22	Kitchener 2	3 Plymouth	
April 24	Plymouth 2	1 Kitchener	OT
April 26	Kitchener 7	4 Plymouth	
April 28	Plymouth 1	3 Kitchener	
Kitchener wins series 4–3

=== J. Ross Robertson Cup finals ===
Kitchener (1) vs. Ottawa (1)
Date	Away	Home	
May 2	Ottawa 3	2 Kitchener	OT
May 4	Kitchener 4	3 Ottawa	OT
May 6	Ottawa 1	4 Kitchener	
May 8	Kitchener 4	3 Ottawa	OT
May 10	Ottawa 1	4 Kitchener	
Kitchener wins series 4–1

=== J. Ross Robertson Cup Champions Roster ===
2002-03 Kitchener Rangers
Goaltenders: (Canada) 33 – Carlo DiRienzo; (Canada) 40 – Scott Dickie	Defencemen: (Canada) 2 – Matt McCann; (Canada) 3 – Matt Manias; (Czech Republic) 5 – Jiří Višenka; (Canada) 6 – Thomas Harrison; (United States) 7 – Nick Duff; (Canada) 8 – Steve Eminger; (Canada) 16 – Andre Benoit; (Canada) 21 – George Halkidis; (Canada) 25 – Markus Smith; (Canada) 26 – T.J. Eason	Wingers: (Canada) 4 – Gregory Campbell; (Czech Republic) 9 – Petr Kanko; (Canada) 10 – Jesse Boucher; (Canada) 12 – Paul McFarland; (Canada) 13 – Mike Chmielewski; (Canada) 24 – Rafal Martynowski; (Canada) 27 – Adam Keefe; (Canada) 38 – Nathan O'Nabigon	Centres: (Canada) 11 – Matt Grennier; (Canada) 14 – Derek Roy - C; (Canada) 15 – Cam Fergus; (Canada) 17 – David Clarkson; (Canada) 18 – Mike Richards; (Canada) 19 – Evan McGrath; (Canada) 20 – David Frawley; (Canada) 39 – Chad McCaffrey; Coach: (Canada) Peter DeBoer; General Manager: (Canada) Peter DeBoer

== All-Star teams ==
=== First team ===
- Corey Locke, Centre, Ottawa 67's
- Cody McCormick, Left Wing, Belleville Bulls
- Matt Foy, Right Wing, Ottawa 67's
- Brendan Bell, Defence, Ottawa 67's
- Lukas Krajicek, Defence, Peterborough Petes
- Andy Chiodo, Goaltender, Toronto St. Michael's Majors
- Brian Kilrea, Coach, Ottawa 67's

=== Second team ===
- Eric Staal, Centre, Peterborough Petes
- Brandon Nolan, Left Wing, Oshawa Generals
- Chad LaRose, Right Wing, Plymouth Whalers
- Steve Eminger, Defence, Kitchener Rangers
- Carlo Colaiacovo, Defence, Erie Otters
- Chris Houle, Goaltender, London Knights
- Jim Hulton, Coach, Belleville Bulls

=== Third team ===
- Matt Stajan, Centre, Belleville Bulls
- Kris Newbury, Left Wing, Sarnia Sting
- Dustin Brown, Right Wing, Guelph Storm
- Trevor Daley, Defence, Sault Ste. Marie Greyhounds
- Tim Gleason, Defence, Windsor Spitfires
- Michael Mole, Goaltender, Belleville Bulls
- Peter DeBoer, Coach, Kitchener Rangers

== Awards ==
J. Ross Robertson Cup:	Kitchener Rangers
Hamilton Spectator Trophy:	Kitchener Rangers
Bobby Orr Trophy:	Ottawa 67's
Wayne Gretzky Trophy:	Kitchener Rangers
Leyden Trophy:	Ottawa 67's
Emms Trophy:	Brampton Battalion
Holody Trophy:	Kitchener Rangers
Bumbacco Trophy:	Plymouth Whalers
Red Tilson Trophy:	Corey Locke, Ottawa 67's
Eddie Powers Memorial Trophy:	Corey Locke, Ottawa 67's
Matt Leyden Trophy:	Brian Kilrea, Ottawa 67's
Jim Mahon Memorial Trophy:	Matt Foy, Ottawa 67's
Max Kaminsky Trophy:	Brendan Bell, Ottawa 67's
OHL Goaltender of the Year:	Andy Chiodo, Toronto St. Michael's Majors
Jack Ferguson Award:	Patrick McNeill, Saginaw Spirit
Dave Pinkney Trophy:	Paul Drew and Jeff Weber, Plymouth Whalers
OHL Executive of the Year:	Steve Bienkowski, Kitchener Rangers
Bill Long Award:	Norm Bryan, Peterborough Petes
Emms Family Award:	Rob Schremp, Mississauga IceDogs
F.W. 'Dinty' Moore Trophy:	Ryan Munce, Sarnia Sting
OHL Humanitarian of the Year:	Michael Mole, Belleville Bulls
William Hanley Trophy:	Kyle Wellwood, Windsor Spitfires
Leo Lalonde Memorial Trophy:	Chad Larose, Plymouth Whalers
Bobby Smith Trophy:	Dustin Brown, Guelph Storm
Tim Adams Memorial Trophy:	Jhase Sniderman, Toronto Young Nats
Wayne Gretzky 99 Award:	Derek Roy, Kitchener Rangers

== 2003 OHL Priority Selection ==
On May 3, 2003, the OHL conducted the 2003 Ontario Hockey League Priority Selection. The Saginaw Spirit held the first overall pick in the draft, and selected Patrick McNeill from the Strathroy Rockets. McNeill was awarded the Jack Ferguson Award, awarded to the top pick in the draft.

Below are the players who were selected in the first round of the 2003 Ontario Hockey League Priority Selection.

#	Player	Nationality	OHL Team	Hometown	Minor Team
1	Patrick McNeill (D)	Canada	Saginaw Spirit	Strathroy, Ontario	Strathroy Rockets
2	Marc Staal (D)	Canada	Sudbury Wolves	Thunder Bay, Ontario	Thunder Bay Kings
3	Tony Rizzi (RW)	Canada	Kingston Frontenacs	Kingston, Ontario	Wellington Dukes
4	Ryan O'Marra (C)	Canada	Erie Otters	Mississauga, Ontario	Mississauga Senators
5	Cody Bass (C)	Canada	Mississauga IceDogs	Guelph, Ontario	Guelph Hurricanes
6	Chris Lawrence (RW)	Canada	Sault Ste. Marie Greyhounds	Toronto, Ontario	Toronto Marlboros
7	Bobby Ryan (LW)	United States	Owen Sound Attack	Collingswood, New Jersey	Detroit Honeybaked
8	Ryan Parent (D)	Canada	Guelph Storm	Sioux Lookout, Ontario	Waterloo Siskins
9	Steve Spade (D)	United States	Barrie Colts	Rochester, New York	Georgetown Raiders
10	Tom Mannino (D)	United States	London Knights	Farmington Hills, Michigan	Leamington Flyers
11	Justin Wallingford (D)	Canada	Oshawa Generals	Hamilton, Ontario	Hamilton Jr. Bulldogs
12	Mike Roelofsen (C)	Canada	Belleville Bulls	Chatham, Ontario	Dresden Kings
13	Cal Clutterbuck (RW)	Canada	Toronto St. Michael's Majors	Welland, Ontario	Welland Jr. Canadians
14	Daniel Ryder (C)	Canada	Peterborough Petes	St. John's, Newfoundland	Tri-Pen Ospreys
15	Philip Oreskovic (D)	Canada	Brampton Battalion	Brampton, Ontario	Toronto Nationals
16	Steve Downie (RW)	Canada	Windsor Spitfires	Queensville, Ontario	Aurora Tigers
17	Trevor Solomon (D)	Canada	Sarnia Sting	Garden River, Ontario	Sault Ste. Marie North Stars
18	Michael Lombardi (LW)	Canada	Plymouth Whalers	Richmond Hill, Ontario	Vaughan Kings
19	Elgin Reid (D)	Canada	Ottawa 67's	Milton, Ontario	Leamington Flyers
20	Devereaux Heshmatpour (D)	Canada	Kitchener Rangers	North York, Ontario	Vaughan Vipers

== 2003 CHL Import Draft ==
On June 26, 2003, the Canadian Hockey League conducted the 2003 CHL Import Draft, in which teams in all three CHL leagues participate in. The Owen Sound Attack held the first pick in the draft by a team in the OHL, and selected Štefan Ružička from Slovakia with their selection.

Below are the players who were selected in the first round by Ontario Hockey League teams in the 2003 CHL Import Draft.

#	Player	Nationality	OHL Team	Hometown	Minor Team
3	Štefan Ružička (LW)	Slovakia	Owen Sound Attack	Nitra, Slovakia	Nitra Jr.
6	Patrick Ehelechner (G)	Germany	Sudbury Wolves	Rosenheim, Germany	Hannover Scorpions
9	Václav Meidl (C)	Czech Republic	Plymouth Whalers	Havířov, Czech Republic	Havířov Jr.
12	Ilya Yakolev (C)	Russia	Erie Otters	Chelyabinsk, Russia	Chelyabinsk Traktor-2
15	Ivan Khomutov (C/LW)	Russia	London Knights	Saratov, Russia	Moscow HC CSKA
18	Martin Tůma (D)	Czech Republic	Sault Ste. Marie Greyhounds	Most, Czech Republic	Litvínov Chemopetrol Jr.
21	Michal Pešek (LW	Czech Republic	Toronto St. Michael's Majors	Prague, Czech Republic	Sparta Prague Jr.
24	Andy Reiss (D)	Germany	Oshawa Generals	Hannover, Germany	Hannover Scorpions
27	Lukáš Bolf (D)	Czech Republic	Barrie Colts	Vrchlabí, Czech Republic	Sparta Prague Jr.
30	Vadim Karaga (LW)	Belarus	London Knights	Novopolotsk, Belarus	Novopolotsk Polimir
33	David Halasz (D)	Slovakia	Ottawa 67's	Kosice, Slovakia	Kosice Jr.
36	Milan Hluchý (C/LW)	Czech Republic	Belleville Bulls	Rakovník, Czech Republic	Kladno Jr.
39	Igor Mirnov (RW)	Russia	Toronto St. Michael's Majors	Chita, Russia	Moscow Dynamo
42	Martin Lučka (D)	Czech Republic	Peterborough Petes	Zlín, Czech Republic	Zlín Jr.
45	Stefan Blaho (RW)	Slovakia	Sudbury Wolves	Trenčín, Slovakia	Trenčín Jr.
48	Vasili Sysa (D)	Russia	Windsor Spitfires	Chelyabinsk, Russia	Ufa Salavat Yulayev-2
50	Boris Valábik (D)	Slovakia	Kitchener Rangers	Nitra, Slovakia	Nitra Jr.
52	Vojtěch Kloz (D)	Czech Republic	Kingston Frontenacs	Karlovy Vary, Czech Republic	Chicago Steel
54	Miloš Schejbal (LW)	Czech Republic	Kingston Frontenacs	Soběslav, Czech Republic	Sparta Prague Jr.
56	Jakub Čech (G)	Czech Republic	Sault Ste. Marie Greyhounds	Olomouc, Czech Republic	Havířov

== See also ==
- List of OHA Junior A standings
- List of OHL seasons
- 2003 Memorial Cup
- 2003 NHL entry draft
- 2002 in sports
- 2003 in sports

Preceded by 2001–02 OHL season	OHL seasons	Succeeded by 2003–04 OHL season
