= Brandon Nolan =

Canadian ice hockey player

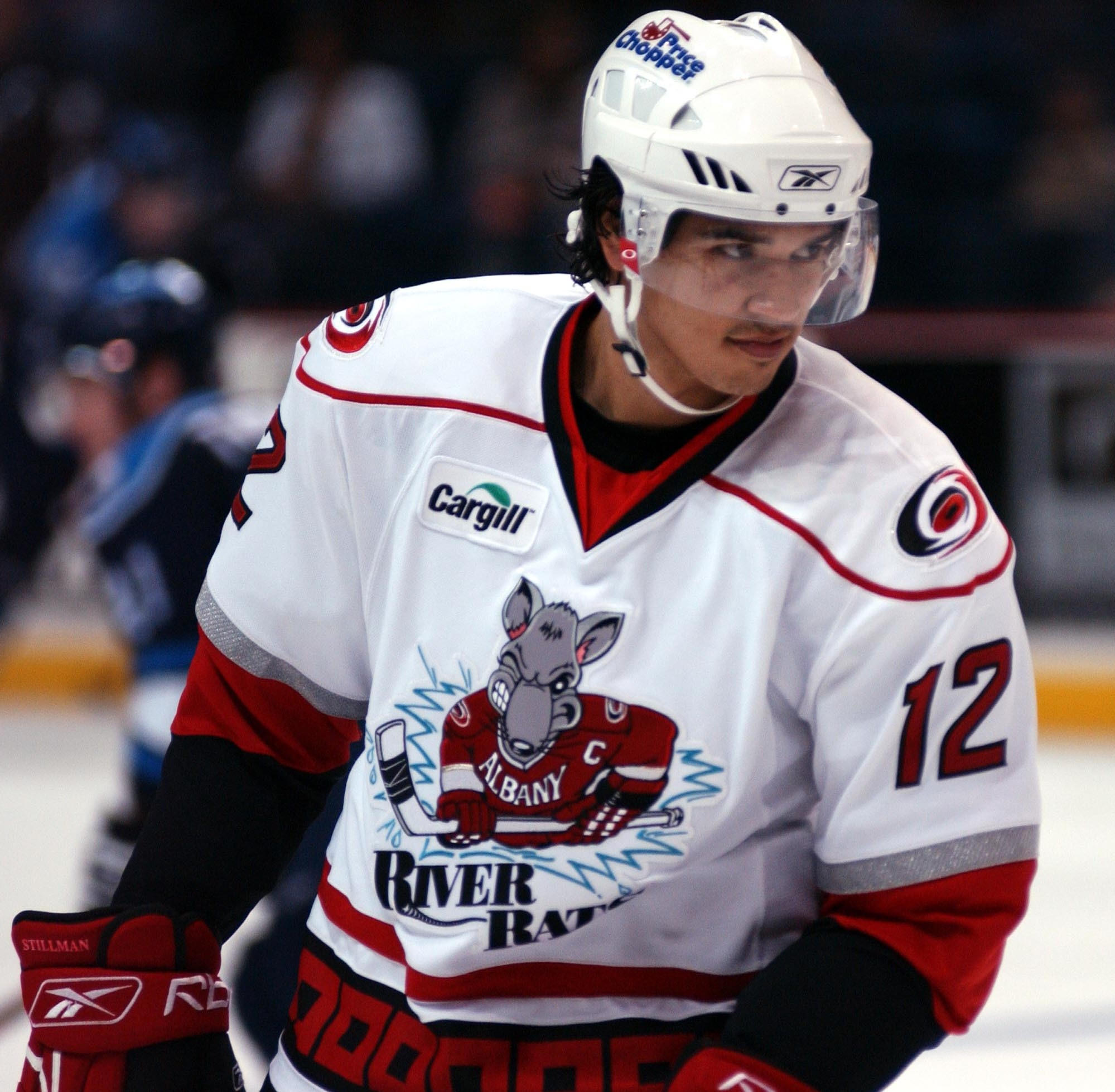
- Nolan with the Albany River Rats in 2007
- Born: July 18, 1983 (age 41); St. Catharines, Ontario, Canada
- Height: 6 ft 1 in (185 cm)
- Weight: 190 lb (86 kg; 13 st 8 lb)
- Position: Centre
- Shot: Left
- Played for: Carolina Hurricanes
- NHL draft: 72nd overall, 2001; New Jersey Devils; 111th overall, 2003; Vancouver Canucks
- Playing career: 2003–2008

Brandon Nolan (born July 18, 1983) is a Canadian actor and former professional ice hockey centre who is a member of the Ojibwe group of Indigenous Peoples from the Garden River First Nations in Northern Ontario. He last played for the Carolina Hurricanes of the National Hockey League (NHL).

He is the son of Sandra Nolan and former NHL player and NHL coach Ted Nolan who received the Jack Adams Award in 1997. His brother Jordan Nolan also played hockey in the NHL.

== Playing career ==
By the end of Nolan's three-year Ontario Hockey League (OHL) career with the Oshawa Generals, he finished with 81 goals and 103 assists, eventually becoming the top scorer during his three years of playing. Nolan was called up from the Albany River Rats on December 21, 2007, due to the Carolina Hurricanes forward Chad LaRose being placed on injured reserve. In his first NHL game versus the Tampa Bay Lightning, Nolan earned his first NHL point with an assist on an Andrew Ladd goal in the first period. On December 28, he was reassigned to the River Rats. Since that time, he was recalled multiple times from Albany to fill in roster spots on the Hurricanes as injuries were taking their toll on the team.

Nolan missed the entire 2008–09 season with a concussion, and was subsequently released from the Carolina Hurricanes.

== Post-playing career ==
Since his retirement from ice hockey Nolan has been involved in charity and other work:[independent source needed] [No significant coverage]

- advisor for community and client relations with Ishkonigan Incorporated, an alternative dispute resolution firm in Akwesasne, Ontario
- hockey scout with the Rochester Americans
- Research analyst with the Assembly of First Nations

After the end of Nolan's career and being gone for two years due to a concussion, he attended Durham College and graduated with an advanced diploma in Business Administration and Marketing.[independent source needed] Upon completing his studies, he created and ran a business alongside his father and brother, 3NOLANS First Nation Hockey School. This hockey camp was intended to inspire the lives of First Nation adolescence across Canada and to make a hockey skills camp available for youth.[independent source needed] Nolan is also the Vice president of the Ted Nolan Foundation, whose aim is to send Aboriginal youths to leadership camps.[independent source needed]

He and his brother Jordan both have a recurring role as ice hockey players called Jim in the 2022 television series Shoresy.

== Career statistics ==
			Regular season					Playoffs
Season	Team	League	GP	G	A	Pts	PIM	GP	G	A	Pts	PIM
1999–2000	St. Catharines Falcons	GHL	47	18	13	31	10	—	—	—	—	—
2000–01	Oshawa Generals	OHL	52	15	23	38	21	—	—	—	—	—
2001–02	Oshawa Generals	OHL	57	30	28	58	78	5	2	4	6	4
2002–03	Oshawa Generals	OHL	68	36	52	88	57	13	10	7	17	4
2003–04	Manitoba Moose	AHL	48	7	10	17	18	—	—	—	—	—
2003–04	Columbia Inferno	ECHL	19	5	10	15	38	3	0	1	1	17
2004–05	Manitoba Moose	AHL	48	4	8	12	16	—	—	—	—	—
2005–06	Manitoba Moose	AHL	18	3	8	11	10	—	—	—	—	—
2005–06	Columbia Inferno	ECHL	43	20	31	51	94	—	—	—	—	—
2006–07	Bridgeport Sound Tigers	AHL	40	9	13	22	59	—	—	—	—	—
2006–07	Växjö Lakers	Allsv	19	6	10	16	44	—	—	—	—	—
2007–08	Albany River Rats	AHL	48	22	26	48	72	—	—	—	—	—
2007–08	Carolina Hurricanes	NHL	6	0	1	1	0	—	—	—	—	—
AHL totals			202	45	65	110	175	—	—	—	—	—
NHL totals			6	0	1	1	0	—	—	—	—	—

== Awards and honours ==
- Nolan received awards, including the National Aboriginal Achievement Award for academic excellence.
