= Shawn Belle =

Canadian ice hockey player (born 1985)

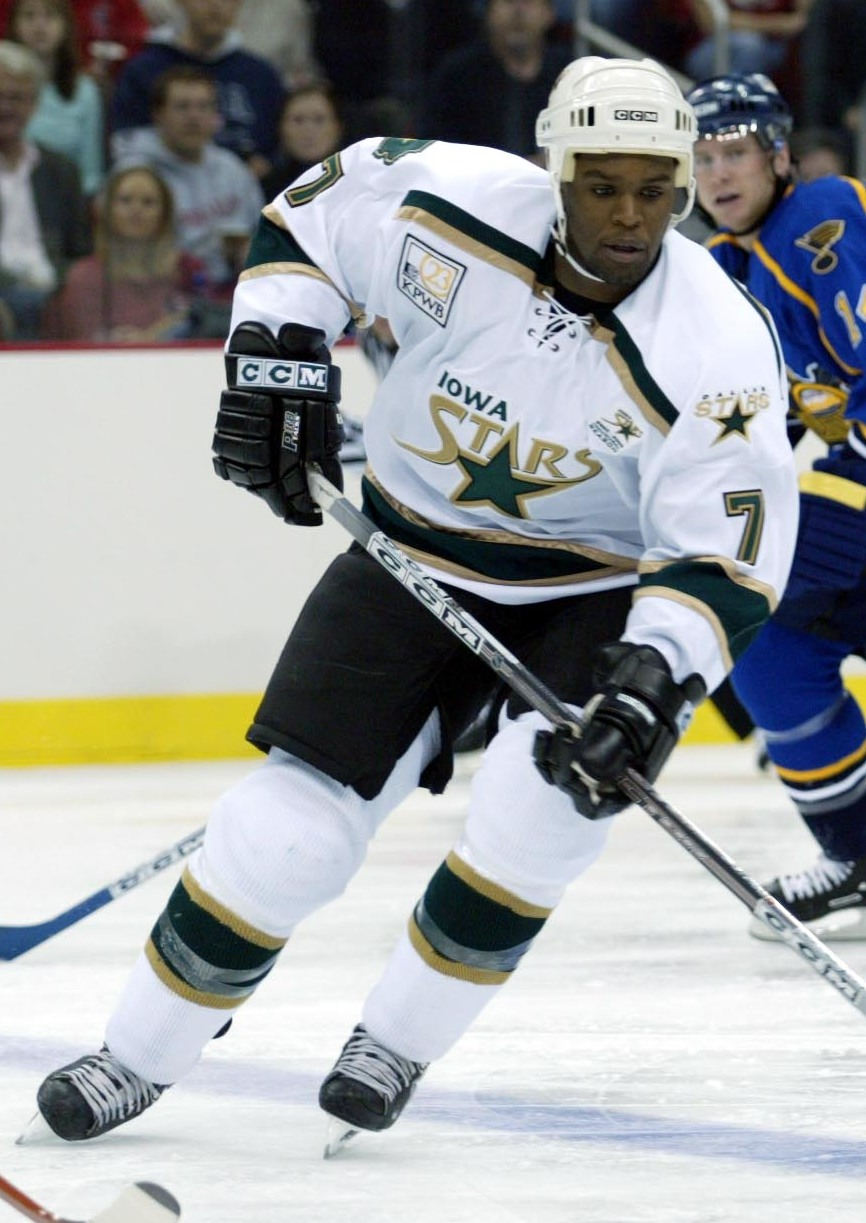
- Belle with the Iowa Stars during the 2005-06 season
- Born: January 3, 1985 (age 41) Edmonton, Alberta, Canada
- Height: 6 ft 1 in (185 cm)
- Weight: 235 lb (107 kg; 16 st 11 lb)
- Position: Defence
- Shot: Left
- Played for: Minnesota Wild; Montreal Canadiens; Edmonton Oilers; Colorado Avalanche; Adler Mannheim; Färjestad BK; Düsseldorfer EG
- NHL draft: 30th overall, 2003; St. Louis Blues
- Playing career: 2005–2015

Shawn James Robert Belle (born January 3, 1985) is a Canadian former professional ice hockey defenceman who played in the National Hockey League (NHL) with the Minnesota Wild, Montreal Canadiens, Edmonton Oilers and the Colorado Avalanche.

== Playing career ==
As a youth, Belle played in the 1998 Quebec International Pee-Wee Hockey Tournament with a minor ice hockey team from Edmonton.

Belle was a highly touted prospect playing for the Tri-City Americans of the Western Hockey League (WHL) when he was drafted by the St. Louis Blues in the 1st round, 30th overall in the 2003 NHL entry draft. After being drafted, Belle returned to the Americans and played for 2 more years there. Belle has spent time with Team Canada’s junior program. He has played on the U-18 gold medal teams in 2003 as well as the U-20 team in 2003 and 2004. He also participated in the 2003 and 2004 Canada-Russia Challenge, while representing Team WHL and represented North America in the America Japan challenge.

Japan led 6-4 in the challenge before Belle's goal sparked a 4-goal burst by North America, who won in a final score of 8-7. The next year Belle's penalty in triple OT cost North America as they fell 1-0.

During the 2004–2005 season, Belle was traded to the Dallas Stars. For the 2005–2006 season, Belle turned pro and joined the Stars minor league affiliate, the Iowa Stars. He played 45 games with the Stars before being traded to the Minnesota Wild and joining their affiliate, the Houston Aeros, for the remainder of the season. For the 2006–2007 season, Belle played the majority of the year with the Aeros but also made his NHL debut with the Wild, skating in 9 games and recording 1 assist.

On July 11, 2008, Belle was traded to the Montreal Canadiens for forward Corey Locke.

After two seasons within the Canadiens organization, Belle signed as a free agent to a one-year contract with his hometown team, the Edmonton Oilers on July 13, 2010. On February 28, 2011, Belle was traded by the Oilers to the Colorado Avalanche in exchange for defenceman Kevin Montgomery.

Belle signed a contract abroad as a free agent with Adler Mannheim of the German DEL on September 10, 2011.

After two seasons in Mannheim, Belle signed a one-year contract in the Swedish Hockey League with Färjestad BK on June 10, 2013.

On June 16, 2014, Belle continued his European journey in signing a one-year contract in the Kontinental Hockey League with Croatian team KHL Medveščak Zagreb. Before the 2014–15 season, he was released from his contract without appearing for the club due to a pre-existing injury on August 31, 2014. On November 10, 2014, having recovered to full health, Belle made a return to Germany in signing for the remainder of the season with Düsseldorfer EG.

On July 23, 2015, Belle signalled the end of his professional playing career, by agreeing to an assistant coach role with the Sherwood Park Crusaders of the Alberta Junior Hockey League.

== Personal life ==
Belle is of Barbadian descent through his father.

== Career statistics ==
=== Regular season and playoffs ===
			Regular season					Playoffs
Season	Team	League	GP	G	A	Pts	PIM	GP	G	A	Pts	PIM
2000–01	Regina Pats	WHL	4	0	3	3	0	—	—	—	—	—
2000–01	Tri–City Americans	WHL	2	0	1	1	0	—	—	—	—	—
2001–02	Tri–City Americans	WHL	64	1	17	18	51	5	2	1	3	2
2002–03	Tri–City Americans	WHL	66	7	14	21	77	—	—	—	—	—
2003–04	Tri–City Americans	WHL	55	9	20	29	68	11	3	5	8	15
2004–05	Tri–City Americans	WHL	62	13	32	45	76	5	1	1	2	6
2005–06	Iowa Stars	AHL	45	1	2	3	63	—	—	—	—	—
2005–06	Houston Aeros	AHL	16	1	1	2	18	8	1	0	1	4
2006–07	Houston Aeros	AHL	57	4	14	18	73	—	—	—	—	—
2006–07	Minnesota Wild	NHL	9	0	1	1	0	—	—	—	—	—
2007–08	Houston Aeros	AHL	63	1	2	3	74	3	0	0	0	2
2008–09	Hamilton Bulldogs	AHL	60	3	10	13	93	6	1	0	1	16
2009–10	Hamilton Bulldogs	AHL	70	3	16	19	69	19	1	6	7	20
2009–10	Montreal Canadiens	NHL	2	0	0	0	0	—	—	—	—	—
2010–11	Oklahoma City Barons	AHL	39	3	17	20	61	—	—	—	—	—
2010–11	Edmonton Oilers	NHL	5	0	0	0	0	—	—	—	—	—
2010–11	Lake Erie Monsters	AHL	12	3	3	6	8	7	0	3	3	8
2010–11	Colorado Avalanche	NHL	4	0	0	0	2	—	—	—	—	—
2011–12	Adler Mannheim	DEL	46	3	5	8	87	14	1	3	4	14
2012–13	Adler Mannheim	DEL	42	2	7	9	68	3	0	1	1	2
2013–14	Färjestad BK	SHL	39	3	3	6	62	14	0	1	1	18
2014–15	Düsseldorfer EG	DEL	28	0	3	3	22	12	2	4	6	8
AHL totals			362	19	65	84	459	43	3	9	12	50
NHL totals			20	0	1	1	2	—	—	—	—	—

Medal record

Representing Canada

Ice hockey

World Junior Championships
Gold medal – first place	2005 Minnesota	
Silver medal – second place	2004 Helsinki	

IIHF U18 Championships
Gold medal – first place	2003 Yaroslavl	

=== International ===
Year	Team	Event	Result	GP	G	A	Pts	PIM
2002	Canada Pacific	U17	2nd place, silver medalist(s)	6	0	2	2	6
2002	Canada	U18	1st place, gold medalist(s)	5	2	2	4	6
2003	Canada	WJC18	1st place, gold medalist(s)	7	1	1	2	0
2004	Canada	WJC	2nd place, silver medalist(s)	6	0	1	1	0
2005	Canada	WJC	1st place, gold medalist(s)	6	1	0	1	6
Junior totals				30	4	6	10	18

== Transactions ==
- June 21, 2003 - Drafted by the St. Louis Blues in the 1st round, 30th overall.
- June 25, 2004 - Traded to the Dallas Stars for Jason Bacashihua.
- March 9, 2006 - Traded by the Stars to the Minnesota Wild with Martin Skoula for Willie Mitchell and a 2nd round pick in 2007.
- July 11, 2008 - Traded by the Wild to the Montreal Canadiens for Corey Locke.
- July 13, 2010 - Signed a one-year deal with the Edmonton Oilers.
- February 28, 2011 - Traded by the Oilers to Colorado Avalanche for Kevin Montgomery.

== See also ==
- List of black NHL players

Awards and achievements
Preceded by Jeff Taffe	St. Louis Blues first-round draft pick 2003	Succeeded by Marek Schwarz
