= Corey Locke =

Canadian professional ice hockey player

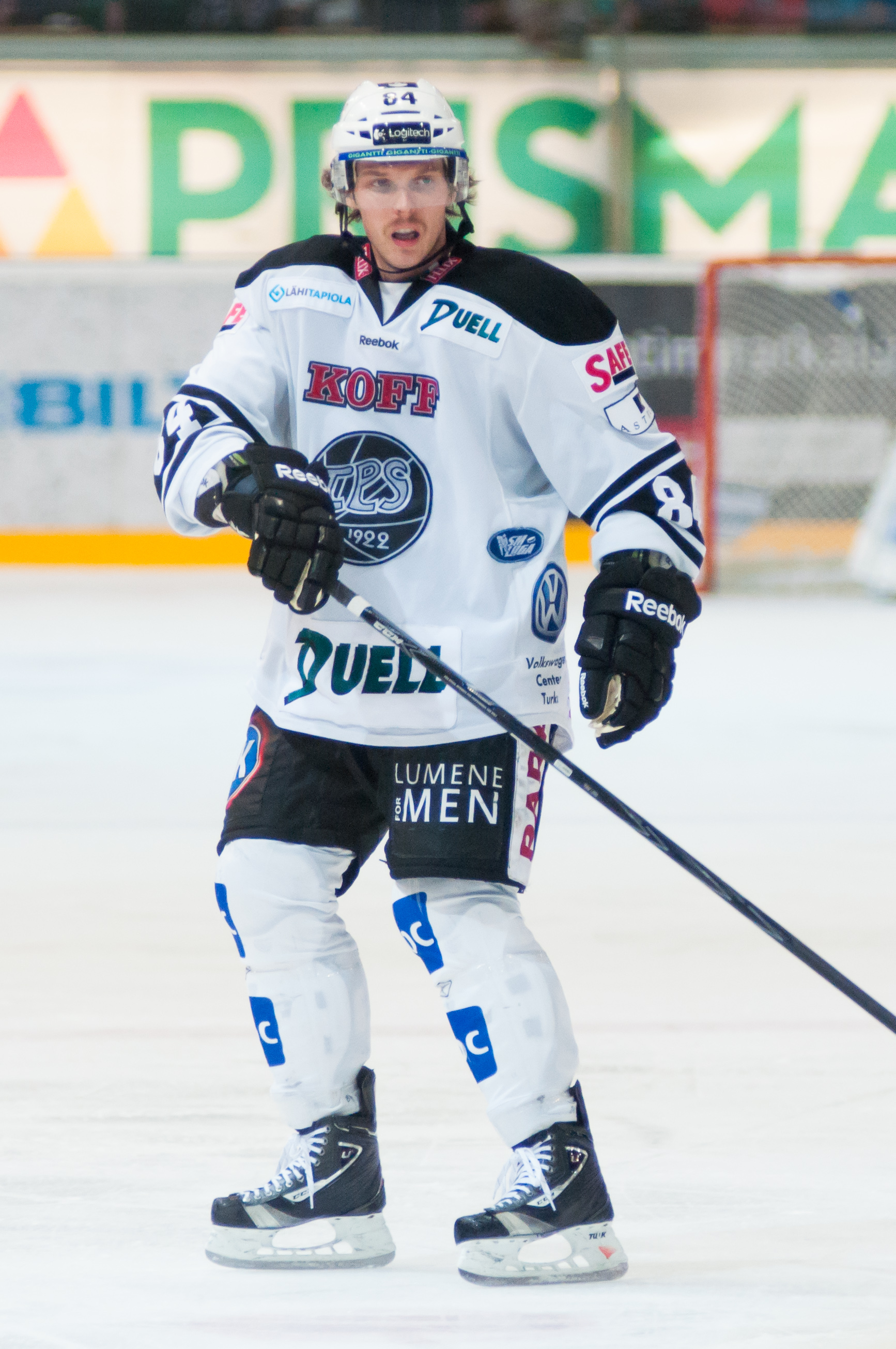
- Locke with Turun Palloseura in 2012
- Born: May 8, 1984 (age 42) Newmarket, Ontario, Canada
- Height: 5 ft 9 in (175 cm)
- Weight: 168 lb (76 kg; 12 st 0 lb)
- Position: Centre Left wing
- Shot: Left
- Played for: Montreal Canadiens; New York Rangers; Ottawa Senators; Turku TPS; Eisbären Berlin; Nürnberg Ice Tigers; EHC Visp; EC VSV; EHC Black Wings Linz; HC Dynamo Pardubice
- NHL draft: 113th overall, 2003; Montreal Canadiens
- Playing career: 2004–2019

Corey Michael Locke (born May 8, 1984) is a Canadian former professional ice hockey player. He was selected in the fourth round, 113th overall, by the Montreal Canadiens in the 2003 NHL entry draft. Locke also played for the New York Rangers and Ottawa Senators.

== Playing career ==
Locke played one season of junior A hockey with the Newmarket Hurricanes and was signed by the Ottawa 67's of the Ontario Hockey League (OHL). Locke played three seasons in the OHL, winning the Red Tilson Trophy as the league's most outstanding player two years in a row. In 2003, his 151 points were the most in the CHL. During the 2002–2003 season, Locke and Matt Foy formed the most dangerous and dominant tandem in Ontario major junior hockey. Following this season, Locke was drafted 113th overall in the 2003 NHL entry draft by the Montreal Canadiens. He was returned to junior for the 2003–04 season.

On September 15, 2004, Locke signed a three-year entry-level contract with the Canadiens. He was then assigned to their AHL affiliate, the Hamilton Bulldogs for further development, and won the Calder Cup with the Bulldogs in the 2006–07 AHL season. After averaging almost a point per game in Hamilton, Locke made his NHL debut (and only NHL appearance of the season) in Montreal on January 8, 2008.

In July 2008, Locke was traded by the Canadiens to the Minnesota Wild for Shawn Belle. Unable to make the Wild's opening night roster for the 2008–09 season, he was reassigned to the Houston Aeros, leading the team to the West Conference finals with 23 points in the final.

In 2009, Locke signed a one-year deal with the New York Rangers. He was then reassigned to AHL affiliate, the Hartford Wolf Pack to begin the 2009–10 season. On March 28, 2010, Locke was recalled to the NHL and made his Rangers debut in a 4-3 victory over the New York Islanders on March 30, 2010. After 3 games with the Blueshirts, Locke was returned to the AHL and finished the season with 85 points in 76 games to be named to the AHL Second All-Star Team.

In 2010, Locke signed a two-year contract with the Ottawa Senators. He recorded his first NHL point against the New York Islanders on January 13, 2011, when he assisted on a goal by Ottawa's Nick Foligno. Locke played the two seasons mainly with the Binghamton Senators. In 2011, he won the AHL MVP award, and the Senators won the AHL championship. Locke was injured for most of the 2011-12 season, and Binghamton failed to make the playoffs. At the end of the season, Locke was added to the Ottawa Senators roster, but did not play.

In 2012, Locke left the Senators to sign with TPS of the Finnish SM-liiga. After scoring only five goals, and with TPS not in championship contention, Locke was moved in January 2013 to Berlin to join the Polar Bears of the Deutsche Eishockey Liga, where he joined his former OHL teammate Matt Foy.

A free agent at the conclusion of the season in Germany, Locke returned to the American Hockey League, signing a one-year contract with the Chicago Wolves on July 31, 2013.

In October 2014, Locke inked a deal with the Nürnberg Ice Tigers of the German Deutsche Eishockey Liga for the remainder of the 2014-15 season.

On November 5, 2015, he was signed to a one-month contract by EHC Visp of the Swiss NLB. Scoring a better than point-per-game average, Locke was secured for the remainder of the season with Visp.

On July 13, 2015, Locke continued his European career, agreeing to a one-year deal with Austrian outfit, EC VSV of the EBEL.

== Personal ==
Locke was born in Newmarket, Ontario, north of Toronto, and maintains a residence there. He has a younger brother named Kyle.

== Career statistics ==
			Regular season					Playoffs
Season	Team	League	GP	G	A	Pts	PIM	GP	G	A	Pts	PIM
2000–01	Newmarket Hurricanes	OPJHL	49	33	50	83	18	16	10	12	22	14
2001–02	Ottawa 67's	OHL	55	18	25	43	18	13	6	7	13	10
2002–03	Ottawa 67's	OHL	66	63	88	151	83	23	19	19	38	30
2003–04	Ottawa 67's	OHL	65	51	67	118	82	7	7	3	10	10
2004–05	Hamilton Bulldogs	AHL	78	16	27	43	20	4	0	0	0	2
2005–06	Hamilton Bulldogs	AHL	77	19	40	59	67	—	—	—	—	—
2006–07	Hamilton Bulldogs	AHL	80	20	35	55	54	22	10	12	22	10
2007–08	Montreal Canadiens	NHL	1	0	0	0	0	—	—	—	—	—
2007–08	Hamilton Bulldogs	AHL	78	30	42	72	50	—	—	—	—	—
2008–09	Houston Aeros	AHL	77	25	54	79	60	20	12	11	23	32
2009–10	New York Rangers	NHL	3	0	0	0	0	—	—	—	—	—
2009–10	Hartford Wolf Pack	AHL	76	31	54	85	44	—	—	—	—	—
2010–11	Ottawa Senators	NHL	5	0	1	1	0	—	—	—	—	—
2010–11	Binghamton Senators	AHL	69	21	65	86	42	16	3	12	15	12
2011–12	Binghamton Senators	AHL	38	10	31	41	22	—	—	—	—	—
2012–13	TPS	SM-l	37	5	12	17	22	—	—	—	—	—
2012–13	Eisbären Berlin	DEL	16	1	6	7	10	13	2	6	8	4
2013–14	Chicago Wolves	AHL	36	6	19	25	16	—	—	—	—	—
2013–14	Abbotsford Heat	AHL	30	4	19	23	8	4	1	0	1	0
2014–15	Nürnberg Ice Tigers	DEL	44	9	21	30	20	8	2	7	9	6
2015–16	EHC Visp	CHE.2	29	17	36	53	22	7	1	7	8	8
2016–17	EC VSV	AUT	52	12	64	76	24	—	—	—	—	—
2017–18	EHC Black Wings Linz	AUT	54	23	47	70	34	12	1	9	10	8
2018–19	EHC Black Wings Linz	AUT	52	12	33	45	28	6	0	8	8	8
AHL totals			639	182	386	568	383	66	26	35	61	56
NHL totals			9	0	1	1	0	—	—	—	—	—
AUT totals			158	47	144	191	86	18	1	17	18	16

== Awards and achievements ==
CHL

- First Team All-Star - 2004
- CHL Player of the Year - 2003
- CHL Top Scorer Award - 2003
- First Team All-Star - 2003

OHL

- Red Tilson Trophy - 2004
- Eddie Powers Memorial Trophy - 2004
- First Team All-Star - 2004
- Red Tilson Trophy - 2003
- Eddie Powers Memorial Trophy - 2003
- First Team All-Star - 2003

AHL

- Calder Cup Champion - 2007, 2011
- Second Team All-Star - 2010
- Hamilton Bulldogs career points leader (229)
- Hamilton Bulldogs career goals leader (85)
- Hamilton Bulldogs career assists leader (144)
- First All-Star Team - 2011
- Les Cunningham Award - MVP 2011

== Transactions ==
- July 11, 2008 - Montreal Canadiens (NHL) traded Corey Locke to Minnesota Wild (NHL) for Shawn Belle.
- July 3, 2009 - Signed as unrestricted free agent by the New York Rangers
- July 7, 2010 - Signed as unrestricted free agent by the Ottawa Senators

Awards and achievements
Preceded by Pierre-Marc Bouchard	CHL Player of the Year; 2003	Succeeded by Sidney Crosby
