= Brendan Bell (ice hockey) =

Canadian ice hockey player (born 1983)

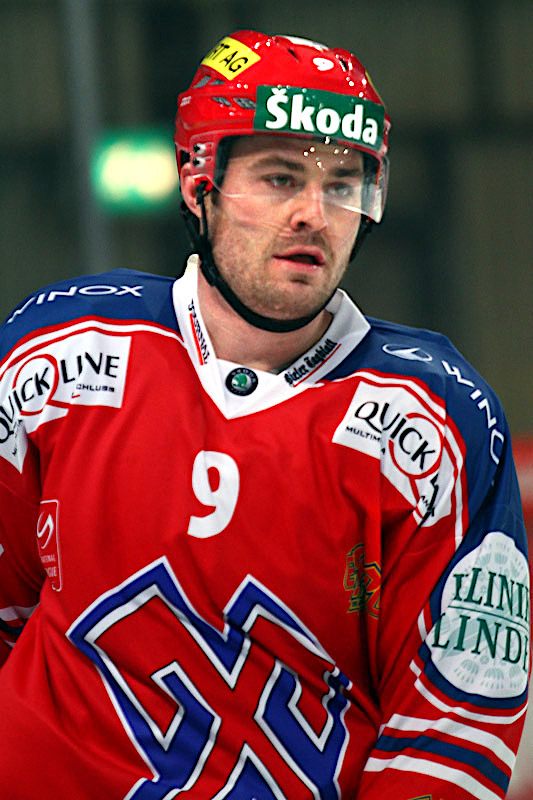
- Bell during his time with EHC Biel of the NLA
- Born: March 31, 1983 (age 43) Ottawa, Ontario, Canada
- Height: 6 ft 2 in (188 cm)
- Weight: 211 lb (96 kg; 15 st 1 lb)
- Position: Defence
- Shot: Left
- Played for: Toronto Maple Leafs; Phoenix Coyotes; Ottawa Senators; Avangard Omsk; EHC Biel; New York Rangers; Frölunda HC; HC Bolzano
- NHL draft: 65th overall, 2001; Toronto Maple Leafs
- Playing career: 2003–2016

Brendan Bell (born March 31, 1983) is a Canadian former professional ice hockey defenceman. Bell was selected by the Toronto Maple Leafs in the third round (65th overall) of the 2001 NHL entry draft. Bell went on to play with the Phoenix Coyotes, Ottawa Senators and New York Rangers in the NHL, followed by several stints with European teams. He is a businessman and part-time broadcaster in the Ottawa area.

== Playing career ==
=== Junior ===
Bell attended St. Pius X High School in Ottawa. Bell played in the CJHL for the Ottawa Jr. Senators. Bell then moved on to the Ontario Hockey League (OHL) with the Ottawa 67's where in four OHL seasons, he scored 32 goals and 171 points in 238 total games. In 2002–03, his final season with the 67's, he was named the team's captain. Bell was named the top defenseman in both the OHL and Canadian Hockey League that season. He also played on the silver-medal winning Canadian team in the 2003 World Junior Ice Hockey Championships, while registering one goal and two points in the tournament.

=== Professional ===
Bell was drafted in the third round, 65th overall, of the 2001 NHL entry draft by the Toronto Maple Leafs. Bell signed with the Maple Leafs in March 2003. He was assigned to the team's American Hockey League affiliate, the St. John's Maple Leafs. In 2003, Bell was selected to play for Team Canada at the Spengler Cup, which Team Canada won. He spent three years with the AHL team before Bell made his NHL debut with the Leafs in the 2005–06 season, playing one game.

On February 27, 2007, Bell was traded by the Leafs to the Phoenix Coyotes at the trade deadline along with a second round draft pick in for Yanic Perreault and a fifth round draft pick. He finished the season with the Coyotes, compiling one goal and six assists in 44 games. Phoenix re-signed Bell as a restricted free agent in the offseason to a one-year deal. Bell spent most of the following season with the Coyotes AHL affiliate, the San Antonio Rampage, playing in 69 games, scoring 7 goals and 31 points. He played two games in the NHL during the 2007–08 season, amassing no points.

On July 11, 2008, Bell signed as a free agent with the Ottawa Senators to a one-year contract. During the 2008–09 season he played in a career-high 53 games with the Senators, contributing 21 points. An unrestricted free agent following the season, on July 31, 2009, Bell signed with the St. Louis Blues on a one-year contract. After starting the 2009–10 season playing 22 games with AHL affiliate, the Peoria Rivermen, he was traded by St. Louis, along with Tomas Kana, to the Columbus Blue Jackets for Pascal Pelletier on December 8, 2009. Bell was immediately assigned to Columbus' AHL affiliate, the Syracuse Crunch.

On May 19, 2010, Bell signed a one-year contract with the Russian team Avangard Omsk of the Kontinental Hockey League. After a single game with Omsk, despite recording two assists, Bell signed with the Swiss National League team EHC Biel. He played for the rest of the season with EHC Biel, recording two goals and 11 points in 29 games. Bell was a part of Team Canada for the second time at the 2010 Spengler Cup. Team Canada finished second in the tournament, losing to HC Davos in the final.

On August 3, 2011, Bell signed a contract with the New York Rangers. He appeared in a single game with the Rangers during the 2011–12 season, but primarily spent his time with the Connecticut Whale of the AHL.

For the 2012–13 season, Bell signed a one-year contract to play for the Frölunda Indians in the Swedish Hockey League. After an unproductive campaign with the Indians, he returned to EHC Biel for the 2013–14 season. In 2013, Bell was selected to play for Team Canada for the third time at the Spengler Cup. Team Canada was eliminated in the semi-finals by HC Geneve-Servette.

Prior to the 2014–15 season, Bell returned to North America and accepted a try-out invitation to attend the Anaheim Ducks training camp. He was reassigned to the Ducks AHL affiliate, the Norfolk Admirals to begin the year. Bell produced 23 points in 47 games from the blueline with the Admirals before he was traded for future considerations to the Chicago Wolves on March 3, 2015. In 2016, Bell signed with HC Bolzano of the Austrian Hockey League. Bell retired after a short stint with Bolzano.

== Post retirement career ==
Following his retirement, Bell became a financial planner and owns a gym in Manotick, Ontario. He also became a broadcaster, joining Ottawa Senators game-day broadcasts on local radio station TSN 1200.

Bell is a father of three.

== Career statistics ==
=== Regular season and playoffs ===
			Regular season					Playoffs
Season	Team	League	GP	G	A	Pts	PIM	GP	G	A	Pts	PIM
1998–99	Ottawa Jr. Senators	CJHL	54	7	20	27	46	—	—	—	—	—
1999–00	Ottawa 67's	OHL	48	1	32	33	34	5	0	1	1	4
2000–01	Ottawa 67's	OHL	68	7	32	39	59	20	1	11	12	22
2001–02	Ottawa 67's	OHL	67	10	36	46	56	13	2	5	7	25
2002–03	Ottawa 67's	OHL	55	14	39	53	46	23	8	19	27	25
2003–04	St. John's Maple Leafs	AHL	74	7	18	25	72	—	—	—	—	—
2004–05	St. John's Maple Leafs	AHL	75	6	25	31	57	5	0	1	1	2
2005–06	Toronto Marlies	AHL	70	6	37	43	99	5	0	4	4	10
2005–06	Toronto Maple Leafs	NHL	1	0	0	0	0	—	—	—	—	—
2006–07	Toronto Maple Leafs	NHL	31	1	4	5	19	—	—	—	—	—
2006–07	Phoenix Coyotes	NHL	14	0	2	2	8	—	—	—	—	—
2007–08	Phoenix Coyotes	NHL	2	0	0	0	0	—	—	—	—	—
2007–08	San Antonio Rampage	AHL	69	7	24	31	80	7	2	5	7	10
2008–09	Binghamton Senators	AHL	15	6	9	15	12	—	—	—	—	—
2008–09	Ottawa Senators	NHL	53	6	15	21	24	—	—	—	—	—
2009–10	Peoria Rivermen	AHL	22	4	13	17	26	—	—	—	—	—
2009–10	Syracuse Crunch	AHL	49	10	25	35	30	—	—	—	—	—
2010–11	Avangard Omsk	KHL	1	0	2	2	0	—	—	—	—	—
2010–11	EHC Biel	NLA	29	2	9	11	14	—	—	—	—	—
2011–12	Connecticut Whale	AHL	65	7	26	33	68	5	0	1	1	4
2011–12	New York Rangers	NHL	1	0	0	0	0	—	—	—	—	—
2012–13	Frölunda HC	SEL	21	1	9	10	8	6	1	0	1	6
2013–14	EHC Biel	NLA	42	4	13	17	26	—	—	—	—	—
2014–15	Norfolk Admirals	AHL	47	1	22	23	20	—	—	—	—	—
2014–15	Chicago Wolves	AHL	17	1	9	10	6	5	0	2	2	2
2015–16	HC Bolzano	AUT	12	3	5	8	8	1	0	0	0	0
AHL totals			503	55	209	264	470	27	2	13	15	28
NHL totals			102	7	21	28	51	—	—	—	—	—

Medal record

Representing Canada

World Junior Championships
Silver medal – second place	2003 Halifax	Ice hockey

=== International ===
Year	Team	Event	Result	GP	G	A	Pts	PIM
2003	Canada	WJC	2nd place, silver medalist(s)	6	1	1	2	6
Junior totals				6	1	1	2	6

== Awards ==
- 1998–99 CJHL All-Rookie Team
- 1998–99 CJHL Rookie of the Year Award
- 2002–03 OHL First All-Star Team
- 2002–03 OHL Max Kaminsky Trophy
- 2002–03 CHL First All-Star Team
- 2002–03 CHL Dewalt Top Defenceman Award
