= Matt Foy =

Canadian ice hockey player (born 1983)

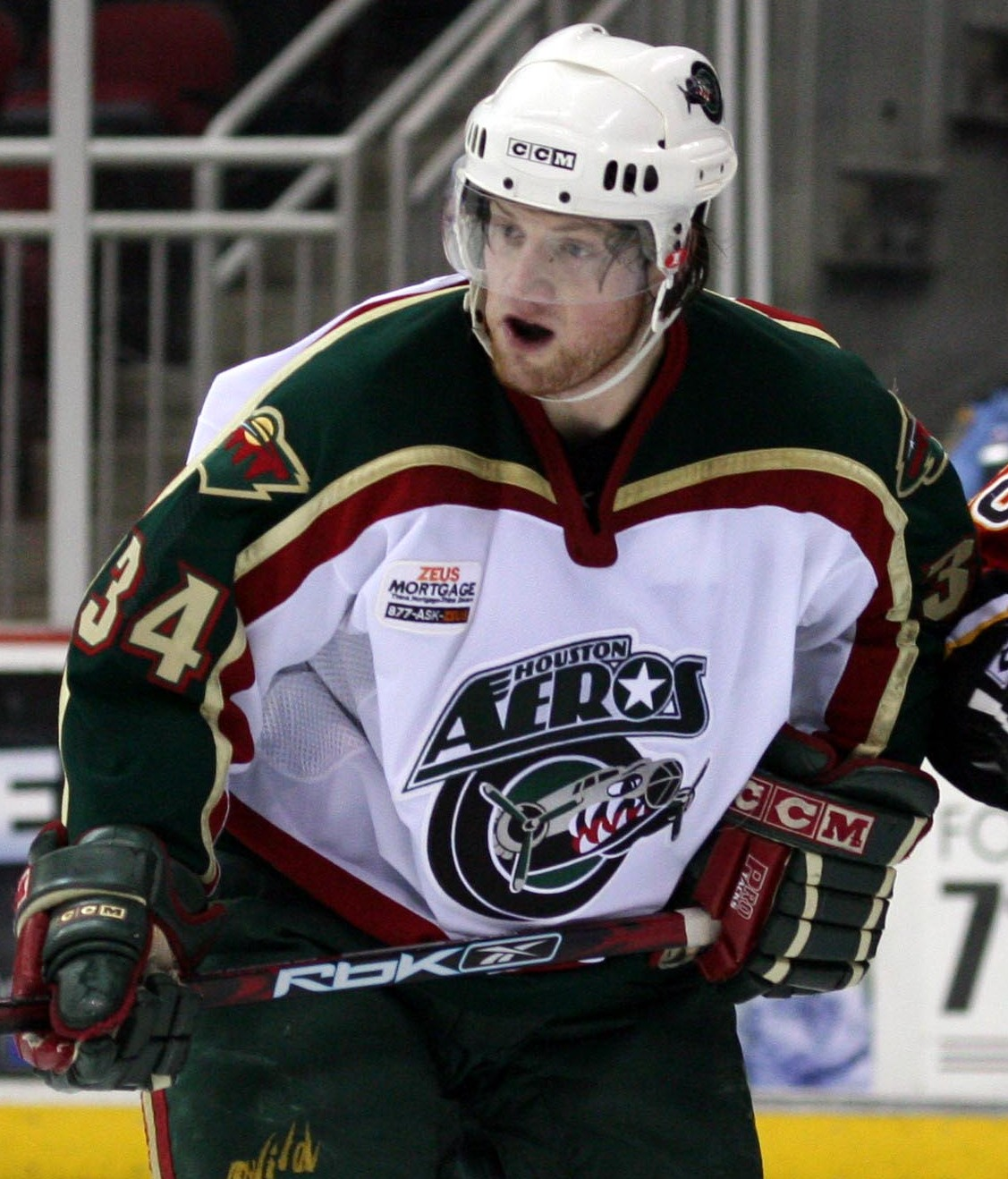
- Foy with the Houston Aeros in 2007
- Born: May 18, 1983 (age 43) Oakville, Ontario, Canada
- Height: 6 ft 2 in (188 cm)
- Weight: 228 lb (103 kg; 16 st 4 lb)
- Position: Right wing
- Shot: Right
- ACH team Former teams: Dundas Real McCoys; Minnesota Wild; Eisbären Berlin
- NHL draft: 175th overall, 2002; Minnesota Wild
- Playing career: 2005–2016

Matthew Foy (born May 18, 1983) is a Canadian professional ice hockey player who is currently playing for the Dundas Real McCoys in the Allen Cup.

== Playing career ==
Born in Oakville, Ontario, Foy was drafted by the Minnesota Wild 175th overall in the 2002 NHL entry draft. He began his hockey career with Merrimack College in the NCAA. From there he moved on to the Ottawa 67's of the OHL. In the 2002–03 season with the 67's Foy formed one of the most dominating tandems in the history of the OHL with teammate Corey Locke. He spent the majority of the 2005–06 and 2006–07 seasons with the Houston Aeros, Minnesota's top farm team in the American Hockey League (AHL). In the 2007–08 season, he was with the Wild all season and played 28 games, scoring four goals with four assists and 28 penalty minutes.

On July 14, 2008, Foy was signed as a free agent by the St. Louis Blues to a one-year contract. He was subsequently assigned to the Blues AHL affiliate, the Peoria Rivermen to begin the 2008–09 season. On March 11, 2009, after receiving a six-game suspension for leaving the bench to fight the Aeros' John Scott, Foy left the Rivermen, with the team citing "personal reasons". He only played 4 games during the season after being stricken by a sports hernia in training camp.

On September 28, 2009, Foy signed a one-year contract with the Arizona Sundogs of the Central Hockey League. Foy was injured on the opening night of the 2009–10 season and was later granted leave by the CHL in mid November. He returning to finish in 7 games with the Sundogs for 3 assists before succumbing to season-ending injury on February 13, 2010.

Foy came back after sitting out the 2010–11 season and signed with the Stockton Thunder of the ECHL, enjoying his highest offensive output since the 2006-07 season when he led Houston with 27 goals and 50 points.

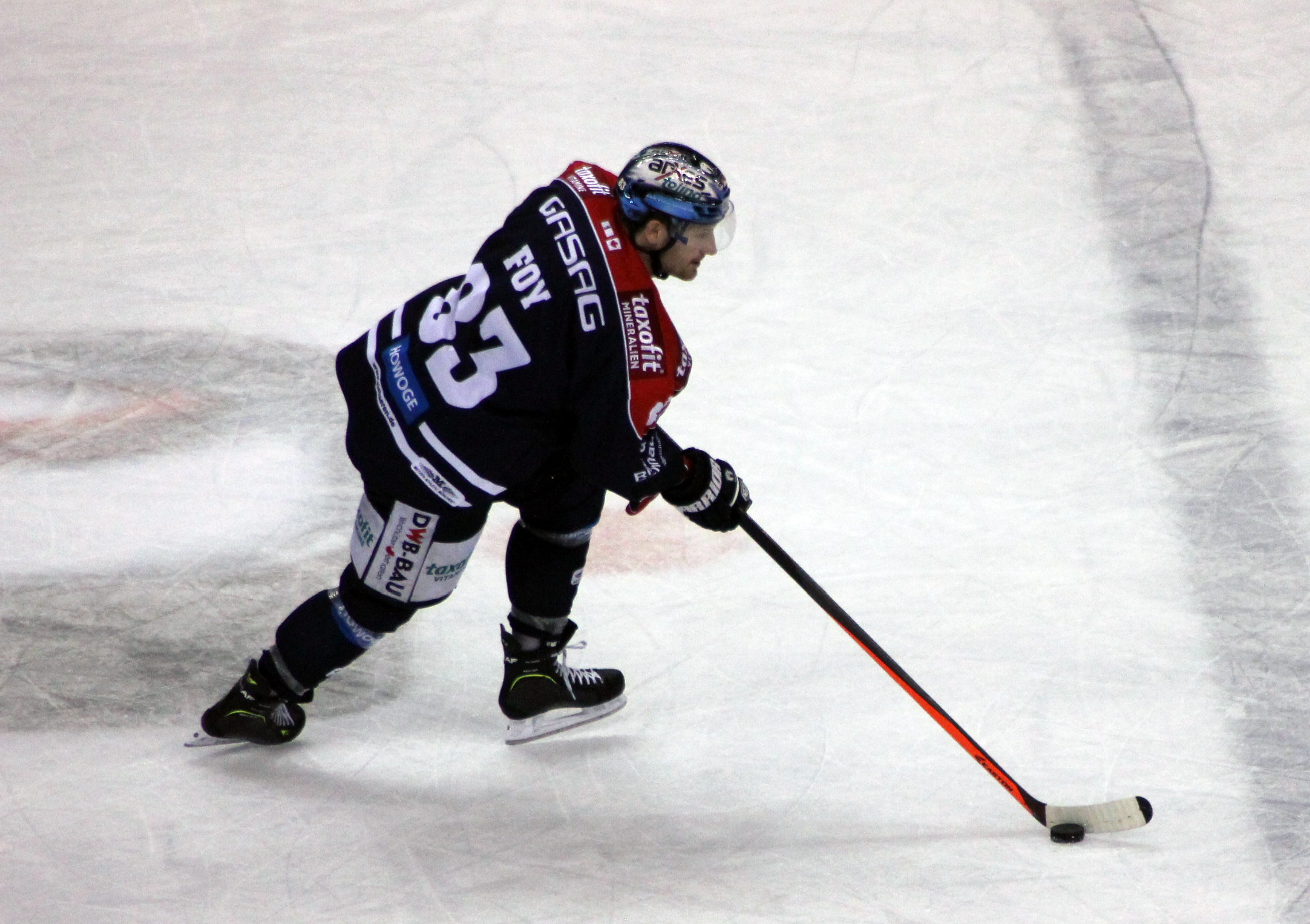
Foy with Eisbären Berlin in 2015

On July 4, 2012 it was announced that Foy has signed a one-year contract with six time German champion Eisbären Berlin. In the next 3 years, he played for Berlin and scored 75 points and 33 goals in 130 games.

For the 2015–16 season, he left the DEL with Berlin and signed a contract with the Eispiraten Crimmitschau from the DEL2, where he appeared in 31 games and accumulated 34 points and 52 penalty minutes. After that season, he returned to Ontario.

== Career statistics ==
			Regular season					Playoffs
Season	Team	League	GP	G	A	Pts	PIM	GP	G	A	Pts	PIM
1999–2000	Mississauga Senators U18 AAA	GTHL
2000–01	Wexford Raiders	OPJHL	47	43	49	92	30	—	—	—	—	—
2001–02	Merrimack College	HE	31	7	17	24	48	—	—	—	—	—
2002–03	Ottawa 67's	OHL	68	61	71	132	112	21	11	20	31	47
2003–04	Houston Aeros	AHL	51	11	13	24	74	1	0	0	0	0
2004–05	Houston Aeros	AHL	69	12	13	25	78	5	1	2	3	6
2005–06	Minnesota Wild	NHL	19	2	3	5	16	—	—	—	—	—
2005–06	Houston Aeros	AHL	51	15	25	40	122	8	5	3	8	29
2006–07	Minnesota Wild	NHL	9	0	0	0	4	—	—	—	—	—
2006–07	Houston Aeros	AHL	62	27	23	50	121	—	—	—	—	—
2007–08	Minnesota Wild	NHL	28	4	4	8	28	1	0	0	0	0
2008–09	Peoria Rivermen	AHL	4	0	2	2	33	—	—	—	—	—
2009–10	Arizona Sundogs	CHL	7	0	3	3	26	—	—	—	—	—
2011–12	Stockton Thunder	ECHL	67	16	36	52	71	6	1	3	4	6
2012–13	Eisbären Berlin	DEL	40	11	14	25	42	7	0	2	2	6
2013–14	Eisbären Berlin	DEL	31	5	12	17	40	—	—	—	—	—
2014–15	Eisbären Berlin	DEL	28	11	8	19	16	3	0	1	1	27
2015–16	Eispiraten Crimmitschau	DEL2	31	12	22	34	52	—	—	—	—	—
2016–17	Dundas Real McCoys	ACH	20	8	14	22	52	5	3	4	7	4
2017–18	Dundas Real McCoys	ACH	17	10	21	31	18	3	1	2	3	12
2018–19	Dundas Real McCoys	ACH	6	1	4	5	14	—	—	—	—	—
AHL totals			237	65	76	141	428	14	6	5	11	35
NHL totals			56	6	7	13	48	1	0	0	0	0
DEL totals			99	27	34	61	98	10	0	3	3	33

== Awards ==
- 2002–03 OHL First Team All-Star
- 2002–03 OHL Jim Mahon Memorial Trophy
- 2002–03 CHL Second Team All-Star
- 2012–13 DEL Champion with the Eisbären Berlin
