= Ottawa 67's =

Ontario Hockey League team in Ottawa

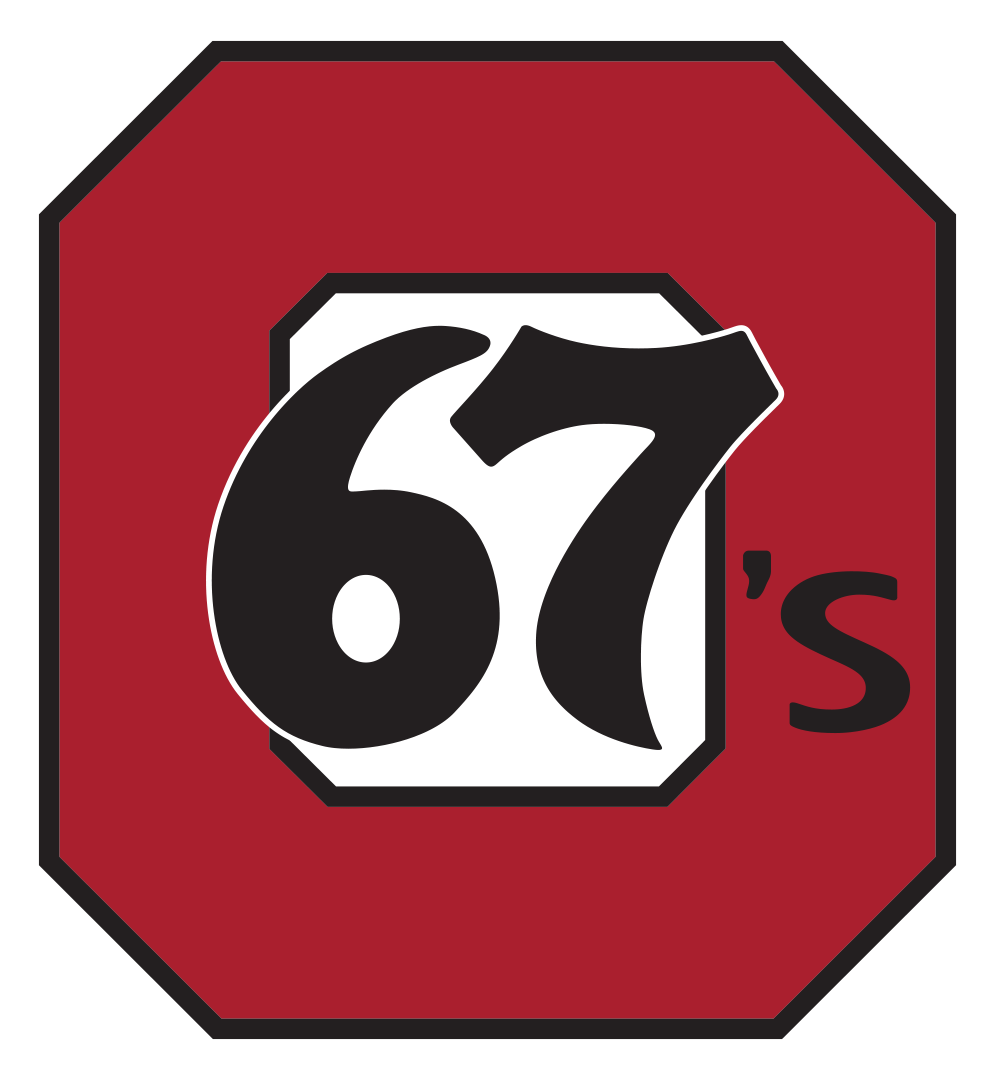
- City: Ottawa, Ontario
- League: Ontario Hockey League
- Conference: Eastern
- Division: East
- Founded: 1967
- Home arena: TD Place Arena (1967–2012, 2014–present); Canadian Tire Centre (2012–2014)
- Colours: Red, white and black
- Owner: Ottawa Sports and Entertainment Group
- General manager: Jan Egert
- Head coach: Dave Cameron
- Website: www.ottawa67s.com

Championships
- Playoff championships: Memorial Cups: 2 (1984, 1999); OHL championships: (1977, 1984, 2001)

Current uniform

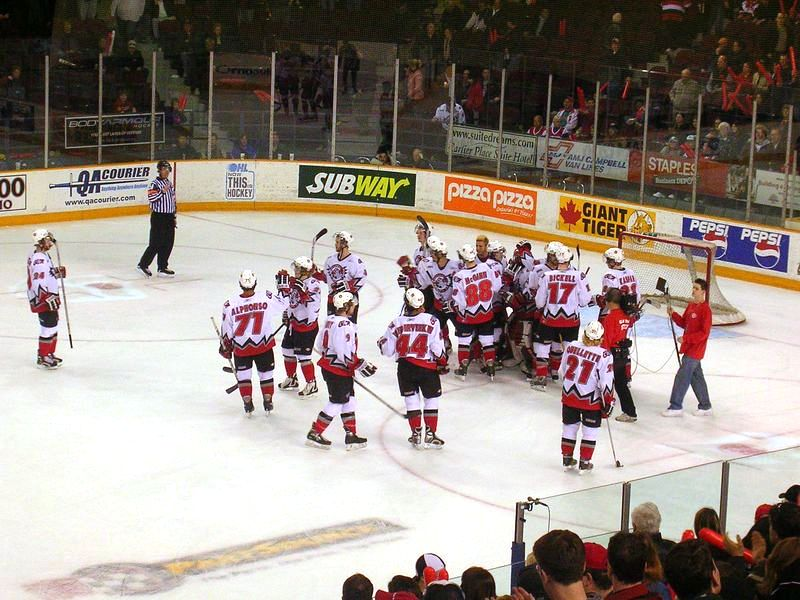
The Ottawa 67's celebrate a playoff victory

The Ottawa 67's are a major junior ice hockey team based in Ottawa, Ontario, Canada, that plays in the Ontario Hockey League (OHL). Established during Canada's centennial year of 1967 and named in honour of this, the 67's currently play their home games at TD Place Arena. The 67's are three-time OHL champions, and have played in the Memorial Cup five times, winning in 1984 and as host team in 1999.

== History ==
The Ontario Hockey Association granted the city of Ottawa an expansion franchise on February 16, 1967. Four months later, the team was given the nickname 67's, in honour of Canada's centennial year. Three local businessmen—Bill Cowley, Howard Darwin and Bill Touhey as well as Alderman Howard Henry—helped bring junior hockey back to Canada's capital. The 67's filled the hockey void left by the departure of the junior Hull–Ottawa Canadiens and the semi-professional Hull-Ottawa Canadiens. However, before the team played a game Touhey left the ownership group and Jack Kinsella became one of the owners in his stead.

Bill Long was the team's first head coach. The 67's played their first game on October 6, 1967, losing 9–0 on the road to the Niagara Falls Flyers. The first 11 home games of the season were played in the Hull Arena, Hull, Quebec, as their new home arena was still under construction. They played their first game at their own arena, the Ottawa Civic Centre, on December 29, losing to the Montreal Junior Canadiens 4–2. The first season for the 67's was terrible at best, with the team posting a final record of six wins, 45 losses and three ties. They made the playoffs in their second season, but lost in the quarter-finals to the Niagara Falls Flyers. They won their first playoff series over the Hamilton Red Wings in 1970–71, led by future Hockey Hall of Famer Denis Potvin on defence. The 67's reached the OHA finals during the following season in 1971–72. They lost to the Peterborough Petes 3–0, with two ties. The 67's came close to playing at home in the Memorial Cup, as the Ottawa Civic Centre hosted the tournament that year.

=== Brian Kilrea joins the 67's ===
Darwin announced in May 1972 that he would resign as team president in June 1972 and this was quickly followed by Bill Long's departure as general manager and head coach in June as well. Howard Henry was announced as the team's new president. Leo Boivin was named as Long's successor as head coach of the 67's and Ross Tyrell as general manager on June 18. After a rebuilding season in 1973–74, after which both Boivin and Tyrell were let go by the team after a surprise loss to the Peterborough Petes in the playoffs the 67's hired a young up-and-coming coach named Brian Kilrea as both coach and general manager. Kilrea coached the team to three successive improved winning records, culminating in a victory in the J. Ross Robertson Cup finals in 1977, versus the London Knights, who were coached by former 67's bench boss Bill Long. During the late 1970s, Ottawa was led by scoring champions Peter Lee, Bobby Smith and Jim Fox and future Hockey Hall of Fame defenceman Doug Wilson.

The 67's moved on to compete for the 1977 Memorial Cup versus the champions of the other Canadian major junior leagues, the New Westminster Bruins of the Western Canada Hockey League, and the Sherbrooke Castors of the Quebec Major Junior Hockey League (QMJHL). The 1977 Memorial Cup tournament was the first to be held in British Columbia and the first to use a double round-robin format. Ottawa lost the first game 7–6 to the Bruins, then won three in a row, 6–1 over the Castors, 4–3 in overtime versus the Bruins, and then 5–2 against Sherbrooke. However, Ottawa lost to the host Bruins 6–5 in the championship game. Bobby Smith and goaltender Pat Riggin were named to the tournament's all-star team.

Ottawa finished first in their division the following season, and were tipped to go all the way to the Memorial Cup tournament again, but struggled to finish off the Wayne Gretzky-led Soo Greyhounds in the first round and lost to the rival Peterborough Petes in the semi-finals. The 67's rebuilt during the 1978–79 season, and returned to play for a second J. Ross Robertson Cup versus the Kitchener Rangers at the end of the 1981–82 season. They were swept by the Rangers, but that season marked the first of three consecutive division titles from 1982 to 1984.

=== First Memorial Cup victory ===
In 1984, the 67's reached the OHL championship series in a rematch from the 1982 OHL finals, against the Kitchener Rangers. As the team with the most points in the league, Kitchener had been chosen to host the 1984 Memorial Cup tournament. In the OHL itself, however, Ottawa had unfinished business, having lost to Kitchener two years earlier. The 67's, who finished second overall to Kitchener in the OHL, defeated the Rangers and won their second J. Ross Robertson Cup and earned a place in the Memorial Cup tournament.

At the Memorial Cup in Kitchener, Ottawa faced the Laval Voisins, featuring Mario Lemieux, of the QMJHL and the Kamloops Jr. Oilers of the now renamed Western Hockey League (WHL). The 67's were led by Gary Roberts, Brad Shaw, and Bruce Cassidy. The 67's won against Laval and Kamloops before losing to Kitchener in the round-robin series. In the semi-final game, Ottawa beat Kamloops again and in the finals versus Kitchener, Ottawa scored a victory, winning their first Memorial Cup. Adam Creighton was named the tournament's most valuable player and goaltender Darren Pang was named the tournament's top goalie. Creighton, Pang, Shaw, Cassidy, Jim Camazzola and Don McLaren of the 67's were all named to the tournament's all-star team. After the season ended, Kilrea left Ottawa to become an assistant coach in the National Hockey League (NHL) with the New York Islanders.

=== Kilrea returns from the NHL ===
Cliff Stewart was hired to replace Kilrea in August 1984 as the 67's graduated many of their star players following their cup win. Stewart lasted until November, replacing him with Bob Ellett. The rebuilding team suffered through two dismal seasons after winning the cup, finishing third-last in the OHL in 1985 and second-last in 1986. Ellett resigned at the end of the season and Brian Kilrea, out of contract with the Islanders, returned for the 1986–87 season. The second Kilrea era was not as superb as his first coaching stint. The 67's finished as high as second place in their division two times, and reached the league's playoff semi-finals three times. The highlight of this era was Andrew Cassels, the rookie of the year in 1986–87, and scoring champion in 1987–88. Kilrea went into coaching retirement after the 1993–94 season, remaining as the general manager. For the 1994–95 season, the 67's were coached by former scoring champion Peter Lee.

=== The third Kilrea era ===
Brian Kilrea came out of coaching retirement in 1995 and replaced Lee. On June 10, 1998, Jeff Hunt purchased the team from Howard Darwin and Earl Montagano. Kilrea was asked by Hunt to remain as coach for three more years, but would remain as coach until the end of the 2008–09 season, retaining his duties as general manager until 2011. He was replaced by Chris Byrne, first as coach, then as general manager. The Kilrea-coached 67's resurged to the top of the OHL, winning five consecutive east division titles from 1996 to 2000. In 1996–97, Ottawa finished with the most points in the league with 104, however, lost in the finals 4–2 to their division rivals, the Oshawa Generals. The 67's reached the finals again in 1998, losing to the Guelph Storm in five games.

=== Memorial Cup hosts, 1999 ===
In 1999, 67's owner Jeff Hunt led the team's bid to host the 1999 Memorial Cup tournament. Despite the fact that in 1997 the tournament had been hosted across the river in Hull, he was able to convince the Canadian Hockey League (CHL) to host the event in Ottawa and guarantee his team a berth in the tournament. The 67's did not disappoint, as every game of the series was sold out. In the 1998–99 season, the 67's lost to the eventual OHL champion Belleville Bulls in the second round of the playoffs. As hosts, they still took part in the Memorial Cup tournament and faced the Bulls, the Calgary Hitmen of the WHL and the Acadie–Bathurst Titan of the QMJHL. The 67's beat the Belleville Bulls in the Memorial Cup semi-finals and went on to defeat the Calgary Hitmen in the final in a thrilling over-time game that saw Matt Zultek score the winning goal. Nick Boynton was named the tournament most valuable player.

=== Memorial Cup, 2001 ===
After winning their fifth division title, the 67's were bounced in the second round of the playoffs by the Belleville Bulls in 2000. However, it was not long before the 67's went to the Memorial Cup again. Ottawa defeated the Plymouth Whalers in the league championship capturing their second J. Ross Robertson Cup. The 2001 Memorial Cup was played in Regina, Saskatchewan. Ottawa had tougher luck in this tournament, winning just one game in the round robin versus the hometown Regina Pats, then ultimately losing to Regina 5–0 in the tie-breaker game. In the 2002–03 season, the 67's reached the OHL finals again, but fell to the eventual Memorial Cup champions Kitchener Rangers in five games. Ottawa, which won the division in 2003–04, suffered a surprise first round defeat in the playoffs to the Brampton Battalion.

=== Memorial Cup, 2005 ===
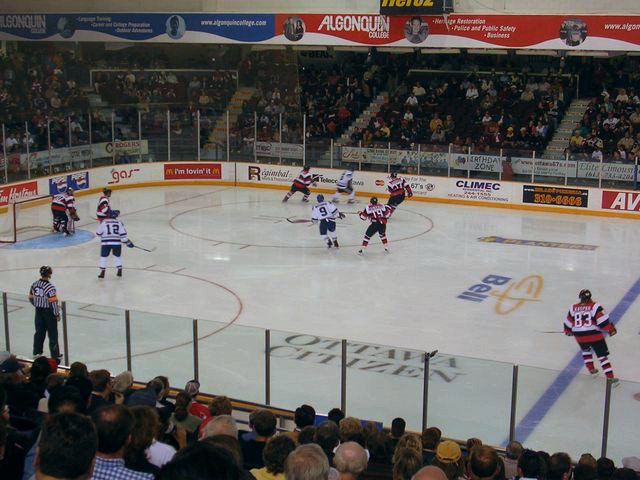
Ottawa playing with its "barberpole" jerseys

The 67's finished in sixth place in the Eastern Conference in 2004–05, but had a veteran-laden team that managed an impressive playoff run. Ottawa upset the Barrie Colts, Sudbury Wolves and Peterborough Petes to reach the finals versus the London Knights. The 67's lost the OHL championship to the Knights, but qualified for the 2005 Memorial Cup by virtue of being the league finalists versus the Knights, who were also hosting the event. In the tournament, Ottawa faced the Knights, the Rimouski Océanic of the QMJHL, featuring Sidney Crosby, and the Kelowna Rockets of the WHL. The 67's won the longest ever game played in the Memorial Cup tournament, when they beat the Rockets in double overtime. Ottawa finished in third place in the round-robin, and then lost to the Océanic in the semi-finals.

== Championships ==
The Ottawa 67's have appeared in the Memorial Cup tournament five times, winning twice. Ottawa has also won the J. Ross Robertson Cup three times, won the Hamilton Spectator Trophy three times, and have won fourteen division titles, the most in the OHL.

Memorial Cup

- 1977 Lost to New Westminster Bruins in finals.
- 1984 Champions vs. Kitchener Rangers.
- 1999 Champions vs. Calgary Hitmen.
- 2001 OHL Representative in Regina, Saskatchewan.
- 2005 OHL Representative in London, Ontario.

J. Ross Robertson Cup

- 1972 Lost to Peterborough Petes.
- 1977 Champions vs. London Knights.
- 1982 Lost to Kitchener Rangers.
- 1984 Champions vs. Kitchener Rangers.
- 1997 Lost to Oshawa Generals.
- 1998 Lost to Guelph Storm.
- 2001 Champions vs. Plymouth Whalers.
- 2003 Lost to Kitchener Rangers.
- 2005 Lost to London Knights.
- 2019 Lost to Guelph Storm.

Bobby Orr Trophy
Eastern Conference champions

- 2001, 2003, 2005, 2019

Hamilton Spectator Trophy
First overall, regular season

- 1977–78 93 points
- 1981–82 96 points
- 1996–97 104 points
- 2018–19 106 points
- 2019–20 101 points
- 2022–23 107 points

Leyden Trophy
East Division champions

- 1976–77 81 points
- 1977–78 93 points
- 1981–82 96 points
- 1982–83 95 points
- 1983–84 102 points
- 1995–96 83 points
- 1996–97 104 points
- 1997–98 89 points
- 1998–99 103 points
- 1999–2000 91 points
- 2002–03 98 points
- 2003–04 71 points
- 2009–10 82 points
- 2010–11 93 points
- 2011–12 88 points
- 2018–19 106 points
- 2019–20 101 points
- 2022–23 107 points

== Coaches ==
Brian Kilrea had a long term coaching relationship with the 67's. Kilrea led the team to three OHL Championships and two Memorial Cups. Kilrea briefly moved up to the NHL as an assistant coach with the New York Islanders from 1984 to 1986, and briefly retired for the 1994–95 season. Kilrea, nicknamed "Killer", has over 1,000 wins coaching junior hockey, all with the 67's. He was named the OHL Coach of the Year five times, and CHL Coach of the Year twice. Kilrea was inducted into the Hockey Hall of Fame in 2003. On September 3, 2008, Kilrea announced that at the end of the 2008–09, he would step down from his head coaching position. He remained with the team as their general manager until the 2011–12 season, after which he was replaced in that post by head coach Chris Byrne.

Andre Tourigny won OHL Coach of the Year award in 2018–19 leading the 67's to a 50–12–6 record and a franchise record-breaking 106 points. Tourigny won a second consecutive OHL Coach of the Year award in 2019–20 going 50–11–1 in a shortened season and earning the CHL Coach of the Year in the process. Dave Cameron is the 67's most recent recipient of the award, taking home the honours after leading the club to their record setting 51-win season in 2022–23. He also won CHL Coach of the Year in that same season.

List of coaches with multiple seasons in parentheses.

- 1967–1972 – Bill Long (5)
- 1972–1974 – Leo Boivin (2)
- 1974–1984 – Brian Kilrea (10, 32 total)
- 1984–1985 – Cliff Stewart & Bob Ellett
- 1985–1986 – Bob Ellett (2)
- 1986–1994 – Brian Kilrea (8, 32 total)
- 1994–1995 – Peter Lee
- 1995–2009 – Brian Kilrea (14, 32 total)
- 2009–2013 – Chris Byrne
- 2014–2017 – Jeff Brown
- 2017–2021 – Andre Tourigny
- 2021–present – Dave Cameron

== Players ==
Denis Potvin and Doug Wilson are the only Ottawa 67's alumni to be inducted into the Hockey Hall of Fame as players.

=== Award winners ===
CHL Player of the Year

- 1975–76 - Peter Lee
- 1977–78 - Bobby Smith
- 1996–97 - Alyn McCauley
- 1998–99 - Brian Campbell
- 2002–03 - Corey Locke

CHL Defenceman of the Year

- 1996–97 - Sean Blanchard
- 2002–03 - Brendan Bell
- 2019–20 - Noel Hoefenmayer

CHL Top Scorer Award

- 2002–03 - Corey Locke
- 2019–20 - Marco Rossi

Red Tilson Trophy
Most Outstanding Player

- 1975–76 - Peter Lee
- 1977–78 - Bobby Smith
- 1979–80 - Jim Fox
- 1987–88 - Andrew Cassels
- 1995–96 - Alyn McCauley
- 1996–97 - Alyn McCauley
- 1998–99 - Brian Campbell
- 2002–03 - Corey Locke
- 2003–04 - Corey Locke
- 2019–20 - Marco Rossi

Eddie Powers Memorial Trophy
Scoring Champion

- 1972–73 - Blake Dunlop
- 1977–78 - Bobby Smith
- 1979–80 - Jim Fox
- 1987–88 - Andrew Cassels
- 2002–03 - Corey Locke
- 2003–04 - Corey Locke
- 2010–11 - Tyler Toffoli
- 2019–20 - Marco Rossi

Jim Mahon Memorial Trophy
Top Scoring Right Winger

- 1975–76 - Peter Lee
- 1979–80 - Jim Fox
- 2002–03 - Matt Foy
- 2010–11 - Tyler Toffoli

Max Kaminsky Trophy
Most Outstanding Defenceman

- 1971–72 - Denis Potvin
- 1972–73 - Denis Potvin
- 1980–81 - Randy Boyd
- 1983–84 - Brad Shaw
- 1990–91 - Chris Snell
- 1996–97 - Sean Blanchard
- 1998–99 - Brian Campbell
- 2002–03 - Brendan Bell
- 2019–20 - Noel Hoefenmayer
- 2022–23 - Pavel Mintyukov

OHL Goaltender of the Year

- 1995–96 - Craig Hillier

Jack Ferguson Award
First Overall Draft Pick

- 1993 - Alyn McCauley
- 2013 - Travis Konecny

Dave Pinkney Trophy
Lowest Team GAA

- 1983–84 - Darren Pang & Greg Coram
- 1996–97 - Tim Keyes & Craig Hillier
- 1997–98 - Craig Hillier & Seamus Kotyk
- 2018–19 - Cedrick Andree & Michael DiPietro
- 2019–20 - Cedrick Andree & Will Cranley
- 2022–23 - Max Donoso & Collin MacKenzie

Emms Family Award
Rookie of the Year

- 1982–83 - Bruce Cassidy
- 1986–87 - Andrew Cassels
- 2013–14 - Travis Konecny

F.W. "Dinty" Moore Trophy
Best Rookie GAA

- 1979–80 - Mike Vezina
- 1997–98 - Seamus Kotyk
- 1998–99 - Levente Szuper
- 2009–10 - Petr Mrazek

Dan Snyder Memorial Trophy
Humanitarian of the Year

- 1999–2000 - Dan Tessier

William Hanley Trophy
Most Sportsmanlike Player

- 1978–79 - Sean Simpson
- 1979–80 - Sean Simpson
- 1987–88 - Andrew Cassels
- 1996–97 - Alyn McCauley
- 1998–99 - Brian Campbell

Leo Lalonde Memorial Trophy
Overage Player of the Year

- 1983–84 - Don McLaren
- 1999–2000 - Dan Tessier
- 2019–20 - Austen Keating

Bobby Smith Trophy
Scholastic Player of the Year

- 1980–81 - Doug Smith
- 1989–90 - Ryan Kuwabara
- 2005–06 - Danny Battochio
- 2016–17 - Sasha Chmelevski

Ivan Tennant Memorial Award
Top Academic High School Player

- 2005–06 - Joe Pleckaitis
- 2013–14 - Adam Craievich with the Guelph Storm
- 2016–17 - Sasha Chmelevski

Roger Neilson Memorial Award
Top Academic College/University Player

- 2004–05 - Danny Battochio
- 2005–06 - Danny Battochio

Wayne Gretzky 99 Award
Playoffs MVP

- 2001 - Seamus Kotyk

=== Retired numbers ===
- Peter Lee (#14)
- Doug Wilson (#7) (Hockey Hall of Fame)
- Denis Potvin (#7) (Hockey Hall of Fame)
- Bobby Smith (#15)
- Brian Campbell (#44)

=== NHL alumni ===
The following players have played at least one game in the National Hockey League;

- Peter Ambroziak
- Kevin Bahl
- Ken Belanger
- Brendan Bell
- Mark Bell
- Bryan Bickell
- Joseph Blandisi
- Rick Bourbonnais
- Randy Boyd
- Nick Boynton
- Brian Campbell
- Andrew Cassels
- Bruce Cassidy
- Cody Ceci
- Sasha Chmelevski
- Graeme Clarke
- Bill Clement
- Logan Couture
- Adam Creighton
- Doug Crossman
- Tyler Cuma
- Randy Cunneyworth
- Michael DiPietro
- Shean Donovan
- Kris Draper
- Blake Dunlop
- John English
- Ted Fauss
- Tye Felhaber
- Connie Forey
- Jim Fox
- Matt Foy
- Sean Gagnon
- Stewart Gavin
- Tyler Graovac
- Dan Gratton
- Alan Hepple
- Tim Higgins
- Warren Holmes
- Ed Hospodar
- Don Howse
- Pierre Jarry
- Yvan Joly
- Derek Joslin
- Lukas Kaspar
- Kevin Kemp
- Bill Kitchen
- Travis Konecny
- Zenon Konopka
- Pete Laframboise
- Michel Larocque
- Guy Larose
- Peter Lee
- Moe Lemay
- Mike Lenarduzzi
- Rick Lessard
- Corey Locke
- Mark Mancari
- Grant Marshall
- Jamie Masters
- Gary McAdam
- Alyn McCauley
- John McFarland
- Jamie McGinn
- Tye McGinn
- Bryan McSheffrey
- Wayne Merrick
- Jacob Middleton
- Petr Mika
- Bob Miller
- Pavel Mintyukov
- Sean Monahan
- Logan Morrison
- Dean Morton
- Petr Mrázek
- Terry Murray
- Jim Nahrgang
- David Nemirovsky
- Nikita Okhotiuk
- Darren Pang
- Mark Paterson
- Steve Payne
- Michael Peca
- Luca Pinelli
- Denis Potvin
- Jean Potvin
- Tom Price
- Shane Prince
- Jack Quinn
- Pat Riggin
- Gary Roberts
- Jim Roberts
- Marco Rossi
- Warren Rychel
- Drake Rymsha
- Luke Sellars
- Brad Shaw
- Chris Simon
- Bjorn Skaare
- Larry Skinner
- Bobby Smith
- Derek Smith
- Doug Smith
- Guy Smith
- Chris Snell
- Brad Staubitz
- Tyler Toffoli
- Ian Turnbull
- Bob Warner
- Steve Washburn
- Kevin Weekes
- Behn Wilson
- Doug Wilson
- Murray Wilson
- Tim Young

== Season-by-season results ==
Regular season and playoffs results:

Legend: GP = Games played, W = Wins, L = Losses, T = Ties, OTL = Overtime losses, SL = Shoot-out losses, Pts = Points, GF = Goals for, GA = Goals against

Memorial Cup champions	OHL champions	OHL finalists

Season	Regular season											Playoffs
Season	GP	W	L	T	OTL	SOL	Pts	Pct	GF	GA	Finish	Playoffs
1967–68	54	6	45	3	–	–	15	0.139	105	329	10th OHA	Did not qualify
1968–69	54	20	28	6	–	–	46	0.426	214	253	8th OHA	Lost quarterfinal (Niagara Falls Flyers) 9–5
1969–70	54	21	23	10	–	–	52	0.481	213	206	5th OHA	Lost quarterfinal (Montreal Junior Canadiens) 8–2
1970–71	62	38	18	6	–	–	82	0.645	296	218	3rd OHA	Won quarterfinal (Hamilton Red Wings) 9–5; Lost semifinal (Toronto Marlboros) 8–0
1971–72	63	33	25	5	–	–	71	0.563	251	216	4th OHA	Won quarterfinal (London Knights) 8–6; Won semifinal (Oshawa Generals) 9–3; Lost OHA final (Peterborough Petes) 8–0
1972–73	63	41	15	7	–	–	89	0.706	391	243	3rd OHA	Won quarterfinal (Sudbury Wolves) 8–0; Lost semifinal (Toronto Marlboros) 8–0
1973–74	70	30	31	9	–	–	69	0.493	293	276	7th OHA	Lost quarterfinal (Peterborough Petes) 9–5
1974–75	70	33	30	7	–	–	73	0.521	379	382	4th OMJHL	Lost quarterfinal (Sudbury Wolves) 8–6
1975–76	66	34	23	9	–	–	77	0.583	331	291	2nd Leyden	Won quarterfinal (Kingston Canadians) 9–5; Lost semifinal (Sudbury Wolves) 8–2
1976–77	66	38	23	5	–	–	81	0.614	348	288	1st Leyden	Won quarterfinal (Sault Ste. Marie Greyhounds) 4–0–1; Won semifinal (Kingston Canadians) 4–3–1; Won OMJHL final (London Knights) 4–2; Lost 1977 Memorial Cup final (New Westminster Bruins) 6–5
1977–78	68	43	18	7	–	–	93	0.684	405	308	1st Leyden	Won quarterfinal (Sault Ste. Marie Greyhounds) 9–7; Lost semifinal (Peterborough Petes) 9–7
1978–79	68	30	38	0	–	–	60	0.441	319	344	4th Leyden	Lost preliminary round (Kingston Canadians) 6–2
1979–80	68	45	20	3	–	–	93	0.684	402	288	2nd Leyden	Won division semifinal (Oshawa Generals) 4–3; Lost division final (Peterborough Petes) 4–0
1980–81	68	45	20	3	–	–	93	0.684	360	264	2nd Leyden	Bye through division quarterfinal Lost division semifinal (Kingston Canadians) 9–5
1981–82	68	47	19	2	–	–	96	0.706	353	248	1st Leyden	Bye through division quarterfinal Won division semifinal (Toronto Marlboros) 8–2; Won division final (Oshawa Generals) 8–6; Lost OHL final (Kitchener Rangers) 9–1
1982–83	70	46	21	3	–	–	95	0.679	395	278	1st Leyden	Bye through division quarterfinal Won division semifinal (Cornwall Royals) 8–0; Lost division final (Oshawa Generals) 8–2
1983–84	70	50	18	2	–	–	102	0.729	347	223	1st Leyden	Bye through division quarterfinal Won division semifinal (Oshawa Generals) 8–0; Won division final (Toronto Marlboros) 8–0; Won OHL final (Kitchener Rangers) 8–2; Won 1984 Memorial Cup final (Kitchener Rangers) 7–2
1984–85	66	20	43	3	–	–	43	0.326	263	376	6th Leyden	Lost division quarterfinal (Peterborough Petes) 9–1
1985–86	66	18	46	2	–	–	38	0.288	274	352	7th Leyden	Did not qualify
1986–87	66	33	28	5	–	–	71	0.538	310	280	3rd Leyden	Won division quarterfinal (Cornwall Royals) 4–1; Lost division semifinal (Peterborough Petes) 4–2
1987–88	66	38	26	2	–	–	78	0.591	341	294	2nd Leyden	Won division quarterfinal (Oshawa Generals) 4–3; Won division semifinal (Cornwall Royals) 4–1; Lost division final (Peterborough Petes) 4–0
1988–89	66	30	32	4	–	–	64	0.485	295	301	5th Leyden	Won division quarterfinal (Oshawa Generals) 4–2; Lost division semifinal (Cornwall Royals) 4–2
1989–90	66	38	26	2	–	–	78	0.591	320	265	4th Leyden	Lost division quarterfinal (Peterborough Petes) 4–0
1990–91	66	39	25	2	–	–	80	0.606	301	280	4th Leyden	Won division quarterfinal (Belleville Bulls) 4–2; Won division semifinal (North Bay Centennials) 4–2; Lost division final (Oshawa Generals) 4–1
1991–92	66	32	30	4	–	–	68	0.515	280	251	6th Leyden	Won division quarterfinal (Cornwall Royals) 4–2; Lost division semifinal (Peterborough Petes) 4–1
1992–93	66	16	42	8	–	–	40	0.303	220	310	8th Leyden	Did not qualify
1993–94	66	33	22	11	–	–	77	0.583	274	229	2nd Leyden	Won division quarterfinal (Peterborough Petes) 4–3; Won division semifinal (Sudbury Wolves) 4–2; Lost division final (North Bay Centennials) 4–1
1994–95	66	22	38	6	–	–	50	0.379	232	276	6th Eastern	Did not qualify
1995–96	66	39	22	5	–	–	83	0.629	258	200	1st Eastern	Bye through division quarterfinal Lost quarterfinal (Belleville Bulls) 4–0
1996–97	66	49	11	6	–	–	104	0.788	320	177	1st Eastern	Won division quarterfinal (Belleville Bulls) 4–2; Won quarterfinal (Barrie Colts) 4–1; Won semifinal (Guelph Storm) 4–3; Lost OHL final (Oshawa Generals) 4–2
1997–98	66	40	17	9	–	–	89	0.674	286	172	1st Eastern	Bye through division quarterfinal Won quarterfinal (Owen Sound Platers) 4–1; Won semifinal (London Knights) 4–0; Lost OHL final (Guelph Storm) 4–1
1998–99	68	48	13	7	–	–	103	0.757	305	164	1st East	Won conference quarterfinal (North Bay Centennials) 4–0; Lost conference semifinal (Belleville Bulls) 4–1; Won 1999 Memorial Cup final (Calgary Hitmen) 7–6 (OT) (Note: Qualified for the 1999 Memorial Cup tournament as the host team)
1999–2000	68	43	20	4	1	–	91	0.662	269	189	1st East	Won conference quarterfinal (Oshawa Generals) 4–1; Lost conference semifinal (Belleville Bulls) 4–2
2000–01	68	33	21	10	4	–	80	0.559	249	201	2nd East	Won conference quarterfinal (North Bay Centennials) 4–0; Won conference semifinal (Belleville Bulls) 4–2; Won conference final (Toronto St. Michael's Majors) 4–0; Won OHL final (Plymouth Whalers) 4–2; Lost 2001 Memorial Cup tie-breaker (Regina Pats) 5–0
2001–02	68	36	20	10	2	–	84	0.603	262	218	2nd East	Won conference quarterfinal (Peterborough Petes) 4–2; Lost conference semifinal (Toronto St. Michael's Majors) 4–3
2002–03	68	44	14	7	3	–	98	0.699	318	210	1st East	Won conference quarterfinal (Mississauga IceDogs) 4–1; Won conference semifinal (Oshawa Generals) 4–2; Won conference final (Toronto St. Michael's Majors) 4–3; Lost OHL final (Kitchener Rangers) 4–1
2003–04	68	29	26	9	4	–	71	0.522	238	220	1st East	Lost conference quarterfinal (Brampton Battalion) 4–3
2004–05	68	34	26	7	1	–	76	0.551	244	210	2nd East	Won conference quarterfinal (Barrie Colts) 4–2; Won conference semifinal (Sudbury Wolves) 4–2; Won conference final (Peterborough Petes) 4–0; Lost OHL final (London Knights) 4–1; Lost 2005 Memorial Cup semifinal (Rimouski Océanic) 7–4 (Note: Qualified for the 2005 Memorial Cup tournament as the OHL playoffs finalist)
2005–06	68	29	31	–	5	3	66	0.485	240	244	4th East	Lost conference quarterfinal (Peterborough Petes) 4–2
2006–07	68	30	34	–	0	4	64	0.471	242	263	4th East	Lost conference quarterfinal (Belleville Bulls) 4–1
2007–08	68	29	34	–	2	3	63	0.463	201	237	3rd East	Lost conference quarterfinal (Oshawa Generals) 4–0
2008–09	68	40	21	–	5	2	87	0.640	272	231	2nd East	Lost conference quarterfinal (Niagara IceDogs) 4–3
2009–10	68	37	23	–	5	3	82	0.603	246	219	1st East	Won conference quarterfinal (Niagara IceDogs) 4–1; Lost conference semifinal (Mississauga St. Michael's Majors) 4–3
2010–11	68	44	19	–	3	2	93	0.684	278	199	1st East	Lost conference quarterfinal (Sudbury Wolves) 4–0
2011–12	68	40	20	–	5	3	88	0.647	268	216	1st East	Won conference quarterfinal (Belleville Bulls) 4–2; Won conference semifinal (Barrie Colts) 4–3; Lost conference final (Niagara IceDogs) 4–1
2012–13	68	16	46	–	0	6	38	0.279	208	323	5th East	Did not qualify
2013–14	68	23	39	–	3	3	52	0.382	222	308	5th East	Did not qualify
2014–15	68	38	25	–	4	1	81	0.596	239	220	2nd East	Lost conference quarterfinal (Niagara IceDogs) 4–2
2015–16	68	36	29	–	2	1	75	0.551	234	219	2nd East	Lost conference quarterfinal (Niagara IceDogs) 4–1
2016–17	68	26	34	–	7	1	60	0.441	221	271	5th East	Lost conference quarterfinal (Mississauga Steelheads) 4–2
2017–18	68	30	29	–	7	2	69	0.507	225	260	4th East	Lost conference quarterfinal (Hamilton Bulldogs) 4–1
2018–19	68	50	12	–	4	2	106	0.779	296	183	1st East	Won conference quarterfinal (Hamilton Bulldogs) 4–0; Won conference semifinal (Sudbury Wolves) 4–0; Won conference final (Oshawa Generals) 4–0; Lost OHL final (Guelph Storm) 4–2
2019–20	62	50	11	–	0	1	101	0.815	296	165	1st East	Playoffs cancelled due to the COVID-19 pandemic
2020–21	Season cancelled due to the COVID-19 pandemic											
2021–22	68	28	31	–	2	7	65	0.478	199	250	4th East	Lost conference quarterfinal (North Bay Battalion) 4–0
2022–23	68	51	12	–	3	2	107	0.787	286	171	1st East	Won conference quarterfinal (Oshawa Generals) 4–1; Lost conference semifinal (Peterborough Petes) 4–2
2023–24	68	36	24	–	6	2	80	0.588	253	228	3rd East	Won conference quarterfinal (Brantford Bulldogs) 4–2; Lost conference semifinal (Oshawa Generals) 4–0
2024–25	68	24	34	–	4	6	58	0.426	203	270	4th East	Did not qualify
2025–26	68	47	15	–	3	3	100	0.735	265	160	2nd East	Won conference quarterfinal (Kingston Frontenacs) 4–0; Lost conference semifinal (Barrie Colts) 4–1

== Uniforms and logos ==
The 67's colours and original uniforms are based on those of the Ottawa Senators from the 1920s and 1930s. The team colours are red, white & black. The 67's dark jerseys, only slightly altered from the original design, have horizontal "barber-pole" stripes with the rectangular 67's logo. The 67's have also used a white background jersey with barber-pole stripes on the shoulders and sleeves.

An alternate jersey was unveiled in 2001. In keeping with their new "Hockey With Bite" slogan, it featured a logo with an angry puck, and a white background body with jagged red and black trim lines along the bottom and arms. It also had an opposite black background style with white & red trim. This third jersey was discontinued in 2012, but the "Angry Puck" motif still features on some 67's merchandise.

Mascots: Riley Raccoon, The Killer Puck

== Arenas ==
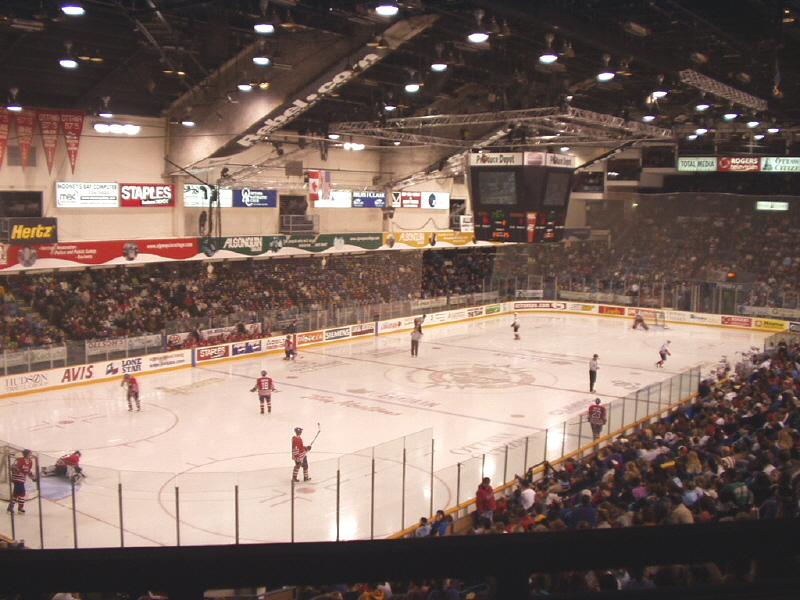
TD Place Arena interior

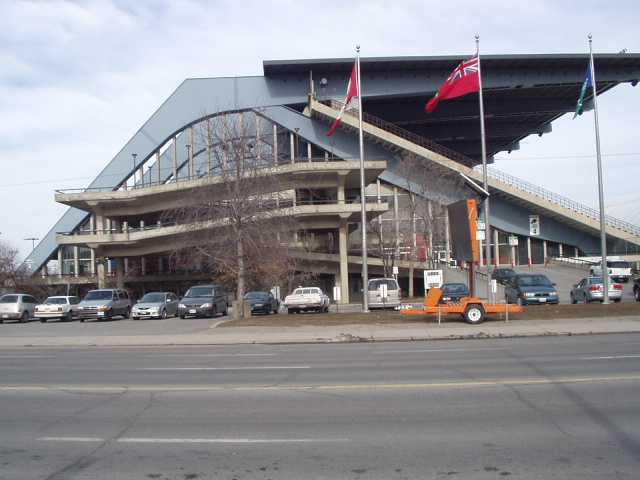
Ottawa TD Place Arena exterior

The Ottawa 67's played the first half of their 1967–68 inaugural season at the Robert Guertin Arena in Hull, Quebec, until completion of the new arena at Lansdowne Park. The Ottawa 67's have played at TD Place Arena since January 1968 when it was known as the Ottawa Civic Centre. The arena has a capacity between 5,500 and 8,585 spectators depending on the configuration. It reached as high as 10,575 for Ottawa Senators games, when the NHL team played in the arena while awaiting the construction of the Canadian Tire Centre. TD Place Arena is built into the side of a football stadium and the seating in TD Place Arena is almost all on the north side and ends of the arena, with very few seats on the south side towards the football stadium.

Over the years, the team has hosted events in other local arenas, such as the Corel Centre (now named the Canadian Tire Centre), where in 2004, they played a game against the Kingston Frontenacs that was viewed by an CHL-record crowd of 20,081. In early February 2012, it was announced that the 67's would move to the Canadian Tire Centre for two seasons while renovations were finished at TD Place Arena. This came as a result of delays in construction originally planned to allow the 67's to stay at TD Place through the rebuild but a closed site was needed to meet deadlines for NASL and CFL expansion. The team returned to TD Place Arena in August 2014 ahead of the 2014–15 season.

== See also ==
- Ice hockey in Ottawa
- List of ice hockey teams in Ontario

== Bibliography ==
- Lapp, Richard M.; Macaulay, Alec (1997). The Memorial Cup: Canada's National Junior Hockey Championship. Madeira Park, British Columbia: Harbour Publishing. ISBN 1-55017-170-4.
