= Milan Hluchý =

Czech ice hockey player

- Born: January 13, 1985 (age 41) Rakovník, Czechoslovakia
- Height: 5 ft 10 in (178 cm)
- Weight: 190 lb (86 kg; 13 st 8 lb)
- Position: Forward
- Shoots: Left
- Czech Extraliga team: HC Karlovy Vary
- Playing career: 2004–present

Milan Hluchý (born January 13, 1985) is a Czech professional ice hockey player. He played with HC Karlovy Vary in the Czech Extraliga during the 2010–11 Czech Extraliga season.
