= Chad LaRose =

American ice hockey player (born 1982)

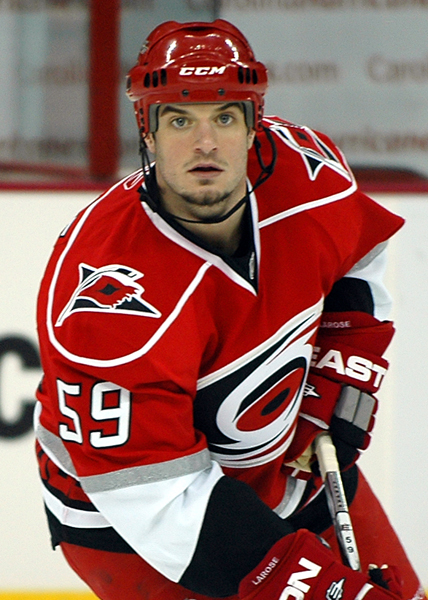
- Born: March 27, 1982 (age 44) Fraser, Michigan, U.S.
- Height: 5 ft 10 in (178 cm)
- Weight: 173 lb (78 kg; 12 st 5 lb)
- Position: Right wing
- Shot: Right
- Played for: Carolina Hurricanes
- National team: United States
- NHL draft: Undrafted
- Playing career: 2003–2017

Chad LaRose (born March 27, 1982) is an American former professional hockey player. He has previously played as a Stanley Cup winner for the Carolina Hurricanes of the National Hockey League (NHL).

== Playing career ==
As a youth, LaRose played in the 1996 Quebec International Pee-Wee Hockey Tournament with the Detroit Compuware minor ice hockey team.

A product of the USHL's Sioux Falls Stampede, LaRose later led the OHL Plymouth Whalers in scoring in 2002–03 with 117 points in 67 games. LaRose was never drafted, but his breakout overage season caught the attention of NHL scouts. He was an invitee to the Detroit Red Wings training camp in 2001 and 2002.

LaRose started the 2003–04 season with the Florida Everblades of the ECHL, and was shuttling back and forth between there and the Lowell Lock Monsters for most of the second half of the year.

LaRose was signed by the Carolina Hurricanes as a free agent in 2003. LaRose is the only hockey player to play for all the Karmanos’ teams, as he started out with the Plymouth Whalers, before moving on to the Florida Everblades, working his way to the Carolina Hurricanes. After winning his first Stanley Cup, LaRose signed a two-year contract to stay a Carolina Hurricanes.

On July 2, 2009, the Hurricanes re-signed LaRose to a further two-year contract worth $3.4 million ($1.5 million in 2009-10 and $1.9 million in 2010-11).

LaRose rejoined the Carolina Hurricanes organization by signing a one-year deal with the team's AHL affiliate, the Charlotte Checkers, on July 29, 2014. In the 2014–15 season, LaRose added a veteran presence to the Checkers while regaining his scoring touch with 20 goals and 38 points in 64 games.

Unable to attain an NHL contract over the summer, LaRose sat out the following season before opting to continue his playing career in the ECHL during the 2016–17 campaign, with the Orlando Solar Bears on January 25, 2017. LaRose was released on February 25, 2017.

== Records ==
- Plymouth Whalers record for most goals in regular season (61 in 2002–03)

== Career statistics ==
=== Regular season and playoffs ===
			Regular season					Playoffs
Season	Team	League	GP	G	A	Pts	PIM	GP	G	A	Pts	PIM
1999–2000	Sioux Falls Stampede	USHL	54	29	26	55	28	3	0	1	1	0
2000–01	Sioux Falls Stampede	USHL	24	11	22	33	50	—	—	—	—	—
2000–01	Plymouth Whalers	OHL	32	18	7	25	24	19	10	10	20	22
2001–02	Plymouth Whalers	OHL	53	32	27	59	40	6	3	4	7	16
2002–03	Plymouth Whalers	OHL	67	61	56	117	52	15	9	8	17	25
2003–04	Lowell Lock Monsters	AHL	36	7	9	16	29	—	—	—	—	—
2003–04	Florida Everblades	ECHL	41	16	19	35	16	14	3	4	7	20
2004–05	Lowell Lock Monsters	AHL	66	20	22	42	32	11	3	5	8	10
2005–06	Carolina Hurricanes	NHL	49	1	12	13	35	21	0	1	1	10
2005–06	Lowell Lock Monsters	AHL	23	14	11	25	10	—	—	—	—	—
2006–07	Carolina Hurricanes	NHL	80	6	12	18	10	—	—	—	—	—
2007–08	Carolina Hurricanes	NHL	58	11	12	23	46	—	—	—	—	—
2008–09	Carolina Hurricanes	NHL	81	19	12	31	35	18	4	7	11	16
2009–10	Carolina Hurricanes	NHL	56	11	17	28	24	—	—	—	—	—
2010–11	Carolina Hurricanes	NHL	82	16	15	31	59	—	—	—	—	—
2011–12	Carolina Hurricanes	NHL	67	19	13	32	48	—	—	—	—	—
2012–13	Carolina Hurricanes	NHL	35	2	2	4	29	—	—	—	—	—
2014–15	Charlotte Checkers	AHL	64	20	18	38	44	—	—	—	—	—
2016–17	Orlando Solar Bears	ECHL	8	0	2	2	6	—	—	—	—	—
AHL totals			189	61	60	121	115	11	3	5	8	10
NHL totals			508	85	95	180	286	39	4	8	12	26

=== International ===
Year	Team	Event	GP	G	A	Pts	PIM
2002	United States	WJC	7	2	2	4	0
2007	United States	WC	7	2	1	3	2

== Awards and honors ==
Award	Year
OHL
Leo Lalonde Memorial Trophy	2003
Plus/Minus Award	2003
NHL
Stanley Cup	2006
