= Jakub Čech =

Czech ice hockey player

- Born: August 13, 1985 (age 40) Olomouc, Czechoslovakia
- Height: 6 ft 1 in (185 cm)
- Weight: 220 lb (100 kg; 15 st 10 lb)
- Position: Goaltender
- Catches: Left
- Czech 2.liga team Former teams: Free agent HC Havířov Panthers; HC Zlin; HC České Budějovice; Orli Znojmo; MHC Martin; Ducs de Dijon; STS Sanok; Piráti Chomutov
- NHL draft: Undrafted
- Playing career: 2001–present

Jakub Čech (born August 13, 1985) is a Czech professional ice hockey goaltender. He is currently a free agent having last played for HC Příbram of the Czech 2.liga.

Čech made his Czech Extraliga debut playing with AZ Havířov during the 2001-02 Czech Extraliga season.
