= Lukáš Bolf =

Czech ice hockey player (born 1985)

- Born: February 20, 1985 (age 41) Vrchlabí, Czechoslovakia
- Height: 6 ft 1 in (185 cm)
- Weight: 209 lb (95 kg; 14 st 13 lb)
- Position: Defence
- Shot: Left
- Played for: HC Sparta Praha; VHK Vsetín; KLH Vajgar Jindřichův Hradec; HC Ceske Budejovice; HC Slovan Ustecti Lvi; HC Berounsti Medvedi; HK Dukla Trencin; HC Ocelari Trinec; Yertis Pavlodar; Arlan Kokshetau
- National team: Czech Republic
- NHL draft: 169th overall, 2003; Pittsburgh Penguins
- Playing career: 2005–2015

Lukáš Bolf (born February 20, 1985) is a Czech former professional ice hockey player who last played for Yertis Pavlodar of the Kazakhstan Hockey Championship. He was selected by the Pittsburgh Penguins in the 6th round (169th overall) of the 2003 NHL entry draft.

Bolf played with HC Sparta Praha in the Czech Extraliga during the 2010–11 Czech Extraliga season.

== Career statistics ==
=== Regular season and playoffs ===
			Regular season					Playoffs
Season	Team	League	GP	G	A	Pts	PIM	GP	G	A	Pts	PIM
1999–2000	HC Becherovka Karlovy Vary	CZE U18	41	2	6	8	82	—	—	—	—	—
1999–2000	HC Becherovka Karlovy Vary	CZE U20	2	0	1	1	0	—	—	—	—	—
2000–01	HC Becherovka Karlovy Vary	CZE U18	25	3	7	10	28	—	—	—	—	—
2000–01	HC Sparta Praha	CZE U18	17	1	6	7	24	—	—	—	—	—
2001–02	HC Sparta Praha	CZE U20	21	2	3	5	35	—	—	—	—	—
2001–02	HPK	FIN U18	6	1	5	6	12	1	0	0	0	0
2001–02	HPK	FIN U20	25	0	4	4	18	5	0	0	0	2
2002–03	HC Sparta Praha	CZE U20	34	3	8	11	22	3	0	0	0	2
2003–04	Barrie Colts	OHL	56	2	18	20	42	12	0	2	2	26
2004–05	Barrie Colts	OHL	56	6	25	31	59	6	0	2	2	8
2005–06	HC Sparta Praha	CZE U20	7	1	6	7	8	—	—	—	—	—
2005–06	HC Sparta Praha	Czech	10	0	0	0	2	—	—	—	—	—
2005–06	Vsetínská hokejová	Czech	25	0	1	1	14	—	—	—	—	—
2005–06	KLH Vajgar Jindřichův Hradec	CZE.2	10	0	0	0	14	—	—	—	—	—
2006–07	Vsetínská hokejová	Czech	24	1	0	1	26	—	—	—	—	—
2006–07	HC Mountfield	Czech	11	2	1	3	12	9	0	0	0	16
2007–08	HC Mountfield	Czech	37	2	0	2	24	3	0	0	0	2
2008–09	HC Sparta Praha	Czech	3	0	0	0	0	—	—	—	—	—
2008–09	HC Slovan Ústečtí Lvi	CZE.2	35	2	13	15	18	6	0	2	2	2
2009–10	HC Sparta Praha	Czech	17	0	0	0	22	—	—	—	—	—
2009–10	HC Berounští Medvědi	CZE.2	35	3	4	7	16	—	—	—	—	—
2010–11	HC Sparta Praha	Czech	1	0	0	0	2	—	—	—	—	—
2010–11	Dukla Trenčín	Slovak	39	2	7	9	22	4	0	0	0	2
2011–12	Dukla Trenčín	Slovak	22	2	1	3	18	—	—	—	—	—
2011–12	HC Oceláři Třinec	Czech	18	3	1	4	10	—	—	—	—	—
2012–13	Yertis Pavlodar	KAZ	52	1	12	13	46	13	0	4	4	16
2013–14	Yertis Pavlodar	KAZ	43	5	16	21	20	5	0	0	0	0
2014–15	Arlan Kokshetau	KAZ	3	0	0	0	6	—	—	—	—	—
Czech totals			146	8	3	11	112	12	0	0	0	18
Slovak totals			61	4	8	12	40	4	0	0	0	2
KAZ totals			98	6	28	34	72	18	0	4	4	16

=== International ===
Year	Team	Event	GP	G	A	Pts	PIM
2003	Czech Republic	WJC18	6	1	2	3	30
2005	Czech Republic	WJC	7	0	4	4	8
Junior totals			13	1	6	7	38
