= Vojtěch Kloz =

Czech ice hockey defenceman (born 1986)

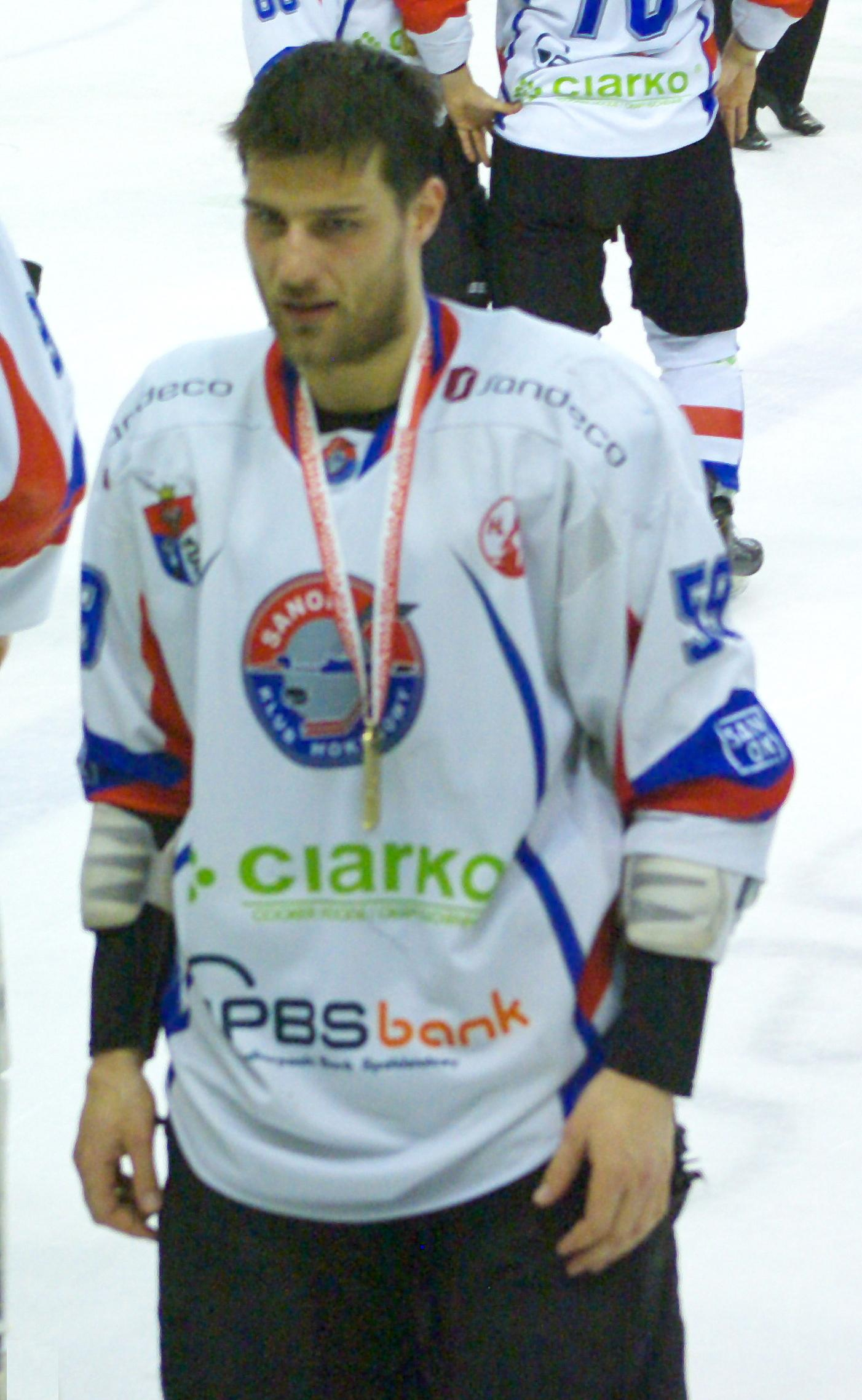
- Kloz at PHL final 2014 Sanok
- Born: January 23, 1986 (age 40) Karlovy Vary, Czechoslovakia
- Height: 6 ft 3 in (191 cm)
- Weight: 254 lb (115 kg; 18 st 2 lb)
- Position: Defence
- Shoots: Left
- Erste Liga team Former teams: DEAC: HC Karlovy Vary; HK 36 Skalica; KH Sanok; HK Nitra; Dauphins d'Épinal; Coventry Blaze; Chamonix HC; Anglet Hormadi Élite
- Playing career: 2005–present

Vojtěch Kloz (born January 23, 1986) is a Czech professional ice hockey defenceman who plays for Hungarian club DEAC of the Erste Liga.

== Career ==
Kloz began his career with his hometown HC Karlovy Vary in their junior setup. He also spent time with the United States Hockey League's Chicago Steel before he was drafted 50th overall by the Ontario Hockey League's Kingston Frontenacs in the 2003 CHL Import Draft. He played one season in the OHL before returning to Karlovy Vary, making his debut for the senior team during the 2005–06 Czech Extraliga season.

In 2010, Kloz moved to the Tipsport Liga in Slovakia with HK 36 Skalica. On April 30, 2012, Kloz made another return to Karlovy Vary. After one season he moved to the Polska Hokej Liga in Poland, signing for KH Sanok on August 28, 2013. On May 19, 2014, Kloz returned to Slovakia to sign with HK Nitra but left after playing just seven games and moved onto France's Ligue Magnus with Dauphins d'Épinal on October 8, 2014.

On August 25, 2017, Kloz signed with the Coventry Blaze of the United Kingdom's Elite Ice Hockey League A year later, he returned to France, signing for Chamonix HC of August 19, 2018. On June 7, 2019, Kloz joined fellow Ligue Magnus side Anglet Hormadi Élite.

In 2020, Kloz moved to Hungary to sign for Erste Liga side DEAC.
