= 2003–04 Boston Bruins season =

NHL team season

2003–04 Boston Bruins
- Northeast Division champions
- Division: 1st Northeast
- Conference: 2nd Eastern
- 2003–04 record: 41–19–15–7
- Home record: 18–12–9–2
- Road record: 23–7–6–5
- Goals for: 209
- Goals against: 188

Team information
- General manager: Mike O'Connell
- Coach: Mike Sullivan
- Captain: Joe Thornton
- Alternate captains: Martin Lapointe; Sean O'Donnell
- Arena: Fleet Center
- Average attendance: 15,133 (86.2%)
- Minor league affiliate: Providence Bruins

Team leaders
- Goals: Glen Murray (32)
- Assists: Joe Thornton (50)
- Points: Joe Thornton (73)
- Penalty minutes: Doug Doull (132)
- Plus/minus: Mike Knuble (+19)
- Wins: Andrew Raycroft (29)
- Goals against average: Andrew Raycroft (2.05)

The 2003–04 Boston Bruins season was the team's 80th season of operation in the National Hockey League (NHL).

== Off-season ==
Mike Sullivan was named the team's new head coach on June 23, 2003.

== Regular season ==
The Bruins had the fewest power-play opportunities of any team in the League, with just 300.

=== Final standings ===
Northeast Division
No.	CR		GP	W	L	T	OTL	GF	GA	Pts
1	2	**Boston Bruins**	82	41	19	15	7	209	188	104
2	4	**Toronto Maple Leafs**	82	45	24	10	3	242	204	103
3	5	**Ottawa Senators**	82	43	23	10	6	262	189	102
4	7	**Montreal Canadiens**	82	41	30	7	4	208	192	93
5	9	Buffalo Sabres	82	37	34	7	4	220	221	85

Note: CR = Conference rank; GP = Games played; W = Wins; L = Losses; T = Ties; OTL = Overtime loss; GF = Goals for; GA = Goals against; Pts = Points
Bolded teams qualified for the playoffs.

Eastern Conference
R		Div	GP	W	L	T	OTL	GF	GA	Pts
**1**	**Z-** Tampa Bay Lightning	**SE**	**82**	**46**	**22**	**8**	**6**	**245**	**192**	106
**2**	**Y-** Boston Bruins	**NE**	**82**	**41**	**19**	**15**	**7**	**209**	**188**	104
**3**	**Y-** Philadelphia Flyers	**AT**	**82**	**40**	**21**	**15**	**6**	**209**	**188**	101
**4**	**X-** Toronto Maple Leafs	**NE**	**82**	**45**	**24**	**10**	**3**	**242**	**204**	103
**5**	**X-** Ottawa Senators	**NE**	**82**	**43**	**23**	**10**	**6**	**262**	**189**	102
**6**	**X-** New Jersey Devils	**AT**	**82**	**43**	**25**	**12**	**2**	**213**	**164**	100
**7**	**X-** Montreal Canadiens	**NE**	**82**	**41**	**30**	**7**	**4**	**208**	**192**	93
**8**	**X-** New York Islanders	**AT**	**82**	**38**	**29**	**11**	**4**	**237**	**210**	91
8.5
9	Buffalo Sabres	NE	82	37	34	7	4	220	221	85
10	Atlanta Thrashers	SE	82	33	37	8	4	214	243	78
11	Carolina Hurricanes	SE	82	28	34	14	6	172	209	76
12	Florida Panthers	SE	82	28	35	15	4	188	221	75
13	New York Rangers	AT	82	27	40	7	8	206	250	69
14	Washington Capitals	SE	82	23	46	10	3	186	253	59
15	Pittsburgh Penguins	AT	82	23	47	8	4	190	303	58

Divisions: AT – Atlantic, NE – Northeast, SE – Southeast

Z – Clinched conference; Y – Clinched division; X – Clinched playoff spot

== Schedule and results ==
=== Regular season ===
2003–04 regular season
October: 6–2–2–1 (home: 0–1–1–1; road: 6–1–1–0)

Game	Date	Score	Opponent	Record	Recap
1	October 8, 2003	3–3 OT	New Jersey Devils (2003–04)	0–0–1–0	T
2	October 10, 2003	1–5	@ Tampa Bay Lightning (2003–04)	0–1–1–0	L
3	October 11, 2003	1–1 OT	@ Florida Panthers (2003–04)	0–1–2–0	T
4	October 15, 2003	2–0	@ Dallas Stars (2003–04)	1–1–2–0	W
5	October 18, 2003	4–3	@ Los Angeles Kings (2003–04)	2–1–2–0	W
6	October 19, 2003	4–3 OT	@ Mighty Ducks of Anaheim (2003–04)	3–1–2–0	W
7	October 21, 2003	4–1	@ Colorado Avalanche (2003–04)	4–1–2–0	W
8	October 23, 2003	0–2	Carolina Hurricanes (2003–04)	4–2–2–0	L
9	October 25, 2003	5–2	@ New Jersey Devils (2003–04)	5–2–2–0	W
10	October 28, 2003	2–0	@ Montreal Canadiens (2003–04)	6–2–2–0	W
11	October 30, 2003	0–1 OT	Montreal Canadiens (2003–04)	6–2–2–1	OTL

November: 5–2–2–3 (home: 4–1–2–0; road: 1–1–0–3)

Game	Date	Score	Opponent	Record	Recap
12	November 1, 2003	2–3 OT	@ Pittsburgh Penguins (2003–04)	6–2–2–2	OTL
13	November 6, 2003	5–5 OT	San Jose Sharks (2003–04)	6–2–3–2	T
14	November 8, 2003	4–1	Dallas Stars (2003–04)	7–2–3–2	W
15	November 11, 2003	4–3	Edmonton Oilers (2003–04)	8–2–3–2	W
16	November 14, 2003	4–0	@ Columbus Blue Jackets (2003–04)	9–2–3–2	W
17	November 15, 2003	2–1 OT	Vancouver Canucks (2003–04)	10–2–3–2	W
18	November 19, 2003	4–5 OT	@ Atlanta Thrashers (2003–04)	10–2–3–3	OTL
19	November 20, 2003	3–2	Washington Capitals (2003–04)	11–2–3–3	W
20	November 22, 2003	2–3	@ Philadelphia Flyers (2003–04)	11–3–3–3	L
21	November 25, 2003	3–4 OT	@ St. Louis Blues (2003–04)	11–3–3–4	OTL
22	November 28, 2003	1–2	Nashville Predators (2003–04)	11–4–3–4	L
23	November 30, 2003	3–3 OT	Phoenix Coyotes (2003–04)	11–4–4–4	T

December: 3–7–5–0 (home: 0–4–3–0; road: 3–3–2–0)

Game	Date	Score	Opponent	Record	Recap
24	December 3, 2003	6–4	@ Atlanta Thrashers (2003–04)	12–4–4–4	W
25	December 4, 2003	0–6	Toronto Maple Leafs (2003–04)	12–5–4–4	L
26	December 6, 2003	1–1 OT	Philadelphia Flyers (2003–04)	12–5–5–4	T
27	December 8, 2003	2–2 OT	Ottawa Senators (2003–04)	12–5–6–4	T
28	December 10, 2003	1–1 OT	@ Florida Panthers (2003–04)	12–5–7–4	T
29	December 11, 2003	5–6	@ Washington Capitals (2003–04)	12–6–7–4	L
30	December 13, 2003	3–2	@ Ottawa Senators (2003–04)	13–6–7–4	W
31	December 16, 2003	1–1 OT	@ Montreal Canadiens (2003–04)	13–6–8–4	T
32	December 18, 2003	0–5	Calgary Flames (2003–04)	13–7–8–4	L
33	December 20, 2003	1–2	Carolina Hurricanes (2003–04)	13–8–8–4	L
34	December 22, 2003	2–4	@ New York Rangers (2003–04)	13–9–8–4	L
35	December 23, 2003	1–1 OT	Tampa Bay Lightning (2003–04)	13–9–9–4	T
36	December 27, 2003	2–4	@ Tampa Bay Lightning (2003–04)	13–10–9–4	L
37	December 29, 2003	3–1	@ Washington Capitals (2003–04)	14–10–9–4	W
38	December 30, 2003	0–3	Ottawa Senators (2003–04)	14–11–9–4	L

January: 10–3–2–0 (home: 6–2–1–0; road: 4–1–1–0)

Game	Date	Score	Opponent	Record	Recap
39	January 1, 2004	3–2	Toronto Maple Leafs (2003–04)	15–11–9–4	W
40	January 3, 2004	3–3 OT	New York Islanders (2003–04)	15–11–10–4	T
41	January 7, 2004	3–0	@ Detroit Red Wings (2003–04)	16–11–10–4	W
42	January 8, 2004	3–1	Pittsburgh Penguins (2003–04)	17–11–10–4	W
43	January 10, 2004	2–1 OT	Detroit Red Wings (2003–04)	18–11–10–4	W
44	January 12, 2004	4–3	Buffalo Sabres (2003–04)	19–11–10–4	W
45	January 15, 2004	1–0	@ Buffalo Sabres (2003–04)	20–11–10–4	W
46	January 17, 2004	0–4	@ Ottawa Senators (2003–04)	20–12–10–4	L
47	January 19, 2004	5–2	New York Rangers (2003–04)	21–12–10–4	W
48	January 20, 2004	4–1	@ New York Rangers (2003–04)	22–12–10–4	W
49	January 22, 2004	2–3	Buffalo Sabres (2003–04)	22–13–10–4	L
50	January 24, 2004	1–2	Florida Panthers (2003–04)	22–14–10–4	L
51	January 27, 2004	2–2 OT	@ New York Islanders (2003–04)	22–14–11–4	T
52	January 29, 2004	2–1 OT	New York Islanders (2003–04)	23–14–11–4	W
53	January 31, 2004	1–0	@ Montreal Canadiens (2003–04)	24–14–11–4	W

February: 7–1–2–3 (home: 3–1–0–1; road: 4–0–2–2)

Game	Date	Score	Opponent	Record	Recap
54	February 1, 2004	4–1	Pittsburgh Penguins (2003–04)	25–14–11–4	W
55	February 3, 2004	5–4	Atlanta Thrashers (2003–04)	26–14–11–4	W
56	February 5, 2004	6–2	@ Buffalo Sabres (2003–04)	27–14–11–4	W
57	February 10, 2004	6–3	@ Pittsburgh Penguins (2003–04)	28–14–11–4	W
58	February 12, 2004	2–3 OT	@ Ottawa Senators (2003–04)	28–14–11–5	OTL
59	February 14, 2004	1–2 OT	@ Chicago Blackhawks (2003–04)	28–14–11–6	OTL
60	February 17, 2004	5–2	@ Toronto Maple Leafs (2003–04)	29–14–11–6	W
61	February 19, 2004	4–3	@ Philadelphia Flyers (2003–04)	30–14–11–6	W
62	February 21, 2004	3–3 OT	@ Carolina Hurricanes (2003–04)	30–14–12–6	T
63	February 23, 2004	0–2	Florida Panthers (2003–04)	30–15–12–6	L
64	February 24, 2004	0–0 OT	@ New York Islanders (2003–04)	30–15–13–6	T
65	February 26, 2004	2–3 OT	Montreal Canadiens (2003–04)	30–15–13–7	OTL
66	February 28, 2004	3–2 OT	Philadelphia Flyers (2003–04)	31–15–13–7	W

March: 9–3–1–0 (home: 5–2–1–0; road: 4–1–0–0)

Game	Date	Score	Opponent	Record	Recap
67	March 2, 2004	2–3	@ Toronto Maple Leafs (2003–04)	31–16–13–7	L
68	March 4, 2004	3–1	New York Rangers (2003–04)	32–16–13–7	W
69	March 6, 2004	2–2 OT	Atlanta Thrashers (2003–04)	32–16–14–7	T
70	March 9, 2004	3–2	@ Nashville Predators (2003–04)	33–16–14–7	W
71	March 11, 2004	3–2 OT	@ Buffalo Sabres (2003–04)	34–16–14–7	W
72	March 13, 2004	3–2 OT	Buffalo Sabres (2003–04)	35–16–14–7	W
73	March 16, 2004	2–1	@ Toronto Maple Leafs (2003–04)	36–16–14–7	W
74	March 18, 2004	0–2	Minnesota Wild (2003–04)	36–17–14–7	L
75	March 20, 2004	5–4	Tampa Bay Lightning (2003–04)	37–17–14–7	W
76	March 23, 2004	4–2	Ottawa Senators (2003–04)	38–17–14–7	W
77	March 25, 2004	0–3	Toronto Maple Leafs (2003–04)	38–18–14–7	L
78	March 27, 2004	3–2 OT	Montreal Canadiens (2003–04)	39–18–14–7	W
79	March 30, 2004	3–2	@ Carolina Hurricanes (2003–04)	40–18–14–7	W

April: 1–1–1–0 (home: 0–1–1–0; road: 1–0–0–0)

Game	Date	Score	Opponent	Record	Recap
80	April 1, 2004	3–3 OT	Washington Capitals (2003–04)	40–18–15–7	T
81	April 3, 2004	2–5	New Jersey Devils (2003–04)	40–19–15–7	L
82	April 4, 2004	3–1	@ New Jersey Devils (2003–04)	41–19–15–7	W

Legend: W Win (2 points) L Loss (0 points) T Tie (1 point) OTL Overtime loss (1 point)

=== Playoffs ===
2004 Stanley Cup playoffs
Eastern Conference Quarterfinals vs. (7) Montreal Canadiens – Canadiens win 4–3

Game	Date	Visitor	Score	Home	OT	Decision	Attendance	Series	Recap
1	April 7	Montreal	3–0	Boston		Raycroft	17,565	Boston leads 1–0	W
2	April 9	Montreal	2–1	Boston	OT	Raycroft	17,565	Boston leads 2–0	W
3	April 11	Boston	3–2	Montreal		Raycroft	21,273	Boston leads 2–1	L
4	April 13	Boston	3–4	Montreal	OT	Raycroft	21,273	Boston leads 3–1	W
5	April 15	Montreal	1–5	Boston		Raycroft	17,565	Boston leads 3–2	L
6	April 17	Boston	2–5	Montreal		Raycroft	21,273	Series tied 3–3	L
7	April 19	Montreal	2–0	Boston		Raycroft	17,565	Montreal wins 4–3	L

Legend: W Win L Loss

== Player statistics ==
=== Scoring ===
- Position abbreviations: C = Center; D = Defense; G = Goaltender; LW = Left wing; RW = Right wing
- † = Joined team via a transaction (e.g., trade, waivers, signing) during the season. Stats reflect time with the Bruins only.
- ‡ = Left team via a transaction (e.g., trade, waivers, release) during the season. Stats reflect time with the Bruins only.

No.	Player	Pos	Regular season						Playoffs					
No.	Player	Pos	GP	G	A	Pts	+/-	PIM	GP	G	A	Pts	+/-	PIM
19	Joe Thornton	C	77	23	50	73	18	98	7	0	0	0	−6	14
27	Glen Murray	RW	81	32	28	60	17	56	7	2	1	3	−2	8
12	Brian Rolston	C	82	19	29	48	9	40	7	1	0	1	−5	8
26	Mike Knuble	RW	82	21	25	46	19	32	7	2	0	2	−5	0
14	Sergei Samsonov	LW	58	17	23	40	12	4	7	2	5	7	2	0
37	Patrice Bergeron	C	71	16	23	39	5	22	7	1	3	4	5	0
44	Nick Boynton	D	81	6	24	30	17	98	7	0	2	2	1	2
6	Dan McGillis	D	80	5	23	28	−1	65	7	0	0	0	−3	2
20	Martin Lapointe	RW	78	15	10	25	−5	67	7	0	0	0	−2	14
11	P. J. Axelsson	LW	68	6	14	20	2	42	7	0	0	0	−2	4
71	Jiri Slegr†	D	36	4	15	19	5	27	7	1	1	2	−1	0
39	Travis Green	C	64	11	5	16	−6	67	7	0	1	1	0	8
23	Jeff Jillson‡	D	50	4	10	14	−1	35	—	—	—	—	—	—
92	Michael Nylander†	C	15	1	11	12	3	14	6	3	3	6	2	0
40	Ted Donato	LW	63	6	5	11	2	18	2	0	0	0	0	0
21	Sean O'Donnell	D	82	1	10	11	10	110	7	0	0	0	1	0
55	Sergei Gonchar†	D	15	4	5	9	6	12	7	1	4	5	−4	4
17	Rob Zamuner	LW	57	4	5	9	3	16	7	0	0	0	−1	0
25	Hal Gill	D	82	2	7	9	16	99	7	0	1	1	−2	4
28	Shaone Morrisonn‡	D	30	1	7	8	10	10	—	—	—	—	—	—
22	Michal Grosek	LW	33	3	2	5	1	33	—	—	—	—	—	—
18	Ian Moran	D	35	1	4	5	3	28	—	—	—	—	—	—
10	Sandy McCarthy‡	RW	37	3	1	4	0	28	—	—	—	—	—	—
33	Craig MacDonald†	LW	18	0	3	3	0	8	1	0	0	0	1	0
52	Carl Corazzini	C	12	2	0	2	2	0	—	—	—	—	—	—
16	Andy Hilbert	C	18	2	0	2	1	9	5	1	0	1	0	0
1	Andrew Raycroft	G	57	0	2	2		0	7	0	0	0		2
56	Doug Doull	LW	35	0	1	1	2	132	—	—	—	—	—	—
54	Sergei Zinovjev	C	10	0	1	1	1	2	—	—	—	—	—	—
36	Ivan Huml	LW	7	0	0	0	−3	6	—	—	—	—	—	—
41	Zdenek Kutlak	D	2	0	0	0	−1	0	—	—	—	—	—	—
55	Patrick Leahy	RW	6	0	0	0	1	0	—	—	—	—	—	—
75	Colton Orr	RW	1	0	0	0	−1	0	—	—	—	—	—	—
29	Felix Potvin	G	28	0	0	0		8	—	—	—	—	—	—
43	Martin Samuelsson	RW	6	0	0	0	−1	0	—	—	—	—	—	—
42	P. J. Stock	C	1	0	0	0	0	0	—	—	—	—	—	—
76	Kris Vernarsky	C	3	0	0	0	−1	0	—	—	—	—	—	—

=== Goaltending ===
No.	Player	Regular season										Playoffs								
No.	Player	GP	W	L	T	SA	GA	GAA	SV%	SO	TOI	GP	W	L	SA	GA	GAA	SV%	SO	TOI
1	Andrew Raycroft	57	29	18	9	1586	117	2.05	.926	3	3420	7	3	4	210	16	2.15	.924	1	447
29	Felix Potvin	28	12	8	6	690	67	2.50	.903	4	1605	—	—	—	—	—	—	—	—	—

== Awards and records ==
=== Awards ===
Type	Award/honor	Recipient	Ref
League (annual)	Calder Memorial Trophy	Andrew Raycroft	
League (annual)	NHL All-Rookie Team	Andrew Raycroft (Goaltender)	
League (in-season)	NHL All-Star Game selection	Nick Boynton	
League (in-season)	NHL All-Star Game selection	Glen Murray (Note: Murray replaced an injured Marian Hossa of the Ottawa Senators.)	
League (in-season)	NHL All-Star Game selection	Joe Thornton (Note: Thornton was voted to the starting lineup.)	
League (in-season)	NHL Defensive Player of the Week	Andrew Raycroft (February 2)	
League (in-season)	NHL Offensive Player of the Week	Glen Murray (February 2)	
League (in-season)	NHL Rookie of the Month	Andrew Raycroft (January)	
League (in-season)	NHL YoungStars Game selection	Patrice Bergeron	
League (in-season)	NHL YoungStars Game selection	Andrew Raycroft	
Team	Eddie Shore Award	Andrew Raycroft	
Team	Elizabeth C. Dufresne Trophy	Andrew Raycroft	
Team	John P. Bucyk Award	Martin Lapointe	
Team	Seventh Player Award	Andrew Raycroft	
Team	Three Stars Awards	Andrew Raycroft (1st)	
Team	Three Stars Awards	Joe Thornton (2nd)	
Team	Three Stars Awards	Glen Murray (3rd)	

=== Milestones ===
Milestone	Player	Date	Ref
First game	Patrice Bergeron	October 8, 2003	
First game	Sergei Zinovjev	October 25, 2003	
First game	Pat Leahy	December 6, 2003	
First game	Doug Doull	December 11, 2003	
First game	Colton Orr	January 8, 2004	
First game	Carl Corazzini	January 15, 2004	

== Transactions ==
The Bruins were involved in the following transactions from June 10, 2003, the day after the deciding game of the 2003 Stanley Cup Finals, through June 7, 2004, the day of the deciding game of the 2004 Stanley Cup Finals.

=== Trades ===
Date	Details		Ref
June 20, 2003	To Los Angeles Kings: Jozef Stumpel; 7th-round pick in 2003	To Boston Bruins: Philadelphia’s 4th-round pick in 2003; Detroit’s 2nd-round pick in 2004	
June 21, 2003	To San Jose Sharks: 1st-round pick in 2003	To Boston Bruins: 1st-round pick in 2003; 2nd-round pick in 2003; 4th-round pick in 2003	
October 3, 2003	To Columbus Blue Jackets: 6th-round pick in 2004	To Boston Bruins: Travis Green	
October 5, 2003	To Florida Panthers: Steve Shields	To Boston Bruins: Future considerations	
January 17, 2004	To Vancouver Canucks: Future considerations	To Boston Bruins: Jiri Slegr	
March 3, 2004	To Washington Capitals: Shaone Morrisonn; 1st-round pick in 2004; 2nd-round pick in 2004	To Boston Bruins: Sergei Gonchar	
March 4, 2004	To Washington Capitals: 4th-round pick in 2005; Conditional draft pick in 2006 (Note: 2nd-round pick.)	To Boston Bruins: Michael Nylander	
March 9, 2004	To San Jose Sharks: Jeff Jillson	To Boston Bruins: Brad Boyes	
March 9, 2004	To San Jose Sharks: 9th-round pick in 2005	To Boston Bruins: Andy Delmore	

=== Players acquired ===
Date	Player	Former team	Term	Via	Ref
July 22, 2003	Ted Donato	New York Rangers	1-year	Free agency	
July 28, 2003	Doug Doull	Toronto Maple Leafs	1-year	Free agency	
July 28, 2003	Pat Leahy	Providence Bruins (AHL)	1-year	Free agency	
July 28, 2003	Robert Liscak	Providence Bruins (AHL)	2-year	Free agency	
July 31, 2003	Ed Campbell	Detroit Red Wings	1-year	Free agency	
August 12, 2003	Sandy McCarthy	New York Rangers	1-year	Free agency	
September 3, 2003	Felix Potvin	Los Angeles Kings	1-year	Free agency	
January 20, 2004	Craig MacDonald	Florida Panthers		Waivers	

=== Players lost ===
Date	Player	New team	Via (Note: In parentheses is the player's free agency group on July 1 if applicable.)	Ref
N/A	Marty McInnis (Note: McInnis retired.)		Buyout	
N/A	Krzysztof Oliwa	Calgary Flames (Note: Oliwa signed with Calgary on July 30.)	Buyout	
July 1, 2003	Jeff Hackett	Philadelphia Flyers	Free agency (III)	
July 1, 2003	Brantt Myhres (Note: Myhres was inactive during the 2003–04 season.)		Contract expiration (UFA)	
July 14, 2003	Don Sweeney	Dallas Stars	Free agency (III)	
July 24, 2003	Sean Brown	New Jersey Devils	Free agency (UFA)	
July 24, 2003	Lee Goren	Florida Panthers	Free agency (VI)	
August 12, 2003	Bryan Berard	Chicago Blackhawks (Note: Berard signed with Chicago on October 31, 2003.)	Release (II) (Note: Berard received a $2.51 million arbitration award on August 8. Boston elected to “walk away” from the award, making Berard an unrestricted free agent.)	
September 5, 2003	Chris Kelleher	Krefeld Pinguine (DEL)	Free agency (VI)	
March 9, 2004	Sandy McCarthy	New York Rangers	Waivers	
May 5, 2004	Zdenek Kutlak	HC Karlovy Vary (ELH)	Free agency (Note: The Bruins retained Kutlak’s NHL rights through the 2007–08 season.)	
May 17, 2004	Tim Thomas	Jokerit (Liiga)	Free agency	

=== Signings ===
Date	Player	Term	Contract type	Ref
June 30, 2003	P. J. Stock	2-year	Re-signing	
June 30, 2003	Darren Van Oene	1-year	Option exercised	
July 10, 2003	Hannu Toivonen	3-year	Entry-level	
July 10, 2003	Sergei Zinovjev	2-year	Entry-level	
July 14, 2003	P. J. Axelsson	2-year	Re-signing	
July 15, 2003	Jonathan Girard	1-year	Re-signing	
July 15, 2003	Michal Grosek	1-year	Re-signing	
July 23, 2003	Hal Gill	1-year	Re-signing	
July 28, 2003	Ian Moran	1-year	Re-signing	
July 31, 2003	Zdenek Kutlak	1-year	Re-signing	
July 31, 2003	Andrew Raycroft	1-year	Re-signing	
August 12, 2003	Brian Rolston	1-year	Arbitration award	
September 2, 2003	Tim Thomas	1-year	Re-signing	
September 7, 2003	Carl Corazzini		Re-signing	
September 11, 2003	Sergei Samsonov	1-year	Re-signing	
September 30, 2003	Nick Boynton	2-year	Re-signing	
October 6, 2003	Patrice Bergeron	3-year	Entry-level	

== Draft picks ==
Boston's draft picks at the 2003 NHL entry draft held at the Gaylord Entertainment Center in Nashville, Tennessee.

Round	#	Player	Nationality	College/Junior/Club team (League)
1	21	Mark Stuart	United States	Colorado College (WCHA)
2	45	Patrice Bergeron	Canada	Acadie–Bathurst Titan (QMJHL)
2	66	Masi Marjamaki	Finland	Red Deer Rebels (WHL)
4	107	Byron Bitz	Canada	Nanaimo Clippers (BCHL)
4	118	Frank Rediker	United States	Windsor Spitfires (OHL)
4	129	Patrik Valcak	Czech Republic	HC Vítkovice Jr. (Czech Republic)
5	153	Mike Brown	United States	Saginaw Spirit (OHL)
6	183	Nate Thompson	United States	Seattle Thunderbirds (WHL)
8	247	Benoit Mondou	Canada	Shawinigan Cataractes (QMJHL)
9	277	Kevin Regan	United States	Saint Sebastian's School (USHS-MA)

== See also ==
- 2003–04 NHL season
