= 2003–04 Buffalo Sabres season =

NHL hockey team season

2003-04 Buffalo Sabres
- Division: 5th Northeast
- Conference: 9th Eastern
- 2003-04 record: 37–34–7–4
- Home record: 21–16–4–3
- Road record: 16–21–3–1
- Goals for: 220
- Goals against: 221

Team information
- General manager: Darcy Regier
- Coach: Lindy Ruff
- Captain: Rotating; Miroslav Satan (Oct.); Chris Drury (Nov., Mar.–Apr.); James Patrick (Dec.); Jean-Pierre Dumont (Jan.); Daniel Briere (Feb.)
- Arena: HSBC Arena
- Average attendance: 15,289
- Minor league affiliate: Rochester Americans

Team leaders
- Goals: Miroslav Satan (29)
- Assists: Daniel Briere and Jochen Hecht (37)
- Points: Daniel Briere
- Penalty minutes: Andrew Peters (151)
- Plus/minus: Jochen Hecht
- Wins: Martin Biron (26)
- Goals against average: Martin Biron (2.52)

The 2003–04 Buffalo Sabres season was the 34th season of operation for the National Hockey League (NHL) franchise that was established on May 22, 1970. The Sabres failed to qualify for the playoffs for the third consecutive season.

== Regular season ==
On March 17, 2004, Derek Roy scored just 15 seconds into the overtime period to give the Sabres a 4–3 road win over the Atlanta Thrashers. Roy tied the Blackhawks' Mark Bell, who had also scored 15 seconds into the overtime period in Chicago's 4–3 home win over the Detroit Red Wings on December 11, 2003. Both goals would end up being the fastest overtime goals scored during the 2003-04 NHL regular season.

=== Final standings ===
Northeast Division
No.	CR		GP	W	L	T	OTL	GF	GA	Pts
1	2	**Boston Bruins**	82	41	19	15	7	209	188	104
2	4	**Toronto Maple Leafs**	82	45	24	10	3	242	204	103
3	5	**Ottawa Senators**	82	43	23	10	6	262	189	102
4	7	**Montreal Canadiens**	82	41	30	7	4	208	192	93
5	9	Buffalo Sabres	82	37	34	7	4	220	221	85

Note: CR = Conference rank; GP = Games played; W = Wins; L = Losses; T = Ties; OTL = Overtime loss; GF = Goals for; GA = Goals against; Pts = Points
Bolded teams qualified for the playoffs.

Eastern Conference
R		Div	GP	W	L	T	OTL	GF	GA	Pts
**1**	**Z-** Tampa Bay Lightning	**SE**	**82**	**46**	**22**	**8**	**6**	**245**	**192**	106
**2**	**Y-** Boston Bruins	**NE**	**82**	**41**	**19**	**15**	**7**	**209**	**188**	104
**3**	**Y-** Philadelphia Flyers	**AT**	**82**	**40**	**21**	**15**	**6**	**209**	**188**	101
**4**	**X-** Toronto Maple Leafs	**NE**	**82**	**45**	**24**	**10**	**3**	**242**	**204**	103
**5**	**X-** Ottawa Senators	**NE**	**82**	**43**	**23**	**10**	**6**	**262**	**189**	102
**6**	**X-** New Jersey Devils	**AT**	**82**	**43**	**25**	**12**	**2**	**213**	**164**	100
**7**	**X-** Montreal Canadiens	**NE**	**82**	**41**	**30**	**7**	**4**	**208**	**192**	93
**8**	**X-** New York Islanders	**AT**	**82**	**38**	**29**	**11**	**4**	**237**	**210**	91
8.5
9	Buffalo Sabres	NE	82	37	34	7	4	220	221	85
10	Atlanta Thrashers	SE	82	33	37	8	4	214	243	78
11	Carolina Hurricanes	SE	82	28	34	14	6	172	209	76
12	Florida Panthers	SE	82	28	35	15	4	188	221	75
13	New York Rangers	AT	82	27	40	7	8	206	250	69
14	Washington Capitals	SE	82	23	46	10	3	186	253	59
15	Pittsburgh Penguins	AT	82	23	47	8	4	190	303	58

Divisions: AT – Atlantic, NE – Northeast, SE – Southeast

Z – Clinched conference; Y – Clinched division; X – Clinched playoff spot

== Schedule and results ==
2003–04 regular season
October: 6–5–0–0 (home: 2–2–0–0; road: 4–3–0–0)

Game	Date	Score	Opponent	Record	Recap
1	October 9, 2003	0–2	@ Philadelphia Flyers (2003–04)	0–1–0–0	L
2	October 11, 2003	0–6	New York Islanders (2003–04)	0–2–0–0	L
3	October 13, 2003	4–3	Dallas Stars (2003–04)	1–2–0–0	W
4	October 16, 2003	1–4	@ Edmonton Oilers (2003–04)	1–3–0–0	L
5	October 18, 2003	2–0	@ Calgary Flames (2003–04)	2–3–0–0	W
6	October 20, 2003	1–6	@ Vancouver Canucks (2003–04)	2–4–0–0	L
7	October 23, 2003	5–1	@ Los Angeles Kings (2003–04)	3–4–0–0	W
8	October 24, 2003	5–2	@ Mighty Ducks of Anaheim (2003–04)	4–4–0–0	W
9	October 26, 2003	3–1	@ Colorado Avalanche (2003–04)	5–4–0–0	W
10	October 28, 2003	1–3	Minnesota Wild (2003–04)	5–5–0–0	L
11	October 30, 2003	5–3	Toronto Maple Leafs (2003–04)	6–5–0–0	W

November: 5–6–2–1 (home: 4–1–1–1; road: 1–5–1–0)

Game	Date	Score	Opponent	Record	Recap
12	November 1, 2003	1–1 OT	@ Ottawa Senators (2003–04)	6–5–1–0	T
13	November 5, 2003	4–7	Atlanta Thrashers (2003–04)	6–6–1–0	L
14	November 7, 2003	2–1	Montreal Canadiens (2003–04)	7–6–1–0	W
15	November 8, 2003	0–3	@ Montreal Canadiens (2003–04)	7–7–1–0	L
16	November 12, 2003	2–2 OT	New Jersey Devils (2003–04)	7–7–2–0	T
17	November 14, 2003	1–2 OT	Pittsburgh Penguins (2003–04)	7–7–2–1	OTL
18	November 17, 2003	2–1	@ Ottawa Senators (2003–04)	8–7–2–1	W
19	November 19, 2003	1–4	@ New Jersey Devils (2003–04)	8–8–2–1	L
20	November 21, 2003	5–0	Carolina Hurricanes (2003–04)	9–8–2–1	W
21	November 22, 2003	1–2	@ Tampa Bay Lightning (2003–04)	9–9–2–1	L
22	November 24, 2003	1–2	@ Florida Panthers (2003–04)	9–10–2–1	L
23	November 26, 2003	5–2	Washington Capitals (2003–04)	10–10–2–1	W
24	November 28, 2003	4–3	Florida Panthers (2003–04)	11–10–2–1	W
25	November 29, 2003	1–4	@ Nashville Predators (2003–04)	11–11–2–1	L

December: 4–8–1–0 (home: 2–5–1–0; road: 2–3–0–0)

Game	Date	Score	Opponent	Record	Recap
26	December 3, 2003	3–2	@ Chicago Blackhawks (2003–04)	12–11–2–1	W
27	December 4, 2003	2–3	Phoenix Coyotes (2003–04)	12–12–2–1	L
28	December 6, 2003	1–3	Tampa Bay Lightning (2003–04)	12–13–2–1	L
29	December 10, 2003	2–7	Detroit Red Wings (2003–04)	12–14–2–1	L
30	December 12, 2003	1–3	New York Rangers (2003–04)	12–15–2–1	L
31	December 13, 2003	2–3	@ Minnesota Wild (2003–04)	12–16–2–1	L
32	December 16, 2003	1–2	@ Pittsburgh Penguins (2003–04)	12–17–2–1	L
33	December 19, 2003	2–5	New Jersey Devils (2003–04)	12–18–2–1	L
34	December 23, 2003	2–2 OT	Ottawa Senators (2003–04)	12–18–3–1	T
35	December 26, 2003	3–1	Carolina Hurricanes (2003–04)	13–18–3–1	W
36	December 27, 2003	3–1	@ Washington Capitals (2003–04)	14–18–3–1	W
37	December 29, 2003	1–2	@ Carolina Hurricanes (2003–04)	14–19–3–1	L
38	December 31, 2003	7–1	Washington Capitals (2003–04)	15–19–3–1	W

January: 8–6–2–0 (home: 5–1–1–0; road: 3–5–1–0)

Game	Date	Score	Opponent	Record	Recap
39	January 2, 2004	5–2	Mighty Ducks of Anaheim (2003–04)	16–19–3–1	W
40	January 3, 2004	3–3 OT	@ Toronto Maple Leafs (2003–04)	16–19–4–1	T
41	January 6, 2004	1–3	@ Montreal Canadiens (2003–04)	16–20–4–1	L
42	January 7, 2004	1–1 OT	Philadelphia Flyers (2003–04)	16–20–5–1	T
43	January 9, 2004	3–2	Ottawa Senators (2003–04)	17–20–5–1	W
44	January 12, 2004	3–4	@ Boston Bruins (2003–04)	17–21–5–1	L
45	January 13, 2004	6–2	Philadelphia Flyers (2003–04)	18–21–5–1	W
46	January 15, 2004	0–1	Boston Bruins (2003–04)	18–22–5–1	L
47	January 17, 2004	2–4	@ New York Islanders (2003–04)	18–23–5–1	L
48	January 20, 2004	1–4	@ Atlanta Thrashers (2003–04)	18–24–5–1	L
49	January 22, 2004	3–2	@ Boston Bruins (2003–04)	19–24–5–1	W
50	January 24, 2004	1–2	@ Philadelphia Flyers (2003–04)	19–25–5–1	L
51	January 25, 2004	4–2	@ Carolina Hurricanes (2003–04)	20–25–5–1	W
52	January 27, 2004	4–1	Montreal Canadiens (2003–04)	21–25–5–1	W
53	January 30, 2004	3–1	@ New York Rangers (2003–04)	22–25–5–1	W
54	January 31, 2004	3–1	New York Rangers (2003–04)	23–25–5–1	W

February: 5–5–1–0 (home: 4–2–1–0; road: 1–3–0–0)

Game	Date	Score	Opponent	Record	Recap
55	February 5, 2004	2–6	Boston Bruins (2003–04)	23–26–5–1	L
56	February 10, 2004	2–1	San Jose Sharks (2003–04)	24–26–5–1	W
57	February 13, 2004	8–3	Los Angeles Kings (2003–04)	25–26–5–1	W
58	February 14, 2004	6–4	@ Toronto Maple Leafs (2003–04)	26–26–5–1	W
59	February 16, 2004	7–2	Atlanta Thrashers (2003–04)	27–26–5–1	W
60	February 18, 2004	1–1 OT	Florida Panthers (2003–04)	27–26–6–1	T
61	February 20, 2004	4–3 OT	Tampa Bay Lightning (2003–04)	28–26–6–1	W
62	February 21, 2004	1–4	@ New York Islanders (2003–04)	28–27–6–1	L
63	February 25, 2004	2–8	@ New Jersey Devils (2003–04)	28–28–6–1	L
64	February 27, 2004	2–4	New York Islanders (2003–04)	28–29–6–1	L
65	February 28, 2004	1–7	@ Ottawa Senators (2003–04)	28–30–6–1	L

March: 9–2–1–3 (home: 4–1–0–2; road: 5–1–1–1)

Game	Date	Score	Opponent	Record	Recap
66	March 3, 2004	4–3	Ottawa Senators (2003–04)	29–30–6–1	W
67	March 6, 2004	5–1	@ Toronto Maple Leafs (2003–04)	30–30–6–1	W
68	March 7, 2004	1–5	St. Louis Blues (2003–04)	30–31–6–1	L
69	March 10, 2004	6–0	@ Washington Capitals (2003–04)	31–31–6–1	W
70	March 11, 2004	2–3 OT	Boston Bruins (2003–04)	31–31–6–2	OTL
71	March 13, 2004	2–3 OT	@ Boston Bruins (2003–04)	31–31–6–3	OTL
72	March 15, 2004	5–6 OT	Toronto Maple Leafs (2003–04)	31–31–6–4	OTL
73	March 17, 2004	4–3 OT	@ Atlanta Thrashers (2003–04)	32–31–6–4	W
74	March 18, 2004	1–3	@ Tampa Bay Lightning (2003–04)	32–32–6–4	L
75	March 20, 2004	2–1	@ Florida Panthers (2003–04)	33–32–6–4	W
76	March 24, 2004	2–1	Montreal Canadiens (2003–04)	34–32–6–4	W
77	March 26, 2004	5–1	Pittsburgh Penguins (2003–04)	35–32–6–4	W
78	March 27, 2004	2–2 OT	@ Pittsburgh Penguins (2003–04)	35–32–7–4	T
79	March 29, 2004	6–0	Columbus Blue Jackets (2003–04)	36–32–7–4	W
80	March 31, 2004	4–3	@ New York Rangers (2003–04)	37–32–7–4	W

April: 0–2–0–0 (home: 0–1–0–0; road: 0–1–0–0)

Game	Date	Score	Opponent	Record	Recap
81	April 2, 2004	0–2	Toronto Maple Leafs (2003–04)	37–33–7–4	L
82	April 3, 2004	3–6	@ Montreal Canadiens (2003–04)	37–34–7–4	L

Legend: W Win (2 points) L Loss (0 points) T Tie (1 point) OTL Overtime loss (1 point)

== Player statistics ==
=== Scoring ===
- Position abbreviations: C = Center; D = Defense; G = Goaltender; LW = Left wing; RW = Right wing
- † = Joined team via a transaction (e.g., trade, waivers, signing) during the season. Stats reflect time with the Sabres only.
- ‡ = Left team via a transaction (e.g., trade, waivers, release) during the season. Stats reflect time with the Sabres only.

No.	Player	Pos	Regular season					
No.	Player	Pos	GP	G	A	Pts	+/-	PIM
48	Daniel Briere	C	82	28	37	65	−7	70
81	Miroslav Satan	LW	82	29	28	57	−15	30
17	Jean-Pierre Dumont	RW	77	22	31	53	−9	40
23	Chris Drury	C	76	18	35	53	8	68
55	Jochen Hecht	LW	64	15	37	52	17	49
45	Dmitri Kalinin	D	77	10	24	34	0	42
61	Maxim Afinogenov	RW	73	17	14	31	−4	57
44	Alexei Zhitnik	D	68	4	24	28	−13	102
12	Ales Kotalik	RW	62	15	11	26	−1	41
37	Curtis Brown‡	C	68	9	12	21	2	30
24	Taylor Pyatt	LW	63	8	12	20	−7	25
22	Adam Mair	C	81	6	14	20	−3	146
9	Derek Roy	C	49	9	10	19	−8	12
16	Chris Taylor	C	54	6	6	12	−2	22
8	Rory Fitzpatrick	D	60	4	7	11	−5	44
3	James Patrick	D	55	4	7	11	11	12
51	Brian Campbell	D	53	3	8	11	−8	12
10	Henrik Tallinder	D	72	1	9	10	5	26
15	Milan Bartovic	RW	23	1	8	9	1	18
25	Mike Grier†	RW	14	1	8	9	10	4
5	Andy Delmore‡	D	37	2	5	7	−5	29
74	Jay McKee	D	43	2	3	5	6	41
28	Jason Botterill	LW	19	2	1	3	0	14
26	Eric Boulton	LW	44	1	2	3	−2	110
34 (Note: Jillson wore number 5 in his Sabres debut.)	Jeff Jillson†	D	14	0	3	3	−3	19
76	Andrew Peters	LW	42	2	0	2	−3	151
43	Martin Biron	G	52	0	2	2		10
4	Brad Brown†	D	13	0	2	2	3	12
35	Mika Noronen	G	35	1	0	1		0
33	Doug Janik	D	4	0	0	0	0	19
30	Ryan Miller	G	3	0	0	0		0
19	Norm Milley	RW	2	0	0	0	0	2
38	Domenic Pittis	C	4	0	0	0	−1	4
29	Jason Pominville	RW	1	0	0	0	0	0

=== Goaltending ===
No.	Player	Regular season									
No.	Player	GP	W	L	T	SA	GA	GAA	SV%	SO	TOI
43	Martin Biron	52	26	18	5	1442	125	2.52	.913	2	2971:46
35	Mika Noronen	35	11	17	2	821	77	2.57	.906	2	1796:15
30	Ryan Miller	3	0	3	0	73	15	5.06	.795	0	177:51

== Awards and records ==
=== Awards ===
Type	Award/honor	Recipient	Ref
League (in-season)	NHL Defensive Player of the Week	Martin Biron (October 27)	
League (in-season)	NHL YoungStars Game selection	Derek Roy	

=== Milestones ===
Milestone	Player	Date	Ref
First game	Andrew Peters	October 9, 2003	
First game	Derek Roy	December 13, 2003	
First game	Jason Pominville	December 27, 2003	

== Transactions ==
The Sabres were involved in the following transactions from June 10, 2003, the day after the deciding game of the 2003 Stanley Cup Finals, through June 7, 2004, the day of the deciding game of the 2004 Stanley Cup Finals.

=== Trades ===
Date	Details		Ref
June 27, 2003	To Nashville Predators: 3rd-round pick in 2004	To Buffalo Sabres: Andy Delmore	
July 3, 2003	To Colorado Avalanche: Rights to Keith Ballard	To Buffalo Sabres: Steven Reinprecht	
July 3, 2003	To Calgary Flames: Steven Reinprecht; Rhett Warrener	To Buffalo Sabres: Steve Begin; Chris Drury	
March 8, 2004	To Minnesota Wild: 4th-round pick in 2005	To Buffalo Sabres: Brad Brown; 6th-round pick in 2005	
March 9, 2004	To San Jose Sharks: Curtis Brown; Andy Delmore	To Buffalo Sabres: Jeff Jillson; 9th-round pick in 2005	
March 9, 2004	To Washington Capitals: Rights to Jakub Klepis	To Buffalo Sabres: Mike Grier	

=== Players acquired ===
Date	Player	Former team	Term	Via	Ref
July 12, 2003	Joel Bouchard	Pittsburgh Penguins	1-year	Free agency	
July 14, 2003	Domenic Pittis	Nashville Predators	1-year	Free agency	
July 15, 2003	David Cullen	Minnesota Wild	1-year	Free agency	
August 22, 2003	Brian Chapman	Manitoba Moose (AHL)	1-year	Free agency	
August 22, 2003	Rick Mrozik	Calgary Flames	1-year	Free agency	
October 17, 2003	Scott Ricci	Milwaukee Admirals (AHL)		Free agency	

=== Players lost ===
Date	Player	New team	Via (Note: In parentheses is the player's free agency group on July 1 if applicable.)	Ref
July 2, 2003	Radoslav Hecl	HC Slovan Bratislava (SVK)	Free agency (UFA)	
July 5, 2003	Denis Hamel	Ottawa Senators	Free agency (UFA)	
August 11, 2003	Peter Ratchuk	Frankfurt Lions (DEL)	Free agency (VI)	
August 18, 2003	Francois Methot	Washington Capitals	Free agency (VI)	
August 27, 2003	Doug Houda		Retirement (III)	
October 3, 2003	Steve Begin	Montreal Canadiens	Waiver draft	
October 3, 2003	Joel Bouchard	New York Rangers	Waiver draft	
April 5, 2004	Domenic Pittis	Kloten Flyers (NLA)	Free agency	

=== Signings ===
Date	Player	Term	Contract type	Ref
June 30, 2003	Brian Campbell	1-year	Option exercised	
July 3, 2003	Rory Fitzpatrick		Re-signing	
July 10, 2003	Jason Botterill	1-year	Re-signing	
July 10, 2003	Chris Taylor	1-year	Re-signing	
July 31, 2003	Steve Begin	1-year	Re-signing	
July 31, 2003	Tim Connolly	1-year	Re-signing	
July 31, 2003	Dmitri Kalinin	1-year	Re-signing	
July 31, 2003	Adam Mair	3-year	Re-signing	
July 31, 2003	Taylor Pyatt	1-year	Re-signing	
August 1, 2003	Eric Boulton	2-year	Re-signing	
August 1, 2003	Henrik Tallinder	1-year	Re-signing	
August 7, 2003	Tom Askey	2-year	Re-signing	
August 7, 2003	Andrew Peters		Re-signing	
August 8, 2003	Curtis Brown	1-year	Re-signing	
August 8, 2003	Ales Kotalik	1-year (Note: Club option for a second year.)	Re-signing	
August 25, 2003	Chris Drury	4-year	Re-signing	
September 15, 2003	Norm Milley	1-year	Re-signing	
September 24, 2003	Jay McKee	multi-year	Re-signing	
September 29, 2003	Miroslav Satan	2-year	Re-signing	
October 17, 2003	Nathan Paetsch		Entry-level	

== Draft picks ==
Buffalo's draft picks at the 2003 NHL entry draft held at the Gaylord Entertainment Center in Nashville, Tennessee.

Round	#	Player	Nationality	College/Junior/Club team (League)
1	5	Thomas Vanek	Austria	University of Minnesota (NCAA)
2	65	Branislav Fabry	Slovakia	Slovan Bratislava (Slovakia)
3	74	Clarke MacArthur	Canada	Medicine Hat Tigers (WHL)
4	106	Jan Hejda	Czech Republic	Slavia Praha (Czech Republic)
4	114	Denis Ezhov	Russia	Lada Togliatti (Russia)
5	150	Thomas Morrow	United States	Des Moines Buccaneers (USHL)
6	172	Pavel Voroshnin	Russia	Mississauga IceDogs (OHL)
7	202	Nathan Paetsch	Canada	Moose Jaw Warriors (WHL)
8	235	Jeff Weber	Canada	Plymouth Whalers (OHL)
9	266	Louis-Philippe Martin	Canada	Baie-Comeau Drakkar (QMJHL)

== See also ==
- 2003–04 NHL season
