= 2003–04 Carolina Hurricanes season =

National Hockey League team season

2003–04 Carolina Hurricanes
- Division: 3rd Southeast
- Conference: 11th Eastern
- 2003–04 record: 28–34–14–6
- Home record: 13–18–8–2
- Road record: 15–16–6–4
- Goals for: 172
- Goals against: 209

Team information
- General manager: Jim Rutherford
- Coach: Paul Maurice (Oct.–Dec.); Peter Laviolette (Dec.–Apr.)
- Captain: Ron Francis (Oct.–Mar.); Vacant (Mar.–Apr.)
- Alternate captains: Rod Brind'Amour; Glen Wesley
- Arena: RBC Center
- Average attendance: 12,330
- Minor league affiliates: Lowell Lock Monsters; Florida Everblades

Team leaders
- Goals: Josef Vasicek (19)
- Assists: Josef Vasicek; Rod Brind'Amour; Sean Hill (26)
- Points: Josef Vasicek (45)
- Penalty minutes: Jesse Boulerice (127)
- Plus/minus: Glen Wesley (+18)
- Wins: Kevin Weekes (23)
- Goals against average: Kevin Weekes (2.33)

The 2003–04 Carolina Hurricanes season was the franchise's 25th season in the National Hockey League and seventh as the Hurricanes. The Hurricanes missed the playoffs for the second consecutive year.

== Regular season ==
On December 15, 2003, head coach Paul Maurice was fired after an 8–12–8–2 start to the season and replaced by former New York Islanders head coach Peter Laviolette.

The Hurricanes season finale against the Florida Panthers on April 4, 2004 was the final tie in NHL history. The Hurricane player who scored the final game-tying goal to make it 6–6 was defenseman Brad Fast, who was playing in his first and what proved to be his only NHL game. Fast is one of only five NHL one-gamers to score a goal in their lone NHL appearance. Ties were eliminated after the 2004–05 NHL lockout when the shootout was adopted.

The Hurricanes finished 30th overall in the NHL in scoring for the second consecutive season, with just 172 goals for. The top goal scorer for the team, Josef Vasicek, only scored 19 goals. They also struggled on the power-play, finishing 30th overall in power-play goals scored, with 41, and 30th overall in power-play percentage, at 10.68% (41 for 384).

=== Final standings ===
Southeast Division
No.	CR		GP	W	L	T	OTL	GF	GA	PTS
1	1	**Tampa Bay Lightning**	82	46	22	8	6	245	192	106
2	10	Atlanta Thrashers	82	33	37	8	4	214	243	78
3	11	Carolina Hurricanes	82	28	34	14	6	172	209	76
4	12	Florida Panthers	82	28	35	15	4	188	221	75
5	14	Washington Capitals	82	23	46	10	3	186	253	59

Note: CR = Conference rank; GP = Games played; W = Wins; L = Losses; T = Ties; OTL = Overtime loss; GF = Goals for; GA = Goals against; Pts = Points
Bolded teams qualified for the playoffs.

Eastern Conference
R		Div	GP	W	L	T	OTL	GF	GA	Pts
**1**	**Z-** Tampa Bay Lightning	**SE**	**82**	**46**	**22**	**8**	**6**	**245**	**192**	106
**2**	**Y-** Boston Bruins	**NE**	**82**	**41**	**19**	**15**	**7**	**209**	**188**	104
**3**	**Y-** Philadelphia Flyers	**AT**	**82**	**40**	**21**	**15**	**6**	**209**	**188**	101
**4**	**X-** Toronto Maple Leafs	**NE**	**82**	**45**	**24**	**10**	**3**	**242**	**204**	103
**5**	**X-** Ottawa Senators	**NE**	**82**	**43**	**23**	**10**	**6**	**262**	**189**	102
**6**	**X-** New Jersey Devils	**AT**	**82**	**43**	**25**	**12**	**2**	**213**	**164**	100
**7**	**X-** Montreal Canadiens	**NE**	**82**	**41**	**30**	**7**	**4**	**208**	**192**	93
**8**	**X-** New York Islanders	**AT**	**82**	**38**	**29**	**11**	**4**	**237**	**210**	91
8.5
9	Buffalo Sabres	NE	82	37	34	7	4	220	221	85
10	Atlanta Thrashers	SE	82	33	37	8	4	214	243	78
11	Carolina Hurricanes	SE	82	28	34	14	6	172	209	76
12	Florida Panthers	SE	82	28	35	15	4	188	221	75
13	New York Rangers	AT	82	27	40	7	8	206	250	69
14	Washington Capitals	SE	82	23	46	10	3	186	253	59
15	Pittsburgh Penguins	AT	82	23	47	8	4	190	303	58

Divisions: AT – Atlantic, NE – Northeast, SE – Southeast

Z – Clinched conference; Y – Clinched division; X – Clinched playoff spot

== Schedule and results ==
2003–04 regular season
October: 2–3–4–0 (home: 1–1–1–0; road: 1–2–3–0)

Game	Date	Score	Opponent	Record	Recap
1	October 9, 2003	1–3	@ Florida Panthers (2003–04)	0–1–0–0	L
2	October 11, 2003	1–2	New Jersey Devils (2003–04)	0–2–0–0	L
3	October 13, 2003	2–2 OT	Florida Panthers (2003–04)	0–2–1–0	T
4	October 18, 2003	2–2 OT	@ New York Rangers (2003–04)	0–2–2–0	T
5	October 22, 2003	1–1 OT	@ Pittsburgh Penguins (2003–04)	0–2–3–0	T
6	October 23, 2003	2–0	@ Boston Bruins (2003–04)	1–2–3–0	W
7	October 25, 2003	4–4 OT	@ Philadelphia Flyers (2003–04)	1–2–4–0	T
8	October 28, 2003	3–0	San Jose Sharks (2003–04)	2–2–4–0	W
9	October 30, 2003	1–4	@ New York Rangers (2003–04)	2–3–4–0	L

November: 5–7–3–0 (home: 4–2–3–0; road: 1–5–0–0)

Game	Date	Score	Opponent	Record	Recap
10	November 1, 2003	3–4	@ Tampa Bay Lightning (2003–04)	2–4–4–0	L
11	November 2, 2003	1–2	Toronto Maple Leafs (2003–04)	2–5–4–0	L
12	November 6, 2003	6–3	New York Rangers (2003–04)	3–5–4–0	W
13	November 8, 2003	3–2 OT	Los Angeles Kings (2003–04)	4–5–4–0	W
14	November 9, 2003	1–1 OT	Tampa Bay Lightning (2003–04)	4–5–5–0	T
15	November 12, 2003	1–7	@ Washington Capitals (2003–04)	4–6–5–0	L
16	November 13, 2003	5–1	Atlanta Thrashers (2003–04)	5–6–5–0	W
17	November 15, 2003	1–2	Washington Capitals (2003–04)	5–7–5–0	L
18	November 18, 2003	2–2 OT	Philadelphia Flyers (2003–04)	5–7–6–0	T
19	November 20, 2003	1–6	@ Ottawa Senators (2003–04)	5–8–6–0	L
20	November 21, 2003	0–5	@ Buffalo Sabres (2003–04)	5–9–6–0	L
21	November 23, 2003	0–0 OT	Tampa Bay Lightning (2003–04)	5–9–7–0	T
22	November 26, 2003	2–0	@ New York Islanders (2003–04)	6–9–7–0	W
23	November 28, 2003	2–4	@ Philadelphia Flyers (2003–04)	6–10–7–0	L
24	November 29, 2003	4–3	Pittsburgh Penguins (2003–04)	7–10–7–0	W

December: 5–5–1–2 (home: 3–2–1–1; road: 2–3–0–1)

Game	Date	Score	Opponent	Record	Recap
25	December 3, 2003	1–2 OT	Nashville Predators (2003–04)	7–10–7–1	OTL
26	December 5, 2003	1–1 OT	Montreal Canadiens (2003–04)	7–10–8–1	T
27	December 6, 2003	1–3	@ Montreal Canadiens (2003–04)	7–11–8–1	L
28	December 9, 2003	3–2	@ Edmonton Oilers (2003–04)	8–11–8–1	W
29	December 11, 2003	0–1	@ Calgary Flames (2003–04)	8–12–8–1	L
30	December 14, 2003	1–2 OT	@ Vancouver Canucks (2003–04)	8–12–8–2	OTL
31	December 18, 2003	2–1 OT	Pittsburgh Penguins (2003–04)	9–12–8–2	W
32	December 20, 2003	2–1	@ Boston Bruins (2003–04)	10–12–8–2	W
33	December 22, 2003	1–3	Dallas Stars (2003–04)	10–13–8–2	L
34	December 26, 2003	1–3	@ Buffalo Sabres (2003–04)	10–14–8–2	L
35	December 27, 2003	2–1 OT	Montreal Canadiens (2003–04)	11–14–8–2	W
36	December 29, 2003	2–1	Buffalo Sabres (2003–04)	12–14–8–2	W
37	December 31, 2003	1–3	Mighty Ducks of Anaheim (2003–04)	12–15–8–2	L

January: 5–9–2–0 (home: 2–7–1–0; road: 3–2–1–0)

Game	Date	Score	Opponent	Record	Recap
38	January 2, 2004	1–4	Detroit Red Wings (2003–04)	12–16–8–2	L
39	January 4, 2004	0–3	Phoenix Coyotes (2003–04)	12–17–8–2	L
40	January 6, 2004	2–0	St. Louis Blues (2003–04)	13–17–8–2	W
41	January 8, 2004	3–2	New York Rangers (2003–04)	14–17–8–2	W
42	January 9, 2004	1–4	@ Washington Capitals (2003–04)	14–18–8–2	L
43	January 11, 2004	2–2 OT	Ottawa Senators (2003–04)	14–18–9–2	T
44	January 15, 2004	4–5	@ Tampa Bay Lightning (2003–04)	14–19–9–2	L
45	January 16, 2004	4–3	@ Atlanta Thrashers (2003–04)	15–19–9–2	W
46	January 18, 2004	2–5	Atlanta Thrashers (2003–04)	15–20–9–2	L
47	January 20, 2004	1–3	Ottawa Senators (2003–04)	15–21–9–2	L
48	January 21, 2004	2–1	@ New Jersey Devils (2003–04)	16–21–9–2	W
49	January 23, 2004	2–3	New York Islanders (2003–04)	16–22–9–2	L
50	January 25, 2004	2–4	Buffalo Sabres (2003–04)	16–23–9–2	L
51	January 27, 2004	2–0	@ Toronto Maple Leafs (2003–04)	17–23–9–2	W
52	January 29, 2004	3–5	Washington Capitals (2003–04)	17–24–9–2	L
53	January 31, 2004	4–4 OT	@ Detroit Red Wings (2003–04)	17–24–10–2	T

February: 3–3–3–2 (home: 1–0–2–1; road: 2–3–1–1)

Game	Date	Score	Opponent	Record	Recap
54	February 3, 2004	1–3	@ Colorado Avalanche (2003–04)	17–25–10–2	L
55	February 4, 2004	2–3	@ Mighty Ducks of Anaheim (2003–04)	17–26–10–2	L
56	February 12, 2004	3–3 OT	Washington Capitals (2003–04)	17–26–11–2	T
57	February 14, 2004	1–4	@ New Jersey Devils (2003–04)	17–27–11–2	L
58	February 16, 2004	3–1	Florida Panthers (2003–04)	18–27–11–2	W
59	February 19, 2004	1–2 OT	Toronto Maple Leafs (2003–04)	18–27–11–3	OTL
60	February 21, 2004	3–3 OT	Boston Bruins (2003–04)	18–27–12–3	T
61	February 23, 2004	2–1	@ Toronto Maple Leafs (2003–04)	19–27–12–3	W
62	February 25, 2004	2–1	@ Washington Capitals (2003–04)	20–27–12–3	W
63	February 28, 2004	0–1 OT	@ Montreal Canadiens (2003–04)	20–27–12–4	OTL
64	February 29, 2004	3–3 OT	@ Minnesota Wild (2003–04)	20–27–13–4	T

March: 8–6–0–2 (home: 2–5–0–0; road: 6–1–0–2)

Game	Date	Score	Opponent	Record	Recap
65	March 2, 2004	0–3	Columbus Blue Jackets (2003–04)	20–28–13–4	L
66	March 5, 2004	3–2 OT	@ Atlanta Thrashers (2003–04)	21–28–13–4	W
67	March 6, 2004	1–4	New Jersey Devils (2003–04)	21–29–13–4	L
68	March 8, 2004	4–1	@ Columbus Blue Jackets (2003–04)	22–29–13–4	W
69	March 10, 2004	2–4	Tampa Bay Lightning (2003–04)	22–30–13–4	L
70	March 12, 2004	4–2	Atlanta Thrashers (2003–04)	23–30–13–4	W
71	March 13, 2004	5–1	@ Tampa Bay Lightning (2003–04)	24–30–13–4	W
72	March 15, 2004	0–1 OT	@ Atlanta Thrashers (2003–04)	24–30–13–5	OTL
73	March 17, 2004	3–2	@ Chicago Blackhawks (2003–04)	25–30–13–5	W
74	March 19, 2004	3–4 OT	@ Pittsburgh Penguins (2003–04)	25–30–13–6	OTL
75	March 20, 2004	3–2 OT	@ Ottawa Senators (2003–04)	26–30–13–6	W
76	March 23, 2004	2–4	Philadelphia Flyers (2003–04)	26–31–13–6	L
77	March 25, 2004	3–2	Florida Panthers (2003–04)	27–31–13–6	W
78	March 27, 2004	3–2	@ New York Islanders (2003–04)	28–31–13–6	W
79	March 29, 2004	1–3	@ Florida Panthers (2003–04)	28–32–13–6	L
80	March 30, 2004	2–3	Boston Bruins (2003–04)	28–33–13–6	L

April: 0–1–1–0 (home: 0–1–0–0; road: 0–0–1–0)

Game	Date	Score	Opponent	Record	Recap
81	April 2, 2004	4–6	New York Islanders (2003–04)	28–34–13–6	L
82	April 4, 2004	6–6 OT	@ Florida Panthers (2003–04)	28–34–14–6	T

Legend: W Win (2 points) L Loss (0 points) T Tie (1 point) OTL Overtime loss (1 point)

== Player statistics ==
=== Scoring ===
- Position abbreviations: C = Center; D = Defense; G = Goaltender; LW = Left wing; RW = Right wing
- † = Joined team via a transaction (e.g., trade, waivers, signing) during the season. Stats reflect time with the Hurricanes only.
- ‡ = Left team via a transaction (e.g., trade, waivers, release) during the season. Stats reflect time with the Hurricanes only.

No.	Player	Pos	Regular season					
No.	Player	Pos	GP	G	A	Pts	+/-	PIM
63	Josef Vasicek	LW	82	19	26	45	−3	60
26	Erik Cole	RW	80	18	24	42	−4	93
22	Sean Hill	D	80	13	26	39	−2	84
17	Rod Brind'Amour	C	78	12	26	38	0	28
92	Jeff O'Neill	RW	67	14	20	34	−12	60
12	Eric Staal	C	81	11	20	31	−6	40
10	Ron Francis‡	C	68	10	20	30	−12	14
19	Radim Vrbata	RW	80	12	13	25	−10	24
6	Bret Hedican	D	81	7	17	24	−10	64
14	Kevyn Adams	C	73	10	12	22	6	43
11	Justin Williams†	RW	32	5	13	18	2	32
27	Craig Adams	LW	80	7	10	17	−5	69
55	Danny Markov‡	D	44	4	10	14	−6	37
15	Marty Murray	C	66	5	7	12	6	8
7	Niclas Wallin	D	57	3	7	10	−8	51
23	Pavel Brendl	RW	18	5	3	8	0	8
4	Aaron Ward	D	49	3	5	8	1	37
36	Jesse Boulerice	RW	76	6	1	7	−5	127
16	Ryan Bayda	LW	44	3	3	6	−14	22
2	Glen Wesley	D	74	0	6	6	18	32
8	Bob Boughner‡	D	43	0	5	5	−9	80
62	Jaroslav Svoboda	LW	33	3	1	4	3	6
38	Allan Rourke	D	25	1	2	3	4	22
18	Michael Zigomanis	C	17	0	3	3	−1	2
25	Bruno St. Jacques	D	35	0	2	2	−7	31
47	Brad Fast	D	1	1	0	1	1	0
52	Damian Surma	LW	1	0	1	1	1	0
1	Arturs Irbe	G	10	0	0	0		2
37	Tomas Kurka	LW	3	0	0	0	0	0
56	Brett Lysak	C	2	0	0	0	0	2
71	Tomas Malec	D	2	0	0	0	−1	2
1	Jamie Storr	G	14	0	0	0		0
33	Joey Tetarenko	RW	2	0	0	0	0	0
80	Kevin Weekes	G	66	0	0	0		6

=== Goaltending ===
No.	Player	Regular season									
No.	Player	GP	W	L	T	SA	GA	GAA	SV%	SO	TOI
80	Kevin Weekes	66	23	30	5	1652	146	2.33	.912	6	3765
1	Arturs Irbe	10	5	2	0	228	23	2.45	.899	0	564
1	Jamie Storr	14	0	8	1	262	32	2.91	.878	0	660

== Awards and records ==
=== Awards ===
Type	Award/honor	Recipient	Ref
League (in-season)	NHL YoungStars Game selection	Eric Staal	
Team	Good Guy Award	Kevyn Adams	
Team	Most Valuable Player	Sean Hill	
Team	Steve Chiasson Award	Sean Hill	

=== Milestones ===
Milestone	Player	Date	Ref
First game	Eric Staal	October 9, 2003	
First game	Allan Rourke	October 28, 2003	
First game	Brett Lysak	March 19, 2004	
First game	Brad Fast	April 4, 2004	

== Transactions ==
The Hurricanes were involved in the following transactions from June 10, 2003, the day after the deciding game of the 2003 Stanley Cup Finals, through June 7, 2004, the day of the deciding game of the 2004 Stanley Cup Finals.

=== Trades ===
Date	Details		Ref
June 21, 2003	To Phoenix Coyotes: Igor Knyazev; David Tanabe	To Carolina Hurricanes: Danny Markov; Conditional 4th-round pick in 2004 (Note: Carolina would receive either a “third- or fourth-round draft pick in 2004 or 2005 from Phoenix.”)	
June 22, 2003	To Philadelphia Flyers: 6th-round pick in 2004	To Carolina Hurricanes: Marty Murray	
June 22, 2003	To Columbus Blue Jackets: 4th-round pick in 2004	To Carolina Hurricanes: 5th-round pick in 2003; 6th-round pick in 2003	
July 16, 2003	To Calgary Flames: Columbus’ 4th-round pick in 2004; Conditional 5th-round pick in 2005 (Note: Calgary would receive this pick if Carolina re-signed Boughner following the 2003–04 season or if he re-signed with a team Carolina subsequently traded him to. Carolina traded him to Colorado on February 20, 2004, and Boughner re-signed with them on July 1, 2004.)	To Carolina Hurricanes: Bob Boughner	
October 3, 2003	To Atlanta Thrashers: Jani Hurme	To Carolina Hurricanes: 4th-round pick in 2004	
January 20, 2004	To Philadelphia Flyers: Danny Markov	To Carolina Hurricanes: Justin Williams	
February 20, 2004	To Colorado Avalanche: Bob Boughner	To Carolina Hurricanes: Rights to Chris Bahen; Washington’s 3rd-round pick in 2004	
March 9, 2004	To Toronto Maple Leafs: Ron Francis	To Carolina Hurricanes: 4th-round pick in 2005	

=== Players acquired ===
Date	Player	Former team	Term	Via	Ref
July 2, 2003	Joey Tetarenko	Ottawa Senators	1-year	Free agency	
July 8, 2003	Glen Wesley	Toronto Maple Leafs	1-year	Free agency	
August 6, 2003	Chad LaRose	Plymouth Whalers (OHL)	3-year	Free agency	
October 3, 2003	Jani Hurme	Florida Panthers		Waiver draft	
October 3, 2003	Jamie Storr	Los Angeles Kings	1-year	Free agency	

=== Players lost ===
Date	Player	New team	Via (Note: In parentheses is the player's free agency group on July 1 if applicable.)	Ref
July 1, 2003	Steven Halko (Note: Halko retired.)		Contract expiration (UFA)	
July 3, 2003	Mike Watt	SKA Saint Petersburg (RSL)	Free agency (UFA)	
July 21, 2003	Nikos Tselios	Phoenix Coyotes	Free agency (UFA)	
July 30, 2003	Ryan Murphy	New Jersey Devils	Free agency (UFA)	
August 14, 2003	Craig MacDonald	Florida Panthers	Free agency (VI)	
August 28, 2003	Jan Hlavac	New York Rangers	Free agency (UFA)	
September 13, 2003	Kaspars Astasenko	HK Riga 2000 (LHL)	Free agency (VI)	
September 30, 2003	Jeff Heerema	New York Rangers	Waivers	
October 2, 2003	Brent McDonald	Lowell Lock Monsters (AHL)	Free agency (UFA)	
October 22, 2003	Shaun Fisher	Texas Wildcatters (ECHL)	Free agency (UFA)	
November 17, 2003	Jeff Daniels		Retirement	

=== Signings ===
Date	Player	Term	Contract type	Ref
July 10, 2003	Bruno St. Jacques	1-year	Re-signing	
July 14, 2003	Allan Rourke	1-year	Re-signing	
July 15, 2003	Jeff Heerema	1-year	Re-signing	
August 11, 2003	Jaroslav Svoboda	1-year	Re-signing	
August 12, 2003	Danny Markov	3-year	Re-signing	
August 13, 2003	Erik Cole	1-year	Re-signing	
September 3, 2003	Josef Vasicek	1-year	Re-signing	
October 6, 2003	Eric Staal	3-year	Entry-level	
May 13, 2004	Cam Ward	multi-year	Entry-level	

== Draft picks ==
Carolina's draft picks at the 2003 NHL entry draft held at the Gaylord Entertainment Center in Nashville, Tennessee.

Round	#	Player	Position	Nationality	College/Junior/Club team (League)
1	2	Eric Staal	C	Canada	Peterborough Petes (OHL)
2	31	Danny Richmond	RW	United States	University of Michigan (NCAA)
4	102	Aaron Dawson	D	United States	Peterborough Petes (OHL)
4	126	Kevin Nastiuk	G	Canada	Medicine Hat Tigers (OHL)
4	130	Matej Trojovsky	D	Czech Republic	Regina Pats (WHL)
5	137	Tyson Strachan	D	Canada	Vernon Vipers (BCHL)
7	198	Shay Stephenson	LW	Canada	Red Deer Rebels (WHL)
8	230	Jamie Hoffmann	C	United States	Des Moines Buccaneers (USHL)
9	262	Ryan Rorabeck	C	Canada	Toronto St. Michael's Majors (OHL)

== Farm teams ==
=== American Hockey League ===
The Lowell Lock Monsters are the Hurricanes American Hockey League affiliate for the 2003–04 AHL season.

=== ECHL ===
The Florida Everblades are the Hurricanes ECHL affiliate.
