= 2003–04 San Jose Sharks season =

National Hockey League team season

2003–04 San Jose Sharks
- Pacific Division champions
- Division: 1st Pacific
- Conference: 2nd Western
- 2003–04 record: 43–21–12–6
- Home record: 24–8–7–2
- Road record: 19–13–5–4
- Goals for: 219
- Goals against: 183

Team information
- General manager: Doug Wilson
- Coach: Ron Wilson
- Captain: Mike Ricci (first 10 games); Vincent Damphousse (next 20 games); Alyn McCauley (next 10 games); Patrick Marleau (last 42 games)
- Alternate captains: Vincent Damphousse (first 10 games, last 52 games); Alyn McCauley (first 30 games, last 42 games); Mike Ricci (last 72 games)
- Arena: HP Pavilion at San Jose
- Average attendance: 15,836
- Minor league affiliates: Cleveland Barons; Fresno Falcons; Johnstown Chiefs

Team leaders
- Goals: Patrick Marleau (28)
- Assists: Nils Ekman (33)
- Points: Patrick Marleau (57)
- Penalty minutes: Scott Parker (101)
- Plus/minus: Nils Ekman (+30)
- Wins: Evgeni Nabokov (31)
- Goals against average: Vesa Toskala (2.06)

The 2003–04 San Jose Sharks season was the franchise's 13th in the NHL. The Sharks made it to the Western Conference Finals for the first time before losing to the Calgary Flames. It was the last season before the 2004–05 lockout, which cancelled the following season.

== Off-season ==
On May 13, 2003, the Sharks hired Doug Wilson (no relation to coach Ron Wilson) as general manager, replacing Dean Lombardi. At the entry draft in June, the Sharks chose Milan Michalek with their first-round pick, sixth overall.

== Regular season ==
The Sharks rotated team captaincy every ten games for the first half of the season before permanently handing the role to forward Patrick Marleau.

=== Final standings ===
Pacific Division
No.	CR		GP	W	L	T	OTL	GF	GA	Pts
1	2	**San Jose Sharks**	82	43	21	12	6	219	183	104
2	5	**Dallas Stars**	82	41	26	13	2	194	175	97
3	11	Los Angeles Kings	82	28	29	16	9	205	217	81
4	12	Mighty Ducks of Anaheim	82	29	35	10	8	184	213	76
5	13	Phoenix Coyotes	82	22	36	18	6	188	245	68

Note: CR = Conference rank; GP = Games played; W = Wins; L = Losses; T = Ties; OTL = Overtime loss; GF = Goals for; GA = Goals against; Pts = Points
Bolded teams qualified for the playoffs.

Western Conference
R		Div	GP	W	L	T	OTL	GF	GA	Pts
**1**	**P-** Detroit Red Wings	**CE**	**82**	**48**	**21**	**11**	**2**	**255**	**189**	109
**2**	**Y-** San Jose Sharks	**PA**	**82**	**43**	**21**	**12**	**6**	**255**	**183**	104
**3**	**Y-** Vancouver Canucks	**NW**	**82**	**43**	**24**	**10**	**5**	**235**	**194**	101
**4**	**X-** Colorado Avalanche	**NW**	**82**	**40**	**22**	**13**	**7**	**236**	**198**	100
**5**	**X-** Dallas Stars	**PA**	**82**	**41**	**26**	**13**	**2**	**194**	**175**	97
**6**	**X-** Calgary Flames	**NW**	**82**	**42**	**30**	**7**	**3**	**200**	**176**	94
**7**	**X-** St. Louis Blues	**CE**	**82**	**39**	**30**	**11**	**2**	**191**	**198**	91
**8**	**X-** Nashville Predators	**CE**	**82**	**38**	**29**	**11**	**4**	**216**	**217**	91
8.5
9	Edmonton Oilers	NW	82	36	29	12	5	221	208	89
10	Minnesota Wild	NW	82	30	29	20	3	188	183	83
11	Los Angeles Kings	PA	82	28	29	16	9	205	217	81
12	Mighty Ducks of Anaheim	PA	82	29	35	10	8	184	213	76
13	Phoenix Coyotes	PA	82	22	36	18	6	188	245	68
14	Columbus Blue Jackets	CE	82	25	45	8	4	177	238	62
15	Chicago Blackhawks	CE	82	20	43	11	8	188	259	59

Divisions: CE – Central, PA – Pacific, NW – Northwest

P – Clinched Presidents Trophy; Y – Clinched division; X – Clinched playoff spot

== Schedule and results ==
=== Regular season ===
2003–04 regular season
October: 1–5–4–0 (home: 0–2–3–0; road: 1–3–1–0)

Game	Date	Score	Opponent	Record	Recap
1	October 9, 2003	2–5	@ Edmonton Oilers (2003–04)	0–1–0–0	L
2	October 11, 2003	2–3	@ Calgary Flames (2003–04)	0–2–0–0	L
3	October 12, 2003	3–2	@ Minnesota Wild (2003–04)	1–2–0–0	W
4	October 16, 2003	0–0 OT	Philadelphia Flyers (2003–04)	1–2–1–0	T
5	October 18, 2003	1–4	Ottawa Senators (2003–04)	1–3–1–0	L
6	October 21, 2003	0–2	Mighty Ducks of Anaheim (2003–04)	1–4–1–0	L
7	October 23, 2003	3–3 OT	Chicago Blackhawks (2003–04)	1–4–2–0	T
8	October 25, 2003	4–4 OT	Phoenix Coyotes (2003–04)	1–4–3–0	T
9	October 28, 2003	0–3	@ Carolina Hurricanes (2003–04)	1–5–3–0	L
10	October 30, 2003	2–2 OT	@ Tampa Bay Lightning (2003–04)	1–5–4–0	T

November: 7–1–4–2 (home: 2–1–2–1; road: 5–0–2–1)

Game	Date	Score	Opponent	Record	Recap
11	November 1, 2003	6–2	@ Florida Panthers (2003–04)	2–5–4–0	W
12	November 2, 2003	2–2 OT	@ Atlanta Thrashers (2003–04)	2–5–5–0	T
13	November 5, 2003	2–3 OT	@ New Jersey Devils (2003–04)	2–5–5–1	OTL
14	November 6, 2003	5–5 OT	@ Boston Bruins (2003–04)	2–5–6–1	T
15	November 8, 2003	3–2	@ Washington Capitals (2003–04)	3–5–6–1	W
16	November 11, 2003	3–4	Colorado Avalanche (2003–04)	3–6–6–1	L
17	November 13, 2003	3–4 OT	St. Louis Blues (2003–04)	3–6–6–2	OTL
18	November 15, 2003	2–2 OT	Toronto Maple Leafs (2003–04)	3–6–7–2	T
19	November 18, 2003	2–2 OT	New York Rangers (2003–04)	3–6–8–2	T
20	November 21, 2003	5–0	@ Phoenix Coyotes (2003–04)	4–6–8–2	W
21	November 22, 2003	3–1	Nashville Predators (2003–04)	5–6–8–2	W
22	November 26, 2003	3–2	Chicago Blackhawks (2003–04)	6–6–8–2	W
23	November 28, 2003	2–1	@ Minnesota Wild (2003–04)	7–6–8–2	W
24	November 30, 2003	2–1	@ Edmonton Oilers (2003–04)	8–6–8–2	W

December: 7–3–3–1 (home: 5–0–2–0; road: 2–3–1–1)

Game	Date	Score	Opponent	Record	Recap
25	December 2, 2003	1–3	@ Calgary Flames (2003–04)	8–7–8–2	L
26	December 4, 2003	2–2 OT	Colorado Avalanche (2003–04)	8–7–9–2	T
27	December 6, 2003	2–1	Dallas Stars (2003–04)	9–7–9–2	W
28	December 10, 2003	2–3	@ Mighty Ducks of Anaheim (2003–04)	9–8–9–2	L
29	December 11, 2003	2–2 OT	Edmonton Oilers (2003–04)	9–8–10–2	T
30	December 13, 2003	2–0	Mighty Ducks of Anaheim (2003–04)	10–8–10–2	W
31	December 17, 2003	2–3 OT	@ Detroit Red Wings (2003–04)	10–8–10–3	OTL
32	December 18, 2003	2–4	@ St. Louis Blues (2003–04)	10–9–10–3	L
33	December 21, 2003	2–1	@ Mighty Ducks of Anaheim (2003–04)	11–9–10–3	W
34	December 22, 2003	2–1	Mighty Ducks of Anaheim (2003–04)	12–9–10–3	W
35	December 26, 2003	5–0	Los Angeles Kings (2003–04)	13–9–10–3	W
36	December 27, 2003	4–4 OT	@ Los Angeles Kings (2003–04)	13–9–11–3	T
37	December 29, 2003	5–2	Nashville Predators (2003–04)	14–9–11–3	W
38	December 31, 2003	1–0	@ Columbus Blue Jackets (2003–04)	15–9–11–3	W

January: 9–4–0–2 (home: 5–2–0–1; road: 4–2–0–1)

Game	Date	Score	Opponent	Record	Recap
39	January 2, 2004	1–2	@ Chicago Blackhawks (2003–04)	15–10–11–3	L
40	January 3, 2004	3–1	@ St. Louis Blues (2003–04)	16–10–11–3	W
41	January 5, 2004	2–1	@ Vancouver Canucks (2003–04)	17–10–11–3	W
42	January 8, 2004	2–3 OT	Columbus Blue Jackets (2003–04)	17–10–11–4	OTL
43	January 10, 2004	5–2	Atlanta Thrashers (2003–04)	18–10–11–4	W
44	January 13, 2004	0–3	Dallas Stars (2003–04)	18–11–11–4	L
45	January 15, 2004	3–1	Vancouver Canucks (2003–04)	19–11–11–4	W
46	January 17, 2004	2–1	@ Colorado Avalanche (2003–04)	20–11–11–4	W
47	January 19, 2004	2–1	Detroit Red Wings (2003–04)	21–11–11–4	W
48	January 21, 2004	4–2	@ Phoenix Coyotes (2003–04)	22–11–11–4	W
49	January 22, 2004	1–2	Phoenix Coyotes (2003–04)	22–12–11–4	L
50	January 24, 2004	4–0	Minnesota Wild (2003–04)	23–12–11–4	W
51	January 28, 2004	4–1	Calgary Flames (2003–04)	24–12–11–4	W
52	January 30, 2004	1–3	@ Dallas Stars (2003–04)	24–13–11–4	L
53	January 31, 2004	2–3 OT	@ Nashville Predators (2003–04)	24–13–11–5	OTL

February: 8–3–0–1 (home: 5–0–0–0; road: 3–3–0–1)

Game	Date	Score	Opponent	Record	Recap
54	February 3, 2004	3–0	Florida Panthers (2003–04)	25–13–11–5	W
55	February 5, 2004	5–0	Phoenix Coyotes (2003–04)	26–13–11–5	W
56	February 10, 2004	1–2	@ Buffalo Sabres (2003–04)	26–14–11–5	L
57	February 11, 2004	2–4	@ Detroit Red Wings (2003–04)	26–15–11–5	L
58	February 14, 2004	2–1 OT	@ Columbus Blue Jackets (2003–04)	27–15–11–5	W
59	February 16, 2004	5–2	@ Philadelphia Flyers (2003–04)	28–15–11–5	W
60	February 18, 2004	3–7	@ Nashville Predators (2003–04)	28–16–11–5	L
61	February 19, 2004	6–3	@ Chicago Blackhawks (2003–04)	29–16–11–5	W
62	February 23, 2004	4–2	Columbus Blue Jackets (2003–04)	30–16–11–5	W
63	February 26, 2004	2–3 OT	@ Vancouver Canucks (2003–04)	30–16–11–6	OTL
64	February 27, 2004	4–2	Pittsburgh Penguins (2003–04)	31–16–11–6	W
65	February 29, 2004	1–0	St. Louis Blues (2003–04)	32–16–11–6	W

March: 10–4–1–0 (home: 6–2–0–0; road: 4–2–1–0)

Game	Date	Score	Opponent	Record	Recap
66	March 3, 2004	4–3	Montreal Canadiens (2003–04)	33–16–11–6	W
67	March 5, 2004	1–5	@ Colorado Avalanche (2003–04)	33–17–11–6	L
68	March 7, 2004	0–4	@ Dallas Stars (2003–04)	33–18–11–6	L
69	March 9, 2004	3–4	Minnesota Wild (2003–04)	33–19–11–6	L
70	March 11, 2004	5–4	New York Islanders (2003–04)	34–19–11–6	W
71	March 13, 2004	3–1	Los Angeles Kings (2003–04)	35–19–11–6	W
72	March 16, 2004	3–3 OT	@ Dallas Stars (2003–04)	35–19–12–6	T
73	March 18, 2004	5–3	@ Los Angeles Kings (2003–04)	36–19–12–6	W
74	March 19, 2004	4–2	@ Mighty Ducks of Anaheim (2003–04)	37–19–12–6	W
75	March 21, 2004	2–5	Edmonton Oilers (2003–04)	37–20–12–6	L
76	March 23, 2004	5–2	Detroit Red Wings (2003–04)	38–20–12–6	W
77	March 25, 2004	3–2	Calgary Flames (2003–04)	39–20–12–6	W
78	March 26, 2004	3–0	@ Phoenix Coyotes (2003–04)	40–20–12–6	W
79	March 28, 2004	2–1 OT	Dallas Stars (2003–04)	41–20–12–6	W
80	March 31, 2004	3–0	@ Los Angeles Kings (2003–04)	42–20–12–6	W

April: 1–1–0–0 (home: 1–1–0–0; road: 0–0–0–0)

Game	Date	Score	Opponent	Record	Recap
81	April 2, 2004	1–4	Vancouver Canucks (2003–04)	42–21–12–6	L
82	April 4, 2004	4–3 OT	Los Angeles Kings (2003–04)	43–21–12–6	W

Legend: W Win (2 points) L Loss (0 points) T Tie (1 point) OTL Overtime loss (1 point)

=== Playoffs ===
2004 Stanley Cup playoffs
Western Conference Quarterfinals vs. (7) St. Louis Blues – Sharks win 4–1

Game	Date	Visitor	Score	Home	OT	Decision	Attendance	Series	Recap
1	April 8	St. Louis	0–1	San Jose	OT	Nabokov	17,496	Sharks lead 1–0	W
2	April 10	St. Louis	1–3	San Jose		Nabokov	17,496	Sharks lead 2–0	W
3	April 12	San Jose	1–4	St. Louis		Nabokov	19,023	Sharks lead 2–1	L
4	April 13	San Jose	4–3	St. Louis		Nabokov	19,452	Sharks lead 3–1	W
5	April 15	St. Louis	1–3	San Jose		Nabokov	17,496	Sharks win 4–1	W

Western Conference Semifinals vs. (4) Colorado Avalanche – Sharks win 4–2

Game	Date	Visitor	Score	Home	OT	Decision	Attendance	Series	Recap
1	April 22	Colorado	2–5	San Jose		Nabokov	17,496	Sharks lead 1–0	W
2	April 24	Colorado	1–4	San Jose		Nabokov	17,496	Sharks lead 2–0	W
3	April 26	San Jose	1–0	Colorado		Nabokov	18,007	Sharks lead 3–0	W
4	April 28	San Jose	0–1	Colorado	OT	Nabokov	18,007	Sharks lead 3–1	L
5	May 1	Colorado	2–1	San Jose	OT	Nabokov	17,496	Sharks lead 3–2	L
6	May 4	San Jose	3–1	Colorado		Nabokov	18,007	Sharks win 4–2	W

Western Conference Finals vs. (6) Calgary Flames – Flames win 4–2

Game	Date	Visitor	Score	Home	OT	Decision	Attendance	Series	Recap
1	May 9	Calgary	4–3	San Jose	OT	Nabokov	17,496	Flames lead 1–0	L
2	May 11	Calgary	4–1	San Jose		Nabokov	17,496	Flames lead 2–0	L
3	May 13	San Jose	3–0	Calgary		Nabokov	19,289	Flames lead 2–1	W
4	May 16	San Jose	4–2	Calgary		Nabokov	19,289	Series tied 2–2	W
5	May 17	Calgary	3–0	San Jose		Nabokov	17,496	Flames lead 3–2	L
6	May 19	San Jose	1–3	Calgary		Nabokov	19,289	Flames win 4–2	L

Legend: W Win L Loss

== Player statistics ==
=== Scoring ===
- Position abbreviations: C = Center; D = Defense; G = Goaltender; LW = Left wing; RW = Right wing
- † = Joined team via a transaction (e.g., trade, waivers, signing) during the season. Stats reflect time with the Sharks only.
- ‡ = Left team via a transaction (e.g., trade, waivers, release) during the season. Stats reflect time with the Sharks only.

No.	Player	Pos	Regular season						Playoffs					
No.	Player	Pos	GP	G	A	Pts	+/-	PIM	GP	G	A	Pts	+/-	PIM
12	Patrick Marleau	C	80	28	29	57	−5	24	17	8	4	12	0	6
28	Nils Ekman	LW	82	22	33	55	30	34	16	0	3	3	−2	8
14	Jonathan Cheechoo	RW	81	28	19	47	5	33	17	4	6	10	4	10
10	Alyn McCauley	C	82	20	27	47	23	28	11	2	1	3	0	2
19	Marco Sturm	LW	64	21	20	41	0	36	—	—	—	—	—	—
25	Vincent Damphousse	C	82	12	29	41	−5	66	17	7	7	14	0	20
7	Brad Stuart	D	77	9	30	39	9	34	17	1	5	6	−4	13
94	Alexander Korolyuk	LW	63	19	18	37	20	18	17	5	2	7	0	10
15	Wayne Primeau	C	72	9	20	29	4	90	17	1	2	3	−7	4
17	Scott Thornton	LW	80	13	14	27	−6	84	12	2	2	4	1	22
18	Mike Ricci	C	71	7	19	26	8	40	17	2	3	5	5	4
23	Niko Dimitrakos	RW	68	9	15	24	6	49	15	1	8	9	2	8
4	Kyle McLaren	D	64	2	22	24	10	60	16	0	3	3	−1	10
22	Scott Hannan	D	82	6	15	21	10	48	17	1	5	6	7	22
42	Tom Preissing	D	69	2	17	19	8	12	11	0	1	1	0	0
2	Mike Rathje	D	80	2	17	19	18	46	17	1	5	6	1	13
44	Christian Ehrhoff	D	41	1	11	12	4	14	—	—	—	—	—	—
13	Todd Harvey	C	47	4	5	9	3	38	16	1	2	3	−3	2
37	Curtis Brown†	C	12	2	2	4	1	6	17	0	2	2	−5	18
27	Scott Parker	RW	50	1	3	4	0	101	—	—	—	—	—	—
16	Mark Smith	C	36	1	3	4	−5	72	10	1	0	1	2	11
5	Rob Davison	D	55	0	3	3	−3	92	5	0	2	2	0	4
21	Jim Fahey	D	15	0	2	2	−2	18	2	0	0	0	0	0
6	Jason Marshall†	D	12	0	2	2	−2	8	17	0	1	1	1	25
9	Milan Michalek	RW	2	1	0	1	1	4	—	—	—	—	—	—
35	Vesa Toskala	G	28	0	1	1		2	—	—	—	—	—	—
24	Brad Boyes‡	C	1	0	0	0	−2	2	—	—	—	—	—	—
26	Lynn Loyns‡	LW	2	0	0	0	−1	0	—	—	—	—	—	—
20	Evgeni Nabokov	G	59	0	0	0		14	17	0	0	0		4
34	Patrick Rissmiller	LW	4	0	0	0	0	0	—	—	—	—	—	—
32	Miroslav Zalesak	RW	2	0	0	0	−1	0	—	—	—	—	—	—
57	Marcel Goc	C	—	—	—	—	—	—	5	1	1	2	1	0

=== Goaltending ===
No.	Player	Regular season										Playoffs								
No.	Player	GP	W	L	T	SA	GA	GAA	SV%	SO	TOI	GP	W	L	SA	GA	GAA	SV%	SO	TOI
20	Evgeni Nabokov	59	31	19	8	1610	127	2.20	.921	9	3456	17	10	7	461	30	1.71	.935	3	1052
35	Vesa Toskala	28	12	8	4	760	53	2.06	.930	1	1541	—	—	—	—	—	—	—	—	—

== Awards and records ==
=== Awards ===
Type	Award/honor	Recipient	Ref
League (in-season)	NHL All-Star Game selection	Patrick Marleau	
League (in-season)	NHL Defensive Player of the Month	Evgeni Nabokov (February)	
League (in-season)	NHL Defensive Player of the Week	Evgeni Nabokov (March 29)	
League (in-season)	NHL YoungStars Game selection	Jonathan Cheechoo	
League (in-season)	NHL YoungStars Game selection	Christian Ehrhoff	
Team	Sharks Player of the Year	Patrick Marleau	
Team	Sharks Rookie of the Year	Tom Preissing	
Team	Three Stars of the Year	Patrick Marleau	

=== Milestones ===
Milestone	Player	Date	Ref
First game	Christian Ehrhoff	October 9, 2003	
First game	Milan Michalek	October 9, 2003	
First game	Tom Preissing	October 11, 2003	
First game	Patrick Rissmiller	November 13, 2003	
First game	Brad Boyes	March 7, 2004	
First game	Marcel Goc	April 15, 2004	
1,000th game played	Mike Ricci	February 11, 2004	
25th shutout	Evgeni Nabokov	February 29, 2004	

== Transactions ==
The Sharks were involved in the following transactions from June 10, 2003, the day after the deciding game of the 2003 Stanley Cup Finals, through June 7, 2004, the day of the deciding game of the 2004 Stanley Cup Finals.

=== Trades ===
Date	Details		Ref
June 21, 2003	To Colorado Avalanche: 5th-round pick in 2005	To San Jose Sharks: Scott Parker	
June 21, 2003	To Boston Bruins: 1st-round pick in 2003; 2nd-round pick in 2003; 4th-round pick in 2003	To San Jose Sharks: 1st-round pick in 2003	
June 21, 2003	To New York Rangers: 2nd-round pick in 2003; 3rd-round pick in 2003	To San Jose Sharks: 2nd-round pick in 2003	
June 21, 2003	To Calgary Flames: 3rd-round pick in 2003; 5th-round pick in 2003; 6th-round pick in 2003	To San Jose Sharks: 2nd-round pick in 2003	
June 22, 2003	To Philadelphia Flyers: 6th-round pick in 2004	To San Jose Sharks: 7th-round pick in 2003	
June 22, 2003	To Chicago Blackhawks: 8th-round pick in 2004	To San Jose Sharks: 9th-round pick in 2003	
June 30, 2003	To New York Rangers: 4th-round pick in 2004	To San Jose Sharks: Rights to Mark Messier	
August 12, 2003	To New York Rangers: Chad Wiseman	To San Jose Sharks: Nils Ekman	
November 16, 2003	To Calgary Flames: Miikka Kiprusoff	To San Jose Sharks: Conditional 2nd-round pick in 2005	
January 9, 2004	To Calgary Flames: Lynn Loyns	To San Jose Sharks: Future considerations (Note: 5th-round pick in 2004)	
March 3, 2004	To Minnesota Wild: 5th-round pick in 2004	To San Jose Sharks: Jason Marshall	
March 9, 2004	To Boston Bruins: Brad Boyes	To San Jose Sharks: Jeff Jillson	
March 9, 2004	To Buffalo Sabres: Jeff Jillson	To San Jose Sharks: Curtis Brown; Andy Delmore	
March 9, 2004	To Boston Bruins: Andy Delmore	To San Jose Sharks: Future considerations	

=== Players acquired ===
Date	Player	Former team	Term	Via	Ref
June 30, 2003	Yuri Moscevsky	Cleveland Barons (AHL)		Free agency	
June 30, 2003	Patrick Rissmiller	Cleveland Barons (AHL)		Free agency	

=== Players lost ===
Date	Player	New team	Via (Note: In parentheses is the player's free agency group on July 1 if applicable.)	Ref
July 1, 2003	Marc Kielkucki (Note: Kielkucki retired.)		Contract expiration (UFA)	
July 1, 2003	Scott Thomas (Note: Thomas retired.)		Contract expiration (VI)	
July 3, 2003	Teemu Selanne	Colorado Avalanche	Free agency (III)	
July 8, 2003	Ryan Kraft	New York Islanders	Free agency (VI)	
August 21, 2003	John Jakopin	New York Rangers	Free agency (UFA)	
August 21, 2003	Jeff Nelson	Muskegon Fury (UHL)	Free agency (VI)	
September 6, 2003	Mark Messier	New York Rangers	Free agency (III)	
N/A	Eric Laplante	Long Beach Ice Dogs (ECHL)	Free agency (UFA)	
October 17, 2003	Graig Mischler	Reading Royals (ECHL)	Free agency (UFA)	
April 3, 2004	Adam Graves		Retirement (III)	

=== Signings ===
Date	Player	Term	Contract type	Ref
June 21, 2003	Alexander Korolyuk	2-year	Re-signing	
June 22, 2003	Christian Ehrhoff		Entry-level	
June 22, 2003	Dimitri Patzold		Entry-level	
July 8, 2003	Tavis Hansen		Re-signing	
July 11, 2003	Rob Davison		Re-signing	
July 11, 2003	Marcel Goc		Entry-level	
July 11, 2003	Patrick Marleau	2-year	Re-signing	
July 15, 2003	Miikka Kiprusoff	1-year	Re-signing	
July 15, 2003	Alyn McCauley	3-year	Re-signing	
July 15, 2003	Mark Smith		Re-signing	
July 15, 2003	Marco Sturm		Re-signing	
July 15, 2003	Miroslav Zalesak	1-year	Re-signing	
July 25, 2003	Jonathan Cheechoo		Re-signing	
August 12, 2003	Jesse Fibiger	1-year	Re-signing	
August 12, 2003	Robert Mulick	1-year	Re-signing	
August 18, 2003	Milan Michalek		Entry-level	
August 19, 2003	Nolan Schaefer		Entry-level	
August 27, 2003	Scott Hannan	1-year	Re-signing	
August 28, 2003	Jon DiSalvatore		Entry-level	
November 13, 2003	Scott Thornton	2-year	Extension	
December 9, 2003	Garrett Stafford		Entry-level	

== Draft picks ==
San Jose's draft picks at the 2003 NHL entry draft held at the Gaylord Entertainment Center in Nashville, Tennessee.

Round	#	Player	Position	Nationality	College/Junior/Club team
1	6	Milan Michalek	Left wing	Czech Republic	HC České Budějovice (Czech Republic)
1	16	Steve Bernier	Right wing	Canada	Moncton Wildcats (QMJHL)
2	43	Josh Hennessy	Center	United States	Quebec Remparts (QMJHL)
2	47	Matt Carle	Defense	United States	River City Lancers (USHL)
5	139	Patrick Ehelechner	Goaltender	Germany	Hannover Scorpions (DEL)
7	201	Jonathan Tremblay	Right wing	Canada	Acadie-Bathurst Titan (QMJHL)
7	205	Joe Pavelski	Center	United States	Waterloo Black Hawks (USHL)
7	216	Kai Hospelt	Forward	Germany	Kölner Haie (DEL)
8	236	Alexander Hult	Center	Sweden	Oskarshamn IK (Swe-1)
9	267	Brian O'Hanley	Defense	United States	Boston College High School (USHS-MA)
9	276	Carter Lee	Forward	United States	Canterbury School (USHS-CT)
