= 2003–04 Mighty Ducks of Anaheim season =

NHL team season

2003–04 Mighty Ducks of Anaheim
- Division: 4th Pacific
- Conference: 12th Western
- 2003–04 record: 29–35–10–8
- Home record: 19–11–7–4
- Road record: 10–24–3–4
- Goals for: 184
- Goals against: 213

Team information
- General manager: Bryan Murray
- Coach: Mike Babcock
- Captain: Steve Rucchin
- Alternate captains: Keith Carney; Sergei Fedorov
- Arena: Arrowhead Pond of Anaheim
- Average attendance: 14,988 (87.3%); Total: 614,504
- Minor league affiliate: Cincinnati Mighty Ducks

Team leaders
- Goals: Sergei Fedorov (31)
- Assists: Vaclav Prospal (35)
- Points: Sergei Fedorov (65)
- Penalty minutes: Garrett Burnett (184)
- Plus/minus: Martin Skoula (+3)
- Wins: Jean-Sebastien Giguere (17)
- Goals against average: Martin Gerber (2.26)

The 2003–04 Mighty Ducks of Anaheim season was the team's 11th season in the National Hockey League (NHL). After making it to the 2003 Stanley Cup Finals and losing in the seventh game, the team placed fourth in the Pacific Division and 12th in the Western Conference, thereby failing to qualify for the 2004 Stanley Cup playoffs.

== Offseason ==
In the 2003 NHL entry draft, the Ducks selected Ryan Getzlaf with their first first-round pick, 19th overall, and Corey Perry with their second first-round pick, 28th overall.

Forward Steve Rucchin was named team captain following Paul Kariya's departure to the Colorado Avalanche via free agency.

== Regular season ==
The departure of franchise player Paul Kariya marked another new era which had many fans angered as well as worried about future of the teams' on-ice success. Signing Sergei Fedorov and Vaclav Prospal in the summer relieved most of the fans' fear. Both players delivered as expected but scoring decreased for several reasons: Mike Leclerc played only 10 games, Rob Niedermayer played only 55 games. Andy McDonald stayed healthy but had trouble repeating his performance after missing half of last season due to a concussion; Chistov suffered from "sophomore jinx" collecting only 2 goals. Rookie Joffrey Lupul had a wonderful rookie campaign with a bright future ahead. Overall, while the team had more potential scoring depth, but several players did not perform as expected.

The defense performed well enough but J. S. Giguere failed at times to play the way he did the year before allowing soft goals. Later that season backup goalie Martin Gerber saw more ice time challenging Giguere for the number one spot and nearly outperforming him.

Playing away from home did not do them well as the Mighty Ducks won 19 games at home but only 10 games on the road.

=== Final standings ===
Pacific Division
No.	CR		GP	W	L	T	OTL	GF	GA	Pts
1	2	**San Jose Sharks**	82	43	21	12	6	219	183	104
2	5	**Dallas Stars**	82	41	26	13	2	194	175	97
3	11	Los Angeles Kings	82	28	29	16	9	205	217	81
4	12	Mighty Ducks of Anaheim	82	29	35	10	8	184	213	76
5	13	Phoenix Coyotes	82	22	36	18	6	188	245	68

Note: CR = Conference rank; GP = Games played; W = Wins; L = Losses; T = Ties; OTL = Overtime loss; GF = Goals for; GA = Goals against; Pts = Points
Bolded teams qualified for the playoffs.

Western Conference
R		Div	GP	W	L	T	OTL	GF	GA	Pts
**1**	**P-** Detroit Red Wings	**CE**	**82**	**48**	**21**	**11**	**2**	**255**	**189**	109
**2**	**Y-** San Jose Sharks	**PA**	**82**	**43**	**21**	**12**	**6**	**255**	**183**	104
**3**	**Y-** Vancouver Canucks	**NW**	**82**	**43**	**24**	**10**	**5**	**235**	**194**	101
**4**	**X-** Colorado Avalanche	**NW**	**82**	**40**	**22**	**13**	**7**	**236**	**198**	100
**5**	**X-** Dallas Stars	**PA**	**82**	**41**	**26**	**13**	**2**	**194**	**175**	97
**6**	**X-** Calgary Flames	**NW**	**82**	**42**	**30**	**7**	**3**	**200**	**176**	94
**7**	**X-** St. Louis Blues	**CE**	**82**	**39**	**30**	**11**	**2**	**191**	**198**	91
**8**	**X-** Nashville Predators	**CE**	**82**	**38**	**29**	**11**	**4**	**216**	**217**	91
8.5
9	Edmonton Oilers	NW	82	36	29	12	5	221	208	89
10	Minnesota Wild	NW	82	30	29	20	3	188	183	83
11	Los Angeles Kings	PA	82	28	29	16	9	205	217	81
12	Mighty Ducks of Anaheim	PA	82	29	35	10	8	184	213	76
13	Phoenix Coyotes	PA	82	22	36	18	6	188	245	68
14	Columbus Blue Jackets	CE	82	25	45	8	4	177	238	62
15	Chicago Blackhawks	CE	82	20	43	11	8	188	259	59

Divisions: CE – Central, PA – Pacific, NW – Northwest

P – Clinched Presidents Trophy; Y – Clinched division; X – Clinched playoff spot

== Schedule and results ==
2003–04 regular season
October: 4–5–1–1 (home: 1–3–1–1; road: 3–2–0–0)

Game	Date	Score	Opponent	Record	Recap
1	October 8, 2003	1–4	@ Dallas Stars (2003–04)	0–1–0–0	L
2	October 9, 2003	1–3	@ Nashville Predators (2003–04)	0–2–0–0	L
3	October 12, 2003	0–2	Phoenix Coyotes (2003–04)	0–3–0–0	L
4	October 17, 2003	0–3	Ottawa Senators (2003–04)	0–4–0–0	L
5	October 19, 2003	3–4 OT	Boston Bruins (2003–04)	0–4–0–1	OTL
6	October 21, 2003	2–0	@ San Jose Sharks (2003–04)	1–4–0–1	W
7	October 22, 2003	4–3 OT	Philadelphia Flyers (2003–04)	2–4–0–1	W
8	October 24, 2003	2–5	Buffalo Sabres (2003–04)	2–5–0–1	L
9	October 26, 2003	1–1 OT	Chicago Blackhawks (2003–04)	2–5–1–1	T
10	October 28, 2003	3–1	@ New York Rangers (2003–04)	3–5–1–1	W
11	October 29, 2003	4–2	@ Washington Capitals (2003–04)	4–5–1–1	W

November: 4–2–3–4 (home: 4–0–1–1; road: 0–2–2–3)

Game	Date	Score	Opponent	Record	Recap
12	November 1, 2003	1–4	@ New York Islanders (2003–04)	4–6–1–1	L
13	November 2, 2003	1–3	@ Chicago Blackhawks (2003–04)	4–7–1–1	L
14	November 4, 2003	1–2 OT	@ St. Louis Blues (2003–04)	4–7–1–2	OTL
15	November 8, 2003	3–4 OT	@ Phoenix Coyotes (2003–04)	4–7–1–3	OTL
16	November 9, 2003	2–1 OT	Phoenix Coyotes (2003–04)	5–7–1–3	W
17	November 12, 2003	5–1	Toronto Maple Leafs (2003–04)	6–7–1–3	W
18	November 16, 2003	4–3	St. Louis Blues (2003–04)	7–7–1–3	W
19	November 18, 2003	1–2 OT	@ Colorado Avalanche (2003–04)	7–7–1–4	OTL
20	November 19, 2003	3–3 OT	@ Dallas Stars (2003–04)	7–7–2–4	T
21	November 21, 2003	3–4 OT	Nashville Predators (2003–04)	7–7–2–5	OTL
22	November 26, 2003	3–3 OT	New Jersey Devils (2003–04)	7–7–3–5	T
23	November 28, 2003	4–3	Chicago Blackhawks (2003–04)	8–7–3–5	W
24	November 30, 2003	1–1 OT	@ Minnesota Wild (2003–04)	8–7–4–5	T

December: 5–8–0–0 (home: 3–2–0–0; road: 2–6–0–0)

Game	Date	Score	Opponent	Record	Recap
25	December 2, 2003	1–2	@ Columbus Blue Jackets (2003–04)	8–8–4–5	L
26	December 3, 2003	2–7	@ Detroit Red Wings (2003–04)	8–9–4–5	L
27	December 5, 2003	2–6	@ Atlanta Thrashers (2003–04)	8–10–4–5	L
28	December 7, 2003	4–0	Dallas Stars (2003–04)	9–10–4–5	W
29	December 10, 2003	3–2	San Jose Sharks (2003–04)	10–10–4–5	W
30	December 13, 2003	0–2	@ San Jose Sharks (2003–04)	10–11–4–5	L
31	December 14, 2003	2–3	Edmonton Oilers (2003–04)	10–12–4–5	L
32	December 19, 2003	1–0	Colorado Avalanche (2003–04)	11–12–4–5	W
33	December 21, 2003	1–2	San Jose Sharks (2003–04)	11–13–4–5	L
34	December 22, 2003	1–2	@ San Jose Sharks (2003–04)	11–14–4–5	L
35	December 27, 2003	2–3	@ Florida Panthers (2003–04)	11–15–4–5	L
36	December 29, 2003	2–0	@ Tampa Bay Lightning (2003–04)	12–15–4–5	W
37	December 31, 2003	3–1	@ Carolina Hurricanes (2003–04)	13–15–4–5	W

January: 3–7–4–1 (home: 2–2–4–1; road: 1–5–0–0)

Game	Date	Score	Opponent	Record	Recap
38	January 2, 2004	2–5	@ Buffalo Sabres (2003–04)	13–16–4–5	L
39	January 3, 2004	1–3	@ Detroit Red Wings (2003–04)	13–17–4–5	L
40	January 5, 2004	2–2 OT	Dallas Stars (2003–04)	13–17–5–5	T
41	January 7, 2004	4–4 OT	Los Angeles Kings (2003–04)	13–17–6–5	T
42	January 9, 2004	2–5	Vancouver Canucks (2003–04)	13–18–6–5	L
43	January 11, 2004	2–2 OT	Columbus Blue Jackets (2003–04)	13–18–7–5	T
44	January 13, 2004	1–3	@ Colorado Avalanche (2003–04)	13–19–7–5	L
45	January 15, 2004	0–1	@ Edmonton Oilers (2003–04)	13–20–7–5	L
46	January 17, 2004	2–1	@ Vancouver Canucks (2003–04)	14–20–7–5	W
47	January 19, 2004	1–5	Calgary Flames (2003–04)	14–21–7–5	L
48	January 21, 2004	2–2 OT	Detroit Red Wings (2003–04)	14–21–8–5	T
49	January 23, 2004	6–2	Minnesota Wild (2003–04)	15–21–8–5	W
50	January 24, 2004	2–4	@ Los Angeles Kings (2003–04)	15–22–8–5	L
51	January 28, 2004	3–4 OT	Los Angeles Kings (2003–04)	15–22–8–6	OTL
52	January 30, 2004	4–3 OT	Colorado Avalanche (2003–04)	16–22–8–6	W

February: 7–4–1–2 (home: 6–0–0–1; road: 1–4–1–1)

Game	Date	Score	Opponent	Record	Recap
53	February 1, 2004	4–6	@ Calgary Flames (2003–04)	16–23–8–6	L
54	February 2, 2004	1–2 OT	@ Edmonton Oilers (2003–04)	16–23–8–7	OTL
55	February 4, 2004	3–2	Carolina Hurricanes (2003–04)	17–23–8–7	W
56	February 11, 2004	5–3	Phoenix Coyotes (2003–04)	18–23–8–7	W
57	February 13, 2004	1–2	@ Calgary Flames (2003–04)	18–24–8–7	L
58	February 14, 2004	2–1	@ Vancouver Canucks (2003–04)	19–24–8–7	W
59	February 16, 2004	3–1	Dallas Stars (2003–04)	20–24–8–7	W
60	February 18, 2004	3–1	Columbus Blue Jackets (2003–04)	21–24–8–7	W
61	February 20, 2004	2–3 OT	Nashville Predators (2003–04)	21–24–8–8	OTL
62	February 22, 2004	0–4	@ Dallas Stars (2003–04)	21–25–8–8	L
63	February 23, 2004	1–1 OT	@ Phoenix Coyotes (2003–04)	21–25–9–8	T
64	February 25, 2004	4–2	Edmonton Oilers (2003–04)	22–25–9–8	W
65	February 28, 2004	1–2	@ Los Angeles Kings (2003–04)	22–26–9–8	L
66	February 29, 2004	6–3	Los Angeles Kings (2003–04)	23–26–9–8	W

March: 5–9–1–0 (home: 2–4–1–0; road: 3–5–0–0)

Game	Date	Score	Opponent	Record	Recap
67	March 3, 2004	2–0	Minnesota Wild (2003–04)	24–26–9–8	W
68	March 5, 2004	5–2	@ Chicago Blackhawks (2003–04)	25–26–9–8	W
69	March 6, 2004	1–2	@ Pittsburgh Penguins (2003–04)	25–27–9–8	L
70	March 8, 2004	2–5	Montreal Canadiens (2003–04)	25–28–9–8	L
71	March 12, 2004	1–3	New York Islanders (2003–04)	25–29–9–8	L
72	March 14, 2004	1–5	@ Los Angeles Kings (2003–04)	25–30–9–8	L
73	March 16, 2004	3–2 OT	@ Phoenix Coyotes (2003–04)	26–30–9–8	W
74	March 17, 2004	1–1 OT	St. Louis Blues (2003–04)	26–30–10–8	T
75	March 19, 2004	2–4	San Jose Sharks (2003–04)	26–31–10–8	L
76	March 21, 2004	8–6	Detroit Red Wings (2003–04)	27–31–10–8	W
77	March 23, 2004	4–1	@ Nashville Predators (2003–04)	28–31–10–8	W
78	March 25, 2004	2–3	@ St. Louis Blues (2003–04)	28–32–10–8	L
79	March 26, 2004	1–3	@ Columbus Blue Jackets (2003–04)	28–33–10–8	L
80	March 28, 2004	1–2	@ Minnesota Wild (2003–04)	28–34–10–8	L
81	March 31, 2004	1–2	Vancouver Canucks (2003–04)	28–35–10–8	L

April: 1–0–0–0 (home: 1–0–0–0; road: 0–0–0–0)

Game	Date	Score	Opponent	Record	Recap
82	April 4, 2004	2–1	Calgary Flames (2003–04)	29–35–10–8	W

Legend: W Win (2 points) L Loss (0 points) T Tie (1 point) OTL Overtime loss (1 point)

== Player statistics ==
=== Scoring ===
- Position abbreviations: C = Center; D = Defense; G = Goaltender; LW = Left wing; RW = Right wing
- † = Joined team via a transaction (e.g., trade, waivers, signing) during the season. Stats reflect time with the Mighty Ducks only.
- ‡ = Left team via a transaction (e.g., trade, waivers, release) during the season. Stats reflect time with the Mighty Ducks only.

No.	Player	Pos	Regular season					
No.	Player	Pos	GP	G	A	Pts	+/-	PIM
91	Sergei Fedorov	C	80	31	34	65	−5	42
40	Vaclav Prospal	LW	82	19	35	54	−9	54
39	Petr Sykora	RW	81	23	29	52	−9	34
20	Steve Rucchin	C	82	20	23	43	−14	12
15	Joffrey Lupul	RW	75	13	21	34	−6	28
19	Andy McDonald	LW	79	9	21	30	−13	24
44	Rob Niedermayer	LW	55	12	16	28	−6	34
28	Niclas Havelid	D	79	6	20	26	−28	28
26	Samuel Pahlsson	C	82	8	14	22	−2	52
10	Jason Krog	RW	80	6	12	18	−4	16
23	Stanislav Chistov	RW	56	2	16	18	−16	26
5	Vitaly Vishnevski	D	73	6	10	16	0	51
8	Sandis Ozolinsh	D	36	5	11	16	−7	24
24	Ruslan Salei	D	82	4	11	15	−1	110
14	Martin Skoula†	D	21	2	7	9	3	2
2	Todd Simpson‡	D	46	4	3	7	−6	105
3	Keith Carney	D	69	2	5	7	−5	42
38	Chris Kunitz	LW	21	0	6	6	1	12
34	Kurt Sauer‡	D	55	1	4	5	−8	32
12	Mike Leclerc	LW	10	1	3	4	−1	4
4	Lance Ward	D	46	0	4	4	−1	94
17 (Note: Severson originally wore number 14 until Skoula was acquired.)	Cam Severson	LW	31	3	0	3	−3	50
55	Garrett Burnett	LW	39	1	2	3	0	184
27	Craig Johnson‡	C	39	1	2	3	−4	14
18	Michael Holmqvist	RW	21	2	0	2	−6	25
27	Petr Schastlivy†	LW	22	2	0	2	−3	4
46	Tony Martensson	C	6	1	1	2	−2	0
35	Jean-Sebastien Giguere	G	55	0	2	2		4
41	Chris Armstrong	D	4	0	1	1	−1	0
22	Alexei Smirnov	RW	8	0	1	1	0	2
30	Ilya Bryzgalov	G	1	0	0	0		0
21	Dan Bylsma	RW	11	0	0	0	−3	0
29	Martin Gerber	G	32	0	0	0		4
48	Casey Hankinson	LW	4	0	0	0	0	4
33	Mark Popovic	D	1	0	0	0	0	0

=== Goaltending ===
No.	Player	Regular season									
No.	Player	GP	W	L	T	SA	GA	GAA	SV%	SO	TOI
35	Jean-Sebastien Giguere	55	17	31	6	1623	140	2.62	.914	3	3210
29	Martin Gerber	32	11	12	4	785	64	2.26	.918	2	1698
30	Ilya Bryzgalov	1	1	0	0	28	2	1.98	.929	0	60

== Awards and records ==
=== Awards ===
Type	Award/honor	Recipient	Ref
League (in-season)	NHL YoungStars Game selection	Joffrey Lupul	

=== Milestones ===
Milestone	Player	Date	Ref
First game	Garrett Burnett	October 8, 2003	
First game	Joffrey Lupul	October 8, 2003	
First game	Michael Holmqvist	October 9, 2003	
First game	Tony Martensson	December 2, 2003	
First game	Mark Popovic	January 2, 2004	
First game	Chris Kunitz	January 17, 2004	
1,000th point	Sergei Fedorov	February 14, 2004	

== Transactions ==
The Mighty Ducks were involved in the following transactions from June 10, 2003, the day after the deciding game of the 2003 Stanley Cup Finals, through June 7, 2004, the day of the deciding game of the 2004 Stanley Cup Finals.

=== Trades ===
Date	Details		Ref
June 21, 2003	To Dallas Stars: 2nd-round pick in 2003; San Jose’s 2nd-round pick in 2003	To Mighty Ducks of Anaheim: 1st-round pick in 2003	
June 22, 2003	To Nashville Predators: 4th-round pick in 2004; 5th-round pick in 2004	To Mighty Ducks of Anaheim: 4th-round pick in 2003	
August 12, 2003	To Colorado Avalanche: Travis Brigley	To Mighty Ducks of Anaheim: Future considerations	
January 17, 2004	To Phoenix Coyotes: Todd Reirden	To Mighty Ducks of Anaheim: Future considerations	
February 4, 2004	To Ottawa Senators: Todd Simpson	To Mighty Ducks of Anaheim: Petr Schastlivy	
February 21, 2004	To Colorado Avalanche: Kurt Sauer; 4th-round pick in 2005	To Mighty Ducks of Anaheim: Martin Skoula	

=== Players acquired ===
Date	Player	Former team	Term	Via	Ref
June 26, 2003	Chris Armstrong	Augsburger Panther (DEL)	1-year (Note: Club option for a second year.)	Free agency	
July 17, 2003	Vaclav Prospal	Tampa Bay Lightning	5-year	Free agency	
July 19, 2003	Sergei Fedorov	Detroit Red Wings	5-year	Free agency	
July 21, 2003	Sheldon Brookbank	Grand Rapids Griffins (AHL)	2-year	Free agency	
July 23, 2003	Eddie Ferhi	Cincinnati Mighty Ducks (AHL)	2-year	Free agency	
July 25, 2003	Garrett Burnett	Hartford Wolf Pack (AHL)	1-year	Free agency	
July 25, 2003	Casey Hankinson	Chicago Blackhawks	1-year	Free agency	
July 25, 2003	Mike Mottau	Calgary Flames	1-year	Free agency	
August 29, 2003	Keith Aucoin	Providence Bruins (AHL)	1-year	Free agency	
September 9, 2003	Craig Johnson	Los Angeles Kings	1-year	Free agency	
October 3, 2003	Todd Simpson	Phoenix Coyotes		Waiver draft	
March 25, 2004	Curtis Glencross	University of Alaska Anchorage (WCHA)	3-year	Free agency	
May 12, 2004	Dustin Penner	University of Maine (HE)	3-year	Free agency	
June 7, 2004	Aaron Rome	Moose Jaw Warriors (WHL)	3-year	Free agency	

=== Players lost ===
Date	Player	New team	Via (Note: In parentheses is the player's free agency group on July 1 if applicable.)	Ref
July 1, 2003	Jarrett Smith (Note: Smith retired.)		Contract expiration (UFA)	
July 3, 2003	Paul Kariya	Colorado Avalanche	Free agency (UFA)	
July 6, 2003	Peter Podhradsky	HC Pardubice (ELH)	Free agency (UFA)	
July 9, 2003	Fredrik Olausson	HV71 (SHL)	Free agency (III)	
July 28, 2003	Marc Chouinard	Minnesota Wild	Free agency (UFA)	
August 17, 2003	Kevin Sawyer		Retirement (UFA)	
August 28, 2003	Rob Valicevic	Dallas Stars	Free agency (UFA)	
September 1, 2003	Jonathan Hedstrom	Djurgardens IF (SHL)	Free agency (II) (Note: Anaheim retained Hedstrom’s NHL rights and re-signed him on August 18, 2005.)	
September 15, 2003	Josh DeWolf	Houston Aeros (AHL)	Free agency (VI)	
September 15, 2003	Chris O'Sullivan		Retirement (VI)	
October 7, 2003	Ben Guite	Bridgeport Sound Tigers (AHL)	Free agency (UFA)	
October 8, 2003	Brendan Yarema	Chicago Wolves (AHL)	Free agency (UFA)	
October 11, 2003	Mike Brown	St. John's Maple Leafs (AHL)	Free agency (UFA)	
November 5, 2003	Steve Thomas	Detroit Red Wings	Free agency (III)	
November 8, 2003	Francis Belanger	Charlotte Checkers (ECHL)	Free agency (VI)	
November 17, 2003	Adam Oates	Edmonton Oilers	Free agency (III)	
January 10, 2004	Craig Johnson	Toronto Maple Leafs	Waivers	
April 2, 2004	Chris Armstrong	ERC Ingolstadt (DEL)	Free agency	
May 17, 2004	Tony Martensson	Linkopings HC (SHL)	Free agency (Note: Anaheim retained Martensson’s NHL rights through the 2007–08 season.)	

=== Signings ===
Date	Player	Term	Contract type	Ref
July 15, 2003	Mike Leclerc	2-year	Re-signing	
July 15, 2003	Cam Severson	1-year	Re-signing	
July 21, 2003	Nick Smith	1-year	Re-signing	
July 22, 2003	Samuel Pahlsson	2-year	Re-signing	
July 22, 2003	Lance Ward	2-year	Re-signing	
July 23, 2003	Juha Alen	3-year	Entry-level	
July 23, 2003	Martin Gerber	1-year	Option exercised	
July 23, 2003	Vitaly Vishnevski	1-year	Re-signing	
August 6, 2003	Niclas Havelid	3-year	Re-signing	
September 10, 2003	Jean-Sebastien Giguere	4-year	Re-signing	
September 14, 2003	Petr Sykora	3-year	Re-signing	

== Draft picks ==
Anaheim's draft picks at the 2003 NHL entry draft held at the Gaylord Entertainment Center in Nashville, Tennessee.

Round	#	Player	Nationality	College/Junior/Club team (League)
1	19	Ryan Getzlaf	Canada	Calgary Hitmen (WHL)
1	28	Corey Perry	Canada	London Knights (OHL)
3	86	Shane Hynes	Canada	Cornell University (HE)
3	90	Juha Alen	Finland	Northern Michigan University (CCHA)
4	119	Nathan Saunders	Canada	Moncton Wildcats (QMJHL)
6	186	Drew Miller	United States	River City Lancers (USHL)
7	218	Dirk Southern	Canada	Northern Michigan University (CCHA)
8	250	Shane O'Brien	Canada	Kingston Frontenacs (OHL)
9	280	Ville Mantymaa	Finland	Tappara (Finland)

== Farm teams ==
- Cincinnati Mighty Ducks

== See also ==
- 2003–04 NHL season
