= 2003–04 New York Islanders season =

NHL hockey team season

2003–04 New York Islanders
- Division: 3rd Atlantic
- Conference: 8th Eastern
- 2003–04 record: 38–29–11–4
- Home record: 25–11–4–1
- Road record: 13–18–7–3
- Goals for: 237
- Goals against: 210

Team information
- General manager: Mike Milbury
- Coach: Steve Stirling
- Captain: Michael Peca
- Alternate captains: Adrian Aucoin; Kenny Jonsson; Alexei Yashin
- Arena: Nassau Veterans Memorial Coliseum
- Average attendance: 13,693 (84.3%)
- Minor league affiliate: Bridgeport Sound Tigers

Team leaders
- Goals: Mariusz Czerkawski (25); Trent Hunter (25)
- Assists: Oleg Kvasha (36)
- Points: Oleg Kvasha (51); Trent Hunter (51)
- Penalty minutes: Eric Cairns (189)
- Plus/minus: Adrian Aucoin (+29)
- Wins: Rick DiPietro (23)
- Goals against average: Rick DiPietro (2.36)

The 2003–04 New York Islanders season was the 32nd season in the franchise's history.

== Offseason ==
Head coach Peter Laviolette was fired on June 3, 2003, and replaced by Bridgeport Sound Tigers head coach Steve Stirling.

== Regular season ==
=== Final standings ===
Atlantic Division
No.	CR		GP	W	L	T	OTL	GF	GA	PTS
1	3	**Philadelphia Flyers**	82	40	21	15	6	229	186	101
2	6	**New Jersey Devils**	82	43	25	12	2	213	164	100
3	8	**New York Islanders**	82	38	29	11	4	237	210	91
4	13	New York Rangers	82	27	40	7	8	206	250	69
5	15	Pittsburgh Penguins	82	23	47	8	4	190	303	58

Note: CR = Conference rank; GP = Games played; W = Wins; L = Losses; T = Ties; OTL = Overtime loss; GF = Goals for; GA = Goals against; Pts = Points
Bolded teams qualified for the playoffs.

Eastern Conference
R		Div	GP	W	L	T	OTL	GF	GA	Pts
**1**	**Z-** Tampa Bay Lightning	**SE**	**82**	**46**	**22**	**8**	**6**	**245**	**192**	106
**2**	**Y-** Boston Bruins	**NE**	**82**	**41**	**19**	**15**	**7**	**209**	**188**	104
**3**	**Y-** Philadelphia Flyers	**AT**	**82**	**40**	**21**	**15**	**6**	**209**	**188**	101
**4**	**X-** Toronto Maple Leafs	**NE**	**82**	**45**	**24**	**10**	**3**	**242**	**204**	103
**5**	**X-** Ottawa Senators	**NE**	**82**	**43**	**23**	**10**	**6**	**262**	**189**	102
**6**	**X-** New Jersey Devils	**AT**	**82**	**43**	**25**	**12**	**2**	**213**	**164**	100
**7**	**X-** Montreal Canadiens	**NE**	**82**	**41**	**30**	**7**	**4**	**208**	**192**	93
**8**	**X-** New York Islanders	**AT**	**82**	**38**	**29**	**11**	**4**	**237**	**210**	91
8.5
9	Buffalo Sabres	NE	82	37	34	7	4	220	221	85
10	Atlanta Thrashers	SE	82	33	37	8	4	214	243	78
11	Carolina Hurricanes	SE	82	28	34	14	6	172	209	76
12	Florida Panthers	SE	82	28	35	15	4	188	221	75
13	New York Rangers	AT	82	27	40	7	8	206	250	69
14	Washington Capitals	SE	82	23	46	10	3	186	253	59
15	Pittsburgh Penguins	AT	82	23	47	8	4	190	303	58

Divisions: AT – Atlantic, NE – Northeast, SE – Southeast

Z – Clinched conference; Y – Clinched division; X – Clinched playoff spot

== Schedule and results ==
=== Regular season ===
2003–04 regular season
October: 4–3–2–0 (home: 3–1–0–0; road: 1–2–2–0)

Game	Date	Score	Opponent	Record	Recap
1	October 9, 2003	1–6	@ Washington Capitals (2003–04)	0–1–0–0	L
2	October 11, 2003	6–0	@ Buffalo Sabres (2003–04)	1–1–0–0	W
3	October 14, 2003	2–2 OT	@ Atlanta Thrashers (2003–04)	1–1–1–0	T
4	October 18, 2003	2–1	Florida Panthers (2003–04)	2–1–1–0	W
5	October 20, 2003	5–2	Toronto Maple Leafs (2003–04)	3–1–1–0	W
6	October 23, 2003	0–3	@ Montreal Canadiens (2003–04)	3–2–1–0	L
7	October 25, 2003	7–2	Pittsburgh Penguins (2003–04)	4–2–1–0	W
8	October 28, 2003	0–4	New Jersey Devils (2003–04)	4–3–1–0	L
9	October 29, 2003	4–4 OT	@ Pittsburgh Penguins (2003–04)	4–3–2–0	T

November: 5–8–0–0 (home: 4–3–0–0; road: 1–5–0–0)

Game	Date	Score	Opponent	Record	Recap
10	November 1, 2003	4–1	Mighty Ducks of Anaheim (2003–04)	5–3–2–0	W
11	November 3, 2003	6–3	Ottawa Senators (2003–04)	6–3–2–0	W
12	November 6, 2003	4–1	Dallas Stars (2003–04)	7–3–2–0	W
13	November 8, 2003	3–4	Atlanta Thrashers (2003–04)	7–4–2–0	L
14	November 11, 2003	1–2	@ Philadelphia Flyers (2003–04)	7–5–2–0	L
15	November 13, 2003	3–1	Montreal Canadiens (2003–04)	8–5–2–0	W
16	November 15, 2003	3–4	@ Nashville Predators (2003–04)	8–6–2–0	L
17	November 19, 2003	4–1	@ Florida Panthers (2003–04)	9–6–2–0	W
18	November 20, 2003	2–3	@ Tampa Bay Lightning (2003–04)	9–7–2–0	L
19	November 22, 2003	1–2	@ Columbus Blue Jackets (2003–04)	9–8–2–0	L
20	November 26, 2003	0–2	Carolina Hurricanes (2003–04)	9–9–2–0	L
21	November 28, 2003	0–6	@ Detroit Red Wings (2003–04)	9–10–2–0	L
22	November 29, 2003	1–5	Philadelphia Flyers (2003–04)	9–11–2–0	L

December: 10–4–0–1 (home: 7–2–0–0; road: 3–2–0–1)

Game	Date	Score	Opponent	Record	Recap
23	December 2, 2003	1–4	Washington Capitals (2003–04)	9–12–2–0	L
24	December 4, 2003	2–4	New York Rangers (2003–04)	9–13–2–0	L
25	December 6, 2003	5–2	Chicago Blackhawks (2003–04)	10–13–2–0	W
26	December 9, 2003	5–2	Tampa Bay Lightning (2003–04)	11–13–2–0	W
27	December 10, 2003	0–1 OT	@ New Jersey Devils (2003–04)	11–13–2–1	OTL
28	December 13, 2003	4–0	Atlanta Thrashers (2003–04)	12–13–2–1	W
29	December 16, 2003	5–4	New Jersey Devils (2003–04)	13–13–2–1	W
30	December 18, 2003	3–4	@ New York Rangers (2003–04)	13–14–2–1	L
31	December 20, 2003	1–3	@ Philadelphia Flyers (2003–04)	13–15–2–1	L
32	December 21, 2003	5–4	@ Washington Capitals (2003–04)	14–15–2–1	W
33	December 23, 2003	4–2	Philadelphia Flyers (2003–04)	15–15–2–1	W
34	December 26, 2003	4–3 OT	@ New Jersey Devils (2003–04)	16–15–2–1	W
35	December 27, 2003	3–1	Toronto Maple Leafs (2003–04)	17–15–2–1	W
36	December 29, 2003	3–1	New Jersey Devils (2003–04)	18–15–2–1	W
37	December 31, 2003	6–1	@ Pittsburgh Penguins (2003–04)	19–15–2–1	W

January: 6–5–3–1 (home: 4–2–1–0; road: 2–3–2–1)

Game	Date	Score	Opponent	Record	Recap
38	January 1, 2004	0–1	@ Ottawa Senators (2003–04)	19–16–2–1	L
39	January 3, 2004	3–3 OT	@ Boston Bruins (2003–04)	19–16–3–1	T
40	January 6, 2004	2–3	Calgary Flames (2003–04)	19–17–3–1	L
41	January 8, 2004	3–2	Edmonton Oilers (2003–04)	20–17–3–1	W
42	January 10, 2004	2–3	New York Rangers (2003–04)	20–18–3–1	L
43	January 13, 2004	1–4	@ New York Rangers (2003–04)	20–19–3–1	L
44	January 15, 2004	4–4 OT	@ Ottawa Senators (2003–04)	20–19–4–1	T
45	January 17, 2004	4–2	Buffalo Sabres (2003–04)	21–19–4–1	W
46	January 19, 2004	5–2	Ottawa Senators (2003–04)	22–19–4–1	W
47	January 20, 2004	0–2	@ Toronto Maple Leafs (2003–04)	22–20–4–1	L
48	January 23, 2004	3–2	@ Carolina Hurricanes (2003–04)	23–20–4–1	W
49	January 24, 2004	3–0	@ Atlanta Thrashers (2003–04)	24–20–4–1	W
50	January 27, 2004	2–2 OT	Boston Bruins (2003–04)	24–20–5–1	T
51	January 29, 2004	1–2 OT	@ Boston Bruins (2003–04)	24–20–5–2	OTL
52	January 31, 2004	4–2	Florida Panthers (2003–04)	25–20–5–2	W

February: 5–3–4–1 (home: 3–1–2–1; road: 2–2–2–0)

Game	Date	Score	Opponent	Record	Recap
53	February 3, 2004	5–4 OT	Vancouver Canucks (2003–04)	26–20–5–2	W
54	February 5, 2004	1–2	@ Montreal Canadiens (2003–04)	26–21–5–2	L
55	February 10, 2004	1–1 OT	@ Colorado Avalanche (2003–04)	26–21–6–2	T
56	February 11, 2004	4–4 OT	@ Dallas Stars (2003–04)	26–21–7–2	T
57	February 13, 2004	5–2	@ Phoenix Coyotes (2003–04)	27–21–7–2	W
58	February 16, 2004	1–1 OT	Los Angeles Kings (2003–04)	27–21–8–2	T
59	February 18, 2004	4–3	Pittsburgh Penguins (2003–04)	28–21–8–2	W
60	February 19, 2004	2–6	@ New York Rangers (2003–04)	28–22–8–2	L
61	February 21, 2004	4–1	Buffalo Sabres (2003–04)	29–22–8–2	W
62	February 24, 2004	0–0 OT	Boston Bruins (2003–04)	29–22–9–2	T
63	February 26, 2004	3–6	New York Rangers (2003–04)	29–23–9–2	L
64	February 27, 2004	4–2	@ Buffalo Sabres (2003–04)	30–23–9–2	W
65	February 29, 2004	2–3 OT	Pittsburgh Penguins (2003–04)	30–23–9–3	OTL

March: 7–6–1–1 (home: 4–2–0–0; road: 3–4–1–1)

Game	Date	Score	Opponent	Record	Recap
66	March 2, 2004	3–3 OT	@ Pittsburgh Penguins (2003–04)	30–23–10–3	T
67	March 4, 2004	2–6	@ Toronto Maple Leafs (2003–04)	30–24–10–3	L
68	March 6, 2004	2–4	St. Louis Blues (2003–04)	30–25–10–3	L
69	March 9, 2004	2–3 OT	@ St. Louis Blues (2003–04)	30–25–10–4	OTL
70	March 11, 2004	4–5	@ San Jose Sharks (2003–04)	30–26–10–4	L
71	March 12, 2004	3–1	@ Mighty Ducks of Anaheim (2003–04)	31–26–10–4	W
72	March 16, 2004	3–1	@ Tampa Bay Lightning (2003–04)	32–26–10–4	W
73	March 17, 2004	4–6	@ Florida Panthers (2003–04)	32–27–10–4	L
74	March 19, 2004	3–1	Minnesota Wild (2003–04)	33–27–10–4	W
75	March 21, 2004	3–0	Tampa Bay Lightning (2003–04)	34–27–10–4	W
76	March 23, 2004	3–0	Washington Capitals (2003–04)	35–27–10–4	W
77	March 25, 2004	4–2	@ Philadelphia Flyers (2003–04)	36–27–10–4	W
78	March 27, 2004	2–3	Carolina Hurricanes (2003–04)	36–28–10–4	L
79	March 28, 2004	2–3	@ New Jersey Devils (2003–04)	36–29–10–4	L
80	March 31, 2004	5–1	Montreal Canadiens (2003–04)	37–29–10–4	W

April: 1–0–1–0 (home: 0–0–1–0; road: 1–0–0–0)

Game	Date	Score	Opponent	Record	Recap
81	April 2, 2004	6–4	@ Carolina Hurricanes (2003–04)	38–29–10–4	W
82	April 4, 2004	3–3 OT	Philadelphia Flyers (2003–04)	38–29–11–4	T

Legend: W Win (2 points) L Loss (0 points) T Tie (1 point) OTL Overtime loss (1 point)

=== Playoffs ===
2004 Stanley Cup playoffs
Eastern Conference Quarterfinals vs. (1) Tampa Bay Lightning – Lightning win 4–1

Game	Date	Visitor	Score	Home	Location/Attendance	Series	Recap
1	April 8	New York Islanders	0–3	Tampa Bay Lightning	St. Pete Times Forum (18,536)	0–1	L
2	April 10	New York Islanders	3–0	Tampa Bay Lightning	St. Pete Times Forum (19,982)	1–1	W
3	April 12	Tampa Bay Lightning	3–0	New York Islanders	Nassau Veterans Memorial Coliseum (16,234)	1–2	L
4	April 14	Tampa Bay Lightning	3–0	New York Islanders	Nassau Veterans Memorial Coliseum (16,234)	1–3	L
5	April 16	New York Islanders	2–3 OT	Tampa Bay Lightning	St. Pete Times Forum (20,927)	1–4	L

Legend: W Win L Loss

== Player statistics ==
=== Scoring ===
- Position abbreviations: C = Center; D = Defense; G = Goaltender; LW = Left wing; RW = Right wing
- † = Joined team via a transaction (e.g., trade, waivers, signing) during the season. Stats reflect time with the Islanders only.
- ‡ = Left team via a transaction (e.g., trade, waivers, release) during the season. Stats reflect time with the Islanders only.

No.	Player	Pos	Regular season						Playoffs					
No.	Player	Pos	GP	G	A	Pts	+/-	PIM	GP	G	A	Pts	+/-	PIM
7	Trent Hunter	RW	77	25	26	51	23	16	5	0	0	0	−2	4
12	Oleg Kvasha	LW	81	15	36	51	4	48	5	1	0	1	−1	0
21	Mariusz Czerkawski	RW	81	25	24	49	8	16	5	0	1	1	−1	0
55	Jason Blake	LW	75	22	25	47	11	56	4	2	0	2	−2	2
3	Adrian Aucoin	D	81	13	31	44	29	54	5	0	0	0	−6	6
27	Michael Peca	C	76	11	29	40	17	71	5	0	0	0	−1	6
37	Mark Parrish	RW	59	24	11	35	8	18	5	1	2	3	−4	0
79	Alexei Yashin	C	47	15	19	34	−1	10	5	0	1	1	−2	0
17	Shawn Bates	C	69	9	23	32	−8	46	5	0	0	0	−2	4
4	Roman Hamrlik	D	81	7	22	29	2	68	5	0	1	1	0	2
29	Kenny Jonsson	D	79	5	24	29	25	22	5	0	0	0	−4	2
44	Janne Niinimaa	D	82	9	19	28	12	64	5	1	2	3	−2	2
38	Dave Scatchard	C	61	9	16	25	12	78	5	0	1	1	−3	6
45	Arron Asham	LW	79	12	12	24	−12	92	5	0	1	1	0	4
77	Cliff Ronning†	C	40	9	15	24	3	2	4	0	0	0	−2	0
11	Mattias Weinhandl	RW	55	8	12	20	9	26	5	0	0	0	−2	2
26	Justin Papineau	C	64	8	5	13	4	8	—	—	—	—	—	—
33	Eric Cairns	D	72	2	6	8	−5	189	1	0	0	0	−2	0
24	Radek Martinek	D	47	4	3	7	−9	43	5	0	1	1	2	0
52	Sven Butenschon	D	41	1	6	7	−3	30	4	0	0	0	−1	0
16	Justin Mapletoft	C	27	1	4	5	−1	6	—	—	—	—	—	—
28	Jason Wiemer‡	C	13	1	3	4	−1	24	—	—	—	—	—	—
10	Sean Bergenheim	LW	18	1	1	2	−4	4	—	—	—	—	—	—
2	Mattias Timander‡	D	5	1	1	2	2	2	—	—	—	—	—	—
39	Rick DiPietro	G	50	0	2	2		22	5	0	0	0		0
20	Eric Manlow	C	18	0	2	2	−2	2	—	—	—	—	—	—
49	Eric Godard	RW	31	0	1	1	−2	97	—	—	—	—	—	—
25	Alexander Karpovtsev†	D	3	0	1	1	1	4	—	—	—	—	—	—
30	Garth Snow	G	39	0	1	1		28	—	—	—	—	—	—
41	Derek Bekar	LW	4	0	0	0	0	2	—	—	—	—	—	—
34	Wade Dubielewicz	G	2	0	0	0		0	—	—	—	—	—	—
18	Jeff Hamilton	C	1	0	0	0	0	0	—	—	—	—	—	—
8	Tomi Pettinen	D	4	0	0	0	−2	2	—	—	—	—	—	—
20	Steve Webb†	RW	5	0	0	0	−1	2	2	0	0	0	−1	6

=== Goaltending ===
No.	Player	Regular season										Playoffs								
No.	Player	GP	W	L	T	SA	GA	GAA	SV%	SO	TOI	GP	W	L	SA	GA	GAA	SV%	SO	TOI
39	Rick DiPietro	50	23	18	5	1261	112	2.36	.911	5	2844	5	1	4	120	11	2.18	.908	1	303
30	Garth Snow	39	14	15	5	932	94	2.80	.899	1	2015	—	—	—	—	—	—	—	—	—
34	Wade Dubielewicz	2	1	0	1	50	3	1.71	.940	0	105	—	—	—	—	—	—	—	—	—

== Awards and records ==
=== Awards ===
Type	Award/honor	Recipient	Ref
League (annual)	NHL All-Rookie Team	Trent Hunter (Forward)	
League (in-season)	NHL All-Star Game selection	Adrian Aucoin	
League (in-season)	NHL Defensive Player of the Week	Rick DiPietro (October 20)	
League (in-season)	NHL Defensive Player of the Week	Adrian Aucoin (November 10)	
League (in-season)	NHL Defensive Player of the Week	Adrian Aucoin (March 22)	
League (in-season)	NHL Rookie of the Month	Trent Hunter (December)	
League (in-season)	NHL YoungStars Game selection	Trent Hunter	
Team	Bob Nystrom Award	Adrian Aucoin	

=== Milestones ===
Milestone	Player	Date	Ref
First game	Sean Bergenheim	October 9, 2003	
First game	Jeff Hamilton	December 2, 2003	
First game	Wade Dubielewicz	March 25, 2004	

== Transactions ==
The Islanders were involved in the following transactions from June 10, 2003, the day after the deciding game of the 2003 Stanley Cup Finals, through June 7, 2004, the day of the deciding game of the 2004 Stanley Cup Finals.

=== Trades ===
Date	Details		Ref
January 22, 2004	To Philadelphia Flyers: Mattias Timander	To New York Islanders: Tampa Bay's 7th-round pick in 2004	
March 8, 2004	To Pittsburgh Penguins: Alain Nasreddine	To New York Islanders: Steve Webb	
March 9, 2004	To Chicago Blackhawks: 4th-round pick in 2005	To New York Islanders: Alexander Karpovtsev	

=== Players acquired ===
Date	Player	Former team	Term	Via	Ref
July 1, 2003	Rob Collins	Grand Rapids Griffins (AHL)		Free agency	
July 8, 2003	Ryan Kraft	San Jose Sharks		Free agency	
July 17, 2003	Mariusz Czerkawski	Montreal Canadiens	1-year	Free agency	
July 23, 2003	Cail MacLean	Hershey Bears (AHL)	1-year	Free agency	
August 7, 2003	Dieter Kochan	Minnesota Wild		Free agency	
September 9, 2003	Cole Jarrett	Plymouth Whalers (OHL)		Free agency	
September 10, 2003	Derek Bekar	Los Angeles Kings		Free agency	
January 9, 2004	Cliff Ronning	Minnesota Wild		Free agency	

=== Players lost ===
Date	Player	New team	Via (Note: In parentheses is the player's free agency group on July 1 if applicable.)	Ref
July 1, 2003	Kevin Haller (Note: Haller, who last played during the 2001–02 season, retired.)		Contract expiration (III)	
July 15, 2003	Steve Valiquette	Edmonton Oilers	Free agency (VI)	
July 17, 2003	Ray Schultz	Nashville Predators	Free agency (VI)	
August 12, 2003	Randy Robitaille	Atlanta Thrashers	Free agency (UFA)	
September 10, 2003	David St. Germain	Hartford Wolf Pack (AHL)	Free agency (UFA)	
October 1, 2003	Konstantin Kalmikov	Louisiana IceGators (ECHL)	Free agency (VI)	
October 21, 2003	Steve Webb	Philadelphia Flyers	Free agency (UFA)	
November 13, 2003	Jason Wiemer	Minnesota Wild	Waivers	
January 15, 2004	Marco Charpentier	Toledo Storm (ECHL)	Free agency (UFA)	
May 27, 2004	Alan Letang	Hamburg Freezers (DEL)	Free agency	

=== Signings ===
Date	Player	Term	Contract type	Ref
June 25, 2003	Eric Godard	2-year	Re-signing	
July 10, 2003	Kenny Jönsson	2-year	Re-signing	
July 14, 2003	Radek Martinek	2-year	Re-signing	
July 18, 2003	Arron Asham	2-year	Re-signing	
July 18, 2003	Jason Wiemer	1-year	Re-signing	
July 21, 2003	Trent Hunter	1-year	Re-signing	
July 22, 2003	Rick DiPietro	1-year	Re-signing	
July 22, 2003	Garth Snow	1-year	Re-signing	
July 23, 2003	Sean Bergenheim	3-year	Entry-level	
August 5, 2003	Justin Papineau	1-year	Re-signing	
September 26, 2003	Jeff Hamilton		Re-signing	
October 4, 2003	Bruno Gervais	3-year	Entry-level	

== Draft picks ==
The Islanders' had 9 picks in the 2003 NHL entry draft, which was held at the Gaylord Entertainment Center in Nashville, Tennessee.

Round	#	Player	Pos	Nationality	College/Junior/Club team (League)
1	15	Robert Nilsson	Forward	Canada	Leksands IF (Elitserien)
2	48	Dmitri Chernykh	Right wing	Russia	Khimik Voskresensk (RSL)
2	53^{[a]}	Evgeni Tunik	Forward	Russia	Kristall Elektrostal (RUS)
2	58^{[b]}	Jeremy Colliton	Center	Canada	Prince Albert Raiders (WHL)
4	120	Stefan Blaho	Right wing	Slovakia	Dukla Trenčín Jr. (SVK Jr)
6	182	Bruno Gervais	Defense	Canada	Acadie-Bathurst Titan (QMJHL)
7	212	Denis Rehak	Defense	Slovakia	Dukla Trenčín Jr. (SVK Jr)
8	238^{[c]}	Cody Blanshan	Defense	United States	University of Nebraska Omaha (CCHA)
8	246	Igor Volkov	Right wing	Russia	Salavat Yulaev Ufa (RSL)

Draft notes

- ^{a} The Edmonton Oilers' second-round pick (originally from the Washington Capitals) went to the New York Islanders as a result of a March 11, 2003 trade that sent Brad Isbister and Raffi Torres to the Oilers in exchange for Janne Niinimaa and this pick.
- ^{b} The St. Louis Blues' second-round pick went to the New York Islanders as a result of a March 11, 2003 trade that sent Chris Osgood and a 2003 third-round pick to the Blues in exchange for Justin Papineau and this pick.
- The New York Islanders' third-round pick went to the St. Louis Blues as the result of a March 11, 2003 trade that sent Justin Papineau and a 2003 second-round pick to the Islanders in exchange for Chris Osgood and this pick.
- The New York Islanders' fifth-round pick went to the Florida Panthers as the result of a March 19, 2002 trade that sent Darren Van Impe to the Islanders in exchange for this pick.
- ^{c} Compensatory pick received from NHL as compensation for Group III free agent Kip Miller.
- The New York Islanders' ninth-round pick went to the Florida Panthers as the result of an October 11, 2002 trade that sent Sven Butenschon to the Islanders in exchange for Juraj Kolnik and this pick.

== See also ==
- 2003–04 NHL season
