= Doug Doull =

Canadian ice hockey player (born 1974)

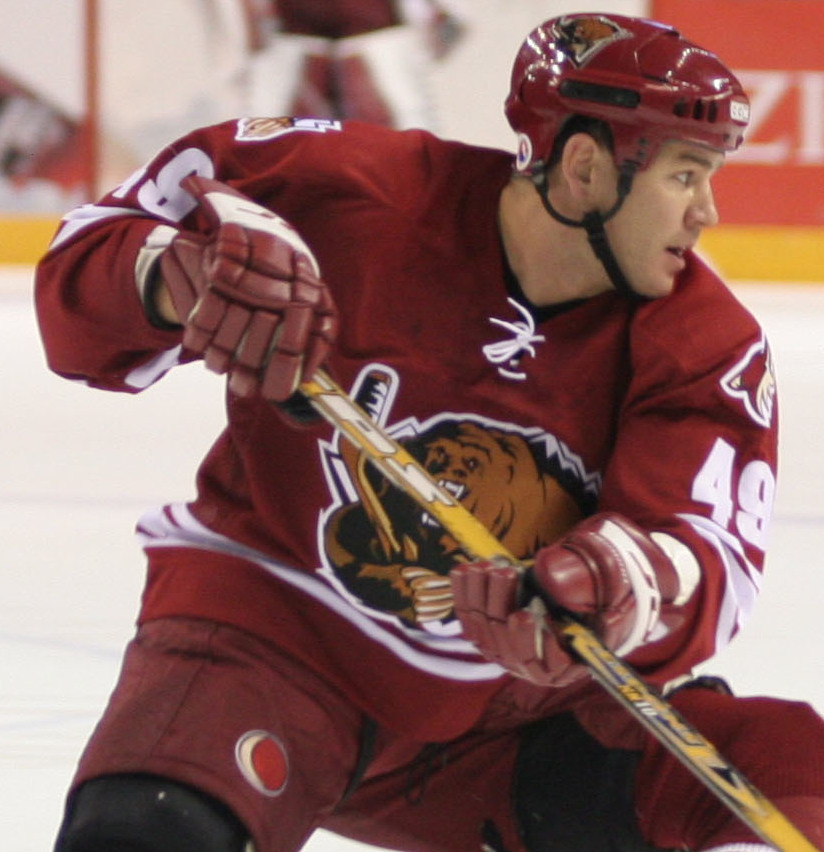
- Doull with the Utah Grizzlies in 2004
- Born: May 31, 1974 (age 52) Glace Bay, Nova Scotia, Canada
- Height: 6 ft 2 in (188 cm)
- Weight: 216 lb (98 kg; 15 st 6 lb)
- Position: Left wing
- Shot: Left
- Played for: Manchester Storm; Boston Bruins; Washington Capitals
- NHL draft: Undrafted
- Playing career: 1998–2006

Doug Doull (born May 31, 1974) is a Canadian former professional ice hockey forward who played 37 games in the National Hockey League (NHL) with the Boston Bruins and Washington Capitals between 2003 and 2006. The rest of his career, which lasted from 1998 to 2006, was spent in the minor leagues.

== Career statistics ==
=== Regular season and playoffs ===
			Regular season					Playoffs
Season	Team	League	GP	G	A	Pts	PIM	GP	G	A	Pts	PIM
1990–91	Wexford Raiders	MetJAHL	39	22	36	58	141	—	—	—	—	—
1992–93	Belleville Bulls	OHL	62	6	11	17	123	5	0	1	1	9
1992–93	Belleville Bulls	OHL	65	19	37	56	143	7	0	2	2	17
1993–94	Belleville Bulls	OHL	62	13	24	37	143	8	1	1	2	23
1994–95	Belleville Bulls	OHL	29	7	12	19	71	16	2	13	15	39
1995–96	Saint Mary's University	CIAU	11	4	4	8	54	—	—	—	—	—
1996–97	Saint Mary's University	CIAU	18	3	10	13	138	—	—	—	—	—
1997–98	Saint Mary's University	CIAU	25	4	11	15	227	—	—	—	—	—
1998–99	Michigan K-Wings	IHL	55	4	11	15	227	3	1	1	2	4
1999–00	Manitoba Moose	IHL	45	4	4	8	184	2	0	0	0	2
1999–00	Detroit Vipers	IHL	17	0	2	2	69	—	—	—	—	—
2000–01	Manchester Storm	BISL	15	1	6	7	51	—	—	—	—	—
2000–01	Saint John Flames	AHL	49	3	10	13	167	16	0	1	1	32
2001–02	St. John's Maple Leafs	AHL	36	5	8	13	166	9	0	1	1	17
2002–03	St. John's Maple Leafs	AHL	70	15	10	25	257	—	—	—	—	—
2003–04	Boston Bruins	NHL	35	0	1	1	132	—	—	—	—	—
2003–04	Providence Bruins	AHL	22	1	0	1	98	—	—	—	—	—
2004–05	Utah Grizzlies	AHL	40	1	1	2	232	—	—	—	—	—
2005–06	San Antonio Rampage	AHL	26	1	2	3	84	—	—	—	—	—
2005–06	Washington Capitals	NHL	2	0	0	0	19	—	—	—	—	—
2005–06	Hershey Bears	AHL	21	1	2	3	117	1	0	0	0	4
AHL totals			264	27	33	60	1121	26	0	2	2	53
NHL totals			37	0	1	1	151	—	—	—	—	—
