= 2003–04 Columbus Blue Jackets season =

National Hockey League season

2003–04 Columbus Blue Jackets
- Division: 4th Central
- Conference: 14th Western
- 2003–04 record: 25–45–8–4
- Home record: 17–18–4–2
- Road record: 8–27–4–2
- Goals for: 177
- Goals against: 238

Team information
- General manager: Doug MacLean
- Coach: Doug MacLean (Oct-Jan); Gerard Gallant (Jan-Apr)
- Captain: Luke Richardson
- Alternate captains: Todd Marchant; Geoff Sanderson (Oct-Mar)
- Arena: Nationwide Arena
- Average attendance: 17,369
- Minor league affiliates: Syracuse Crunch (AHL); Dayton Bombers (ECHL); Elmira Jackals (UHL)

Team leaders
- Goals: Rick Nash (41)
- Assists: David Vyborny (31)
- Points: Rich Nash (57)
- Penalty minutes: Jody Shelley (228)
- Plus/minus: Aaron Johnson (-2)
- Wins: Marc Denis (21)
- Goals against average: Marc Denis (2.56)

The 2003–04 Columbus Blue Jackets season was the Blue Jackets' fourth season in the NHL, as the team was coming off of a 29–42–8–3 record in the 2002–03 season, earning 69 points missed the playoffs for the third year in a row for the first time in franshise history.

== Off-season ==
Columbus would undergo some changes during the off-season, as leading scorer and team captain Ray Whitney would leave to sign with the Detroit Red Wings. The Blue Jackets named veteran defenseman Luke Richardson the third captain in franchise history.

== Regular season ==
The Blue Jackets would get off to a solid start in 2003–04, winning three of their first four games, though the club would eventually go on a seven-game losing streak to quickly fall out of playoff contention. Columbus would continue to struggle, and General Manager and Head Coach Doug MacLean announced on January 1, 2004, that he would step down from head coaching duties, naming Blue Jackets assistant coach and former NHL player Gerard Gallant as his replacement. Columbus posted a 9–21–4–3 record under MacLean. While the Blue Jackets would play better hockey with Gallant behind the bench, the team would fail once again to earn a playoff spot, as they finished the season with a 25–45–8–4 record for 62 points—seven fewer than the previous season—and finish 29 points the Nashville Predators for the eighth and final playoff spot in the Western Conference. Columbus, however, climbed out of the basement in the Central Division for the first time in franchise history after finishing ahead of the Chicago Blackhawks.

Rick Nash had a memorable season, finishing in a three-way tie with Ilya Kovalchuk from the Atlanta Thrashers and Jarome Iginla from the Calgary Flames to win the Maurice "Rocket" Richard Trophy as the League's highest goal-scorer; he scored a club-record 41 goals and finished with a team-best 57 points. David Vyborny led the Blue Jackets with 31 assists and finished second to Nash with 53 points. Rookie Nikolai Zherdev also contributed a solid 34 points in 57 games. On defense, Anders Eriksson led the Jackets with 27 points, while Jaroslav Spacek contributed with 22 points in just 58 games. Jody Shelley provided the team toughness, earning a team-high 228 penalty minutes.

In goal, Marc Denis was the team's number one, playing a team-high 66 games, winning 21 of them, posting a team best 2.56 goals against average (GAA) and earning five shutouts.

The Blue Jackets would finish the season having tied the Dallas Stars for most times shut-out, with 11.

=== Season standings ===
Central Division
No.	CR		GP	W	L	T	OTL	GF	GA	Pts
1	1	**Detroit Red Wings**	82	48	21	11	2	255	189	109
2	7	**St. Louis Blues**	82	39	30	11	2	191	198	91
3	8	**Nashville Predators**	82	38	29	11	4	216	217	91
4	14	Columbus Blue Jackets	82	25	45	8	4	177	238	62
5	15	Chicago Blackhawks	82	20	43	11	8	188	259	59

Note: CR = Conference rank; GP = Games played; W = Wins; L = Losses; T = Ties; OTL = Overtime loss; GF = Goals for; GA = Goals against; Pts = Points
Bolded teams qualified for the playoffs.

Western Conference
R		Div	GP	W	L	T	OTL	GF	GA	Pts
**1**	**P-** Detroit Red Wings	**CE**	**82**	**48**	**21**	**11**	**2**	**255**	**189**	109
**2**	**Y-** San Jose Sharks	**PA**	**82**	**43**	**21**	**12**	**6**	**255**	**183**	104
**3**	**Y-** Vancouver Canucks	**NW**	**82**	**43**	**24**	**10**	**5**	**235**	**194**	101
**4**	**X-** Colorado Avalanche	**NW**	**82**	**40**	**22**	**13**	**7**	**236**	**198**	100
**5**	**X-** Dallas Stars	**PA**	**82**	**41**	**26**	**13**	**2**	**194**	**175**	97
**6**	**X-** Calgary Flames	**NW**	**82**	**42**	**30**	**7**	**3**	**200**	**176**	94
**7**	**X-** St. Louis Blues	**CE**	**82**	**39**	**30**	**11**	**2**	**191**	**198**	91
**8**	**X-** Nashville Predators	**CE**	**82**	**38**	**29**	**11**	**4**	**216**	**217**	91
8.5
9	Edmonton Oilers	NW	82	36	29	12	5	221	208	89
10	Minnesota Wild	NW	82	30	29	20	3	188	183	83
11	Los Angeles Kings	PA	82	28	29	16	9	205	217	81
12	Mighty Ducks of Anaheim	PA	82	29	35	10	8	184	213	76
13	Phoenix Coyotes	PA	82	22	36	18	6	188	245	68
14	Columbus Blue Jackets	CE	82	25	45	8	4	177	238	62
15	Chicago Blackhawks	CE	82	20	43	11	8	188	259	59

Divisions: CE – Central, PA – Pacific, NW – Northwest

P – Clinched Presidents Trophy; Y – Clinched division; X – Clinched playoff spot

== Schedule and results ==
2003–04 regular season
October: 3–6–0–1 (home: 3–2–0–0; road: 0–4–0–1)

Game	Date	Visitor	Score	Home	Record	Pts	Recap
1	October 9	Columbus Blue Jackets	1–2	Atlanta Thrashers	0–1–0–0	0	L
2	October 11	New York Rangers	0–5	Columbus Blue Jackets	1–1–0–0	2	W
3	October 13	Vancouver Canucks	2–3	Columbus Blue Jackets	2–1–0–0	4	W
4	October 16	Chicago Blackhawks	1–2	Columbus Blue Jackets	3–1–0–0	6	W
5	October 18	Columbus Blue Jackets	2–3	Nashville Predators	3–2–0–0	6	L
6	October 22	Columbus Blue Jackets	1–4	Detroit Red Wings	3–3–0–0	6	L
7	October 23	Tampa Bay Lightning	1–0	Columbus Blue Jackets	3–4–0–0	6	L
8	October 25	Dallas Stars	3–2	Columbus Blue Jackets	3–5–0–0	6	L
9	October 28	Columbus Blue Jackets	3–6	Vancouver Canucks	3–6–0–0	6	L
10	October 30	Columbus Blue Jackets	3–4	Edmonton Oilers	3–6–0–1	7	OTL

November: 4–6–3–0 (home: 4–2–2–0; road: 0–4–1–0)

Game	Date	Visitor	Score	Home	Record	Pts	Recap
11	November 1	Columbus Blue Jackets	0–3	Calgary Flames	3–7–0–1	7	L
12	November 7	Atlanta Thrashers	2–4	Columbus Blue Jackets	4–7–0–1	9	W
13	November 9	Calgary Flames	3–4	Columbus Blue Jackets	5–7–0–1	11	W
14	November 11	Columbus Blue Jackets	1–1	Montreal Canadiens	5–7–1–1	12	T
15	November 13	Columbus Blue Jackets	2–5	Ottawa Senators	5–8–1–1	12	L
16	November 14	Boston Bruins	4–0	Columbus Blue Jackets	5–9–1–1	12	L
17	November 16	Phoenix Coyotes	2–2	Columbus Blue Jackets	5–9–2–1	13	T
18	November 19	Columbus Blue Jackets	1–5	Detroit Red Wings	5–10–2–1	13	L
19	November 20	Detroit Red Wings	0–3	Columbus Blue Jackets	6–10–2–1	15	W
20	November 22	New York Islanders	1–2	Columbus Blue Jackets	7–10–2–1	17	W
21	November 25	Edmonton Oilers	3–3	Columbus Blue Jackets	7–10–3–1	18	T
22	November 26	Columbus Blue Jackets	2–4	Nashville Predators	7–11–3–1	18	L
23	November 29	Washington Capitals	5–3	Columbus Blue Jackets	7–12–3–1	18	L

December: 2–9–1–2 (home: 1–6–1–1; road: 1–3–0–1)

Game	Date	Visitor	Score	Home	Record	Pts	Recap
24	December 2	Mighty Ducks of Anaheim	1–2	Columbus Blue Jackets	8–12–3–1	20	W
25	December 4	Nashville Predators	4–2	Columbus Blue Jackets	8–13–3–1	20	L
26	December 6	Columbus Blue Jackets	1–5	Colorado Avalanche	8–14–3–1	20	L
27	December 10	Philadelphia Flyers	1–1	Columbus Blue Jackets	8–14–4–1	21	T
28	December 12	St. Louis Blues	3–2	Columbus Blue Jackets	8–14–4–2	22	OTL
29	December 13	Columbus Blue Jackets	3–5	Pittsburgh Penguins	8–15–4–2	22	L
30	December 16	Columbus Blue Jackets	1–2	St. Louis Blues	8–15–4–3	23	OTL
31	December 19	Calgary Flames	2–1	Columbus Blue Jackets	8–16–4–3	23	L
32	December 20	Columbus Blue Jackets	2–5	Minnesota Wild	8–17–4–3	23	L
33	December 23	Phoenix Coyotes	2–1	Columbus Blue Jackets	8–18–4–3	23	L
34	December 26	Columbus Blue Jackets	4–1	Chicago Blackhawks	9–18–4–3	25	W
35	December 27	Dallas Stars	4–3	Columbus Blue Jackets	9–19–4–3	25	L
36	December 29	St. Louis Blues	3–2	Columbus Blue Jackets	9–20–4–3	25	L
37	December 31	San Jose Sharks	1–0	Columbus Blue Jackets	9–21–4–3	25	L

January: 6–6–3–0 (home: 4–2–1–0; road: 2–4–2–0)

Game	Date	Visitor	Score	Home	Record	Pts	Recap
38	January 2	Columbus Blue Jackets	2–0	Tampa Bay Lightning	10–21–4–3	27	W
39	January 3	Columbus Blue Jackets	0–1	Florida Panthers	10–22–4–3	27	L
40	January 6	Columbus Blue Jackets	0–6	Colorado Avalanche	10–23–4–3	27	L
41	January 8	Columbus Blue Jackets	3–2	San Jose Sharks	11–23–4–3	29	W
42	January 10	Columbus Blue Jackets	2–2	Los Angeles Kings	11–23–5–3	30	T
43	January 11	Columbus Blue Jackets	2–2	Mighty Ducks of Anaheim	11–23–6–3	31	T
44	January 15	Columbus Blue Jackets	3–5	St. Louis Blues	11–24–6–3	31	L
45	January 16	Los Angeles Kings	2–3	Columbus Blue Jackets	12–24–6–3	33	W
46	January 18	Edmonton Oilers	4–4	Columbus Blue Jackets	12–24–7–3	34	T
47	January 21	St. Louis Blues	1–3	Columbus Blue Jackets	13–24–7–3	36	W
48	January 22	Columbus Blue Jackets	0–7	Chicago Blackhawks	13–25–7–3	36	L
49	January 24	Chicago Blackhawks	3–4	Columbus Blue Jackets	14–25–7–3	38	W
50	January 27	New Jersey Devils	4–3	Columbus Blue Jackets	14–26–7–3	38	L
51	January 29	Nashville Predators	6–4	Columbus Blue Jackets	14–27–7–3	38	L
52	January 31	Minnesota Wild	1–2	Columbus Blue Jackets	15–27–7–3	40	W

February: 4–7–1–1 (home: 3–1–0–1; road: 1–6–1–0)

Game	Date	Visitor	Score	Home	Record	Pts	Recap
53	February 2	Columbus Blue Jackets	3–3	Phoenix Coyotes	15–27–8–3	41	T
54	February 4	Columbus Blue Jackets	0–1	Dallas Stars	15–28–8–3	41	L
55	February 11	Los Angeles Kings	2–3	Columbus Blue Jackets	16–28–8–3	43	W
56	February 12	Columbus Blue Jackets	1–4	Toronto Maple Leafs	16–29–8–3	43	L
57	February 14	San Jose Sharks	2–1	Columbus Blue Jackets	16–29–8–4	44	OTL
58	February 16	Nashville Predators	2–4	Columbus Blue Jackets	17–29–8–4	46	W
59	February 18	Columbus Blue Jackets	1–3	Mighty Ducks of Anaheim	17–30–8–4	46	L
60	February 20	Columbus Blue Jackets	2–3	Phoenix Coyotes	17–31–8–4	46	L
61	February 21	Columbus Blue Jackets	3–4	Los Angeles Kings	17–32–8–4	46	L
62	February 23	Columbus Blue Jackets	2–4	San Jose Sharks	17–33–8–4	46	L
63	February 25	Chicago Blackhawks	4–3	Columbus Blue Jackets	17–34–8–4	46	L
64	February 27	Columbus Blue Jackets	4–3	Chicago Blackhawks	18–34–8–4	48	W
65	February 28	Colorado Avalanche	4–5	Columbus Blue Jackets	19–34–8–4	50	W

March: 5–10–0–0 (home: 2–4–0–0; road: 3–6–0–0)

Game	Date	Visitor	Score	Home	Record	Pts	Recap
66	March 2	Columbus Blue Jackets	3–0	Carolina Hurricanes	20–34–8–4	52	W
67	March 3	Columbus Blue Jackets	2–4	Dallas Stars	20–35–8–4	52	L
68	March 6	Vancouver Canucks	4–0	Columbus Blue Jackets	20–36–8–4	52	L
69	March 8	Carolina Hurricanes	4–1	Columbus Blue Jackets	20–37–8–4	52	L
70	March 11	Detroit Red Wings	4–2	Columbus Blue Jackets	20–38–8–4	52	L
71	March 13	Columbus Blue Jackets	3–5	St. Louis Blues	20–39–8–4	52	L
72	March 14	Columbus Blue Jackets	2–3	Minnesota Wild	20–40–8–4	52	L
73	March 16	Columbus Blue Jackets	2–3	Edmonton Oilers	20–41–8–4	52	L
74	March 18	Columbus Blue Jackets	0–2	Calgary Flames	20–42–8–4	52	L
75	March 21	Columbus Blue Jackets	5–4	Vancouver Canucks	21–42–8–4	54	W
76	March 24	Minnesota Wild	0–2	Columbus Blue Jackets	22–42–8–4	56	W
77	March 26	Mighty Ducks of Anaheim	1–3	Columbus Blue Jackets	23–42–8–4	58	W
78	March 27	Columbus Blue Jackets	3–2	Nashville Predators	24–42–8–4	60	W
79	March 29	Columbus Blue Jackets	0–6	Buffalo Sabres	24–43–8–4	60	L
80	March 31	Detroit Red Wings	3–2	Columbus Blue Jackets	24–44–8–4	60	L

April: 1–1–0–0 (home: 0–1–0–0; road: 1–0–0–0)

Game	Date	Visitor	Score	Home	Record	Pts	Recap
81	April 2	Colorado Avalanche	4–2	Columbus Blue Jackets	24–45–8–4	60	L
82	April 3	Columbus Blue Jackets	4–1	Detroit Red Wings	25–45–8–4	62	W

Legend: W Win (2 points) L Loss (0 points) T Tie (1 point) OTL Overtime loss (1 point)

== Player statistics ==
=== Scoring ===
- Position abbreviations: C = Center; D = Defense; G = Goaltender; LW = Left wing; RW = Right wing
- † = Joined team via a transaction (e.g., trade, waivers, signing) during the season. Stats reflect time with the Blue Jackets only.
- ‡ = Left team via a transaction (e.g., trade, waivers, release) during the season. Stats reflect time with the Blue Jackets only.

No.	Player	Pos	Regular season					
No.	Player	Pos	GP	G	A	Pts	+/-	PIM
61	Rick Nash	LW	80	41	16	57	−35	87
9	David Vyborny	RW	82	22	31	53	−26	40
13	Nikolai Zherdev	RW	57	13	21	34	−11	54
26	Todd Marchant	C	77	9	25	34	−17	34
10	Trevor Letowski	RW	73	15	17	32	−12	16
8	Geoff Sanderson‡	LW	67	13	16	29	−9	34
2	Anders Eriksson†	D	66	7	20	27	−6	18
25	Andrew Cassels	C	58	6	20	26	−24	26
27	Manny Malhotra†	C	56	12	13	25	−5	24
3	Jaroslav Spacek	D	58	5	17	22	−13	45
28	Tyler Wright	C	68	9	9	18	−19	63
5	Darryl Sydor‡	D	49	2	13	15	−19	26
44	Rostislav Klesla	D	47	2	11	13	−16	27
20	Lasse Pirjeta‡	C	57	2	8	10	−6	20
23	Derrick Walser	D	27	1	8	9	−6	22
47	Aaron Johnson	D	29	2	6	8	−2	32
16	Alexander Svitov†	C	29	2	6	8	−8	16
15	Duvie Westcott	D	34	0	7	7	−15	39
45	Jody Shelley	LW	76	3	3	6	−10	228
22	Luke Richardson	D	64	1	5	6	−11	48
42	Mark Hartigan	C	9	1	3	4	−2	6
21	Espen Knutsen‡	C	14	0	4	4	−5	2
7	Scott Lachance	D	77	0	4	4	−23	44
46	Tim Jackman	RW	19	1	2	3	−7	16
17	David Ling	RW	50	1	2	3	−3	98
32	Kent McDonell	RW	29	1	2	3	−7	36
38	Andrej Nedorost	LW	9	2	0	2	0	6
41	Brad Moran	C	2	1	1	2	−1	2
30	Marc Denis	G	66	0	2	2		10
24	Todd Rohloff‡	D	24	0	2	2	−12	8
49	Dan Fritsche	C	19	1	0	1	−5	12
19	Brian Holzinger†	C	13	1	0	1	−4	2
36	Don MacLean	C	4	1	0	1	−1	0
33	Jeremy Reich	LW	9	0	1	1	−3	20
37	Darrel Scoville	D	8	0	1	1	−4	6
40	Fred Brathwaite	G	21	0	0	0		2
34	Jean-Luc Grand-Pierre‡	D	16	0	0	0	−3	12
18	Zenith Komarniski†	D	2	0	0	0	0	0
31	Pascal Leclaire	G	2	0	0	0		0
14	Greg Mauldin	C	6	0	0	0	−2	4
19	Joe Motzko	RW	2	0	0	0	0	0
39	Mike Pandolfo	LW	3	0	0	0	−2	0
6	Jamie Pushor†‡	D	7	0	0	0	−2	2

=== Goaltending ===
No.	Player	Regular season									
No.	Player	GP	W	L	T	SA	GA	GAA	SV%	SO	TOI
30	Marc Denis	66	21	36	7	1970	162	2.56	.918	5	3796
40	Fred Brathwaite	21	4	11	1	574	59	3.37	.897	0	1050
31	Pascal Leclaire	2	0	2	0	69	7	3.53	.899	0	119

== Awards and records ==
=== Awards ===
Type	Award/honor	Recipient	Ref
League (annual)	Maurice "Rocket" Richard Trophy	Rick Nash (Note: Shared with Ilya Kovalchuk of the Atlanta Thrashers and Jarome Iginla of the Calgary Flames)	
League (in-season)	NHL All-Star Game selection	Rick Nash	
League (in-season)	NHL Offensive Player of the Week	David Vyborny (March 1)	
League (in-season)	NHL YoungStars Game selection	Nikolay Zherdev	
Team	Foundation Community Service Award	Luke Richardson	
Team	Three Stars Award	Rick Nash	

=== Milestones ===
Milestone	Player	Date	Ref
First game	Dan Fritsche	October 9, 2003	
First game	Aaron Johnson	December 2, 2003	
First game	Nikolay Zherdev	December 2, 2003	
First game	Tim Jackman	December 20, 2003	
First game	Jeremy Reich	January 21, 2004	
First game	Joe Motzko	February 2, 2004	
First game	Pascal Leclaire	February 20, 2004	
First game	Greg Mauldin	March 26, 2004	
First game	Mike Pandolfo	March 26, 2004	

== Transactions ==
The Blue Jackets were involved in the following transactions from June 10, 2003, the day after the deciding game of the 2003 Stanley Cup Finals, through June 7, 2004, the day of the deciding game of the 2004 Stanley Cup Finals.

=== Trades ===
Date	Details		Ref
June 22, 2003	To Carolina Hurricanes: 4th-round pick in 2004	To Columbus Blue Jackets: 5th-round pick in 2003; 6th-round pick in 2003	
June 22, 2003	To Los Angeles Kings: 9th-round pick in 2004	To Columbus Blue Jackets: 9th-round pick in 2003	
July 22, 2003	To Dallas Stars: Mike Sillinger; 2nd-round pick in 2004	To Columbus Blue Jackets: Darryl Sydor	
October 3, 2003	To Boston Bruins: Travis Green	To Columbus Blue Jackets: 6th-round pick in 2004	
October 30, 2003	To Vancouver Canucks: Sean Pronger	To Columbus Blue Jackets: Zenith Komarniski	
December 31, 2003	To Atlanta Thrashers: Jean-Luc Grand-Pierre	To Columbus Blue Jackets: Future considerations	
January 23, 2004	To New York Rangers: Jamie Pushor	To Columbus Blue Jackets: 8th-round pick in 2004	
January 27, 2004	To Tampa Bay Lightning: Darryl Sydor; 4th-round pick in 2004	To Columbus Blue Jackets: Alexander Svitov; 3rd-round pick in 2004	
February 10, 2004	To Pittsburgh Penguins: Pauli Levokari	To Columbus Blue Jackets: Brendan Buckley	
March 9, 2004	To Pittsburgh Penguins: Lasse Pirjeta	To Columbus Blue Jackets: Brian Holzinger	
March 9, 2004	To Vancouver Canucks: Geoff Sanderson	To Columbus Blue Jackets: 3rd-round pick in 2004	

=== Players acquired ===
Date	Player	Former team	Term	Via	Ref
July 3, 2003	Trevor Letowski	Vancouver Canucks	multi-year	Free agency	
July 3, 2003	Todd Marchant	Edmonton Oilers	multi-year	Free agency	
July 15, 2003	Mark Hartigan	Atlanta Thrashers	1-year	Free agency	
September 5, 2003	Todd Rohloff	Washington Capitals	1-year	Free agency	
October 3, 2003	Travis Green	Toronto Maple Leafs		Waiver draft	
October 10, 2003	Anders Eriksson	Toronto Maple Leafs	1-year	Free agency	
November 21, 2003	Manny Malhotra	Dallas Stars		Waivers	
December 10, 2003	Jamie Pushor	Syracuse Crunch (AHL)	1-year	Free agency	
April 12, 2004	Prestin Ryan	University of Maine (HE)	1-year	Free agency	
April 19, 2004	Brandon Sugden	Syracuse Crunch (AHL)	1-year (Note: Club option for a second year.)	Free agency	

=== Players lost ===
Date	Player	New team	Via (Note: In parentheses is the player's free agency group on July 1 if applicable.)	Ref
July 1, 2003	Radim Bicanek (Note: Bicanek was inactive during the 2003–04 season.)		Contract expiration (UFA)	
July 1, 2003	Jean-Francois Labbe	HC Lada Togliatti (RSL)	Free agency (VI)	
July 1, 2003	Jonathan Schill (Note: Schill retired.)		Contract expiration (UFA)	
July 7, 2003	Darren Van Impe	Hamburg Freezers (DEL)	Free agency (UFA)	
July 15, 2003	Matt Davidson	Calgary Flames	Free agency (VI)	
July 29, 2003	Ray Whitney	Detroit Red Wings	Free agency (III)	
August 9, 2003	Paul Manning	Hamburg Freezers (DEL)	Free agency (II) (Note: Columbus retained Manning’s NHL rights through the 2006–07 season.)	
September 10, 2003	Jamie Allison	Nashville Predators	Free agency (UFA)	
September 10, 2003	Mathieu Darche	Nashville Predators	Free agency (VI)	
October 3, 2003	Petr Tenkrat	Toronto Maple Leafs	Waiver draft	
October 9, 2003	Dan Watson	Providence Bruins (AHL)	Free agency (UFA)	
October 10, 2003	Blake Bellefeuille	Providence Bruins (AHL)	Free agency (VI)	
December 16, 2003	Espen Knutsen	Valerenga (Norway) (Note: Knutsen signed with Valerenga on December 17.)	Buyout	
January 9, 2004	Todd Rohloff	Washington Capitals	Waivers	
May 12, 2004	Derrick Walser	Eisbaren Berlin (DEL)	Free agency (Note: Columbus retained Walser’s NHL rights until trading them to the Carolina Hurricanes on July 30, 2005.)	

=== Signings ===
Date	Player	Term	Contract type	Ref
June 12, 2003	Pauli Levokari	1-year	Re-signing	
June 12, 2003	Donald MacLean	1-year	Re-signing	
July 1, 2003	Andrew Cassels	multi-year	Re-signing	
July 15, 2003	Aleksandr Guskov	multi-year	Entry-level	
July 18, 2003	Darrel Scoville		Re-signing	
July 18, 2003	Derrick Walser		Re-signing	
July 24, 2003	David Ling		Re-signing	
July 24, 2003	Brad Moran		Re-signing	
August 13, 2003	Kent McDonell		Re-signing	
August 13, 2003	Jeremy Reich		Re-signing	
August 15, 2003	Nikolay Zherdev	multi-year	Entry-level	
August 26, 2003	Karl Goehring		Re-signing	
October 6, 2003	Dan Fritsche	multi-year	Entry-level	
March 19, 2004	Steven Goertzen	multi-year	Entry-level	
April 19, 2004	Greg Mauldin	multi-year	Entry-level	
May 26, 2004	Jody Shelley	2-year	Re-signing	
June 1, 2004	Tim Konsorada	multi-year	Entry-level	
June 1, 2004	Ole-Kristian Tollefsen	multi-year	Entry-level	

== Draft picks ==
Columbus' draft picks at the 2003 NHL entry draft held at the Gaylord Entertainment Center in Nashville, Tennessee.

Round	#	Player	Nationality	College/Junior/Club team (League)
1	4	Nikolai Zherdev	Russia	CSKA Moscow (Russia)
2	46	Dan Fritsche	United States	Sarnia Sting (OHL)
3	71	Dmitri Kosmachev	Russia	CSKA Moscow (Russia)
4	103	Kevin Jarman	Canada	Stouffville Spirit (OPJHL)
4	104	Philippe Dupuis	Canada	Hull Olympiques (QMJHL)
5	138	Arsi Piispanen	Finland	Jokerit (Finland)
6	168	Marc Methot	Canada	London Knights (OHL)
7	200	Alexander Guskov	Russia	Lokomotiv Yaroslavl (Russia)
8	233	Mathieu Gravel	Canada	Shawinigan Cataractes (QMJHL)
9	283	Trevor Hendrikx	Canada	Peterborough Petes (OHL)
