= 2003–04 Atlanta Thrashers season =

National Hockey League team season

2003–04 Atlanta Thrashers
- Division: 2nd Southeast
- Conference: 10th Eastern
- 2003–04 record: 33–37–8–4
- Home record: 18–17–4–2
- Road record: 15–20–4–2
- Goals for: 214
- Goals against: 243

Team information
- General manager: Don Waddell
- Coach: Bob Hartley
- Captain: Shawn McEachern
- Alternate captains: Dany Heatley; Vyacheslav Kozlov
- Arena: Philips Arena
- Average attendance: 15,121
- Minor league affiliates: Chicago Wolves; Gwinnett Gladiators

Team leaders
- Goals: Ilya Kovalchuk (41)
- Assists: Ilya Kovalchuk (46)
- Points: Ilya Kovalchuk (87)
- Penalty minutes: Francis Lessard (181)
- Plus/minus: Shawn McEachern (+5)
- Wins: Pasi Nurminen (25)
- Goals against average: Pasi Nurminen (2.78)

The 2003–04 Atlanta Thrashers season was the 22nd season of play for the National Hockey League franchise that was established on June 22, 1979, and 29th season for the organization overall.

== Regular season ==
=== Final standings ===
Southeast Division
No.	CR		GP	W	L	T	OTL	GF	GA	PTS
1	1	**Tampa Bay Lightning**	82	46	22	8	6	245	192	106
2	10	Atlanta Thrashers	82	33	37	8	4	214	243	78
3	11	Carolina Hurricanes	82	28	34	14	6	172	209	76
4	12	Florida Panthers	82	28	35	15	4	188	221	75
5	14	Washington Capitals	82	23	46	10	3	186	253	59

Note: CR = Conference rank; GP = Games played; W = Wins; L = Losses; T = Ties; OTL = Overtime loss; GF = Goals for; GA = Goals against; Pts = Points
Bolded teams qualified for the playoffs.

Eastern Conference
R		Div	GP	W	L	T	OTL	GF	GA	Pts
**1**	**Z-** Tampa Bay Lightning	**SE**	**82**	**46**	**22**	**8**	**6**	**245**	**192**	106
**2**	**Y-** Boston Bruins	**NE**	**82**	**41**	**19**	**15**	**7**	**209**	**188**	104
**3**	**Y-** Philadelphia Flyers	**AT**	**82**	**40**	**21**	**15**	**6**	**209**	**188**	101
**4**	**X-** Toronto Maple Leafs	**NE**	**82**	**45**	**24**	**10**	**3**	**242**	**204**	103
**5**	**X-** Ottawa Senators	**NE**	**82**	**43**	**23**	**10**	**6**	**262**	**189**	102
**6**	**X-** New Jersey Devils	**AT**	**82**	**43**	**25**	**12**	**2**	**213**	**164**	100
**7**	**X-** Montreal Canadiens	**NE**	**82**	**41**	**30**	**7**	**4**	**208**	**192**	93
**8**	**X-** New York Islanders	**AT**	**82**	**38**	**29**	**11**	**4**	**237**	**210**	91
8.5
9	Buffalo Sabres	NE	82	37	34	7	4	220	221	85
10	Atlanta Thrashers	SE	82	33	37	8	4	214	243	78
11	Carolina Hurricanes	SE	82	28	34	14	6	172	209	76
12	Florida Panthers	SE	82	28	35	15	4	188	221	75
13	New York Rangers	AT	82	27	40	7	8	206	250	69
14	Washington Capitals	SE	82	23	46	10	3	186	253	59
15	Pittsburgh Penguins	AT	82	23	47	8	4	190	303	58

Divisions: AT – Atlantic, NE – Northeast, SE – Southeast

Z – Clinched conference; Y – Clinched division; X – Clinched playoff spot

== Schedule and results ==
2003–04 regular season
October: 5–3–2–1 (home: 3–1–1–0; road: 2–2–1–1)

Game	Date	Score	Opponent	Record	Recap
1	October 9, 2003	2–1	Columbus Blue Jackets (2003–04)	1–0–0–0	W
2	October 11, 2003	4–3	@ Washington Capitals (2003–04)	2–0–0–0	W
3	October 14, 2003	2–2 OT	New York Islanders (2003–04)	2–0–1–0	T
4	October 16, 2003	0–0 OT	@ New York Rangers (2003–04)	2–0–2–0	T
5	October 18, 2003	7–2	Chicago Blackhawks (2003–04)	3–0–2–0	W
6	October 21, 2003	2–3 OT	@ Tampa Bay Lightning (2003–04)	3–0–2–1	OTL
7	October 23, 2003	4–2	Nashville Predators (2003–04)	4–0–2–1	W
8	October 25, 2003	2–3	Florida Panthers (2003–04)	4–1–2–1	L
9	October 27, 2003	3–2 OT	@ Toronto Maple Leafs (2003–04)	5–1–2–1	W
10	October 30, 2003	2–3	@ Minnesota Wild (2003–04)	5–2–2–1	L
11	October 31, 2003	1–2	@ Washington Capitals (2003–04)	5–3–2–1	L

November: 7–6–1–0 (home: 4–3–1–0; road: 3–3–0–0)

Game	Date	Score	Opponent	Record	Recap
12	November 2, 2003	2–2 OT	San Jose Sharks (2003–04)	5–3–3–1	T
13	November 5, 2003	7–4	@ Buffalo Sabres (2003–04)	6–3–3–1	W
14	November 7, 2003	2–4	@ Columbus Blue Jackets (2003–04)	6–4–3–1	L
15	November 8, 2003	4–3	@ New York Islanders (2003–04)	7–4–3–1	W
16	November 11, 2003	3–5	Ottawa Senators (2003–04)	7–5–3–1	L
17	November 13, 2003	1–5	@ Carolina Hurricanes (2003–04)	7–6–3–1	L
18	November 15, 2003	0–4	@ Philadelphia Flyers (2003–04)	7–7–3–1	L
19	November 16, 2003	5–2	Florida Panthers (2003–04)	8–7–3–1	W
20	November 19, 2003	5–4 OT	Boston Bruins (2003–04)	9–7–3–1	W
21	November 21, 2003	6–3	@ Florida Panthers (2003–04)	10–7–3–1	W
22	November 23, 2003	1–0	Phoenix Coyotes (2003–04)	11–7–3–1	W
23	November 25, 2003	3–6	Ottawa Senators (2003–04)	11–8–3–1	L
24	November 27, 2003	1–3	Toronto Maple Leafs (2003–04)	11–9–3–1	L
25	November 29, 2003	2–1	Tampa Bay Lightning (2003–04)	12–9–3–1	W

December: 7–7–0–1 (home: 5–4–0–0; road: 2–3–0–1)

Game	Date	Score	Opponent	Record	Recap
26	December 1, 2003	3–4	@ Pittsburgh Penguins (2003–04)	12–10–3–1	L
27	December 3, 2003	4–6	Boston Bruins (2003–04)	12–11–3–1	L
28	December 5, 2003	6–2	Mighty Ducks of Anaheim (2003–04)	13–11–3–1	W
29	December 6, 2003	4–3 OT	@ Florida Panthers (2003–04)	14–11–3–1	W
30	December 10, 2003	4–3 OT	Los Angeles Kings (2003–04)	15–11–3–1	W
31	December 12, 2003	6–3	Pittsburgh Penguins (2003–04)	16–11–3–1	W
32	December 13, 2003	0–4	@ New York Islanders (2003–04)	16–12–3–1	L
33	December 16, 2003	0–5	Washington Capitals (2003–04)	16–13–3–1	L
34	December 18, 2003	0–3	New Jersey Devils (2003–04)	16–14–3–1	L
35	December 20, 2003	7–4	@ Pittsburgh Penguins (2003–04)	17–14–3–1	W
36	December 21, 2003	4–1	Philadelphia Flyers (2003–04)	18–14–3–1	W
37	December 26, 2003	3–1	Tampa Bay Lightning (2003–04)	19–14–3–1	W
38	December 28, 2003	2–5	@ Ottawa Senators (2003–04)	19–15–3–1	L
39	December 29, 2003	1–2	Montreal Canadiens (2003–04)	19–16–3–1	L
40	December 31, 2003	5–6 OT	@ Detroit Red Wings (2003–04)	19–16–3–2	OTL

January: 2–9–3–0 (home: 1–4–2–0; road: 1–5–1–0)

Game	Date	Score	Opponent	Record	Recap
41	January 3, 2004	1–5	@ Montreal Canadiens (2003–04)	19–17–3–2	L
42	January 8, 2004	1–2	@ Dallas Stars (2003–04)	19–18–3–2	L
43	January 10, 2004	2–5	@ San Jose Sharks (2003–04)	19–19–3–2	L
44	January 11, 2004	1–1 OT	@ Phoenix Coyotes (2003–04)	19–19–4–2	T
45	January 14, 2004	1–2	Montreal Canadiens (2003–04)	19–20–4–2	L
46	January 16, 2004	3–4	Carolina Hurricanes (2003–04)	19–21–4–2	L
47	January 18, 2004	5–2	@ Carolina Hurricanes (2003–04)	20–21–4–2	W
48	January 20, 2004	4–1	Buffalo Sabres (2003–04)	21–21–4–2	W
49	January 22, 2004	1–1 OT	Colorado Avalanche (2003–04)	21–21–5–2	T
50	January 24, 2004	0–3	New York Islanders (2003–04)	21–22–5–2	L
51	January 25, 2004	2–3	@ New Jersey Devils (2003–04)	21–23–5–2	L
52	January 28, 2004	1–1 OT	St. Louis Blues (2003–04)	21–23–6–2	T
53	January 30, 2004	1–4	Toronto Maple Leafs (2003–04)	21–24–6–2	L
54	January 31, 2004	2–5	@ Tampa Bay Lightning (2003–04)	21–25–6–2	L

February: 5–7–0–0 (home: 1–2–0–0; road: 4–5–0–0)

Game	Date	Score	Opponent	Record	Recap
55	February 3, 2004	4–5	@ Boston Bruins (2003–04)	21–26–6–2	L
56	February 5, 2004	1–5	Philadelphia Flyers (2003–04)	21–27–6–2	L
57	February 10, 2004	2–5	@ Calgary Flames (2003–04)	21–28–6–2	L
58	February 11, 2004	1–5	@ Edmonton Oilers (2003–04)	21–29–6–2	L
59	February 13, 2004	4–1	@ Vancouver Canucks (2003–04)	22–29–6–2	W
60	February 16, 2004	2–7	@ Buffalo Sabres (2003–04)	22–30–6–2	L
61	February 17, 2004	4–1	@ Montreal Canadiens (2003–04)	23–30–6–2	W
62	February 19, 2004	3–2 OT	@ Ottawa Senators (2003–04)	24–30–6–2	W
63	February 21, 2004	4–5	@ Philadelphia Flyers (2003–04)	24–31–6–2	L
64	February 25, 2004	2–4	Tampa Bay Lightning (2003–04)	24–32–6–2	L
65	February 27, 2004	3–2	@ New Jersey Devils (2003–04)	25–32–6–2	W
66	February 29, 2004	3–2	New York Rangers (2003–04)	26–32–6–2	W

March: 6–4–2–2 (home: 4–2–0–2; road: 2–2–2–0)

Game	Date	Score	Opponent	Record	Recap
67	March 2, 2004	4–3	@ New York Rangers (2003–04)	27–32–6–2	W
68	March 5, 2004	2–3 OT	Carolina Hurricanes (2003–04)	27–32–6–3	OTL
69	March 6, 2004	2–2 OT	@ Boston Bruins (2003–04)	27–32–7–3	T
70	March 9, 2004	0–2	New York Rangers (2003–04)	27–33–7–3	L
71	March 12, 2004	2–4	@ Carolina Hurricanes (2003–04)	27–34–7–3	L
72	March 13, 2004	5–2	Washington Capitals (2003–04)	28–34–7–3	W
73	March 15, 2004	1–0 OT	Carolina Hurricanes (2003–04)	29–34–7–3	W
74	March 17, 2004	3–4 OT	Buffalo Sabres (2003–04)	29–34–7–4	OTL
75	March 19, 2004	3–2	Florida Panthers (2003–04)	30–34–7–4	W
76	March 20, 2004	2–2 OT	@ Washington Capitals (2003–04)	30–34–8–4	T
77	March 24, 2004	3–2	Washington Capitals (2003–04)	31–34–8–4	W
78	March 26, 2004	0–5	New Jersey Devils (2003–04)	31–35–8–4	L
79	March 27, 2004	3–0	@ Florida Panthers (2003–04)	32–35–8–4	W
80	March 29, 2004	2–4	@ Toronto Maple Leafs (2003–04)	32–36–8–4	L

April: 1–1–0–0 (home: 0–1–0–0; road: 1–0–0–0)

Game	Date	Score	Opponent	Record	Recap
81	April 2, 2004	2–3	Pittsburgh Penguins (2003–04)	32–37–8–4	L
82	April 3, 2004	2–1	@ Tampa Bay Lightning (2003–04)	33–37–8–4	W

Legend: W Win (2 points) L Loss (0 points) T Tie (1 point) OTL Overtime loss (1 point)

== Player statistics ==
=== Scoring ===
- Position abbreviations: C = Center; D = Defense; G = Goaltender; LW = Left wing; RW = Right wing
- † = Joined team via a transaction (e.g., trade, waivers, signing) during the season. Stats reflect time with the Thrashers only.
- ‡ = Left team via a transaction (e.g., trade, waivers, release) during the season. Stats reflect time with the Thrashers only.

No.	Player	Pos	Regular season					
No.	Player	Pos	GP	G	A	Pts	+/-	PIM
17	Ilya Kovalchuk	LW	81	41	46	87	−10	63
19	Shawn McEachern	RW	82	17	38	55	5	76
13	Vyacheslav Kozlov	LW	76	20	32	52	−12	74
9	Marc Savard	C	45	19	33	52	−8	85
27	Patrik Stefan	C	82	14	26	40	−7	26
28	Randy Robitaille	C	69	11	26	37	−12	20
26	Ronald Petrovicky	RW	78	16	15	31	−9	123
8	Frantisek Kaberle	D	67	3	26	29	2	30
15	Dany Heatley	LW	31	13	12	25	−8	18
10	Serge Aubin	LW	66	10	15	25	0	73
16	Jeff Cowan‡	LW	58	9	15	24	2	68
25	Andy Sutton	D	65	8	13	21	0	94
36	Daniel Tjarnqvist	D	68	5	15	20	−4	20
11	J. P. Vigier	RW	70	10	8	18	−18	22
23	Ivan Majesky	D	63	3	7	10	−7	76
38	Yannick Tremblay	D	38	2	8	10	−13	13
2	Garnet Exelby	D	71	1	9	10	−10	134
4	Chris Tamer	D	38	2	5	7	−9	55
39	Jean-Luc Grand-Pierre†‡	D	27	2	2	4	−7	26
6	Shawn Heins	D	17	0	4	4	−1	16
49	Zdenek Blatny	LW	16	3	0	3	0	6
14	Ben Simon†	LW	52	3	0	3	−10	28
24	Tommi Santala	C	33	1	2	3	−7	22
20	Francis Lessard	RW	62	1	1	2	−5	181
31	Pasi Nurminen	G	64	0	2	2		35
41	Daniel Corso†	C	7	0	1	1	−2	0
47	Kurtis Foster	D	3	0	1	1	0	0
41	Simon Gamache‡	C	2	0	1	1	0	0
21	Derek MacKenzie	C	12	0	1	1	0	10
22	Kamil Piros‡	C	14	0	1	1	−3	4
48	Kyle Rossiter†	D	2	0	1	1	1	0
42	Karl Stewart	LW	5	0	1	1	0	4
29	Brian Swanson	C	2	0	1	1	0	0
39	Kip Brennan†	LW	5	0	0	0	0	17
34	Byron Dafoe	G	18	0	0	0		2
5	Tomas Kloucek†	D	37	0	0	0	−8	25
29	Brad Larsen†	LW	6	0	0	0	−2	2
32	Kari Lehtonen	G	4	0	0	0		0
12	Bill Lindsay	RW	24	0	0	0	−6	25
43	Mike Weaver	D	1	0	0	0	−1	0

=== Goaltending ===
No.	Player	Regular season									
No.	Player	GP	W	L	T	SA	GA	GAA	SV%	SO	TOI
31	Pasi Nurminen	64	25	30	7	1792	173	2.78	.903	3	3738
34	Byron Dafoe	18	4	11	1	499	51	3.14	.898	0	973
32	Kari Lehtonen	4	4	0	0	106	5	1.25	.953	1	240

== Awards and records ==
=== Awards ===
Type	Award/honor	Recipient	Ref
League (annual)	NHL Second All-Star Team	Ilya Kovalchuk (Left wing)	
League (annual)	Maurice "Rocket" Richard Trophy	Ilya Kovalchuk (Note: Shared with Jarome Iginla of the Calgary Flames and Rick Nash of the Columbus Blue Jackets)	
League (in-season)	NHL All-Star Game selection	Ilya Kovalchuk (Note: Kovalchuk was voted to the starting lineup, receiving more votes than any other player.)	
League (in-season)	NHL Offensive Player of the Month	Ilya Kovalchuk (October)	
League (in-season)	NHL Offensive Player of the Week	Ilya Kovalchuk (October 20)	
League (in-season)	NHL Offensive Player of the Week	Ilya Kovalchuk (October 27)	
League (in-season)	NHL YoungStars Game selection	Garnet Exelby (Note: Exelby did not play and was replaced by Matt Stajan of the Toronto Maple Leafs.)	
Team	Community Service Award	Andy Sutton	
Team	Dan Snyder Memorial Trophy	Garnet Exelby	
Team	Players' Player Award	Pasi Nurminen	
Team	Team MVP	Ilya Kovalchuk	
Team	Three Stars of the Game Award	Ilya Kovalchuk	

=== Milestones ===
Milestone	Player	Date	Ref
First game	Tommi Santala	October 9, 2003	
First game	Karl Stewart	November 7, 2003	
First game	Kari Lehtonen	March 19, 2004	

== Transactions ==
The Thrashers were involved in the following transactions from June 10, 2003, the day after the deciding game of the 2003 Stanley Cup Final, through June 7, 2004, the day of the deciding game of the 2004 Stanley Cup Final.

=== Trades ===
Date	Details		Ref
June 21, 2003	To Florida Panthers: 2nd-round pick in 2003	To Atlanta Thrashers: Ivan Majesky	
September 15, 2003	To Los Angeles Kings: Milan Hnilicka	To Atlanta Thrashers: Future considerations	
October 3, 2003	To Carolina Hurricanes: 4th-round pick in 2004	To Atlanta Thrashers: Jani Hurme	
December 2, 2003	To Nashville Predators: Simon Gamache; Kirill Safronov	To Atlanta Thrashers: Tomas Kloucek; Ben Simon	
December 31, 2003	To Columbus Blue Jackets: Future considerations	To Atlanta Thrashers: Jean-Luc Grand-Pierre	
January 6, 2004	To Ottawa Senators: Brad Tapper	To Atlanta Thrashers: Daniel Corso	
March 8, 2004	To Florida Panthers: Kamil Piros	To Atlanta Thrashers: Kyle Rossiter	
March 9, 2004	To Los Angeles Kings: Jeff Cowan	To Atlanta Thrashers: Kip Brennan	

=== Players acquired ===
Date	Player	Former team	Term	Via	Ref
July 24, 2003	Brian Swanson	Edmonton Oilers		Free agency	
August 12, 2003	Eric Healey	Manchester Monarchs (AHL)		Free agency	
August 12, 2003	Randy Robitaille	New York Islanders		Free agency	
August 25, 2003	Bill Lindsay	Montreal Canadiens		Free agency	
September 10, 2003	Shawn Heins	Pittsburgh Penguins		Free agency	
October 3, 2003	Serge Aubin	Colorado Avalanche		Waiver draft	
October 3, 2003	Shawn Heins	New York Rangers		Waiver draft	
October 3, 2003	Ronald Petrovicky	New York Rangers		Waiver draft	
February 25, 2004	Brad Larsen	Colorado Avalanche		Waivers	

=== Players lost ===
Date	Player	New team	Via (Note: In parentheses is the player's free agency group on July 1 if applicable.)	Ref
July 1, 2003	Yuri Butsayev	HC CSKA Moscow (RSL)	Free agency (II) (Note: The Thrashers retained Butsayev’s NHL rights through the 2006–07 season.)	
July 1, 2003	Mark Hartigan	Columbus Blue Jackets (Note: Hartigan signed with Columbus on July 15.)	Buyout	
July 1, 2003	Damian Rhodes (Note: Rhodes retired.)		Contract expiration (III)	
July 14, 2003	Ben Simon	Nashville Predators	Free agency (VI)	
July 18, 2003	Andreas Karlsson	EHC Basel (NLA)	Free agency (UFA)	
July 21, 2003	Per Svartvadet	Modo Hockey (SHL)	Free agency (UFA)	
July 28, 2003	Jeff Farkas		Retirement (VI)	
August 6, 2003	Dallas Eakins	Vancouver Canucks	Free agency (UFA)	
August 7, 2003	Jeff Odgers		Retirement (III)	
September 30, 2003	Shawn Heins	New York Rangers	Waivers	
November 2, 2003	Lubos Bartecko	HC Sparta Praha (ELH)	Free agency (UFA)	
November 4, 2003	Tony Hrkac	Nashville Predators	Free agency (III)	
March 9, 2004	Jean-Luc Grand-Pierre	Washington Capitals	Waivers	
March 9, 2004	Bill Lindsay	Washington Capitals	Waivers (Note: Claim rescinded due to the severity of the throat injury Lindsay suffered during a January 3 game.)	
April 20, 2004	Brian Swanson	Kassel Huskies (DEL)	Free agency	
April 26, 2004	Randy Robitaille	ZSC Lions (NLA)	Free agency	

=== Signings ===
Date	Player	Term	Contract type	Ref
June 18, 2003	Byron Dafoe	1-year	Option exercised	
July 11, 2003	Tommi Santala		Entry-level	
July 17, 2003	Ivan Majesky		Re-signing	
July 17, 2003	Andy Sutton		Re-signing	
July 24, 2003	Kamil Piros		Re-signing	
July 26, 2003	Vyacheslav Kozlov		Re-signing	
August 11, 2003	Pasi Nurminen	1-year (Note: Club option for a second year.)	Re-signing	
August 13, 2003	Marc Savard	1-year	Re-signing	
August 20, 2003	Stephen Baby		Entry-level	
September 15, 2003	Joe DiPenta		Re-signing	
June 2, 2004	Lane Manson		Entry-level	
June 2, 2004	Brad Schell		Entry-level	
June 2, 2004	Brian Sipotz		Entry-level	

== Draft picks ==
Atlanta's draft picks at the 2003 NHL entry draft held at the Gaylord Entertainment Center in Nashville, Tennessee.

Round	#	Player	Nationality	College/Junior/Club team (League)
1	8	Braydon Coburn	Canada	Portland Winterhawks (WHL)
4	110	Jim Sharrow	United States	Halifax Mooseheads (QMJHL)
4	116	Guillaume Desbiens	Canada	Rouyn-Noranda Huskies (QMJHL)
4	136	Michael Vannelli	United States	Sioux Falls Stampede (USHL)
5	145	Brett Sterling	United States	Colorado College (NCAA)
6	175	Mike Hamilton	Canada	Merritt Centennials (BCHL)
7	203	Denis Loginov	Russia	Ak Bars Kazan (Russia)
8	239	Tobias Enstrom	Sweden	Modo Hockey (Sweden)
9	269	Rylan Kaip	Canada	Notre Dame Hounds (SJHL)
