= 2003–04 Los Angeles Kings season =

National Hockey League team season

2003–04 Los Angeles Kings
- Division: 3rd Pacific
- Conference: 11th Western
- 2003–04 record: 28–29–16–9
- Home record: 15–16–9–1
- Road record: 13–13–7–8
- Goals for: 205
- Goals against: 217

Team information
- General manager: Dave Taylor
- Coach: Andy Murray
- Captain: Mattias Norstrom
- Alternate captains: Ian Laperriere; Zigmund Palffy; Luc Robitaille
- Arena: Staples Center
- Average attendance: 17,889
- Minor league affiliates: Manchester Monarchs; Reading Royals

Team leaders
- Goals: Alexander Frolov (24)
- Assists: Luc Robitaille (29); Jozef Stumpel (29)
- Points: Luc Robitaille (51)
- Penalty minutes: Sean Avery (261)
- Plus/minus: Zigmund Palffy (+18)
- Wins: Roman Cechmanek (18)
- Goals against average: Cristobal Huet (2.43)

The 2003–04 Los Angeles Kings season was their 37th National Hockey League season. The Kings placed third in their division, 11th overall in their conference, and failed to qualify for the playoffs due to a season-ending, 11-game losing streak.

== Regular season ==
=== Final standings ===
Pacific Division
No.	CR		GP	W	L	T	OTL	GF	GA	Pts
1	2	**San Jose Sharks**	82	43	21	12	6	219	183	104
2	5	**Dallas Stars**	82	41	26	13	2	194	175	97
3	11	Los Angeles Kings	82	28	29	16	9	205	217	81
4	12	Mighty Ducks of Anaheim	82	29	35	10	8	184	213	76
5	13	Phoenix Coyotes	82	22	36	18	6	188	245	68

Note: CR = Conference rank; GP = Games played; W = Wins; L = Losses; T = Ties; OTL = Overtime loss; GF = Goals for; GA = Goals against; Pts = Points
Bolded teams qualified for the playoffs.

Western Conference
R		Div	GP	W	L	T	OTL	GF	GA	Pts
**1**	**P-** Detroit Red Wings	**CE**	**82**	**48**	**21**	**11**	**2**	**255**	**189**	109
**2**	**Y-** San Jose Sharks	**PA**	**82**	**43**	**21**	**12**	**6**	**255**	**183**	104
**3**	**Y-** Vancouver Canucks	**NW**	**82**	**43**	**24**	**10**	**5**	**235**	**194**	101
**4**	**X-** Colorado Avalanche	**NW**	**82**	**40**	**22**	**13**	**7**	**236**	**198**	100
**5**	**X-** Dallas Stars	**PA**	**82**	**41**	**26**	**13**	**2**	**194**	**175**	97
**6**	**X-** Calgary Flames	**NW**	**82**	**42**	**30**	**7**	**3**	**200**	**176**	94
**7**	**X-** St. Louis Blues	**CE**	**82**	**39**	**30**	**11**	**2**	**191**	**198**	91
**8**	**X-** Nashville Predators	**CE**	**82**	**38**	**29**	**11**	**4**	**216**	**217**	91
8.5
9	Edmonton Oilers	NW	82	36	29	12	5	221	208	89
10	Minnesota Wild	NW	82	30	29	20	3	188	183	83
11	Los Angeles Kings	PA	82	28	29	16	9	205	217	81
12	Mighty Ducks of Anaheim	PA	82	29	35	10	8	184	213	76
13	Phoenix Coyotes	PA	82	22	36	18	6	188	245	68
14	Columbus Blue Jackets	CE	82	25	45	8	4	177	238	62
15	Chicago Blackhawks	CE	82	20	43	11	8	188	259	59

Divisions: CE – Central, PA – Pacific, NW – Northwest

P – Clinched Presidents Trophy; Y – Clinched division; X – Clinched playoff spot

== Schedule and results ==
2003–04 regular season
October: 4–5–0–0 (home: 2–4–0–0; road: 2–1–0–0)

Game	Date	Score	Opponent	Record	Recap
1	October 9, 2003	2–3	@ Detroit Red Wings (2003–04)	0–1–0–0	L
2	October 10, 2003	3–0	@ Pittsburgh Penguins (2003–04)	1–1–0–0	W
3	October 12, 2003	4–2	@ Chicago Blackhawks (2003–04)	2–1–0–0	W
4	October 15, 2003	4–3	Ottawa Senators (2003–04)	3–1–0–0	W
5	October 18, 2003	3–4	Boston Bruins (2003–04)	3–2–0–0	L
6	October 21, 2003	4–0	Philadelphia Flyers (2003–04)	4–2–0–0	W
7	October 23, 2003	1–5	Buffalo Sabres (2003–04)	4–3–0–0	L
8	October 25, 2003	2–3	Chicago Blackhawks (2003–04)	4–4–0–0	L
9	October 30, 2003	1–3	Vancouver Canucks (2003–04)	4–5–0–0	L

November: 8–4–1–1 (home: 3–2–1–0; road: 5–2–0–1)

Game	Date	Score	Opponent	Record	Recap
10	November 1, 2003	7–3	Phoenix Coyotes (2003–04)	5–5–0–0	W
11	November 5, 2003	3–2	@ Florida Panthers (2003–04)	6–5–0–0	W
12	November 6, 2003	1–0 OT	@ Tampa Bay Lightning (2003–04)	7–5–0–0	W
13	November 8, 2003	2–3 OT	@ Carolina Hurricanes (2003–04)	7–5–0–1	OTL
14	November 10, 2003	3–2	@ Washington Capitals (2003–04)	8–5–0–1	W
15	November 13, 2003	4–4 OT	Toronto Maple Leafs (2003–04)	8–5–1–1	T
16	November 15, 2003	0–1	St. Louis Blues (2003–04)	8–6–1–1	L
17	November 19, 2003	3–0	Nashville Predators (2003–04)	9–6–1–1	W
18	November 21, 2003	1–3	@ Dallas Stars (2003–04)	9–7–1–1	L
19	November 22, 2003	2–0	@ Colorado Avalanche (2003–04)	10–7–1–1	W
20	November 25, 2003	0–4	New Jersey Devils (2003–04)	10–8–1–1	L
21	November 27, 2003	4–6	@ Phoenix Coyotes (2003–04)	10–9–1–1	L
22	November 29, 2003	3–1	Chicago Blackhawks (2003–04)	11–9–1–1	W
23	November 30, 2003	2–1	@ Dallas Stars (2003–04)	12–9–1–1	W

December: 4–4–4–3 (home: 3–0–3–1; road: 1–4–1–2)

Game	Date	Score	Opponent	Record	Recap
24	December 2, 2003	1–4	@ St. Louis Blues (2003–04)	12–10–1–1	L
25	December 4, 2003	3–0	Dallas Stars (2003–04)	13–10–1–1	W
26	December 6, 2003	7–3	Washington Capitals (2003–04)	14–10–1–1	W
27	December 8, 2003	2–3 OT	@ Detroit Red Wings (2003–04)	14–10–1–2	OTL
28	December 10, 2003	3–4 OT	@ Atlanta Thrashers (2003–04)	14–10–1–3	OTL
29	December 11, 2003	4–1	@ Nashville Predators (2003–04)	15–10–1–3	W
30	December 13, 2003	1–2	@ St. Louis Blues (2003–04)	15–11–1–3	L
31	December 16, 2003	4–2	Edmonton Oilers (2003–04)	16–11–1–3	W
32	December 18, 2003	4–4 OT	Phoenix Coyotes (2003–04)	16–11–2–3	T
33	December 20, 2003	3–3 OT	Colorado Avalanche (2003–04)	16–11–3–3	T
34	December 22, 2003	4–4 OT	@ Vancouver Canucks (2003–04)	16–11–4–3	T
35	December 26, 2003	0–5	@ San Jose Sharks (2003–04)	16–12–4–3	L
36	December 27, 2003	4–4 OT	San Jose Sharks (2003–04)	16–12–5–3	T
37	December 30, 2003	2–3 OT	New York Rangers (2003–04)	16–12–5–4	OTL
38	December 31, 2003	0–4	@ Phoenix Coyotes (2003–04)	16–13–5–4	L

January: 5–2–7–1 (home: 2–2–4–0; road: 3–0–3–1)

Game	Date	Score	Opponent	Record	Recap
39	January 3, 2004	2–2 OT	Dallas Stars (2003–04)	16–13–6–4	T
40	January 7, 2004	4–4 OT	@ Mighty Ducks of Anaheim (2003–04)	16–13–7–4	T
41	January 8, 2004	1–3	Vancouver Canucks (2003–04)	16–14–7–4	L
42	January 10, 2004	2–2 OT	Columbus Blue Jackets (2003–04)	16–14–8–4	T
43	January 13, 2004	0–0 OT	@ Nashville Predators (2003–04)	16–14–9–4	T
44	January 14, 2004	2–2 OT	@ Minnesota Wild (2003–04)	16–14–10–4	T
45	January 16, 2004	2–3 OT	@ Columbus Blue Jackets (2003–04)	16–14–10–5	OTL
46	January 18, 2004	2–1	@ Chicago Blackhawks (2003–04)	17–14–10–5	W
47	January 20, 2004	4–1	Calgary Flames (2003–04)	18–14–10–5	W
48	January 22, 2004	4–5	Detroit Red Wings (2003–04)	18–15–10–5	L
49	January 24, 2004	4–2	Mighty Ducks of Anaheim (2003–04)	19–15–10–5	W
50	January 26, 2004	2–2 OT	Minnesota Wild (2003–04)	19–15–11–5	T
51	January 28, 2004	4–3 OT	@ Mighty Ducks of Anaheim (2003–04)	20–15–11–5	W
52	January 29, 2004	3–3 OT	Colorado Avalanche (2003–04)	20–15–12–5	T
53	January 31, 2004	4–3	@ Edmonton Oilers (2003–04)	21–15–12–5	W

February: 4–3–3–2 (home: 3–1–0–0; road: 1–2–3–2)

Game	Date	Score	Opponent	Record	Recap
54	February 3, 2004	4–4 OT	@ Calgary Flames (2003–04)	21–15–13–5	T
55	February 10, 2004	3–1	@ Minnesota Wild (2003–04)	22–15–13–5	W
56	February 11, 2004	2–3 OT	@ Columbus Blue Jackets (2003–04)	22–15–13–6	OTL
57	February 13, 2004	3–8	@ Buffalo Sabres (2003–04)	22–16–13–6	L
58	February 15, 2004	2–3 OT	@ New Jersey Devils (2003–04)	22–16–13–7	OTL
59	February 16, 2004	1–1 OT	@ New York Islanders (2003–04)	22–16–14–7	T
60	February 18, 2004	3–4	Dallas Stars (2003–04)	22–17–14–7	L
61	February 21, 2004	4–3	Columbus Blue Jackets (2003–04)	23–17–14–7	W
62	February 23, 2004	3–0	Nashville Predators (2003–04)	24–17–14–7	W
63	February 25, 2004	1–1 OT	@ Dallas Stars (2003–04)	24–17–15–7	T
64	February 28, 2004	2–1	Mighty Ducks of Anaheim (2003–04)	25–17–15–7	W
65	February 29, 2004	3–6	@ Mighty Ducks of Anaheim (2003–04)	25–18–15–7	L

March: 3–10–1–1 (home: 2–6–1–0; road: 1–4–0–1)

Game	Date	Score	Opponent	Record	Recap
66	March 4, 2004	1–1 OT	Minnesota Wild (2003–04)	25–18–16–7	T
67	March 6, 2004	2–4	Montreal Canadiens (2003–04)	25–19–16–7	L
68	March 9, 2004	3–2	Phoenix Coyotes (2003–04)	26–19–16–7	W
69	March 10, 2004	3–1	@ Phoenix Coyotes (2003–04)	27–19–16–7	W
70	March 13, 2004	1–3	@ San Jose Sharks (2003–04)	27–20–16–7	L
71	March 14, 2004	5–1	Mighty Ducks of Anaheim (2003–04)	28–20–16–7	W
72	March 16, 2004	3–5	St. Louis Blues (2003–04)	28–21–16–7	L
73	March 18, 2004	3–5	San Jose Sharks (2003–04)	28–22–16–7	L
74	March 20, 2004	2–4	Detroit Red Wings (2003–04)	28–23–16–7	L
75	March 22, 2004	1–2	Edmonton Oilers (2003–04)	28–24–16–7	L
76	March 24, 2004	0–1	@ Vancouver Canucks (2003–04)	28–25–16–7	L
77	March 26, 2004	1–3	@ Edmonton Oilers (2003–04)	28–26–16–7	L
78	March 27, 2004	2–3 OT	@ Calgary Flames (2003–04)	28–26–16–8	OTL
79	March 29, 2004	1–2	@ Colorado Avalanche (2003–04)	28–27–16–8	L
80	March 31, 2004	0–3	San Jose Sharks (2003–04)	28–28–16–8	L

April: 0–1–0–1 (home: 0–1–0–0; road: 0–0–0–1)

Game	Date	Score	Opponent	Record	Recap
81	April 2, 2004	2–3	Calgary Flames (2003–04)	28–29–16–8	L
82	April 4, 2004	3–4 OT	@ San Jose Sharks (2003–04)	28–29–16–9	OTL

Legend: W Win (2 points) L Loss (0 points) T Tie (1 point) OTL Overtime loss (1 point)

== Player statistics ==
=== Scoring ===
- Position abbreviations: C = Center; D = Defense; G = Goaltender; LW = Left wing; RW = Right wing
- † = Joined team via a transaction (e.g., trade, waivers, signing) during the season. Stats reflect time with the Kings only.
- ‡ = Left team via a transaction (e.g., trade, waivers, release) during the season. Stats reflect time with the Kings only.

No.	Player	Pos	Regular season					
No.	Player	Pos	GP	G	A	Pts	+/-	PIM
20	Luc Robitaille	LW	80	22	29	51	4	56
24	Alexander Frolov	LW	77	24	24	48	8	24
26	Trent Klatt	RW	82	17	26	43	2	46
33	Zigmund Palffy	RW	35	16	25	41	18	12
15	Jozef Stumpel	C	64	8	29	37	5	16
7	Derek Armstrong	C	57	14	21	35	4	33
25	Eric Belanger	C	81	13	20	33	−16	44
44	Jaroslav Modry	D	79	5	27	32	11	44
17	Lubomir Visnovsky	D	58	8	21	29	8	26
19	Sean Avery	C	76	9	19	28	2	261
27	Joe Corvo	D	72	8	17	25	7	36
22	Ian Laperriere	RW	62	10	12	22	−4	58
13	Michael Cammalleri	C	31	9	6	15	1	20
82	Martin Straka†	C	32	6	8	14	−9	4
14	Mattias Norstrom	D	74	1	13	14	−3	44
43	Jon Sim‡	LW	48	6	7	13	0	27
62	Scott Barney	C	19	5	6	11	3	4
12	Esa Pirnes	C	57	3	8	11	−9	12
10	Nathan Dempsey†	D	17	4	3	7	−7	2
29	Brad Chartrand	C	53	3	4	7	−3	30
42	Tim Gleason	D	47	0	7	7	1	21
53	Jason Holland	D	52	3	3	6	5	24
21	John Tripp	RW	34	1	5	6	−4	33
5	Tomas Zizka	D	15	2	3	5	−4	12
23	Dustin Brown	LW	31	1	4	5	0	16
8	Jeff Cowan†	LW	13	2	1	3	−1	24
3	Aaron Miller	D	35	1	2	3	−3	32
8	Martin Strbak‡	D	5	2	0	2	1	8
55	Pavel Rosa	RW	2	1	1	2	1	0
37	Kip Brennan‡	LW	18	1	0	1	−1	79
11	Anson Carter†	RW	15	0	1	1	−5	0
39	Noah Clarke	LW	2	0	1	1	1	0
38	Denis Grebeshkov	D	4	0	1	1	−4	0
6	Maxim Kuznetsov	D	16	0	1	1	−5	20
2	Bryan Muir	D	2	0	1	1	1	2
63	Brad Norton‡	D	20	0	1	1	−1	77
52	Jerred Smithson	C	8	0	1	1	0	4
32	Roman Cechmanek	G	49	0	0	0		2
46	Mathieu Chouinard	G	1	0	0	0		0
1	Milan Hnilicka	G	2	0	0	0		0
35	Cristobal Huet	G	41	0	0	0		4
11	Steve Kelly	C	3	0	0	0	0	0

=== Goaltending ===
No.	Player	Regular season									
No.	Player	GP	W	L	T	SA	GA	GAA	SV%	SO	TOI
32	Roman Cechmanek	49	18	21	6	1198	113	2.51	.906	5	2701
35	Cristobal Huet	41	10	16	10	961	89	2.43	.907	3	2199
46	Mathieu Chouinard	1	0	0	0	2	0	0.00	1.000	0	3
1	Milan Hnilicka	2	0	1	0	42	5	3.75	.881	0	80

== Awards and records ==
=== Awards ===
Type	Award/honor	Recipient	Ref
League (in-season)	NHL All-Star Game selection	Mattias Norstrom	
Team	Ace Bailey Memorial Award	Luc Robitaille	
Team	Bill Libby Memorial Award	Luc Robitaille	
Team	Defensive Player	Mattias Norstrom	
Team	Jim Fox Community Service	Ian Laperriere	
Team	Leading Scorer	Luc Robitaille	
Team	Mark Bavis Memorial Award	Trent Klatt	
Team	Most Popular Player	Alexander Frolov	
Team	Outstanding Defenseman	Lubomir Visnovsky	
Team	Unsung Hero	Trent Klatt	

=== Milestones ===
Milestone	Player	Date	Ref
First game	Dustin Brown	October 9, 2003	
First game	Tim Gleason	October 9, 2003	
First game	Esa Pirnes	October 9, 2003	
First game	Martin Strbak	October 10, 2003	
First game	Noah Clarke	December 16, 2003	
First game	Denis Grebeshkov	February 28, 2004	
First game	Mathieu Chouinard	February 29, 2004	
25th shutout	Roman Cechmanek	January 13, 2004	

== Transactions ==
The Kings were involved in the following transactions from June 10, 2003, the day after the deciding game of the 2003 Stanley Cup Finals, through June 7, 2004, the day of the deciding game of the 2004 Stanley Cup Finals.

=== Trades ===
Date	Details		Ref
June 20, 2003	To Los Angeles Kings: Jozef Stumpel; 7th-round pick in 2003	To Boston Bruins: Philadelphia’s 4th-round pick in 2003; Detroit’s 2nd-round pick in 2004	
June 22, 2003	To Los Angeles Kings: 6th-round pick in 2003	To Nashville Predators: 7th-round pick in 2003; Boston’s 7th-round pick in 2003	
June 22, 2003	To Los Angeles Kings: 9th-round pick in 2004	To Columbus Blue Jackets: 9th-round pick in 2003	
September 15, 2003	To Los Angeles Kings: Milan Hnilicka	To Atlanta Thrashers: Future considerations	
November 30, 2003	To Los Angeles Kings: Martin Straka	To Pittsburgh Penguins: Sergei Anshakov; Martin Strbak	
March 2, 2004	To Los Angeles Kings: Nathan Dempsey	To Chicago Blackhawks: 4th-round pick in 2005; Future considerations	
March 8, 2004	To Los Angeles Kings: Anson Carter	To Washington Capitals: Jared Aulin	
March 9, 2004	To Los Angeles Kings: Jeff Cowan	To Atlanta Thrashers: Kip Brennan	

=== Players acquired ===
Date	Player	Former team	Term	Via	Ref
July 7, 2003	Mathieu Chouinard	Ottawa Senators	1-year	Free agency	
July 7, 2003	Trent Klatt	Vancouver Canucks	2-year	Free agency	
July 24, 2003	Luc Robitaille	Detroit Red Wings	1-year	Free agency	
July 31, 2003	Bryan Muir	Colorado Avalanche	1-year	Free agency	
August 6, 2003	John Tripp	New York Rangers	1-year	Free agency	

=== Players lost ===
Date	Player	New team	Via (Note: In parentheses is the player's free agency group on July 1 if applicable.)	Ref
July 1, 2003	Ken Belanger (Note: Belanger was inactive during the 2003–04 season.)		Contract expiration (UFA)	
July 24, 2003	Steve Heinze (Note: Heinze retired.)		Buyout	
July 25, 2003	Erik Rasmussen	New Jersey Devils	Free agency (UFA)	
August 12, 2003	Travis Scott	Florida Panthers	Free agency (VI)	
September 3, 2003	Felix Potvin	Boston Bruins	Free agency (III)	
September 5, 2003	Mikko Eloranta	TPS (Liiga)	Free agency (UFA)	
September 9, 2003	Craig Johnson	Anaheim Mighty Ducks	Free agency (III)	
September 10, 2003	Derek Bekar	New York Islanders	Free agency (VI)	
September 11, 2003	Chris McAlpine	Minnesota Wild	Free agency (III)	
October 3, 2003	Jamie Storr	Carolina Hurricanes	Free agency (UFA)	
October 9, 2003	Mike Pudlick	Portland Pirates (AHL)	Free agency (VI)	
October 15, 2003	Greg Koehler	Elmira Jackals (UHL)	Free agency (VI)	
March 4, 2004	Brad Norton	Washington Capitals	Waivers	
March 4, 2004	Jon Sim	Pittsburgh Penguins	Waivers	
April 20, 2004	John Tripp	Adler Mannheim (DEL)	Free agency	
May 4, 2004	Steve Kelly	Adler Mannheim (DEL)	Free agency (Note: The Kings retained Kelly’s NHL rights through the 2005–06 season.)	
May 4, 2004	Pavel Rosa	Dynamo Moscow (RSL)	Free agency	
May 18, 2004	Milan Hnilicka	Bílí Tygři Liberec (ELH)	Free agency	
June 7, 2004	Maxim Kuznetsov	Dynamo Moscow (RSL)	Free agency	

=== Signings ===
Date	Player	Term	Contract type	Ref
June 26, 2003	Petr Kanko	3-year	Entry-level	
July 1, 2003	Chris Schmidt	1-year	Re-signing	
July 8, 2003	Richard Seeley	1-year	Re-signing	
July 15, 2003	Denis Grebeshkov	3-year	Entry-level	
July 15, 2003	Esa Pirnes		Entry-level	
July 15, 2003	Martin Strbak		Entry-level	
July 16, 2003	Jon Sim	1-year	Re-signing	
July 17, 2003	Adam Deadmarsh	1-year	Re-signing	
July 17, 2003	Ryan Flinn		Re-signing	
July 25, 2003	Steve Kelly		Re-signing	
July 28, 2003	Maxim Kuznetsov	1-year	Re-signing	
July 28, 2003	Brad Norton	1-year	Re-signing	
July 30, 2003	Joe Rullier	1-year	Re-signing	
July 31, 2003	Kip Brennan	1-year	Re-signing	
July 31, 2003	Jerred Smithson	1-year	Re-signing	
July 31, 2003	Jozef Stumpel	1-year	Re-signing	
August 1, 2003	Sean Avery	1-year	Re-signing	
August 1, 2003	Scott Barney	1-year	Re-signing	
October 4, 2003	Dustin Brown	3-year	Entry-level	
April 2, 2004	Derek Armstrong	2-year (Note: Option for a third year.)	Extension	
April 8, 2004	Gregory Hogeboom	2-year	Entry-level	
April 27, 2004	Esa Pirnes	1-year	Option exercised	
May 6, 2004	Nathan Dempsey	multi-year	Extension	
June 4, 2004	George Parros	1-year	Extension	

== Draft picks ==
Los Angeles' picks of the 2003 NHL entry draft held at the Gaylord Entertainment Center in Nashville, Tennessee on June 21, 2003.

Round	#	Player	Nationality	College/Junior/Club team (League)
1	13	Dustin Brown	United States	Guelph Storm (OHL)
1	26	Brian Boyle	United States	Saint Sebastian's School (USHS-MA)
1	27	Jeff Tambellini	Canada	University of Michigan (NCAA)
2	44	Konstantin Pushkarev	Kazakhstan	Torpedo Ust-Kamenogorsk (Kazakhstan)
3	82	Ryan Munce	Canada	Sarnia Sting (OHL)
5	152	Brady Murray	Canada	Salmon Arm Silverbacks (BCHL)
6	174	Esa Pirnes	Finland	Tappara (Finland)
8	231	Matt Zaba	Canada	Vernon (BCHL)
8	244	Mike Sullivan	Canada	Stouffville Spirit (OPJRA)
9	274	Marty Guerin	United States	Des Moines Buccaneers (USHL)
