= 2003–04 Phoenix Coyotes season =

NHL hockey team season

2003–04 Phoenix Coyotes
- Division: 5th Pacific
- Conference: 13th Western
- 2003–04 record: 22–36–18–6
- Home record: 11–19–7–4
- Road record: 11–17–11–2
- Goals for: 188
- Goals against: 245

Team information
- General manager: Mike Barnett
- Coach: Bob Francis (Oct.–Feb.); Rick Bowness (Feb.–Apr.)
- Captain: Shane Doan
- Alternate captains: Cale Hulse (Nov.–Apr.); Mike Johnson (Note: Johnson had season-ending shoulder surgery in November. Hulse replaced him for the remainder of the season.); Daymond Langkow
- Arena: America West Arena; Glendale Arena
- Average attendance: 15,467
- Minor league affiliate: Springfield Falcons

Team leaders
- Goals: Shane Doan (27)
- Assists: Shane Doan (41)
- Points: Shane Doan (68)
- Penalty minutes: Andrei Nazarov (125)
- Plus/minus: Ladislav Nagy (+11)
- Wins: Brian Boucher (10); Sean Burke (10)
- Goals against average: Brian Boucher (2.74)

The 2003–04 Phoenix Coyotes season was their eighth season in the National Hockey League. For the second year in a row, the Coyotes failed to make the playoffs. It would be the first season the franchise would have playing their home games at the Glendale Arena. However, because the Glendale Arena didn't open until December 26, the first 13 home games were played at America West Arena. The Coyotes went 5–14–5–4 for 19 points in their new home arena.

== Off-season ==
Phoenix went into the talent-rich 2003 NHL entry draft without a first or second-round draft choice, both having been traded in part for Daymond Langkow in 2001 and Brad Ference at the 2003 trading deadline, respectively. They made their first selection in the third round, 77th overall, selecting centerman Tyler Redenbach. None of the eight players they drafted played a single NHL game.

Defenseman and team captain Teppo Numminen was traded to the Dallas Stars on July 22. Forward Shane Doan was named his replacement on the eve of training camp.

== Regular season ==
Though the Coyotes finished last in their division (13th in the Conference), for a remarkable span in late December and early January, the team attracted the attention of the sports world, as goaltender Brian Boucher set an NHL record for consecutive shutouts. From December 31 to January 9, Boucher and the Coyotes recorded five consecutive shut-out victories, outscoring their opponents 18–0 during the span. The streak was broken on January 11 in a game against the visiting Atlanta Thrashers, when Randy Robitaille scored on Boucher at 6:16 of the first period. Boucher's streak lasted 332:01, surpassing Montreal Canadiens goaltender Bill Durnan's 1949 record by over 20 minutes.

The Coyotes struggled after the streak, winning only six of their remaining 40 games. A winless streak of 15 games from February 21 to March 21 is the longest in franchise history. Head coach Bob Francis was fired on February 24 and replaced by assistant coach Rick Bowness, who served as interim head coach for the remainder of the season and throughout the 2004–05 NHL lockout.

=== Final standings ===
Pacific Division
No.	CR		GP	W	L	T	OTL	GF	GA	Pts
1	2	**San Jose Sharks**	82	43	21	12	6	219	183	104
2	5	**Dallas Stars**	82	41	26	13	2	194	175	97
3	11	Los Angeles Kings	82	28	29	16	9	205	217	81
4	12	Mighty Ducks of Anaheim	82	29	35	10	8	184	213	76
5	13	Phoenix Coyotes	82	22	36	18	6	188	245	68

Note: CR = Conference rank; GP = Games played; W = Wins; L = Losses; T = Ties; OTL = Overtime loss; GF = Goals for; GA = Goals against; Pts = Points
Bolded teams qualified for the playoffs.

Western Conference
R		Div	GP	W	L	T	OTL	GF	GA	Pts
**1**	**P-** Detroit Red Wings	**CE**	**82**	**48**	**21**	**11**	**2**	**255**	**189**	109
**2**	**Y-** San Jose Sharks	**PA**	**82**	**43**	**21**	**12**	**6**	**255**	**183**	104
**3**	**Y-** Vancouver Canucks	**NW**	**82**	**43**	**24**	**10**	**5**	**235**	**194**	101
**4**	**X-** Colorado Avalanche	**NW**	**82**	**40**	**22**	**13**	**7**	**236**	**198**	100
**5**	**X-** Dallas Stars	**PA**	**82**	**41**	**26**	**13**	**2**	**194**	**175**	97
**6**	**X-** Calgary Flames	**NW**	**82**	**42**	**30**	**7**	**3**	**200**	**176**	94
**7**	**X-** St. Louis Blues	**CE**	**82**	**39**	**30**	**11**	**2**	**191**	**198**	91
**8**	**X-** Nashville Predators	**CE**	**82**	**38**	**29**	**11**	**4**	**216**	**217**	91
8.5
9	Edmonton Oilers	NW	82	36	29	12	5	221	208	89
10	Minnesota Wild	NW	82	30	29	20	3	188	183	83
11	Los Angeles Kings	PA	82	28	29	16	9	205	217	81
12	Mighty Ducks of Anaheim	PA	82	29	35	10	8	184	213	76
13	Phoenix Coyotes	PA	82	22	36	18	6	188	245	68
14	Columbus Blue Jackets	CE	82	25	45	8	4	177	238	62
15	Chicago Blackhawks	CE	82	20	43	11	8	188	259	59

Divisions: CE – Central, PA – Pacific, NW – Northwest

P – Clinched Presidents Trophy; Y – Clinched division; X – Clinched playoff spot

== Schedule and results ==
2003–04 regular season
October: 3–4–3–0 (home: 1–3–1–0; road: 2–1–2–0)

Game	Date	Score	Opponent	Record	Recap
1	October 10, 2003	2–1 OT	St. Louis Blues (2003–04)	1–0–0–0	W
2	October 12, 2003	2–0	@ Mighty Ducks of Anaheim (2003–04)	2–0–0–0	W
3	October 15, 2003	2–1	@ Florida Panthers (2003–04)	3–0–0–0	W
4	October 16, 2003	1–5	@ Tampa Bay Lightning (2003–04)	3–1–0–0	L
5	October 18, 2003	4–5	Philadelphia Flyers (2003–04)	3–2–0–0	L
6	October 23, 2003	4–5	Toronto Maple Leafs (2003–04)	3–3–0–0	L
7	October 25, 2003	4–4 OT	@ San Jose Sharks (2003–04)	3–3–1–0	T
8	October 26, 2003	3–3 OT	@ Vancouver Canucks (2003–04)	3–3–2–0	T
9	October 28, 2003	2–2 OT	Chicago Blackhawks (2003–04)	3–3–3–0	T
10	October 31, 2003	1–4	Vancouver Canucks (2003–04)	3–4–3–0	L

November: 4–5–3–1 (home: 4–1–0–0; road: 0–4–3–1)

Game	Date	Score	Opponent	Record	Recap
11	November 1, 2003	3–7	@ Los Angeles Kings (2003–04)	3–5–3–0	L
12	November 6, 2003	1–2	@ Colorado Avalanche (2003–04)	3–6–3–0	L
13	November 8, 2003	4–3 OT	Mighty Ducks of Anaheim (2003–04)	4–6–3–0	W
14	November 9, 2003	1–2 OT	@ Mighty Ducks of Anaheim (2003–04)	4–6–3–1	OTL
15	November 13, 2003	3–2 OT	Colorado Avalanche (2003–04)	5–6–3–1	W
16	November 14, 2003	3–3 OT	@ Dallas Stars (2003–04)	5–6–4–1	T
17	November 16, 2003	2–2 OT	@ Columbus Blue Jackets (2003–04)	5–6–5–1	T
18	November 19, 2003	5–4	St. Louis Blues (2003–04)	6–6–5–1	W
19	November 21, 2003	0–5	San Jose Sharks (2003–04)	6–7–5–1	L
20	November 23, 2003	0–1	@ Atlanta Thrashers (2003–04)	6–8–5–1	L
21	November 24, 2003	2–5	@ Dallas Stars (2003–04)	6–9–5–1	L
22	November 27, 2003	6–4	Los Angeles Kings (2003–04)	7–9–5–1	W
23	November 30, 2003	3–3 OT	@ Boston Bruins (2003–04)	7–9–6–1	T

December: 5–3–5–1 (home: 2–2–1–1; road: 3–1–4–0)

Game	Date	Score	Opponent	Record	Recap
24	December 2, 2003	3–1	@ New Jersey Devils (2003–04)	8–9–6–1	W
25	December 4, 2003	3–2	@ Buffalo Sabres (2003–04)	9–9–6–1	W
26	December 5, 2003	2–3	@ Philadelphia Flyers (2003–04)	9–10–6–1	L
27	December 7, 2003	2–2 OT	@ Chicago Blackhawks (2003–04)	9–10–7–1	T
28	December 10, 2003	2–1	Dallas Stars (2003–04)	10–10–7–1	W
29	December 12, 2003	3–3 OT	Edmonton Oilers (2003–04)	10–10–8–1	T
30	December 15, 2003	2–5	Minnesota Wild (2003–04)	10–11–8–1	L
31	December 18, 2003	4–4 OT	@ Los Angeles Kings (2003–04)	10–11–9–1	T
32	December 20, 2003	1–1 OT	@ St. Louis Blues (2003–04)	10–11–10–1	T
33	December 22, 2003	3–3 OT	@ Nashville Predators (2003–04)	10–11–11–1	T
34	December 23, 2003	2–1	@ Columbus Blue Jackets (2003–04)	11–11–11–1	W
35	December 27, 2003	1–3	Nashville Predators (2003–04)	11–12–11–1	L
36	December 29, 2003	2–3 OT	New York Rangers (2003–04)	11–12–11–2	OTL
37	December 31, 2003	4–0	Los Angeles Kings (2003–04)	12–12–11–2	W

January: 6–6–2–0 (home: 1–5–1–0; road: 5–1–1–0)

Game	Date	Score	Opponent	Record	Recap
38	January 2, 2004	6–0	@ Dallas Stars (2003–04)	13–12–11–2	W
39	January 4, 2004	3–0	@ Carolina Hurricanes (2003–04)	14–12–11–2	W
40	January 7, 2004	3–0	@ Washington Capitals (2003–04)	15–12–11–2	W
41	January 9, 2004	2–0	@ Minnesota Wild (2003–04)	16–12–11–2	W
42	January 11, 2004	1–1 OT	Atlanta Thrashers (2003–04)	16–12–12–2	T
43	January 13, 2004	1–4	Vancouver Canucks (2003–04)	16–13–12–2	L
44	January 15, 2004	3–4	@ Nashville Predators (2003–04)	16–14–12–2	L
45	January 16, 2004	3–3 OT	@ Detroit Red Wings (2003–04)	16–14–13–2	T
46	January 21, 2004	2–4	San Jose Sharks (2003–04)	16–15–13–2	L
47	January 22, 2004	2–1	@ San Jose Sharks (2003–04)	17–15–13–2	W
48	January 24, 2004	5–2	Detroit Red Wings (2003–04)	18–15–13–2	W
49	January 27, 2004	1–2	Calgary Flames (2003–04)	18–16–13–2	L
50	January 29, 2004	1–4	Ottawa Senators (2003–04)	18–17–13–2	L
51	January 31, 2004	4–5	Dallas Stars (2003–04)	18–18–13–2	L

February: 2–8–2–2 (home: 2–3–2–2; road: 0–5–0–0)

Game	Date	Score	Opponent	Record	Recap
52	February 2, 2004	3–3 OT	Columbus Blue Jackets (2003–04)	18–18–14–2	T
53	February 4, 2004	4–5 OT	Florida Panthers (2003–04)	18–18–14–3	OTL
54	February 5, 2004	0–5	@ San Jose Sharks (2003–04)	18–19–14–3	L
55	February 11, 2004	3–5	@ Mighty Ducks of Anaheim (2003–04)	18–20–14–3	L
56	February 13, 2004	2–5	New York Islanders (2003–04)	18–21–14–3	L
57	February 14, 2004	3–2	Dallas Stars (2003–04)	19–21–14–3	W
58	February 16, 2004	2–4	@ St. Louis Blues (2003–04)	19–22–14–3	L
59	February 18, 2004	2–5	@ Detroit Red Wings (2003–04)	19–23–14–3	L
60	February 20, 2004	3–2	Columbus Blue Jackets (2003–04)	20–23–14–3	W
61	February 21, 2004	2–8	Nashville Predators (2003–04)	20–24–14–3	L
62	February 23, 2004	1–1 OT	Mighty Ducks of Anaheim (2003–04)	20–24–15–3	T
63	February 25, 2004	3–4 OT	Pittsburgh Penguins (2003–04)	20–24–15–4	OTL
64	February 27, 2004	2–7	Edmonton Oilers (2003–04)	20–25–15–4	L
65	February 29, 2004	2–4	@ Calgary Flames (2003–04)	20–26–15–4	L

March: 1–10–3–2 (home: 0–5–2–1; road: 1–5–1–1)

Game	Date	Score	Opponent	Record	Recap
66	March 2, 2004	4–5 OT	@ Edmonton Oilers (2003–04)	20–26–15–5	OTL
67	March 5, 2004	3–4	Montreal Canadiens (2003–04)	20–27–15–5	L
68	March 7, 2004	1–1 OT	Minnesota Wild (2003–04)	20–27–16–5	T
69	March 9, 2004	2–3	@ Los Angeles Kings (2003–04)	20–28–16–5	L
70	March 10, 2004	1–3	Los Angeles Kings (2003–04)	20–29–16–5	L
71	March 12, 2004	2–3	Colorado Avalanche (2003–04)	20–30–16–5	L
72	March 14, 2004	1–4	@ Colorado Avalanche (2003–04)	20–31–16–5	L
73	March 16, 2004	2–3 OT	Mighty Ducks of Anaheim (2003–04)	20–31–16–6	OTL
74	March 18, 2004	1–1 OT	Detroit Red Wings (2003–04)	20–31–17–6	T
75	March 21, 2004	2–2 OT	@ Chicago Blackhawks (2003–04)	20–31–18–6	T
76	March 22, 2004	3–2 OT	@ Minnesota Wild (2003–04)	21–31–18–6	W
77	March 24, 2004	0–4	Calgary Flames (2003–04)	21–32–18–6	L
78	March 26, 2004	0–3	San Jose Sharks (2003–04)	21–33–18–6	L
79	March 28, 2004	2–4	@ Edmonton Oilers (2003–04)	21–34–18–6	L
80	March 29, 2004	1–6	@ Vancouver Canucks (2003–04)	21–35–18–6	L
81	March 31, 2004	0–1	@ Calgary Flames (2003–04)	21–36–18–6	L

April: 1–0–0–0 (home: 1–0–0–0; road: 0–0–0–0)

Game	Date	Score	Opponent	Record	Recap
82	April 3, 2004	2–1 OT	Chicago Blackhawks (2003–04)	22–36–18–6	W

Legend: W Win (2 points) L Loss (0 points) T Tie (1 point) OTL Overtime loss (1 point)

== Player statistics ==
=== Scoring ===
- Position abbreviations: C = Center; D = Defense; G = Goaltender; LW = Left wing; RW = Right wing
- † = Joined team via a transaction (e.g., trade, waivers, signing) during the season. Stats reflect time with the Coyotes only.
- ‡ = Left team via a transaction (e.g., trade, waivers, release) during the season. Stats reflect time with the Coyotes only.

No.	Player	Pos	Regular season					
No.	Player	Pos	GP	G	A	Pts	+/-	PIM
19	Shane Doan	RW	79	27	41	68	−11	47
17	Ladislav Nagy	LW	55	24	28	52	11	46
11	Daymond Langkow	C	81	21	31	52	4	40
23	Paul Mara	D	81	6	36	42	−11	48
77	Chris Gratton‡	C	68	11	18	29	−19	93
24	Jan Hrdina‡	C	55	11	15	26	−10	30
49	Brian Savage‡	LW	61	12	13	25	−5	36
29	Branko Radivojevic‡	RW	53	9	14	23	−5	36
15	Radoslav Suchy	D	82	7	14	21	1	8
32	Cale Hulse	D	82	3	17	20	−4	123
14	Jeff Taffe	C	59	8	10	18	−8	20
8	Daniel Cleary	RW	68	6	11	17	−8	42
89	Mike Comrie†	C	28	8	7	15	−8	16
16	Mike Sillinger‡	C	60	8	6	14	−14	54
20	Fredrik Sjostrom	RW	57	7	6	13	−7	22
5	David Tanabe	D	45	5	7	12	4	22
36	Krys Kolanos	C	41	4	6	10	−9	24
12	Mike Johnson	RW	11	1	9	10	−1	10
18	Tyson Nash	LW	69	3	5	8	−6	110
4	Ossi Vaananen‡	D	67	2	4	6	−10	87
45	Brad Ference	D	63	0	5	5	−19	103
28	Landon Wilson‡	RW	35	1	3	4	−3	16
2	Derek Morris†	D	14	0	4	4	−5	2
44	Andrei Nazarov	LW	33	1	2	3	−7	125
7	Ivan Novoseltsev†	RW	17	2	0	2	−7	6
39	Erik Westrum	C	15	1	1	2	−3	20
1	Sean Burke‡	G	32	0	2	2		8
2	Todd Reirden†	D	7	0	2	2	−4	4
3	Bryan Helmer	D	17	0	1	1	−5	10
13	Michael Rupp†	C	6	0	1	1	−3	6
57	Goran Bezina	D	3	0	0	0	−1	2
35	Zac Bierk	G	4	0	0	0		2
33	Brian Boucher	G	40	0	0	0		2
21	Jason Jaspers	C	3	0	0	0	−1	2
1	Brent Johnson†	G	8	0	0	0		0
30	Jean-Marc Pelletier	G	4	0	0	0		0
6	Matthew Spiller	D	51	0	0	0	−11	54
43	Mike Stutzel	LW	9	0	0	0	−4	0

=== Goaltending ===
- † = Joined team via a transaction (e.g., trade, waivers, signing) during the season. Stats reflect time with the Coyotes only.
- ‡ = Left team via a transaction (e.g., trade, waivers, release) during the season. Stats reflect time with the Coyotes only.

No.	Player	Regular season									
No.	Player	GP	W	L	T	SA	GA	GAA	SV%	SO	TOI
33	Brian Boucher	40	10	19	10	1150	108	2.74	.906	5	2364
1	Sean Burke‡	32	10	15	5	913	84	2.81	.908	1	1795
1	Brent Johnson†	8	1	6	1	243	21	2.59	.914	0	486
30	Jean-Marc Pelletier	4	1	1	0	84	12	4.11	.857	0	175
35	Zac Bierk	4	0	1	2	108	12	3.79	.889	0	190

== Awards and records ==
=== Awards ===
Type	Award/honor	Recipient	Ref
League (in-season)	NHL All-Star Game selection	Shane Doan	
League (in-season)	NHL Defensive Player of the Week	Brian Boucher (January 5)	
League (in-season)	NHL Defensive Player of the Week	Brian Boucher (January 12)	
Team	Hardest Working Player Award	Cale Hulse	
Team	Leading Scorer Award	Shane Doan	
Team	Man of the Year Award	Shane Doan	
Team	Man of the Year Award	Tyson Nash	
Team	Team MVP Award	Shane Doan	
Team	Three-Star Award	Shane Doan	

=== Records ===
Brian Boucher set two modern day (since the 1943–44 season when the center ice red line was introduced) NHL records. From December 22, 2003, to January 11, 2004, Boucher went 332 minutes and 1 second without allowing a goal. From December 31, 2003, to January 9, 2004, Boucher recorded five shutouts in a row, which also set the modern day record for consecutive shutouts by a team.

=== Milestones ===
Milestone	Player	Date	Ref
First game	Matthew Spiller	October 10, 2003	
First game	Fredrik Sjostrom	November 30, 2003	
First game	Erik Westrum	March 7, 2004	
First game	Goran Bezina	March 10, 2004	
First game	Mike Stutzel	March 16, 2004	

== Transactions ==
The Coyotes were involved in the following transactions from June 10, 2003, the day after the deciding game of the 2003 Stanley Cup Final, through June 7, 2004, the day of the deciding game of the 2004 Stanley Cup Final.

=== Trades ===
Date	Details		Ref
June 21, 2003	To Carolina Hurricanes: Danny Markov; Conditional 4th-round pick in 2004	To Phoenix Coyotes: Igor Knyazev; David Tanabe	
June 21, 2003	To St. Louis Blues: Conditional draft pick (Note: Either a 5th-round pick in 2003 or Buffalo’s 4th-round pick in 2004. St. Louis chose the 2003 pick.)	To Phoenix Coyotes: Tyson Nash	
June 22, 2003	To Dallas Stars: 8th-round pick in 2004	To Phoenix Coyotes: 9th-round pick in 2003	
July 22, 2003	To Dallas Stars: Teppo Numminen	To Phoenix Coyotes: Mike Sillinger; Conditional draft pick	
July 25, 2003	To Vancouver Canucks: Martin Grenier	To Phoenix Coyotes: Bryan Helmer	
December 9, 2003	To Minnesota Wild: Michael Schutte	To Phoenix Coyotes: Chris Dyment	
December 30, 2003	To Florida Panthers: Future considerations	To Phoenix Coyotes: Ivan Novoseltsev	
January 19, 2004	To Anaheim Mighty Ducks: Future considerations	To Phoenix Coyotes: Todd Reirden	
February 9, 2004	To Philadelphia Flyers: Sean Burke; Branko Radivojevic; Rights to Ben Eager	To Phoenix Coyotes: Mike Comrie	
February 22, 2004	To Pittsburgh Penguins: Landon Wilson	To Phoenix Coyotes: Future considerations	
March 4, 2004	To St. Louis Blues: Mike Sillinger	To Phoenix Coyotes: Brent Johnson	
March 5, 2004	To New Jersey Devils: Jan Hrdina	To Phoenix Coyotes: Mike Rupp; 2nd-round pick in 2004	
March 9, 2004	To Colorado Avalanche: Chris Gratton; Ossi Vaananen; 2nd-round pick in 2005	To Phoenix Coyotes: Derek Morris; Rights to Keith Ballard	
March 9, 2004	To St. Louis Blues: Brian Savage	To Phoenix Coyotes: Future considerations	
March 9, 2004	To St. Louis Blues: Future considerations	To Phoenix Coyotes: Tom Koivisto	

=== Players acquired ===
Date	Player	Former team	Term	Via	Ref
July 10, 2003	Cale Hulse	Nashville Predators	multi-year	Free agency	
July 15, 2003	Daniel Cleary	Edmonton Oilers	multi-year	Free agency	
July 17, 2003	Chris Ferraro	Washington Capitals	1-year	Free agency	
July 17, 2003	Peter Ferraro	Washington Capitals	1-year	Free agency	
July 21, 2003	Nikos Tselios	Carolina Hurricanes	multi-year	Free agency	
September 23, 2003	Mike Wilson	New York Rangers	1-year	Free agency	
June 2, 2004	Dustin Wood	Springfield Falcons (AHL)	2-year	Free agency	

=== Players lost ===
Date	Player	New team	Via (Note: In parentheses is the player's free agency group on July 1 if applicable.)	Ref
June 30, 2003	Drake Berehowsky	Pittsburgh Penguins (Note: Berehowsky signed with Pittsburgh on August 29.)	Buyout	
July 1, 2003	Paul Ranheim (Note: Ranheim retired.)		Contract expiration (III)	
July 1, 2003	Ryan Lauzon (Note: Lauzon was inactive during the 2003–04 season.)		Contract expiration (UFA)	
July 31, 2003	Kelly Buchberger	Pittsburgh Penguins	Free agency (III)	
August 5, 2003	Deron Quint	Chicago Blackhawks	Free agency (UFA)	
August 26, 2003	Jay Leach	Reading Royals (ECHL)	Free agency (UFA)	
September 6, 2003	Francois Leroux		Retirement	
N/A	Peter Fabus	HK Dukla Trencin (SVK)	Free agency (UFA)	
October 3, 2003	Todd Simpson	Anaheim Mighty Ducks	Waiver draft	
October 3, 2003	Colin Zulianello	Long Beach Ice Dogs (ECHL)	Free agency (UFA)	
October 5, 2003	Brent Gauvreau	Mississippi Sea Wolves (ECHL)	Free agency (UFA)	
October 9, 2003	Scott Pellerin	Portland Pirates (AHL)	Free agency (III)	
October 10, 2003	Brad Ralph	Dayton Bombers (ECHL)	Free agency (UFA)	
October 22, 2003	Sergei Kuznetsov	Mississippi Sea Wolves (ECHL)	Free agency (UFA)	
November 30, 2003	Jason Bonsignore	South Carolina Stingrays (ECHL)	Free agency (UFA)	
February 11, 2004	Frank Banham	HC Dynamo Moscow (RSL) (Note: Banham signed with Dynamo Moscow on February 13.)	Release	
April 15, 2004	Tom Koivisto	Frolunda HC (SHL)	Free agency	

=== Signings ===
Date	Player	Term	Contract type	Ref
June 30, 2003	Teppo Numminen	1-year	Option exercised	
July 2, 2003	David LeNeveu	multi-year	Entry-level	
July 7, 2003	Landon Wilson	1-year	Re-signing	
July 14, 2003	Jakub Koreis	multi-year	Entry-level	
July 18, 2003	Tyson Nash	1-year	Re-signing	
July 28, 2003	Zac Bierk	1-year	Re-signing	
N/A	Bryan Helmer	1-year	Re-signing	
August 8, 2003	Daymond Langkow	1-year	Arbitration award	
August 9, 2003	Mike Johnson	1-year	Re-signing	
August 22, 2003	David Tanabe	multi-year	Re-signing	
August 25, 2003	Chris Gratton	1-year (Note: Club option for a second year.)	Re-signing	
September 8, 2003	Jan Hrdina	1-year	Re-signing	
September 26, 2003	Erik Westrum		Re-signing	
February 13, 2004	Shane Doan	3-year	Extension	
March 19, 2004	Joe Callahan	multi-year	Entry-level	
June 2, 2004	Lance Monych	3-year	Entry-level	

== Draft picks ==
Phoenix's draft picks at the 2003 NHL entry draft held at the Gaylord Entertainment Center in Nashville, Tennessee.

Round	#	Player	Nationality	College/Junior/Club team (League)
3	77	Tyler Redenbach	Canada	Swift Current Broncos (WHL)
3	80	Dmitri Pestunov	Russia	Metallurg Magnitogorsk (Russia)
4	115	Liam Lindstrom	Sweden	Mora IK (Sweden)
6	178	Ryan Gibbons	Canada	Seattle Thunderbirds (WHL)
7	208	Randall Gelech	Canada	Kelowna Rockets (WHL)
8	242	Eduard Lewandowski	Germany	Kolner Haie (Germany)
9	272	Sean Sullivan	United States	St. Sebastian's (USHS)
9	290	Loic Burkhalter	Switzerland	HC Ambri-Piotta (Switzerland)

== See also ==
- 2003–04 NHL season
