= 2003–04 Colorado Avalanche season =

National Hockey League team season

2003–04 Colorado Avalanche
- Division: 2nd Northwest
- Conference: 4th Western
- 2003–04 record: 40–22–13–7
- Home record: 19–14–6–2
- Road record: 21–8–7–5
- Goals for: 236
- Goals against: 198

Team information
- General manager: Pierre Lacroix
- Coach: Tony Granato
- Captain: Joe Sakic
- Alternate captains: Rob Blake; Adam Foote; Peter Forsberg
- Arena: Pepsi Center
- Average attendance: 18,007
- Minor league affiliate: Hershey Bears

Team leaders
- Goals: Milan Hejduk (35)
- Assists: Joe Sakic (54); Alex Tanguay (54)
- Points: Joe Sakic (87)
- Penalty minutes: Peter Worrell (179)
- Plus/minus: Alex Tanguay (+30)
- Wins: David Aebischer (32)
- Goals against average: David Aebischer (2.09)

The 2003–04 Colorado Avalanche season was the Avalanche's ninth season. For the first time since moving to Colorado, the Avalanche did not win their division. They defeated the Dallas Stars in the Quarterfinal round, but lost in the Semifinal round to the San Jose Sharks.

== Regular season ==
=== Final standings ===
Northwest Division
No.	CR		GP	W	L	T	OTL	GF	GA	PTS
1	3	**Vancouver Canucks**	82	43	24	10	5	235	194	101
2	4	**Colorado Avalanche**	82	40	22	13	7	235	198	100
3	6	**Calgary Flames**	82	42	30	7	3	200	176	94
4	9	Edmonton Oilers	82	36	29	12	5	221	208	89
5	10	Minnesota Wild	82	30	29	20	3	188	183	83

Note: CR = Conference rank; GP = Games played; W = Wins; L = Losses; T = Ties; OTL = Overtime loss; GF = Goals for; GA = Goals against; Pts = Points
Bolded teams qualified for the playoffs.

Western Conference
R		Div	GP	W	L	T	OTL	GF	GA	Pts
**1**	**P-** Detroit Red Wings	**CE**	**82**	**48**	**21**	**11**	**2**	**255**	**189**	109
**2**	**Y-** San Jose Sharks	**PA**	**82**	**43**	**21**	**12**	**6**	**255**	**183**	104
**3**	**Y-** Vancouver Canucks	**NW**	**82**	**43**	**24**	**10**	**5**	**235**	**194**	101
**4**	**X-** Colorado Avalanche	**NW**	**82**	**40**	**22**	**13**	**7**	**236**	**198**	100
**5**	**X-** Dallas Stars	**PA**	**82**	**41**	**26**	**13**	**2**	**194**	**175**	97
**6**	**X-** Calgary Flames	**NW**	**82**	**42**	**30**	**7**	**3**	**200**	**176**	94
**7**	**X-** St. Louis Blues	**CE**	**82**	**39**	**30**	**11**	**2**	**191**	**198**	91
**8**	**X-** Nashville Predators	**CE**	**82**	**38**	**29**	**11**	**4**	**216**	**217**	91
8.5
9	Edmonton Oilers	NW	82	36	29	12	5	221	208	89
10	Minnesota Wild	NW	82	30	29	20	3	188	183	83
11	Los Angeles Kings	PA	82	28	29	16	9	205	217	81
12	Mighty Ducks of Anaheim	PA	82	29	35	10	8	184	213	76
13	Phoenix Coyotes	PA	82	22	36	18	6	188	245	68
14	Columbus Blue Jackets	CE	82	25	45	8	4	177	238	62
15	Chicago Blackhawks	CE	82	20	43	11	8	188	259	59

Divisions: CE – Central, PA – Pacific, NW – Northwest

P – Clinched Presidents Trophy; Y – Clinched division; X – Clinched playoff spot

== Schedule and results ==
=== Regular season ===
2003–04 regular season
October: 5–4–0–0 (home: 3–3–0–0; road: 2–1–0–0)

Game	Date	Score	Opponent	Record	Recap
1	October 10, 2003	5–0	Chicago Blackhawks (2003–04)	1–0–0–0	W
2	October 12, 2003	1–2	St. Louis Blues (2003–04)	1–1–0–0	L
3	October 16, 2003	5–2	@ Minnesota Wild (2003–04)	2–1–0–0	W
4	October 18, 2003	3–6	@ Edmonton Oilers (2003–04)	2–2–0–0	L
5	October 21, 2003	1–4	Boston Bruins (2003–04)	2–3–0–0	L
6	October 23, 2003	6–1	Edmonton Oilers (2003–04)	3–3–0–0	W
7	October 25, 2003	5–3	@ Nashville Predators (2003–04)	4–3–0–0	W
8	October 26, 2003	1–3	Buffalo Sabres (2003–04)	4–4–0–0	L
9	October 28, 2003	4–2	Calgary Flames (2003–04)	5–4–0–0	W

November: 9–3–2–1 (home: 4–2–2–0; road: 5–1–0–1)

Game	Date	Score	Opponent	Record	Recap
10	November 1, 2003	3–4	@ New Jersey Devils (2003–04)	5–5–0–0	L
11	November 2, 2003	3–2 OT	@ New York Rangers (2003–04)	6–5–0–0	W
12	November 4, 2003	4–4 OT	Minnesota Wild (2003–04)	6–5–1–0	T
13	November 6, 2003	2–1	Phoenix Coyotes (2003–04)	7–5–1–0	W
14	November 9, 2003	4–3 OT	@ Chicago Blackhawks (2003–04)	8–5–1–0	W
15	November 11, 2003	4–3	@ San Jose Sharks (2003–04)	9–5–1–0	W
16	November 13, 2003	2–3 OT	@ Phoenix Coyotes (2003–04)	9–5–1–1	OTL
17	November 15, 2003	3–0	Dallas Stars (2003–04)	10–5–1–1	W
18	November 18, 2003	2–1 OT	Mighty Ducks of Anaheim (2003–04)	11–5–1–1	W
19	November 20, 2003	4–3	New York Rangers (2003–04)	12–5–1–1	W
20	November 22, 2003	0–2	Los Angeles Kings (2003–04)	12–6–1–1	L
21	November 24, 2003	2–3	Nashville Predators (2003–04)	12–7–1–1	L
22	November 27, 2003	6–5 OT	@ Calgary Flames (2003–04)	13–7–1–1	W
23	November 28, 2003	4–1	@ Edmonton Oilers (2003–04)	14–7–1–1	W
24	November 30, 2003	1–1 OT	New Jersey Devils (2003–04)	14–7–2–1	T

December: 4–3–5–0 (home: 3–2–0–0; road: 1–1–5–0)

Game	Date	Score	Opponent	Record	Recap
25	December 4, 2003	2–2 OT	@ San Jose Sharks (2003–04)	14–7–3–1	T
26	December 6, 2003	5–1	Columbus Blue Jackets (2003–04)	15–7–3–1	W
27	December 8, 2003	4–1	Washington Capitals (2003–04)	16–7–3–1	W
28	December 11, 2003	1–1 OT	@ Vancouver Canucks (2003–04)	16–7–4–1	T
29	December 13, 2003	1–1 OT	@ Calgary Flames (2003–04)	16–7–5–1	T
30	December 17, 2003	2–3	Minnesota Wild (2003–04)	16–8–5–1	L
31	December 19, 2003	0–1	@ Mighty Ducks of Anaheim (2003–04)	16–9–5–1	L
32	December 20, 2003	3–3 OT	@ Los Angeles Kings (2003–04)	16–9–6–1	T
33	December 26, 2003	3–3 OT	@ St. Louis Blues (2003–04)	16–9–7–1	T
34	December 27, 2003	3–2 OT	Philadelphia Flyers (2003–04)	17–9–7–1	W
35	December 29, 2003	2–3	Vancouver Canucks (2003–04)	17–10–7–1	L
36	December 31, 2003	2–1	@ Calgary Flames (2003–04)	18–10–7–1	W

January: 11–1–2–2 (home: 5–1–0–0; road: 6–0–2–2)

Game	Date	Score	Opponent	Record	Recap
37	January 2, 2004	4–2	@ Vancouver Canucks (2003–04)	19–10–7–1	W
38	January 4, 2004	3–1	Minnesota Wild (2003–04)	20–10–7–1	W
39	January 6, 2004	6–0	Columbus Blue Jackets (2003–04)	21–10–7–1	W
40	January 8, 2004	3–4 OT	@ Nashville Predators (2003–04)	21–10–7–2	OTL
41	January 10, 2004	4–2	@ Dallas Stars (2003–04)	22–10–7–2	W
42	January 11, 2004	5–4 OT	@ Chicago Blackhawks (2003–04)	23–10–7–2	W
43	January 13, 2004	3–1	Mighty Ducks of Anaheim (2003–04)	24–10–7–2	W
44	January 15, 2004	4–1	Dallas Stars (2003–04)	25–10–7–2	W
45	January 17, 2004	1–2	San Jose Sharks (2003–04)	25–11–7–2	L
46	January 19, 2004	5–4 OT	@ Tampa Bay Lightning (2003–04)	26–11–7–2	W
47	January 21, 2004	6–5	@ Florida Panthers (2003–04)	27–11–7–2	W
48	January 22, 2004	1–1 OT	@ Atlanta Thrashers (2003–04)	27–11–8–2	T
49	January 24, 2004	5–3	@ Pittsburgh Penguins (2003–04)	28–11–8–2	W
50	January 27, 2004	3–1	Edmonton Oilers (2003–04)	29–11–8–2	W
51	January 29, 2004	3–3 OT	@ Los Angeles Kings (2003–04)	29–11–9–2	T
52	January 30, 2004	3–4 OT	@ Mighty Ducks of Anaheim (2003–04)	29–11–9–3	OTL

February: 4–4–2–2 (home: 1–3–2–1; road: 3–1–0–1)

Game	Date	Score	Opponent	Record	Recap
53	February 3, 2004	3–1	Carolina Hurricanes (2003–04)	30–11–9–3	W
54	February 5, 2004	2–3 OT	Detroit Red Wings (2003–04)	30–11–9–4	OTL
55	February 10, 2004	1–1 OT	New York Islanders (2003–04)	30–11–10–4	T
56	February 12, 2004	4–0	@ St. Louis Blues (2003–04)	31–11–10–4	W
57	February 14, 2004	5–2	@ Detroit Red Wings (2003–04)	32–11–10–4	W
58	February 16, 2004	0–1	Vancouver Canucks (2003–04)	32–12–10–4	L
59	February 18, 2004	1–5	Edmonton Oilers (2003–04)	32–13–10–4	L
60	February 20, 2004	1–5	@ Dallas Stars (2003–04)	32–14–10–4	L
61	February 22, 2004	3–1	@ Minnesota Wild (2003–04)	33–14–10–4	W
62	February 24, 2004	0–2	Calgary Flames (2003–04)	33–15–10–4	L
63	February 26, 2004	2–2 OT	St. Louis Blues (2003–04)	33–15–11–4	T
64	February 28, 2004	4–5 OT	@ Columbus Blue Jackets (2003–04)	33–15–11–5	OTL

March: 6–7–2–1 (home: 3–3–2–0; road: 3–4–0–1)

Game	Date	Score	Opponent	Record	Recap
65	March 1, 2004	0–3	Tampa Bay Lightning (2003–04)	33–16–11–5	L
66	March 3, 2004	5–5 OT	Vancouver Canucks (2003–04)	33–16–12–5	T
67	March 5, 2004	5–1	San Jose Sharks (2003–04)	34–16–12–5	W
68	March 7, 2004	1–7	Calgary Flames (2003–04)	34–17–12–5	L
69	March 8, 2004	9–2	@ Vancouver Canucks (2003–04)	35–17–12–5	W
70	March 10, 2004	3–2 OT	@ Edmonton Oilers (2003–04)	36–17–12–5	W
71	March 12, 2004	3–2	@ Phoenix Coyotes (2003–04)	37–17–12–5	W
72	March 14, 2004	4–1	Phoenix Coyotes (2003–04)	38–17–12–5	W
73	March 16, 2004	2–4	@ Montreal Canadiens (2003–04)	38–18–12–5	L
74	March 18, 2004	0–2	@ Ottawa Senators (2003–04)	38–19–12–5	L
75	March 20, 2004	2–5	@ Toronto Maple Leafs (2003–04)	38–20–12–5	L
76	March 23, 2004	2–2 OT	Chicago Blackhawks (2003–04)	38–20–13–5	T
77	March 25, 2004	1–3	Detroit Red Wings (2003–04)	38–21–13–5	L
78	March 27, 2004	0–2	@ Detroit Red Wings (2003–04)	38–22–13–5	L
79	March 29, 2004	2–1	Los Angeles Kings (2003–04)	39–22–13–5	W
80	March 31, 2004	4–5 OT	@ Minnesota Wild (2003–04)	39–22–13–6	OTL

April: 1–0–0–1 (home: 0–0–0–1; road: 1–0–0–0)

Game	Date	Score	Opponent	Record	Recap
81	April 2, 2004	4–2	@ Columbus Blue Jackets (2003–04)	40–22–13–6	W
82	April 4, 2004	1–2 OT	Nashville Predators (2003–04)	40–22–13–7	OTL

Legend: W Win (2 points) L Loss (0 points) T Tie (1 point) OTL Overtime loss (1 point)

=== Playoffs ===
2004 Stanley Cup playoffs
Western Conference Quarterfinals vs. (5) Dallas Stars – Avalanche win 4–1

Game	Date	Visitor	Score	Home	OT	Decision	Attendance	Series	Recap
1	April 7	Dallas	1–3	Colorado		Aebischer	18,007	Avalanche lead 1–0	W
2	April 9	Dallas	2–5	Colorado		Aebischer	18,007	Avalanche lead 2–0	W
3	April 12	Colorado	3–4	Dallas	OT	Aebischer	18,532	Avalanche lead 2–1	L
4	April 14	Colorado	3–2	Dallas	2OT	Aebischer	18,532	Avalanche lead 3–1	W
5	April 17	Dallas	1–5	Colorado		Aebischer	18,007	Avalanche win 4–1	W

Western Conference Semifinals vs. (2) San Jose Sharks – Sharks win 4–2

Game	Date	Visitor	Score	Home	OT	Decision	Attendance	Series	Recap
1	April 22	Colorado	2–5	San Jose		Aebischer	17,496	Sharks lead 1–0	L
2	April 24	Colorado	1–4	San Jose		Aebischer	17,496	Sharks lead 2–0	L
3	April 26	San Jose	1–0	Colorado		Aebischer	18,007	Sharks lead 3–0	L
4	April 28	San Jose	0–1	Colorado	OT	Aebischer	18,007	Sharks lead 3–1	W
5	May 1	Colorado	2–1	San Jose	OT	Aebischer	17,496	Sharks lead 3–2	W
6	May 4	San Jose	3–1	Colorado		Aebischer	18,007	Sharks win 4–2	L

Legend: W Win L Loss

== Player statistics ==
=== Scoring ===
- Position abbreviations: C = Center; D = Defense; G = Goaltender; LW = Left wing; RW = Right wing
- † = Joined team via a transaction (e.g., trade, waivers, signing) during the season. Stats reflect time with the Avalanche only.
- ‡ = Left team via a transaction (e.g., trade, waivers, release) during the season. Stats reflect time with the Avalanche only.

No.	Player	Pos	Regular season						Playoffs					
No.	Player	Pos	GP	G	A	Pts	+/-	PIM	GP	G	A	Pts	+/-	PIM
19	Joe Sakic	C	81	33	54	87	11	42	11	7	5	12	0	8
18	Alex Tanguay	LW	69	25	54	79	30	42	8	2	2	4	1	2
23	Milan Hejduk	RW	82	35	40	75	19	20	11	5	2	7	6	0
21	Peter Forsberg	C	39	18	37	55	16	30	11	4	7	11	6	12
4	Rob Blake	D	74	13	33	46	6	61	9	0	5	5	0	6
22	Steve Konowalchuk†	LW	76	19	20	39	2	70	11	4	0	4	−4	12
9	Paul Kariya	LW	51	11	25	36	−5	22	1	0	1	1	−1	0
26	John-Michael Liles	D	79	10	24	34	7	28	11	0	1	1	1	4
8	Teemu Selanne	RW	78	16	16	32	2	32	10	0	3	3	−2	2
52	Adam Foote	D	73	8	22	30	13	87	11	0	4	4	−2	10
53	Derek Morris‡	D	69	6	22	28	4	47	—	—	—	—	—	—
41	Martin Skoula‡	D	58	2	14	16	2	30	—	—	—	—	—	—
3	Karlis Skrastins	D	82	5	8	13	18	26	11	0	2	2	−2	2
36	Steve Moore	C	57	5	7	12	−5	37	—	—	—	—	—	—
11	Andrei Nikolishin	C	49	5	7	12	3	24	11	0	2	2	−3	4
13	Dan Hinote	RW	59	4	7	11	−6	57	11	1	0	1	2	0
38	Matthew Barnaby†	RW	13	4	5	9	3	37	11	0	2	2	−3	27
60	Travis Brigley	LW	36	3	4	7	0	10	—	—	—	—	—	—
20 (Note: McCormick originally wore number 22 prior to Konowalchuk being acquired.)	Cody McCormick	C	44	2	3	5	−4	73	—	—	—	—	—	—
28	Peter Worrell	LW	49	3	1	4	2	179	—	—	—	—	—	—
15	Brad Larsen‡	LW	26	2	2	4	2	11	—	—	—	—	—	—
7	Darby Hendrickson†	C	20	1	3	4	−8	6	6	1	0	1	−1	2
24	Chris Gratton†	C	13	2	1	3	1	18	11	0	0	0	−1	27
17	Jim Cummins	RW	55	1	2	3	−5	147	—	—	—	—	—	—
40	Marek Svatos	RW	4	2	0	2	1	0	11	1	5	6	3	2
5	Brett Clark	D	12	1	1	2	3	6	—	—	—	—	—	—
38	Charlie Stephens‡	C	6	0	2	2	−1	4	—	—	—	—	—	—
1	David Aebischer	G	62	0	1	1		4	11	0	0	0		2
44	Bates Battaglia‡	LW	4	0	1	1	−1	4	—	—	—	—	—	—
32	Riku Hahl	C	28	0	1	1	−7	12	7	1	0	1	0	2
34	Kurt Sauer†	D	14	0	1	1	−3	19	3	0	0	0	0	0
37	Dennis Bonvie†	RW	1	0	0	0	0	0	—	—	—	—	—	—
6	Bob Boughner†	D	11	0	0	0	−1	8	11	0	4	4	5	6
37	Jordan Krestanovich‡	LW	14	0	0	0	0	6	—	—	—	—	—	—
43	Mikhail Kuleshov	LW	3	0	0	0	−1	0	—	—	—	—	—	—
24	Chris McAllister‡	D	34	0	0	0	−2	62	—	—	—	—	—	—
35	Tommy Salo†	G	5	0	0	0		0	1	0	0	0		2
30	Philippe Sauve	G	17	0	0	0		2	—	—	—	—	—	—
27	Ossi Vaananen†	D	12	0	0	0	−4	2	11	0	1	1	3	18

=== Goaltending ===
No.	Player	Regular season										Playoffs								
No.	Player	GP	W	L	T	SA	GA	GAA	SV%	SO	TOI	GP	W	L	SA	GA	GAA	SV%	SO	TOI
1	David Aebischer	62	32	19	9	1703	129	2.09	.924	4	3703	11	6	5	295	23	2.08	.922	1	662
30	Philippe Sauve	17	7	7	3	479	50	3.04	.896	0	986	—	—	—	—	—	—	—	—	—
35	Tommy Salo†	5	1	3	1	136	12	2.37	.912	0	304	1	0	0	7	0	0.00	1.000	0	27

== Awards and records ==
=== Awards ===
Type	Award/honor	Recipient	Ref
League (annual)	NHL All-Rookie Team	John-Michael Liles (Defense)	
League (annual)	NHL First All-Star Team	Joe Sakic (Center)	
League (annual)	NHL/Sheraton Road Performer Award	Joe Sakic	
League (in-season)	NHL All-Star Game selection	Rob Blake (Note: Blake was voted to the starting lineup.)	
League (in-season)	NHL All-Star Game selection	Joe Sakic	
League (in-season)	NHL All-Star Game selection	Alex Tanguay	
League (in-season)	NHL Offensive Player of the Week	Milan Hejduk (January 26)	
League (in-season)	NHL Offensive Player of the Week	Joe Sakic (March 15)	
League (in-season)	NHL YoungStars Game selection	Philippe Sauve	

=== Milestones ===
Milestone	Player	Date	Ref
First game	John-Michael Liles	October 10, 2003	
First game	Marek Svatos	October 10, 2003	
First game	Cody McCormick	October 12, 2003	
First game	Philippe Sauve	October 18, 2003	
First game	Mikhail Kuleshov	February 20, 2004	

== Transactions ==
The Avalanche were involved in the following transactions from June 10, 2003, the day after the deciding game of the 2003 Stanley Cup Finals, through June 7, 2004, the day of the deciding game of the 2004 Stanley Cup Finals.

=== Trades ===
Date	Details		Ref
June 21, 2003	To San Jose Sharks: Scott Parker	To Colorado Avalanche: Colorado’s 5th-round pick in 2003	
June 21, 2003	To Chicago Blackhawks: Future considerations (Note: 4th-round pick in 2004.)	To Colorado Avalanche: Andrei Nikolishin	
June 21, 2003	To Nashville Predators: Rights to Sergei Soin	To Colorado Avalanche: Rights to Tomas Slovak	
June 30, 2003	To Nashville Predators: Future considerations (Note: 3rd-round pick in 2004.)	To Colorado Avalanche: Karlis Skrastins	
July 3, 2003	To Buffalo Sabres: Steven Reinprecht	To Colorado Avalanche: Rights to Keith Ballard	
July 18, 2003	To Florida Panthers: Eric Messier; Vaclav Nedorost	To Colorado Avalanche: Peter Worrell; 2nd-round pick in 2004	
August 12, 2003	To Anaheim Mighty Ducks: Future considerations	To Colorado Avalanche: Travis Brigley	
October 22, 2003	To Washington Capitals: Bates Battaglia; Rights to Jonas Johansson	To Colorado Avalanche: Steve Konowalchuk; 3rd-round pick in 2004	
January 23, 2004	To Ottawa Senators: Charlie Stephens	To Colorado Avalanche: Dennis Bonvie	
February 20, 2004	To Carolina Hurricanes: Rights to Chris Bahen; Washington’s 3rd-round pick in 2004	To Colorado Avalanche: Bob Boughner	
February 21, 2004	To Anaheim Mighty Ducks: Martin Skoula	To Colorado Avalanche: Kurt Sauer; 4th-round pick in 2005	
February 25, 2004	To Minnesota Wild: 4th-round pick in 2005	To Colorado Avalanche: Darby Hendrickson; 8th-round pick in 2004	
March 8, 2004	To New York Rangers: Chris McAllister; Rights to David Liffiton; Florida’s 2nd-round pick in 2004	To Colorado Avalanche: Matthew Barnaby; 3rd-round pick in 2004	
March 9, 2004	To Edmonton Oilers: Rights to Tom Gilbert	To Colorado Avalanche: Tommy Salo; 6th-round pick in 2005	
March 9, 2004	To Phoenix Coyotes: Derek Morris; Rights to Keith Ballard	To Colorado Avalanche: Chris Gratton; Ossi Vaananen; 2nd-round pick in 2005	
March 9, 2004	To Minnesota Wild: Jordan Krestanovich	To Colorado Avalanche: Chris Bala	

=== Players acquired ===
Date	Player	Former team	Term	Via	Ref
July 3, 2003	Paul Kariya	Anaheim Mighty Ducks	1-year	Free agency	
July 3, 2003	Teemu Selanne	San Jose Sharks	1-year	Free agency	
September 26, 2003	Jim Cummins	New York Islanders	1-year	Free agency	

=== Players lost ===
Date	Player	New team	Via (Note: In parentheses is the player's free agency group on July 1 if applicable.)	Ref
July 1, 2003	K. C. Timmons (Note: Timmons was inactive during the 2003–04 season.)		Contract expiration (UFA)	
July 11, 2003	Mike Keane	Vancouver Canucks (Note: Keane signed with Vancouver on October 8.)	Buyout	
July 11, 2003	Bryan Marchment	Toronto Maple Leafs	Free agency (III)	
July 14, 2003	Greg de Vries	New York Rangers	Free agency (V)	
July 18, 2003	Brent Thompson	Colorado Eagles (CHL)	Free agency (UFA)	
July 29, 2003	Eric Bertrand	Krefeld Pinguine (DEL)	Free agency (VI)	
July 31, 2003	Bryan Muir	Los Angeles Kings	Free agency (UFA)	
August 19, 2003	Jeff Paul	Florida Panthers	Free agency (VI)	
August 19, 2003	Jeff Shantz	SCL Tigers (NLA)	Free agency (UFA)	
August 26, 2003	Steve Brule	Hershey Bears (AHL)	Free agency (VI)	
September 26, 2003	Dale Clarke	Tappara (Liiga)	Free agency (VI)	
October 3, 2003	Serge Aubin	Atlanta Thrashers	Waiver draft	
October 3, 2003	Brian Willsie	Washington Capitals	Waiver draft	
February 25, 2004	Brad Larsen	Atlanta Thrashers	Waivers	
June 3, 2004	Tommy Salo	Modo Hockey (SHL)	Free agency	
June 4, 2004	Andrei Nikolishin	HC CSKA Moscow (RSL)	Free agency	

=== Signings ===
Date	Player	Term	Contract type	Ref
June 25, 2003	Peter Forsberg	1-year	Re-signing	
June 26, 2003	Serge Aubin	1-year	Re-signing	
June 26, 2003	Derek Morris	1-year	Re-signing	
June 26, 2003	Phil Sauve	2-year	Re-signing	
June 26, 2003	D. J. Smith	1-year	Re-signing	
June 26, 2003	Mikko Viitanen	3-year	Entry-level	
July 2, 2003	Brian Willsie	1-year	Re-signing	
July 15, 2003	Bates Battaglia	1-year	Re-signing	
July 15, 2003	Karlis Skrastins	1-year	Re-signing	
July 15, 2003	Tomas Slovak	multi-year	Entry-level	
July 21, 2003	Peter Worrell	1-year	Re-signing	
August 8, 2003	Brett Clark	1-year	Re-signing	
August 8, 2003	Steve Moore	1-year	Re-signing	
September 6, 2003	Alex Tanguay	1-year	Re-signing	
June 2, 2004	Frantisek Skladany		Entry-level	
June 2, 2004	Tyler Weiman		Entry-level	

== Draft picks ==
Colorado's draft picks at the 2003 NHL entry draft held at the Gaylord Entertainment Center in Nashville, Tennessee.

Round	#	Player	Nationality	College/Junior/Club team (League)
2	63	David Liffiton	Canada	Plymouth Whalers (OHL)
4	131	David Svagrovsky	Czech Republic	Seattle Thunderbirds (WHL)
5	146	Mark McCutcheon	United States	New England Junior Falcons (EJHL)
5	163	Brad Richardson	Canada	Owen Sound Attack (OHL)
7	204	Linus Videll	Sweden	Sodertalje SK (Sweden)
7	225	Brett Hemingway	Canada	Coquitlam Express (BCHL)
8	257	Darryl Yacboski	Canada	Regina Pats (WHL)
9	288	David Jones	Canada	Coquitlam Express (BCHL)

== See also ==
- 2003–04 NHL season
