= Dmitri Kosmachev =

- Born: June 7, 1985 (age 41) Gorky, Soviet Union
- Height: 6 ft 4 in (193 cm)
- Weight: 227 lb (103 kg; 16 st 3 lb)
- Position: Defence
- Shot: Right
- Played for: CSKA Moscow; Torpedo Nizhny Novgorod; Atlant Moscow Oblast; Ak Bars Kazan; HC Neftekhimik Nizhnekamsk; Admiral Vladivostok; Amur Khabarovsk
- NHL draft: 71st overall, 2003; Columbus Blue Jackets
- Playing career: 2002–2017

Dmitri Evgeniyvich Kosmachev (Russian: Дми́трий Евге́ньевич Космачёв; born June 7, 1985) is a Russian former professional ice hockey defenseman who played in the Kontinental Hockey League (KHL).

Kosmachev was raised in the HC CSKA Moscow ice hockey system and made his Super League debut at just the age of 17. The young defenseman was drafted by the Columbus Blue Jackets in the third round of the 2003 National Hockey League Entry Draft with the 71st overall selection. He has since then played for HC CSKA and HC Khimik (Mytische) in the Super League.

== Career statistics ==
=== Regular season and playoffs ===
			Regular season					Playoffs
Season	Team	League	GP	G	A	Pts	PIM	GP	G	A	Pts	PIM
2000–01	Torpedo–2 Nizhny Novgorod	RUS.3	14	1	0	1	6	—	—	—	—	—
2001–02	CSKA Moscow	RUS.2	40	0	1	1	8	9	0	0	0	4
2001–02	CSKA–2 Moscow	RUS.3	6	1	0	1	2	—	—	—	—	—
2002–03	CSKA Moscow	RSL	27	0	0	0	2	—	—	—	—	—
2002–03	CSKA–2 Moscow	RUS.3	1	0	0	0	0	—	—	—	—	—
2003–04	CSKA Moscow	RSL	34	0	2	2	12	—	—	—	—	—
2003–04	CSKA–2 Moscow	RUS.3	17	0	3	3	10	—	—	—	—	—
2004–05	CSKA–2 Moscow	RUS.3	4	1	2	3	4	—	—	—	—	—
2004–05	Torpedo Nizhny Novgorod	RUS.2	34	3	4	7	22	15	0	1	1	0
2005–06	Khimik Moscow Oblast	RSL	38	2	2	4	14	9	0	0	0	4
2005–06	Kristall Elektrostal	RUS.3	11	2	0	2	2	—	—	—	—	—
2006–07	Khimik Moscow Oblast	RSL	32	0	0	0	18	9	0	0	0	2
2006–07	Khimik–2 Moscow Oblast	RUS.3	9	0	2	2	8	—	—	—	—	—
2007–08	Khimik Moscow Oblast	RSL	56	0	6	6	34	4	0	0	0	2
2007–08	Khimik–2 Moscow Oblast	RUS.3	2	0	0	0	2	—	—	—	—	—
2008–09	Ak Bars Kazan	KHL	28	0	3	3	39	—	—	—	—	—
2009–10	Torpedo Nizhny Novgorod	KHL	43	0	1	1	26	—	—	—	—	—
2010–11	HC Ryazan	VHL	7	0	0	0	6	—	—	—	—	—
2010–11	Toros Neftekamsk	VHL	23	3	0	3	24	12	2	1	3	22
2011–12	Atlant Moscow Oblast	KHL	41	1	2	3	22	6	0	0	0	2
2012–13	Atlant Moscow Oblast	KHL	39	1	2	3	10	5	0	1	1	2
2013–14	Neftekhimik Nizhnekamsk	KHL	49	3	11	14	20	—	—	—	—	—
2014–15	Neftekhimik Nizhnekamsk	KHL	43	1	3	4	36	—	—	—	—	—
2015–16	Admiral Vladivostok	KHL	38	0	1	1	39	1	0	0	0	0
2016–17	Amur Khabarovsk	KHL	40	1	2	3	18	—	—	—	—	—
RSL totals			187	2	10	12	80	22	0	0	0	8
KHL totals			321	7	25	32	210	12	0	1	1	4

=== International ===
Year	Team	Event	Result	GP	G	A	Pts	PIM
2002	Russia	WJC18	2nd place, silver medalist(s)	8	0	1	1	2
2003	Russia	WJC18	3rd place, bronze medalist(s)	6	0	1	1	6
2004	Russia	WJC	5th	6	0	0	0	2
Junior totals				20	0	2	2	10
