= Todd Rohloff =

American ice hockey player (born 1974)

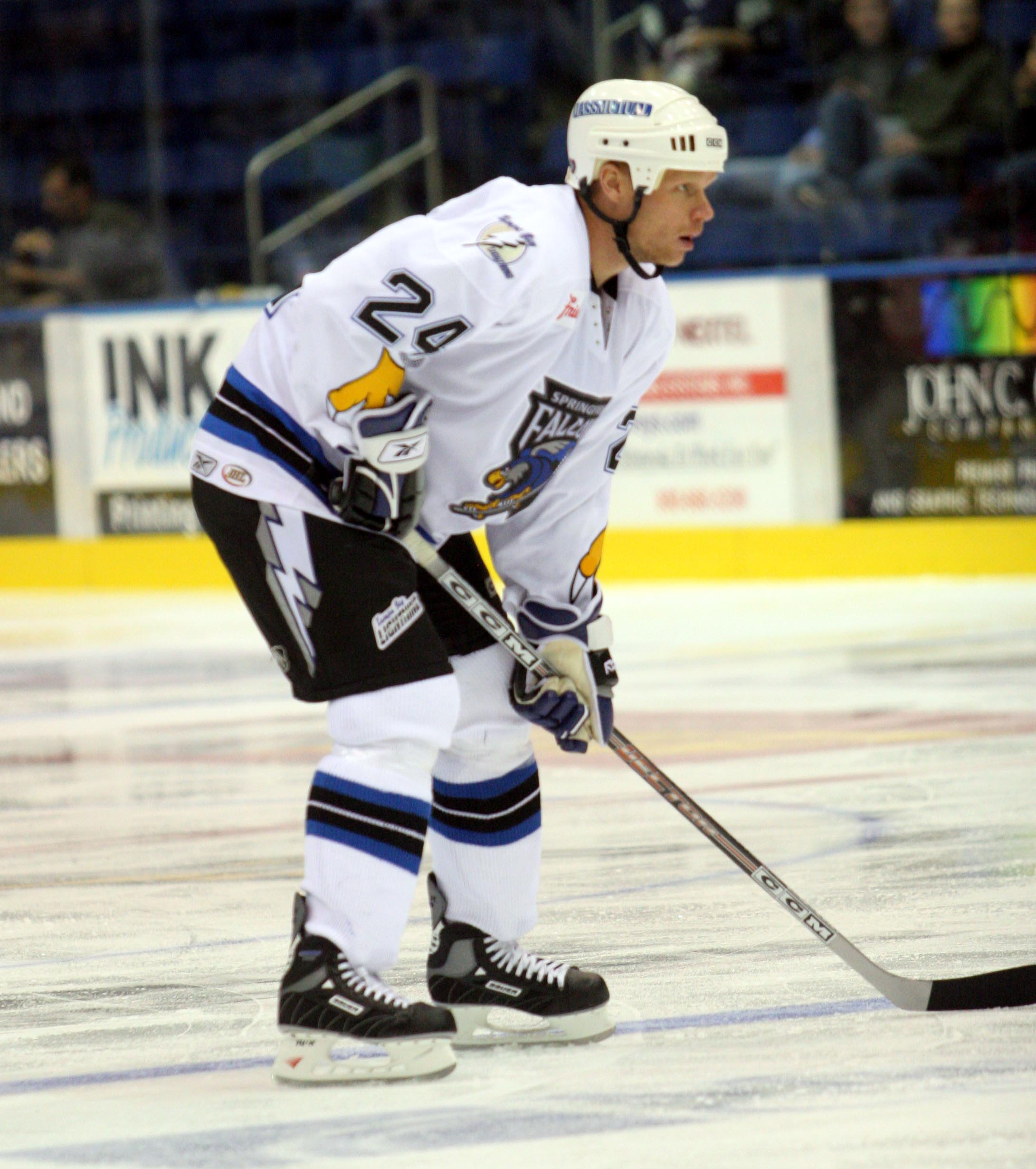
- Rohloff with the Springfield Falcons in 2005
- Born: January 16, 1974 (age 52) Grand Rapids, Minnesota, U.S.
- Height: 6 ft 3 in (191 cm)
- Weight: 213 lb (97 kg; 15 st 3 lb)
- Position: Defense
- Shot: Left
- Played for: Washington Capitals; Columbus Blue Jackets
- National team: United States
- NHL draft: Undrafted
- Playing career: 1998–2006

Todd Clifford Rohloff (born January 16, 1974) is an American former professional ice hockey defenseman who played two seasons in the National Hockey League (NHL) with the Washington Capitals and the Columbus Blue Jackets between 2002 and 2004. The rest of his career, which lasted from 1998 to 2006, was spent in various minor leagues. He also played for the American national team at the 2002 World Championship.

== College career ==
Rohloff played junior hockey for the St. Paul Vulcans of the United States Hockey League before signing to play college hockey for Miami University in Oxford, Ohio. Rohloff established himself as a defensive fixture for Miami, helping the 1996–97 team to the 1997 NCAA Division I Men's Ice Hockey Tournament with a 27-11-3 record, with fellow defenseman Dan Boyle (First-Team All-American, 54 points) and center Randy Robitaille (First-Team All-American, 61 points). Miami lost to Cornell 4-2 in the regional quarterfinals played at Van Andel Arena in Grand Rapids, Michigan. Rohloff was voted the outstanding defensive player for Miami in 1996-97 and 1997–98, and captained the team in his senior year.

== Professional career ==
Undrafted out of college, Rohloff began his professional career with the Indianapolis Ice of the International Hockey League, advancing to the Portland Pirates of the American Hockey League (AHL) in 1998–99. Playing time with Portland would result in a promotion to the Washington Capitals with his NHL debut on January 9, 2002, with Rohloff posting an assist in a 6–3 victory over Columbus. He signed with Columbus for the 2003–04 season, seeing time with the NHL club while splitting time with the Syracuse Crunch of the AHL. He spent the next two seasons in the AHL with the Rochester Americans in 2004–05 and the Springfield Falcons in 2005–06.

Rohloff retired after the 2005–06 season.

== Personal life ==
Rohloff graduated from Miami with a degree in mass communications, and later worked for a construction and forestry equipment firm. He lived in Grand Rapids, Minnesota, with his family.

== Career statistics ==
=== Regular season and playoffs ===
			Regular season					Playoffs
Season	Team	League	GP	G	A	Pts	PIM	GP	G	A	Pts	PIM
1990–91	Grand Rapids High School	HS-MN	—	—	—	—	—	—	—	—	—	—
1992–93	St. Paul Vulcans	USHL	33	2	9	11	52	—	—	—	—	—
1993–94	St. Paul Vulcans	USHL	47	4	22	26	—	—	—	—	—	—
1994–95	Miami University	CCHA	38	1	6	7	22	—	—	—	—	—
1995–96	Miami University	CCHA	23	2	4	6	24	—	—	—	—	—
1996–97	Miami University	CCHA	38	2	12	14	48	—	—	—	—	—
1997–98	Miami University	CCHA	17	2	5	7	38	—	—	—	—	—
1997–98	Indianapolis Ice	IHL	5	0	1	1	6	1	0	0	0	0
1998–99	Portland Pirates	AHL	58	1	6	7	58	—	—	—	—	—
1998–99	Indianapolis Ice	IHL	12	2	0	2	8	5	1	1	2	6
1999–00	Cleveland Lumberjacks	IHL	77	1	13	14	88	9	0	0	0	6
2000–01	Portland Pirates	AHL	58	3	8	11	59	3	0	0	0	2
2001–02	Washington Capitals	NHL	16	0	1	1	14	—	—	—	—	—
2001–02	Portland Pirates	AHL	17	1	3	4	22	—	—	—	—	—
2002–03	Portland Pirates	AHL	64	2	10	12	65	3	0	0	0	2
2003–04	Columbus Blue Jackets	NHL	24	0	2	2	8	—	—	—	—	—
2003–04	Washington Capitals	NHL	35	0	3	3	18	—	—	—	—	—
2003–04	Syracuse Crunch	AHL	14	1	5	6	16	—	—	—	—	—
2004–05	Rochester Americans	AHL	12	0	1	1	4	—	—	—	—	—
2005–06	Springfield Falcons	AHL	64	0	13	13	80	—	—	—	—	—
AHL totals			287	8	46	54	304	6	0	0	0	4
NHL totals			75	0	6	6	40	—	—	—	—	—

=== International ===
Year	Team	Event	GP	G	A	Pts	PIM
2002	United States	WC	5	1	3	4	4
Senior totals			7	0	1	1	2
