= Kip Brennan =

Canadian ice hockey player (born 1980)

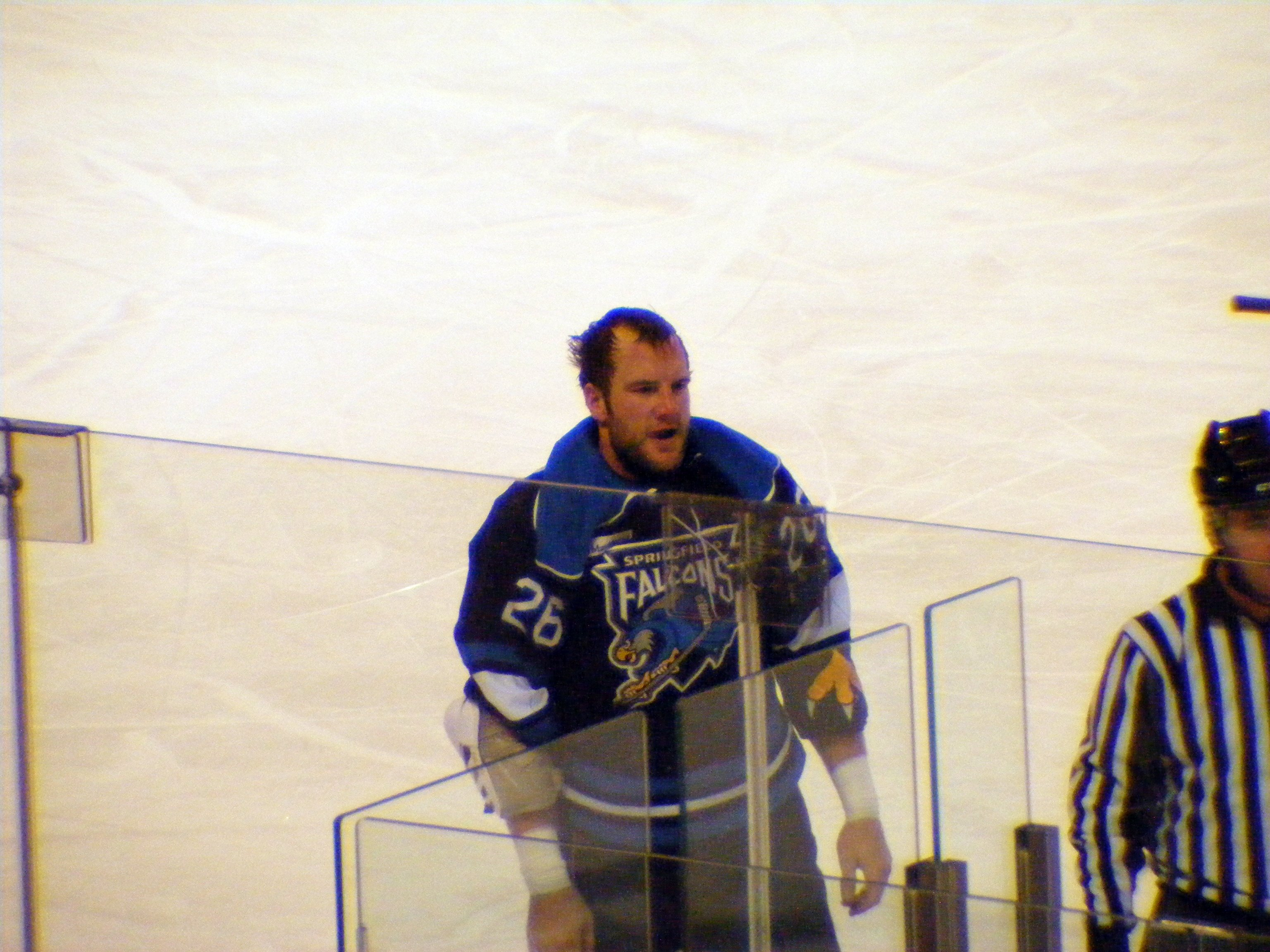
- Born: August 27, 1980 (age 45) Kingston, Ontario, Canada
- Height: 6 ft 4 in (193 cm)
- Weight: 222 lb (101 kg; 15 st 12 lb)
- Position: Left wing
- Shot: Left
- Played for: Los Angeles Kings; Atlanta Thrashers; Mighty Ducks of Anaheim; New York Islanders; HIFK; Vityaz Chekhov
- NHL draft: 103rd overall, 1998; Los Angeles Kings
- Playing career: 2000–2014

Kip Brennan (born August 27, 1980) is a Canadian former professional ice hockey forward. Brennan played for the Los Angeles Kings, Atlanta Thrashers, Mighty Ducks of Anaheim and the New York Islanders in the National Hockey League (NHL). He was mostly known as an enforcer.

== Playing career ==
Kip Brennan played in the OHL with the Windsor Spitfires and Sudbury Wolves from 1996–2001. He led the Wolves in penalty minutes for the 1999–2000 season with 228 regular season PIM and 67 playoff PIM. In 2001, he split time with the Lowell Lock Monsters, of the AHL, and the Sudbury Wolves, OHL. The 2001–2002 season would give Kip his first taste of the NHL. He skated in 4 games for the LA Kings and picked up 22 PIM. For the remainder of the season he played for the Manchester Monarchs, the AHL affiliate for the Los Angeles Kings. He led the team in PIM with 269.

In 2002–03 and 2003–04, he was back and forth between the Kings and Monarchs. Kip again led the Monarchs with 198 PIM for the 2002–03 season. On December 27, 2003, the NHL suspended Brennan for 10 games without pay during a game against the San Jose Sharks. Brennan had returned to the ice after officials had ejected him for roughing an opponent. The suspension cost him about $25,000. He also played for the Atlanta Thrashers of the NHL for 5 games during the 2003–04 season. 2004–05, he played exclusively for the Chicago Wolves of the AHL, leading the team in PIM with 267 during the regular season and 105 PIM in the playoffs. 2005–06, he played for the Mighty Ducks of Anaheim, NHL, and the Portland Pirates, AHL.

He briefly attended the Dallas Stars training camp in September 2006. Then for the 2006–07 season, Kip skated 1 game for the Toronto Marlies in the AHL, 11 games for the Long Beach Ice Dogs in the ECHL, and then finished the season with the Hershey Bears. He then signed with the New York Islanders, playing 3 games with the team, spending most of the season with the Bridgeport Sound Tigers.

Brennan then signed with HIFK in Finland's SM-liiga, but on 16 December 2008, he left the team and returned to Hershey Bears.

On November 11, 2013, Brennan returned to Russia to sign a one-year contract with Saryarka Karaganda of the Higher Hockey League. In 10 games Brennan totalled 35 penalty minutes in hindering Karaganda advance to the post-season.

== Career statistics ==
			Regular season					Playoffs
Season	Team	League	GP	G	A	Pts	PIM	GP	G	A	Pts	PIM
1995–96	St. Michael's Buzzers	OJHL	40	0	11	11	155	7	0	1	1	20
1996–97	Windsor Spitfires	OHL	42	0	10	10	156	5	0	1	1	16
1997–98	Windsor Spitfires	OHL	24	0	7	7	103	—	—	—	—	—
1997–98	Sudbury Wolves	OHL	23	0	3	3	85	—	—	—	—	—
1998–99	Sudbury Wolves	OHL	38	9	12	21	160	—	—	—	—	—
1999–00	Sudbury Wolves	OHL	55	16	16	32	228	12	3	3	6	67
2000–01	Lowell Lock Monsters	AHL	23	2	3	5	117	—	—	—	—	—
2000–01	Sudbury Wolves	OHL	27	7	14	21	94	12	5	6	11	92
2001–02	Manchester Monarchs	AHL	44	4	1	5	269	4	0	1	1	26
2001–02	Los Angeles Kings	NHL	4	0	0	0	22	—	—	—	—	—
2002–03	Manchester Monarchs	AHL	35	3	2	5	195	3	0	0	0	0
2002–03	Los Angeles Kings	NHL	19	0	0	0	57	—	—	—	—	—
2003–04	Manchester Monarchs	AHL	2	0	0	0	0	—	—	—	—	—
2003–04	Los Angeles Kings	NHL	18	1	0	1	79	—	—	—	—	—
2003–04	Atlanta Thrashers	NHL	5	0	0	0	17	—	—	—	—	—
2004–05	Chicago Wolves	AHL	48	7	6	13	267	18	1	1	2	105
2005–06	Portland Pirates	AHL	9	2	1	3	22	—	—	—	—	—
2005–06	Mighty Ducks of Anaheim	NHL	12	0	1	1	35	—	—	—	—	—
2006–07	Toronto Marlies	AHL	1	0	0	0	6	—	—	—	—	—
2006–07	Long Beach Ice Dogs	ECHL	11	2	3	5	74	—	—	—	—	—
2006–07	Hershey Bears	AHL	26	4	2	6	67	6	0	1	1	30
2007–08	Bridgeport Sound Tigers	AHL	49	2	1	3	247	—	—	—	—	—
2007–08	New York Islanders	NHL	3	0	0	0	12	—	—	—	—	—
2008–09	HIFK	SM-l	22	0	3	3	118	—	—	—	—	—
2008–09	South Carolina Stingrays	ECHL	3	0	0	0	16	—	—	—	—	—
2008–09	Hershey Bears	AHL	22	1	3	4	88	1	0	0	0	4
2009–10	Springfield Falcons	AHL	53	0	3	3	263	—	—	—	—	—
2010–11	Chicago Wolves	AHL	12	1	0	1	40	—	—	—	—	—
2010–11	Allen Americans	CHL	31	8	13	21	146	13	0	3	3	52
2011–12	Vityaz Chekhov	KHL	14	1	0	1	240	—	—	—	—	—
2012–13	Allen Americans	CHL	30	4	2	6	114	—	—	—	—	—
2012–13	Arizona Sundogs	CHL	15	2	0	2	40	4	0	1	1	5
2013–14	Saryarka Karagandy	VHL	10	0	2	2	35	7	0	0	0	29
AHL totals			324	26	22	48	1587	32	1	3	4	165
NHL totals			61	1	1	2	222	—	—	—	—	—
