= 2003–04 Florida Panthers season =

National Hockey League team season

2003–04 Florida Panthers
- Division: 4th Southeast
- Conference: 12th Eastern
- 2003–04 record: 28–35–15–4
- Home record: 16–15–7–3
- Road record: 12–20–8–1
- Goals for: 188
- Goals against: 221

Team information
- General manager: Rick Dudley
- Coach: Mike Keenan (Oct.–Nov.); Rick Dudley (Nov.–Feb.); John Torchetti (Feb.–Apr.)
- Captain: Olli Jokinen
- Alternate captains: Viktor Kozlov (Oct.–Mar.); Marcus Nilson (Oct.–Mar.); Lyle Odelein
- Arena: Office Depot Center
- Average attendance: 15,936
- Minor league affiliates: San Antonio Rampage; Augusta Lynx

Team leaders
- Goals: Olli Jokinen (26)
- Assists: Olli Jokinen (32)
- Points: Olli Jokinen (58)
- Penalty minutes: Darcy Hordichuk (158)
- Plus/minus: Pavel Trnka (+2)
- Wins: Roberto Luongo (25)
- Goals against average: Roberto Luongo (2.43)

The 2003–04 Florida Panthers season was their eleventh season in the National Hockey League (NHL). The Panthers failed to qualify for the playoffs for the fourth consecutive season for the first time in franchise history.

== Offseason ==
Olli Jokinen was named team captain on October 7, 2003.

== Regular season ==
On November 9, 2003, head coach Mike Keenan was fired after leading the Panthers to a 5–8–2–0 start. General manager Rick Dudley assumed coaching duties on an interim basis through February 9, 2004, when assistant coach John Torchetti was named interim head coach.

The Panthers season finale against the Carolina Hurricanes on April 4, 2004, was the final tie in NHL history. Ties were eliminated after the 2004–05 NHL lockout when the shootout was adopted.

=== Final standings ===
Southeast Division
No.	CR		GP	W	L	T	OTL	GF	GA	PTS
1	1	**Tampa Bay Lightning**	82	46	22	8	6	245	192	106
2	10	Atlanta Thrashers	82	33	37	8	4	214	243	78
3	11	Carolina Hurricanes	82	28	34	14	6	172	209	76
4	12	Florida Panthers	82	28	35	15	4	188	221	75
5	14	Washington Capitals	82	23	46	10	3	186	253	59

Note: CR = Conference rank; GP = Games played; W = Wins; L = Losses; T = Ties; OTL = Overtime loss; GF = Goals for; GA = Goals against; Pts = Points
Bolded teams qualified for the playoffs.

Eastern Conference
R		Div	GP	W	L	T	OTL	GF	GA	Pts
**1**	**Z-** Tampa Bay Lightning	**SE**	**82**	**46**	**22**	**8**	**6**	**245**	**192**	106
**2**	**Y-** Boston Bruins	**NE**	**82**	**41**	**19**	**15**	**7**	**209**	**188**	104
**3**	**Y-** Philadelphia Flyers	**AT**	**82**	**40**	**21**	**15**	**6**	**209**	**188**	101
**4**	**X-** Toronto Maple Leafs	**NE**	**82**	**45**	**24**	**10**	**3**	**242**	**204**	103
**5**	**X-** Ottawa Senators	**NE**	**82**	**43**	**23**	**10**	**6**	**262**	**189**	102
**6**	**X-** New Jersey Devils	**AT**	**82**	**43**	**25**	**12**	**2**	**213**	**164**	100
**7**	**X-** Montreal Canadiens	**NE**	**82**	**41**	**30**	**7**	**4**	**208**	**192**	93
**8**	**X-** New York Islanders	**AT**	**82**	**38**	**29**	**11**	**4**	**237**	**210**	91
8.5
9	Buffalo Sabres	NE	82	37	34	7	4	220	221	85
10	Atlanta Thrashers	SE	82	33	37	8	4	214	243	78
11	Carolina Hurricanes	SE	82	28	34	14	6	172	209	76
12	Florida Panthers	SE	82	28	35	15	4	188	221	75
13	New York Rangers	AT	82	27	40	7	8	206	250	69
14	Washington Capitals	SE	82	23	46	10	3	186	253	59
15	Pittsburgh Penguins	AT	82	23	47	8	4	190	303	58

Divisions: AT – Atlantic, NE – Northeast, SE – Southeast

Z – Clinched conference; Y – Clinched division; X – Clinched playoff spot

== Schedule and results ==
2003–04 regular season
October: 4–5–2–0 (home: 1–2–1–0; road: 3–3–1–0)

Game	Date	Score	Opponent	Record	Recap
1	October 9, 2003	3–1	Carolina Hurricanes (2003–04)	1–0–0–0	W
2	October 11, 2003	1–1 OT	Boston Bruins (2003–04)	1–0–1–0	T
3	October 13, 2003	2–2 OT	@ Carolina Hurricanes (2003–04)	1–0–2–0	T
4	October 15, 2003	1–2	Phoenix Coyotes (2003–04)	1–1–2–0	L
5	October 18, 2003	1–2	@ New York Islanders (2003–04)	1–2–2–0	L
6	October 20, 2003	1–3	@ New York Rangers (2003–04)	1–3–2–0	L
7	October 22, 2003	2–1	@ New Jersey Devils (2003–04)	2–3–2–0	W
8	October 24, 2003	3–4	Minnesota Wild (2003–04)	2–4–2–0	L
9	October 25, 2003	3–2	@ Atlanta Thrashers (2003–04)	3–4–2–0	W
10	October 29, 2003	1–5	@ Philadelphia Flyers (2003–04)	3–5–2–0	L
11	October 30, 2003	3–2	@ Ottawa Senators (2003–04)	4–5–2–0	W

November: 5–8–2–0 (home: 3–4–1–0; road: 2–4–1–0)

Game	Date	Score	Opponent	Record	Recap
12	November 1, 2003	2–6	San Jose Sharks (2003–04)	4–6–2–0	L
13	November 5, 2003	2–3	Los Angeles Kings (2003–04)	4–7–2–0	L
14	November 7, 2003	6–3	Pittsburgh Penguins (2003–04)	5–7–2–0	W
15	November 8, 2003	0–2	@ St. Louis Blues (2003–04)	5–8–2–0	L
16	November 11, 2003	4–0	Tampa Bay Lightning (2003–04)	6–8–2–0	W
17	November 13, 2003	1–3	@ New Jersey Devils (2003–04)	6–9–2–0	L
18	November 15, 2003	3–2	@ Pittsburgh Penguins (2003–04)	7–9–2–0	W
19	November 16, 2003	2–5	@ Atlanta Thrashers (2003–04)	7–10–2–0	L
20	November 19, 2003	1–4	New York Islanders (2003–04)	7–11–2–0	L
21	November 21, 2003	3–6	Atlanta Thrashers (2003–04)	7–12–2–0	L
22	November 22, 2003	3–2 OT	@ Washington Capitals (2003–04)	8–12–2–0	W
23	November 24, 2003	2–1	Buffalo Sabres (2003–04)	9–12–2–0	W
24	November 26, 2003	3–3 OT	New York Rangers (2003–04)	9–12–3–0	T
25	November 28, 2003	3–4	@ Buffalo Sabres (2003–04)	9–13–3–0	L
26	November 29, 2003	1–1 OT	@ Montreal Canadiens (2003–04)	9–13–4–0	T

December: 3–3–5–2 (home: 3–1–3–1; road: 0–2–2–1)

Game	Date	Score	Opponent	Record	Recap
27	December 3, 2003	0–4	Ottawa Senators (2003–04)	9–14–4–0	L
28	December 6, 2003	3–4 OT	Atlanta Thrashers (2003–04)	9–14–4–1	OTL
29	December 10, 2003	1–1 OT	Boston Bruins (2003–04)	9–14–5–1	T
30	December 12, 2003	4–2	Montreal Canadiens (2003–04)	10–14–5–1	W
31	December 13, 2003	2–2 OT	@ Nashville Predators (2003–04)	10–14–6–1	T
32	December 15, 2003	1–4	@ Detroit Red Wings (2003–04)	10–15–6–1	L
33	December 17, 2003	2–2 OT	Washington Capitals (2003–04)	10–15–7–1	T
34	December 19, 2003	1–0	Dallas Stars (2003–04)	11–15–7–1	W
35	December 22, 2003	2–3 OT	@ Ottawa Senators (2003–04)	11–15–7–2	OTL
36	December 23, 2003	2–5	@ Toronto Maple Leafs (2003–04)	11–16–7–2	L
37	December 27, 2003	3–2	Mighty Ducks of Anaheim (2003–04)	12–16–7–2	W
38	December 29, 2003	4–4 OT	Toronto Maple Leafs (2003–04)	12–16–8–2	T
39	December 31, 2003	2–2 OT	@ Tampa Bay Lightning (2003–04)	12–16–9–2	T

January: 5–6–2–1 (home: 3–2–1–1; road: 2–4–1–0)

Game	Date	Score	Opponent	Record	Recap
40	January 2, 2004	1–2	Philadelphia Flyers (2003–04)	12–17–9–2	L
41	January 3, 2004	1–0	Columbus Blue Jackets (2003–04)	13–17–9–2	W
42	January 8, 2004	4–3 OT	@ Philadelphia Flyers (2003–04)	14–17–9–2	W
43	January 10, 2004	2–4	@ Calgary Flames (2003–04)	14–18–9–2	L
44	January 11, 2004	2–2 OT	@ Vancouver Canucks (2003–04)	14–18–10–2	T
45	January 13, 2004	2–4	@ Edmonton Oilers (2003–04)	14–19–10–2	L
46	January 17, 2004	2–1	Tampa Bay Lightning (2003–04)	15–19–10–2	W
47	January 19, 2004	1–2 OT	St. Louis Blues (2003–04)	15–19–10–3	OTL
48	January 21, 2004	5–6	Colorado Avalanche (2003–04)	15–20–10–3	L
49	January 23, 2004	4–1	Washington Capitals (2003–04)	16–20–10–3	W
50	January 24, 2004	2–1	@ Boston Bruins (2003–04)	17–20–10–3	W
51	January 26, 2004	2–5	@ New York Rangers (2003–04)	17–21–10–3	L
52	January 28, 2004	3–3 OT	Philadelphia Flyers (2003–04)	17–21–11–3	T
53	January 31, 2004	2–4	@ New York Islanders (2003–04)	17–22–11–3	L

February: 6–4–3–0 (home: 3–1–0–0; road: 3–3–3–0)

Game	Date	Score	Opponent	Record	Recap
54	February 3, 2004	0–3	@ San Jose Sharks (2003–04)	17–23–11–3	L
55	February 4, 2004	5–4 OT	@ Phoenix Coyotes (2003–04)	18–23–11–3	W
56	February 10, 2004	2–1	Montreal Canadiens (2003–04)	19–23–11–3	W
57	February 12, 2004	5–1	Pittsburgh Penguins (2003–04)	20–23–11–3	W
58	February 14, 2004	2–3	@ Tampa Bay Lightning (2003–04)	20–24–11–3	L
59	February 16, 2004	1–3	@ Carolina Hurricanes (2003–04)	20–25–11–3	L
60	February 18, 2004	1–1 OT	@ Buffalo Sabres (2003–04)	20–25–12–3	T
61	February 20, 2004	2–0	@ Pittsburgh Penguins (2003–04)	21–25–12–3	W
62	February 21, 2004	2–2 OT	@ Washington Capitals (2003–04)	21–25–13–3	T
63	February 23, 2004	2–0	@ Boston Bruins (2003–04)	22–25–13–3	W
64	February 25, 2004	4–0	Toronto Maple Leafs (2003–04)	23–25–13–3	W
65	February 27, 2004	1–4	Washington Capitals (2003–04)	23–26–13–3	L
66	February 29, 2004	2–2 OT	@ Chicago Blackhawks (2003–04)	23–26–14–3	T

March: 5–8–0–1 (home: 3–5–0–1; road: 2–3–0–0)

Game	Date	Score	Opponent	Record	Recap
67	March 2, 2004	1–0	@ Washington Capitals (2003–04)	24–26–14–3	W
68	March 3, 2004	2–5	New Jersey Devils (2003–04)	24–27–14–3	L
69	March 6, 2004	3–5	Tampa Bay Lightning (2003–04)	24–28–14–3	L
70	March 9, 2004	0–5	@ Toronto Maple Leafs (2003–04)	24–29–14–3	L
71	March 11, 2004	3–2 OT	@ Montreal Canadiens (2003–04)	25–29–14–3	W
72	March 13, 2004	3–2 OT	New York Rangers (2003–04)	26–29–14–3	W
73	March 17, 2004	6–4	New York Islanders (2003–04)	27–29–14–3	W
74	March 19, 2004	2–3	@ Atlanta Thrashers (2003–04)	27–30–14–3	L
75	March 20, 2004	1–2	Buffalo Sabres (2003–04)	27–31–14–3	L
76	March 23, 2004	3–4 OT	New Jersey Devils (2003–04)	27–31–14–4	OTL
77	March 25, 2004	2–3	@ Carolina Hurricanes (2003–04)	27–32–14–4	L
78	March 27, 2004	0–3	Atlanta Thrashers (2003–04)	27–33–14–4	L
79	March 29, 2004	3–1	Carolina Hurricanes (2003–04)	28–33–14–4	W
80	March 31, 2004	4–5	Ottawa Senators (2003–04)	28–34–14–4	L

April: 0–1–1–0 (home: 0–0–1–0; road: 0–1–0–0)

Game	Date	Score	Opponent	Record	Recap
81	April 1, 2004	3–4	@ Tampa Bay Lightning (2003–04)	28–35–14–4	L
82	April 4, 2004	6–6 OT	Carolina Hurricanes (2003–04)	28–35–15–4	T

Legend: W Win (2 points) L Loss (0 points) T Tie (1 point) OTL Overtime loss (1 point)

== Player statistics ==
=== Scoring ===
- Position abbreviations: C = Center; D = Defense; G = Goaltender; LW = Left wing; RW = Right wing
- † = Joined team via a transaction (e.g., trade, waivers, signing) during the season. Stats reflect time with the Panthers only.
- ‡ = Left team via a transaction (e.g., trade, waivers, release) during the season. Stats reflect time with the Panthers only.

No.	Player	Pos	Regular season					
No.	Player	Pos	GP	G	A	Pts	+/-	PIM
12	Olli Jokinen	C	82	26	32	58	−16	81
8	Valeri Bure‡	RW	55	20	25	45	0	20
26	Mike Van Ryn	D	79	13	24	37	−16	52
22	Kristian Huselius	LW	76	10	21	31	−6	24
9	Stephen Weiss	C	50	12	17	29	−10	10
25	Viktor Kozlov‡	C	48	11	16	27	−4	16
13	Juraj Kolnik	RW	53	14	11	25	−7	14
14	Niklas Hagman	LW	75	10	13	23	−5	22
16	Nathan Horton	C	55	14	8	22	−5	57
4	Jay Bouwmeester	D	61	2	18	20	−15	30
17	Matt Cullen	C	56	6	13	19	−2	24
18	Marcus Nilson‡	LW	69	6	13	19	−9	26
2	Lyle Odelein	D	82	4	12	16	−7	88
7	Pavel Trnka	D	67	3	13	16	2	51
28	Donald Audette†	RW	28	6	7	13	−9	22
34	Mathieu Biron	D	57	3	10	13	−13	51
19	Byron Ritchie	C	50	5	6	11	−10	84
11	Mikael Samuelsson	RW	37	3	6	9	0	35
40 (Note: Nedorost wore number 62 in his first two games.)	Vaclav Nedorost	C	32	4	3	7	−6	12
6	Andreas Lilja	D	79	3	4	7	−8	90
23	Lukas Krajicek	D	18	1	6	7	−2	12
5	Branislav Mezei	D	45	0	7	7	−4	80
38	Eric Beaudoin	LW	30	2	4	6	−6	12
39	Ivan Novoseltsev‡	RW	17	1	4	5	−6	8
27	Christian Berglund†	LW	10	3	1	4	−2	10
24	Darcy Hordichuk	LW	57	3	1	4	−10	158
1	Roberto Luongo	G	72	0	3	3		2
20	Craig MacDonald‡	LW	34	0	3	3	−5	25
15 (Note: Messier suffered a dislocated right wrist in a November 21 game and missed the rest of the season. On the Panthers official website he is listed as having changed his number to 29 after the trade deadline.)	Eric Messier	LW	21	0	3	3	−2	16
27	Jaroslav Bednar‡	RW	13	1	1	2	2	4
20	Josh Olson	LW	5	1	0	1	1	0
20	Kamil Piros†	C	3	1	0	1	−1	0
23	Lee Goren	RW	2	0	1	1	−4	0
41	Mike Green‡	C	11	0	1	1	0	2
44	Gregory Campbell	LW	2	0	0	0	−1	5
15	Ty Jones†	RW	6	0	0	0	0	7
33	Kristian Kudroc	D	2	0	0	0	0	2
32	Grant McNeill	D	3	0	0	0	0	5
36	Kyle Rossiter‡	D	4	0	0	0	−1	7
31	Steve Shields	G	16	0	0	0		6
21	Denis Shvidki	RW	2	0	0	0	0	0

=== Goaltending ===
No.	Player	Regular season									
No.	Player	GP	W	L	T	SA	GA	GAA	SV%	SO	TOI
1	Roberto Luongo	72	25	33	14	2475	172	2.43	.931	7	4252
31	Steve Shields	16	3	6	1	346	42	3.44	.879	0	732

== Awards and records ==
=== Awards ===
Type	Award/honor	Recipient	Ref
League (annual)	NHL Second All-Star Team	Roberto Luongo (Goaltender)	
League (in-season)	NHL All-Star Game selection	Roberto Luongo	

=== Milestones ===
Milestone	Player	Date	Ref
First game	Nathan Horton	October 9, 2003	
First game	Gregory Campbell	October 18, 2003	
First game	Grant McNeill	November 22, 2003	
First game	Mike Green	February 3, 2004	
First game	Josh Olson	March 11, 2004	
1,000th game played	Lyle Odelein	January 31, 2004	

== Transactions ==
The Panthers were involved in the following transactions from June 10, 2003, the day after the deciding game of the 2003 Stanley Cup Finals, through June 7, 2004, the day of the deciding game of the 2004 Stanley Cup Finals.

=== Trades ===
Date	Details		Ref
June 21, 2003	To Pittsburgh Penguins: 1st-round pick in 2003; 3rd-round pick in 2003	To Florida Panthers: Mikael Samuelsson; 1st-round pick in 2003; 2nd-round pick in 2003	
June 21, 2003	To Tampa Bay Lightning: 2nd-round pick in 2003; 2nd-round pick in 2003; 6th-round pick in 2003	To Florida Panthers: 1st-round pick in 2003	
June 21, 2003	To Atlanta Thrashers: Ivan Majesky	To Florida Panthers: 2nd-round pick in 2003	
June 22, 2003	To Philadelphia Flyers: 6th-round pick in 2004	To Florida Panthers: 7th-round pick in 2003	
June 22, 2003	To Chicago Blackhawks: 9th-round pick in 2003	To Florida Panthers: Dmytro Tolkunov	
July 19, 2003	To Colorado Avalanche: Peter Worrell; 2nd-round pick in 2004	To Florida Panthers: Eric Messier; Vaclav Nedorost	
September 11, 2003	To Ottawa Senators: Serge Payer	To Florida Panthers: 9th-round pick in 2004	
October 5, 2003	To Boston Bruins: Future considerations	To Florida Panthers: Steve Shields	
December 29, 2003	To Ottawa Senators: Future considerations	To Florida Panthers: Wade Brookbank	
December 30, 2003	To Phoenix Coyotes: Ivan Novoseltsev	To Florida Panthers: Future considerations	
March 1, 2004	To New Jersey Devils: Viktor Kozlov	To Florida Panthers: Christian Berglund; Victor Uchevatov	
March 2, 2004	To Chicago Blackhawks: Future considerations	To Florida Panthers: Rights to Ty Jones	
March 8, 2004	To Calgary Flames: Marcus Nilsson	To Florida Panthers: 2nd-round pick in 2004	
March 8, 2004	To Dallas Stars: Valeri Bure	To Florida Panthers: Rights to Drew Bagnall; 2nd-round pick in 2004	
March 8, 2004	To Atlanta Thrashers: Kyle Rossiter	To Florida Panthers: Kamil Piros	
March 9, 2004	To New York Rangers: Jeff Paul	To Florida Panthers: Paul Healey	

=== Players acquired ===
Date	Player	Former team	Term	Via	Ref
June 25, 2003	Valeri Bure	St. Louis Blues		Waivers	
July 3, 2003	Kristian Kudroc	Tampa Bay Lightning	1-year	Free agency	
July 11, 2003	Max Birbraer	New Jersey Devils	1-year	Free agency	
July 24, 2003	Lee Goren	Boston Bruins	1-year	Free agency	
August 12, 2003	Travis Scott	Los Angeles Kings	2-year	Free agency	
August 14, 2003	Kent Huskins	Chicago Blackhawks	1-year	Free agency	
August 14, 2003	Craig MacDonald	Carolina Hurricanes	1-year	Free agency	
August 19, 2003	Jeff Paul	Colorado Avalanche	1-year	Free agency	
August 20, 2003	Todd Gill	Chicago Blackhawks	1-year	Free agency	
September 4, 2003	Jonas Hoglund	Toronto Maple Leafs	1-year	Free agency	
September 9, 2003	Lyle Odelein	Dallas Stars	1-year	Free agency	
October 3, 2003	Steve Valiquette	Edmonton Oilers		Waiver draft	
January 16, 2004	Donald Audette	Montreal Canadiens	1-year	Free agency	

=== Players lost ===
Date	Player	New team	Via (Note: In parentheses is the player's free agency group on July 1 if applicable.)	Ref
July 1, 2003	Igor Kravchuk (Note: Kravchuk retired.)		Contract expiration (III)	
July 1, 2003	Andy Lundbohm (Note: Lundbohm retired.)		Contract expiration (VI)	
July 4, 2003	Pierre Dagenais	Montreal Canadiens	Free agency (VI)	
July 14, 2003	Igor Ulanov	Toronto Roadrunners (AHL) (Note: Ulanov signed with the Roadrunners on December 13.)	Buyout	
July 15, 2003	Rocky Thompson	Edmonton Oilers	Free agency (VI)	
July 16, 2003	Pascal Trepanier	Tampa Bay Lightning (Note: Trepanier signed with Tampa Bay on July 23.)	Release (II)	
July 29, 2003	Stephane Matteau		Retirement (III)	
July 29, 2003	Jamie Rivers	Detroit Red Wings	Free agency (UFA)	
August 6, 2003	Tyrone Garner	Stuttgart Wizards (GER-3)	Free agency (UFA)	
September 8, 2003	Dmytro Tolkunov	Lokomotiv Yaroslavl (RSL)	Free agency (II) (Note: Florida retained Tolkunov’s NHL rights through the 2006–07 season.)	
September 20, 2003	Paul Laus		Retirement	
September 25, 2003	Petr Kadlec	HC Slavia Praha (ELH) (Note: Kadlec returned to Slavia.)	Release	
N/A	Jim Campbell	HC Neftekhimik Nizhnekamsk (RSL)	Free agency (UFA)	
October 3, 2003	Todd Gill	Lausitzer Fuchse (GER-3) (Note: Gill signed with Lausitzer on December 26.)	Release	
October 3, 2003	Jani Hurme	Carolina Hurricanes	Waiver draft	
October 3, 2003	Chris Mason	Nashville Predators	Waiver draft	
October 4, 2003	Jonas Hoglund	HC Davos (NLA) (Note: Hoglund signed with HC Davos on October 15.)	Release	
October 8, 2003	Steve Valiquette	Edmonton Oilers	Waivers	
November 11, 2003	Jeff Toms	EHC Basel (NLA)	Free agency	
December 1, 2003	Jaroslav Bednar	Avangard Omsk (RSL) (Note: Bednar signed with Avangard Omsk on December 11.)	Release	
January 20, 2004	Craig MacDonald	Boston Bruins	Waivers	
March 9, 2004	Mike Green	New York Rangers	Waivers	

=== Signings ===
Date	Player	Term	Contract type	Ref
June 11, 2003	Branislav Mezei	3-year	Re-signing	
June 13, 2003	Mathieu Biron	3-year	Re-signing	
July 3, 2003	Chris Mason	1-year	Re-signing	
July 15, 2003	Petr Kadlec	1-year	Entry-level	
July 16, 2003	Olli Jokinen	1-year	Re-signing	
July 16, 2003	Viktor Kozlov	1-year	Re-signing	
July 24, 2003	Darcy Hordichuk	1-year	Re-signing	
July 24, 2003	Denis Shvidki	1-year	Re-signing	
July 30, 2003	Jaroslav Bednar	1-year	Re-signing	
August 5, 2003	Eric Beaudoin	1-year	Re-signing	
August 5, 2003	Mike Green	1-year	Re-signing	
August 5, 2003	Kyle Rossiter	1-year	Re-signing	
August 12, 2003	Ryan Jardine	1-year	Re-signing	
August 12, 2003	Ivan Novoseltsev	1-year	Re-signing	
August 19, 2003	Mike Van Ryn	1-year	Re-signing	
September 3, 2003	Kristian Huselius	2-year	Re-signing	
September 3, 2003	Juraj Kolnik	1-year	Re-signing	
September 3, 2003	Michel Periard	1-year	Re-signing	
October 6, 2003	Nathan Horton	3-year	Entry-level	
October 14, 2003	Petr Taticek	3-year	Entry-level	
June 1, 2004	Rob Globke		Entry-level	
June 1, 2004	Jeremy Swanson		Entry-level	

== Draft picks ==
Florida's draft picks at the 2003 NHL entry draft held at the Gaylord Entertainment Center in Nashville, Tennessee.

Round	#	Player	Nationality	College/Junior/Club team (League)
1	3	Nathan Horton	Canada	Oshawa Generals (OHL)
1	25	Anthony Stewart	Canada	Kingston Frontenacs (OHL)
2	38	Kamil Kreps	Czech Republic	Brampton Battalion (OHL)
2	55	Stefan Meyer	Canada	Medicine Hat Tigers (WHL)
4	105	Martin Lojek	Czech Republic	Brampton Battalion (OHL)
4	124	James Pemberton	United States	Providence College (NCAA)
5	141	Dan Travis	United States	Deerfield Academy (USHS–MA)
5	162	Martin Tuma	Czech Republic	HC Litvínov Jr. (Czech Republic)
6	171	Denis Stasyuk	Russia	Metallurg Novokuznetsk (Russia)
7	223	Dany Roussin	Canada	Rimouski Océanic (QMJHL)
8	234	Petr Kadlec	Czech Republic	Slavia Prague (Czech Republic)
9	264	John Hecimovic	Canada	Sarnia Sting (OHL)
9	265	Tanner Glass	Canada	Dartmouth College (ECAC)
