= 2003–04 Ottawa Senators season =

NHL hockey team season

2003–04 Ottawa Senators
- Division: 3rd Northeast
- Conference: 5th Eastern
- 2003–04 record: 43–23–10–6
- Home record: 23–8–5–5
- Road record: 20–15–5–1
- Goals for: 262
- Goals against: 189

Team information
- General manager: John Muckler
- Coach: Jacques Martin
- Captain: Daniel Alfredsson
- Alternate captains: Zdeno Chara; Curtis Leschyshyn; Wade Redden
- Arena: Corel Centre
- Average attendance: 17,758
- Minor league affiliate: Binghamton Senators

Team leaders
- Goals: Marian Hossa (36)
- Assists: Daniel Alfredsson (48)
- Points: Marian Hossa (82)
- Penalty minutes: Chris Neil (194)
- Plus/minus: Zdeno Chara (+33)
- Wins: Patrick Lalime (25)
- Goals against average: Martin Prusek (2.12)

The 2003–04 Ottawa Senators season was the 12th season of the Ottawa Senators of the National Hockey League (NHL). This season would see the Senators again finish with over 100 points, finishing with 102, but this was good for only third in the tightly-contested division, as the Boston Bruins would have 104 and the Toronto Maple Leafs 103. Ottawa would meet Toronto in the first-round of the playoffs for the fourth time, where the Maple Leafs would win the series 4–3 to end the Senators' playoff hopes. Ottawa would fire head coach Jacques Martin after the playoff round.

== Offseason ==
On June 21, 2003, assistant coach Roger Neilson died after four years of battling cancer. The Senators would wear a patch on their jerseys with an illustration of his signature and a necktie. Neilson would often wear distinctive neckties and the necktie became associated with him, and also became the symbol for "Roger's House", a residence for the use of families with a family member fighting cancer while in hospital, established by him and the Senators.

On August 26, 2003, Eugene Melnyk purchased the club to bring financial stability.

== Regular season ==
Marian Hossa lead the club in scoring with 82 points, good enough for sixth overall in the NHL.

=== Highlights ===
On February 5, 2004, the Senators were playing the Toronto Maple Leafs and were leading 4–0 in the second period. The flu started affecting players on the Senators leading the team to be down to only 15 skaters by the end of the game. The Maple Leafs took full advantage and won the game 5–4 in overtime.

On March 5, 2004, in a game against the Philadelphia Flyers, a record was set for the most penalty minutes in a game by both teams, at 419 minutes. Five brawls broke out in the last two minutes of the game. It took the officials until 90 minutes after the game was over to sort out the penalties. By the end of the game, Philadelphia had 213 penalty minutes and seven men left on the bench, while Ottawa finished with 206 penalty minutes and six men left.

The Senators finished the regular season first overall in the NHL in scoring (262 goals for), power-play goals scored (80) and power-play percentage (21.62%).

=== Final standings ===
Northeast Division
| No. | CR | | GP | W | L | T | OTL | GF | GA | Pts |
|---|---|---|---|---|---|---|---|---|---|---|
| 1 | 2 | **Boston Bruins** | 82 | 41 | 19 | 15 | 7 | 209 | 188 | 104 |
| 2 | 4 | **Toronto Maple Leafs** | 82 | 45 | 24 | 10 | 3 | 242 | 204 | 103 |
| 3 | 5 | **Ottawa Senators** | 82 | 43 | 23 | 10 | 6 | 262 | 189 | 102 |
| 4 | 7 | **Montreal Canadiens** | 82 | 41 | 30 | 7 | 4 | 208 | 192 | 93 |
| 5 | 9 | Buffalo Sabres | 82 | 37 | 34 | 7 | 4 | 220 | 221 | 85 |

Note: CR = Conference rank; GP = Games played; W = Wins; L = Losses; T = Ties; OTL = Overtime loss; GF = Goals for; GA = Goals against; Pts = Points
Bolded teams qualified for the playoffs.

Eastern Conference
| R | | Div | GP | W | L | T | OTL | GF | GA | Pts |
|---|---|---|---|---|---|---|---|---|---|---|
| **1** | **Z-** Tampa Bay Lightning | **SE** | **82** | **46** | **22** | **8** | **6** | **245** | **192** | 106 |
| **2** | **Y-** Boston Bruins | **NE** | **82** | **41** | **19** | **15** | **7** | **209** | **188** | 104 |
| **3** | **Y-** Philadelphia Flyers | **AT** | **82** | **40** | **21** | **15** | **6** | **209** | **188** | 101 |
| **4** | **X-** Toronto Maple Leafs | **NE** | **82** | **45** | **24** | **10** | **3** | **242** | **204** | 103 |
| **5** | **X-** Ottawa Senators | **NE** | **82** | **43** | **23** | **10** | **6** | **262** | **189** | 102 |
| **6** | **X-** New Jersey Devils | **AT** | **82** | **43** | **25** | **12** | **2** | **213** | **164** | 100 |
| **7** | **X-** Montreal Canadiens | **NE** | **82** | **41** | **30** | **7** | **4** | **208** | **192** | 93 |
| **8** | **X-** New York Islanders | **AT** | **82** | **38** | **29** | **11** | **4** | **237** | **210** | 91 |
8.5
| 9 | Buffalo Sabres | NE | 82 | 37 | 34 | 7 | 4 | 220 | 221 | 85 |
| 10 | Atlanta Thrashers | SE | 82 | 33 | 37 | 8 | 4 | 214 | 243 | 78 |
| 11 | Carolina Hurricanes | SE | 82 | 28 | 34 | 14 | 6 | 172 | 209 | 76 |
| 12 | Florida Panthers | SE | 82 | 28 | 35 | 15 | 4 | 188 | 221 | 75 |
| 13 | New York Rangers | AT | 82 | 27 | 40 | 7 | 8 | 206 | 250 | 69 |
| 14 | Washington Capitals | SE | 82 | 23 | 46 | 10 | 3 | 186 | 253 | 59 |
| 15 | Pittsburgh Penguins | AT | 82 | 23 | 47 | 8 | 4 | 190 | 303 | 58 |

Divisions: AT – Atlantic, NE – Northeast, SE – Southeast

Z – Clinched conference; Y – Clinched division; X – Clinched playoff spot

== Playoffs ==
In the first round of the 2004 playoffs, the Senators would lose again to the Maple Leafs for the fourth straight time. By now, Ottawa had developed a strong rivalry with their Ontario cousins and there was a great deal of pressure on the team to finally defeat the Leafs. Two days after the Senators' loss, head coach Jacques Martin was fired, and goaltender Patrick Lalime was later traded to the St. Louis Blues.

Martin had been coach of the Senators for eight-and-a-half years. He was well respected, earned a 341–255–96 regular season record with the Senators, had led the team to eight consecutive playoff appearances and was widely credited with changing the team into an elite NHL franchise. He also won the Jack Adams Trophy as coach of the year in 1999. However, after losing eight of 12 playoff series, including all four series in five years against the rival Toronto Maple Leafs, Senators ownership felt that a new coach was required for playoff success.

== Schedule and results ==
=== Regular season ===
2003–04 regular season
October: 5–2–0–1 (home: 2–1–0–1; road: 3–1–0–0)

| Game | Date | Score | Opponent | Record | Attendance | Recap |
|---|---|---|---|---|---|---|
| 1 | October 9, 2003 | 5–2 | Montreal Canadiens (2003–04) | 1–0–0–0 | 18,500 | W |
| 2 | October 11, 2003 | 2–3 OT | Detroit Red Wings (2003–04) | 1–0–0–1 | 18,500 | OTL |
| 3 | October 15, 2003 | 3–4 | @ Los Angeles Kings (2003–04) | 1–1–0–1 | 18,180 | L |
| 4 | October 17, 2003 | 3–0 | @ Mighty Ducks of Anaheim (2003–04) | 2–1–0–1 | 13,885 | W |
| 5 | October 18, 2003 | 4–1 | @ San Jose Sharks (2003–04) | 3–1–0–1 | 14,807 | W |
| 6 | October 23, 2003 | 5–1 | Washington Capitals (2003–04) | 4–1–0–1 | 18,188 | W |
| 7 | October 25, 2003 | 6–2 | @ Montreal Canadiens (2003–04) | 5–1–0–1 | 21,273 | W |
| 8 | October 30, 2003 | 2–3 | Florida Panthers (2003–04) | 5–2–0–1 | 17,086 | L |

November: 4–6–2–2 (home: 2–4–2–1; road: 2–2–0–1)

| Game | Date | Score | Opponent | Record | Attendance | Recap |
|---|---|---|---|---|---|---|
| 9 | November 1, 2003 | 1–1 OT | Buffalo Sabres (2003–04) | 5–2–1–1 | 15,445 | T |
| 10 | November 3, 2003 | 3–6 | @ New York Islanders (2003–04) | 5–3–1–1 | 10,957 | L |
| 11 | November 6, 2003 | 3–3 OT | Edmonton Oilers (2003–04) | 5–3–2–1 | 15,216 | T |
| 12 | November 8, 2003 | 0–1 | New Jersey Devils (2003–04) | 5–4–2–1 | 18,359 | L |
| 13 | November 11, 2003 | 5–3 | @ Atlanta Thrashers (2003–04) | 6–4–2–1 | 13,547 | W |
| 14 | November 13, 2003 | 5–2 | Columbus Blue Jackets (2003–04) | 7–4–2–1 | 15,297 | W |
| 15 | November 15, 2003 | 2–3 | Montreal Canadiens (2003–04) | 7–5–2–1 | 18,337 | L |
| 16 | November 17, 2003 | 1–2 | Buffalo Sabres (2003–04) | 7–6–2–1 | 15,744 | L |
| 17 | November 20, 2003 | 6–1 | Carolina Hurricanes (2003–04) | 8–6–2–1 | 17,159 | W |
| 18 | November 22, 2003 | 1–2 OT | @ Pittsburgh Penguins (2003–04) | 8–6–2–2 | 11,233 | OTL |
| 19 | November 23, 2003 | 2–6 | @ New York Rangers (2003–04) | 8–7–2–2 | 18,200 | L |
| 20 | November 25, 2003 | 6–3 | @ Atlanta Thrashers (2003–04) | 9–7–2–2 | 11,937 | W |
| 21 | November 27, 2003 | 2–3 OT | Vancouver Canucks (2003–04) | 9–7–2–3 | 18,500 | OTL |
| 22 | November 29, 2003 | 1–2 | Toronto Maple Leafs (2003–04) | 9–8–2–3 | 18,500 | L |

December: 9–2–3–0 (home: 6–2–1–0; road: 3–0–2–0)

| Game | Date | Score | Opponent | Record | Attendance | Recap |
|---|---|---|---|---|---|---|
| 23 | December 1, 2003 | 4–1 | Philadelphia Flyers (2003–04) | 10–8–2–3 | 16,289 | W |
| 24 | December 3, 2003 | 4–0 | @ Florida Panthers (2003–04) | 11–8–2–3 | 11,520 | W |
| 25 | December 4, 2003 | 4–1 | @ Tampa Bay Lightning (2003–04) | 12–8–2–3 | 15,221 | W |
| 26 | December 6, 2003 | 1–2 | New Jersey Devils (2003–04) | 12–9–2–3 | 17,931 | L |
| 27 | December 8, 2003 | 2–2 OT | @ Boston Bruins (2003–04) | 12–9–3–3 | 10,662 | T |
| 28 | December 11, 2003 | 3–2 | Tampa Bay Lightning (2003–04) | 13–9–3–3 | 17,256 | W |
| 29 | December 13, 2003 | 2–3 | Boston Bruins (2003–04) | 13–10–3–3 | 17,671 | L |
| 30 | December 18, 2003 | 6–1 | Chicago Blackhawks (2003–04) | 14–10–3–3 | 16,420 | W |
| 31 | December 20, 2003 | 3–1 | New York Rangers (2003–04) | 15–10–3–3 | 18,037 | W |
| 32 | December 22, 2003 | 3–2 OT | Florida Panthers (2003–04) | 16–10–3–3 | 17,189 | W |
| 33 | December 23, 2003 | 2–2 OT | @ Buffalo Sabres (2003–04) | 16–10–4–3 | 15,317 | T |
| 34 | December 26, 2003 | 3–3 OT | Pittsburgh Penguins (2003–04) | 16–10–5–3 | 18,316 | T |
| 35 | December 28, 2003 | 5–2 | Atlanta Thrashers (2003–04) | 17–10–5–3 | 18,500 | W |
| 36 | December 30, 2003 | 3–0 | @ Boston Bruins (2003–04) | 18–10–5–3 | 16,388 | W |

January: 10–4–2–0 (home: 6–0–1–0; road: 4–4–1–0)

| Game | Date | Score | Opponent | Record | Attendance | Recap |
|---|---|---|---|---|---|---|
| 37 | January 1, 2004 | 1–0 | New York Islanders (2003–04) | 19–10–5–3 | 18,500 | W |
| 38 | January 3, 2004 | 5–2 | Washington Capitals (2003–04) | 20–10–5–3 | 17,695 | W |
| 39 | January 6, 2004 | 5–2 | Tampa Bay Lightning (2003–04) | 21–10–5–3 | 16,890 | W |
| 40 | January 8, 2004 | 7–1 | @ Toronto Maple Leafs (2003–04) | 22–10–5–3 | 19,395 | W |
| 41 | January 9, 2004 | 2–3 | @ Buffalo Sabres (2003–04) | 22–11–5–3 | 18,690 | L |
| 42 | January 11, 2004 | 2–2 OT | @ Carolina Hurricanes (2003–04) | 22–11–6–3 | 9,350 | T |
| 43 | January 13, 2004 | 4–0 | @ New Jersey Devils (2003–04) | 23–11–6–3 | 11,456 | W |
| 44 | January 15, 2004 | 4–4 OT | New York Islanders (2003–04) | 23–11–7–3 | 17,197 | T |
| 45 | January 17, 2004 | 4–0 | Boston Bruins (2003–04) | 24–11–7–3 | 18,500 | W |
| 46 | January 19, 2004 | 2–5 | @ New York Islanders (2003–04) | 24–12–7–3 | 14,213 | L |
| 47 | January 20, 2004 | 3–1 | @ Carolina Hurricanes (2003–04) | 25–12–7–3 | 8,810 | W |
| 48 | January 22, 2004 | 6–5 | Pittsburgh Penguins (2003–04) | 26–12–7–3 | 16,777 | W |
| 49 | January 24, 2004 | 9–1 | New York Rangers (2003–04) | 27–12–7–3 | 18,500 | W |
| 50 | January 28, 2004 | 3–5 | @ Dallas Stars (2003–04) | 27–13–7–3 | 18,006 | L |
| 51 | January 29, 2004 | 4–1 | @ Phoenix Coyotes (2003–04) | 28–13–7–3 | 13,387 | W |
| 52 | January 31, 2004 | 1–5 | @ Toronto Maple Leafs (2003–04) | 28–14–7–3 | 19,419 | L |

February: 7–2–2–2 (home: 5–0–1–2; road: 2–2–1–0)

| Game | Date | Score | Opponent | Record | Attendance | Recap |
|---|---|---|---|---|---|---|
| 53 | February 3, 2004 | 1–2 | @ New Jersey Devils (2003–04) | 28–15–7–3 | 12,304 | L |
| 54 | February 5, 2004 | 4–5 OT | Toronto Maple Leafs (2003–04) | 28–15–7–4 | 18,500 | OTL |
| 55 | February 10, 2004 | 3–1 | St. Louis Blues (2003–04) | 29–15–7–4 | 18,238 | W |
| 56 | February 12, 2004 | 3–2 OT | Boston Bruins (2003–04) | 30–15–7–4 | 18,364 | W |
| 57 | February 14, 2004 | 5–2 | Montreal Canadiens (2003–04) | 31–15–7–4 | 18,500 | W |
| 58 | February 16, 2004 | 4–1 | @ New York Rangers (2003–04) | 32–15–7–4 | 18,200 | W |
| 59 | February 17, 2004 | 1–1 OT | @ Washington Capitals (2003–04) | 32–15–8–4 | 13,901 | T |
| 60 | February 19, 2004 | 2–3 OT | Atlanta Thrashers (2003–04) | 32–15–8–5 | 18,500 | OTL |
| 61 | February 21, 2004 | 2–1 | Calgary Flames (2003–04) | 33–15–8–5 | 18,500 | W |
| 62 | February 22, 2004 | 6–3 | @ Pittsburgh Penguins (2003–04) | 34–15–8–5 | 11,780 | W |
| 63 | February 24, 2004 | 2–4 | @ Montreal Canadiens (2003–04) | 34–16–8–5 | 21,273 | L |
| 64 | February 26, 2004 | 1–1 OT | Philadelphia Flyers (2003–04) | 34–16–9–5 | 18,500 | T |
| 65 | February 28, 2004 | 7–1 | Buffalo Sabres (2003–04) | 35–16–9–5 | 18,500 | W |

March: 7–6–1–1 (home: 2–0–0–1; road: 5–6–1–0)

| Game | Date | Score | Opponent | Record | Attendance | Recap |
|---|---|---|---|---|---|---|
| 66 | March 3, 2004 | 3–4 | @ Buffalo Sabres (2003–04) | 35–17–9–5 | 11,956 | L |
| 67 | March 5, 2004 | 3–5 | @ Philadelphia Flyers (2003–04) | 35–18–9–5 | 19,539 | L |
| 68 | March 6, 2004 | 4–2 | Nashville Predators (2003–04) | 36–18–9–5 | 18,500 | W |
| 69 | March 8, 2004 | 4–1 | @ Washington Capitals (2003–04) | 37–18–9–5 | 17,776 | W |
| 70 | March 11, 2004 | 2–4 | @ Calgary Flames (2003–04) | 37–19–9–5 | 17,869 | L |
| 71 | March 13, 2004 | 2–1 | @ Vancouver Canucks (2003–04) | 38–19–9–5 | 18,630 | W |
| 72 | March 14, 2004 | 1–3 | @ Edmonton Oilers (2003–04) | 38–20–9–5 | 16,839 | L |
| 73 | March 16, 2004 | 2–5 | @ Minnesota Wild (2003–04) | 38–21–9–5 | 18,568 | L |
| 74 | March 18, 2004 | 2–0 | Colorado Avalanche (2003–04) | 39–21–9–5 | 18,500 | W |
| 75 | March 20, 2004 | 2–3 OT | Carolina Hurricanes (2003–04) | 39–21–9–6 | 18,500 | OTL |
| 76 | March 23, 2004 | 2–4 | @ Boston Bruins (2003–04) | 39–22–9–6 | 15,887 | L |
| 77 | March 25, 2004 | 4–0 | @ Montreal Canadiens (2003–04) | 40–22–9–6 | 21,273 | W |
| 78 | March 27, 2004 | 2–2 OT | @ Toronto Maple Leafs (2003–04) | 40–22–10–6 | 19,480 | T |
| 79 | March 29, 2004 | 5–4 OT | @ Tampa Bay Lightning (2003–04) | 41–22–10–6 | 19,844 | W |
| 80 | March 31, 2004 | 5–4 | @ Florida Panthers (2003–04) | 42–22–10–6 | 15,876 | W |

April: 1–1–0–0 (home: 0–1–0–0; road: 1–0–0–0)

| Game | Date | Score | Opponent | Record | Attendance | Recap |
|---|---|---|---|---|---|---|
| 81 | April 2, 2004 | 3–1 | @ Philadelphia Flyers (2003–04) | 43–22–10–6 | 19,776 | W |
| 82 | April 3, 2004 | 0–6 | Toronto Maple Leafs (2003–04) | 43–23–10–6 | 18,500 | L |

Legend: W Win (2 points) L Loss (0 points) T Tie (1 point) OTL Overtime loss (1 point)

=== Playoffs ===
2004 Stanley Cup playoffs
Eastern Conference Quarterfinals vs. (4) Toronto Maple Leafs – Maple Leafs win 4–3

| Game | Date | Visitor | Score | Home | OT | Attendance | Series | Recap |
|---|---|---|---|---|---|---|---|---|
| 1 | April 8 | Ottawa | 4–2 | Toronto | | 19,535 | Senators lead 1–0 | W |
| 2 | April 10 | Ottawa | 0–2 | Toronto | | 19,529 | Series tied 1–1 | L |
| 3 | April 12 | Toronto | 2–0 | Ottawa | | 18,500 | Maple Leafs lead 2–1 | L |
| 4 | April 14 | Toronto | 1–4 | Ottawa | | 18,500 | Series tied 2–2 | W |
| 5 | April 16 | Ottawa | 0–2 | Toronto | | 19,584 | Maple Leafs lead 3–2 | L |
| 6 | April 18 | Toronto | 1–2 | Ottawa | 2OT | 18,500 | Series tied 3–3 | W |
| 7 | April 20 | Ottawa | 1–4 | Toronto | | 19,646 | Maple Leafs win 4–3 | L |

Legend: W Win L Loss

== Player statistics ==
=== Scoring ===
- Position abbreviations: C = Centre; D = Defence; G = Goaltender; LW = Left wing; RW = Right wing
- † = Joined team via a transaction (e.g., trade, waivers, signing) during the season. Stats reflect time with the Senators only.
- ‡ = Left team via a transaction (e.g., trade, waivers, release) during the season. Stats reflect time with the Senators only.

| No. | Player | Pos | Regular season | | | | | | Playoffs | | | | | |
| No. | Player | Pos | GP | G | A | Pts | +/- | PIM | GP | G | A | Pts | +/- | PIM |
|---|---|---|---|---|---|---|---|---|---|---|---|---|---|---|
| 18 | Marian Hossa | RW | 81 | 36 | 46 | 82 | 4 | 46 | 7 | 3 | 1 | 4 | 2 | 0 |
| 11 | Daniel Alfredsson | RW | 77 | 32 | 48 | 80 | 12 | 24 | 7 | 1 | 2 | 3 | 0 | 2 |
| 9 | Martin Havlat | RW | 68 | 31 | 37 | 68 | 12 | 46 | 7 | 0 | 3 | 3 | −1 | 2 |
| 39 | Jason Spezza | C | 78 | 22 | 33 | 55 | 22 | 71 | 3 | 0 | 0 | 0 | −1 | 2 |
| 21 | Bryan Smolinski | C | 80 | 19 | 27 | 46 | 22 | 49 | 7 | 1 | 1 | 2 | −2 | 4 |
| 14 | Radek Bonk | C | 66 | 12 | 32 | 44 | 2 | 66 | 7 | 0 | 2 | 2 | 2 | 0 |
| 6 | Wade Redden | D | 81 | 17 | 26 | 43 | 21 | 65 | 7 | 1 | 0 | 1 | −5 | 2 |
| 3 | Zdeno Chara | D | 79 | 16 | 25 | 41 | 33 | 147 | 7 | 1 | 1 | 2 | 3 | 8 |
| 15 | Peter Schaefer | LW | 81 | 15 | 24 | 39 | 22 | 26 | 7 | 0 | 2 | 2 | 1 | 4 |
| 28 | Todd White | C | 53 | 9 | 20 | 29 | 12 | 22 | 7 | 1 | 0 | 1 | −1 | 4 |
| 4 | Chris Phillips | D | 82 | 7 | 16 | 23 | 15 | 46 | 7 | 1 | 0 | 1 | 2 | 12 |
| 33 | Josh Langfeld | RW | 38 | 7 | 10 | 17 | 6 | 16 | — | — | — | — | — | — |
| 23 | Karel Rachunek‡ | D | 60 | 1 | 16 | 17 | 17 | 29 | — | — | — | — | — | — |
| 25 | Chris Neil | RW | 82 | 8 | 8 | 16 | 13 | 194 | 7 | 0 | 1 | 1 | 0 | 19 |
| 20 | Antoine Vermette | C | 57 | 7 | 7 | 14 | 5 | 16 | 4 | 0 | 1 | 1 | −1 | 4 |
| 10 | Peter Bondra† | RW | 23 | 5 | 9 | 14 | 1 | 16 | 7 | 0 | 0 | 0 | −4 | 6 |
| 22 | Shaun Van Allen | C | 73 | 2 | 10 | 12 | 6 | 80 | — | — | — | — | — | — |
| 26 | Vaclav Varada | RW | 30 | 5 | 5 | 10 | 2 | 26 | 7 | 1 | 1 | 2 | 0 | 4 |
| 12 | Mike Fisher | C | 24 | 4 | 6 | 10 | −3 | 39 | 7 | 1 | 0 | 1 | 0 | 4 |
| 2 | Brian Pothier | D | 55 | 2 | 6 | 8 | 6 | 24 | 7 | 0 | 0 | 0 | −2 | 6 |
| 19 | Petr Schastlivy‡ | LW | 43 | 2 | 4 | 6 | −1 | 14 | — | — | — | — | — | — |
| 7 | Curtis Leschyshyn | D | 56 | 1 | 4 | 5 | 13 | 16 | 2 | 0 | 0 | 0 | −1 | 0 |
| 34 | Shane Hnidy‡ | D | 37 | 0 | 5 | 5 | 2 | 72 | — | — | — | — | — | — |
| 24 | Anton Volchenkov | D | 19 | 1 | 2 | 3 | 1 | 8 | 5 | 0 | 0 | 0 | 0 | 6 |
| 40 | Patrick Lalime | G | 57 | 0 | 2 | 2 | | 17 | 7 | 0 | 0 | 0 | | 2 |
| 32 | Rob Ray | RW | 6 | 1 | 0 | 1 | 0 | 14 | — | — | — | — | — | — |
| 5 | Greg de Vries† | D | 13 | 0 | 1 | 1 | 0 | 6 | 7 | 0 | 1 | 1 | −2 | 8 |
| 43 | Serge Payer | C | 5 | 0 | 1 | 1 | 1 | 2 | — | — | — | — | — | — |
| 31 | Martin Prusek | G | 29 | 0 | 1 | 1 | | 0 | 1 | 0 | 0 | 0 | | 0 |
| 27 | Todd Simpson† | D | 16 | 0 | 1 | 1 | −1 | 47 | — | — | — | — | — | — |
| 1 | Ray Emery | G | 3 | 0 | 0 | 0 | | 2 | — | — | — | — | — | — |
| 45 | Denis Hamel | LW | 5 | 0 | 0 | 0 | −3 | 0 | — | — | — | — | — | — |
| 16 | Jody Hull | RW | 1 | 0 | 0 | 0 | 0 | 0 | — | — | — | — | — | — |
| 49 | Chris Kelly | C | 4 | 0 | 0 | 0 | −2 | 0 | — | — | — | — | — | — |
| 29 | Brooks Laich‡ | C | 1 | 0 | 0 | 0 | 0 | 2 | — | — | — | — | — | — |
| 42 | Julien Vauclair | D | 1 | 0 | 0 | 0 | 1 | 2 | — | — | — | — | — | — |

=== Goaltending ===
| No. | Player | Regular season | | | | | | | | | | Playoffs | | | | | | | | |
| No. | Player | GP | W | L | T | SA | GA | GAA | SV% | SO | TOI | GP | W | L | SA | GA | GAA | SV% | SO | TOI |
|---|---|---|---|---|---|---|---|---|---|---|---|---|---|---|---|---|---|---|---|---|
| 40 | Patrick Lalime | 57 | 25 | 23 | 7 | 1334 | 127 | 2.29 | .905 | 5 | 3324 | 7 | 3 | 4 | 139 | 13 | 1.96 | .906 | 0 | 398 |
| 31 | Martin Prusek | 29 | 16 | 6 | 3 | 651 | 54 | 2.12 | .917 | 3 | 1528 | 1 | 0 | 0 | 15 | 1 | 1.50 | .933 | 0 | 40 |
| 1 | Ray Emery | 3 | 2 | 0 | 0 | 52 | 5 | 2.38 | .904 | 0 | 126 | — | — | — | — | — | — | — | — | — |

== Awards and records ==
=== Awards ===
| Type | Award/honor | Recipient | Ref |
|---|---|---|---|
| League (annual) | NHL First All-Star Team | Zdeno Chara (Defence) | |
| League (in-season) | NHL All-Star Game selection | Daniel Alfredsson | |
| League (in-season) | NHL All-Star Game selection | Marian Hossa (Note: Hossa and Redden both missed the game due to injury. They were replaced by Glen Murray of the Boston Bruins and Pavel Kubina of the Tampa Bay Lightning, respectively.) | |
| League (in-season) | NHL All-Star Game selection | Wade Redden | |
| League (in-season) | NHL Defensive Player of the Month | Wade Redden (January) | |
| League (in-season) | NHL Offensive Player of the Week | Martin Havlat (January 19) | |
| Team | Molson Cup | Daniel Alfredsson | |

=== Milestones ===
| Milestone | Player | Date | Ref |
|---|---|---|---|
| First game | Antoine Vermette | October 9, 2003 | |
| First game | Julien Vauclair | October 25, 2003 | |
| First game | Brooks Laich | February 3, 2004 | |
| First game | Chris Kelly | February 5, 2004 | |

== Transactions ==
The Senators were involved in the following transactions from June 10, 2003, the day after the deciding game of the 2003 Stanley Cup Finals, through June 7, 2004, the day of the deciding game of the 2004 Stanley Cup Finals.

=== Trades ===
| Date | Details | | Ref |
|---|---|---|---|
| June 22, 2003 | To Washington Capitals: Washington’s 9th-round pick in 2003 | To Ottawa Senators: Future considerations (Note: Washington’s 9th-round pick in 2004) | |
| June 26, 2003 | To Minnesota Wild: Chris Bala | To Ottawa Senators: Peter Smrek | |
| September 10, 2003 | To Florida Panthers: 9th-round pick in 2004 | To Ottawa Senators: Serge Payer | |
| October 5, 2003 | To Washington Capitals: Future considerations | To Ottawa Senators: Denis Hamel | |
| December 29, 2003 | To Florida Panthers: Wade Brookbank | To Ottawa Senators: Future considerations | |
| January 6, 2004 | To Atlanta Thrashers: Daniel Corso | To Ottawa Senators: Brad Tapper | |
| January 23, 2004 | To Colorado Avalanche: Dennis Bonvie | To Ottawa Senators: Charlie Stephens | |
| February 4, 2004 | To Anaheim Mighty Ducks: Petr Schastlivy | To Ottawa Senators: Todd Simpson | |
| February 18, 2004 | To Washington Capitals: Brooks Laich; 2nd-round pick in 2005 | To Ottawa Senators: Peter Bondra | |
| March 9, 2004 | To Nashville Predators: Shane Hnidy | To Ottawa Senators: Colorado’s 3rd-round pick in 2004 | |
| March 9, 2004 | To New York Rangers: Alexandre Giroux; Karel Rachunek | To Ottawa Senators: Greg de Vries | |

=== Players acquired ===
| Date | Player | Former team | Term | Via | Ref |
|---|---|---|---|---|---|
| July 5, 2003 | Denis Hamel | Buffalo Sabres | multi-year | Free agency | |
| September 2, 2003 | Andrew Allen | Binghamton Senators (AHL) | 1-year | Free agency | |
| September 2, 2003 | Daniel Corso | St. Louis Blues | 1-year | Free agency | |
| October 3, 2003 | Glen Metropolit | Washington Capitals | | Waiver draft | |
| December 18, 2003 | Andy Hedlund | Binghamton Senators (AHL) | 2-year | Free agency | |
| December 19, 2003 | Wade Brookbank | Vancouver Canucks | | Waivers | |
| April 30, 2004 | Danny Bois | London Knights (OHL) | multi-year | Free agency | |
| May 11, 2004 | Kelly Guard | Kelowna Rockets (WHL) | multi-year | Free agency | |

=== Players lost ===
| Date | Player | New team | Via (Note: In parentheses is the player's free agency group on July 1 if applicable.) | Ref |
|---|---|---|---|---|
| July 2, 2003 | Joey Tetarenko | Carolina Hurricanes | Free agency (VI) | |
| July 7, 2003 | Mathieu Chouinard | Los Angeles Kings | Free agency (UFA) | |
| July 22, 2003 | Bob Wren | Augsburger Panther (DEL) | Free agency (VI) | |
| July 24, 2003 | Joe Murphy | Lukko (Liiga) | Free agency (II) (Note: Ottawa retained Murphy’s NHL rights through the 2005–06 season.) | |
| September 10, 2003 | Magnus Arvedson | Vancouver Canucks | Free agency (III) | |
| September 15, 2003 | Toni Dahlman | Ilves (Liiga) | Free agency (UFA) | |
| October 1, 2003 | Brad Smyth | Oulun Karpat (Liiga) | Free agency (V) | |
| October 3, 2003 | Wade Brookbank | Nashville Predators | Waiver draft | |
| October 3, 2003 | Denis Hamel | Washington Capitals | Waiver draft | |
| October 2003 | David Hymovitz | Binghamton Senators (AHL) | Free agency (VI) | |
| October 10, 2003 | Jeff Ulmer | Cardiff Devils (EIHL) | Free agency (VI) | |
| November 21, 2003 | Dean Melanson | Iserlohn Roosters (DEL) | Free agency (VI) | |
| May 12, 2004 | Julien Vauclair | HC Lugano (NLA) | Free agency (Note: Ottawa retained Vauclair’s NHL rights through the 2007–08 season.) | |

=== Signings ===
| Date | Player | Term | Contract type | Ref |
|---|---|---|---|---|
| June 11, 2003 | Shane Hnidy | 1-year | Re-signing | |
| June 21, 2003 | Bryan Smolinski | 4-year | Re-signing | |
| June 26, 2003 | Brian Pothier | 1-year | Option exercised | |
| July 3, 2003 | Jody Hull | 1-year | Re-signing | |
| July 15, 2003 | Martin Prusek | 1-year | Re-signing | |
| July 16, 2003 | Wade Redden | multi-year | Re-signing | |
| July 24, 2003 | Wade Brookbank | multi-year | Re-signing | |
| July 24, 2003 | Josh Langfeld | multi-year | Re-signing | |
| August 28, 2003 | Dennis Bonvie | 2-year | Re-signing | |
| September 10, 2003 | Serge Payer | 1-year | Re-signing | |
| October 11, 2003 | Martin Havlat | 1-year | Re-signing | |
| February 13, 2004 | Rob Ray | 1-year | Re-signing | |
| April 1, 2004 | Neil Komadoski | multi-year | Entry-level | |
| April 6, 2004 | Grant Potulny | 1-year | Entry-level | |

== Draft picks ==
Ottawa's draft picks from the 2003 NHL entry draft held on June 21 and June 22, 2003 at the Gaylord Entertainment Center in Nashville, Tennessee.

| Round | # | Player | Nationality | College/junior/club team (League) |
|---|---|---|---|---|
| 1 | 29 | Patrick Eaves | United States | Boston College (Hockey East) |
| 2 | 67 | Igor Mirnov | Russia | Dynamo Moscow (RSL) |
| 3 | 100 | Philippe Seydoux | Switzerland | Kloten Flyers (NLA) |
| 4 | 135 | Matt Karlsson | Sweden | Brynäs IF (Elitserien) |
| 5 | 142 | Tim Cook | United States | River City Lancers (USHL) |
| 5 | 166 | Sergei Gimayev | Russia | Severstal Cherepovets (RSL) |
| 7 | 228 | Will Colbert | Canada | Ottawa 67's (OHL) |
| 8 | 269 | Ossi Louhivaara | Finland | KooKoo (Mestis) |
| 9 | 291 | Brian Elliott | Canada | University of Wisconsin–Madison (WCHA) |

== Farm teams ==
=== Binghamton Senators ===
John Paddock returned as head coach of the Binghamton Senators for the 2003–04 season.

The Senators finished the season with a 34–34–9–3 record, earning 80 points and a fourth place finish in the East Division, earning a spot in the qualification round for the post-season. Binghamton lost to the Norfolk Admirals in the qualification round.

Denis Hamel led the club with 29 goals and 67 points. Brian McGrattan finished second in the league with 327 penalty minutes. Ray Emery led Binghamton with 21 victories as well as having a 2.47 GAA and a .922 save percentage.

== See also ==
- 2003–04 NHL season
