= 2003–04 Toronto Maple Leafs season =

NHL hockey team season

2003–04 Toronto Maple Leafs
- Division: 2nd Northeast
- Conference: 4th Eastern
- 2003–04 record: 45–24–10–3
- Home record: 22–14–3–2
- Road record: 23–10–7–1
- Goals for: 242
- Goals against: 204

Team information
- General manager: John Ferguson, Jr.
- Coach: Pat Quinn
- Captain: Mats Sundin
- Alternate captains: Bryan McCabe; Gary Roberts
- Arena: Air Canada Centre
- Average attendance: 19,376
- Minor league affiliates: St. John's Maple Leafs; Memphis RiverKings

Team leaders
- Goals: Mats Sundin (31)
- Assists: Mats Sundin (44)
- Points: Mats Sundin (75)
- Penalty minutes: Tie Domi (208)
- Plus/minus: Bryan McCabe (+22)
- Wins: Ed Belfour (34)
- Goals against average: Ed Belfour (2.13)

The 2003–04 Toronto Maple Leafs season, the club's 87th season of existence and 77th as the Maple Leafs, saw the team finish in second place in the Northeast Division with a record of 45 wins, 24 losses, 10 ties and three overtime losses for 103 points. It was the highest point total in franchise history, beating out the 100 points earned by the 1999–2000 team. The team qualified for the playoffs for the sixth year in a row, where they defeated their provincial rivals, the Ottawa Senators, in seven games in the Conference Quarterfinals before falling to the Philadelphia Flyers four games to two in the Conference Semifinals. The Leafs did not qualify for the playoffs again until the 2012–13 season (and did not qualify for the playoffs again in a full season until the 2016-17 season), and would not win another playoff series until the 2022–23 season. As of 2026, this season is the last where the franchise won a Game 7 in a playoff series.

== Offseason ==
On June 27, 2003, it was announced Pat Quinn would relinquish his dual roles as the team’s general manager and head coach and solely focus on coaching. John Ferguson Jr. was named the team’s new general manager on August 29.

== Regular season ==
=== Season standings ===
Northeast Division
No.	CR		GP	W	L	T	OTL	GF	GA	Pts
1	2	**Boston Bruins**	82	41	19	15	7	209	188	104
2	4	**Toronto Maple Leafs**	82	45	24	10	3	242	204	103
3	5	**Ottawa Senators**	82	43	23	10	6	262	189	102
4	7	**Montreal Canadiens**	82	41	30	7	4	208	192	93
5	9	Buffalo Sabres	82	37	34	7	4	220	221	85

Note: CR = Conference rank; GP = Games played; W = Wins; L = Losses; T = Ties; OTL = Overtime loss; GF = Goals for; GA = Goals against; Pts = Points
Bolded teams qualified for the playoffs.

Eastern Conference
R		Div	GP	W	L	T	OTL	GF	GA	Pts
**1**	**Z-** Tampa Bay Lightning	**SE**	**82**	**46**	**22**	**8**	**6**	**245**	**192**	106
**2**	**Y-** Boston Bruins	**NE**	**82**	**41**	**19**	**15**	**7**	**209**	**188**	104
**3**	**Y-** Philadelphia Flyers	**AT**	**82**	**40**	**21**	**15**	**6**	**209**	**188**	101
**4**	**X-** Toronto Maple Leafs	**NE**	**82**	**45**	**24**	**10**	**3**	**242**	**204**	103
**5**	**X-** Ottawa Senators	**NE**	**82**	**43**	**23**	**10**	**6**	**262**	**189**	102
**6**	**X-** New Jersey Devils	**AT**	**82**	**43**	**25**	**12**	**2**	**213**	**164**	100
**7**	**X-** Montreal Canadiens	**NE**	**82**	**41**	**30**	**7**	**4**	**208**	**192**	93
**8**	**X-** New York Islanders	**AT**	**82**	**38**	**29**	**11**	**4**	**237**	**210**	91
8.5
9	Buffalo Sabres	NE	82	37	34	7	4	220	221	85
10	Atlanta Thrashers	SE	82	33	37	8	4	214	243	78
11	Carolina Hurricanes	SE	82	28	34	14	6	172	209	76
12	Florida Panthers	SE	82	28	35	15	4	188	221	75
13	New York Rangers	AT	82	27	40	7	8	206	250	69
14	Washington Capitals	SE	82	23	46	10	3	186	253	59
15	Pittsburgh Penguins	AT	82	23	47	8	4	190	303	58

Divisions: AT – Atlantic, NE – Northeast, SE – Southeast

Z – Clinched conference; Y – Clinched division; X – Clinched playoff spot

== Schedule and results ==
=== Regular season ===
2003–04 regular season
October: 4–3–2–1 (home: 1–1–1–1; road: 3–2–1–0)

Game	Date	Score	Opponent	Record	Pts	Recap
1	October 11, 2003	0–4	Montreal Canadiens (2003–04)	0–1–0–0	0	L
2	October 13, 2003	2–2 OT	Washington Capitals (2003–04)	0–1–1–0	1	T
3	October 16, 2003	2–2 OT	@ New Jersey Devils (2003–04)	0–1–2–0	2	T
4	October 18, 2003	1–0	@ Montreal Canadiens (2003–04)	1–1–2–0	4	W
5	October 20, 2003	2–5	@ New York Islanders (2003–04)	1–2–2–0	4	L
6	October 22, 2003	3–1	@ Dallas Stars (2003–04)	2–2–2–0	6	W
7	October 23, 2003	5–4	@ Phoenix Coyotes (2003–04)	3–2–2–0	8	W
8	October 25, 2003	4–1	Washington Capitals (2003–04)	4–2–2–0	10	W
9	October 27, 2003	2–3 OT	Atlanta Thrashers (2003–04)	4–2–2–1	11	OTL
10	October 30, 2003	3–5	@ Buffalo Sabres (2003–04)	4–3–2–1	11	L

November: 8–3–3–1 (home: 3–1–0–0; road: 5–2–3–1)

Game	Date	Score	Opponent	Record	Pts	Recap
11	November 1, 2003 †	1–7	Philadelphia Flyers (2003–04)	4–4–2–1	11	L
12	November 2, 2003	2–1	@ Carolina Hurricanes (2003–04)	5–4–2–1	13	W
13	November 4, 2003	4–2	Pittsburgh Penguins (2003–04)	6–4–2–1	15	W
14	November 7, 2003	1–1 OT	@ New Jersey Devils (2003–04)	6–4–3–1	16	T
15	November 8, 2003	4–1	Edmonton Oilers (2003–04)	7–4–3–1	18	W
16	November 12, 2003	1–5	@ Mighty Ducks of Anaheim (2003–04)	7–5–3–1	18	L
17	November 13, 2003	4–4 OT	@ Los Angeles Kings (2003–04)	7–5–4–1	19	T
18	November 15, 2003	2–2 OT	@ San Jose Sharks (2003–04)	7–5–5–1	20	T
19	November 18, 2003	2–3 OT	@ Calgary Flames (2003–04)	7–5–5–2	21	OTL
20	November 20, 2003	2–3	@ Edmonton Oilers (2003–04)	7–6–5–2	21	L
21	November 22, 2003	5–3	@ Vancouver Canucks (2003–04)	8–6–5–2	23	W
22	November 24, 2003	2–1	Vancouver Canucks (2003–04)	9–6–5–2	25	W
23	November 27, 2003	3–1	@ Atlanta Thrashers (2003–04)	10–6–5–2	27	W
24	November 29, 2003	2–1	@ Ottawa Senators (2003–04)	11–6–5–2	29	W
25	November 30, 2003	4–2	@ New York Rangers (2003–04)	12–6–5–2	31	W

December: 9–1–2–1 (home: 6–0–0–1; road: 3–1–2–0)

Game	Date	Score	Opponent	Record	Pts	Recap
26	December 2, 2003	5–4	New York Rangers (2003–04)	13–6–5–2	33	W
27	December 4, 2003	6–0	@ Boston Bruins (2003–04)	14–6–5–2	35	W
28	December 6, 2003	5–2	Detroit Red Wings (2003–04)	15–6–5–2	37	W
29	December 9, 2003	2–3 OT	St. Louis Blues (2003–04)	15–6–5–3	38	OTL
30	December 11, 2003	1–0	@ Minnesota Wild (2003–04)	16–6–5–3	40	W
31	December 13, 2003	3–1	New York Rangers (2003–04)	17–6–5–3	42	W
32	December 16, 2003	3–0	Tampa Bay Lightning (2003–04)	18–6–5–3	44	W
33	December 19, 2003	2–2 OT	@ Washington Capitals (2003–04)	18–6–6–3	45	T
34	December 20, 2003	4–2	Montreal Canadiens (2003–04)	19–6–6–3	47	W
35	December 23, 2003	5–2	Florida Panthers (2003–04)	20–6–6–3	49	W
36	December 26, 2003	6–5 OT	@ New York Rangers (2003–04)	21–6–6–3	51	W
37	December 27, 2003	1–3	@ New York Islanders (2003–04)	21–7–6–3	51	L
38	December 29, 2003	4–4 OT	@ Florida Panthers (2003–04)	21–7–7–3	52	T

January: 8–6–1–0 (home: 4–4–1–0; road: 4–2–0–0)

Game	Date	Score	Opponent	Record	Pts	Recap
39	January 1, 2004	2–3	@ Boston Bruins (2003–04)	21–8–7–3	52	L
40	January 3, 2004	3–3 OT	Buffalo Sabres (2003–04)	21–8–8–3	53	T
41	January 5, 2004	5–0	@ Pittsburgh Penguins (2003–04)	22–8–8–3	55	W
42	January 6, 2004	2–1	Nashville Predators (2003–04)	23–8–8–3	57	W
43	January 8, 2004	1–7	Ottawa Senators (2003–04)	23–9–8–3	57	L
44	January 10, 2004	0–1	New Jersey Devils (2003–04)	23–10–8–3	57	L
45	January 13, 2004	4–1	Calgary Flames (2003–04)	24–10–8–3	59	W
46	January 16, 2004	1–4	@ Philadelphia Flyers (2003–04)	24–11–8–3	59	L
47	January 17, 2004	0–4	Philadelphia Flyers (2003–04)	24–12–8–3	59	L
48	January 20, 2004	2–0	New York Islanders (2003–04)	25–12–8–3	61	W
49	January 21, 2004	3–2	@ Washington Capitals (2003–04)	26–12–8–3	63	W
50	January 24, 2004	4–1	@ Montreal Canadiens (2003–04)	27–12–8–3	65	W
51	January 27, 2004	0–2	Carolina Hurricanes (2003–04)	27–13–8–3	65	L
52	January 30, 2004	4–1	@ Atlanta Thrashers (2003–04)	28–13–8–3	67	W
53	January 31, 2004	5–1	Ottawa Senators (2003–04)	29–13–8–3	69	W

February: 6–6–1–0 (home: 3–4–0–0; road: 3–2–1–0)

Game	Date	Score	Opponent	Record	Pts	Recap
54	February 3, 2004	1–4	Chicago Blackhawks (2003–04)	29–14–8–3	69	L
55	February 5, 2004	5–4 OT	@ Ottawa Senators (2003–04)	30–14–8–3	71	W
56	February 10, 2004	4–4 OT	@ Tampa Bay Lightning (2003–04)	30–14–9–3	72	T
57	February 12, 2004	4–1	Columbus Blue Jackets (2003–04)	31–14–9–3	74	W
58	February 14, 2004	4–6	Buffalo Sabres (2003–04)	31–15–9–3	74	L
59	February 16, 2004	8–4	@ Pittsburgh Penguins (2003–04)	32–15–9–3	76	W
60	February 17, 2004	2–5	Boston Bruins (2003–04)	32–16–9–3	76	L
61	February 19, 2004	2–1 OT	@ Carolina Hurricanes (2003–04)	33–16–9–3	78	W
62	February 21, 2004	5–4	Montreal Canadiens (2003–04)	34–16–9–3	80	W
63	February 23, 2004	1–2	Carolina Hurricanes (2003–04)	34–17–9–3	80	L
64	February 25, 2004	0–4	@ Florida Panthers (2003–04)	34–18–9–3	80	L
65	February 26, 2004	3–4	@ Tampa Bay Lightning (2003–04)	34–19–9–3	80	L
66	February 28, 2004	3–0	New Jersey Devils (2003–04)	35–19–9–3	82	W

March: 8–5–1–0 (home: 5–4–1–0; road: 3–1–0–0)

Game	Date	Score	Opponent	Record	Pts	Recap
67	March 2, 2004	3–2	Boston Bruins (2003–04)	36–19–9–3	84	W
68	March 4, 2004	6–2	New York Islanders (2003–04)	37–19–9–3	86	W
69	March 6, 2004	1–5	Buffalo Sabres (2003–04)	37–20–9–3	86	L
70	March 9, 2004	5–0	Florida Panthers (2003–04)	38–20–9–3	88	W
71	March 11, 2004	2–3	Pittsburgh Penguins (2003–04)	38–21–9–3	88	L
72	March 13, 2004	3–4	@ Montreal Canadiens (2003–04)	38–22–9–3	88	L
73	March 15, 2004	6–5 OT	@ Buffalo Sabres (2003–04)	39–22–9–3	90	W
74	March 16, 2004	1–2	Boston Bruins (2003–04)	39–23–9–3	90	L
75	March 18, 2004	3–2	@ Philadelphia Flyers (2003–04)	40–23–9–3	92	W
76	March 20, 2004	5–2	Colorado Avalanche (2003–04)	41–23–9–3	94	W
77	March 23, 2004	2–7	Tampa Bay Lightning (2003–04)	41–24–9–3	94	L
78	March 25, 2004	3–0	@ Boston Bruins (2003–04)	42–24–9–3	96	W
79	March 27, 2004	2–2 OT	Ottawa Senators (2003–04)	42–24–10–3	97	T
80	March 29, 2004	4–2	Atlanta Thrashers (2003–04)	43–24–10–3	99	W

April: 2–0–0–0 (home: 0–0–0–0; road: 2–0–0–0)

Game	Date	Score	Opponent	Record	Pts	Recap
81	April 2, 2004	2–0	@ Buffalo Sabres (2003–04)	44–24–10–3	101	W
82	April 3, 2004	6–0	@ Ottawa Senators (2003–04)	45–24–10–3	103	W

Legend: W Win (2 points) L Loss (0 points) T Tie (1 point) OTL Overtime loss (1 point)

- † Hockey Hall of Fame Game

=== Playoffs ===
2004 Stanley Cup playoffs
Eastern Conference Quarterfinals vs. (5) Ottawa Senators – Maple Leafs win 4–3

Game	Date	Visitor	Score	Home	OT	Attendance	Series	Recap
1	April 8	Ottawa	4–2	Toronto		19,535	Senators lead 1–0	L
2	April 10	Ottawa	0–2	Toronto		19,529	Series tied 1–1	W
3	April 12	Toronto	2–0	Ottawa		18,500	Maple Leafs lead 2–1	W
4	April 14	Toronto	1–4	Ottawa		18,500	Series tied 2–2	L
5	April 16	Ottawa	0–2	Toronto		19,584	Maple Leafs lead 3–2	W
6	April 18	Toronto	1–2	Ottawa	2OT	18,500	Series tied 3–3	L
7	April 20	Ottawa	1–4	Toronto		19,646	Maple Leafs win 4–3	W

Eastern Conference Semifinals vs. (3) Philadelphia Flyers – Flyers win 4–2

Game	Date	Visitor	Score	Home	OT	Attendance	Series	Recap
1	April 22	Toronto	3–1	Philadelphia		19,447	Flyers lead 1–0	L
2	April 25	Toronto	2–1	Philadelphia		19,792	Flyers lead 2–0	L
3	April 28	Philadelphia	1–4	Toronto		19,628	Flyers lead 2–1	W
4	April 30	Philadelphia	1–3	Toronto		19,614	Series tied 2–2	W
5	May 2	Toronto	7–2	Philadelphia		19,825	Flyers lead 3–2	L
6	May 4	Philadelphia	3–2	Toronto	OT	19,625	Flyers win 4–2	L

Legend: W Win L Loss

== Player statistics ==
=== Scoring ===
- Position abbreviations: C = Centre; D = Defence; G = Goaltender; LW = Left wing; RW = Right wing
- † = Joined team via a transaction (e.g., trade, waivers, signing) during the season. Stats reflect time with the Maple Leafs only.
- ‡ = Left team via a transaction (e.g., trade, waivers, release) during the season. Stats reflect time with the Maple Leafs only.

No.	Player	Pos	Regular season						Playoffs					
No.	Player	Pos	GP	G	A	Pts	+/-	PIM	GP	G	A	Pts	+/-	PIM
13	Mats Sundin	C	81	31	44	75	11	52	9	4	5	9	−2	8
24	Bryan McCabe	D	75	16	37	53	22	86	13	3	5	8	0	14
25	Joe Nieuwendyk	C	64	22	28	50	7	26	9	6	0	6	0	4
7	Gary Roberts	LW	72	28	20	48	9	84	13	4	4	8	−3	10
11	Owen Nolan	RW	65	19	29	48	4	110	—	—	—	—	—	—
16	Darcy Tucker	LW	64	21	11	32	4	68	12	2	0	2	−3	14
80	Nik Antropov	C	62	13	18	31	7	62	13	0	2	2	1	18
15	Tomas Kaberle	D	71	3	28	31	16	18	13	0	3	3	1	6
21	Robert Reichel	C	69	11	19	30	2	30	12	0	2	2	4	8
89	Alexander Mogilny	RW	37	8	22	30	9	12	13	2	4	6	−1	8
22	Ken Klee	D	66	4	25	29	−1	36	11	0	0	0	−1	6
23	Alexei Ponikarovsky	LW	73	9	19	28	14	44	13	1	3	4	−1	8
14	Matt Stajan	C	69	14	13	27	7	22	3	0	0	0	0	2
19	Mikael Renberg	LW	59	12	13	25	−1	50	2	0	0	0	0	4
28	Tie Domi	RW	80	7	13	20	−2	208	13	2	2	4	4	41
29	Karel Pilar	D	50	2	17	19	2	22	1	1	0	1	1	0
12	Tom Fitzgerald	C	69	7	10	17	−2	52	10	0	0	0	0	6
2	Brian Leetch†	D	15	2	13	15	11	10	13	0	8	8	1	6
10	Ron Francis†	C	12	3	7	10	3	0	12	0	4	4	0	2
8	Aki Berg	D	79	2	7	9	−1	40	10	0	0	0	−3	2
55	Ric Jackman‡	D	29	2	4	6	−11	13	—	—	—	—	—	—
9	Calle Johansson†	D	8	0	6	6	5	0	4	0	0	0	−1	2
27	Bryan Marchment	D	75	1	3	4	4	106	13	0	0	0	0	8
18	Harold Druken	C	9	0	4	4	4	2	—	—	—	—	—	—
55	Drake Berehowsky†	D	9	1	2	3	5	17	—	—	—	—	—	—
26	Nathan Perrott	RW	40	1	2	3	−1	116	—	—	—	—	—	—
3 (Note: Belak originally wore number 2 prior to Leetch being acquired.)	Wade Belak	D	34	1	1	2	0	109	4	0	0	0	0	14
33	Craig Johnson†‡	C	10	1	1	2	0	6	—	—	—	—	—	—
18	Chad Kilger†	LW	5	1	1	2	2	2	13	2	1	3	0	0
20	Ed Belfour	G	59	0	2	2		16	13	0	0	0		8
37	Trevor Kidd	G	15	0	2	2		2	1	0	0	0		0
45	Carlo Colaiacovo	D	2	0	1	1	1	2	—	—	—	—	—	—
3	Pierre Hedin	D	3	0	1	1	−1	0	—	—	—	—	—	—
9	Josh Holden	C	1	0	0	0	0	0	—	—	—	—	—	—
34	Maxim Kondratiev‡	D	7	0	0	0	0	2	—	—	—	—	—	—
38	Brad Leeb	RW	1	0	0	0	−1	0	—	—	—	—	—	—
32	Mikael Tellqvist	G	11	0	0	0		0	—	—	—	—	—	—
42	Kyle Wellwood	C	1	0	0	0	−1	0	—	—	—	—	—	—
39	Clarke Wilm†	C	10	0	0	0	0	7	5	0	1	1	−1	2

=== Goaltending ===
No.	Player	Regular season										Playoffs								
No.	Player	GP	W	L	T	SA	GA	GAA	SV%	SO	TOI	GP	W	L	SA	GA	GAA	SV%	SO	TOI
20	Ed Belfour	59	34	19	6	1483	122	2.13	.918	10	3444	13	6	7	379	27	2.09	.929	3	774
37	Trevor Kidd	15	6	5	2	388	48	3.26	.876	1	883	1	0	0	11	1	1.82	.909	0	33
32	Mikael Tellqvist	11	5	3	2	293	31	2.87	.894	0	647	—	—	—	—	—	—	—	—	—

== Awards and records ==
=== Awards ===
Type	Award/honor	Recipient	Ref
League (annual)	NHL Second All-Star Team	Bryan McCabe (Defence)	
League (annual)	NHL Second All-Star Team	Mats Sundin (Centre)	
League (in-season)	NHL All-Star Game selection	Pat Quinn (coach)	
League (in-season)	NHL All-Star Game selection	Gary Roberts	
League (in-season)	NHL All-Star Game selection	Mats Sundin	
League (in-season)	NHL Defensive Player of the Week	Ed Belfour (January 26)	
League (in-season)	NHL Defensive Player of the Week	Ed Belfour (April 5)	
League (in-season)	NHL Offensive Player of the Week	Brian Leetch (March 22)	
League (in-season)	NHL YoungStars Game selection	Matt Stajan (Note: Injury replacement for Garnet Exelby of the Atlanta Thrashers.)	
Team	Molson Cup	Ed Belfour	

=== Milestones ===
Milestone	Player	Date	Ref
First game	Maxim Kondratiev	October 11, 2003	
First game	Kyle Wellwood	January 8, 2004	
First game	Pierre Hedin	January 13, 2004	
600th assist	Mats Sundin	December 16, 2003	
1,000th game played	Tom Fitzgerald	January 13, 2004	
1,000th game played	Gary Roberts	January 13, 2004	
1,000th point	Alexander Mogilny	March 15, 2004	

== Transactions ==
The Maple Leafs were involved in the following transactions from June 10, 2003, the day after the deciding game of the 2003 Stanley Cup Finals, through June 7, 2004, the day of the deciding game of the 2004 Stanley Cup Finals.

=== Trades ===
Date	Details		Ref
June 21, 2003	To Minnesota Wild: 3rd-round pick in 2003	To Toronto Maple Leafs: 3rd-round pick in 2003; 4th-round pick in 2003	
February 11, 2004	To Pittsburgh Penguins: Ric Jackman	To Toronto Maple Leafs: Drake Berehowsky	
March 3, 2004	To New York Rangers: Maxim Kondratiev; Rights to Jarkko Immonen; 1st round pick in 2004; 2nd-round pick in 2005	To Toronto Maple Leafs: Brian Leetch; Conditional draft pick (Note: 4th-round pick in 2004)	
March 9, 2004	To Carolina Hurricanes: 4th-round pick in 2005	To Toronto Maple Leafs: Ron Francis	

=== Players acquired ===
Date	Player	Former team	Term	Via	Ref
July 11, 2003	Bryan Marchment	Colorado Avalanche	1-year	Free agency	
September 9, 2003	Joe Nieuwendyk	New Jersey Devils	1-year	Free agency	
September 27, 2003	Ken Klee	Washington Capitals	1-year	Free agency	
October 3, 2003	Petr Tenkrat	Columbus Blue Jackets		Waiver draft	
October 28, 2003	Clarke Wilm	Nashville Predators	1-year	Free agency	
January 10, 2004	Craig Johnson	Anaheim Mighty Ducks		Waivers	
March 9, 2004	Calle Johansson	Washington Capitals	1-year	Free agency	
March 9, 2004	Chad Kilger	Montreal Canadiens		Waivers	
May 27, 2004	Ben Ondrus	St. John's Maple Leafs (AHL)	3-year	Free agency	
May 27, 2004	Andy Wozniewski	St. John's Maple Leafs (AHL)	3-year	Free agency	
June 2, 2004	Chris St. Jacques	Medicine Hat Tigers (WHL)	3-year	Free agency	

=== Players lost ===
Date	Player	New team	Via (Note: In parentheses is the player's free agency group on July 1 if applicable.)	Ref
June 19, 2003	Jyrki Lumme (Note: Lumme was inactive during the 2003–04 season.)		Buyout	
July 8, 2003	Glen Wesley	Carolina Hurricanes	Free agency (III)	
July 28, 2003	Doug Doull	Boston Bruins	Free agency (UFA)	
July 28, 2003	Paul Healey	New York Rangers	Free agency (UFA)	
September 4, 2003	Jonas Hoglund	Florida Panthers	Free agency (UFA)	
September 4, 2003	Robert Svehla		Retirement	
September 8, 2003	Doug Gilmour		Retirement (III)	
September 20, 2003	Craig Mills		Retirement (VI)	
October 3, 2003	Travis Green	Columbus Blue Jackets	Waiver draft	
October 28, 2003	Ryan Bonni	Greensboro Generals (ECHL)	Free agency (UFA)	
November 17, 2003	Dmitri Yakushin	Aalborg Ishockey (Ligaen)	Free agency	
January 16, 2004	Phil Housley		Retirement (III)	
March 5, 2004	Craig Johnson	Washington Capitals	Waivers	
May 26, 2004	Mikael Renberg	Lulea HF (SHL)	Free agency	

=== Signings ===
Date	Player	Term	Contract type	Ref
June 30, 2003	Maxim Kondratiev	3-year	Entry-level	
July 14, 2003	Nathan Perrott	2-year	Re-signing	
July 15, 2003	Ric Jackman	1-year	Re-signing	
July 16, 2003	Wade Belak	2-year	Re-signing	
July 16, 2003	Jamie Hodson	1-year	Re-signing	
July 18, 2003	Alexei Ponikarovsky	1-year	Re-signing	
July 24, 2003	Harold Druken	1-year	Re-signing	
July 28, 2003	Josh Holden	1-year	Re-signing	
August 22, 2003	Bryan McCabe	1-year	Re-signing	
September 5, 2003	Nik Antropov	1-year	Re-signing	
September 26, 2003	Brad Leeb	1-year	Re-signing	
October 28, 2003	Karel Pilar	2-year	Re-signing	
April 1, 2004	Jeremy Williams	3-year	Entry-level	
May 27, 2004	Dominic D'Amour	3-year	Entry-level	
June 1, 2004	Todd Ford	3-year	Entry-level	

== Draft picks ==
Toronto's draft picks at the 2003 NHL entry draft held at the Gaylord Entertainment Center in Nashville, Tennessee.

Round	#	Player	Nationality	College/Junior/Club team (League)
2	57	John Doherty	United States	Phillips Academy (USHS-MA)
3	91	Martin Sagat	Slovakia	Dukla Trenčín (Slovakia)
4	125	Konstantin Volkov	Russia	Dynamo Moscow (Russia)
5	158	John Mitchell	Canada	Plymouth Whalers (OHL)
7	220	Jeremy Williams	Canada	Swift Current Broncos (WHL)
8	237	Shaun Landolt	Canada	Calgary Hitmen (WHL)

== Farm teams ==
- St. John's Maple Leafs (AHL)
- Memphis RiverKings (CHL)

== See also ==
- 2003–04 NHL season
