= 2003–04 Tampa Bay Lightning season =

National Hockey League team season

2003–04 Tampa Bay Lightning
- Stanley Cup champions
- Eastern Conference champions
- Southeast Division champions
- Division: 1st Southeast
- Conference: 1st Eastern
- 2003–04 record: 46–22–8–6
- Home record: 24–10–4–3
- Road record: 22–12–4–3
- Goals for: 245
- Goals against: 192

Team information
- General manager: Jay Feaster
- Coach: John Tortorella
- Captain: Dave Andreychuk
- Alternate captains: Vincent Lecavalier; Fredrik Modin
- Arena: St. Pete Times Forum
- Average attendance: 17,820 (92.79%)
- Minor league affiliates: Hamilton Bulldogs; Hershey Bears; Pensacola Ice Pilots

Team leaders
- Goals: Martin St. Louis (38)
- Assists: Martin St. Louis (56)
- Points: Martin St. Louis (94)
- Penalty minutes: Chris Dingman (140)
- Plus/minus: Martin St. Louis (+35)
- Wins: Nikolai Khabibulin (28)
- Goals against average: John Grahame (2.06)

The 2003–04 Tampa Bay Lightning season was the 12th National Hockey League season in Tampa, Florida. The Lightning won their first Stanley Cup over the Calgary Flames this season, after the Flames were attempting to be the first Canadian team to win a Stanley Cup since the 1993 Montreal Canadiens.

The Lightning's 1st Stanley Cup championship came just a year after their NFL (National Football League) counterparts, the Tampa Bay Buccaneers, won Super Bowl XXXVII, also their 1st championship.

== Offseason ==
The Lightning did not have a first-round pick. For their first pick, they chose Mike Egener in the second round, 35th overall.

== Regular season ==
On Saturday, December 27, 2003, the Lightning scored three short-handed goals in a 4–2 win over the Boston Bruins.

The Lightning finished the regular season having tied the Detroit Red Wings for the most short-handed goals scored, with 15.

=== Season standings ===
Southeast Division
No.	CR		GP	W	L	T	OTL	GF	GA	PTS
1	1	**Tampa Bay Lightning**	82	46	22	8	6	245	192	106
2	10	Atlanta Thrashers	82	33	37	8	4	214	243	78
3	11	Carolina Hurricanes	82	28	34	14	6	172	209	76
4	12	Florida Panthers	82	28	35	15	4	188	221	75
5	14	Washington Capitals	82	23	46	10	3	186	253	59

Note: CR = Conference rank; GP = Games played; W = Wins; L = Losses; T = Ties; OTL = Overtime loss; GF = Goals for; GA = Goals against; Pts = Points
Bolded teams qualified for the playoffs.

Eastern Conference
R		Div	GP	W	L	T	OTL	GF	GA	Pts
**1**	**Z-** Tampa Bay Lightning	**SE**	**82**	**46**	**22**	**8**	**6**	**245**	**192**	106
**2**	**Y-** Boston Bruins	**NE**	**82**	**41**	**19**	**15**	**7**	**209**	**188**	104
**3**	**Y-** Philadelphia Flyers	**AT**	**82**	**40**	**21**	**15**	**6**	**209**	**188**	101
**4**	**X-** Toronto Maple Leafs	**NE**	**82**	**45**	**24**	**10**	**3**	**242**	**204**	103
**5**	**X-** Ottawa Senators	**NE**	**82**	**43**	**23**	**10**	**6**	**262**	**189**	102
**6**	**X-** New Jersey Devils	**AT**	**82**	**43**	**25**	**12**	**2**	**213**	**164**	100
**7**	**X-** Montreal Canadiens	**NE**	**82**	**41**	**30**	**7**	**4**	**208**	**192**	93
**8**	**X-** New York Islanders	**AT**	**82**	**38**	**29**	**11**	**4**	**237**	**210**	91
8.5
9	Buffalo Sabres	NE	82	37	34	7	4	220	221	85
10	Atlanta Thrashers	SE	82	33	37	8	4	214	243	78
11	Carolina Hurricanes	SE	82	28	34	14	6	172	209	76
12	Florida Panthers	SE	82	28	35	15	4	188	221	75
13	New York Rangers	AT	82	27	40	7	8	206	250	69
14	Washington Capitals	SE	82	23	46	10	3	186	253	59
15	Pittsburgh Penguins	AT	82	23	47	8	4	190	303	58

Divisions: AT – Atlantic, NE – Northeast, SE – Southeast

Z – Clinched conference; Y – Clinched division; X – Clinched playoff spot

== Schedule and results ==
=== Regular season ===
2003–04 regular season
October: 6–0–1–0, 13 points (home: 4–0–1–0; road: 2–0–0–0)

Game	Date	Opponent	Score	OT	Decision	Location	Attendance	Record	Points	Recap
1	October 10	Boston Bruins	5–1		Khabibulin	St. Pete Times Forum	20,454	1–0–0–0	2	W
2	October 16	Phoenix Coyotes	5–1		Khabibulin	St. Pete Times Forum	12,784	2–0–0–0	4	W
3	October 18	@ New Jersey Devils	3–2		Khabibulin	Continental Airlines Arena	15,590	3–0–0–0	6	W
4	October 21	Atlanta Thrashers	3–2	OT	Khabibulin	St. Pete Times Forum	14,822	4–0–0–0	8	W
5	October 23	@ Columbus Blue Jackets	1–0		Grahame	Nationwide Arena	16,542	5–0–0–0	10	W
6	October 25	Minnesota Wild	3–2		Khabibulin	St. Pete Times Forum	16,223	6–0–0–0	12	W
7	October 30	San Jose Sharks	2–2	OT	Khabibulin	St. Pete Times Forum	17,609	6–0–1–0	13	T

November: 5–4–3–1, 14 points (home: 4–2–1–1; road: 1–2–2–0)

Game	Date	Opponent	Score	OT	Decision	Location	Attendance	Record	Points	Recap
8	November 1	Carolina Hurricanes	4–3		Khabibulin	St. Pete Times Forum	16,616	7–0–1–0	15	W
9	November 4	Washington Capitals	1–5		Khabibulin	St. Pete Times Forum	14,312	7–1–1–0	15	L
10	November 6	Los Angeles Kings	0–1	OT	Grahame	St. Pete Times Forum	14,287	7–1–1–1	16	OTL
11	November 8	Pittsburgh Penguins	9–0		Khabibulin	St. Pete Times Forum	18,262	8–1–1–1	18	W
12	November 9	@ Carolina Hurricanes	1–1	OT	Grahame	RBC Center	9,821	8–1–2–1	19	T
13	November 11	@ Florida Panthers	0–4		Khabibulin	Office Depot Center	13,214	8–2–2–1	19	L
14	November 14	@ Washington Capitals	5–2		Grahame	MCI Center	14,536	9–2–2–1	21	W
15	November 20	New York Islanders	3–2		Khabibulin	St. Pete Times Forum	14,898	10–2–2–1	23	W
16	November 22	Buffalo Sabres	2–1		Grahame	St. Pete Times Forum	20,112	11–2–2–1	25	W
17	November 23	@ Carolina Hurricanes	0–0	OT	Khabibulin	RBC Center	10,391	11–2–3–1	26	T
18	November 25	New York Rangers	0–2		Khabibulin	St. Pete Times Forum	16,034	11–3–3–1	26	L
19	November 28	St. Louis Blues	2–2	OT	Khabibulin	St. Pete Times Forum	18,787	11–3–4–1	27	T
20	November 28	@ Atlanta Thrashers	1–2		Grahame	Philips Arena	16,847	11–4–4–1	27	L

December: 4–9–2–0, 10 points (home: 1–4–1–0; road: 3–5–1–0)

Game	Date	Opponent	Score	OT	Decision	Location	Attendance	Record	Points	Recap
21	December 2	@ Montreal Canadiens	2–3		Khabibulin	Bell Centre	19,858	11–5–4–1	27	L
22	December 4	Ottawa Senators	1–4		Grahame	St. Pete Times Forum	15,221	11–6–4–1	27	L
23	December 6	@ Buffalo Sabres	3–1		Khabibulin	HSBC Arena	15,833	12–6–4–1	29	W
24	December 7	@ New York Rangers	3–2		Grahame	Madison Square Garden	18,200	13–6–4–1	31	W
25	December 9	@ New York Islanders	2–5		Khabibulin	Nassau Veterans Memorial Coliseum	10,860	13–7–4–1	31	L
26	December 11	@ Ottawa Senators	2–3		Khabibulin	Corel Centre	17,256	13–8–4–1	31	L
27	December 13	Montreal Canadiens	2–5		Grahame	St. Pete Times Forum	17,228	13–9–4–1	31	L
28	December 16	@ Toronto Maple Leafs	0–3		Khabibulin	Air Canada Centre	19,331	13–10–4–1	31	L
29	December 18	@ Philadelphia Flyers	5–4	OT	Khabibulin	Wachovia Center	19,332	14–10–4–1	33	W
30	December 20	Dallas Stars	1–2		Khabibulin	St. Pete Times Forum	16,233	14–11–4–1	33	L
31	December 23	@ Boston Bruins	1–1	OT	Khabibulin	FleetCenter	13,266	14–11–5–1	34	T
32	December 26	@ Atlanta Thrashers	1–3		Khabibulin	Philips Arena	18,545	14–12–5–1	34	L
33	December 27	Boston Bruins	4–2		Grahame	St. Pete Times Forum	19,942	15–12–5–1	36	W
34	December 29	Mighty Ducks of Anaheim	0–2		Khabibulin	St. Pete Times Forum	17,662	15–13–5–1	36	L
35	December 31	Florida Panthers	2–2	OT	Khabibulin	St. Pete Times Forum	15,234	15–13–6–1	37	T

January: 11–3–0–2, 24 points (home: 4–1–0–1; road: 7–2–0–1)

Game	Date	Opponent	Score	OT	Decision	Location	Attendance	Record	Points	Recap
36	January 2	Columbus Blue Jackets	0–2		Grahame	St. Pete Times Forum	13,609	15–14–6–1	37	L
37	January 3	Philadelphia Flyers	6–1		Khabibulin	St. Pete Times Forum	19,242	16–14–6–1	39	W
38	January 6	@ Ottawa Senators	2–5		Khabibulin	Corel Centre	16,890	16–15–6–1	39	L
39	January 8	@ Montreal Canadiens	4–1		Grahame	Bell Centre	20,706	17–15–6–1	41	W
40	January 9	@ New Jersey Devils	4–1		Grahame	Continental Airlines Arena	19,040	18–15–6–1	43	W
41	January 11	@ New York Rangers	2–1	OT	Grahame	Madison Square Garden	18,200	19–15–6–1	45	W
42	January 13	@ Pittsburgh Penguins	3–1		Grahame	Mellon Arena	10,039	20–15–6–1	47	W
43	January 15	Carolina Hurricanes	5–4		Khabibulin	St. Pete Times Forum	19,909	21–15–6–1	49	W
44	January 17	@ Florida Panthers	1–2		Grahame	Office Depot Center	19,250	21–16–6–1	49	L
45	January 19	Colorado Avalanche	4–5	OT	Khabibulin	St. Pete Times Forum	19,212	21–16–6–2	50	OTL
46	January 21	@ Vancouver Canucks	4–5	OT	Khabibulin	General Motors Place	18,630	21–16–6–3	51	OTL
47	January 22	@ Edmonton Oilers	3–2		Grahame	Rexall Place	16,839	22–16–6–3	53	W
48	January 24	@ Calgary Flames	6–2		Grahame	Pengrowth Saddledome	17,109	23–16–6–3	55	W
49	January 27	@ Pittsburgh Penguins	6–2		Grahame	Mellon Arena	9,931	24–16–6–3	57	W
50	January 29	Pittsburgh Penguins	5–1		Khabibulin	St. Pete Times Forum	15,847	25–16–6–3	59	W
51	January 31	Atlanta Thrashers	5–2		Grahame	St. Pete Times Forum	20,762	26–16–6–3	61	W

February: 9–1–1–2, 21 points (home: 5–0–1–0; road: 4–1–0–2)

Game	Date	Opponent	Score	OT	Decision	Location	Attendance	Record	Points	Recap
52	February 2	@ Philadelphia Flyers	2–1		Khabibulin	Wachovia Center	19,048	27–16–6–3	63	W
53	February 3	@ Washington Capitals	1–2		Khabibulin	MCI Center	13,085	27–17–6–3	63	L
54	February 5	@ Nashville Predators	5–2		Khabibulin	Gaylord Entertainment Center	9,879	28–17–6–3	65	W
All-Star Break (February 6–9)
55	February 10	Toronto Maple Leafs	4–4	OT	Khabibulin	St. Pete Times Forum	17,222	28–17–7–3	66	T
56	February 12	Montreal Canadiens	5–3		Grahame	St. Pete Times Forum	15,644	29–17–7–3	68	W
57	February 14	Florida Panthers	3–2		Grahame	St. Pete Times Forum	18,888	30–17–7–3	70	W
58	February 17	Philadelphia Flyers	5–2		Khabibulin	St. Pete Times Forum	17,545	31–17–7–3	72	W
59	February 19	@ St. Louis Blues	3–4	OT	Khabibulin	Savvis Center	17,973	31–17–7–4	73	OTL
60	February 20	@ Buffalo Sabres	3–4	OT	Grahame	HSBC Arena	18,124	31–17–7–5	74	OTL
61	February 23	@ Washington Capitals	6–3		Khabibulin	MCI Center	16,051	32–17–7–5	76	W
62	February 25	@ Atlanta Thrashers	4–2		Khabibulin	Philips Arena	14,667	33–17–7–5	78	W
63	February 26	Toronto Maple Leafs	4–3		Khabibulin	St. Pete Times Forum	19,909	34–17–7–5	80	W
64	February 28	Washington Capitals	4–2		Khabibulin	St. Pete Times Forum	20,124	35–17–7–5	82	W

March: 10–4–1–1, 22 points (home: 5–2–0–1; road: 5–2–1–0)

Game	Date	Opponent	Score	OT	Decision	Location	Attendance	Record	Points	Recap
65	March 1	@ Colorado Avalanche	3–0		Khabibulin	Pepsi Center	18,007	36–17–7–5	84	W
66	March 3	@ Chicago Blackhawks	5–3		Khabibulin	United Center	10,702	37–17–7–5	86	W
67	March 5	New Jersey Devils	3–2	OT	Khabibulin	St. Pete Times Forum	20,239	38–17–7–5	88	W
68	March 6	@ Florida Panthers	5–3		Khabibulin	Office Depot Center	17,509	39–17–7–5	90	W
69	March 8	@ Detroit Red Wings	1–1	OT	Khabibulin	Joe Louis Arena	20,066	39–17–8–5	91	T
70	March 10	@ Carolina Hurricanes	4–2		Grahame	RBC Center	13,531	40–17–8–5	93	W
71	March 12	New York Rangers	5–2		Khabibulin	St. Pete Times Forum	20,026	41–17–8–5	95	W
72	March 13	Carolina Hurricanes	1–5		Grahame	St. Pete Times Forum	20,237	41–18–8–5	95	L
73	March 16	New York Islanders	1–3		Khabibulin	St. Pete Times Forum	19,914	41–19–8–5	95	L
74	March 18	Buffalo Sabres	1–3		Khabibulin	St. Pete Times Forum	19,946	42–19–8–5	97	W
75	March 20	@ Boston Bruins	4–5		Khabibulin	FleetCenter	17,565	42–20–8–5	97	L
76	March 21	@ New York Islanders	0–3		Grahame	Nassau Veterans Memorial Coliseum	14,447	42–21–8–5	97	L
77	March 23	@ Toronto Maple Leafs	7–2		Grahame	Air Canada Centre	19,452	43–21–8–5	99	W
78	March 25	New Jersey Devils	2–1		Khabibulin	St. Pete Times Forum	19,013	44–21–8–5	101	W
79	March 27	Washington Capitals	4–1		Khabibulin	St. Pete Times Forum	18,812	45–21–8–5	103	W
80	March 29	Ottawa Senators	4–5	OT	Khabibulin	St. Pete Times Forum	19,844	45–21–8–6	104	OTL

April: 1–1–0–0, 2 points (home: 1–1–0–0; road: 0–0–0–0)

Game	Date	Opponent	Score	OT	Decision	Location	Attendance	Record	Points	Recap
81	April 1	Florida Panthers	4–3		Grahame	St. Pete Times Forum	17,726	46–21–8–6	106	W
82	April 3	Atlanta Thrashers	1–2		Khabibulin	St. Pete Times Forum	20,244	46–22–8–6	106	L

Lightning score listed first;

Legend: W Win (2 points) L Loss (0 points) T Tie (1 point) OTL Overtime loss (1 point)

=== Playoffs ===
2004 Stanley Cup playoffs
Eastern Conference Quarterfinals vs. New York Islanders (8) – Tampa Bay wins series 4–1

Game	Date	Opponent	Score	OT	Decision	Location	Attendance	Series	Recap
1	April 8	New York Islanders	3–0		Khabibulin	St. Pete Times Forum	18,536	Lightning lead 1–0	W
2	April 10	New York Islanders	0–3		Khabibulin	St. Pete Times Forum	19,982	Series tied 1–1	L
3	April 12	@ New York Islanders	3–0		Khabibulin	Nassau Veterans Memorial Coliseum	16,234	Lightning lead 2–1	W
4	April 14	@ New York Islanders	3–0		Khabibulin	Nassau Veterans Memorial Coliseum	16,234	Lightning lead 3–1	W
5	April 16	New York Islanders	3–2	4:07 OT	Khabibulin	St. Pete Times Forum	20,927	Lightning win 4–1	W

Eastern Conference Semifinals vs. Montreal Canadiens (7) – Tampa Bay wins series 4–0

Game	Date	Opponent	Score	OT	Decision	Location	Attendance	Series	Recap
1	April 23	Montreal Canadiens	4–0		Khabibulin	St. Pete Times Forum	18,904	Lightning lead 1–0	W
2	April 25	Montreal Canadiens	3–1		Khabibulin	St. Pete Times Forum	19,435	Lightning lead 2–0	W
3	April 27	@ Montreal Canadiens	3–2	1:05 OT	Khabibulin	Bell Centre	21,273	Lightning lead 3–0	W
4	April 29	@ Montreal Canadiens	3–1		Khabibulin	Bell Centre	21,273	Lightning win 4–0	W

Eastern Conference Finals vs. Philadelphia Flyers (3) – Tampa Bay wins series 4–3

Game	Date	Opponent	Score	OT	Decision	Location	Attendance	Series	Recap
1	May 8	Philadelphia Flyers	3–1		Khabibulin	St. Pete Times Forum	21,425	Lightning lead 1–0	W
2	May 10	Philadelphia Flyers	2–6		Khabibulin	St. Pete Times Forum	21,314	Series tied 1–1	L
3	May 13	@ Philadelphia Flyers	4–1		Khabibulin	Wachovia Center	19,897	Lightning lead 2–1	W
4	May 15	@ Philadelphia Flyers	2–3		Khabibulin	Wachovia Center	19,872	Series tied 2–2	L
5	May 18	Philadelphia Flyers	4–2		Khabibulin	St. Pete Times Forum	21,517	Lightning lead 3–2	W
6	May 20	@ Philadelphia Flyers	4–5	18:18 OT	Khabibulin	Wachovia Center	19,910	Series tied 3–3	L
7	May 22	Philadelphia Flyers	2–1		Khabibulin	St. Pete Times Forum	22,117	Lightning win 4–3	W

Stanley Cup Finals vs. Calgary Flames (6W) – Tampa Bay wins series 4–3

Game	Date	Opponent	Score	OT	Decision	Location	Attendance	Series	Recap
1	May 25	Calgary Flames	1–4		Khabibulin	St. Pete Times Forum	21,674	Flames lead 1–0	L
2	May 27	Calgary Flames	4–1		Khabibulin	St. Pete Times Forum	22,222	Series tied 1–1	W
3	May 29	@ Calgary Flames	0–3		Khabibulin	Pengrowth Saddledome	19,221	Flames lead 2–1	L
4	May 31	@ Calgary Flames	1–0		Khabibulin	Pengrowth Saddledome	19,221	Series tied 2–2	W
5	June 3	Calgary Flames	2–3	14:40 OT	Khabibulin	St. Pete Times Forum	22,426	Flames lead 3–2	L
6	June 5	@ Calgary Flames	3–2	0:33 2OT	Khabibulin	Pengrowth Saddledome	19,221	Series tied 3–3	W
7	June 7	Calgary Flames	2–1		Khabibulin	St. Pete Times Forum	22,717	Lightning win 4–3	W

Lightning score listed first;

Legend: W Win L Loss

== Player statistics ==
=== Scoring ===
- Position abbreviations: C = Center; D = Defense; G = Goaltender; LW = Left wing; RW = Right wing
- † = Joined team via a transaction (e.g., trade, waivers, signing) during the season. Stats reflect time with the Lightning only.
- ‡ = Left team via a transaction (e.g., trade, waivers, release) during the season. Stats reflect time with the Lightning only.

No.	Player	Pos	Regular season						Playoffs					
No.	Player	Pos	GP	G	A	Pts	+/-	PIM	GP	G	A	Pts	+/-	PIM
26	Martin St. Louis	RW	82	38	56	94	35	24	23	9	15	24	6	14
61	Cory Stillman	LW	81	25	55	80	18	36	21	2	5	7	2	15
19	Brad Richards	C	82	26	53	79	14	12	23	12	14	26	5	4
4	Vincent Lecavalier	C	81	32	34	66	23	52	23	9	7	16	−2	25
33	Fredrik Modin	LW	82	29	28	57	31	32	23	8	11	19	7	10
25	Dave Andreychuk	RW	82	21	18	39	−9	42	23	1	13	14	−2	14
17	Ruslan Fedotenko	LW	77	17	22	39	14	30	22	12	2	14	0	14
22	Dan Boyle	D	78	9	30	39	23	60	23	2	8	10	7	16
13	Pavel Kubina	D	81	17	18	35	9	85	22	0	4	4	0	50
27	Tim Taylor	C	82	7	15	22	−5	25	23	2	3	5	−2	31
37	Brad Lukowich	D	79	5	14	19	29	24	18	0	2	2	4	6
21	Cory Sarich	D	82	3	16	19	5	89	23	0	2	2	1	25
29	Dmitry Afanasenkov	RW	71	6	10	16	−4	12	23	1	2	3	−3	6
7	Ben Clymer	RW	66	2	8	10	5	50	5	0	0	0	0	0
8	Martin Cibak	C	63	2	7	9	−1	30	6	0	1	1	0	0
5	Jassen Cullimore	D	79	2	5	7	8	58	11	0	2	2	7	6
55	Darryl Sydor†	D	31	1	6	7	3	6	23	0	6	6	−4	9
11	Chris Dingman	LW	74	1	5	6	−9	140	23	1	1	2	1	63
24	Shane Willis	RW	12	0	6	6	1	2	—	—	—	—	—	—
44	Nolan Pratt	D	58	1	3	4	11	42	20	0	0	0	0	8
16	Alexander Svitov‡	C	11	0	3	3	0	4	—	—	—	—	—	—
36	Andre Roy	RW	33	1	1	2	−5	78	21	1	2	3	3	61
9	Eric Perrin	C	4	0	0	0	−1	0	12	0	1	1	0	6
38	Darren Rumble	D	5	0	0	0	−2	2	—	—	—	—	—	—
35	Nikolai Khabibulin	G	55	0	2	2		12	23	0	0	0		0
47	John Grahame	G	29	0	0	0		4	1	0	0	0		0
2	Stan Neckar†	D	—	—	—	—	—	—	2	0	0	0	1	0

=== Goaltending ===
No.	Player	Regular season										Playoffs								
No.	Player	GP	W	L	T	SA	GA	GAA	SV%	SO	TOI	GP	W	L	SA	GA	GAA	SV%	SO	TOI
35	Nikolai Khabibulin	55	28	19	7	1414	127	2.33	.910	3	3274	23	16	7	598	40	1.71	.933	5	1401
47	John Grahame	29	18	9	1	664	58	2.06	.913	1	1688	1	0	0	17	2	3.53	.882	0	34

== Awards and records ==
=== Awards ===
Type	Award/honor	Recipient	Ref
League (annual)	Art Ross Trophy	Martin St. Louis	
League (annual)	Conn Smythe Trophy	Brad Richards	
League (annual)	Hart Memorial Trophy	Martin St. Louis	
League (annual)	Jack Adams Award	John Tortorella	
League (annual)	Lady Byng Memorial Trophy	Brad Richards	
League (annual)	Lester B. Pearson Award	Martin St. Louis	
League (annual)	NHL First All-Star Team	Martin St. Louis (Right wing)	
League (annual)	NHL Plus-Minus Award	Martin St. Louis (Note: Shared with Marek Malik of the Vancouver Canucks.)	
League (in-season)	NHL All-Star Game selection	Pavel Kubina (Note: Kubina replaced an injured Wade Redden of the Ottawa Senators.)	
League (in-season)	NHL All-Star Game selection	Martin St. Louis	
League (in-season)	NHL Defensive Player of the Month	Nikolai Khabibulin (October)	
League (in-season)	NHL Defensive Player of the Week	Jassen Cullimore & Cory Sarich (November 24)	
League (in-season)	NHL Defensive Player of the Week	Nikolai Khabibulin (March 8)	
League (in-season)	NHL Offensive Player of the Month	Martin St. Louis (January)	
League (in-season)	NHL Offensive Player of the Month	Martin St. Louis (February)	
League (in-season)	NHL Offensive Player of the Week	Vincent Lecavalier (February 16)	

=== Milestones ===
Milestone	Player	Date	Ref
First game	Eric Perrin	March 27, 2004	

== Transactions ==
The Lightning were involved in the following transactions from June 10, 2003, the day after the deciding game of the 2003 Stanley Cup Finals, through June 7, 2004, the day of the deciding game of the 2004 Stanley Cup Finals.

=== Trades ===
Date	Details		Ref
June 21, 2003	To Florida Panthers: 1st-round pick in 2003	To Tampa Bay Lightning: 2nd-round pick in 2003; 2nd-round pick in 2003; 6th-round pick in 2003	
June 21, 2003	To St. Louis Blues: 2nd-round pick in 2003	To Tampa Bay Lightning: Cory Stillman	
June 22, 2003	To Philadelphia Flyers: 7th-round pick in 2004; 9th-round pick in 2004	To Tampa Bay Lightning: 8th-round pick in 2003; 9th-round pick in 2003	
October 27, 2003	To St. Louis Blues: Erkki Rajamaki	To Tampa Bay Lightning: 8th-round pick in 2004	
January 27, 2004	To Columbus Blue Jackets: Alexander Svitov; 3rd-round pick in 2004	To Tampa Bay Lightning: Darryl Sydor; 4th-round pick in 2004	
February 25, 2004	To Nashville Predators: 8th-round pick in 2004	To Tampa Bay Lightning: Timo Helbling	
March 9, 2004	To Nashville Predators: 6th-round pick in 2004	To Tampa Bay Lightning: Stan Neckar	

=== Players acquired ===
Date	Player	Former team	Term	Via	Ref
June 19, 2003	Eric Perrin	JYP (Liiga)		Free agency	
July 23, 2003	Pascal Trepanier	Florida Panthers		Free agency	
October 17, 2003	Dwayne Hay	St. John's Maple Leafs (AHL)		Free agency	
October 24, 2003	Sheldon Keefe	New York Rangers		Waivers	

=== Players lost ===
Date	Player	New team	Via (Note: In parentheses is the player's free agency group on July 1 if applicable.)	Ref
July 3, 2003	Kristian Kudroc	Florida Panthers	Free agency (UFA)	
July 14, 2003	Boyd Kane	Philadelphia Flyers	Free agency (VI)	
July 17, 2003	Vaclav Prospal	Anaheim Mighty Ducks	Free agency (V)	
September 1, 2003	Ryan Tobler	Colorado Eagles (CHL)	Free agency (VI)	
September 29, 2003	Corey Foster	St. Jean Mission (QSPHL)	Free agency (VI)	
October 3, 2003	Sheldon Keefe	New York Rangers	Waiver draft	
October 5, 2003	Matt Elich	Pensacola Ice Pilots (ECHL)	Free agency (UFA)	
October 5, 2003	Kenton Smith	Columbus Cottonmouths (ECHL)	Free agency (UFA)	
October 19, 2003	Harlan Pratt	HC TPS (Liiga)	Free agency (UFA)	
October 31, 2003	Janne Laukkanen (Note: Laukkanen retired.)		Buyout	
November 26, 2003	Stan Neckar	Nashville Predators	Free agency (UFA)	

=== Signings ===
Date	Player	Term	Contract type	Ref
June 26, 2003	Dave Andreychuk		Re-signing	
July 2, 2003	Gerard Dicaire	3-year	Entry-level	
July 10, 2003	Ryan Craig		Entry-level	
July 10, 2003	Andreas Holmqvist		Entry-level	
July 15, 2003	Evgeny Artyukhin	3-year	Entry-level	
July 15, 2003	Brad Lukowich	multi-year	Re-signing	
July 15, 2003	Andre Roy	multi-year	Re-signing	
July 15, 2003	Darren Rumble	1-year	Re-signing	
July 17, 2003	Fredrik Modin	1-year	Re-signing	
July 18, 2003	John Grahame	3-year	Re-signing	
July 22, 2003	Ben Clymer	1-year	Re-signing	
July 29, 2003	Dmitri Afanasenkov		Re-signing	
July 29, 2003	Martin Cibak		Re-signing	
July 30, 2003	Sheldon Keefe		Re-signing	
July 30, 2003	Shane Willis		Re-signing	
August 8, 2003	Janne Laukkanen	1-year	Re-signing	
August 13, 2003	Cory Stillman	1-year	Re-signing	
August 16, 2003	Nolan Pratt	1-year	Re-signing	
August 20, 2003	Dan Boyle	multi-year	Re-signing	
August 27, 2003	Brad Richards	multi-year	Re-signing	
June 1, 2004	Adam Henrich		Entry-level	
June 1, 2004	Paul Ranger		Entry-level	
June 1, 2004	Darren Reid		Entry-level	

== Draft picks ==
Tampa Bay's draft picks at the 2003 NHL entry draft held at the Gaylord Entertainment Center in Nashville, Tennessee.

Round	#	Player	Position	Nationality	College/junior/club team
2	34	Mike Egener	Defense	Germany	Calgary Hitmen (WHL)
2	41	Matt Smaby	Defense	United States	Shattuck-Saint Mary's (Midget Major AAA)
3	96	Jonathan Boutin	Goalie	Canada	Halifax Mooseheads (QMJHL)
6	192	Doug O'Brien	Defense	Canada	Hull Olympiques (QMJHL)
7	224	Gerald Coleman	Goalie	United States	London Knights (OHL)
7	227	Jay Rosehill	Left wing	Canada	Olds Grizzlys (AJHL)
8	255	Raimonds Danilics	Forward	Latvia	Stalkers (LHL)
8	256	Brady Greco	Defense	United States	Chicago Steel (USHL)
9	273	Albert Vishnyakov	Left wing	Russia	Ak Bars Kazan (KHL)
9	286	Zbynek Hrdel	Center	Czech Republic	Rimouski Océanic (QMJHL)
9	287	Nick Tarnasky	Center	Canada	Lethbridge Hurricanes (WHL)

== See also ==
- 2003–04 NHL season
