= Philippe Seydoux =

Swiss ice hockey player

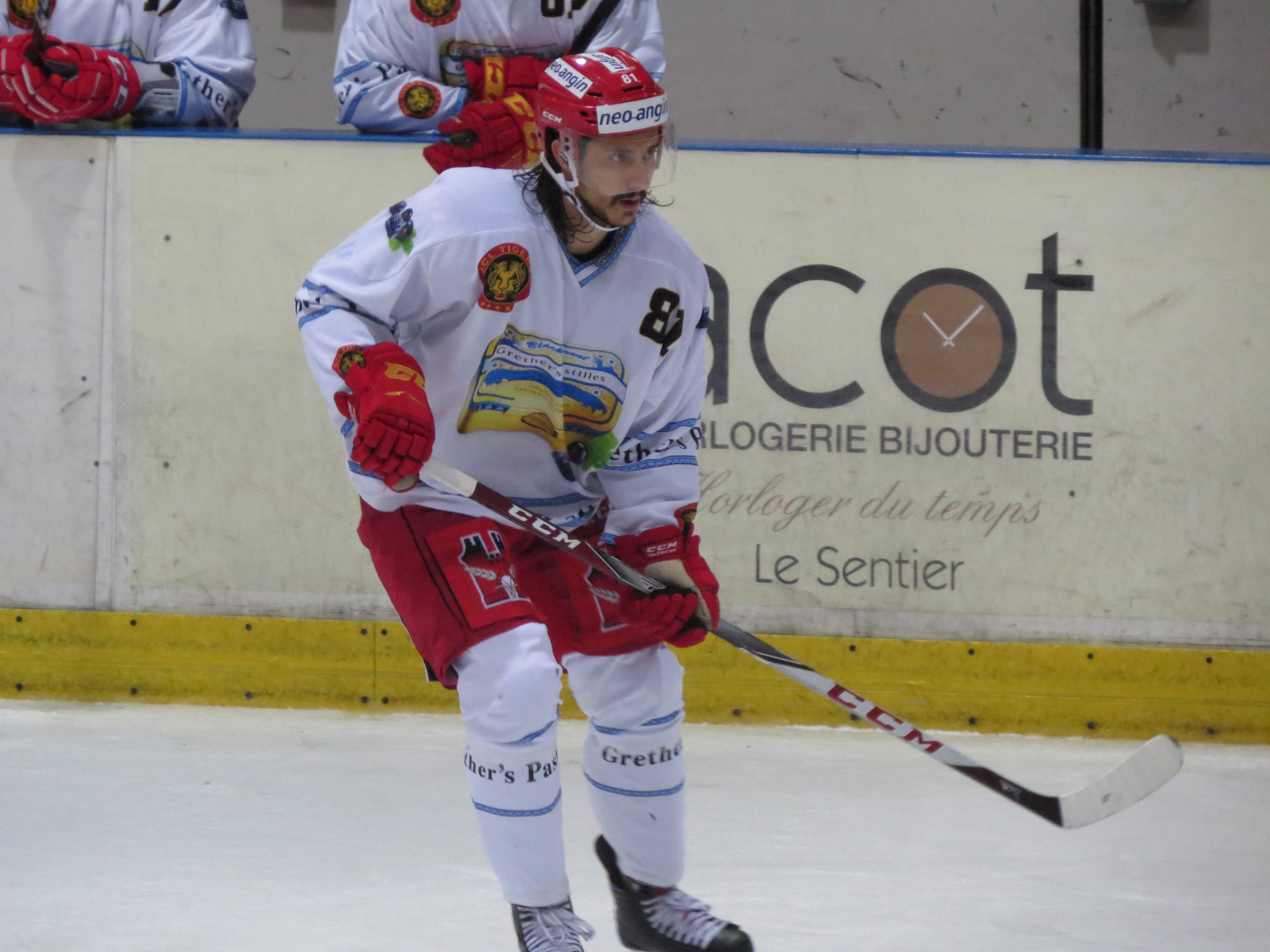
- Born: January 23, 1985 (age 41) Bern, Switzerland
- Height: 6 ft 1 in (185 cm)
- Weight: 198 lb (90 kg; 14 st 2 lb)
- Position: Defense
- Shot: Left
- SL team (P) Cur. team Former teams: EHC Kloten; SC Langenthal (SL); SC Bern; HPK; HC Fribourg-Gottéron; EHC Biel; Lausanne HC; SCL Tigers
- NHL draft: 100th overall, 2003; Ottawa Senators
- Playing career: 2003–2020

Philippe Seydoux (born 23 January 1985), known artistically as FEEL, is a Swiss artist and former professional ice hockey player.

== Art career ==
His practice combines painting, poetry and multisensory exhibition environments. His work addresses love, acceptance, equality and emotional recovery, drawing on his experience of illness and the transition from competitive sport to artistic expression.

Seydoux’s interest in art preceded his artistic career. As a child, he accompanied his parents to museums and theatres. Following injuries and prolonged health difficulties, he withdrew from professional hockey and developed a self-taught painting practice. A gift of spray paints from a friend encouraged him to begin experimenting. His Bern home subsequently became his studio. His sporting background also informed his methods: he adapted hockey sticks into painting tools by attaching brushes to their ends.

He began making art in 2020 and exhibiting in 2022. His exhibition history includes In the Clouds (2022), Night or Day, Afloat, As a Dove and Mirroring (2023), Peace (2024), and Making Room (2026). Presented across Switzerland, these projects explore recurring ideas of femininity, belonging, reflection and acceptance.

Painting and language are closely connected in FEEL’s work. Cloud imagery and heart-like forms recur alongside handwritten English poems, individual words and altered phrases. Seydoux adds, crosses out, mirrors or deliberately misspells words to introduce different readings and angles of perception. His palette includes pastel tones and saturated colours, with pink occupying a particularly prominent place. The paintings frequently evoke rose-coloured skies. According to Seydoux, his early paintings were darker and more explicitly marked by pain; their colours became lighter as his practice developed.

His materials include spray paint, acrylic paint and oil pastels, alongside Himalayan salt and copper. Seydoux incorporates these mineral and metal elements for their intended energetic and symbolic qualities, drawing on their use in certain complementary therapies and wellness practices and connecting them with themes of self-love and healing.

FEEL approaches exhibitions as environments engaging several senses. His experiences with colour, sound and scent during recovery informed this approach, which he describes through the term “healist”, combining healer and artist. Press coverage describes presentations integrating paintings, written messages, lighting, fragrances and taste, intended to create welcoming spaces for reflection and relief from everyday pressures. Healing is understood here as the artist’s personal experience and an aim of the exhibition.

The recurring FEEL symbol is associated with Seydoux’s poem #Eternal Love. The poem gives the emblem several overlapping identities, including a cloud, candle, flower, crown, wings and dove. It explicitly connects the symbol with acceptance and equality. These associations bring together the artist’s imagery of flight, tenderness and belonging within a single visual motif. For Seydoux, the symbol represents an energy that can be felt, given or carried when love is present.

Women’s rights and gender equality form part of this concern with care and human relationships. BärnerBär’s 2023 profile identified these subjects in Seydoux’s work and reported plans to donate part of the proceeds from his Fernweh Bar exhibition to women’s shelters. According to Seydoux, this commitment extends to all his exhibitions. In the artist’s presentation of fo(u)r, attention to women’s dignity and equal rights belongs to the exhibition’s broader message of love and responsibility towards others.

== Playing career ==
Born in Bern, Switzerland, Seydoux played junior with SC Bern from 2000 until 2003. His play attracted the attention of the NHL's Ottawa Senators, who drafted him in the third round (100th overall) in the 2003 NHL entry draft. He then moved to EHC Kloten where he played with the Kloten junior team as well as part-time with the professional team. He became a full-time member of the professional team in 2004. In 2006, he moved to HC Fribourg-Gottéron and in 2009 he moved to EHC Biel.

On 29 July 2019, with one-year remaining on his contract in his second stint with EHC Kloten, Seydoux was loaned to fellow league competitors and former club, SC Langenthal, for the duration of the 2019–20 season.

== Career statistics ==
=== Regular season and playoffs ===
			Regular season					Playoffs
Season	Team	League	GP	G	A	Pts	PIM	GP	G	A	Pts	PIM
2000–01	SC Bern	SUI U20	30	1	3	4	8	4	1	2	3	6
2001–02	SC Bern	SUI U20	35	6	17	23	94	7	3	5	8	24
2001–02	SC Bern	NLA	8	0	0	0	0	2	0	0	0	0
2002–03	SC Bern	SUI U20	5	0	4	4	12	—	—	—	—	—
2002–03	Kloten Flyers	SUI U20	14	2	10	12	50	1	0	0	0	4
2002–03	Kloten Flyers	NLA	15	0	1	1	4	5	0	0	0	6
2002–03	EHC Bülach	SUI.3	8	0	3	3	38	—	—	—	—	—
2003–04	Kloten Flyers	NLA	24	2	3	5	20	—	—	—	—	—
2004–05	Kloten Flyers	NLA	28	1	8	9	22	—	—	—	—	—
2004–05	Kloten Flyers	NLA	44	1	7	8	48	11	0	0	0	4
2006–07	HPK	SM-l	6	0	0	0	4	—	—	—	—	—
2006–07	EHC Kloten	NLA	7	0	2	2	4	—	—	—	—	—
2006–07	HC Fribourg–Gottéron	NLA	21	2	7	9	38	—	—	—	—	—
2007–08	HC Fribourg–Gottéron	NLA	40	5	8	13	46	11	1	3	4	4
2008–09	HC Fribourg–Gottéron	NLA	30	4	2	6	38	11	1	0	1	16
2009–10	EHC Biel	NLA	23	0	8	8	14	—	—	—	—	—
2010–11	EHC Biel	NLA	42	2	6	8	79	—	—	—	—	—
2011–12	Ontario Reign	ECHL	4	0	3	3	6	—	—	—	—	—
2012–13	Lausanne HC	SUI.2	7	0	2	2	2	18	0	6	6	32
2013–14	Lausanne HC	NLA	25	0	5	5	18	6	0	0	0	2
2014–15	Lausanne HC	NLA	19	0	0	0	6	—	—	—	—	—
2014–15	SC Langenthal	SUI.2	5	1	5	6	0	—	—	—	—	—
2015–16	SC Langenthal	SUI.2	35	7	25	32	88	6	2	0	2	8
2016–17	SCL Tigers	NLA	48	3	6	9	32	—	—	—	—	—
2017–18	SCL Tigers	NL	37	1	4	5	26	—	—	—	—	—
2018–19	EHC Kloten	SUI.2	33	3	6	9	20	1	0	0	0	0
2019–20	SC Langenthal	SUI.2	3	0	0	0	2	—	—	—	—	—
NL totals			411	21	67	88	385	46	2	3	5	32

=== International ===
Year	Team	Event	GP	G	A	Pts	PIM
2003	Switzerland	WJC18	5	0	1	1	68
2004	Switzerland	WJC	6	1	1	2	4
Junior totals			11	1	2	3	72
