= Jeff Paul =

Canadian ice hockey player

- Born: March 1, 1978 (age 47) London, Ontario, Canada
- Height: 6 ft 3 in (191 cm)
- Weight: 222 lb (101 kg; 15 st 12 lb)
- Position: Defence
- Shot: Right
- Played for: Colorado Avalanche
- NHL draft: 42nd overall, 1996; Chicago Blackhawks
- Playing career: 1998–2009

Jeffrey M. Paul (born March 1, 1978) is a Canadian former professional ice hockey player and current coach of the Kladno Knights of the Czech Republic Extraliga. He played in 10 professional seasons.

== Career ==
Born in London, Ontario, Paul was drafted to the National Hockey League in 1996 by the Chicago Blackhawks in the 2nd round, 42nd overall. He played two games in the NHL for the Colorado Avalanche during the 2002–03 season. On September 1, 2005, Paul was signed as a free agent by the Montreal Canadiens. Paul last played professionally for SHC Fassa in Italy's Serie A.

He served as a one-time assistant coach of the London Knights of the Ontario Hockey League during the 2012–13 season.

== Career statistics ==
=== Regular season and playoffs ===
			Regular season					Playoffs
Season	Team	League	GP	G	A	Pts	PIM	GP	G	A	Pts	PIM
1994–95	Niagara Falls Thunder	OHL	57	3	10	13	64	6	0	2	2	0
1995–96	Niagara Falls Thunder	OHL	48	1	7	8	81	10	0	4	4	37
1996–97	Erie Otters	OHL	60	4	23	27	152	5	2	0	2	12
1997–98	Erie Otters	OHL	48	3	17	20	108	7	0	2	2	13
1998–99	Portland Pirates	AHL	6	0	0	0	4	—	—	—	—	—
1998–99	Indianapolis Ice	IHL	55	0	7	7	120	7	0	2	2	12
1999–00	Cleveland Lumberjacks	IHL	69	6	6	12	210	9	1	0	1	12
2000–01	Norfolk Admirals	AHL	59	5	6	11	171	9	0	2	2	12
2001–02	Hershey Bears	AHL	58	1	13	14	201	7	0	1	1	6
2002–03	Hershey Bears	AHL	50	2	3	5	123	—	—	—	—	—
2002–03	Colorado Avalanche	NHL	2	0	0	0	7	—	—	—	—	—
2003–04	San Antonio Rampage	AHL	57	2	6	8	174	—	—	—	—	—
2003–04	Hartford Wolf Pack	AHL	17	0	5	5	38	15	1	2	3	31
2004–05	Portland Pirates	AHL	54	1	2	3	137	—	—	—	—	—
2005–06	Hamilton Bulldogs	AHL	27	0	4	4	68	—	—	—	—	—
2006–07	Tilburg Trappers	NED	33	14	18	32	176	—	—	—	—	—
2007–08	EV Duisburg	DEL	53	1	5	6	86	—	—	—	—	—
2008–09	SHC Fassa	ITA	44	4	11	15	88	—	—	—	—	—
AHL totals			328	11	39	50	916	31	1	5	6	49
NHL totals			2	0	0	0	7	—	—	—	—	—
