= Grant McNeill =

Canadian ice hockey player

- Born: May 3, 1983 (age 43) Vermilion, Alberta, Canada
- Height: 6 ft 2 in (188 cm)
- Weight: 220 lb (100 kg; 15 st 10 lb)
- Position: Defence
- Shot: Left
- Played for: Florida Panthers
- NHL draft: 68th overall, 2001; Florida Panthers
- Playing career: 2003–2010

Grant McNeill (born June 8, 1983) is a Canadian former professional ice hockey defenceman. He was drafted 68th overall in the 2001 NHL entry draft by the Florida Panthers and played three games with the Panthers in the National Hockey League in the 2003–04 season. He currently plays with the Edmonton Bolts of the AMHL DIV 3. He last played with the South Carolina Stingrays of the ECHL on contract from the Hershey Bears of the American Hockey League.

== Career statistics ==
			Regular season					Playoffs
Season	Team	League	GP	G	A	Pts	PIM	GP	G	A	Pts	PIM
1999–2000	Prince Albert Raiders	WHL	58	1	1	2	43	6	0	1	1	0
2000–01	Prince Albert Raiders	WHL	61	2	6	8	280	—	—	—	—	—
2001–02	Prince Albert Raiders	WHL	70	7	6	13	326	—	—	—	—	—
2002–03	Prince Albert Raiders	WHL	71	1	8	9	280	—	—	—	—	—
2003–04	San Antonio Rampage	AHL	33	0	0	0	110	—	—	—	—	—
2003–04	Florida Panthers	NHL	3	0	0	0	5	—	—	—	—	—
2004–05	San Antonio Rampage	AHL	40	0	2	2	231	—	—	—	—	—
2004–05	Texas Wildcatters	ECHL	24	0	3	3	111	—	—	—	—	—
2005–06	Florida Everblades	ECHL	31	1	1	2	123	—	—	—	—	—
2005–06	Rochester Americans	AHL	2	0	0	0	0	—	—	—	—	—
2006–07	Wheeling Nailers	ECHL	63	3	4	7	254	—	—	—	—	—
2006–07	Wilkes–Barre/Scranton Penguins	AHL	2	0	0	0	2	—	—	—	—	—
2007–08	Hershey Bears	AHL	12	1	0	1	65	—	—	—	—	—
2007–08	South Carolina Stingrays	ECHL	57	4	7	11	213	9	0	1	1	17
2008–09	Hershey Bears	AHL	25	3	0	3	137	1	1	0	1	0
2009–10	Hershey Bears	AHL	35	1	3	4	124	—	—	—	—	—
2010–11	Hershey Bears	AHL	15	0	0	0	39	—	—	—	—	—
2010–11	South Carolina Stingrays	ECHL	36	1	6	7	94	2	0	0	0	0
2015–16	Stony Plain Eagles	ChHL	1	0	0	0	12	4	0	1	1	20
AHL totals			164	5	5	10	708	1	1	0	1	0
NHL totals			3	0	0	0	5	—	—	—	—	—
ECHL totals			211	9	21	30	795	11	0	1	1	7
