= Kyle Rossiter =

Canadian ice hockey player

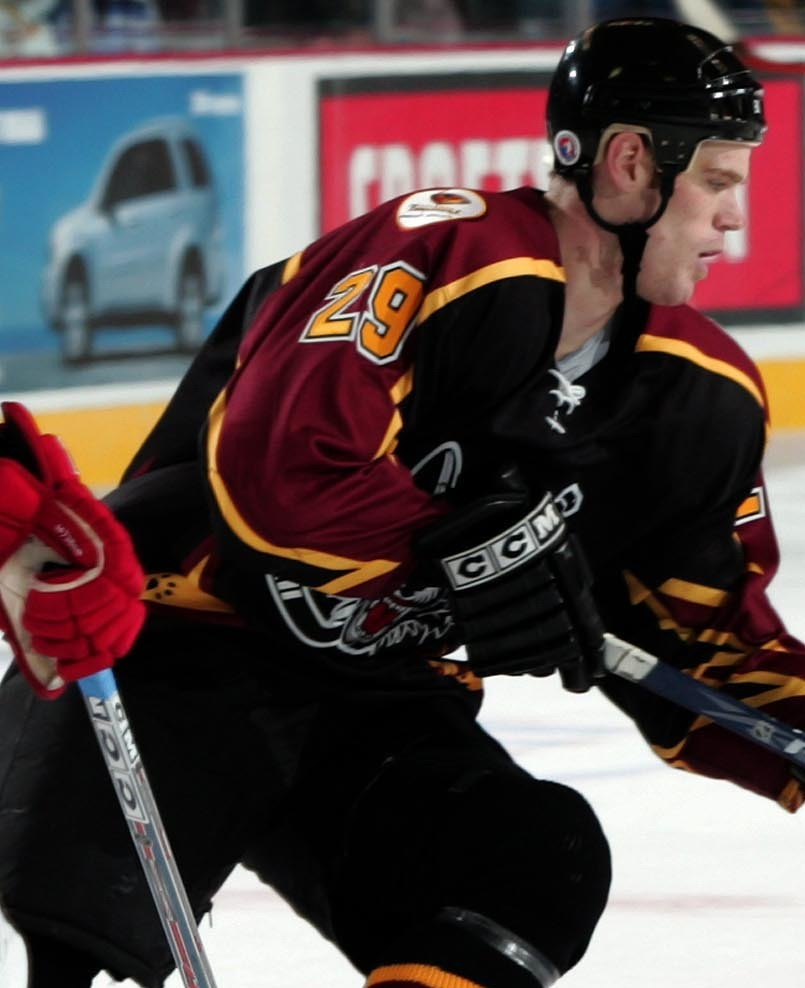
- Rossiter with the Chicago Wolves in 2004
- Born: June 9, 1980 (age 45) Edmonton, Alberta, Canada
- Height: 6 ft 4 in (193 cm)
- Weight: 225 lb (102 kg; 16 st 1 lb)
- Position: Defence
- Shot: Left
- Played for: Florida Panthers; Atlanta Thrashers; KalPa; Asiago HC
- NHL draft: 30th overall, 1998; Florida Panthers
- Playing career: 2000–2006

Kyle Rossiter (born June 9, 1980) is a Canadian former professional ice hockey defenceman who played in the National Hockey League for the Florida Panthers and the Atlanta Thrashers.

== Playing career ==
Rossiter began has career with the Spokane Chiefs of the Western Hockey League and was later drafted 30th overall by the Panthers in the 1998 NHL entry draft. He spent most of his career in AHL affiliates and managed to play 11 regular season games (9 with Florida and 2 with Atlanta) scoring 1 assist and collecting 11 penalty minutes. In 2005, Rossiter moved to Europe, playing in Finland's SM-liiga for KalPa and briefly in Italy for Asiago HC.

== Personal ==
The oldest of 5 children, Rossiter has three sisters and a brother. Rossiter is now a Real Estate Agent in Edmonton. Since his retirement he has played senior hockey in the Chinook Hockey League with the Stony Plain Eagles.

== Career statistics ==
=== Regular season and playoffs ===
			Regular season					Playoffs
Season	Team	League	GP	G	A	Pts	PIM	GP	G	A	Pts	PIM
1996–97	Spokane Chiefs	WHL	50	0	2	2	65	9	0	0	0	6
1997–98	Spokane Chiefs	WHL	61	6	16	22	190	15	0	3	3	28
1998–99	Spokane Chiefs	WHL	71	4	17	21	206	—	—	—	—	—
1999–00	Spokane Chiefs	WHL	63	11	22	33	155	15	1	4	5	25
2000–01	Louisville Panthers	AHL	78	2	5	7	110	—	—	—	—	—
2001–02	Utah Grizzlies	AHL	74	3	7	10	88	5	0	1	1	0
2001–02	Florida Panthers	NHL	2	0	0	0	2	—	—	—	—	—
2002–03	San Antonio Rampage	AHL	67	0	7	7	107	3	0	0	0	0
2002–03	Florida Panthers	NHL	3	0	0	0	0	—	—	—	—	—
2003–04	San Antonio Rampage	AHL	51	5	7	12	70	—	—	—	—	—
2003–04	Florida Panthers	NHL	4	0	0	0	7	—	—	—	—	—
2003–04	Chicago Wolves	AHL	12	0	1	1	25	6	0	0	0	19
2003–04	Atlanta Thrashers	NHL	2	0	1	1	0	—	—	—	—	—
2004–05	Chicago Wolves	AHL	33	1	5	6	43	—	—	—	—	—
2004–05	Wilkes-Barre/Scranton Penguins	AHL	9	0	1	1	5	1	0	0	0	0
2005–06	KalPa	SM-l	35	1	6	7	187	—	—	—	—	—
2005–06	Asiago HC	ITL	8	0	0	0	18	6	0	1	1	20
2007–08	Stony Plain Eagles	ChHL	19	3	20	23	52	—	—	—	—	—
2008–09	Stony Plain Eagles	ChHL	23	6	17	23	46	—	—	—	—	—
2009–10	Stony Plain Eagles	ChHL	19	1	17	18	44	—	—	—	—	—
2010–11	Stony Plain Eagles	ChHL	20	6	11	17	34	—	—	—	—	—
2011–12	Stony Plain Eagles	ChHL	19	3	18	21	33	—	—	—	—	—
2012–13	Stony Plain Eagles	ChHL	12	0	3	3	12	3	1	1	2	6
2014–15	Stony Plain Eagles	ChHL	1	0	1	1	0	2	0	0	0	2
NHL totals			11	0	1	1	9	—	—	—	—	—

Medal record

Representing Canada

Ice hockey

World Junior Championships
Bronze medal – third place	2000 Umeå	

=== International ===
Year	Team	Event	Result	GP	G	A	Pts	PIM
2000	Canada	WJC	3rd place, bronze medalist(s)	7	0	0	0	20
Junior totals				7	0	0	0	20
