= Serge Payer =

Canadian professional ice hockey player (born 1979)

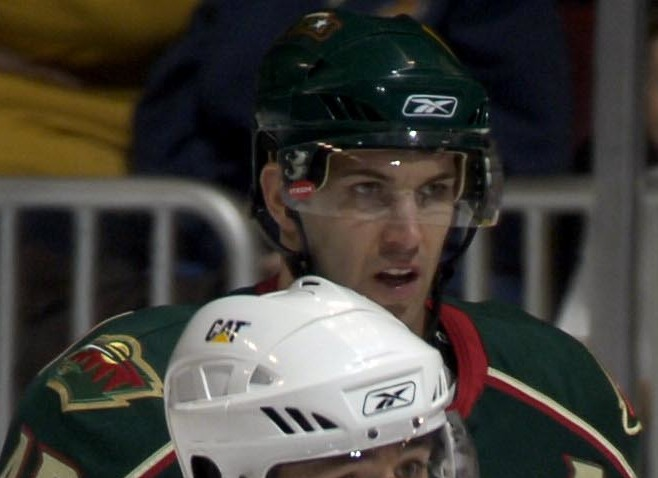
- Payer with the Houston Aeros in 2007
- Born: May 7, 1979 (age 46); Rockland, Ontario, Canada
- Height: 6 ft 0 in (183 cm)
- Weight: 191 lb (87 kg; 13 st 9 lb)
- Position: Centre
- Shot: Left
- Played for: Florida Panthers; Ottawa Senators; Krefeld Pinguine; Vålerenga
- NHL draft: Undrafted
- Playing career: 2000–2011

Serge Payer (born May 7, 1979) is a Canadian professional ice hockey player. Payer retired at the end of the 2011 season, where he played with Vålerenga Ishockey of the GET-ligaen. Payer played 119 career NHL games with the Florida Panthers and Ottawa Senators, scoring 7 goals and 6 assists for 13 points.

== Playing career ==
Payer was signed as an undrafted free agent by the Florida Panthers on 30 September 1997.

In 1999, Payer's career nearly came to an end when he was diagnosed with Guillain–Barré syndrome while playing junior hockey for the Kitchener Rangers. After a 10-month battle with the disease and a subsequent bout with mononucleosis, he returned to the Rangers before eventually making his NHL debut on November 13, 2000, against the Atlanta Thrashers. He scored his first NHL goal in a game against the Ottawa Senators at the Corel Centre (now: Canadian Tire Centre) in front of family and friends. He has started a foundation to raise money for Guillain–Barré syndrome research and to promote public awareness of the disease. He holds a boat cruise once a year in Ottawa, in his name, with close friends, family, and the public.

Payer signed as a free agent with the Minnesota Wild on August 20, 2007, but was not able to crack their NHL roster.

After playing two seasons for German team Krefeld Pinguine of the Deutsche Eishockey Liga, he signed a contract with Norwegian team Vålerenga of the GET-ligaen on 5 January 2011.

Serge has now retired from pro hockey and works as an agent and advisor for elite hockey talent through his company, Unlimited Sports Management.

== Career statistics ==
			Regular season					Playoffs
Season	Team	League	GP	G	A	Pts	PIM	GP	G	A	Pts	PIM
1995–96	Kitchener Rangers	OHL	66	8	16	24	18	12	0	2	2	2
1996–97	Kitchener Rangers	OHL	63	7	16	23	27	13	1	3	4	2
1997–98	Kitchener Rangers	OHL	44	20	21	41	51	6	3	0	3	7
1998–99	Kitchener Rangers	OHL	40	18	19	37	22	—	—	—	—	—
1999–00	Kitchener Rangers	OHL	44	10	26	36	53	5	0	3	3	6
2000–01	Louisville Panthers	AHL	32	6	6	12	15	—	—	—	—	—
2000–01	Florida Panthers	NHL	43	5	1	6	21	—	—	—	—	—
2001–02	Utah Grizzlies	AHL	20	6	2	8	9	—	—	—	—	—
2002–03	San Antonio Rampage	AHL	78	10	31	41	30	1	0	0	0	2
2003–04	Binghamton Senators	AHL	67	14	20	34	91	2	0	0	0	0
2003–04	Ottawa Senators	NHL	5	0	1	1	2	—	—	—	—	—
2004–05	San Antonio Rampage	AHL	3	1	1	2	4	—	—	—	—	—
2005–06	Florida Panthers	NHL	71	2	4	6	26	—	—	—	—	—
2006–07	Binghamton Senators	AHL	43	6	12	18	31	—	—	—	—	—
2006–07	Ottawa Senators	NHL	5	0	0	0	0	—	—	—	—	—
2007–08	Houston Aeros	AHL	66	11	20	31	57	5	0	1	1	4
2008–09	Krefeld Pinguine	DEL	44	8	18	26	40	7	1	6	7	2
2009–10	Krefeld Pinguine	DEL	34	0	8	8	20	—	—	—	—	—
2010–11	Vålerenga	GET	14	2	6	8	10	5	1	1	2	18
NHL totals			124	7	6	13	49	—	—	—	—	—
