= 2003–04 Washington Capitals season =

NHL hockey team season

2003–04 Washington Capitals
- Division: 5th Southeast
- Conference: 14th Eastern
- 2003–04 record: 23–46–10–3
- Home record: 13–20–6–2
- Road record: 10–26–4–1
- Goals for: 186
- Goals against: 253

Team information
- General manager: George McPhee
- Coach: Bruce Cassidy (Oct.–Dec.); Glen Hanlon (Dec.–Apr.)
- Captain: Steve Konowalchuk (Oct.); Vacant (Oct.–Apr.)
- Alternate captains: Peter Bondra (Oct.–Feb.); Jeff Halpern (Feb.–Apr.); Jaromir Jagr (Oct.–Jan.); Brendan Witt
- Arena: MCI Center
- Average attendance: 14,720
- Minor league affiliate: Portland Pirates

Team leaders
- Goals: Robert Lang (29)
- Assists: Robert Lang (45)
- Points: Robert Lang (74)
- Penalty minutes: Darcy Verot (135)
- Plus/minus: Robert Lang (+2)
- Wins: Olaf Kolzig (19)
- Goals against average: Olaf Kolzig (2.89)

The 2003–04 Washington Capitals season was the Capitals's 30th season of play. The team finished in fifth and last-place in the Southeast Division, and fourteenth overall in the Eastern Conference, to miss the playoffs for the first time since the 2001–02 season.

== Regular season ==
On December 10, 2003, head coach Bruce Cassidy was fired after a disappointing 8–18–1–1 start to the season. Assistant coach Glen Hanlon was named his replacement.

The Capitals were the most penalized team in the League, with 401 power-play opportunities against. They also scored the fewest short-handed goals in the League, with just 4.

=== Final standings ===
Southeast Division
| No. | CR | | GP | W | L | T | OTL | GF | GA | PTS |
|---|---|---|---|---|---|---|---|---|---|---|
| 1 | 1 | **Tampa Bay Lightning** | 82 | 46 | 22 | 8 | 6 | 245 | 192 | 106 |
| 2 | 10 | Atlanta Thrashers | 82 | 33 | 37 | 8 | 4 | 214 | 243 | 78 |
| 3 | 11 | Carolina Hurricanes | 82 | 28 | 34 | 14 | 6 | 172 | 209 | 76 |
| 4 | 12 | Florida Panthers | 82 | 28 | 35 | 15 | 4 | 188 | 221 | 75 |
| 5 | 14 | Washington Capitals | 82 | 23 | 46 | 10 | 3 | 186 | 253 | 59 |

Note: CR = Conference rank; GP = Games played; W = Wins; L = Losses; T = Ties; OTL = Overtime loss; GF = Goals for; GA = Goals against; Pts = Points
Bolded teams qualified for the playoffs.

Eastern Conference
| R | | Div | GP | W | L | T | OTL | GF | GA | Pts |
|---|---|---|---|---|---|---|---|---|---|---|
| **1** | **Z-** Tampa Bay Lightning | **SE** | **82** | **46** | **22** | **8** | **6** | **245** | **192** | 106 |
| **2** | **Y-** Boston Bruins | **NE** | **82** | **41** | **19** | **15** | **7** | **209** | **188** | 104 |
| **3** | **Y-** Philadelphia Flyers | **AT** | **82** | **40** | **21** | **15** | **6** | **209** | **188** | 101 |
| **4** | **X-** Toronto Maple Leafs | **NE** | **82** | **45** | **24** | **10** | **3** | **242** | **204** | 103 |
| **5** | **X-** Ottawa Senators | **NE** | **82** | **43** | **23** | **10** | **6** | **262** | **189** | 102 |
| **6** | **X-** New Jersey Devils | **AT** | **82** | **43** | **25** | **12** | **2** | **213** | **164** | 100 |
| **7** | **X-** Montreal Canadiens | **NE** | **82** | **41** | **30** | **7** | **4** | **208** | **192** | 93 |
| **8** | **X-** New York Islanders | **AT** | **82** | **38** | **29** | **11** | **4** | **237** | **210** | 91 |
8.5
| 9 | Buffalo Sabres | NE | 82 | 37 | 34 | 7 | 4 | 220 | 221 | 85 |
| 10 | Atlanta Thrashers | SE | 82 | 33 | 37 | 8 | 4 | 214 | 243 | 78 |
| 11 | Carolina Hurricanes | SE | 82 | 28 | 34 | 14 | 6 | 172 | 209 | 76 |
| 12 | Florida Panthers | SE | 82 | 28 | 35 | 15 | 4 | 188 | 221 | 75 |
| 13 | New York Rangers | AT | 82 | 27 | 40 | 7 | 8 | 206 | 250 | 69 |
| 14 | Washington Capitals | SE | 82 | 23 | 46 | 10 | 3 | 186 | 253 | 59 |
| 15 | Pittsburgh Penguins | AT | 82 | 23 | 47 | 8 | 4 | 190 | 303 | 58 |

Divisions: AT – Atlantic, NE – Northeast, SE – Southeast

Z – Clinched conference; Y – Clinched division; X – Clinched playoff spot

== Schedule and results ==
2003–04 regular season
October: 2–7–1–0 (home: 2–2–0–0; road: 0–5–1–0)

| Game | Date | Score | Opponent | Record | Recap |
|---|---|---|---|---|---|
| 1 | October 9, 2003 | 6–1 | New York Islanders (2003–04) | 1–0–0–0 | W |
| 2 | October 11, 2003 | 3–4 | Atlanta Thrashers (2003–04) | 1–1–0–0 | L |
| 3 | October 13, 2003 | 2–2 OT | @ Toronto Maple Leafs (2003–04) | 1–1–1–0 | T |
| 4 | October 14, 2003 | 1–5 | @ Montreal Canadiens (2003–04) | 1–2–1–0 | L |
| 5 | October 17, 2003 | 2–4 | @ Dallas Stars (2003–04) | 1–3–1–0 | L |
| 6 | October 18, 2003 | 1–4 | @ St. Louis Blues (2003–04) | 1–4–1–0 | L |
| 7 | October 23, 2003 | 1–5 | @ Ottawa Senators (2003–04) | 1–5–1–0 | L |
| 8 | October 25, 2003 | 1–4 | @ Toronto Maple Leafs (2003–04) | 1–6–1–0 | L |
| 9 | October 29, 2003 | 2–4 | Mighty Ducks of Anaheim (2003–04) | 1–7–1–0 | L |
| 10 | October 31, 2003 | 2–1 | Atlanta Thrashers (2003–04) | 2–7–1–0 | W |

November: 5–8–0–1 (home: 1–4–0–1; road: 4–4–0–0)

| Game | Date | Score | Opponent | Record | Recap |
|---|---|---|---|---|---|
| 11 | November 1, 2003 | 1–2 | @ Minnesota Wild (2003–04) | 2–8–1–0 | L |
| 12 | November 4, 2003 | 5–1 | @ Tampa Bay Lightning (2003–04) | 3–8–1–0 | W |
| 13 | November 6, 2003 | 2–4 | @ Philadelphia Flyers (2003–04) | 3–9–1–0 | L |
| 14 | November 8, 2003 | 2–3 | San Jose Sharks (2003–04) | 3–10–1–0 | L |
| 15 | November 10, 2003 | 2–3 | Los Angeles Kings (2003–04) | 3–11–1–0 | L |
| 16 | November 12, 2003 | 7–1 | Carolina Hurricanes (2003–04) | 4–11–1–0 | W |
| 17 | November 14, 2003 | 2–5 | Tampa Bay Lightning (2003–04) | 4–12–1–0 | L |
| 18 | November 15, 2003 | 2–1 | @ Carolina Hurricanes (2003–04) | 5–12–1–0 | W |
| 19 | November 20, 2003 | 2–3 | @ Boston Bruins (2003–04) | 5–13–1–0 | L |
| 20 | November 22, 2003 | 2–3 OT | Florida Panthers (2003–04) | 5–13–1–1 | OTL |
| 21 | November 24, 2003 | 4–1 | @ Detroit Red Wings (2003–04) | 6–13–1–1 | W |
| 22 | November 26, 2003 | 2–5 | @ Buffalo Sabres (2003–04) | 6–14–1–1 | L |
| 23 | November 28, 2003 | 3–5 | Montreal Canadiens (2003–04) | 6–15–1–1 | L |
| 24 | November 29, 2003 | 5–3 | @ Columbus Blue Jackets (2003–04) | 7–15–1–1 | W |

December: 4–8–2–0 (home: 2–4–1–0; road: 2–4–1–0)

| Game | Date | Score | Opponent | Record | Recap |
|---|---|---|---|---|---|
| 25 | December 2, 2003 | 4–1 | @ New York Islanders (2003–04) | 8–15–1–1 | W |
| 26 | December 4, 2003 | 0–3 | @ New Jersey Devils (2003–04) | 8–16–1–1 | L |
| 27 | December 6, 2003 | 3–7 | @ Los Angeles Kings (2003–04) | 8–17–1–1 | L |
| 28 | December 8, 2003 | 1–4 | @ Colorado Avalanche (2003–04) | 8–18–1–1 | L |
| 29 | December 11, 2003 | 6–5 | Boston Bruins (2003–04) | 9–18–1–1 | W |
| 30 | December 13, 2003 | 1–5 | Detroit Red Wings (2003–04) | 9–19–1–1 | L |
| 31 | December 16, 2003 | 5–0 | @ Atlanta Thrashers (2003–04) | 10–19–1–1 | W |
| 32 | December 17, 2003 | 2–2 OT | @ Florida Panthers (2003–04) | 10–19–2–1 | T |
| 33 | December 19, 2003 | 2–2 OT | Toronto Maple Leafs (2003–04) | 10–19–3–1 | T |
| 34 | December 21, 2003 | 4–5 | New York Islanders (2003–04) | 10–20–3–1 | L |
| 35 | December 23, 2003 | 3–2 | Montreal Canadiens (2003–04) | 11–20–3–1 | W |
| 36 | December 27, 2003 | 1–3 | Buffalo Sabres (2003–04) | 11–21–3–1 | L |
| 37 | December 29, 2003 | 1–3 | Boston Bruins (2003–04) | 11–22–3–1 | L |
| 38 | December 31, 2003 | 1–7 | @ Buffalo Sabres (2003–04) | 11–23–3–1 | L |

January: 5–7–2–1 (home: 3–4–2–0; road: 2–3–0–1)

| Game | Date | Score | Opponent | Record | Recap |
|---|---|---|---|---|---|
| 39 | January 1, 2004 | 2–2 OT | New Jersey Devils (2003–04) | 11–23–4–1 | T |
| 40 | January 3, 2004 | 2–5 | @ Ottawa Senators (2003–04) | 11–24–4–1 | L |
| 41 | January 4, 2004 | 1–4 | @ Montreal Canadiens (2003–04) | 11–25–4–1 | L |
| 42 | January 7, 2004 | 0–3 | Phoenix Coyotes (2003–04) | 11–26–4–1 | L |
| 43 | January 9, 2004 | 4–1 | Carolina Hurricanes (2003–04) | 12–26–4–1 | W |
| 44 | January 11, 2004 | 1–0 | Edmonton Oilers (2003–04) | 13–26–4–1 | W |
| 45 | January 14, 2004 | 3–3 OT | Calgary Flames (2003–04) | 13–26–5–1 | T |
| 46 | January 17, 2004 | 1–2 OT | @ New Jersey Devils (2003–04) | 13–26–5–2 | OTL |
| 47 | January 18, 2004 | 4–3 | Pittsburgh Penguins (2003–04) | 14–26–5–2 | W |
| 48 | January 21, 2004 | 2–3 | Toronto Maple Leafs (2003–04) | 14–27–5–2 | L |
| 49 | January 23, 2004 | 1–4 | @ Florida Panthers (2003–04) | 14–28–5–2 | L |
| 50 | January 25, 2004 | 1–4 | Philadelphia Flyers (2003–04) | 14–29–5–2 | L |
| 51 | January 28, 2004 | 2–1 | @ New York Rangers (2003–04) | 15–29–5–2 | W |
| 52 | January 29, 2004 | 5–3 | @ Carolina Hurricanes (2003–04) | 16–29–5–2 | W |
| 53 | January 31, 2004 | 1–6 | Vancouver Canucks (2003–04) | 16–30–5–2 | L |

February: 4–5–3–0 (home: 2–2–2–0; road: 2–3–1–0)

| Game | Date | Score | Opponent | Record | Recap |
|---|---|---|---|---|---|
| 54 | February 3, 2004 | 2–1 | Tampa Bay Lightning (2003–04) | 17–30–5–2 | W |
| 55 | February 4, 2004 | 1–5 | @ Philadelphia Flyers (2003–04) | 17–31–5–2 | L |
| 56 | February 12, 2004 | 3–3 OT | @ Carolina Hurricanes (2003–04) | 17–31–6–2 | T |
| 57 | February 13, 2004 | 2–5 | @ Nashville Predators (2003–04) | 17–32–6–2 | L |
| 58 | February 15, 2004 | 4–0 | @ Chicago Blackhawks (2003–04) | 18–32–6–2 | W |
| 59 | February 17, 2004 | 1–1 OT | Ottawa Senators (2003–04) | 18–32–7–2 | T |
| 60 | February 19, 2004 | 3–1 | New Jersey Devils (2003–04) | 19–32–7–2 | W |
| 61 | February 21, 2004 | 2–2 OT | Florida Panthers (2003–04) | 19–32–8–2 | T |
| 62 | February 23, 2004 | 3–6 | Tampa Bay Lightning (2003–04) | 19–33–8–2 | L |
| 63 | February 25, 2004 | 1–2 | Carolina Hurricanes (2003–04) | 19–34–8–2 | L |
| 64 | February 27, 2004 | 4–1 | @ Florida Panthers (2003–04) | 20–34–8–2 | W |
| 65 | February 28, 2004 | 2–4 | @ Tampa Bay Lightning (2003–04) | 20–35–8–2 | L |

March: 3–10–1–0 (home: 3–4–1–0; road: 0–6–0–0)

| Game | Date | Score | Opponent | Record | Recap |
|---|---|---|---|---|---|
| 66 | March 2, 2004 | 0–1 | Florida Panthers (2003–04) | 20–36–8–2 | L |
| 67 | March 5, 2004 | 2–3 | @ New York Rangers (2003–04) | 20–37–8–2 | L |
| 68 | March 6, 2004 | 2–1 | Philadelphia Flyers (2003–04) | 21–37–8–2 | W |
| 69 | March 8, 2004 | 1–4 | Ottawa Senators (2003–04) | 21–38–8–2 | L |
| 70 | March 10, 2004 | 0–6 | Buffalo Sabres (2003–04) | 21–39–8–2 | L |
| 71 | March 12, 2004 | 3–4 | Chicago Blackhawks (2003–04) | 21–40–8–2 | L |
| 72 | March 13, 2004 | 2–5 | @ Atlanta Thrashers (2003–04) | 21–41–8–2 | L |
| 73 | March 16, 2004 | 1–4 | @ Pittsburgh Penguins (2003–04) | 21–42–8–2 | L |
| 74 | March 18, 2004 | 4–3 OT | New York Rangers (2003–04) | 22–42–8–2 | W |
| 75 | March 20, 2004 | 2–2 OT | Atlanta Thrashers (2003–04) | 22–42–9–2 | T |
| 76 | March 23, 2004 | 0–3 | @ New York Islanders (2003–04) | 22–43–9–2 | L |
| 77 | March 24, 2004 | 2–3 | @ Atlanta Thrashers (2003–04) | 22–44–9–2 | L |
| 78 | March 27, 2004 | 1–4 | @ Tampa Bay Lightning (2003–04) | 22–45–9–2 | L |
| 79 | March 30, 2004 | 4–2 | Pittsburgh Penguins (2003–04) | 23–45–9–2 | W |

April: 0–1–1–1 (home: 0–0–0–1; road: 0–1–1–0)

| Game | Date | Score | Opponent | Record | Recap |
|---|---|---|---|---|---|
| 80 | April 1, 2004 | 3–3 OT | @ Boston Bruins (2003–04) | 23–45–10–2 | T |
| 81 | April 3, 2004 | 2–3 OT | New York Rangers (2003–04) | 23–45–10–3 | OTL |
| 82 | April 4, 2004 | 3–4 | @ Pittsburgh Penguins (2003–04) | 23–46–10–3 | L |

Legend: W Win (2 points) L Loss (0 points) T Tie (1 point) OTL Overtime loss (1 point)

== Player statistics ==
=== Scoring ===
- Position abbreviations: C = Center; D = Defense; G = Goaltender; LW = Left wing; RW = Right wing
- † = Joined team via a transaction (e.g., trade, waivers, signing) during the season. Stats reflect time with the Capitals only.
- ‡ = Left team via a transaction (e.g., trade, waivers, release) during the season. Stats reflect time with the Capitals only.

| No. | Player | Pos | Regular season | | | | | |
| No. | Player | Pos | GP | G | A | Pts | +/- | PIM |
|---|---|---|---|---|---|---|---|---|
| 20 | Robert Lang‡ | C | 63 | 29 | 45 | 74 | 2 | 24 |
| 55 | Sergei Gonchar‡ | D | 56 | 7 | 42 | 49 | −20 | 44 |
| 11 | Jeff Halpern | C | 79 | 19 | 27 | 46 | −21 | 56 |
| 68 | Jaromir Jagr‡ | RW | 46 | 16 | 29 | 45 | −4 | 26 |
| 12 | Peter Bondra‡ | RW | 54 | 21 | 14 | 35 | −17 | 22 |
| 14 | Kip Miller | C | 66 | 9 | 22 | 31 | −10 | 8 |
| 9 | Dainius Zubrus | C | 54 | 12 | 15 | 27 | −16 | 38 |
| 28 | Alexander Semin | LW | 52 | 10 | 12 | 22 | −2 | 36 |
| 25 | Mike Grier‡ | RW | 68 | 8 | 12 | 20 | −19 | 32 |
| 24 | Brian Willsie | RW | 49 | 10 | 5 | 15 | −7 | 18 |
| 2 | Josef Boumedienne | D | 37 | 2 | 12 | 14 | −10 | 30 |
| 18 | Matt Pettinger | LW | 71 | 7 | 5 | 12 | −9 | 37 |
| 29 | Joel Kwiatkowski | D | 80 | 6 | 6 | 12 | −28 | 89 |
| 19 | Brendan Witt | D | 72 | 2 | 10 | 12 | −22 | 123 |
| 23 | Trent Whitfield | C | 44 | 6 | 5 | 11 | −2 | 14 |
| 3 | Jason Doig | D | 65 | 2 | 9 | 11 | −12 | 105 |
| 22 | Anson Carter†‡ | RW | 19 | 5 | 5 | 10 | 2 | 6 |
| 13 | Bates Battaglia† | LW | 66 | 4 | 6 | 10 | −23 | 38 |
| 15 | Boyd Gordon | C | 41 | 1 | 5 | 6 | −9 | 8 |
| 4 | Rick Berry | D | 65 | 0 | 6 | 6 | −5 | 108 |
| 27 | Craig Johnson† | LW | 15 | 0 | 6 | 6 | −6 | 8 |
| 51 | Stephen Peat | RW | 64 | 5 | 0 | 5 | −10 | 90 |
| 8 | Steve Eminger | D | 41 | 0 | 4 | 4 | −11 | 45 |
| 38 | Todd Rohloff† | D | 35 | 0 | 3 | 3 | −5 | 18 |
| 16 | Brian Sutherby | C | 30 | 2 | 0 | 2 | −5 | 28 |
| 27 | Ivan Ciernik | RW | 7 | 1 | 1 | 2 | 1 | 0 |
| 92 | Michael Nylander‡ | C | 3 | 0 | 2 | 2 | 1 | 8 |
| 76 | Darcy Verot | LW | 37 | 0 | 2 | 2 | −6 | 135 |
| 34 | Jean-Luc Grand-Pierre† | D | 13 | 1 | 0 | 1 | −2 | 14 |
| 17 | John Gruden | D | 11 | 1 | 0 | 1 | −1 | 6 |
| 63 | Owen Fussey | RW | 4 | 0 | 1 | 1 | −1 | 0 |
| 37 | Olaf Kolzig | G | 63 | 0 | 1 | 1 | | 6 |
| 22 | Steve Konowalchuk‡ | LW | 6 | 0 | 1 | 1 | −5 | 0 |
| 21 | Brooks Laich† | C | 4 | 0 | 1 | 1 | −1 | 0 |
| 41 | Brad Norton† | D | 16 | 0 | 1 | 1 | −4 | 17 |
| 33 | Maxime Ouellet | G | 6 | 0 | 1 | 1 | | 0 |
| 64 | Roman Tvrdon | C | 9 | 0 | 1 | 1 | −3 | 2 |
| 49 | Dwayne Zinger | D | 7 | 0 | 1 | 1 | 2 | 9 |
| 69 | Mel Angelstad† | LW | 2 | 0 | 0 | 0 | 0 | 2 |
| 35 | Sebastien Charpentier | G | 7 | 0 | 0 | 0 | | 0 |
| 36 | Jakub Cutta | D | 3 | 0 | 0 | 0 | −1 | 0 |
| 36 | Colin Forbes† | C | 2 | 0 | 0 | 0 | 0 | 0 |
| 58 | Jean-Francois Fortin | D | 2 | 0 | 0 | 0 | 0 | 0 |
| 75 | Chris Hajt | D | 5 | 0 | 0 | 0 | 0 | 2 |
| 39 | Graham Mink | C | 2 | 0 | 0 | 0 | −1 | 2 |
| 26 | Shaone Morrisonn† | D | 3 | 0 | 0 | 0 | 0 | 0 |
| 65 | Andrej Podkonicky | C | 2 | 0 | 0 | 0 | −1 | 0 |
| 1 | Rastislav Stana | G | 6 | 0 | 0 | 0 | | 0 |
| 56 | Garret Stroshein | RW | 3 | 0 | 0 | 0 | −1 | 14 |
| 31 | Matthew Yeats† | G | 5 | 0 | 0 | 0 | | 2 |
| 40 | Nolan Yonkman | D | 1 | 0 | 0 | 0 | 0 | 0 |

=== Goaltending ===
- † = Joined team via a transaction (e.g., trade, waivers, signing) during the season. Stats reflect time with the Capitals only.

| No. | Player | Regular season | | | | | | | | | |
| No. | Player | GP | W | L | T | SA | GA | GAA | SV% | SO | TOI |
|---|---|---|---|---|---|---|---|---|---|---|---|
| 37 | Olaf Kolzig | 63 | 19 | 35 | 9 | 1958 | 180 | 2.89 | .908 | 2 | 3738 |
| 33 | Maxime Ouellet | 6 | 2 | 3 | 1 | 210 | 19 | 3.12 | .910 | 1 | 365 |
| 1 | Rastislav Stana | 6 | 1 | 2 | 0 | 100 | 11 | 3.13 | .890 | 0 | 211 |
| 31 | Matthew Yeats† | 5 | 1 | 3 | 0 | 141 | 13 | 3.02 | .908 | 0 | 258 |
| 35 | Sebastien Charpentier | 7 | 0 | 6 | 0 | 168 | 21 | 3.41 | .875 | 0 | 369 |

== Awards and records ==
=== Awards ===
| Type | Award/honor | Recipient | Ref |
|---|---|---|---|
| League (in-season) | NHL All-Star Game selection | Robert Lang | |
| League (in-season) | NHL Defensive Player of the Week | Olaf Kolzig (February 23) | |
| League (in-season) | NHL Offensive Player of the Month | Robert Lang (November) | |
| League (in-season) | NHL Offensive Player of the Week | Robert Lang (November 17) | |
| League (in-season) | NHL Offensive Player of the Week | Robert Lang (December 22) | |
| League (in-season) | NHL Offensive Player of the Week | Jeff Halpern (April 5) | |

=== Milestones ===
| Milestone | Player | Date | Ref |
|---|---|---|---|
| First game | Boyd Gordon | October 9, 2003 | |
| First game | Alexander Semin | October 14, 2003 | |
| First game | Rastislav Stana | November 14, 2003 | |
| First game | Dwayne Zinger | December 11, 2003 | |
| First game | Darcy Verot | January 1, 2004 | |
| First game | Graham Mink | February 3, 2004 | |
| First game | Owen Fussey | March 10, 2004 | |
| First game | Roman Tvrdon | March 18, 2004 | |
| First game | Matthew Yeats | March 23, 2004 | |
| First game | Garret Stroshein | April 1, 2004 | |
| First game | Mel Angelstad | April 3, 2004 | |
| 500th game played | Olaf Kolzig | November 22, 2003 | |

== Transactions ==
The Capitals were involved in the following transactions from June 10, 2003, the day after the deciding game of the 2003 Stanley Cup Finals, through June 7, 2004, the day of the deciding game of the 2004 Stanley Cup Finals.

=== Trades ===
| Date | Details | | Ref |
|---|---|---|---|
| June 22, 2003 | To Montreal Canadiens: 4th-round pick in 2003; 7th-round pick in 2003 | To Washington Capitals: Nashville’s 4th-round pick in 2003 | |
| June 22, 2003 | To Ottawa Senators: Future considerations (Note: Washington’s 9th-round pick in 2004) | To Washington Capitals: Washington’s 9th-round pick in 2003 | |
| June 30, 2003 | To Philadelphia Flyers: Conditional 7th-round pick in 2004 (Note: Condition not met.) | To Washington Capitals: Rights to Dmitri Yushkevich | |
| July 14, 2003 | To Nashville Predators: Mike Farrell | To Washington Capitals: Alexander Riazantsev | |
| October 5, 2003 | To Ottawa Senators: Denis Hamel | To Washington Capitals: Future considerations | |
| October 22, 2003 | To Colorado Avalanche: Steve Konowalchuk; 3rd-round pick in 2004 | To Washington Capitals: Bates Battaglia; Rights to Jonas Johansson | |
| January 23, 2004 | To New York Rangers: Jaromir Jagr | To Washington Capitals: Anson Carter | |
| February 18, 2004 | To Ottawa Senators: Peter Bondra | To Washington Capitals: Brooks Laich; 2nd-round pick in 2005 | |
| February 27, 2004 | To Detroit Red Wings: Robert Lang | To Washington Capitals: Tomas Fleischmann; 1st-round pick in 2004; 4th-round pick in 2006 | |
| March 3, 2004 | To Boston Bruins: Sergei Gonchar | To Washington Capitals: Shaone Morrisonn; 1st-round pick in 2004; 2nd-round pick in 2004 | |
| March 4, 2004 | To Boston Bruins: Michael Nylander | To Washington Capitals: 2nd-round pick in 2006; Future considerations (Note: 4th-round pick in 2005) | |
| March 8, 2004 | To Los Angeles Kings: Anson Carter | To Washington Capitals: Jared Aulin | |
| March 9, 2004 | To Buffalo Sabres: Mike Grier | To Washington Capitals: Rights to Jakub Klepis | |

=== Players acquired ===
| Date | Player | Former team | Term | Via | Ref |
|---|---|---|---|---|---|
| July 14, 2003 | Andrej Podkonicky | Iserlohn Roosters (DEL) | 1-year | Free agency | |
| July 14, 2003 | Garret Stroshein | Portland Pirates (AHL) | 2-year | Free agency | |
| July 18, 2003 | John Gruden | Eisbaren Berlin (DEL) | 1-year | Free agency | |
| August 18, 2003 | Francois Methot | Buffalo Sabres | 1-year | Free agency | |
| September 5, 2003 | Darcy Verot | Calgary Flames | 1-year | Free agency | |
| October 3, 2003 | Denis Hamel | Ottawa Senators | | Waiver draft | |
| October 3, 2003 | Brian Willsie | Colorado Avalanche | | Waiver draft | |
| November 4, 2003 | Colin Forbes | Portland Pirates (AHL) | | Free agency | |
| January 9, 2004 | Todd Rohloff | Columbus Blue Jackets | | Waivers | |
| March 4, 2004 | Brad Norton | Los Angeles Kings | | Waivers | |
| March 5, 2004 | Craig Johnson | Toronto Maple Leafs | | Waivers | |
| March 9, 2004 | Jean-Luc Grand-Pierre | Atlanta Thrashers | | Waivers | |
| March 9, 2004 | Bill Lindsay | Atlanta Thrashers | | Waivers (Note: Claim rescinded due to the severity of the throat injury Lindsay suffered during a January 3 game.) | |
| March 19, 2004 | Matthew Yeats | Portland Pirates (AHL) | | Free agency | |
| April 3, 2004 | Mel Angelstad | Portland Pirates (AHL) | | Free agency | |
| April 26, 2004 | Justin Eddy | Quinnipiac University (AHA) | | Free agency | |

=== Players lost ===
| Date | Player | New team | Via (Note: In parentheses is the player's free agency group on July 1 if applicable.) | Ref |
|---|---|---|---|---|
| July 1, 2003 | Krys Barch (Note: Barch was inactive during the 2003–04 season.) | | Contract expiration (UFA) | |
| July 1, 2003 | Nathan Forster (Note: Forster was inactive during the 2003–04 season.) | | Contract expiration (UFA) | |
| July 17, 2003 | Chris Ferraro | Phoenix Coyotes | Free agency (VI) | |
| July 17, 2003 | Peter Ferraro | Phoenix Coyotes | Free agency (UFA) | |
| July 17, 2003 | Josh Green | Calgary Flames | Free agency (UFA) | |
| July 24, 2003 | Mark Murphy | Philadelphia Flyers | Free agency (VI) | |
| August 7, 2003 | Calle Johansson | | Retirement (III) (Note: Johansson came out of retirement to sign with the Toronto Maple Leafs on March 9, 2004.) | |
| August 7, 2003 | Andreas Salomonsson | Modo Hockey (SHL) | Free agency (II) (Note: Washington retained Salomonsson’s NHL rights through the 2005–06 season.) | |
| September 5, 2003 | Todd Rohloff | Columbus Blue Jackets | Free agency (VI) | |
| September 27, 2003 | Ken Klee | Toronto Maple Leafs | Free agency (III) | |
| N/A | Ryan VanBuskirk | Lowell Lock Monsters (AHL) | Free agency (UFA) | |
| October 3, 2003 | Glen Metropolit | Ottawa Senators | Waiver draft | |
| October 9, 2003 | Alex Henry | Minnesota Wild | Waivers | |
| October 14, 2003 | Colin Forbes | Portland Pirates (AHL) | Free agency (UFA) | |
| November 11, 2003 | Dmitri Yushkevich | Lokomotiv Yaroslavl (RSL) | Free agency (III) | |
| December 11, 2003 | Sergei Berezin | HC CSKA Moscow (RSL) | Free agency (III) | |
| May 2, 2004 | Andrej Podkonicky | HC Liberec (ELH) | Free agency | |
| May 26, 2004 | Rastislav Stana | Sodertalje SK (SHL) | Free agency (Note: Washington retained Stana’s NHL rights through the 2007–08 season.) | |

=== Signings ===
| Date | Player | Term | Contract type | Ref |
|---|---|---|---|---|
| June 26, 2003 | Peter Bondra | 1-year | Option exercised | |
| June 26, 2003 | Jeff Halpern | 1-year | Option exercised | |
| July 3, 2003 | Boyd Gordon | 3-year | Entry-level | |
| July 3, 2003 | Petr Sykora | 1-year (Note: Club option for a second year.) | Re-signing | |
| July 15, 2003 | Jean-Francois Fortin | 1-year | Re-signing | |
| July 15, 2003 | Chris Hajt | 1-year | Re-signing | |
| July 16, 2003 | Alexander Semin | 3-year | Entry-level | |
| July 17, 2003 | Jason Doig | 1-year | Re-signing | |
| July 21, 2003 | Trent Whitfield | 1-year | Re-signing | |
| July 22, 2003 | Stephen Peat | 1-year | Re-signing | |
| July 24, 2003 | Mike Grier | 1-year | Re-signing | |
| July 25, 2003 | Rick Berry | 1-year | Re-signing | |
| July 28, 2003 | Matt Pettinger | 1-year | Re-signing | |
| July 31, 2003 | Alex Henry | 1-year | Re-signing | |
| August 10, 2003 | Michael Nylander | 1-year | Re-signing | |
| August 19, 2003 | Rastislav Stana | 1-year | Re-signing | |
| September 5, 2003 | Ivan Ciernik | 1-year | Re-signing | |
| September 11, 2003 | Joel Kwiatkowski | 1-year | Re-signing | |
| May 27, 2004 | Maxime Daigneault | 3-year | Entry-level | |
| June 1, 2004 | Tomas Fleischmann | 3-year | Entry-level | |
| June 1, 2004 | Jonas Johansson | 3-year | Entry-level | |

== Draft picks ==
Washington's draft picks at the 2003 NHL entry draft held at the Gaylord Entertainment Center in Nashville, Tennessee.

| Round | # | Player | Nationality | College/Junior/Club team (League) |
|---|---|---|---|---|
| 1 | 18 | Eric Fehr | Canada | Brandon Wheat Kings (WHL) |
| 3 | 83 | Stephen Werner | United States | University of Massachusetts (NCAA) |
| 4 | 109 | Andreas Valdix | Sweden | Malmo Redhawks (Sweden) |
| 5 | 155 | Josh Robertson | United States | Proctor High School (USHS-MN) |
| 8 | 249 | Andrew Joudrey | Canada | Notre Dame Hounds (SJHL) |
| 9 | 279 | Mark Olafson | Canada | Kelowna Rockets (WHL) |

== Farm teams ==
The Capitals main American Hockey League affiliate was the Portland Pirates. Though they had no direct ECHL affiliate, players were sent from time to time between the Dayton Bombers and Reading Royals.

== See also ==
- 2003–04 NHL season
