= Stephen Peat =

Canadian ice hockey player (1980–2024)

- A photo of Peat from his Facebook profile
- Born: March 10, 1980 Princeton, British Columbia, Canada
- Died: September 11, 2024 (aged 44) New Westminster, British Columbia, Canada
- Height: 6 ft 2 in (188 cm)
- Weight: 235 lb (107 kg; 16 st 11 lb)
- Position: Right wing
- Shot: Right
- Played for: Washington Capitals
- NHL draft: 32nd overall, 1998; Mighty Ducks of Anaheim
- Playing career: 2000–2007

Stephen Boyd Peat (March 10, 1980 – September 11, 2024) was a Canadian professional ice hockey right winger. Between 2001 and 2005, he played four seasons with the Washington Capitals of the National Hockey League (NHL). The Mighty Ducks of Anaheim picked him 32nd overall in the 1998 NHL entry draft.

Peat began his junior ice hockey career with the Red Deer Rebels of the Western Hockey League (WHL), who selected him third overall in the 1995 draft. He played for the Rebels, Tri-City Americans, and Calgary Hitmen before starting his professional hockey career in 2000 with the Portland Pirates. An enforcer, he was a physical presence for the Capitals and Pirates. He was traded to the Carolina Hurricanes in 2005 and spent his remaining career in the American Hockey League before retiring in 2007.

Peat experienced substance use disorder, post-concussion syndrome and homelessness after his retirement and was convicted of arson in 2015. In 2024, he died after being struck by a vehicle.

== Early life ==
Peat was born March 10, 1980, in Princeton, British Columbia. When he was 14 years old, he moved to Langley, British Columbia, to try out for the Langley Thunder of the British Columbia Hockey League (BCJHL).

== Playing career ==
The Red Deer Rebels of the Western Hockey League (WHL) selected Peat third overall in the 1995 WHL Bantam Draft. He made his junior ice hockey debut on December 27 before returning to Langley to play in the BCJHL. He joined the Rebels in full for the 1996–97 season at the age of 16. In his rookie season, he recorded three goals and 17 points while serving 161 penalty minutes. Nagging injuries during the 1997–98 season included a broken middle finger on his right hand from a preseason fight and two to his left hand and knee. That season, he was named to the CHL/NHL Top Prospects Game.

While he was originally projected as a top ten National Hockey League (NHL) draft pick, Peat's regression during his sophomore season caused his prospects to drop. The Mighty Ducks of Anaheim selected him in the second round, 32nd overall, of the 1998 NHL entry draft.

After attending camp with the Ducks, Peat returned to the Rebels for the 1998–99 season, whereupon he was named one of four rotating assistant captains. In 31 games for the Rebels that season, he had two goals, eight points, and 488 penalty minutes. After failing to live up to expectations in Red Deer, the Rebels traded him to the Tri-City Americans in January, receiving defenceman Regan Darby and winger Jarrett Thompson in exchange. He played five games for Tri-City, going pointless. A strained abdominal muscle sidelined him for the remainder of the season, and he made his return that November.

Peat played 12 games with the Americans during the 1999–00 season, with two assists and 48 penalty minutes, before he was traded to the Calgary Hitmen in December. He missed more time that season with a stab wound, hip injury, and WHL suspensions. In June 2000, the Mighty Ducks traded him to the Washington Capitals in exchange for a fourth-round pick in the 2000 NHL entry draft, and he signed with the organization shortly thereafter.

Peat joined the Portland Pirates, Washington's American Hockey League (AHL) affiliate, for the 2000–01 season. With a reputation as an enforcer, he was seen as a good fit for a team looking to increase their physical presence. After aggravating an old groin injury during training camp, he underwent surgery to add surgical mesh to the area.

Peat made his NHL debut on October 8, 2001, playing 3 minutes and 54 seconds in the Capitals' 4–0 loss to the Boston Bruins. Because the Capitals lacked an enforcer, he was called up for games where they anticipated facing a physical opponent, while spending the rest of his time in Portland, where he would receive more ice time. He did not spend a full season in Washington until 2003–04, when he recorded a career-high five goals in 64 games.

During the 2004–05 NHL lockout, Peat was one of many NHL players to sign with another league. Although he had offers from European teams, he elected to play with the Danbury Trashers of the United Hockey League, who played a more similar game to the NHL. After four seasons with the Capitals, during which he had eight goals, two assists, and 234 penalty minutes in 130 games, he was traded to the Carolina Hurricanes on December 28, 2005. In exchange, Washington received forward Colin Forbes. He was assigned to the Lowell Lock Monsters and played three games there before sustaining season-ending groin and abdominal injuries. He never played for the Hurricanes: injuries to his groin and hand kept him in the AHL until his retirement in 2007.

Peat's last professional hockey appearance was one game with the Albany River Rats, the New Jersey Devils' AHL affiliate, during the 2006–07 season.

== Legal issues ==
On February 3, 2000, Peat was stabbed in the abdomen with a hunting knife at the Outlaws Nightclub in Calgary. He was injured while trying to prevent an altercation between his teammate and a group of strangers. He was released from Foothills Medical Centre the next morning and a man was charged with assault with a deadly weapon and three counts of being unlawfully at large.

On March 17, 2015, Peat set down a blowtorch in his father's garage, which burned a hole in a nearby mattress, creating a fire that destroyed the house. Originally charged with arson with disregard for human life and arson causing property damage, he ultimately pleaded guilty to arson by negligence. He was sentenced to one year of probation.

== Later life and death ==
After his retirement from hockey, Peat developed a substance use disorder, self-medicating with prescription painkillers, cocaine, and alcohol. He had been prescribed Percocet throughout his playing career and continued to use prescription painkillers to manage chronic headaches.

Peat's relationship with his father Walter deteriorated after the arson conviction, culminating in a no-contact order. By 2017, he was homeless and estranged from his family, finding transient housing around Surrey, British Columbia. He continued to experience headaches, memory loss, and impaired focus, which he attributed to brain injuries received during his career as an enforcer.

Around 4:15 a.m. (PDT) on the morning of August 30, 2024, Peat was struck by a car while crossing the street on foot in Langley. He died about two weeks later, on September 11, at the age of 44 at a hospital in New Westminster, British Columbia.

== Career statistics ==
			Regular season					Playoffs
Season	Team	League	GP	G	A	Pts	PIM	GP	G	A	Pts	PIM
1994–95	Port Coquitlam Buckaroos	PIJHL	11	1	0	1	23	—	—	—	—	—
1994–95	Langley Thunder	BCJHL	13	0	1	1	23	—	—	—	—	—
1995–96	Red Deer Rebels	WHL	1	0	0	0	0	—	—	—	—	—
1995–96	Langley Thunder	BCJHL	59	5	15	20	112	—	—	—	—	—
1996–97	Red Deer Rebels	WHL	68	3	14	17	161	16	0	2	2	22
1997–98	Red Deer Rebels	WHL	63	6	12	18	189	5	0	0	0	8
1998–99	Red Deer Rebels	WHL	31	2	6	8	98	—	—	—	—	—
1998–99	Tri-City Americans	WHL	5	0	0	0	19	—	—	—	—	—
1999–00	Tri-City Americans	WHL	12	0	2	2	48	—	—	—	—	—
1999–00	Calgary Hitmen	WHL	23	0	8	8	100	13	0	1	1	33
2000–01	Portland Pirates	AHL	6	0	0	0	16	—	—	—	—	—
2001–02	Washington Capitals	NHL	38	2	2	4	85	—	—	—	—	—
2001–02	Portland Pirates	AHL	17	2	2	4	57	—	—	—	—	—
2002–03	Washington Capitals	NHL	27	1	0	1	57	—	—	—	—	—
2002–03	Portland Pirates	AHL	18	0	0	0	52	—	—	—	—	—
2003–04	Washington Capitals	NHL	64	5	0	5	90	—	—	—	—	—
2004–05	Danbury Thrashers	UHL	7	0	1	1	45	—	—	—	—	—
2005–06	Washington Capitals	NHL	1	0	0	0	2	—	—	—	—	—
2005–06	Hershey Bears	AHL	5	0	1	1	7	—	—	—	—	—
2005–06	Lowell Lock Monsters	AHL	3	1	1	2	23	—	—	—	—	—
2006–07	Albany River Rats	AHL	1	0	0	0	0	—	—	—	—	—
NHL totals			130	8	2	10	234	—	—	—	—	—
