= Andrew Desjardins =

Canadian ice hockey player (born 1986)

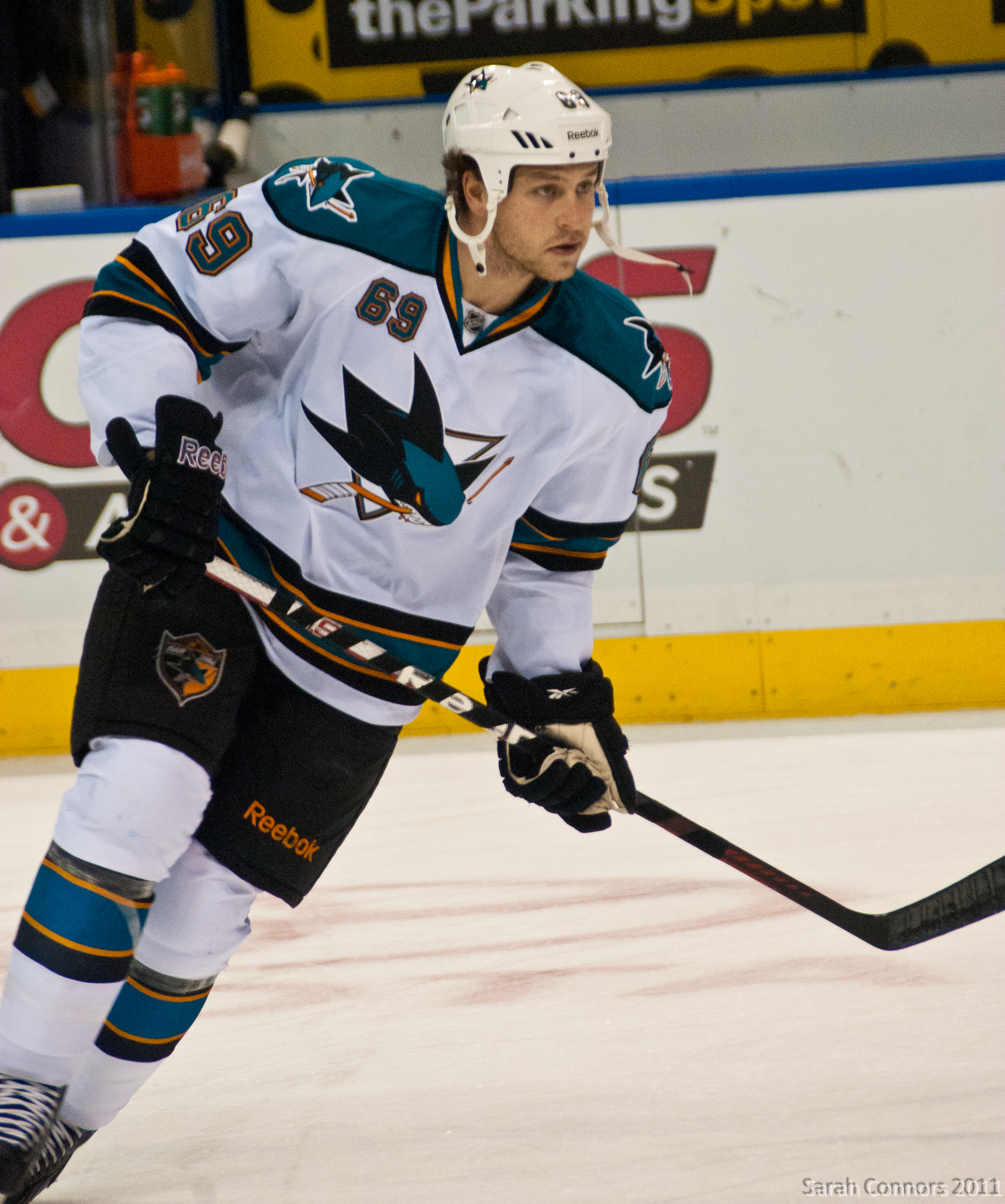
- Desjardins with the San Jose Sharks in December 2011
- Born: July 27, 1986 (age 40) Lively, Ontario, Canada
- Height: 6 ft 0 in (183 cm)
- Weight: 196 lb (89 kg; 14 st 0 lb)
- Position: Centre
- Shot: Left
- Played for: San Jose Sharks; Chicago Blackhawks; Adler Mannheim; EC VSV
- NHL draft: Undrafted
- Playing career: 2007–2024

Andrew Desjardins (born July 27, 1986) is a Canadian former professional ice hockey centre who played for the Chicago Blackhawks and the San Jose Sharks of the NHL.

Desjardins won the Stanley Cup with the Chicago Blackhawks in 2015. He is also notable for being one of only two players in NHL history to have worn the number 69, with the other being Mel Angelstad.

== Playing career ==
=== Amateur ===
Desjardins grew up in Lively, Ontario, a small town located 20 km from the city of Sudbury. He played his minor hockey in his home town and eventually for the nearby Onaping Falls Huskies AAA until the bantam level in the 2001–02 season. After that year, he was selected in the 15th round, 295th overall, of the Ontario Hockey League (OHL)'s 2002 Priority Selection by the Sault Ste. Marie Greyhounds. He spent the following 2002–03 season playing for the Rayside-Balfour SabreCats Midget AAA of the Great North Midget League and also saw some time with the Espanola Screaming Eagles of the NOJHL before making the Greyhounds roster the following year.

Desjardins played four seasons (2003 to 2007) of junior hockey in the OHL with Sault Ste. Marie.

=== Professional ===
Despite being undrafted to the NHL, Desjardins turned professional for the 2007–08 season, suiting up for 64 regular season and 11 playoff games for the Laredo Bucks of the Central Hockey League (CHL). The following season, 2008–09, he played five games in the ECHL with the Phoenix RoadRunners and 74 regular season and 12 playoff games in the American Hockey League (AHL) with the Worcester Sharks. In the 2009–10 season, he played the entire year with Worcester.

On June 26, 2010, the NHL's San Jose Sharks, the parent team of the Worcester Sharks, signed Desjardins as a free agent. He originally wore number 69 with the Sharks, becoming the second player in NHL history behind Mel Angelstad to wear the number in a regular season game, though he later switched to number 10 following the departure of Christian Ehrhoff.

On March 2, 2015, Desjardins was traded to the Chicago Blackhawks in exchange for winger Ben Smith. Desjardins switched his jersey number to 11 upon arrival with Chicago, as 10 was currently in use by Patrick Sharp. He would win the Stanley Cup with the Blackhawks the same season. Desjardins signed a two-year contract worth $1.6 million on July 3 to stay with Chicago. According to his agent, "[Desjardins] loved his time there," and "took less to stay."

At the conclusion of his contract, Desjardins was not re-signed by the Blackhawks and became an unrestricted free agent. On September 13, 2017, it was announced Desjardins would attend the New York Rangers' training camp on a professional tryout agreement (PTO). Desjardins was suspended two preseason games for an illegal check to the head of New Jersey Devils' forward Miles Wood. On October 10, Desjardins was released by the Rangers and signed a deal with German DEL side Adler Mannheim for the 2017–18 season on October 12.

Desjardins would play five seasons with Mannheim before playing two more season with EC VSV of the ICEHL. He retired on July 10, 2024 to accept an assistant coaching job with the Sudbury Wolves.

== Career statistics ==
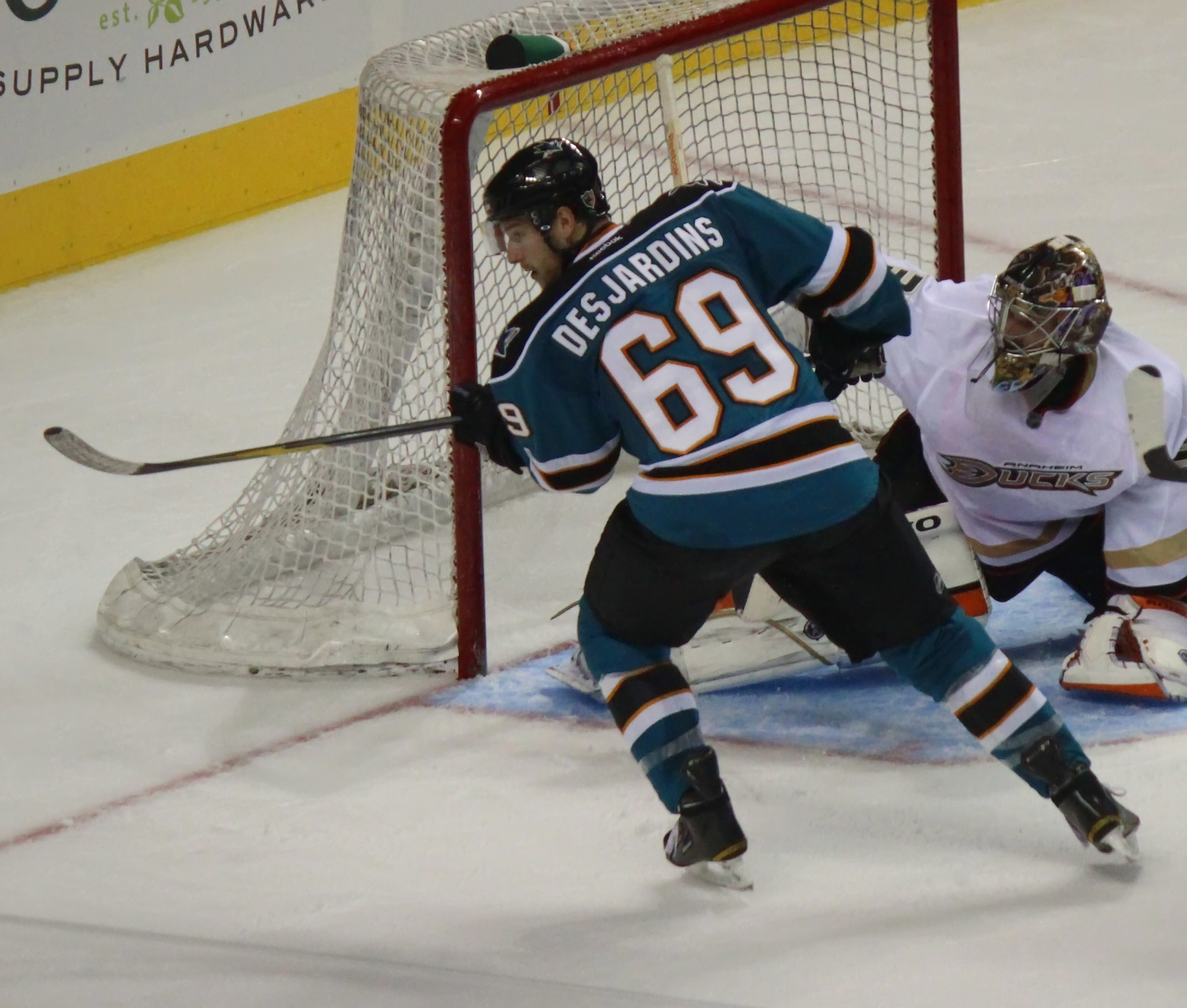
Desjardins during his tenure with the Sharks.

			Regular season					Playoffs
Season	Team	League	GP	G	A	Pts	PIM	GP	G	A	Pts	PIM
2001–02	Onaping Falls Huskies U15 AAA	NOHL U15	32	10	18	28	85	—	—	—	—	—
2001–02	Rayside-Balfour Sabrecats U18 AAA	GNML	—	—	—	—	—	1	0	1	1	—
2002–03	Rayside-Balfour Sabrecats U18 AAA	GNML	36	21	35	56	151	3	1	2	3	20
2002–03	Espanola Screaming Eagles	NOJHL	8	1	4	5	14	—	—	—	—	—
2003–04	Sault Ste. Marie Greyhounds	OHL	55	3	6	9	41	—	—	—	—	—
2004–05	Sault Ste. Marie Greyhounds	OHL	68	17	17	34	48	7	0	0	0	2
2005–06	Sault Ste. Marie Greyhounds	OHL	66	12	16	28	78	4	2	5	7	18
2006–07	Sault Ste. Marie Greyhounds	OHL	65	16	26	42	96	13	2	5	7	18
2007–08	Laredo Bucks	CHL	64	22	37	59	112	11	2	4	6	21
2008–09	Phoenix RoadRunners	ECHL	5	2	0	2	6	—	—	—	—	—
2008–09	Worcester Sharks	AHL	74	8	14	22	99	12	4	2	6	13
2009–10	Worcester Sharks	AHL	80	19	27	46	126	11	2	2	4	32
2010–11	Worcester Sharks	AHL	58	12	17	29	69	—	—	—	—	—
2010–11	San Jose Sharks	NHL	17	1	2	3	4	3	1	0	1	4
2011–12	San Jose Sharks	NHL	76	4	13	17	47	5	1	0	1	2
2012–13	San Jose Sharks	NHL	42	2	1	3	61	11	0	0	0	6
2013–14	San Jose Sharks	NHL	81	3	14	17	86	7	0	2	2	31
2014–15	San Jose Sharks	NHL	56	5	3	8	50	—	—	—	—	—
2014–15	Chicago Blackhawks	NHL	13	0	2	2	7	21	1	3	4	4
2015–16	Chicago Blackhawks	NHL	77	8	5	13	30	6	0	0	0	0
2016–17	Chicago Blackhawks	NHL	46	0	1	1	22	—	—	—	—	—
2017–18	Adler Mannheim	DEL	31	13	13	26	14	10	0	2	2	6
2018–19	Adler Mannheim	DEL	51	15	28	43	22	13	9	5	14	14
2019–20	Adler Mannheim	DEL	50	18	26	44	36	—	—	—	—	—
2020–21	Adler Mannheim	DEL	8	0	2	2	10	6	1	1	2	4
2021–22	Adler Mannheim	DEL	45	8	14	22	37	9	1	3	4	2
2022–23	EC VSV	ICEHL	47	12	16	28	49	5	2	0	2	25
2023–24	EC VSV	ICEHL	47	13	24	37	51	3	1	1	2	25
NHL totals			408	23	41	64	307	53	3	5	8	47
DEL totals			185	54	83	137	119	38	11	11	22	26

== Awards and honours ==
Award	Year
NHL
Stanley Cup (Chicago Blackhawks)	2015
DEL
Champion (Adler Mannheim)	2019
