= Garret Stroshein =

Canadian ice hockey player

- Born: April 4, 1980 (age 46) Edmonton, Alberta, Canada
- Height: 6 ft 7 in (201 cm)
- Weight: 245 lb (111 kg; 17 st 7 lb)
- Position: Right wing
- Shot: Right
- Played for: Washington Capitals
- NHL draft: Undrafted
- Playing career: 2000–2006

William Garrett Stroshein (born April 4, 1980) is a Canadian former professional ice hockey forward who primarily played as an Enforcer. He played in three games in the National Hockey League for the Washington Capitals during the 2003–04 NHL season.

== Career statistics ==
			Regular season					Playoffs
Season	Team	League	GP	G	A	Pts	PIM	GP	G	A	Pts	PIM
1998–99	Seattle Thunderbirds	WHL	11	0	0	0	32	4	0	0	0	7
1998–99	Fort McMurray Oil Barons	AJHL	29	0	1	1	215	—	—	—	—	—
1999–00	Chilliwack Chiefs	BCHL	58	3	1	4	176	—	—	—	—	—
2000–01	Chilliwack Chiefs	BCHL	55	7	8	15	187	5	0	0	0	8
2000–01	San Diego Gulls	WCHL	3	0	0	0	5	—	—	—	—	—
2001–02	Mobile Mysticks	ECHL	3	0	0	0	13	—	—	—	—	—
2001–02	San Diego Gulls	WCHL	24	0	0	0	90	—	—	—	—	—
2001–02	Fresno Falcons	WCHL	20	1	0	1	67	—	—	—	—	—
2001–02	Bakersfield Condors	WCHL	—	—	—	—	—	4	0	0	0	2
2002–03	Richmond Renegades	ECHL	2	0	0	0	7	—	—	—	—	—
2002–03	Portland Pirates	AHL	28	0	1	1	86	2	0	0	0	6
2003–04	Washington Capitals	NHL	3	0	0	0	14	—	—	—	—	—
2003–04	Portland Pirates	AHL	35	1	1	2	73	—	—	—	—	—
2004–05	Portland Pirates	AHL	42	0	1	1	109	—	—	—	—	—
2004–05	South Carolina Stingrays	ECHL	1	0	0	0	5	—	—	—	—	—
2005–06	Providence Bruins	AHL	48	1	4	5	129	—	—	—	—	—
2005–06	Trenton Titans	ECHL	8	1	1	2	23	1	0	0	0	0
NHL totals			3	0	0	0	14	—	—	—	—	—
AHL totals			153	2	7	9	397	2	0	0	0	6
