= Mel Angelstad =

Canadian ice hockey player (born 1971)

- Born: October 31, 1971 (age 54) Saskatoon, Saskatchewan, Canada
- Height: 6 ft 3 in (191 cm)
- Weight: 209 lb (95 kg; 14 st 13 lb)
- Position: Left Wing
- Shot: Left
- Played for: Washington Capitals
- NHL draft: Undrafted
- Playing career: 1992–2006

Melvin Angelstad (born October 31, 1971) is a Canadian former professional ice hockey player. He played two games in the National Hockey League with the Washington Capitals during the 2003–04 NHL season to become the first player to wear #69 in a regular season game. Andrew Desjardins later joined him in this distinction, who donned the number while skating for the San Jose Sharks.

For Angelstad, the road to the NHL was a long one. He played five Colonial Hockey League seasons in Thunder Bay before becoming an IHL regular and then AHL regular.

While in Thunder Bay he played for the Thunder Bay Thunder Hawks (later the Senators and Thunder Cats), wearing number 27, and spawning several bootlegged video collections of his fights.

During the 2003–04 NHL season Angelstad appeared in two games with the Washington Capitals, registering a total of zero points and two penalty minutes. Angelstad has the distinction of being the first player in NHL history to wear sweater #69 in a regular season game.

He now works as a firefighter in the Fort McMurray, Alberta area. He made a cameo appearance in the film Goon: Last of the Enforcers, in which he fights main character Doug Glatt (portrayed by Seann William Scott).

== Career statistics ==
			Regular season					Playoffs
Season	Team	League	GP	G	A	Pts	PIM	GP	G	A	Pts	PIM
1988–89	Allan Legionnaires	MAHA	35	15	23	38	256	—	—	—	—	—
1989–90	Warman Valley Crusaders	MJHL	38	1	5	6	411	—	—	—	—	—
1990–91	Flin Flon Bombers	SJHL	62	6	11	17	463	—	—	—	—	—
1991–92	Dauphin Kings	MJHL	44	8	29	37	296	—	—	—	—	—
1992–93	Thunder Bay Thunder Cats	CoHL	45	2	5	7	256	5	0	0	0	10
1992–93	Nashville Knights	ECHL	1	0	0	0	14	—	—	—	—	—
1993–94	Thunder Bay Senators	CoHL	58	1	20	21	374	9	1	2	3	65
1993–94	Prince Edward Island Senators	AHL	1	0	0	0	5	—	—	—	—	—
1994–95	Thunder Bay Senators	CoHL	46	0	8	8	317	7	0	3	3	62
1994–95	Prince Edward Island Senators	AHL	3	0	0	0	16	—	—	—	—	—
1995–96	Thunder Bay Senators	CoHL	51	3	3	6	335	16	0	6	6	94
1995–96	Phoenix Roadrunners	IHL	5	0	0	0	43	—	—	—	—	—
1996–97	Thunder Bay Thunder Cats	CoHL	66	10	21	31	422	7	0	1	1	21
1997–98	Fort Worth Brahmas	WPHL	19	1	6	7	102	—	—	—	—	—
1997–98	Las Vegas Thunder	IHL	3	0	0	0	5	—	—	—	—	—
1997–98	Orlando Solar Bears	IHL	63	1	3	4	321	8	0	0	0	29
1998–99	Michigan K-Wings	IHL	78	3	5	8	421	5	1	0	1	16
1999–00	Michigan K-Wings	IHL	33	3	4	7	144	—	—	—	—	—
2000–01	Manitoba Moose	IHL	67	1	5	6	232	8	0	0	0	26
2001–02	Portland Pirates	AHL	53	1	7	8	212	—	—	—	—	—
2002–03	Portland Pirates	AHL	57	5	2	7	139	3	0	0	0	6
2003–04	Washington Capitals	NHL	2	0	0	0	2	—	—	—	—	—
2003–04	Portland Pirates	AHL	53	0	1	1	118	—	—	—	—	—
2004–05	Belfast Giants	EIHL	30	2	7	9	191	8	0	1	1	42
2005–06	Newcastle Vipers	EIHL	7	0	1	1	37	—	—	—	—	—
2005–06	Motor City Mechanics	UHL	45	4	3	7	142	2	1	0	1	0
2006–07	Adelaide Avalanche	AIHL	7	2	5	7	51	—	—	—	—	—
2011–12	Bentley Generals	Chinnok HL	3	1	0	1	4	—	—	—	—	—
NHL totals			2	0	0	0	2	—	—	—	—	—
AHL totals			167	6	10	16	490	3	0	0	0	6
IHL totals			249	8	17	25	1,166	21	1	0	1	71
