= Brendan Witt =

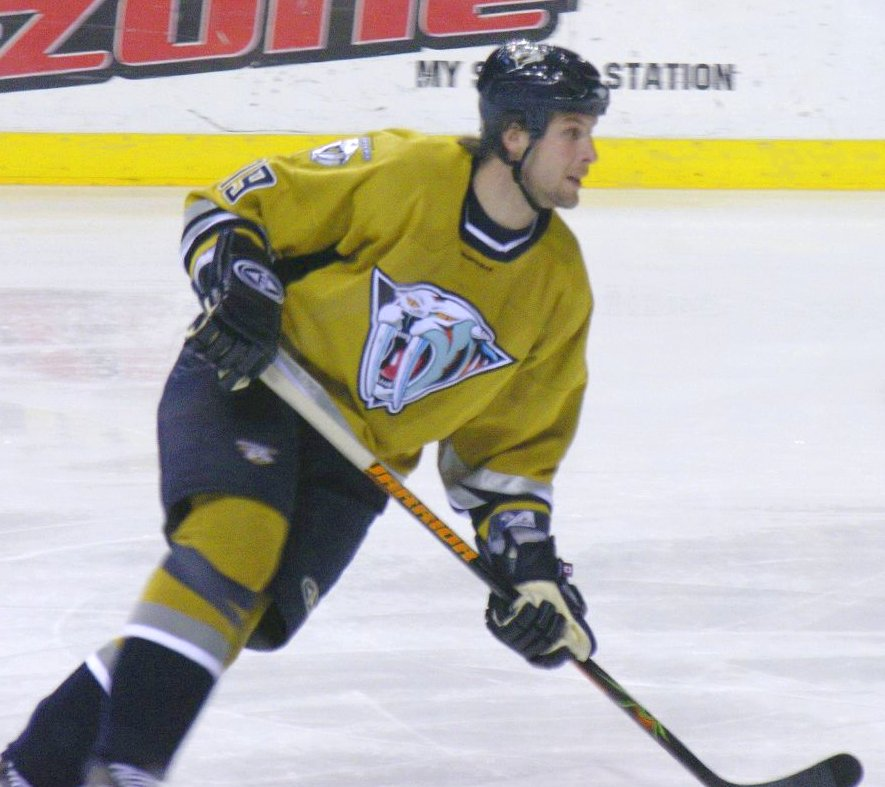
- Witt in 2006
- Born: February 20, 1975 (age 51) Humboldt, Saskatchewan, Canada
- Height: 6 ft 2 in (188 cm)
- Weight: 223 lb (101 kg; 15 st 13 lb)
- Position: Defence
- Shot: Left
- Played for: Washington Capitals; Nashville Predators; New York Islanders
- NHL draft: 11th overall, 1993; Washington Capitals
- Playing career: 1995–2010

Brendan Witt (born February 20, 1975) is a Canadian former professional ice hockey defenceman. He played for the Washington Capitals, Nashville Predators, and New York Islanders in the National Hockey League (NHL).

== Playing career ==
Witt's NHL career began with the Washington Capitals, the team that drafted him in the 1993 Entry Draft. In the 2000–01 NHL season, he led the league with 322 hits. Witt served as co-captain of the Washington Capitals during the 2001–02 NHL season, along with Steve Konowalchuk. Witt lost his share of the captaincy, when in a player vote (before the 2002–03 NHL season), the Capitals chose Konowalchuk as sole captain. After Konowalchuk's trade to the Avalanche (October 2003), the captaincy remained vacant until Jeff Halpern was appointed in September 2005.

During the 2004–05 NHL lockout Witt signed for the English BNL side, the Bracknell Bees. He only played three games for Bracknell before returning home due to a fire at his house. During his three games he scored one goal and got four assists for a total of five points.

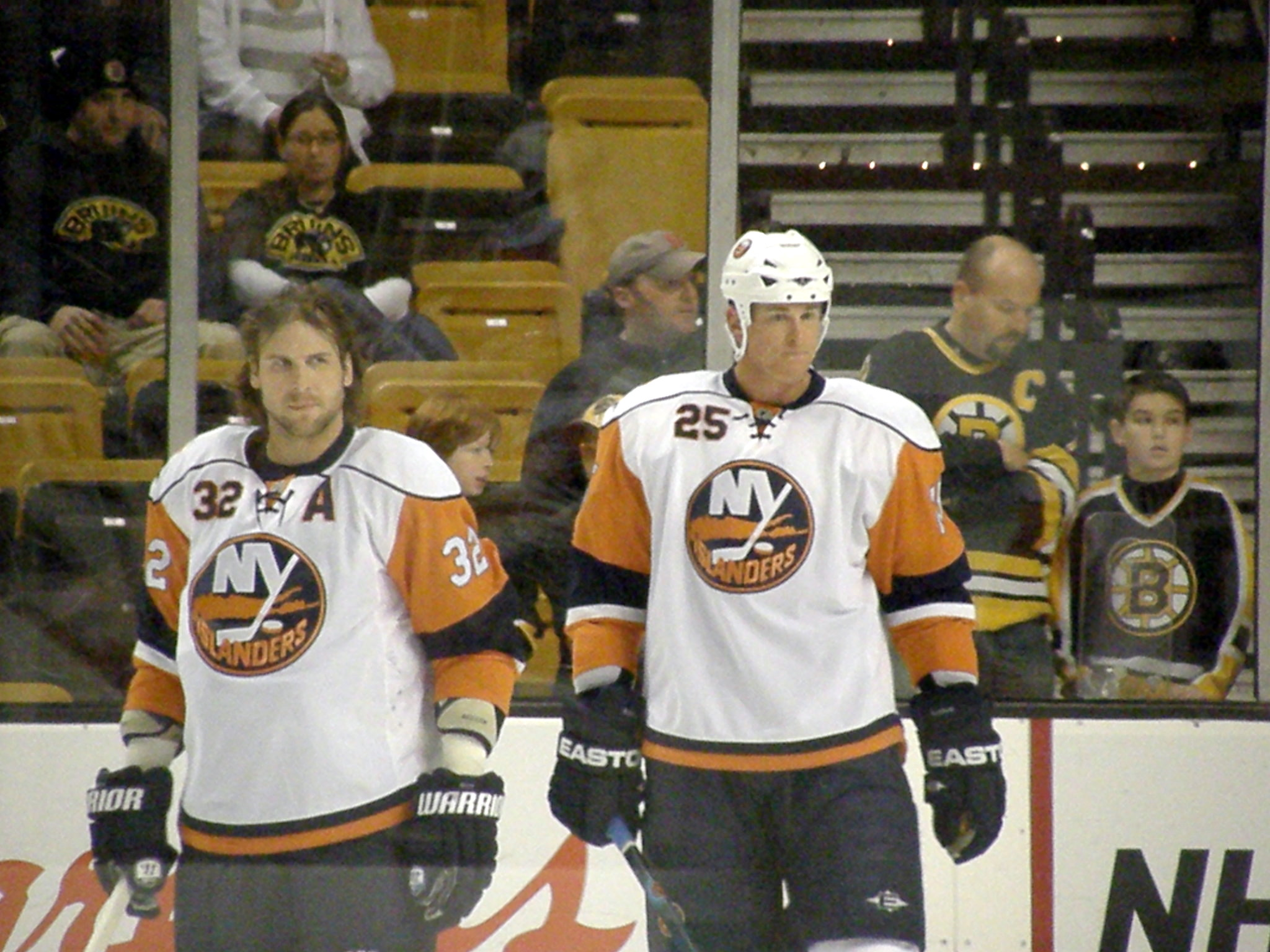
Witt and Andy Sutton in 2008

In August 2005, Witt made a trade request to the Capitals management, to be traded to a team with a better chance of competing for the Stanley Cup. Re-signed by the Capitals despite his trade request, he remained on the Capitals defense to start the 2005–06 season. His request for a trade was finally granted by the Capitals on March 9, 2006, when he was shipped to the Nashville Predators for former Capital Kris Beech and a first-round draft pick.

On July 3, 2006, Witt signed a three-year contract as a free agent with the New York Islanders and was named an alternate captain. On July 8, 2008, with a year of his original Islander contract still remaining, Witt signed a 2-year, $6 million extension to remain with the New York Islanders. During the 2008–09 season, on February 27, 2009, the NHL suspended Witt 5 games for an elbow to the head of Toronto Maple Leafs forward Niklas Hagman resulting in a concussion.

In January 2010, Witt was sent to the Islanders affiliate, the Bridgeport Sound Tigers, of the American Hockey League after clearing waivers. Completing the season with 2 goals in 27 games for Bridgeport, Witt was then bought out from the remaining year of his contract with the Islanders on August 1, 2010.

== Personal life ==
Witt and his wife Salima have two daughters, Aliana and Safiya. On January 30, 2007, Witt was the subject of a Sports Illustrated article in which he showed off his tattoos.

On December 8, 2009, while in Philadelphia for a game later that day against the Flyers, Witt was hit by an SUV while crossing Arch Street in Center City Philadelphia. The SUV made an illegal turn and hit Witt, who tried to jump on the hood of the vehicle before being thrown to the ground as he was hit. Witt picked himself up off the road, cursed, and assured the stunned onlookers that he was ok. Witt chose not to call police or get medical care, and was at the Islanders' morning skate just a few hours later.

== Career statistics ==
=== Regular season and playoffs ===
			Regular season					Playoffs
Season	Team	League	GP	G	A	Pts	PIM	GP	G	A	Pts	PIM
1990–91	Saskatoon Blazers AAA	SMHL	31	5	13	18	42	—	—	—	—	—
1990–91	Seattle Thunderbirds	WHL	—	—	—	—	—	1	0	0	0	0
1991–92	Seattle Thunderbirds	WHL	67	3	9	12	212	15	1	1	2	84
1992–93	Seattle Thunderbirds	WHL	70	2	26	28	239	5	1	2	3	30
1993–94	Seattle Thunderbirds	WHL	56	8	31	39	235	9	3	8	11	23
1995–96	Washington Capitals	NHL	48	2	3	5	85	—	—	—	—	—
1996–97	Portland Pirates	AHL	30	2	4	6	56	5	1	0	1	30
1996–97	Washington Capitals	NHL	44	3	2	5	88	—	—	—	—	—
1997–98	Washington Capitals	NHL	64	1	7	8	112	16	1	0	1	14
1998–99	Washington Capitals	NHL	54	2	5	7	87	—	—	—	—	—
1999–2000	Washington Capitals	NHL	77	1	7	8	114	3	0	0	0	0
2000–01	Washington Capitals	NHL	72	3	3	6	101	6	2	0	2	12
2001–02	Washington Capitals	NHL	68	3	7	10	78	—	—	—	—	—
2002–03	Washington Capitals	NHL	69	2	9	11	106	6	1	0	1	0
2003–04	Washington Capitals	NHL	72	2	10	12	123	—	—	—	—	—
2004–05	Bracknell Bees	BNL	3	1	4	5	0	—	—	—	—	—
2005–06	Washington Capitals	NHL	58	1	10	11	141	—	—	—	—	—
2005–06	Nashville Predators	NHL	17	0	3	3	68	5	0	0	0	12
2006–07	New York Islanders	NHL	81	1	13	14	131	5	0	1	1	6
2007–08	New York Islanders	NHL	59	2	5	7	51	—	—	—	—	—
2008–09	New York Islanders	NHL	65	0	9	9	94	—	—	—	—	—
2009–10	New York Islanders	NHL	42	2	3	5	45	—	—	—	—	—
2009–10	Bridgeport Sound Tigers	AHL	27	2	4	6	49	—	—	—	—	—
NHL totals			890	25	96	121	1424	41	4	1	5	44

=== International ===
Year	Team	Event	GP	G	A	Pts	PIM
1994	Canada	WJC	7	0	0	0	6

== Awards ==
- WHL West First All-Star Team – 1993 & 1994

Preceded by Sergei Gonchar	Washington Capitals first-round draft pick 1993	Succeeded by Jason Allison
Preceded by Adam Oates	Washington Capitals captain 2001–02 with Steve Konowalchuk	Succeeded by Steve Konowalchuk
