= Steve Konowalchuk =

American ice hockey player (born 1972)

- Born: November 11, 1972 (age 53) Salt Lake City, Utah, U.S.
- Height: 6 ft 1 in (185 cm)
- Weight: 195 lb (88 kg; 13 st 13 lb)
- Position: Left wing
- Shot: Left
- Played for: Washington Capitals; Colorado Avalanche
- National team: United States
- NHL draft: 58th overall, 1991; Washington Capitals
- Playing career: 1992–2006

Steven Reed Konowalchuk (born November 11, 1972) is an American former professional ice hockey left winger who played in the NHL with the Washington Capitals and the Colorado Avalanche. Most recently he was the head coach of the WHL's Red Deer Rebels. Konowalchuk is the first player born and raised in Utah to make it to the NHL level.

== Playing career ==
He was drafted by the Washington Capitals in the 1991 NHL entry draft, 3rd Round, 58th overall from the Portland Winterhawks of the Western Hockey League. During the 2001–02 NHL season he served as co-captain of the Capitals alongside teammate Brendan Witt. In October 2002 it was announced that he would serve as the tenth full-time captain of the Capitals. He would hold the position until he was traded to Colorado by Washington with Washington's third selection in the 2004 NHL entry draft in exchange for Bates Battaglia and the rights to Jonas Johansson on October 22, 2003. On September 29, 2006, Konowalchuk announced his retirement after a regular examination detected Long QT syndrome.

== Coaching career ==
After his retirement, Konowalchuk remained within the Avalanche organization and served as an assistant coach to Joe Sacco during the 2009–10 and 2010–11 season. In June 2011, he was named head coach of the Seattle Thunderbirds of the Western Hockey League. He led the team to a WHL championship in the 2016–17 season.

In June 2017, Konowalchuk left the Seattle Thunderbirds to join the NHL's Anaheim Ducks as an assistant coach.

Konowalchuk was fired from the Ducks after just one season. In September 2018, he was hired by the NHL's New York Rangers as an amateur scout, mainly focused on prospects in the Western Hockey League.

On June 8, 2021, the Red Deer Rebels announced that Konowalchuk would take over from owner & general manager, Brent Sutter as head coach of the hockey club.

On May 20, 2024, the St. Louis Blues announced Konowalchuk as the head coach of its AHL affiliate, the Springfield Thunderbirds.

On January 19, 2026, Konowalchuk was relieved of his coaching duties in Springfield and replaced with Steve Ott.

== Career statistics ==
=== Regular season and playoffs ===
			Regular season					Playoffs
Season	Team	League	GP	G	A	Pts	PIM	GP	G	A	Pts	PIM
1989–90	Prince Albert Midget Raiders	SMHL	36	30	28	58	22	—	—	—	—	—
1990–91	Portland Winter Hawks	WHL	72	43	49	92	78	—	—	—	—	—
1991–92	Portland Winter Hawks	WHL	64	51	53	104	95	6	3	6	9	12
1991–92	Washington Capitals	NHL	1	0	0	0	0	—	—	—	—	—
1991–92	Baltimore Skipjacks	AHL	3	1	1	2	0	—	—	—	—	—
1992–93	Washington Capitals	NHL	36	4	7	11	16	2	0	1	1	0
1992–93	Baltimore Skipjacks	AHL	37	18	28	46	74	—	—	—	—	—
1993–94	Washington Capitals	NHL	62	12	14	26	33	11	0	1	1	10
1993–94	Portland Pirates	AHL	8	11	4	15	4	—	—	—	—	—
1994–95	Washington Capitals	NHL	46	11	14	25	44	7	2	5	7	12
1995–96	Washington Capitals	NHL	70	23	22	45	92	2	0	2	2	0
1996–97	Washington Capitals	NHL	78	17	25	42	67	—	—	—	—	—
1997–98	Washington Capitals	NHL	80	10	24	34	80	—	—	—	—	—
1998–99	Washington Capitals	NHL	45	12	12	24	26	—	—	—	—	—
1999–2000	Washington Capitals	NHL	82	16	27	43	80	5	1	0	1	2
2000–01	Washington Capitals	NHL	82	24	23	47	87	6	2	3	5	14
2001–02	Washington Capitals	NHL	28	2	12	14	23	—	—	—	—	—
2002–03	Washington Capitals	NHL	77	15	15	30	71	6	0	0	0	6
2003–04	Washington Capitals	NHL	6	0	1	1	0	—	—	—	—	—
2003–04	Colorado Avalanche	NHL	76	19	20	39	70	11	4	0	4	12
2005–06	Colorado Avalanche	NHL	21	6	9	15	14	2	0	0	0	4
NHL totals			790	171	225	396	703	52	9	12	21	60

=== International ===
Year	Team	Event	GP	G	A	Pts	PIM
1992	United States	WJC	7	4	0	4	8
1996	United States	WCH	1	0	0	0	0
2000	United States	WC	7	2	1	3	2
2002	United States	WC	7	2	1	3	4
2004	United States	WCH	5	0	0	0	4
Senior totals			20	4	2	6	10

== Coaching record ==
Team	Year	League	Regular season							Postseason
Team	Year	League	G	W	L	T	OTL	Pts	Finish	Result
SEA	2011–12	WHL	72	25	45	1	1	52	5th in U.S.	Missed playoffs
SEA	2012–13	WHL	72	24	38	7	3	58	4th in U.S.	Lost in First round (KEL)
SEA	2013–14	WHL	72	41	25	2	4	88	2nd in U.S.	Lost in West Semifinals (KEL)
SEA	2014–15	WHL	72	38	25	4	5	85	3rd in U.S.	Lost in First round (POR)
SEA	2015–16	WHL	72	45	23	4	0	94	1st in U.S.	Lost WHL Finals (BRN)
SEA	2016–17	WHL	72	46	20	4	2	98	2nd in U.S.	Won Ed Chynoweth Cup (REG)
SEA Totals			432	219	176	22	15	475		
RD	2021–22	WHL	68	45	19	2	2	94	2nd in Central	Lost in East Semifinals (EDM)
RD	2022–23	WHL	68	43	19	3	3	92	1st in Central	Lost in East Semifinals (SSK)
RD Totals			136	88	38	5	5	186		
WHL totals			568	307	214	29	22	661		

== Awards ==
- WHL West First All-Star Team – 1992

Sporting positions
Preceded by Adam Oates	Washington Capitals captain 2001–03 with Brendan Witt, 2001–02	Succeeded by Jeff Halpern
