= Darcy Verot =

Canadian ice hockey player (born 1976)

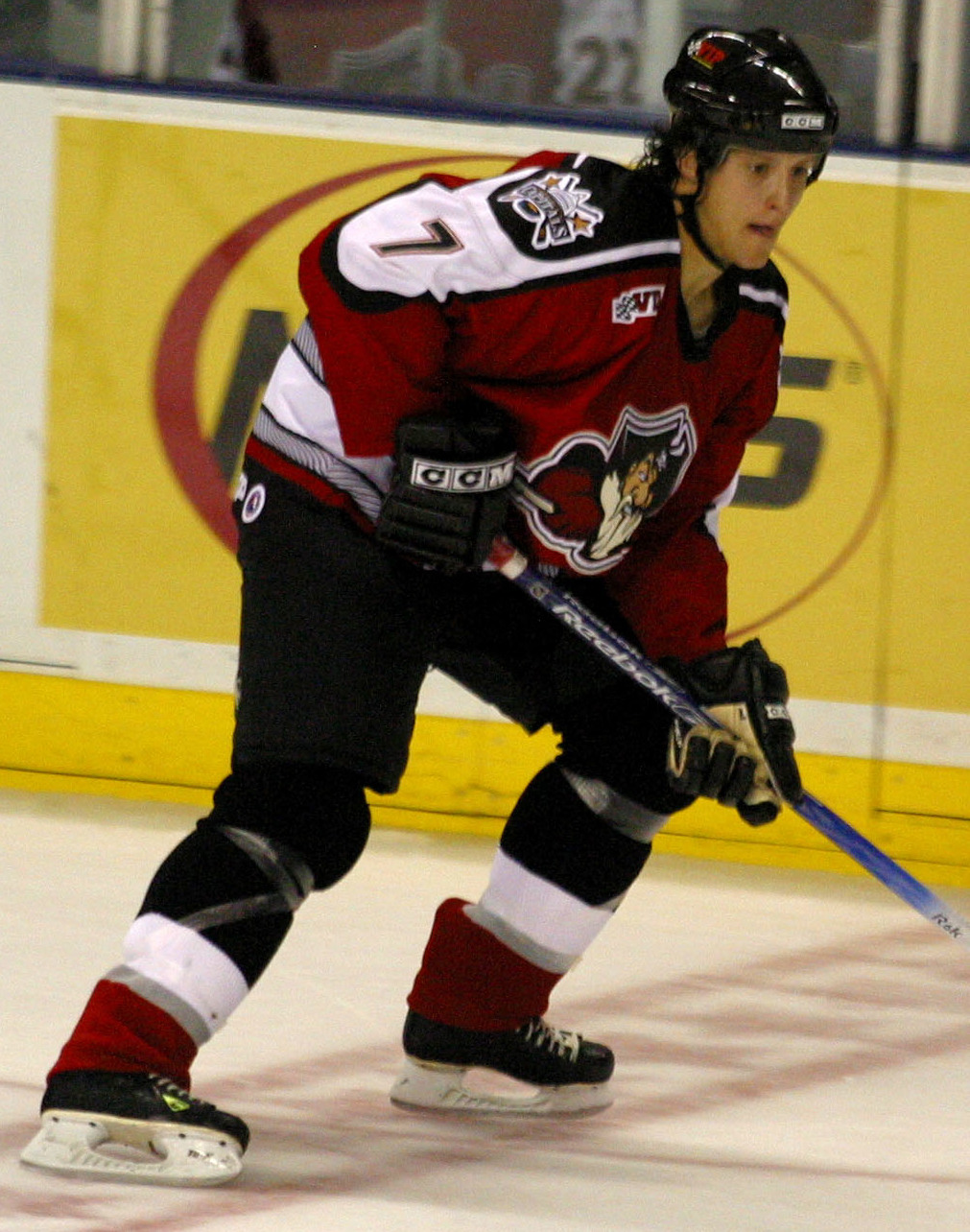
- Verot with the Portland Pirates in 2004
- Born: July 13, 1976 (age 49) Radville, Saskatchewan, Canada
- Height: 6 ft 0 in (183 cm)
- Weight: 199 lb (90 kg; 14 st 3 lb)
- Position: Left wing
- Shot: Left
- Played for: Washington Capitals; Oceláři Třinec; Vityaz Chekhov; CSKA Moscow
- NHL draft: Undrafted
- Playing career: 1997–2014

Darcy Verot (born July 13, 1976) is a Canadian former professional ice hockey forward. He played 37 games in the National Hockey League with the Washington Capitals during the 2003–04 season. The rest of his career, which lasted from 1997 to 2014, was spent in the minor leagues and Europe.

== Career ==
Verot started his professional career in 1997 in the Western Professional Hockey League). He ended his career in the Kontinental Hockey League (KHL) in Russia, retiring in 2014. Signed as a free agent in 2000 by the Pittsburgh Penguins, Verot made his NHL debut with the Washington Capitals, playing 37 games during the 2003–04 NHL season before the NHL lockout in 2004–05. Verot led all players in penalty minutes for the last half of the season.

In 2002, Verot played with the Calgary Flames organization before signing a two-way contract in 2005 with the Columbus Blue Jackets. He played two seasons with the Blue Jackets' American Hockey League affiliate, the Syracuse Crunch. In 2007, after a serious shoulder injury, Verot signed with Vityaz Chekhov of the KHL and amassed more than 1000 penalty minutes over five years. In 2011, Verot signed with KHL's powerhouse team, CSKA Moscow.

While with Russia, he was involved in multiple incidents, particularly in games against rival Avangard Omsk. Notably, he fought star Jaromír Jágr (who was briefly his teammate in Washington) on a couple of occasions, losing each time. When Verot tried out for Czech Extraliga club Oceláři Třinec in 2011, Jágr, who owns another club in the league, expressed outrage.

== Personal life ==
Verot is married to Nicole Pizzolatto of Lake Charles, Louisiana and the couple has five children together.

== Career statistics ==
=== Regular season and playoffs ===
			Regular season					Playoffs
Season	Team	League	GP	G	A	Pts	PIM	GP	G	A	Pts	PIM
1994–95	Weyburn Red Wings	SJHL	57	8	18	26	240	16	2	5	7	50
1995–96	Weyburn Red Wings	SJHL	64	15	30	45	191	3	1	0	1	20
1996–97	Weyburn Red Wings	SJHL	61	26	51	77	218	13	3	8	11	24
1997–98	Lake Charles Ice Pirates	WPHL	68	11	26	37	269	4	0	1	1	25
1998–99	Lake Charles Ice Pirates	WPHL	68	17	23	40	236	9	2	4	6	53
1999–00	Wheeling Nailers	ECHL	44	7	12	19	240	—	—	—	—	—
1999–00	Wilkes-Barre/Scranton Penguins	AHL	23	5	5	10	96	—	—	—	—	—
2000–01	Wilkes-Barre/Scranton Penguins	AHL	78	10	15	25	347	21	2	3	5	40
2001–02	Wilkes-Barre/Scranton Penguins	AHL	71	6	10	16	387	—	—	—	—	—
2002–03	Saint John Flames	AHL	73	5	11	16	299	—	—	—	—	—
2003–04	Washington Capitals	NHL	37	0	2	2	135	—	—	—	—	—
2003–04	Portland Pirates	AHL	28	3	5	8	89	—	—	—	—	—
2004–05	Portland Pirates	AHL	36	0	1	1	189	—	—	—	—	—
2005–06	Syracuse Crunch	AHL	20	1	3	4	64	—	—	—	—	—
2006–07	Syracuse Crunch	AHL	68	9	14	23	227	—	—	—	—	—
2007–08	Vityaz Chekhov	RSL	43	2	2	4	508	—	—	—	—	—
2008–09	Vityaz Chekhov	KHL	28	1	4	5	170	—	—	—	—	—
2009–10	Vityaz Chekhov	KHL	34	1	4	5	374	—	—	—	—	—
2010–11	Vityaz Chekhov	KHL	20	2	1	3	169	—	—	—	—	—
2011–12	HC Oceláři Třinec	CZE	1	0	0	0	12	—	—	—	—	—
2011–12	CSKA Moscow	KHL	16	0	0	0	74	—	—	—	—	—
2012–13	Rubin Tyumen	VHL	26	4	2	6	145	—	—	—	—	—
2013–14	Arizona Sundogs	CHL	7	0	0	0	14	—	—	—	—	—
AHL totals			397	39	64	103	1698	21	2	3	5	40
NHL totals			37	0	2	2	135	—	—	—	—	—
