= Dwayne Zinger =

Canadian ice hockey player

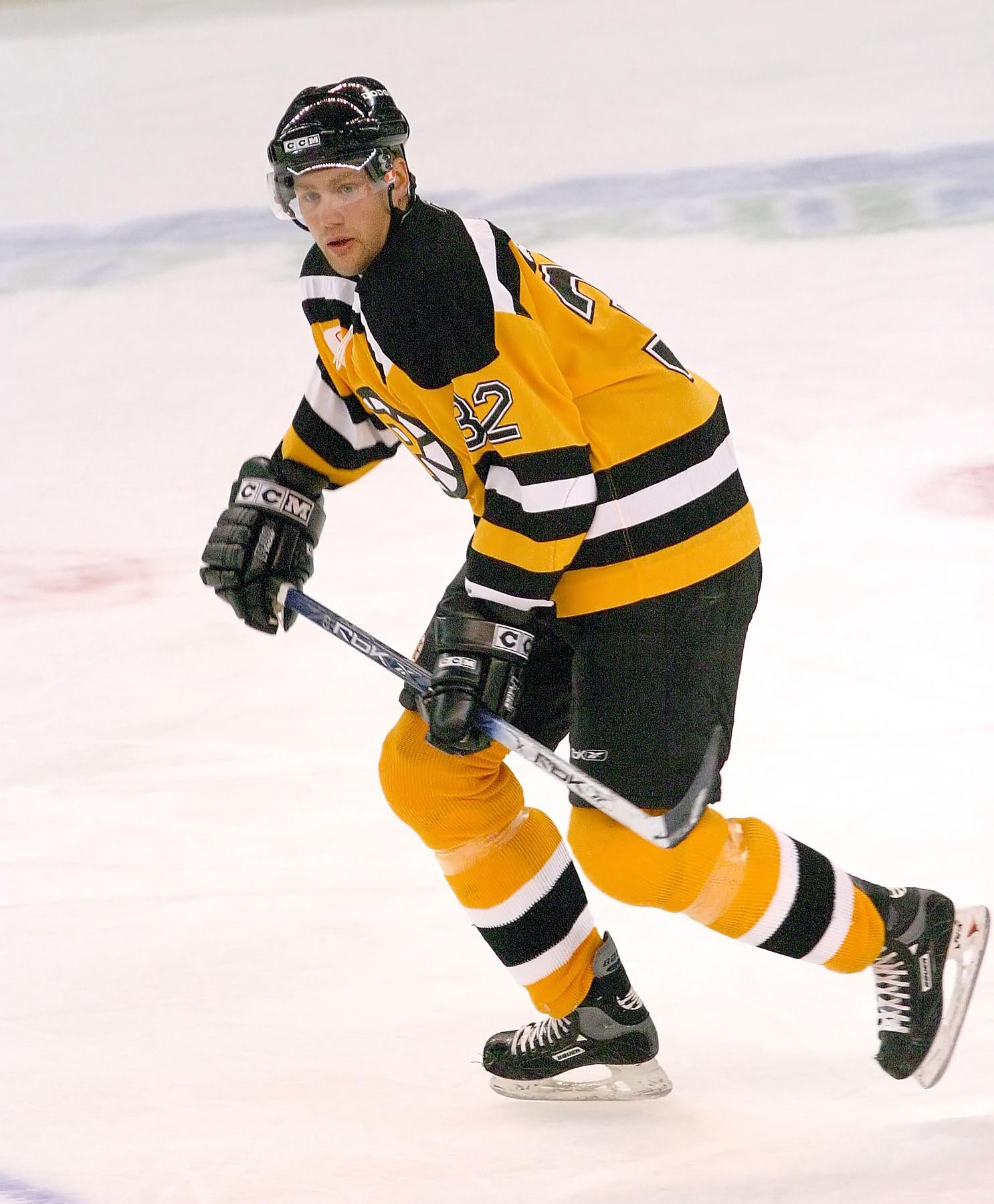
- Zinger with the Providence Bruins in 2007
- Born: July 5, 1976 (age 49) Coronation, Alberta, Canada
- Height: 6 ft 4 in (193 cm)
- Weight: 220 lb (100 kg; 15 st 10 lb)
- Position: Defence
- Shot: Left
- Played for: Washington Capitals; Odense Bulldogs
- NHL draft: Undrafted
- Playing career: 2000–2010

Dwayne Zinger (born July 5, 1976) is a Canadian former professional ice hockey defenceman who played briefly in the National Hockey League (NHL) with the Washington Capitals.

== Playing career ==
Undrafted, Zinger was signed by the Detroit Red Wings as a free agent in 2000 after graduating from the University of Alaska-Fairbanks. He played eight seasons in the American Hockey League between 2000 and 2008, and played seven National Hockey League games with the Washington Capitals in 2003–04 NHL season, recording one assist. He played the 2008–09 season with the Odense Bulldogs of the Danish Elite League. On September 14, 2009, Zinger returned to North America and signed a one-year contract with the Cincinnati Cyclones of the ECHL for the 2009–10 season.

After the conclusion of his playing career, Zinger was named the head coach of the Queen City Storm of the then All American Hockey League on September 27, 2010. Upon the club suspending operations and the League going defunct, Zinger later accepted a position for two seasons as an assistant coach with the Greenville Road Warriors of the ECHL.

== Career statistics ==
			Regular season					Playoffs
Season	Team	League	GP	G	A	Pts	PIM	GP	G	A	Pts	PIM
1996–97	University of Alaska Fairbanks	CCHA	32	1	5	6	45	—	—	—	—	—
1997–98	University of Alaska Fairbanks	CCHA	32	1	3	4	91	—	—	—	—	—
1998–99	University of Alaska Fairbanks	CCHA	33	4	14	18	42	—	—	—	—	—
1999–00	University of Alaska Fairbanks	CCHA	34	10	4	14	36	—	—	—	—	—
1999–00	Cincinnati Mighty Ducks	AHL	14	0	2	2	33	—	—	—	—	—
2000–01	Cincinnati Mighty Ducks	AHL	68	6	9	15	120	4	1	1	2	2
2001–02	Cincinnati Mighty Ducks	AHL	67	6	13	19	156	3	0	1	1	2
2002–03	Portland Pirates	AHL	65	1	7	8	67	3	0	0	0	2
2003–04	Portland Pirates	AHL	68	6	10	16	49	7	0	0	0	16
2003–04	Washington Capitals	NHL	7	0	1	1	9	—	—	—	—	—
2004–05	Portland Pirates	AHL	58	0	4	4	118	—	—	—	—	—
2005–06	Hershey Bears	AHL	30	0	0	0	74	—	—	—	—	—
2005–06	San Antonio Rampage	AHL	35	1	2	3	68	—	—	—	—	—
2006–07	Providence Bruins	AHL	78	3	15	18	100	12	1	1	2	13
2007–08	Providence Bruins	AHL	53	0	8	8	83	6	0	0	0	0
2008–09	Odense Bulldogs	DEN	35	2	9	11	52	7	1	1	2	2
2009–10	Cincinnati Cyclones	ECHL	37	3	5	8	41	—	—	—	—	—
AHL totals			536	23	70	93	868	35	2	3	5	35
NHL totals			7	0	1	1	9	—	—	—	—	—
