= Colin Forbes (ice hockey) =

Canadian ice hockey player

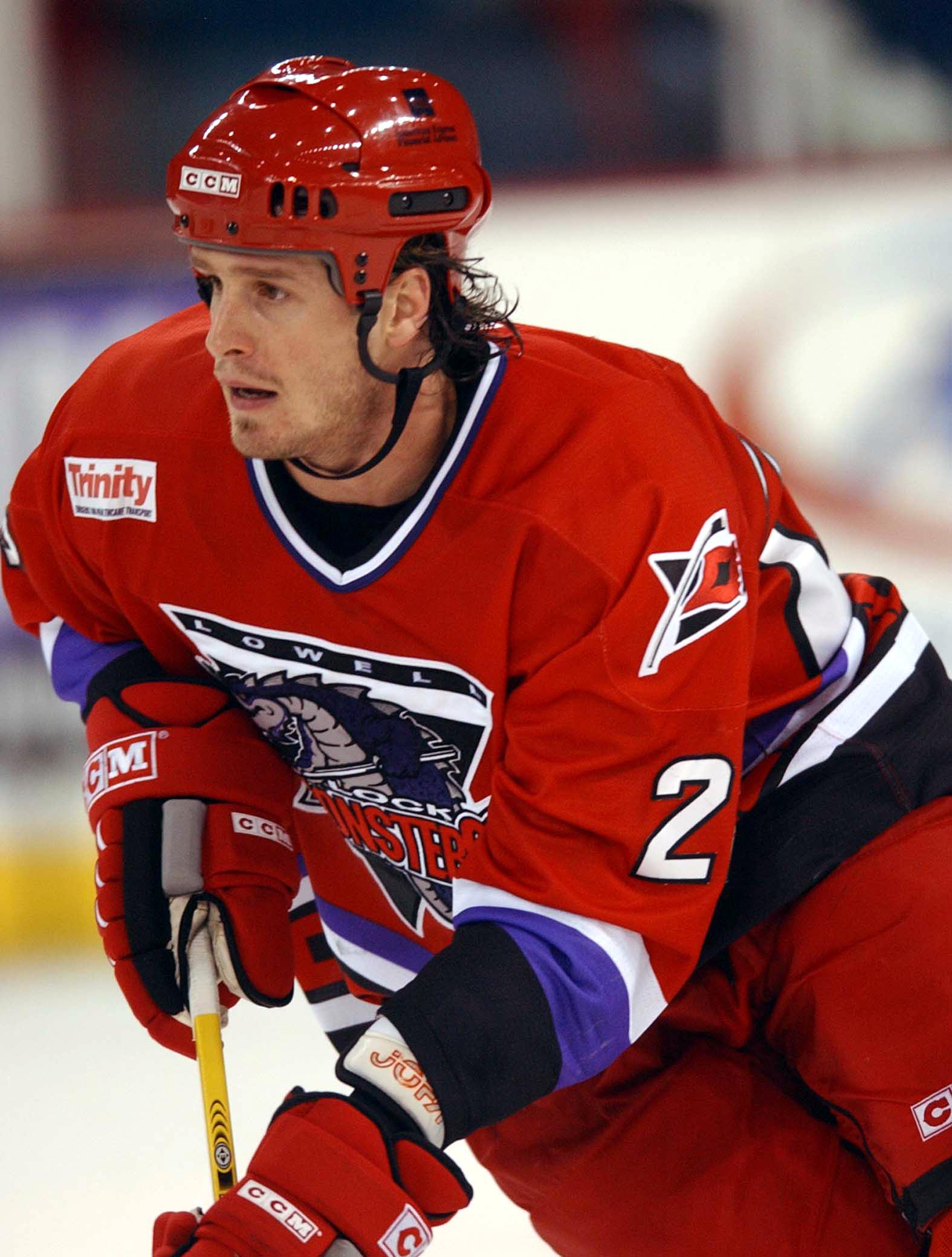
- Forbes with the Lowell Lock Monsters in 2004
- Born: February 16, 1976 (age 50) New Westminster, British Columbia, Canada
- Height: 6 ft 3 in (191 cm)
- Weight: 215 lb (98 kg; 15 st 5 lb)
- Position: Centre
- Shot: Left
- Played for: Philadelphia Flyers; Tampa Bay Lightning; Ottawa Senators; New York Rangers; Washington Capitals; Adler Mannheim; ERC Ingolstadt
- NHL draft: 166th overall, 1994; Philadelphia Flyers
- Playing career: 1996–2011

Colin Forbes (born February 16, 1976) is a Canadian former professional ice hockey forward who played in the National Hockey League (NHL) for the Philadelphia Flyers, Tampa Bay Lightning, Ottawa Senators, New York Rangers and Washington Capitals. Drafted 166th overall by the Flyers in the 1994 NHL entry draft, Forbes played a total of nine seasons in the NHL.

Forbes played the last five seasons of his professional career in Europe with the Adler Mannheim and lastly ERC Ingolstadt of the Deutsche Eishockey Liga (DEL).

== Career statistics ==
=== Regular season and playoffs ===
			Regular season					Playoffs
Season	Team	League	GP	G	A	Pts	PIM	GP	G	A	Pts	PIM
1993–94	Sherwood Park Crusaders	AJHL	47	18	22	40	76	—	—	—	—	—
1994–95	Portland Winter Hawks	WHL	72	24	31	55	108	9	1	3	4	10
1995–96	Portland Winter Hawks	WHL	72	33	44	77	137	7	2	5	7	14
1995–96	Hershey Bears	AHL	2	1	0	1	2	4	0	2	2	14
1996–97	Philadelphia Phantoms	AHL	74	21	28	49	108	10	5	5	10	33
1996–97	Philadelphia Flyers	NHL	3	1	0	1	0	3	0	0	0	0
1997–98	Philadelphia Phantoms	AHL	13	7	4	11	22	—	—	—	—	—
1997–98	Philadelphia Flyers	NHL	63	12	7	19	59	5	0	0	0	2
1998–99	Philadelphia Flyers	NHL	66	9	7	16	51	—	—	—	—	—
1998–99	Tampa Bay Lightning	NHL	14	3	1	4	10	—	—	—	—	—
1999–00	Tampa Bay Lightning	NHL	8	0	0	0	18	—	—	—	—	—
1999–00	Ottawa Senators	NHL	45	2	5	7	12	5	1	0	1	14
2000–01	Ottawa Senators	NHL	39	0	1	1	31	—	—	—	—	—
2000–01	New York Rangers	NHL	19	1	4	5	15	—	—	—	—	—
2001–02	Utah Grizzlies	AHL	4	0	0	0	21	—	—	—	—	—
2001–02	Washington Capitals	NHL	38	5	3	8	15	—	—	—	—	—
2001–02	Portland Pirates	AHL	14	4	5	9	18	—	—	—	—	—
2002–03	Washington Capitals	NHL	5	0	0	0	0	—	—	—	—	—
2002–03	Portland Pirates	AHL	69	22	38	60	73	3	2	2	4	4
2003–04	Washington Capitals	NHL	2	0	0	0	0	—	—	—	—	—
2003–04	Portland Pirates	AHL	69	16	32	48	59	7	0	6	6	16
2004–05	Lowell Lock Monsters	AHL	76	27	37	64	80	11	3	1	4	20
2005–06	Lowell Lock Monsters	AHL	35	10	18	28	24	—	—	—	—	—
2005–06	Washington Capitals	NHL	9	0	0	0	2	—	—	—	—	—
2005–06	Hershey Bears	AHL	36	11	12	23	16	21	5	9	14	16
2006–07	Adler Mannheim	DEL	51	11	29	40	50	11	4	10	14	24
2007–08	Adler Mannheim	DEL	54	12	15	27	22	5	1	1	2	8
2008–09	Adler Mannheim	DEL	54	17	25	42	52	8	2	3	5	35
2009–10	Adler Mannheim	DEL	54	12	25	37	32	2	0	0	0	2
2010–11	ERC Ingolstadt	DEL	52	6	15	21	46	4	0	2	2	20
NHL totals			311	33	28	61	213	13	1	0	1	16
DEL totals			263	58	109	167	202	30	7	16	23	89
