= Backgammon match strategy =

Type of backgammon strategy

In backgammon, there are a number of strategies that are distinct to match play as opposed to money play. These differences are most apparent when a player is within a few points of winning the match.

== Match format ==
Backgammon matches are played to a set number of points, ranging from 3 for informal matches to 25 or more for high-level tournaments. Traditionally matches are played to an odd number of points; however, there is no theoretical reason why a match should not be played to an even number of points.

=== The doubling cube ===
As with money play, the doubling cube is used. At the start of each game, the doubling cube is placed on the bar with the number 64 showing; the cube is then said to be "centered on 1". When the cube is centered, the player about to roll may propose that the game be played for twice the current stakes. Their opponent must either accept ("take") the doubled stakes or resign ("drop" or "pass") the game immediately.

If a player accepts a double, the cube is placed on their side of the board with the corresponding power of two facing upward to indicate that the right to re-double belongs exclusively to the player who last accepted a double; this player is then said to "own" the cube. A player who drops a double loses the game at the current value of the doubling cube. For example, if the cube is currently at 2 and a player wants to redouble the stakes to put it at 4, the opponent choosing to drop the redouble would concede 2 points to the opponent. There is no limit to the number of redoubles, although once the cube gets large enough further re-cubes won't matter to the outcome of the match and the cube is said to be "dead"; in practice a game is rarely doubled beyond 4 points. If a game is played to completion, the score is determined by the value of the doubling cube, multiplied by 2 in the case of a gammon, and by 3 in the case of a backgammon. For example, a player losing a gammon with the cube at 2 would concede 4 points to the opponent.

=== The Crawford rule ===
The Crawford rule, named after John R. Crawford, is designed to make match play more equitable for the player in the lead. If a player is one point away from winning a match, that player's opponent will always want to double as early as possible in order to catch up. Whether the game is worth one point or two, the trailing player must win to continue the match. To balance the situation, the Crawford rule requires that when a player first reaches a score one point short of winning, neither player may use the doubling cube for the following game, called the "Crawford game". After the Crawford game, normal use of the doubling cube resumes. The Crawford rule is routinely used in tournament match play. It is possible for a Crawford game never to occur in a match.

== Doubling strategy ==
=== General ===
When both players are several points away from the target score, doubling strategy is broadly similar to that of money play. The theoretical point for accepting a double is when a player's winning chances are 25% or higher. Suppose a player were offered the same double in the same position 4 times. If the player dropped 4 doubles, they would have a net loss of 4 points. If they accepted the double at 2, lost 3 games and won 1, the net loss would still be 4 points, i.e., 2 * (3 - 1)

In fact, a player can accept a double at slightly worse odds than 25%, due to the value of owning the cube, giving them the exclusive right to redouble. The corollary of this is that a player should be wary of "giving the cube away" too readily; generally an advantage corresponding to 70% winning chances or more is needed before a double becomes correct. The "doubling window" between which both the double and the take are correct is approximately 70% - 78%.

Players generally attempt to double at the "top of the market", i.e., as close as possible to the opponent's theoretical take point. If a player offers a double and the opponent correctly drops, the player is said to have "lost his market" or "doubled someone out". If both the double and the take are correct, the player has "kept his market" or "doubled someone in". While it is preferable to double someone in, due to the volatile nature of the game, this is not always possible. For example, if a player throws a "joker" which radically changes the assessment of the position (for example, a 6-6 in a racing situation), a position which was not a correct double on the previous roll may now be a "drop".

A complicating factor is the possibility of gammons (or more rarely backgammons). When a player has a reasonable chance of winning a gammon, a position may be "too good" to double, i.e., it may be correct to attempt to score 2 points by winning an undoubled gammon rather than "cash" a certain 1 point by doubling the opponent out. Additionally, the threat of a gammon can sometimes make it correct to double even with less than 65% winning chances, or to drop a double with more than 25% winning chances.

Complicating things still further, the specific match score can have a significant effect on correct doubling and checker play strategy.

=== Match specific doubling strategies ===
To facilitate discussion of match play strategy, scores are "normalised", i.e., referred to in terms of the number of points each player is away from victory. For example, if a player is leading 3-2 in a 5-point match, this is referred to as "2 away, 3 away" or "-2, -3"; likewise, if a player leads 13-12 in a 15-point match.

==== Double match point ====
"Double match point" (or DMP) refers to any situation where the match depends on the result of a single game, with gammons, backgammons, and cube actions being irrelevant. Common situations where double match point strategy comes into effect include a score of 1-away, 1-away; a post-Crawford game at 1-away, 2-away in which the leader accepts the inevitable early double; and a doubled game at 2-away, 2-away.

In double match point games, a "blitz", in which a player aggressively pursues a gammon by continually hitting in his own board at the risk of overextending his position, becomes a poor strategy. On the other hand, since gammons don't matter, back games, in which a player maintains two or more anchors in the opponent's home board with a view to hitting later in the game, become a more attractive option. However, double match point games are most commonly decided by a simple racing strategy when one player has an opportunity to break contact with the opponent while ahead in the race.

==== 2-away, 2-away ====
Between competent players, this will almost always be the final game of the match; one of the players will double early, the other will take, and play will take on a double match point character. The explanation for this is as follows:

If one of the players were to win a single game, making the score 1-away, 2-away Crawford, the trailing player's odds of winning the match would now be 30% (explanation below). Therefore, the take threshold for both players is a 30% or greater chance of winning the game, regardless of gammons. Additionally, it is important to double while the opponent can still take; should a player's advantage on the board exceed 70% winning chances, he will have "lost his market", allowing his opponent to drop the double and continue the match at 30% winning odds. It is an error not to double if there is any possibility of losing one's market; however, it is not an error to double even if no market losing possibility exists. For practical purposes, then, the simplest strategy is to double on the first move and get it over with.

==== 1-away, 2-away (Crawford game) ====
Since the cube will not come into play, there are two possible ways for the trailing player to win the match; he can win a gammon in the next game, or he can win the next game and then win the decider at DMP. The combined odds for the trailing player to win the match can be calculated at approximately 30%, assuming that 20% of the wins are gammons:

0.10 (odds of winning gammon in the next game) + 0.40 (odds of winning a single game) * 0.50 (odds of winning the following game) = 0.30.

Since gammon wins are very favorable to the trailer and gammon losses are very costly to the leader, this score is referred to as "gammon go" (GG) for the trailer and "gammon save" (GS) for the leader. The trailer should play more aggressively in pursuit of a gammon, i.e., try to steer the game into a blitz, a back game (for either side), or a prime vs. prime battle. The leader will try to avoid losing a gammon by attempting to establish an advanced anchor on the opponent's board or else try for a simple running game.

==== 1-away, 2-away (Post-Crawford game) - the "free drop" ====
The trailer should double at the first opportunity, thereby converting the game into a double match point situation. However, the leader has the option of the "free drop". If the leader is at a disadvantage, however slight, he should drop the double and start a new game at 1-away, 1-away. Whether the leader takes or drops, the next game will be the decider at DMP, so it is preferable to start a new game at 50 - 50 than continue the present game at 49.5 - 50.5.

The free drop is only a minor advantage to the leader, so to all intents and purposes a score of 1-away, 2-away post-Crawford is equivalent to 1-away, 1-away. The free drop also comes into consideration in any post-Crawford game in which the trailer is an even number of points away from victory. For example, a 1-away, 6-away post-Crawford is equivalent to a 1-away, 5-away save for the leader's free drop. In this case the leader may elect to "save" his free drop if he is at only a minimal disadvantage (e.g., having a sound position but losing the opening roll).

==== 1-away, 3-away (Post-Crawford game) - "the trick" ====
While it is technically correct for the trailer to cube at the first opportunity, the leader's takepoint is less than 10% at this score, so it can sometimes be beneficial for the trailer to wait until there's a larger advantage. Since the 1-away 2-away and 1-away 1-away are almost equivalent, the leader gives away almost nothing by accepting the cube.

By waiting, the trailer gives the leader the chance to mistakenly drop, allowing the trailer to "steal" a point. However, while the leader's take point is very low based on single-point losses, gammons are very costly with the cube on 2, so the leader should not take positions with significant gammon chances.

== Equivalent to Money Game (EMG) ==
For match play, Equivalent to Money Game (EMG) is commonly used to evaluate performance instead of (non-normalized) equity based only on match winning chances (MWC). Analyzing errors based on match winning chances results in the same error having very different changes in equity at different match scores. For instance, a checker-play mistake giving up 10% game-winning chances at the beginning of a 17 point match loses less than 1% MWC, but at a score of 16-16, it would lose the full 10% MWC. As Jeremy Bagai puts it, "The magnitude of an error's lost MWC tells us more about when the error occurs within the match than about the quality of the error in the abstract."

EMG is used to address this issue; EMG is the equity normalized linearly to the (-3, +3) interval that is the result space for money games. Mathematically,

EMG = 2 * (MWC-MWC(L))/(MWC(W)-MWC(L)) - 1

where MWC is the current match-winning chance, MWC(L) is the match-winning chance after losing the current game, and MWC(W) is the match-winning chance after winning the current game. MWC(L) and MWC(W) are values from a match equity table.

=== Match equity table (MET) ===
A match equity table (MET) is a chart containing the probabilities of winning a match at various scores, assuming equally matched opponents. In match play, the important part of the score is how many points away each player is away from winning the match, i.e. a score 2-1 in a 5 point match or 8-7 in an 11 point match would both be 3-away 4-away; the match equity table treats both the same. There are various match equity tables that have been calculated, including the Woolsey-Heinrich, Mec26, g11, and Rockwell-Kazaross match equity tables. Here is the Rockwell-Kazaross MET for scores up to 5-away 5-away, expressed in match winning percentage:

	1	2	3	4	5
1	50	67.7	75.1	81.4	84.2
2	32.3	50	59.9	66.9	74.3
3	24.9	40.1	50	57.1	64.8
4	18.6	33.1	42.9	50	57.7
5	15.8	25.7	35.2	42.3	50

For example, at 3-away 4-away, the leader's match-winning chances are 57.1% and the trailer's winning chances are 42.9%. For entries where one of the players is 1-away, it assumes that the next game will be the Crawford game.

== See also ==
- World Backgammon Federation
