= Masayuki Mochizuki =

Japanese backgammon player

- Born: January 9, 1979 (age 47)
- Other name: Mochy
- Occupation: Backgammon player
- Years active: 1998 - Present
- Awards: Backgammon World Champion

Masayuki “Mochy” Mochizuki (born January 9, 1979) is a Japanese professional backgammon player from Tokyo. Widely regarded as one of the best in the game, he is a two-time Backgammon World Champion and is ranked #1 in the Backgammon Giants List. He has been competing on the international circuit since 1998.

== Career ==
Mochy has been ranked #1 on the Backgammon Giants List since 2009, except for 2011 when he was ranked #2 after Falafel.

In 2017, Mochy earned the Super Grandmaster S3 title, and in 2019, he achieved the Super Grandmaster S2 title by maintaining a performance rating (PR) below 2.25 over 300 experience points (exp) at the Backgammon Masters Awarding Body (BMAB). This made him the first backgammon player to achieve Super Grandmaster title in BMAB history, and he remained the only Super Grandmaster for seven years.

In the same year, Mochy won the inaugural Ultimate Backgammon Championship (UBC). He played in the UBC finals for six consecutive years, winning four of them.

In addition to his playing career, Mochy serves as the president of the Japan Backgammon Society (JBS), the president of the Backgammon Masters Awarding Body (BMAB), and a board member of the World Backgammon Federation (WBGF)

== Achievements ==
- Backgammon World Champion (2009, 2021)
- #1 on the Backgammon Giants List (2009, 2013, 2015, 2017, 2019, 2022, 2024)
- First-ever BMAB Super Grandmaster
- Ultimate Backgammon Championship Winner (4x total)
- Inducted into the American Backgammon Hall of Fame (2023)

== Publications ==
Mochizuki has written and contributed to multiple books on backgammon strategy, including:

- Backgammon Masterclass in English
- Backgammon Book in Japanese
- Introduction to Backgammon in Japanese
