= Zoe Cunningham =

British business executive and competitive backgammon player

- Education: Cambridge University
- Occupations: Business executive, Actress
- Years active: 2000 to present
- Employer: Softwire
- Known for: Champion backgammon player
- Title: Managing Director
- Awards: 2010 Ladies World Backgammon Championship
- Website: Official website

Zoe Cunningham is a British business executive and competitive backgammon player. Cunningham serves as the Managing Director of Softwire. She is an advocate for women in technology related businesses, and a contributor to business columns in UK periodicals. In 2010 she became the Ladies World Backgammon Champion.

== Business career ==
Cunningham is a graduate of the Mathematics Faculty at Cambridge University. She is the Managing Director of Softwire, starting with the company as a coder in 2000. In 2013 she was nominated for her work at Softwire as Inspiration of the Year at the FDM Everywoman in Technology Awards. She was also named to the annual 35 Women Under 35 list published by Management Today. In 2013 she founded the Small Software Association and served as CEO of London's Tech Talkfest networking conference. By 2016 Softwire was named "one of the UK’s leading software development companies".

She was also awarded the Ten Outstanding Young People Award by the Junior Chamber International London. Computer Weekly named her a rising star within the British IT industry on their annual 25 most influential women in UK IT list published in 2013. At the end of 2013 Cunningham was named by The Independent newspaper as one of its "Businesswoman of the Future". In December 2013 she was a member of British Prime Minister David Cameron's engineering and manufacturing delegation to China.

Cunningham is an advocate for women in technology and especially those who start their own businesses or become involved with start-ups. She is also an advocate for SME spending by the UK government, and has been critical of the government's dearth of spending on helping these types of enterprises evolve. On a smaller scale, she is also an advocate for local networking among small business in the UK.

== Backgammon ==
Cunningham was the winner of the 35th World Backgammon Championship's ladies tournament in Monte Carlo - in addition to being named as a member of the 2010 World Championship's dream-team. She was also the 2005 Mind Sports Olympiad Cambridge backgammon tournament champion, and a finalist at two World Series of Backgammon tournaments in 2008. These tournaments did not divide men and women into separate groups, and Cunningham has been an advocate for not allowing the separation of the genders in international backgammon tournaments. She is also an advocate for the popularization of tournament backgammon and increased television coverage of the game.

== Writing ==
In 2014 Cunningham released the book Galvanizing The Geeks: Tips for managing technical people. Cunningham has also been a contributor to the magazine Computer Weekly, as well as to The Guardian newspaper and The Huffington Post.

== Radio, stage and television ==
Cunningham is a radio presenter and DJ. In 2013 she was nominated for a Radio Academy Awards' Sony Golden Headphones award during the award's inaugural year. She has a show on ZoneOneRadio where she discusses technology, and a new music show on Shoreditch Radio, both broadcast from the UK. On 9 February 2013 Cunningham placed second in the first season of the BBC television series Britain's Brightest. In 2014-15, Cunningham appeared as a member of the Coders team in several episodes of series 10 of Only Connect. She has also performed on stage at festivals such as the Brighton Fringe. She also appeared in the short film Symptoms, and the stage play Bystanders.

== Personal life ==
Cunningham is married to technology entrepreneur Sean Williams.
