= Mads Andersen =

Mads Andersen may refer to:

- Mads Andersen (chess player) (born 1995), Danish chess grandmaster
- Mads Andersen (poker player) (born 1970), Danish poker and backgammon player
- Mads Andersen (rower) (born 1978), Danish lightweight rower
- Mads Andersen (cyclist) (born 2000), Danish cyclist
- Mads Juel Andersen (born 1997), Danish footballer
