= Rollout =

Rollout or Roll Out may refer to:

== Arts and media ==
- Roll Out, a 1970s American sitcom
- "Rollout (My Business)", a song by Ludacris
- Rollout photography, a photographic process
- "Roll Out", a song by Labelle from Back to Now

== Games and sports ==
- Rollout (backgammon), an analysis technique for backgammon positions and moves
- Rollout, a play in American football in which a quarterback moves toward the sideline before attempting to pass

== Science and technology ==
- Rollout (drag racing), acceleration measurement used in North America autosports
- Rollout/Rollin, a computer operating system memory management technique
- Rollout, stage of landing in which an aircraft decelerates on the runway
- Product launch or rollout, the introduction of a new product or service to market
- Rollout (Artificial Intelligence), a randomized search technique to improve an agent during training and inference

== See also ==
- Debut (disambiguation)
