= Katie Scalamandre =

Katie Scalamandre became World Backgammon champion in 2000 on defeating Thomas Holm of Denmark. Her husband Gino is a noted backgammon player as well. She was ranked 62nd on a list of "100 of the Best Backgammon Players."
