= Yazawa =

Yazawa (written: 矢沢, 矢澤, 谷沢 or 谷澤) is a Japanese surname. Notable people with the surname include:

- Ai Yazawa (矢沢 あい, born 1967), Japanese manga author
- Aki Yazawa (矢澤 亜希, born 1991), Japanese slalom canoeist
- Akiko Yazawa (矢澤 亜希子, born 1980), Japanese professional backgammon player
- Eikichi Yazawa (矢沢 永吉, born 1949), Japanese singer-songwriter
- Erika Yazawa (谷澤 恵里香, born 1990), Japanese gravure idol
- Kazuki Yazawa (矢澤 一輝, born 1989), Japanese slalom canoeist
- Nao Yazawa (谷沢 直), Japanese manga artist
- Tatsuya Yazawa (谷澤 達也, born 1984), Japanese footballer
- Wataru Yazawa (矢澤 航, born 1991), Japanese hurdler
- Yoko Yazawa (矢沢 洋子, born 1985), Japanese singer-songwriter

== Fictional characters ==
- Yazawa - fictional character from Kamen Rider Blade. The human guise of the Capricorn Undead
- Nico Yazawa, a character in the anime and franchise Love Live! School Idol Project
- Kokoro Yazawa, a character in the anime Love Live! School Idol Project
- Kokoa Yazawa, a character in the anime Love Live! School Idol Project
- Kotaro Yazawa, a character in the anime Love Live! School Idol Project
- Riko Yazawa, a character in the anime and game Little Battlers Experience

== Geography ==
- Yasawa Islands in Fiji
