= Tim Holland =

Tim Holland may refer to:

- Tim Holland (backgammon) (1931–2010), backgammon world champion
- Timothy Holland, geologist
- Tim Holland (politician), Canadian Green Party candidate
- Sole (hip-hop artist) (born 1977), real name Tim Holland
