= WSOB =

WSOB may refer to:

- World Series of Backgammon
- World Series of Blackjack
- World Series of Bowling
