= Hypergammon =

Backgammon variant

Hypergammon is a variant of backgammon.

== Rule variations ==
Each player begins with three pieces, rather than fifteen. At the start of the game, each player begins with one piece on each of the three most distant points of the board (the 22-point, the 23-point and the 24-point).

Hypergammon is often played using the Jacoby Rule, which is also used in backgammon money games. Under this rule, gammons and backgammons will not count extra until the cube has been doubled.

== Gameplay ==
As a consequence of the reduced number of pieces, many people believe that hypergammon relies more heavily on luck than backgammon. The difficulty of getting two pieces on the same point means that both players nearly always have blots on the board. The combination of the fact that bearing off can be completed with a single lucky roll of doubles, and that it is nearly impossible to protect blots from being sent to the bar, results in gammons being scored much more often than in backgammon. This also means the lead in a game can swing very quickly.

In fact, for most players, the skill-to-luck ratio (or, more precisely, the error-to-luck ratio) is much higher in hypergammon than in backgammon, which means that a skillful player can achieve a statistically significant lead much more quickly in hypergammon than in backgammon. The best moves in hypergammon (especially doubling decisions) are often subtle and less easily conceptualized than those of backgammon.

Hypergammon has been 'solved', in the sense that computers can now play perfect hypergammon. Nevertheless, it is still a very challenging game for human players. The development of heuristics for expert play is very much an open topic.

In the early 1990s Hugh Sconyers solved Hyper Backgammon using a computer. There are over 32,000,000 possible positions when you include the double cube. In addition, Sconyers solved 1, 2 and 4 checker backgammon, which have similar starting positions.

== Popularity ==
Coming out in 1991, Hypergammon was and is known to be part of an online computer application. It can be played in real life as a board game too, but even now, people competitively play the game and try what they can to keep their rank one title. Marc Olsen is known as a 'grandmaster' Hypergammon player, and has written about strategies for playing the backgammon variant.

== Competition ==
Hyper Backgammon has been included within the Mind Sports Olympiad program, for the first time in the in-person event in London 2023, after holding it in the online versions in 2020 and 2021 and the online Grand Prix.

=== Hyper Backgammon at the Mind Sports Olympiad ===
Games	Gold	Silver	Bronze
London 2023	David Alatorre López; Mexico	Júlia Alemany Sánchez; Spain	Mahmoud Jahanbani; Iran
London 2025	David Alatorre López; Mexico	Cristian Ghena; Romania	Martin Thompson; England

=== Hyper Backgammon at the Mind Sports Olympiad Grand Prix (Online) ===
Games	Gold	Silver	Bronze
Grand Prix 2020	Robert Kreisl; Austria	David Pearce; England	Scott Agius; England Simon Jones; England
Grand Prix 2021	Robert Kreisl; Austria	Bernhard Mayr; Austria	Michael Mesich; United States Stylianos Ktistakis; Greece
Grand Prix 2022	Chasse Rehwinkel; United States	Cristian Ghena; Romania	Saravanan Sathyanandha; England
Grand Prix 2023	Sandu Toader Mihai; Austria	Cristian Ghena; Romania	Pietro Rossi; Italy
Grand Prix 2024	Cristian Ghena; Romania	Florin Popa; Romania	Antonio Anelli; Italy Marco Conte; Italy
Grand Prix 2025	Kevin Naishtat; Austria	Pietro Rossi; Italy	Matt Tucker; England

== See also ==
- World Backgammon Federation
