= Opening theory =

Opening theory may refer to:

- Backgammon opening theory
- Chess opening theory
- Go opening theory
