= Backgammon opening theory =

Initial moves strategy of a backgammon game

The first moves of a backgammon game are the opening moves, collectively referred to as the opening, and studied in the backgammon opening theory. Backgammon opening theory is not developed in as much detail as opening theory in chess, which has been widely studied. This is because following the first move in backgammon, there are 21 dice roll outcomes on each subsequent move and many alternative plays for each outcome. Therefore, the tree of possible positions in backgammon expands rapidly; by the third roll there are about 25,000 different possibilities.

By the early 1980s a consensus had developed among backgammon experts on the preferred opening move for some rolls, with other rolls not attracting a consensus. Following the emergence of self-trained backgammon-playing neural networks, the suggested best opening moves for some rolls have changed significantly from the pre-bot expert opinions.

== Preferred opening moves ==
The table below summarizes the preferred moves for each of the 15 possible opening rolls, as selected by detailed computer simulations, referred to as "rollouts". The first column is the move that the rollout says gives the most equity (i.e. the average profit or loss that one would net, per game, by playing the position to conclusion an infinite number of times). When there is an alternative move that is close it is listed in column 2 (sometimes there is more than one).

The moves are expressed in standard backgammon notation. For instance, 8/5 means move a checker from the 8-point to the 5-point.

Backgammon opening position, board points numbered to register the movements of the black checkers

Roll	Preferred play	Close alternatives	
2-1	13/11 6/5	24/23 13/11	—
3-1	8/5 6/5	—	—
4-1	24/23 13/9	13/9 6/5	—
5-1	24/23 13/8	13/8 6/5	—
6-1	13/7 8/7	—	—
3-2	24/21 13/11	13/11 13/10	24/22 13/10
4-2	8/4 6/4	—	—
5-2	24/22 13/8	13/11 13/8	—
6-2	24/18 13/11	—	—
4-3	13/10 13/9	24/21 13/9	24/20 13/10
5-3	8/3 6/3	—	—
6-3	24/18 13/10	24/15	—
5-4	24/20 13/8	13/9 13/8	—
6-4	24/18 13/9	8/2 6/2	24/14
6-5	24/13	—	—

The above opening moves emerged from computer analysis and demonstrate that a number of opening moves that were favored by experts in the pre-bot era are now considered suboptimal. One example is the move 13/11 13/8 on the roll 5–2. Although not a bad move, the alternative choice preferred by the analyses, 24/22-13/8, is now generally agreed upon to be optimal. In other cases, computer analysis has resulted in alternative strategies that were not seriously considered in the past. For instance, the opening move 8/2 6/2 for a roll of 6-4 was in the past greeted with disdain from experts (making the 2-point instead of trying for a higher home point), but turns out to be on average about as effective as the usual plays (24/14 and 24/18 13/9). Another change from the pre-bot era is that slotting the five point with an opening roll of 4-1 or 5-1 is no longer considered best.

== Influencing factors ==
The opening moves above apply to money play, meaning that these plays optimise the expected payout with gammons counting double, etc. In match play the match score affects the checker play and one of the alternative plays may come out on top in computer simulations depending on the score. In a "gammon-go" situation the player does not care about whether they lose a single game or a gammon, but they have much to gain from winning a gammon; thus they can benefit from aggressive openings. The opposite may be true in "gammon-save" situations, where the player has little to lose from losing a single game, but much to lose from losing a gammon. At double-match-point (DMP) where the score is tied with each player needing one point to win, gammons do not matter for either player.

Another influencing factor is the preferred style of the player. A player might have a strong preference for one out of a number of alternative opening plays that are on average as effective, because the character of the move (passive or aggressive) better suits his or her playing style.

== Opening replies ==
While there are only 15 possible opening rolls, since some may be played several ways and doubles are possible on the second roll, there are over 600 replies to common opening rolls. The large number of possibilities precludes making a simple table as above.

Joe Dwek published the first list of opening replies in 1976. In the late 1990s Harald Johanni and Bill Robertie independently published the first lists based on computer rollouts with Robertie also providing some general principles:

1. Advance the back men.
2. Block your opponent's back men.
3. Prepare to block your opponent's back men.
4. Hit your opponent's men.
5. Unstack.
6. Create problems for your opponent.

In 2015 Jeremy Bagai published Mastering the Second Roll, a comprehensive analysis of 630 possible replies along with a set of rules to help aspiring players to remember the results. In 2021, Axel Reichert published a simpified version of Bagai's rules in Rough and Ready Rules for Rookies: The First Two Rolls

== See also ==
- World Backgammon Federation
