= Joe Russell (backgammon) =

Joseph Russell is a world class backgammon player from Memphis, Tennessee. He is a founding sponsor and the chairman of the board of directors of the U.S. Backgammon Federation. He organized and directed the first national collegiate backgammon championships on behalf of the U.S. Backgammon Federation. He was a teacher/coach for the UCLA backgammon team that won the national collegiate backgammon championship in 2011.

He is a former World Champion and Vice-World Champion. He was inducted into the Backgammon Hall of Fame in 2017. The backgammon titles he has won include:

- the Backgammon World Championship held in Monaco in 1989;
- the American Backgammon Tour Championship in 1995;
- the Rio Pro-Am of 1999, Doubles;
- the 2015 U.S. Open Backgammon Championship.
- captained the U.S.team to a first place finish in the World Internet Backgammon Federation's World Team Championship in 2019
