= Chouette =

Chouette is a French word meaning "owl", specifically owls without visible ear tufts. Owls with visible ear tufts are known as "Hibou".

Chouette may also mean "nice" in French.

Species of owl

- Chouette D'Ussher, the Rufous fishing owl (Scotopelia ussheri)

Uses relating to owls

- La chouette, a character portraying an owl in the opera L'enfant et les sortilèges by French composer Maurice Ravel
- "La chouette", a song by French composer Jeanne Herscher-Clément
- La chouette, a series of short CGI-animated episodes for children's television; see The Owl (TV series)
- La chouette aveugle, the original French name of The Blind Owl (film) of 1987
- La chouette d'or, a French treasure hunt created by Régis Hauser in 1993; see the Golden Owl quest
- "La chouette hulotte" (the tawny owl), a piece for solo piano in Catalogue d'oiseaux (1956–58) by French composer Olivier Messiaen
- Le cri de la chouette, an autobiographical novel of 1972 by Hervé Bazin
- Chouette, a novel of 2021 by Claire Oshetsky
- Girouette la chouette, a children's book of 2007 by Nicole Tourneur
- Quand la chouette s'envole, a 1979 publication of Alexandre Astruc

Other uses

- Backgammon chouette, a variant of the game of backgammon for three or more players
- Chouette Records, a US recording company
- Éditions Chouette / Chouette Publishing, based in Montreal, Canada, known for children's books featuring Caillou
- GPSO 92 Issy, nicknamed Les Chouettes
