= Backgammon notation =

Methods for describing backgammon moves and/or positions

Figure 1: checkers in starting position

Figure 2: after 4-2: 8/4 6/4

Backgammon notation is a means for recording backgammon games, developed by Paul Magriel in the 1970s. The common way of describing the movement of checkers involves numbering the points around the board from 24 to 1 as depicted in Figure 1.

The image shows the board from black's perspective, with the numbers diminishing as her checkers move counterclockwise toward her own home board at the bottom right-hand side. The reverse numbering of the points applies when white is on roll, with the 24-point referred to as the 1-point, and so forth.

Dice rolls are shown either as "4-2" or "42", denoting a roll of four on one die and two on the other. Moves are recorded using the notation:

4-2: 8/4 6/4

This denotes a roll of 4-2, and the corresponding checker moves from point 8 to 4 and from 6 to 4. After this move, the board will appear as shown in Figure 2.

If a move results in a checker being hit, this is indicated by adding an asterisk to the number denoting the point at which the checker was hit. For example, 13/7* denotes a checker moving from the 13-point and hitting an opposing checker at the 7-point. Similarly, 13/7*/5 denotes a move corresponding to a roll 6-2 and a checker moving from 13 to 5 hitting a checker at the in-between step at point 7.

Moves resulting from double rolls are often indicated by placing the number of checkers moved in parentheses after the move. For example, the effect of a roll 2-2, could be: 6/4(3) 13/11.

Finally, it is common to use the words "bar" and "off" to describe moves where checkers are entered from the bar or taken off during bear off. For instance bar/22 17/11, and 5/off 2/off.
