= Akiko Yazawa =

Japanese backgammon player (born 1980)

Akiko Yazawa (矢澤 亜希子, Yazawa Akiko) (née Abe, born 1980) is a professional backgammon player from Tokyo. She became World Backgammon champion in 2014 and 2018. Akiko is ranked 3rd on Giants of Backgammon in 2015, becoming the first female Backgammon Giant.
