= Backgammon chouette =

Type of backgammon

The backgammon chouette is a variant of backgammon for three or more players. Traditionally played in person, today, the internet allows this form of backgammon to be played across different countries and various platforms. The chouette is a fast-paced game, featuring frequent use of the doubling cube, discussion and dispute of possible moves, and shifting rivalries among players.

== General play ==
One player—the box—plays against a team consisting of all other participants. One member of the team is designated as the captain. The box and the rotation order are generally determined by the roll of dice.

The game is played on a single backgammon board according to standard rules. The captain makes the final decision on all checker plays for the team, although help from team-mates can be requested in some situations. Usually, all members of the team have their own doubling cube vs. the box, and can double regardless of what other team-mates do, and they can accept or refuse a double independently of the other players. The result is that, although they are using a single backgammon set, each member on the team is playing a separate game against the box.

A chouette is generally played in the same way as backgammon money play. There is no "match score"; one game is played, scores are tabulated, and another game begins. The positions of the players are rotated after each game. In general, if the box wins, this player remains the box. If the captain wins, the captain becomes the box for the next round. The loser goes to the bottom of the order and all other players move up one spot. In one variation, team members who successfully accepted or declined a double progress ahead of those who made the wrong decision.

Each player maintains a running score, corresponding to the number of points won or lost in each game, adjusted for gammons, backgammons, and the value of the doubling cube.

== See also ==
- World Backgammon Federation
