= EXtreme Gammon =

2009 backgammon software

eXtreme Gammon is backgammon software written by Xavier Dufaure de Citres and released in 2009. It is available for Microsoft Windows and mobile platforms.

According to the Financial Times, the program is the optimal backgammon player, and a study tool for competitive backgammon players.

== Performance rating ==
eXtreme Gammon provides a widely accepted benchmark number for players' skills called the Performance Rating or PR, with a lower number indicating a better rating. PR is the average equity lost per decision multiplied by 500. Only decisions not considered to be "obvious" are counted.

eXtreme Gammon Performance Ratings
PR	Description	Elo equivalent
0.0-2.5	World Champ	2162-2240
2.5-5.0	World Class	2077-2162
5.0-7.5	Expert	1986-2077
7.5-12.5	Advanced	1792-1986
12.5-17.5	Intermediate	1593-1792
17.5-22.5	Casual Player	1405-1593
22.5-30.0	Beginner	1167-1405
30.0 or more	Distracted	1167 or less
