= Rollout (backgammon) =

A rollout is an analysis technique for backgammon positions and moves. A rollout consists of playing the same position many times (with different dice rolls) and recording the results. The balance of wins and losses is used to evaluate the equity of the position. Historically this was done by hand, but it is now undertaken primarily by computer programs.

In order to compare two or more ways to move, rollouts can be performed from the positions after each move. Better choices will yield a more favorable position, and thus will win more times (and lose more rarely) in the end.

Computer programs usually play rollouts where the number of games is a multiple of 36, and ensure that the first dice roll is uniformly distributed. That is, 1/36 of the played games will start with a roll of 1-1, another 36th will start with 1-2, and so on. A common length for a rollout is 36x36 = 1296, in which each possible combination is used for the first two rolls. This improves the accuracy of the technique.

Rollouts depend on the availability of a good evaluator. If the computer makes mistakes in particular scenarios, the rollout results may be invalid. For example, if a computer AI's backgame strategy was weak, rollouts starting in a backgame position will skew the equity against the player who chose that strategy. When comparing moves, a weak backgame AI may favor less aggressive style. It is therefore not uncommon to see slightly different outcomes from rollouts done with different programs.

Nevertheless, rollouts whose results are consistently nonintuitive occur, and their results are usually accepted by most backgammon players. Modern backgammon opening theory is mostly based on rollouts.

== See also ==
- World Backgammon Federation
