= Luigi Villa =

Italian backgammon player

Luigi Villa is a backgammon player from Milan, Italy. In 1979, he was the winner of the World Championship held in Monte Carlo.

The very next day after winning the World Championship, he was defeated in a 7-point match by Hans Berliner's computer program BKG 9.8, becoming the first world champion in any board game to be defeated by a software program. Although Villa's play in the match was stronger, the computer received more favorable dice rolls, winning the match 7–1. The match was played for US$5,000, and drew an audience of 200 people.

In 2006, Villa placed second at the World Championship following a six-hour, 25-point final round against Philip Vischjager.
