= Mads Andersen (poker player) =

Danish poker and backgammon player (born 1970)

- Nickname: None
- Born: 1970 (age 55–56)

World Series of Poker
- Bracelet: None
- Money finishes: 5
- Highest WSOP Main Event finish: None

World Poker Tour
- Title: None
- Final table: 1
- Money finishes: 4

European Poker Tour
- Title: 1
- Final table: 1
- Money finishes: 2

Mads Andersen (born 1970) is a poker and backgammon player from Copenhagen, Denmark. As of June 2015, his total live tournament winnings exceed $1,225,000. and Heroscore ranks him as the 16th most influent Danish poker player.

Before making his mark in the poker world, Andersen won the 2002 World Backgammon Championships. Andersen won the European Poker Tour (EPT) second season Scandinavian Open where he outlasted the field to take home DKr 2,548,040. In the final hand, his A♦ Q♣ defeated Edgar Skjervold's A♠ 10♥ on a board of K♥ 4♥ 9♥ Q♦ 10♣.
