= Paul Magriel =

American backgammon and poker player (1946–2018)

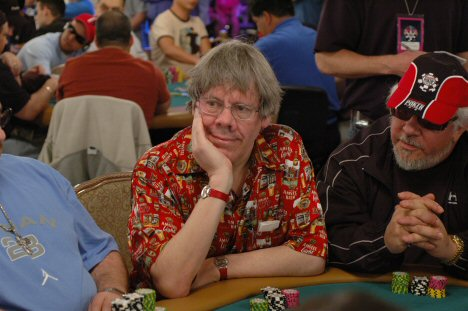
- Magriel in the 2005 World Series of Poker
- Nickname: X-22; Button
- Born: Paul David Magriel, Jr. July 1, 1946; Manhattan, New York, U.S.
- Died: March 5, 2018 (aged 71); Las Vegas, Nevada, U.S.

World Series of Poker
- Bracelet: None
- Money finishes: 8
- Highest WSOP Main Event finish: 683, 2010

World Poker Tour
- Title: None
- Final table: 1
- Money finishes: 2

Paul David Magriel Jr. (pronounced Ma-grill) (July 1, 1946 – March 5, 2018) was an American professional backgammon player, poker player, and author based in Las Vegas, Nevada.

Magriel became New York State Junior Chess Champion (January 1967) at the age of 20, while a student at New York University.

== Backgammon ==
Known as X-22 on the backgammon circuit, Magriel won among the most major backgammon tournaments. He was considered a premier teacher, theorist and one of its best players.

The sobriquet X-22 originates from Magriel's simulation of a real backgammon tournament (compare simultaneous exhibition in chess) with 64 boards, designated X-1 through X-64, in which the player designated "X-22" has eventually won.

Magriel became a major figure on the backgammon circuit when he won the World Backgammon Championship in 1978. From 1977 to 1980, he wrote weekly backgammon columns for The New York Times.

Paul and Renée Magriel (his first wife, later Roberts) wrote two books, Backgammon, widely considered to be the bible of the game, and an abridgement for beginning players, An Introduction to Backgammon: A Step-by-Step Guide.

Magriel was featured in the commentary in the televised backgammon series, High Stakes Backgammon, produced from the 2005 World Backgammon Championships held in Monte Carlo. It was the pilot series that led to the World Series of Backgammon and showcased Magriel's oratory skills.

== Poker ==
Magriel had several notable finishes in poker tournaments from the mid-1990s in Europe, playing in London, Paris and Vienna in Omaha, hold'em and seven-card stud events. He won the €2,000 no limit hold'em event at the Aviation Club de France in September 2002, defeating a field including Pascal "Triple P" Perrault, Patrick Bruel and Simon "Aces" Trumper on the way to the €48,600 first prize.

In March 2003, he made his first World Poker Tour (WPT) final table, finishing 4th in the $5,000 no limit hold'em World Poker Challenge event in Reno.

Magriel finished in the money eight times at the World Series of Poker (WSOP), which includes one cash in the Main Event in 2010, he has also made the final table on the Professional Poker Tour and Ultimate Poker Challenge.

Magriel created the "M Principle" (better known since as the M-ratio) - a theory elaborated on at great length in the book Harrington on Hold'em Volume II by former WSOP Champion "Action" Dan Harrington and Bill Robertie. The theory explains at which stages of tournaments expected value exists to make moves on other players, depending on the ratio between chip stack sizes and antes.

While playing poker, Magriel often shouted "Quack quack!" while making a bet, usually to declare a bet which had a numerical value beginning in 22 (e.g.: 2200, 22000.) This is a reference to his nickname, X-22, since a pair of 2's are known in backgammon as "double ducks", poker as ducks, and bingo as "two little ducks" (to which the canonical response is, likewise, "Quack, quack!").

His total live poker tournament winnings exceed $520,000.

== Family and miscellaneous ==
Magriel was the son of Paul David Magriel, Sr. (1906–1990), an immigrant from Latvia who served as the librarian of the School of American Ballet and as the curator of dance archives at the Museum of Modern Art before pursuing his avocations as an author and art collector, and Christine Fairchild Magriel, an architect. His younger half-brother is the sarangi player and teacher Nicolas Magriel. He has one son, Louis Fairchild Magriel (Louis being the name of all four grandfathers) by his third ex-wife, French poker player Martine Oulés.

After graduating from Phillips Exeter Academy and receiving perfect College Board scores, he became, while an undergraduate, a fellow of the Courant Institute at New York University, where he earned his bachelor's degree in mathematics in 1967. He then enrolled in Princeton University's mathematics doctoral program (with a primary interest in probability) as a National Science Foundation fellow in September 1967 but did not take a degree, ultimately dropping out after one semester. Thereafter, he taught mathematics at the Newark College of Engineering (now the New Jersey Institute of Technology) from 1969 to 1973.
