= V. H. Hagopian =

V. Hovhannes Hagopian was an Armenian professor of Ottoman Turkish and Persian at Anatolia College in Merzifon. He was the author of Ottoman-Turkish Conversation-Grammar, published in Heidelberg in 1907.

Hagopian was deported, probably to his death, from Anatolia College on 10 August 1915 during the Armenian genocide.
