= World Backgammon Championship =

Annual international backgammon tournament

- Sport: Backgammon
- Founded: 1967
- Region: International
- Most recent champion: Petko Kostadinov
- Most titles: Tim Holland, Jörgen Granstedt(3 titles each)
- Website: https://www.backgammonworldchampionship.com/

The World Backgammon Championship is the most prestigious annual competition in backgammon. It was first held in 1967 in Las Vegas, United States. Since 1979, the championship has been held in Fairmont Monte Carlo Monte Carlo, Monaco, where it became the universally recognised world championship event for the sport.

The World Backgammon Federation (WBGF) also holds an annual world championship event in rotating cities (see below).

== Overview ==
The tournament attracts several hundred players from around the world and includes multiple divisions, including championship, intermediate and beginner events. In addition to the open championship, women's, doubles and team competitions are also organised in connection with the event.

The early editions of the championship were held in Las Vegas from 1967 to 1975. Between 1975 and 1978, another major world championship event was held in the Bahamas, while Monte Carlo hosted the European Open Championship. In 1979, the two competing circuits were merged into a single world championship in Monte Carlo.

The Monte Carlo championship is typically played over one week and includes knockout rounds, consolation events and last-chance brackets. Main championship matches are usually played to a fixed number of points, with later rounds and finals played over longer formats.

== History ==
The first recognised world championship in backgammon was held in Las Vegas in 1967, with Tim Holland becoming the inaugural champion. Holland also won the 1968 and 1971 editions. There was no championship in 1969 or 1970.

From 1975 to 1978, the Bahamas hosted the American-based world championship, while Monte Carlo staged the European Open Championship. In 1979, promoter Lewis Deyong proposed combining the two events, leading to Monte Carlo becoming the permanent host of the World Backgammon Championship.

By the 21st century, the World Backgammon Championship had become one of the leading events on the international backgammon circuit.

== List of champions ==
The following is a list of world backgammon champions.

Year	Open Champion	Female Champion	Tournament Location
1967	(United States) Tim Holland		Las Vegas
1968	(United States) Tim Holland		Las Vegas
1969	no championship		
1970	no championship		
1971	(United States) Tim Holland		Las Vegas
1972	(United States) Oswald Jacoby		Las Vegas
1973	(United States) Carol Crawford		Las Vegas
1974	(United States) Claude Beer		Las Vegas
1975	(United States) Billy Eisenberg		Bahamas
1976	(United States) Baron Vernon Ball		Bahamas
1977	(United States) Ken Goodman		Bahamas
1978	(United States) Paul Magriel		Bahamas
1979	(Italy) Luigi Villa		Monte Carlo
1980	(Mexico) Walter Coratella		Monte Carlo
1981	(United States) Lee Genud		Monte Carlo
1982	(Switzerland) Jacques Michel		Monte Carlo
1983	(United States) Bill Robertie		Monte Carlo
1984	(United States) Mike Svobodny		Monte Carlo
1985	(Switzerland) Charles-Henri Sabet		Monte Carlo
1986	(Italy) Clement Palacci		Monte Carlo
1987	(United States) Bill Robertie		Monte Carlo
1988	(Germany) Phillip Marmorstein		Monte Carlo
1989	(United States) Joe Russell		Monte Carlo
1990	(Canada) Hal Heinrich		Monte Carlo
1991	(Germany) Michael Meyburg		Monte Carlo
1992	(Switzerland) Ion Ressu		Monte Carlo
1993	(Denmark) Peter Jes Thomsen		Monte Carlo
1994	(United States) Frank Frigo		Monte Carlo
1995	(Israel) David Ben-Zion		Monte Carlo
1996	(Lebanon) David Nahmad		Monte Carlo
1997	(Sweden) Jerry Grandell		Monte Carlo
1998	(Germany) Michael Meyburg		Monte Carlo
1999	(Sweden) Jörgen Granstedt		Monte Carlo
2000	(United States) Katie Scalamandre		Monte Carlo
2001	(Sweden) Jörgen Granstedt		Monte Carlo
2002	(Denmark) Mads Andersen		Monte Carlo
2003	(Norway) Jon Kristian Røyset		Monte Carlo
2004	(Denmark) Peter Hallberg		Monte Carlo
2005	(United States) Dennis Carlston		Monte Carlo
2006	(Netherlands) Philip Vischjager		Monte Carlo
2007	(Argentina) Jorge Pan		Monte Carlo
2008	(Denmark) Lars Trabolt	(France) Scarlett Serrero	Monte Carlo
2009	(Japan) Masayuki Mochizuki	(Sweden) Sara Utku	Monte Carlo
2010	(Denmark) Lars Bentzon	(England) Zoe Cunningham	Monte Carlo
2011	(Japan) Takumitsu Suzuki	(United States) Lynn Ehrlich	Monte Carlo
2012	(Denmark) Nevzat Dogan	(Italy) Laura Monaco	Monte Carlo
2013	(Ukraine) Vyacheslav Pryadkin	(Italy) Laura Monaco	Monte Carlo
2014	(Japan) Akiko Yazawa	(Italy) Laura Monaco	Monte Carlo
2015	(Turkey) Ali Cihangir Çetinel	(Italy) Laura Monaco	Monte Carlo
2016	(Sweden) Jörgen Granstedt	(England) Cecilia Sparke	Monte Carlo
2017	(France) Didier Assaraf	(England) Anna Clarke	Monte Carlo
2018	(Japan) Akiko Yazawa	(Romania) Alexandra Knupfer	Monte Carlo
2019	(Israel) Eli Roymi	(United States) Antoinette Williams	Monte Carlo
2020	no championship		
2021	(Japan) Masayuki Mochizuki	(Italy) Annalisa Agosti	Monte Carlo
2022	(Denmark) Sander Lylloff	(Italy) Annalisa Agosti	Monte Carlo
2023	(United States) Frank Frigo	(Greece) Maggie Diamantidis	Monte Carlo
2024	(Sweden) Johan Moazed	(Japan) Miho Macleod	Monte Carlo
2025	(Finland) Timo Väätäinen	(United Kingdom) Miranda Moulton	Monte Carlo
2026	(United States) Petko Kostadinov	(United States) Martha Ghio	Monte Carlo

== List of WBGF champions ==
The World Backgammon Federation hosts the Individual World Championship, held alongside the World Team Championship, in a different city every year. The winner of this tournament is also referred to as World Champion.

Year	Open Champion	Team Champion	Tournament Location
2017	(Georgia (country)) Nodar Gagua	Norway	Reykjavik
2018	(Germany) Tobias Hellwag	Germany	Gibraltar
2019	(Georgia (country)) Bakar Matikashvili	Germany	Budva
2020	(Germany) Ralph Jonas	Denmark	Forges-les-Eaux
2021	(France) Stéphane Chenevière	Romania	Trier
2022	(Switzerland) Patrick Didisheim	Italy	Venice
2023	(United States) David Klausa	France	Skopje
2024	(Netherlands) Peter van Rooij	Austria	Stockholm
2025	(Sweden) Mikael Westerlund	Sweden	Kamena Vourla
2026	(Denmark) Frederik Mikkelsen	Netherlands	London

== See also ==
- Computer Olympiad - Backgammon
- List of world championships in mind sports
- PartyGammon Million
- European Backgammon Championship
- American Backgammon Tour
- Giants of Backgammon
- Nordic Backgammon Open
