= Afif Bahnassi =

Syrian art historian, museum director and academic

- عفيف البهنسي
- Born: April 17, 1928; Damascus, Syria
- Died: November 2, 2017 (aged 89)
- Education: University of Damascus; University of Paris (Sorbonne)
- Occupations: Art historian Professor; Museum director
- Known for: Pioneer of Arab and Islamic art history
- Notable work: Aesthetics of Arab Art (1979); Islamic Art (1968); Architecture Through History (1987)
- Spouse: Maysoun AlJazairi
- Awards: Orders of merit from Italy, France, Germany, Belgium, Poland, Denmark, Yemen, Syria

Afif Bahnassi (Arabic: عفيف البهنسي; 17 April 1928 – 2 November 2017) was a Syrian art historian, museum director and academic, regarded as one of the founders of modern Arab and Islamic art history. He served as Director of Fine Arts in the Syrian Ministry of Culture from 1962 to 1971 and as Director-General of Antiquities and Museums from 1971 to 1989. He authored more than seventy-five books on art history, aesthetics, and Islamic architecture, and was a professor at the University of Damascus for over five decades.

== Early life and education ==
Bahnassi was born in Damascus, Syria, on 17 April 1928, in the Al-Shuhada (Al-Sabki) district. He earned a teacher’s college certificate and a degree in law with a diploma in administrative sciences from the University of Damascus in 1950. He later studied fine arts under André Lhote and art history at the École du Louvre in Paris. In 1964 he received a PhD in art history from the Sorbonne, followed by a Doctorat d’État in the philosophy of art in 1978, both with highest distinction. He was married to Maysoun Al Jazairi, and has 5 children: Ayad, Anas, Yola, Kinan, and Omar Bahnassi.

== Career ==
=== Academic and government service ===
From 1962 to 1971 Bahnassi served as the first Director of Fine Arts in the Syrian Ministry of Culture, establishing the Department of Fine Arts and supporting the creation of the Faculty of Fine Arts at the University of Damascus. He was appointed Director-General of Antiquities and Museums in 1971, a post he held until 1989, overseeing heritage policy, restoration, and museum development throughout Syria. He also taught art and architectural history at the University of Damascus, where he was a long-time professor in the Faculties of Fine Arts, Architecture, and Arts and Humanities.

=== Institution-building ===
Bahnassi founded or helped establish several cultural and academic institutions, including:

- the Faculty of Fine Arts (1960)
- national Centres of Fine and Applied Arts in Damascus, Aleppo, Homs and Hama
- the Institute of Applied Arts and the Institute of Archaeology and Museums in the Damascus Citadel
- the Syndicate of Fine Arts (1969), where he served as first president
- the Friends of Damascus Association (1973)

Between the 1960s and 1980s he supervised the creation or renovation of more than seventeen museums, among them the National Museum of Damascus, the Aleppo Museum of Modern Art, and regional museums in Raqqa, Deir ez-Zor, Suwayda, Hama, Lattakia, and Bosra. He also oversaw the design of national memorials including the Martyrs’ Memorial and the October War Panorama in Damascus.

=== International teaching and lectures ===
Bahnassi lectured at universities and cultural centres across the Middle East, Europe, the Americas, and Asia. His lectures included visits to Harvard University, MIT, UCLA, Cambridge, Oxford, University of Paris (Sorbonne), University of Rome, the University of Tokyo, the American University of Sharjah, and others.

== Editorial and media work ==
From 1971 to 1988 he was Editor-in-Chief of the Annals of Syrian Archaeology and Art. He also sat on the editorial board of Moukaruas (Aga Khan Foundation, Boston) and was honorary editor of Art (London) and L’Œil (Switzerland). Between 1960 and 1988 he produced and presented cultural radio and television programmes such as *Syria Today* and *Art and Culture* for Syrian Radio and TV.

== Artistic work ==
Trained under André Lhote, Bahnassi produced paintings and bronze sculptures, exhibiting nationally and internationally. His public sculptures in Damascus include representations of al-Jahiz, al-Farabi, Ibn Sina, Ibn al-Nafis, al-Kindi, Zaki al-Arsuzi, and Queen Zenobia. He designed official emblems for cultural institutions such as the Supreme Council for Science, the City of Damascus, the Fine Arts Syndicate, and Syrian Radio and Television, and contributed to the design of postage stamps (1960–1983) and banknotes (1973–1999).

== Publications ==
Bahnassi authored more than seventy-five books and numerous scholarly articles in Arabic, English, French, and Italian. His writings cover art theory, Islamic architecture, aesthetics, and Syrian heritage. Selected works include:

=== In Arabic ===
- Art Through History (1960)
- Islamic Art (1968)
- Aesthetics of Arab Art – World of Knowledge series no. 14 (Kuwait, 1979)
- Modern Art in the Arab Countries (UNESCO, Tunis, 1979)
- Architecture Through History (Damascus, 1987)
- The Great Umayyad Mosque of Damascus (Damascus, 1988)
- Arab–Islamic Architecture: Aesthetics, Unity and Diversity (Rabat – Rome, 1991)
- Museology and Exhibition Science (Damascus, 2004)
- Critique of Modernity (Damascus, 2009)
- History of Jerusalem (Damascus, 2010)

=== In other languages ===
- Art of Islam (Flammarion / UNESCO, Paris, 1991)
- Dictionary of Art and Architecture (Beirut, 1994)
- Dictionary of Calligraphy and Calligraphers (Beirut, 1995)
- Ancient Art of Syria (Leipzig, 1987)
- Philosophy of Arabic Architecture (Rabat – Rome, 1992)
- Modern Art and the Orient (Damascus, 2002)
- The Pioneers of Modern Arab Art (Beirut, 1985)
- Damascus: History and Civilization (Ministry of Tourism, Syria, 2001; 8 vols.)

== Honours ==
Bahnassi received numerous national and international decorations for cultural and scientific merit, including:

- Italian Order of Merit (Knight, 1964)
- French Order of Culture (Commander, 1967)
- German Order of Distinction (Commander, 1977)
- French Order of Honor (Commander, 1984)
- Polish, Danish and Belgian Orders of Honor (Commander, 1985–1987)
- Sash of Culture and Arts, First Class (Republic of Yemen, 1998)

He also received the Gold Medal of Fine Arts (Syria, 1963), a Gold Medal from King Fahd of Saudi Arabia (1987), and the First Prize in Islamic Art from the Organisation of Islamic Capitals and Cities (1991).

== Legacy ==
Bahnassi is widely regarded as one of the most influential Arab scholars of art history in the twentieth century. Through his leadership in museums, education, and scholarship, he helped shape the intellectual and institutional framework for studying Arab-Islamic art and architecture. His works continue to be cited in UNESCO publications and Arabic art curricula.

== See also ==
- Islamic art
- Arab art
- Museum studies
- Cultural heritage of Syria
