= Tim Holland (backgammon) =

American backgammon player (1931–2010)

Tim Holland (March 3, 1931 – March 10, 2010) was a world-champion backgammon player, highly paid teacher of the game, author of four backgammon books and successful gambler who won more major backgammon tournaments than almost anyone in history.

== Early years ==
Simeon Harold Holland was born in Rockville Centre, New York, the only child of Simeon and Inez Holland. He learned to play bridge and golf very young and won a father-son and a mother-son golf tournament when he was seven. He was an outstanding player on his high school golf team, and golf became his preoccupation for the next twenty years. After graduating from South Side High School in 1948, he enrolled at Lehigh University, but transferred to Adelphi University after six months. The following year, he decided that Florida was the best place to play golf, so he transferred to the University of Miami. During his college years, he played a lot of golf and won most of his wagers, but still managed to graduate with a degree in business administration in 1952. He studied at the UM Law School for two years, but did not graduate.

In the mid-1950s, Holland considered playing golf professionally, but the prize money at most tournaments was small—typically only $5,000. Most pros were in their late 30s or 40's, and the golf association discouraged gambling, so he abandoned the idea. At the time, the La Gorce Country Club in Miami Beach had over one hundred millionaire members and was, according to Holland, the "gambling capital of golf". For several years, he made his living playing golf for high stakes, but in 1958, he noticed several older members playing a board game in the clubhouse. He asked to play and got hooked on backgammon. It took several years and $30,000 in losses to achieve a mastery of the game, but once he did, Holland was dominant.

== Resurgence of game ==
Beginning in the mid-1960s, the popularity of Backgammon surged, in part due to the charisma of Prince Alexis Obolensky, who was known as “The Father of Modern Backgammon”. "Obe", as he was called by friends, co-founded the International Backgammon Association, which published a set of official rules. He also established the World Backgammon Club of Manhattan, devised a backgammon tournament system in 1963, and then organized the first major international Backgammon tournament in March 1964, which attracted royalty, celebrities, and the paparazzi. The game became a huge fad and was played on college campuses, in discothèques, and at country clubs; stockbrokers and bankers began playing at conservative men's clubs. Cigarette, liquor and car companies began to sponsor tournaments and Hugh Hefner held backgammon parties at the Playboy Mansion.

== Player ==
Tim Holland was a striking figure at 6 ft 3 in (191 cm) tall and always well-dressed. He was supremely self-confident that his skill would prevail, and when he played, he completely focused on the game. He kept a poker face and did not converse with his opponent but was a chain-smoker. Tim Holland was club Backgammon champion at the Regency Whist Club before he won the first World Backgammon Championship in 1968 and held the world title until 1973. No championships were held in the years 1970 and 1971. He won the International Championship of Backgammon, played in London, England, in 1966, 1972 and 1973. During the early 1970s, Holland averaged $60,000 (~$400,000 in 2020 money) per year in prize money from backgammon tournaments, not including his personal wagering.

== Writer ==
Following his championships, he was much in demand to teach game strategy. He wrote his first book, Beginning Backgammon, in 1973. Holland followed it up with a volume for intermediate players, titled Better Backgammon, in 1974, and his final volume was 1977's Backgammon for People who Hate to Lose, which addresses the psychological aspects of the game. He also created a teaching aid for the game, Autobackgammon.

== Clubs ==
The Park 65 Backgammon Club opened in 1978 with Tim Holland as president. Park 65, as well as most other backgammon clubs, closed or shifted to card games towards the end of the twentieth century as backgammon's popularity again faded. Tim Holland returned to the game of bridge which he learned as a child, and played professionally until his death.

== Personal life ==
Tim Holland was divorced four or five times, according to his daughter. Models Joanna Ulrich and Simone Terweij were two of his former spouses. He fathered two children: his son, Joe, predeceased him; his daughter, Vanessa, is the mother of one granddaughter, Stephanie. Holland's last marriage was to Nancy Zorn in 1982, and they were still married at the time of his death 28 years later.

== Death ==
Tim Holland died on March 10, 2010, of emphysema at his home in West Palm Beach, Florida.

== See also ==
- List of world backgammon champions
