= World Series of Backgammon =

World Series of Backgammon (WSOB) is a major televised live tour. The television shows capture the match action, jeopardy and background around some of the world’s largest backgammon tournaments, and have broadcast throughout Europe on Eurosport 1 and 2 whilst being distributed worldwide by ESPN International.

In May 2010, World Series of Backgammon launched it first online tour, the WSOB Online Tour on its own online backgammon and poker platform, PlayWSOB.com. PlayWSOB also offers qualifiers for major offline events including the 2010 World Backgammon Championships as well as free play and cash games.

== About WSOB ==
World Series of Backgammon ("WSOB") is a televised, high-stakes backgammon tour created in 2006 by television producers and backgammon players, Andy Bell and Scotty Gelt.

Season I launched in 2006 with an 8-hour television series presented by Kara Scott and John Clark broadcast on Eurosport 2 in 44 European countries capturing the Riviera Cup and team event, the Nations Cup from the Palm Casino, Cannes. Sean Casey of Ireland triumphed in the Riviera Cup against Georgia's Nodar Gagua and USA defeated Denmark in the Nations Cup.

Season II, 2008, expanded to events in London - the UK Masters saw a 128 draw in the main event, the largest backgammon event held in the UK for 30 years; the world's largest event, the Nordic Open joined the WSOB tour for the first time and saw the Championship field increase from 78 to 153 players and finally on the 08 tour, WSOB Cannes, which recorded 155 Championship players, second only to the World Championships. The television series expanded to 15 hours and saw superstar poker and backgammon player Gus Hansen join John Clark in the commentary box. New Yorker Jessie Cantrell hosted with further contributions from experts Sander Lylloff, Falafel Natanzon and Morten Holm.

2008 also saw the introduction of WSOB's own 'final table', the €160,000 WSOB Championship which rewarded the best players from the tour and Super Satellite winners with €10,000 value seats to the 16 players finale. Frenchman Frederic Andrieu won the Gold Cube and the €100,000 champion's cheque. More than €500,000 in prize money was won on the second season.

2009 sees the WSOB tour re-format its schedule. WSOB events in Cannes, Prague and London to be followed by the 2009 WSOB Championship, where up to €320,000 will be won from a 32 player draw.

== Online qualification ==
In 2008, the online backgammon site Play65 ran three online qualifiers for the WSOB final table at Cannes aka WSOB Championship. Since 2009, WSOB offers the possibility of qualifying online to the WSOB Tour.

In July 2009, World Series of Backgammon launched a shared platform with Dicearena.com offering satellites for its events in Prague and London.

In January 2010, WSOB offered satellites to its $480,000 guaranteed WSOB Championship, aka the 'Shootout' which saw the best players from the 2009 tour and a number of buy-ins at $7,500, compete for the second largest prize pool in the history of the game. The event was played by many of the best players in the world including Gus Hansen who bought into the Round of 16 for US$30,000.

In May 2010, World Series of Backgammon ended its agreement with Dicearena and launched its own online backgammon and poker platform, PlayWSOB.com licensing technology from Melita Gaming Network, who also supply to TrueMoneygames and several other poker brands.

== WSOB online TV channel ==
In April 2010 WSOB launched its own online TV channel using the Vimeo video platform showing full-length shows from its archive of match-play television coverage.

In October 2011 World Series of Backgammon announced a partnership with the largest online gaming operator in the world, Bwin.com, for online backgammon creating bwin.com/wsob to provide an online tour with a lower buy-in to attract all levels of players. The new tour mimics the major live tournaments run by WSOB and includes a series of events, a points race and the WSOB Championship. The WSOB Champion wins the Gold Cube and an official backgammon board made by Geoffrey Parker Games and worth apparently €2400.

== See also ==
- World Backgammon Championship
- PartyGammon Million
- European Backgammon Championship
- American Backgammon Tour
- Giants of Backgammon
- Nordic Backgammon Open
