= World Backgammon Federation =

International sport governing body

- Location: Schwaz, Austria
- Region served: Worldwide
- President: Bernhard Mayr
- Website: wbgf.info
- Formerly called: European Backgammon Federation

The World Backgammon Federation (WBGF), formerly the European Backgammon Federation (EUBGF) until 2018, is the international body established to support and promote the table game of backgammon worldwide.

Their functions include the regulation of competition rules worldwide, the assessment and ranking of players and the establishment of regional governing bodies, and hosting tournaments internationally. Among their objectives is the legal recognition of backgammon as a mind sport at national and international levels.

According to their website their objectives consist of developing, improving, expanding, and promoting backgammon worldwide, uniting member federations and strengthening international cooperation, organizing and regulating global competitions, safeguarding the interests of members and represent them internationally, building common systems for rules, rankings and ethics, encouraging new national federations where none exist, upholding fair play, respect, and non discrimination in sports.

The WBGF is based in Schwaz, Austria.

== Member Nations ==
As of 2026 WBGF has over 40 member nations. WBGF has member nations from Europe, Americas, Asia Pacific, Middle East and Africa. Some of these member nations include Austria, Argentina, UAE, Turkiye, UK and Japan.

WBGF and WBGF's member nations both host tournaments. The tournaments hosted by WBGF's member nations can be local or international. These tournaments are hosted under WBGF's statutes. WBGF's most prestigious tournaments as of 2026 are the WBGF World Teams Championship, WBGF World Women's Team Championship and WBGF World Individual Championship.

== WBGF Executive Board ==
As of 2026 the WBGF's Executive Board consists of Bernhard Mayr from Austria as the President, Joe Russell from USA as the Vice-President, Masayuki “Mochy” Mochizuki from Japan and Karen Davis from USA as Honorary President(s), Ata Bulut Bostan from Turkiye as Secretary-General, Arda Fındıkoğlu from Turkiye as Tournament Director, Julie Thabault from France as Treasurer, Raj Jansari from UK as Lawyer, Christian Klebajn from Denmark, Patrick Gebeili from UAE, Fernando Neumark from Argentina, Michail Proukakis from Greece as board members.

According to the statutes board members are elected and elections are made in General Assemblies of the World Backgammon Federation.

== See also ==
- List of world backgammon champions
- Worldwide Backgammon Federation (WBF) was founded in 1986
