= Backgammon =

Board and dice game for two players

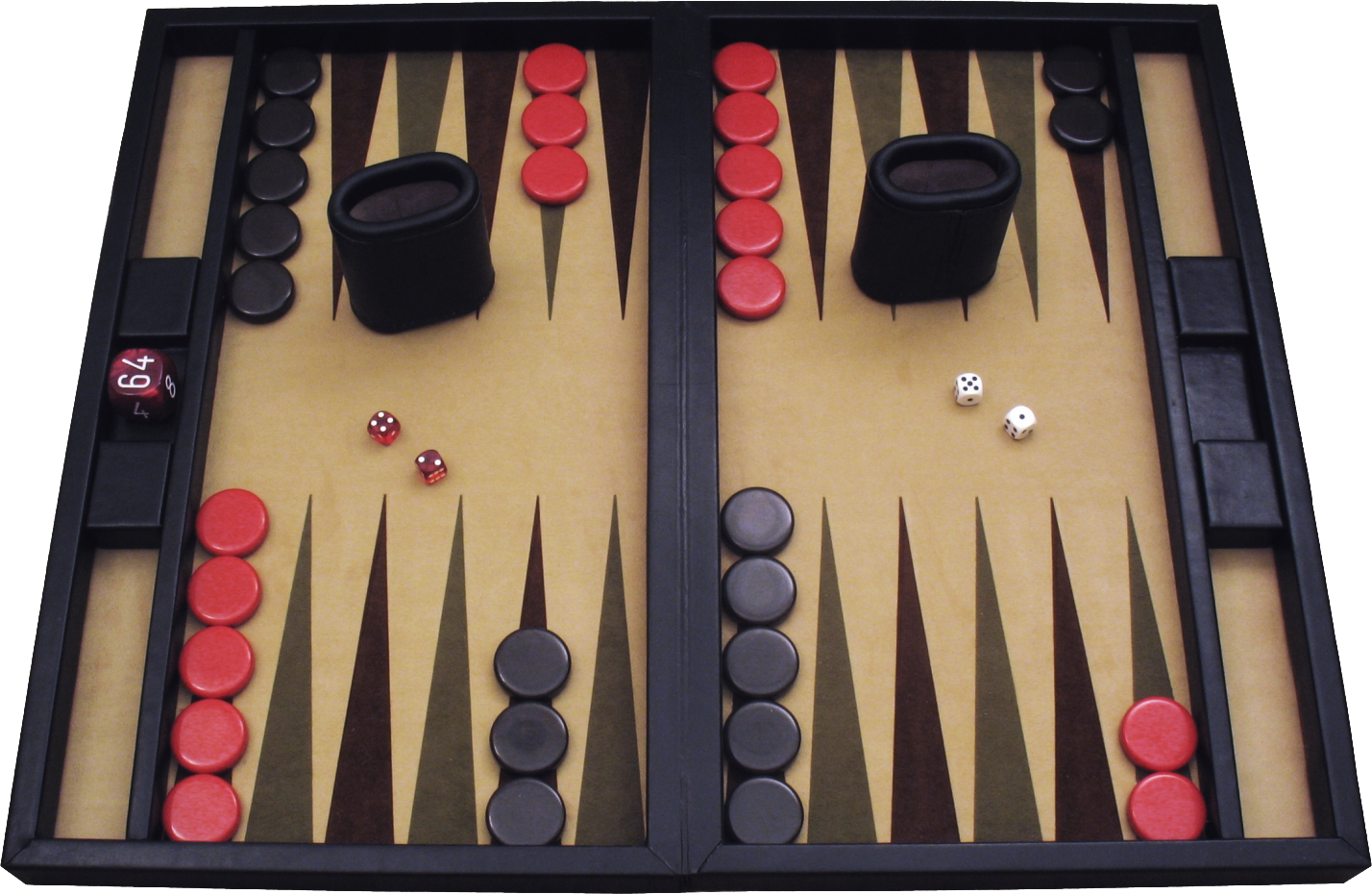
- A backgammon set
- Years active: 1646 to present
- Genres: Board game; tables game; race game; dice game
- Players: 2
- Movement: Contrary
- Setup time: 10–30 seconds
- Playing time: 5–60 minutes
- Chance: Medium (dice rolling)
- Skills: Strategy; tactics; counting; probability

Related games
- Irish, Nard
- Origin: 17th-century England; Descended from: Irish

Backgammon is a two-player board game played with counters and dice on tables boards. It is the most widespread Western member of the large family of tables games, whose ancestors date back at least 1,600 years. The earliest record of backgammon itself dates to 17th-century England, being descended from the 16th-century game of Irish.

Backgammon is a two-player game of contrary movement in which each player has 15 pieces known traditionally as men (short for "tablemen"), but increasingly known as "checkers" in the United States in recent decades. The backgammon table pieces move along 24 "points" according to the roll of two dice. The objective of the game is to move the 15 pieces around the board and be first to bear off, i.e., remove them from the board. The achievement of this while the opponent is still a long way behind results in a triple win known as a backgammon, hence the name of the game.

Backgammon involves a combination of strategy and luck from rolling of the dice. While the dice may determine the outcome of a single game, the better player will accumulate the better record over a series of many games. With each roll of the dice, players must choose from numerous options for moving their pieces and anticipate possible counter-moves by the opponent. The optional use of a doubling cube allows players to raise the stakes during the game.

== History ==
The earliest specific reference to backgammon was in a letter from 1647, when it was emerging as a variant of the popular medieval Anglo-Scottish game of Irish; the latter was described as a more complicated game. By the 19th century, however, backgammon had spread to Europe, where it rapidly superseded other tables games like Trictrac in popularity, and also to America, where the doubling cube was introduced. In other parts of the world, different tables games such as Nard or Nardy are better known.

=== Tables games ===
Backgammon is a recent member of the large family of tables games that date back to ancient times. Its equipment is similar or identical to earlier tables games that have been depicted for centuries in art, leading to the mistaken belief that backgammon itself is much older.

==== Ancient history ====
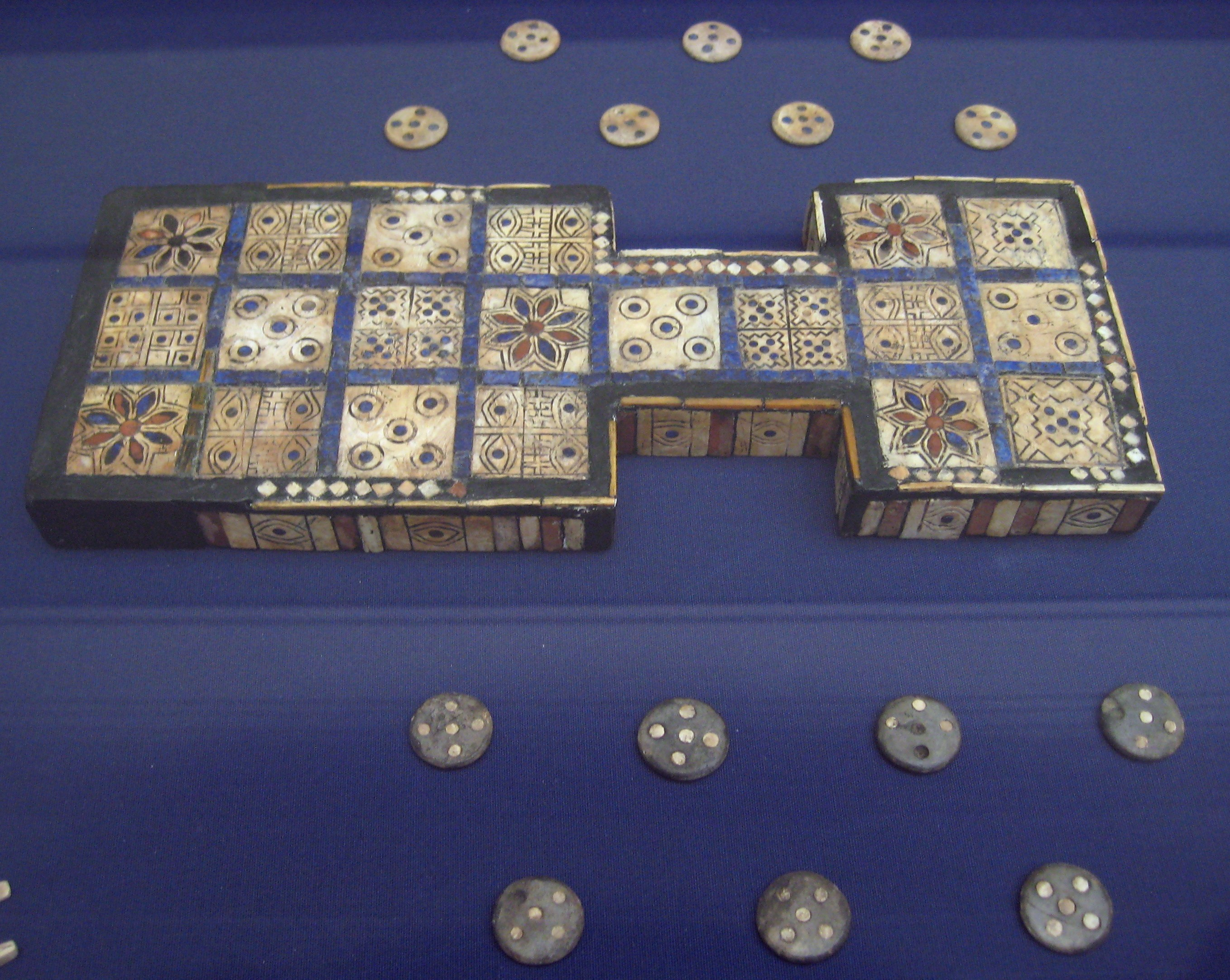
One of the gameboards found by Sir Leonard Woolley in the Royal Cemetery at Ur (British Museum)

The history of board games can be traced back nearly 5,000 years to archaeological discoveries of the Jiroft culture, in Iran, the world's oldest game set having been discovered in the region with equipment comprising a dumbbell-shaped board, counters and dice. Although its precise rules are unknown, it has been termed the Game of 20 Squares and Irving Finkel has suggested a possible reconstruction. The Royal Game of Ur from 2600 BC may also be an ancestor or intermediate of modern-day table games like backgammon and is the oldest game for which rules have been handed down. It used tetrahedral dice. Various other board games spanning the 10th to 7th centuries BC have been found throughout modern day Iraq, Syria, Egypt and western Iran.

==== Sasanian Empire (Ancient Persia/Iran) ====
The Persian tables game of nard or nardšir emerged somewhere between the 3rd and 6th century AD, one text (Kār-nāmag ī Ardaxšēr ī Pāpakān) linking it with Ardashir I (r. 224–41), founder of the Sasanian dynasty, whereas another (Wičārišn ī čatrang ud nihišn ī nēw-ardaxšēr) attributes it to Bozorgmehr Bokhtagan, the Vizier of Khosrow (r. 531–79), who is credited with the invention of the game.

==== Roman and Byzantine Empires ====
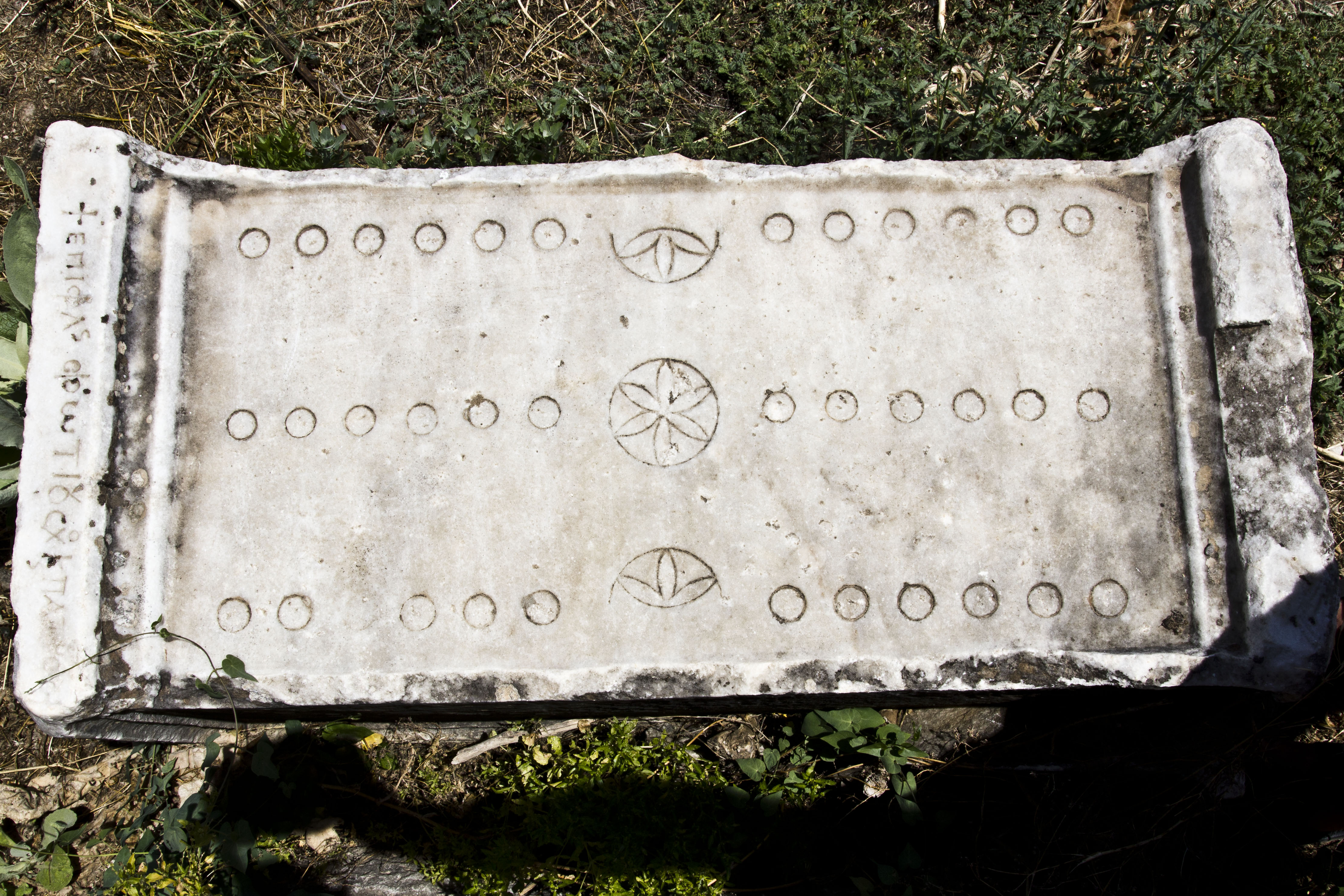
Roman Ludus duodecim scriptorum board from the 2nd century, Aphrodisias

The earliest identifiable tables game, Tabula, meaning 'table' or 'board', is described in an epigram of Byzantine Emperor Zeno (AD 476–491). The overall aim was to be first to bear one's pieces off; the board had the typical tables layout, with 24 points, 12 on each side; and there were 15 counters per player. However, unlike modern Western backgammon, there were three cubical dice not two, no bar nor doubling die, and all counters started off the board. Modern backgammon follows the same rules as tabula for hitting a blot and for bearing off; and the rules for re-entering pieces in backgammon are the same as those for initially entering pieces in tabula. The name Tavli (τάβλι) is still used in Greece for various tables games, which are frequently played in town plateias and cafes.

The τάβλι of Emperor Zeno's time is believed to be a direct descendant of the earlier Roman ludus duodecim scriptorum ('Game of twelve lines') with the board's middle row of points removed, and only the two outer rows remaining. Ludus duodecim scriptorum used a board with three rows of 12 points each, with the 15 pieces being moved in opposing directions by the two players across three rows according to the roll of the three cubical dice. Little specific text about the gameplay of Ludus duodecim scriptorum has survived; it may have been related to the older Ancient Greek dice game Kubeia. The earliest known mention of the game is in Ovid's Ars Amatoria ('The Art of Love'), written between 1 BC and 8 AD. In Roman times, this game was also known as alea.

==== Western Europe ====
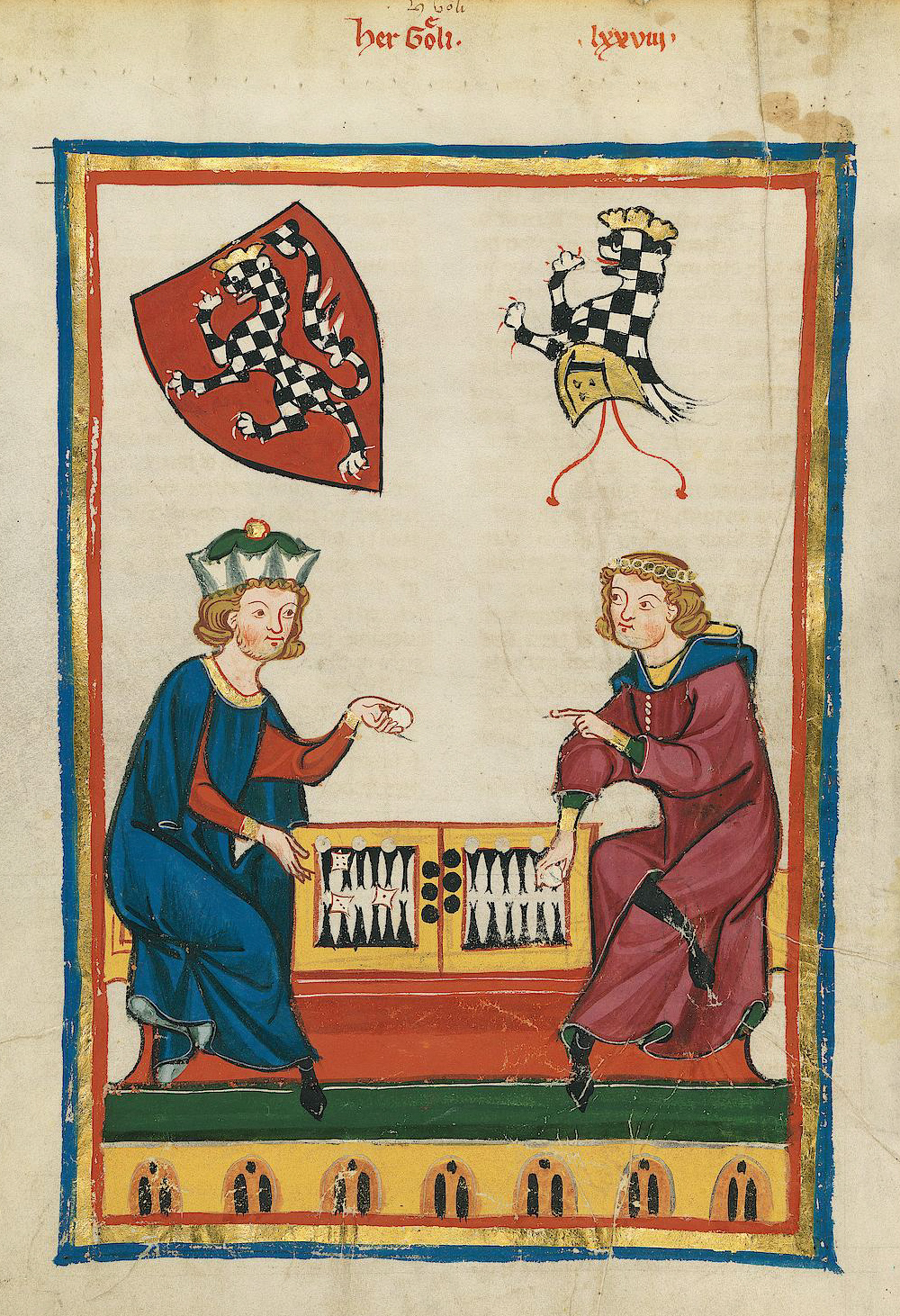
Poet Herr Goeli playing in the 14c, Codex Manesse, Heidelberg University Library

Tables games first appeared in France during the 11th century and became a favourite pastime of gamblers. In 1254, Louis IX issued a decree prohibiting his court officials and subjects from playing. They were played in Germany in the 12th century, and had reached Iceland by the 13th century. In Spain, the Alfonso X manuscript Libro de los Juegos, completed in 1283, describes rules for a number of dice and table games in addition to its discussion of chess. By the 17th century, games at tables had spread to Sweden. A wooden board and counters were recovered from the wreck of the Vasa among the belongings of the ship's officers. Tables games appear widely in paintings of this period, mainly those of Dutch and German painters, such as van Ostade, Jan Steen, Hieronymus Bosch, and Bruegel. Among surviving artworks are Cardsharps by Caravaggio.

=== Backgammon ===
==== Early backgammon ====
Backgammon's immediate predecessor was the 16th century tables game of Irish. Irish was the Anglo-Scottish equivalent of the French Toutes Tables and Spanish Todas Tablas, the latter name first being used in the 1283 El Libro de los Juegos, a translation of Arabic manuscripts by the Toledo School of Translators. Irish had been popular at the Scottish court of James IV and considered to be "the more serious and solid game" when the variant which became known as Backgammon began to emerge in the first half of the 17th century. In medieval Italy, Barail was played on a backgammon board, with the important difference that both players moved their pieces counter-clockwise and starting from the same side of the board. The game rules for Barail are recorded in a 13th-century manuscript held in the Italian National Library in Florence.

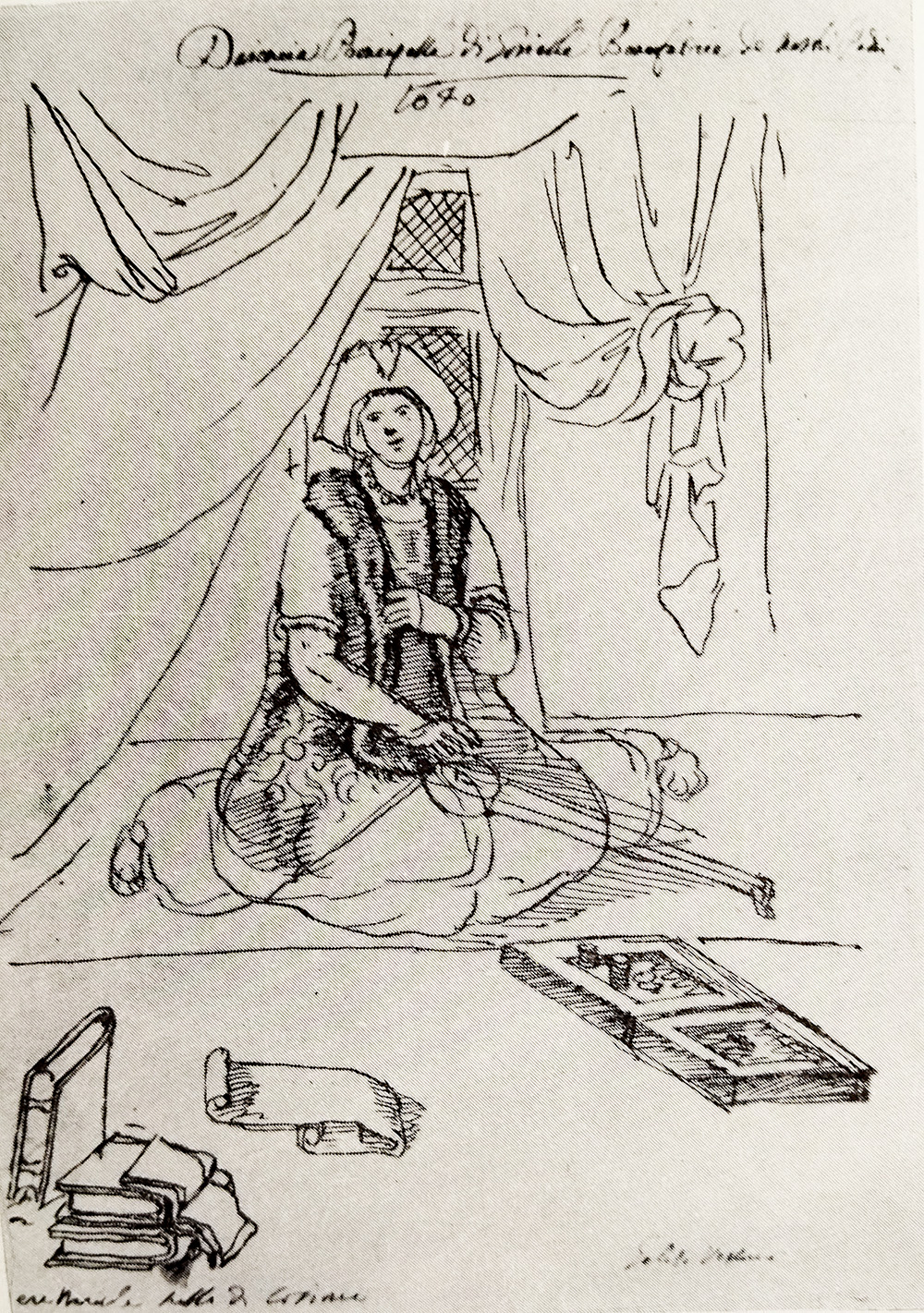
A Georgian noblewoman Darnica Gurieli with backgammon in the foreground, circa 1635

The earliest mention of backgammon, under the name Baggammon, was by James Howell in a letter dated 1647. (Note: The fact that this is the earliest mention is stated in Fiske (1905), p. 285.) In English, the word "backgammon" is most likely derived from "back" and Middle English: gamen, meaning "game" or "play". Meanwhile, the first use documented by the Oxford English Dictionary was in 1647. In 1666, it is reported that the "old name for backgammon used by Shakespeare and others" was Tables. However, it is clear from Willoughby that "tables" was a generic name and that the phrase "playing at tables" was used in a similar way to "playing at cards". The first known rules of "Back Gammon" were produced by Francis Willoughby around 1672; they were quickly followed by Charles Cotton in 1674.

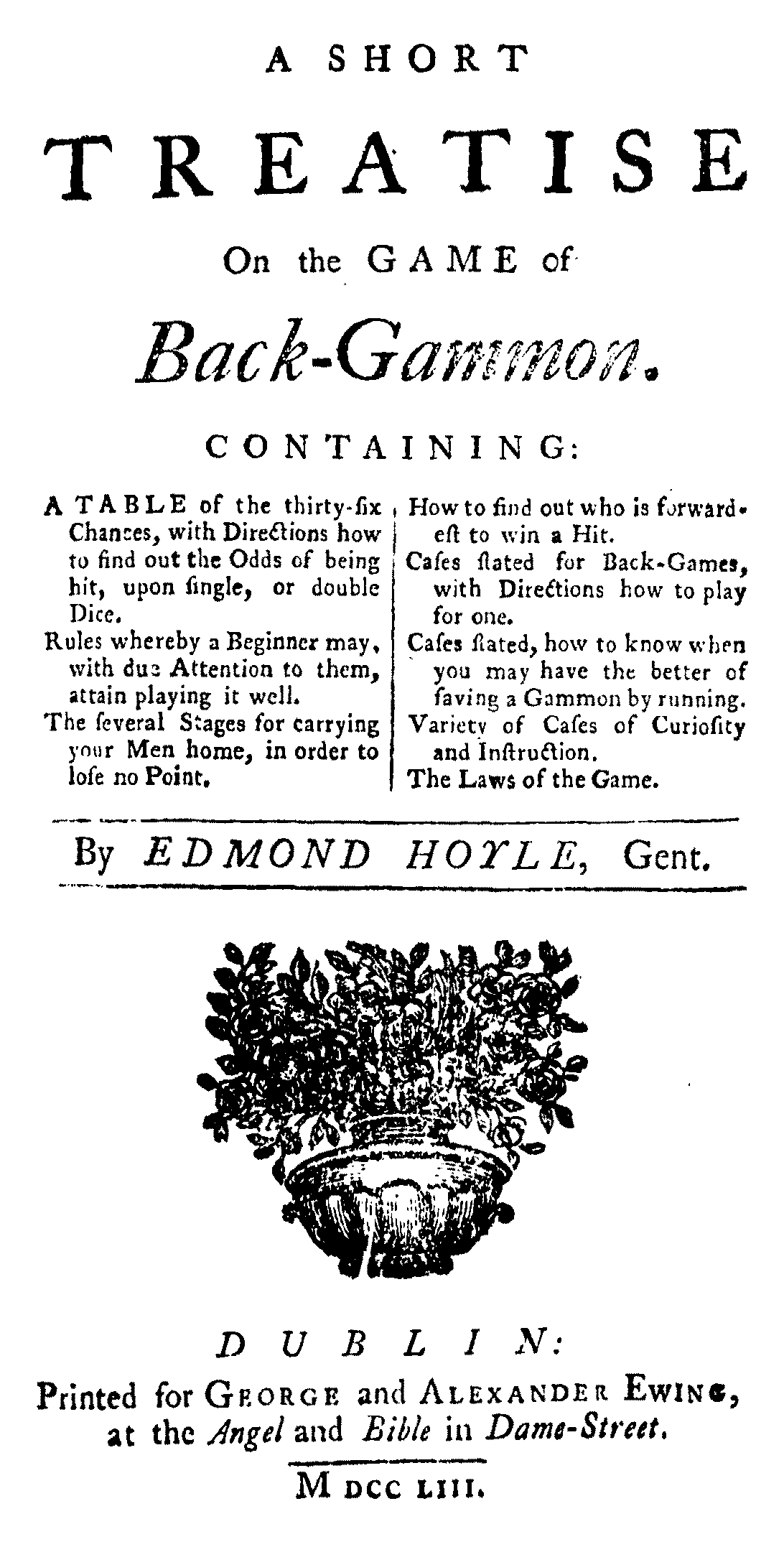
A Short Treatise on the Game of Back-Gammon

In the 16th century, Elizabethan laws and church regulations had prohibited "playing at tables" in England, but by the 18th century, Backgammon had superseded Irish and become popular among the English clergy. Edmond Hoyle published A Short Treatise on the Game of Back-Gammon in 1753; this described rules and strategy for the game and was bound together with a similar text on whist.

The early form of backgammon was very similar to its predecessor, Irish. The aim, board, number of pieces or "men", direction of play and starting layout were the same as in the modern game. (Note: Charles Cotton (1674) gives an alternative starting layout as well as the familiar one.) However, there was no doubling die, there was no bar on the board or the bar was not used (men simply being moved off the table when hit) and the scoring was different. The game was won double if either the winning throw was a doublet or the opponent still had men outside the home board. It was won triple if a player bore all men off before any of the opponent's men reached the home board; this was a back-gammon. Some terminology, such as "point", "hitting a blot", "home", "doublet", "bear off" and "men" are recognisably the same as in the modern game; others, such as "binding a man" (adding a second man to a point) "binding up the tables" (taking all one's first 6 points), "fore game", "latter game", "nipping a man" (hitting a blot and playing it on forwards) "playing at length" (using both dice to move one man) are no longer in vogue.

==== Modern backgammon ====
By no later than 1850, the rules of play had changed to those used today. Tables boards were now made with a "bar" in the centre and men that were hit went onto the bar. Winning double or by "two hits" was achieved by bearing all one's men off before the other has borne any — this was now called a gammon. If the winner bore off all men while the loser still had men in his adversary's table, it was a back-gammon and worth "three hits", i.e., triple.

The most recent major development in backgammon was the addition of the doubling cube. Doubles had originally been recorded by placing "common parlour matches" on the bar in the centre of the board. A doubling cube was first introduced in the 1920s in New York City among members of gaming clubs on the Lower East Side. The cube required players not only to select the best move in a given position, but also to estimate the probability of winning from that position, transforming backgammon into the expected value-driven game played in the 20th and 21st centuries.

The popularity of backgammon surged in the mid-1960s, in part due to the charisma of Prince Alexis Obolensky who became known as "The Father of Modern Backgammon". "Obe", as he was called by friends, co-founded the International Backgammon Association, which published a set of official rules. He also established the World Backgammon Club of Manhattan, devised a backgammon tournament system in 1963, then organized the first major international backgammon tournament in March 1964, which attracted royalty, celebrities and the press. The game became a huge fad and was played on college campuses, in discothèques and at country clubs; stockbrokers and bankers began playing at conservative men's clubs. People young and old all across the country dusted off their boards and pieces. Cigarette, liquor and car companies began to sponsor tournaments, and Hugh Hefner held backgammon parties at the Playboy Mansion. Backgammon clubs were formed and tournaments were held, resulting in a World Championship promoted in Las Vegas in 1967.

In the second half of the 20th century, new terms were introduced in America, such as 'beaver' and 'checkers' for men (although American backgammon experts Oswald Jacoby and John R. Crawford continued to use both the older terms as well as the new ones).

Most recently, the United States Backgammon Federation (USBGF) was organized in 2009 to repopularize the game in the United States. Board and committee members include many of the top players, tournament directors and writers in the worldwide backgammon community. The USBGF has recently created Standards of Ethical Practice to address issues on which tournament rules fail to touch.

In its country of origin, the United Kingdom Backgammon Federation is the national authority and runs a backgammon championship — the Backgammon Galaxy UK Open Tournament — as well as club championships, online leagues and knockout tournaments. Like the USBGF they are active members of the World Backgammon Federation (WBF) and their tournament rules have been adopted in their entirety by the WBF.

==== Software ====
Backgammon entered the computer era in the 1990s when software was developed to play and analyze games, and for people to play one another over the internet.

- Johnson's Expert Backgammon, introduced in 1990, was the first commercially available software package to analyze positions and provide stats for wins, losses, gammons, and backgammons. It was based on conventional programming techniques and only achieved a level of play of weak intermediate.
- TD-Gammon, written by Gerry Tesauro at IBM, used neural net techniques that allowed it to learn based on experience. A full package with rollouts was never released to the public.
- JellyFish, written by Fredriik Dahl and released in 1994, was the first commercially available software based on neural networks, and like TD-Gammon its play approached or surpassed that of the best human players.
- Snowie, written by André Nicoulin and Olivier Egger and released in 1998, was a neural-net program that had similar playing strength to its neural net predecessors, but had a more advanced user interface; in particular it could analyze an entire match instead of just one move at a time.
- gnubg, written by many programmers as part of the GNU free software project, was released in 2001. It has a similar strength to JellyFish, but is free software. It is still supported and is available for Windows, macOS and most varieties of Linux. Since it is open-source, the source code is publicly available.
- eXtreme Gammon, written by Xavier Dufaure de Citres and released in 2009, is available for Windows and mobile platforms. According to the Financial Times, the program is the best backgammon player in the world, and the near-exclusive study tool for all serious backgammon players.

Real-time online play began with the First Internet Backgammon Server in July 1992, but there are now a range of options.

== Rules ==
Backgammon board in starting position with two dice and a doubling cube

Paths of movement for red and black, with pieces in the starting position; viewed from the black side, with home or inner board at lower right

Since 2018, backgammon has been overseen internationally by the World Backgammon Federation who set the rules of play for international tournaments.

Backgammon playing pieces may be termed men, checkers, draughts, stones, counters, pawns, discs, pips, chips, or nips. Checkers is a relatively modern American English term derived from another board game, draughts, which in US English is called checkers.

The objective is for players to bear off all their disc pieces from the board before their opponent can do the same. As the playing time for each individual game is short, it is often played in matches where victory is awarded to the first player to reach a certain number of points.

=== Board ===
The dimensions of a board when opened, for a tournament game, should be at a minimum of 44 cm by 55 cm to a maximum of 66 cm by 88 cm.

=== Setup ===
Each side of the board has a track of 12 isosceles triangles, called points. The points form a continuous track in the shape of a horseshoe, and are numbered from 1 to 24. In the most commonly used setup, each player begins with fifteen pieces; two are placed on their 24-point, three on their 8-point, and five each on their 13-point and their 6-point. The two players move their pieces in opposing directions, from the 24-point towards the 1-point.

Points 1 through 6 are called the home board or inner board, and points 7 through 12 are called the outer board. The 7-point is referred to as the bar point, and the 13-point as the midpoint. The 5-point for each player is sometimes called the "golden point".

=== Movement ===
Video of a backgammon game, showing movement around the board, entering from the bar, formation of primes, use of the doubling cube and bearing off

To start the game, each player rolls one dice, and the player with the higher number moves first using the numbers shown on both dice. If the players roll the same number, they must roll again until they roll different numbers. Both dice must land completely flat on the right-hand side of the gameboard. The players then take alternate turns, rolling two dice at the beginning of each turn.

After rolling the dice, players must, if possible, move their pieces according to the number shown on each die. For example, if the player rolls a 6 and a 3 (denoted as "6-3"), the player must move one piece six points forward, and another or the same piece three points forward. The same piece may be moved twice, as long as the two moves can be made separately and legally: six and then three, or three and then six. If a player rolls two of the same number, called doubles, that player must play each die twice. For example, a roll of 5-5 allows the player to make four moves of five spaces each. On any roll, a player must move according to the numbers on both dice if it is at all possible to do so. If one or both numbers do not allow a legal move, the player forfeits that portion of the roll and the turn ends. If moves can be made according to either one die or the other, but not both, the higher number must be used. If one piece is unable to be moved, but such a move is made possible by the moving of the other piece, that move is compulsory.

In the course of a move, a piece may land on any point that is unoccupied or is occupied by one or more of the player's own pieces. It may also land on a point occupied by exactly one opposing piece, or "blot". In this case, the blot has been "hit" and is placed in the middle of the board on the bar that divides the two sides of the playing surface. A piece may never land on a point occupied by two or more opposing pieces; thus, no point is ever occupied by pieces from both players simultaneously. There is no limit to the number of pieces that can occupy a point or the bar at any given time.

Pieces placed on the bar must re-enter the game through the opponent's home board before any other move can be made. A roll of 1 allows the piece to enter on the 24-point (opponent's 1), a roll of 2 on the 23-point (opponent's 2), and so forth, up to a roll of 6 allowing entry on the 19-point (opponent's 6). Pieces may not enter on a point occupied by two or more opposing pieces. Pieces can enter on unoccupied points, or on points occupied by a single opposing piece; in the latter case, the single piece is hit and placed on the bar. A player may not move any other pieces until all pieces belonging to that player on the bar have re-entered the board. If a player has pieces on the bar, but rolls a combination that does not allow any of those pieces to re-enter, the player does not move. If the opponent's home board is completely "closed" (i.e. all six points are each occupied by two or more pieces), there is no roll that will allow a player to enter a piece from the bar, and that player stops rolling and playing until at least one point becomes open (occupied by one or zero pieces) due to the opponent's moves.

A turn ends only when the player has removed his or her dice from the board. Prior to this moment, a move can be undone and replayed an unlimited number of times.

=== Bearing off ===
When all of a player's pieces are in that player's home board, that player may start removing them; this is called "bearing off". A roll of 1 may be used to bear off a piece from the 1-point, a 2 from the 2-point, and so on. If all of a player's pieces are on points lower than the number showing on a particular die, the player must use that die to bear off one piece from the highest occupied point. For example, if a player rolls a 6 and a 5, but has no pieces on the 6-point and two on the 5-point, then the 6 and the 5 must be used to bear off the two pieces from the 5-point.

The first player to bear off all fifteen of their own pieces wins the game. When keeping score in backgammon, the points awarded depend on the scale of the victory. A player who bears off all fifteen pieces when the opponent has borne off at least one, wins a single game worth 1 point. If all fifteen have been borne off before the opponent gets at least one piece off, this is a gammon or double game worth 2 points. A backgammon or triple game is worth 3 points and occurs when the losing player has borne off no pieces and has one or more on the bar and/or in the winner's home table (inner board).

=== Doubling cube ===
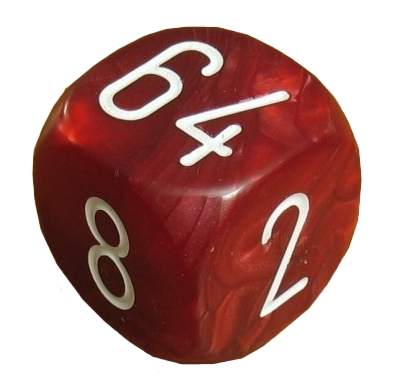
Doubling cube

To speed up match play and to provide an added dimension for strategy, a doubling cube is usually used. The doubling cube is not a die to be rolled, but rather a marker, with the numbers 2, 4, 8, 16, 32, and 64 inscribed on its sides to denote the current stake. At the beginning of the game, the doubling cube is placed halfway between the players, either on the bar or at the side of the board, with the number 64 face up; the cube is then said to be "centered, on 1". When the cube is still centered, either player may start their turn by proposing that the game be played for twice the current stakes. Their opponent must either accept ("take") the doubled stakes or resign ("drop") the game immediately.

Whenever a player accepts doubled stakes, the cube is placed on their side of the board with the corresponding power of two facing upward, to indicate that the right to redouble belongs exclusively to that player. If the opponent drops the doubled stakes, they lose the game at the current value of the doubling cube. For instance, if the cube showed the number 2 and a player wanted to redouble the stakes to put it at 4, the opponent choosing to drop the redouble would lose two, or twice the original stake. There is no limit on the number of redoubles. Although 64 is the highest number depicted on the doubling cube, the stakes may rise to 128, 256, and so on.

In money games, a player who accepts a double may immediately "beaver", doubling the value of the game again while retaining possession of the cube. The player who originally doubled may refuse the beaver, (resign the game and lose the current doubled stakes) or play on with the cube at 4 times its initial value. A player who is beavered may double the stakes once again ("raccoon"); the opponent then has the option of resigning or accepting the raccoon and playing with the cube at 8 times its initial value; in all cases the doubled player retains ownership of the cube.

Some players use the "automatic double rule": If both opponents roll the same opening number, the doubling cube is incremented. When a player decides to double the opponent, the value is then a double of whatever face value is shown (e.g. if there was one automatic double putting the cube up to 2, the first in-game double will be for 4 points). Players usually agree to limit the number of automatic doubles to one per game. The automatic double rule is not an official rule in backgammon, and since it is not used in match play it is rarely, if ever, used in tournaments.

The "Jacoby rule", named after Oswald Jacoby, allows gammons and backgammons to count for their respective double and triple values only if the cube has already been offered and accepted. This encourages a player with a large lead to double, possibly ending the game, rather than to play it to conclusion hoping for a gammon or backgammon. The Jacoby rule is widely used in money play but is not used in match play.

The "Crawford rule", named after John R. Crawford, is designed to make match play more equitable for the player in the lead. If a player is one point away from winning a match, that player's opponent will always want to double as early as possible in order to catch up. Whether the game is worth one point or two, the trailing player must win to continue the match. To balance the situation, the Crawford rule requires that when a player first reaches a score one point short of winning, neither player may use the doubling cube for the following game, called the "Crawford game". After the Crawford game, normal use of the doubling cube resumes. The Crawford rule is routinely used in tournament match play. It is possible for a Crawford game to never occur in a match.

If the Crawford rule is in effect, then another option is the "Holland rule", named after Tim Holland, which stipulates that after the Crawford game, a player cannot double until after at least two rolls have been played by each side. It was common in tournament play in the 1980s, but is now rarely used.

== Related games ==
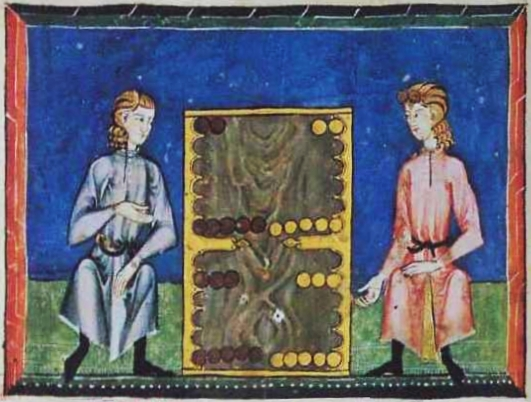
Todas tablas from the Spanish Libro de los juegos (‘Book of Games’)

Minor variations to the standard game are common among casual players in certain regions. For instance, only allowing a maximum of five men on any point (Britain) or disallowing "hit-and-run" in the home board (Middle East).

There are also many relatives of backgammon within the tables family with different aims, modes of play and strategies. Some are played primarily throughout one geographic region, and others add new tactical elements to the game. These other tables games commonly have a different starting position, restrict certain moves, or assign special value to certain dice rolls, but in some geographic games even the rules and direction of movement of the counters change, rendering them fundamentally different.

Acey-deucey is a relative of backgammon in which players start with no counters on the board, and must enter them onto the board at the beginning of the game. The roll of 1-2 is given special consideration, allowing the player, after moving the 1 and the 2, to select any desired doubles move. A player also receives an extra turn after a roll of 1-2 or of doubles.

Hypergammon is a game in which players have only three counters on the board, starting with one each on the 24, 23 and 22 points. With the aid of a computer this game was solved by Hugh Sconyers around 1994, meaning that exact equities for all cube positions are available for all 32 million possible positions.

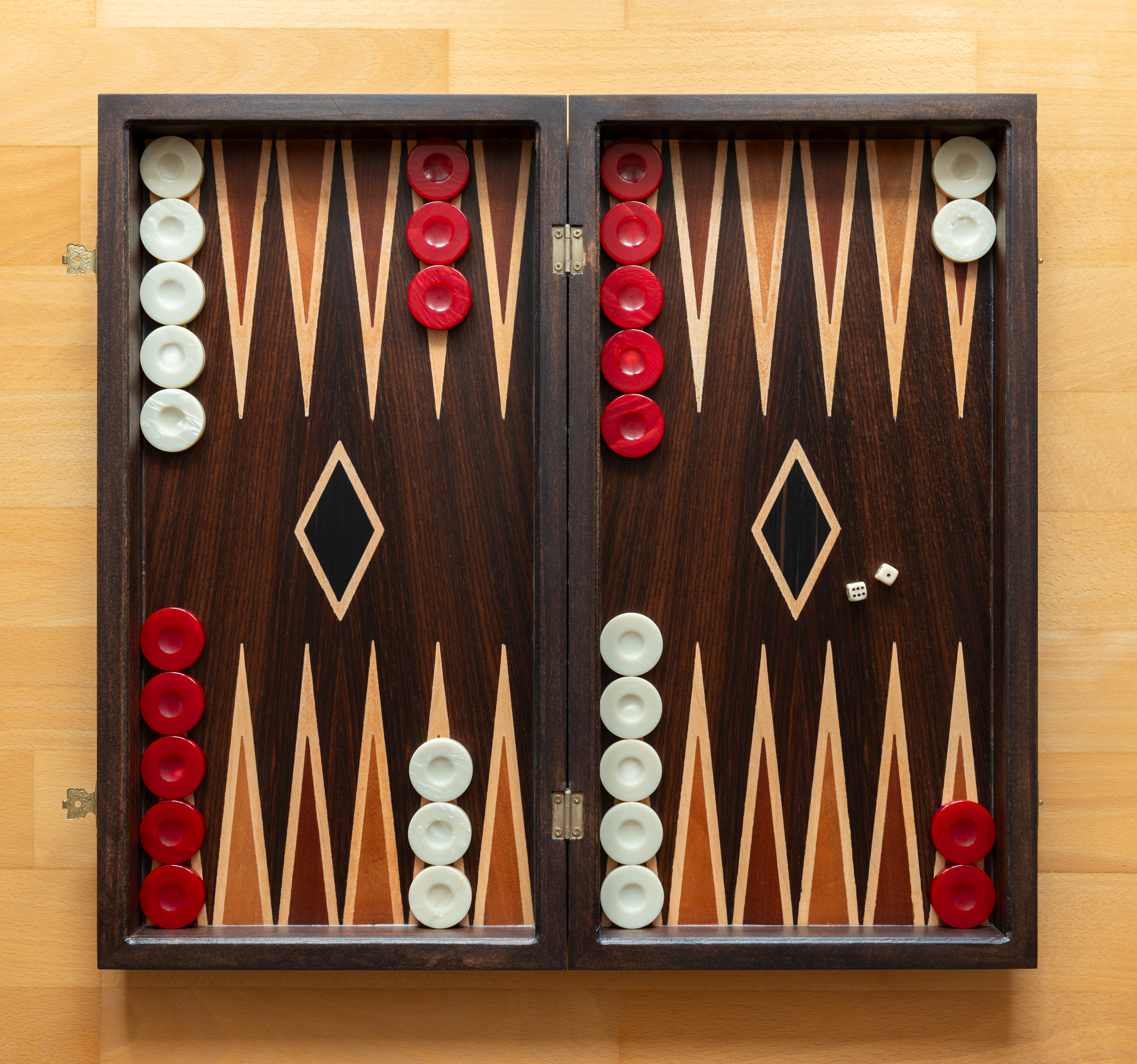
A Greek Tavli board. The sound of the dice hitting the wooden board is a typical characteristic of Tavli and the coffee-house culture surrounding it.

Nard is a traditional tables game from Persia which may be an ancestor of backgammon. It has a different opening layout in which all 15 pieces start on the 24th point. During play pieces may not be hit and there are no gammons or backgammons.

Ban-sugoroku is a Japanese game that is a close relative of backgammon. It utilizes the same starting position but has slightly different rules.

Russian backgammon is a variant described in 1895 as: "much in vogue in Russia, Germany, and other parts of the Continent". Players start with no counters on the board, and both players move in the same direction to bear off in a common home board. In this variant, doubles are powerful: four moves are played as in backgammon, followed by four moves according to the difference of the dice value from 7, and then the player has another turn (with the caveat that the turn ends if any portion of it cannot be completed).

Gul bara and Tapa are tables games popular in south-eastern Europe and Turkey. The play will iterate among Backgammon, Gul Bara, and Tapa until one of the players reaches a score of 7 or 5.

Coan ki is an ancient Chinese tables game.

Plakoto, Fevga and Portes are three varieties of tables games played in Greece. Together, the three are referred to as Tavli and are usually played one after the other; game being three, five, or seven points.

Misere (backgammon to lose) is a variant of backgammon in which the objective is to lose the game.

Tavla is a Turkish variation.

== Strategy and tactics ==
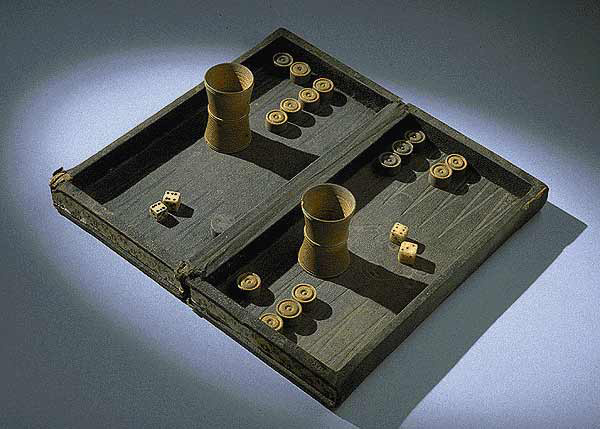
Backgammon set, 19th century

Backgammon is played in two principal variations, money and match play:

- Money play means that every point counts evenly and every game stands alone, whether money is actually being wagered or not; sometimes it is called unlimited play.
- Match play means that the players play until one side scores (or exceeds) a certain number of points.

The format has a significant effect on strategy. In a match, the objective is not to win the maximum possible number of points, but rather to simply reach the score needed to win the match, so optimal play may depend on the match score. In money play, the theoretically correct piece play and cube action would never vary based on the score.

Backgammon has an established opening theory, although it is less detailed than that of chess. The tree of positions expands rapidly because of the number of possible dice rolls and the moves available on each turn. Recent computer analysis has offered more insight on opening plays, but the midgame is reached quickly. After the opening, backgammon players frequently rely on some established general strategies, combining and switching among them to adapt to the changing conditions of a game. There are several strategies or "game plans" to achieve a win:

- The running game is a strategy minimizing or breaking contact while ahead in the race.
- The holding game is holding a point on the opponent's side of the board, called an anchor. As the game progresses, the player may gain an advantage by hitting an opponent's blot from the anchor or by rolling large doubles that allow the pieces to escape into a running game.
- The priming game involves building a wall of pieces, called a prime, covering a number of consecutive points. This obstructs opposing pieces that are behind the prime. A piece trapped behind a six-point prime cannot escape until the prime is broken.
- The attacking game, sometimes called a blitz, is a strategy of covering the home board as quickly as possible while hitting one's opponent and keeping them on the bar. Because the opponent has difficulty re-entering from the bar or escaping, a player can quickly gain a race advantage and win the game, often with a gammon.

A backgame is a strategy that involves holding two or more anchors in an opponent's home board while being substantially behind in the race. The anchors obstruct the opponent's pieces and create opportunities to hit them as they move home. The backgame is generally used only to salvage a game wherein a player is already significantly behind. Using a backgame as an initial strategy is usually unsuccessful.

Duplication refers to the placement of pieces such that one's opponent needs the same dice rolls to achieve different goals. For example, players may position all of their blots in such a way that the opponent must roll a 2 in order to hit any of them, reducing the probability of being hit more than once.

Diversification refers to a complementary tactic of placing one's own pieces in such a way that more numbers are useful.

The pipcount is number of pips needed to move a player's pieces around and off the board. Many positions require a measurement of a player's standing in the race, for example, in making a doubling cube decision, or in determining whether to run home and begin bearing off. The difference between the two players' pip counts is a measure of the leader's racing advantage. For cube decisions, a number of formulas have been developed over the years, including the Thorpe count, the Ward count, the Keith count, and iSight. These calculations enable a player to determine whether to offer or take a double based on the pipcount in non-contact positions.

=== Cube handling ===
Two theoretical models provide a basis for cube handling, i.e. when to offer a double and when to accept an offered double. Both ignore the effects of gammons and backgammons.

- The dead cube model ignores the advantage the taker gets from having sole access to the cube. It estimates that the takepoint (i.e. the minimum game winning chances to accept a cube) is 25% and the doubling window opens at 50%.
- The live cube model assumes a maximum value for sole cube access (i.e. that the taker may use the cube most efficiently by either raising the stakes or doubling out the opponent). It estimates that the takepoint is 20% and the doubling window opens at 80%.

In practice, the takepoints and doubling points are somewhere in between, since while cube ownership cannot be ignored, assuming maximal efficiency for a re-cube is also not a valid assumption. Ignoring gammons and backgammons, the takepoint in money play is about 22%. All of the above ignores gammons and backgammons for either side, so in practice the calculation of takepoints is more complicated.

== Equity ==
A player's equity in a money or unlimited game is the average expected value that will be won or lost as a result of that game. For instance, if a player is certain to win but has no chance of a gammon or backgammon their equity is 1 and their opponent's equity is −1. If it is certain that the player will win a backgammon, their equity is 3 and their opponent's equity is −3. In Example 1 below, the player's winning chances are 75%, which corresponds to an equity of +0.5.

Example 1

Suppose there are only two pieces left on the board and the player on-roll has a piece on their six point and the opponent has a piece on their one point. The player on-roll will bear off with 27/36 rolls or 75% of the time. If the game was played from that position 100 times the on-roll player would win ~75 games and their opponent would win ~25 for a net win of ~50 points per 100 games. The on-roll player's equity would be .5 and their opponent's would be −.5.
If the doubling cube was accessible they could offer the cube and increase their equity to 1: either their opponent passes the cube and the game is over, or their opponent takes the cube and loses 100 points per 100 games (instead of the 50 with the cube centered). This illustrates that the raw takepoint for money play is 25%.

Example 2

Now, suppose the on-roll player has two pieces, one on the five point and one on the one point while their opponent still has one on the one point. 23 rolls bear off both pieces so the winning percentage is 64% instead of 75% and the equities are about +0.28 ((64−36)/100) and −0.28. If the on-roll player offers the cube, their equity doubles to 0.56 and their opponent should take the cube because −0.56 is better than −1.

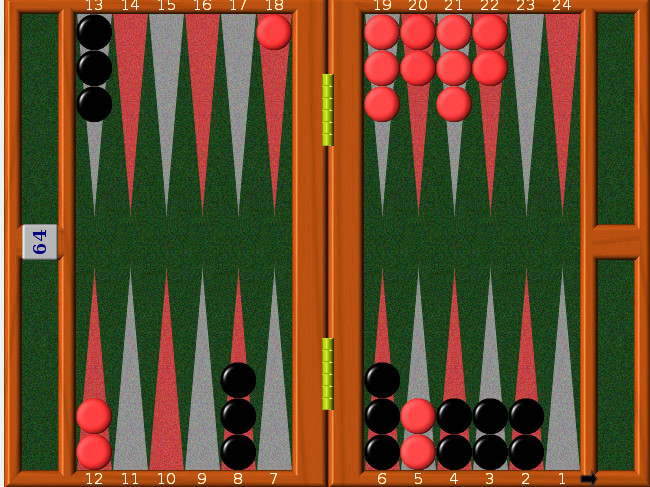

Example 3

This example is more complicated, since there are gammons and backgammons to be had by both players and it is not the last chance to offer the cube. Computer analysis estimates the player with the black pieces wins 72.1% of games, plus 2.0% gammons, and 0.1% backgammons. Their opponent wins 27.9% of games, 2.0% gammons, and no backgammons. This adds up to the following equities:

No double 0.667

Double, take 0.684

Double, pass 1.000

The on-roll player should offer a double since their equity increases, and their opponent should take since they retain more equity by taking than passing.

== Cheating ==
To reduce the possibility of cheating, most good-quality backgammon sets use precision dice and a dice cup. This reduces the likelihood of loaded dice being used, which is the main way of cheating in face-to-face play. A common method of cheating online is the use of a computer program to find the optimal move on each turn; to combat this, many online sites use move-comparison software that identifies when a player's moves resemble those of a backgammon program. Online cheating has therefore become extremely difficult.

== Social and competitive play ==
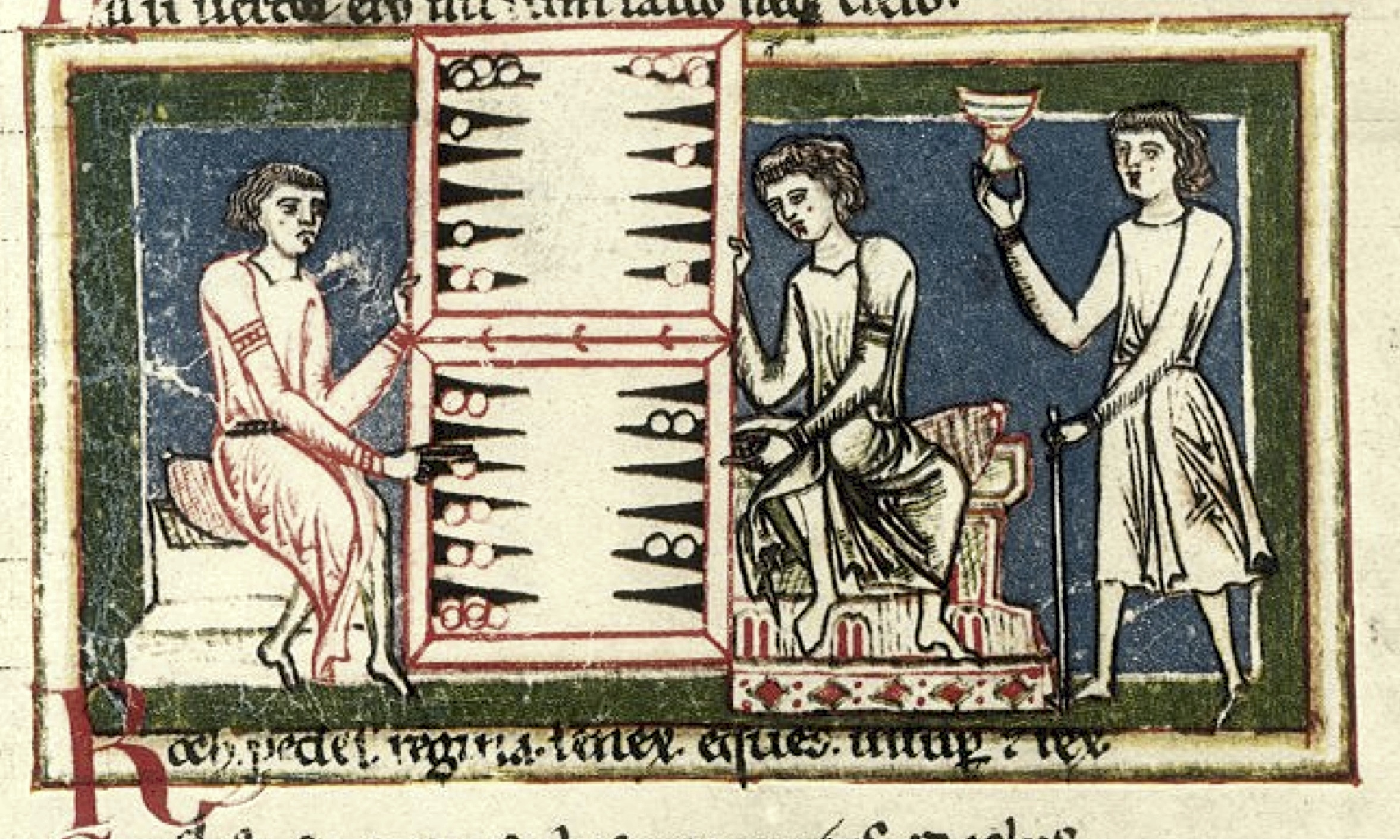
Medieval players of a tables game, from the 13th-century Carmina Burana

=== Legality ===
In State of Oregon v. Barr, a 1982 court case pivotal to the continued widespread organised playing of backgammon in the US, the State argued that backgammon is a game of chance and that it was therefore subject to Oregon's stringent gambling laws. Paul Magriel was a key witness for the defence, contradicting Roger Nelson, the expert prosecution witness, by saying, "Game theory, however, really applies to games with imperfect knowledge, where something is concealed, such as poker. Backgammon is not such a game. Everything is in front of you. The person who uses that information in the most effective manner will win." After the closing arguments, Judge Stephen S. Walker concluded that backgammon is a game of skill, not a game of chance, and found the defendant, backgammon tournament director Ted Barr, not guilty of promoting gambling.

=== Club and tournament play ===
Played ad hoc in cafés and bars, clubs throughout Europe also host backgammon with informal gatherings to play throughout the day or in the evening as well as by way of social interaction. A few clubs offer specialized backgammon services, maintaining their own facilities or offering computer analysis of troublesome plays. Around 2003, some club leaders noticed a growth of interest in backgammon, and attributed it to the game's popularity on the internet.

A backgammon chouette permits three or more players to participate in a single game, often for money. One player competes against a team of all the other participants, and positions rotate after each game. Chouette play often permits the use of multiple doubling cubes.

Backgammon clubs may also organize tournaments. Large club tournaments sometimes draw competitors from other regions, with final matches viewed by hundreds of spectators. The top players at regional tournaments often compete in major national and international championships. Winners at major tournaments may receive prizes of tens of thousands of dollars.

A successful triangular backgammon tournament, devised by UKBGF, was hosted in 2025 by the Walbrook Club versus the Haberdashers' & Salters' Companies.

=== International competition ===
The first world championship competition in backgammon was held in Las Vegas, Nevada, in 1967. Tim Holland was declared the winner that year and at the tournament the following year. For unknown reasons, there was no championship in 1970, but in 1971, Tim Holland again won the title. The competition remained in Las Vegas until 1975, when it moved to Paradise Island in the Bahamas. The years 1976, 1977 and 1978 saw "dual" World Championships, one in the Bahamas attended by the Americans, and the European Open Championships in Monte Carlo with mostly European players. In 1979, Lewis Deyong, who had promoted the Bahamas World Championship for the prior three years, suggested that the two events be combined. Monte Carlo was universally acknowledged as the site of the World Backgammon Championship and has remained as such for thirty years. The Monte Carlo tournament draws hundreds of players and spectators, and is played over the course of a week.

By the 21st century, the largest international tournaments had established the basis of a tour for top professional players. Major tournaments are held yearly worldwide. PartyGaming sponsored the first World Series of Backgammon in 2006 from Cannes and later the "Backgammon Million" tournament held in the Bahamas in January 2007 with a prize pool of one million dollars, the largest for any tournament to date. In 2008, the World Series of Backgammon ran the world's largest international events in London, the UK Masters, the biggest tournament ever held in the UK with 128 international class players; the Nordic Open, which instantly became the largest in the world with around 500 players in all flights and 153 in the championship, and Cannes, which hosted the Riviera Cup, the traditional follow-up tournament to the World Championships. Cannes also hosted the WSOB championship, the WSOB finale, which saw 16 players play three-point shootout matches for €160,000. The event was recorded for television in Europe and aired on Eurosport.

The World Backgammon Association (WBA) has been holding the biggest backgammon tour on the circuit since 2007, the "European Backgammon Tour" (EBGT). In 2011, the WBA collaborated with the online backgammon provider Play65 for the 2011 season of the European Backgammon Tour and with "Betfair" in 2012. The 2013 season of the European Backgammon Tour featured 11 stops and 19 qualified players competing for €19,000 in a grand finale in Lefkosa, Northern Cyprus.

=== Gambling ===
When backgammon is played for money, the most common arrangement is to assign a monetary value to each point, and to play to a certain score, or until either player chooses to stop. The stakes are raised by gammons, backgammons, and use of the doubling cube. Backgammon is sometimes available in casinos. Before the commercialization of artificial neural network programs, proposition bets on specific positions were very common among backgammon players and gamblers. As with most gambling games, successful play requires a combination of luck and skill, as a single dice roll can sometimes significantly change the outcome of the game.

== Mediterranean and West Asian cultural significance ==
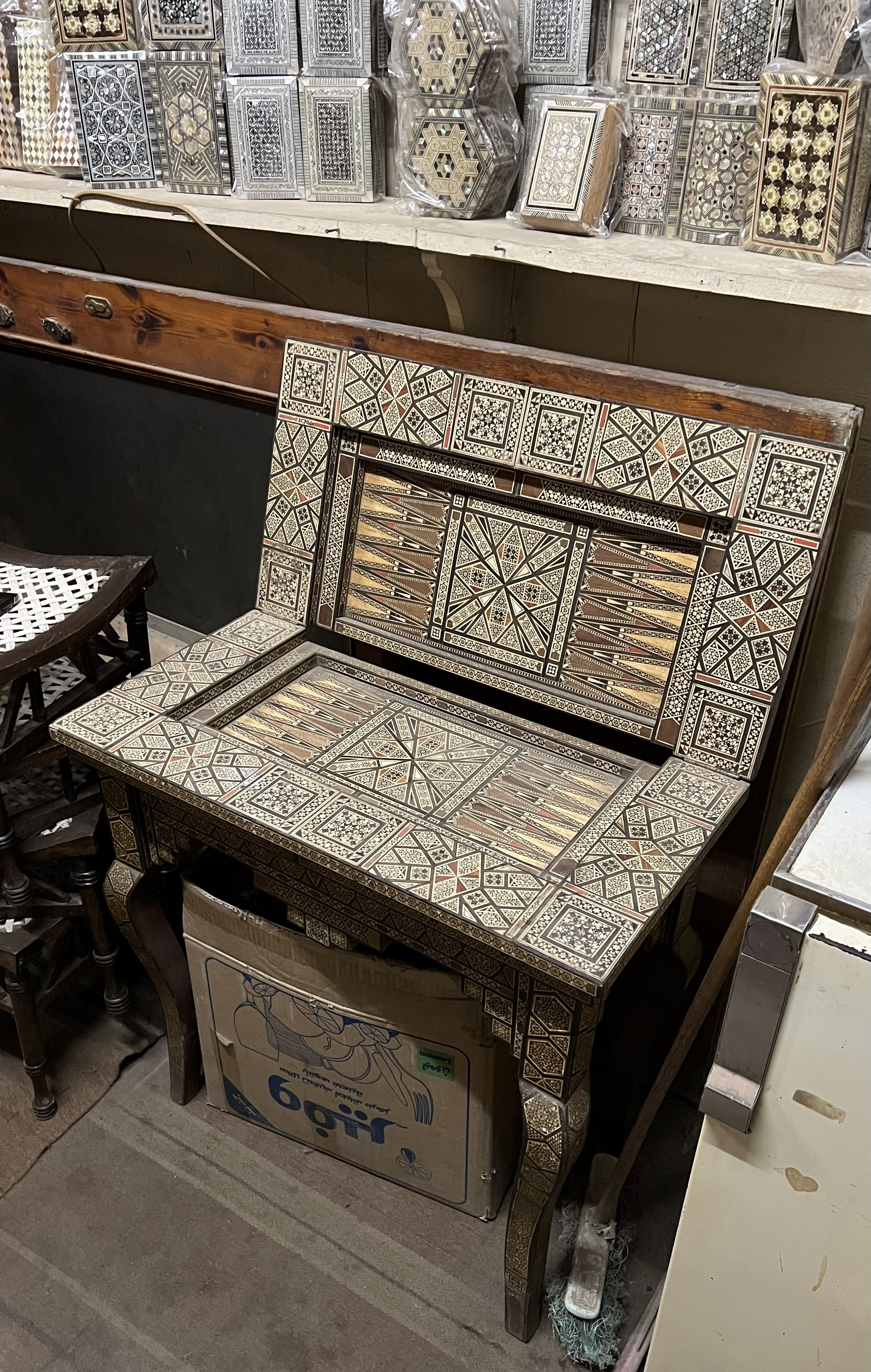
Damascene-style marquetry backgammon board, Khan el-Khalili, Cairo

Backgammon is considered the national game in many countries of the Eastern Mediterranean: Egypt, Turkey, Cyprus, Syria, Israel, Palestine, Lebanon and Greece.

The popularity of the game across the region is primarily an oral tradition, and appears to have been strengthened during the era of the Ottoman Empire, which controlled the whole Eastern Mediterranean in the early modern period. Backgammon is also widely popular in Armenia and frequently played in public spaces. Afif Bahnassi, Syria's director of antiquities, stated in 1988: "For some reason, backgammon became the rage of the Ottoman Empire. It really spread across the Arab world with the Turks, and it stayed behind when they left." The game is a common feature of coffeehouses throughout the region. Since at least the early 19th century, Damascus became well known as the preeminent location for Damascene-style wooden marquetry backgammon sets that have become famous throughout the region.

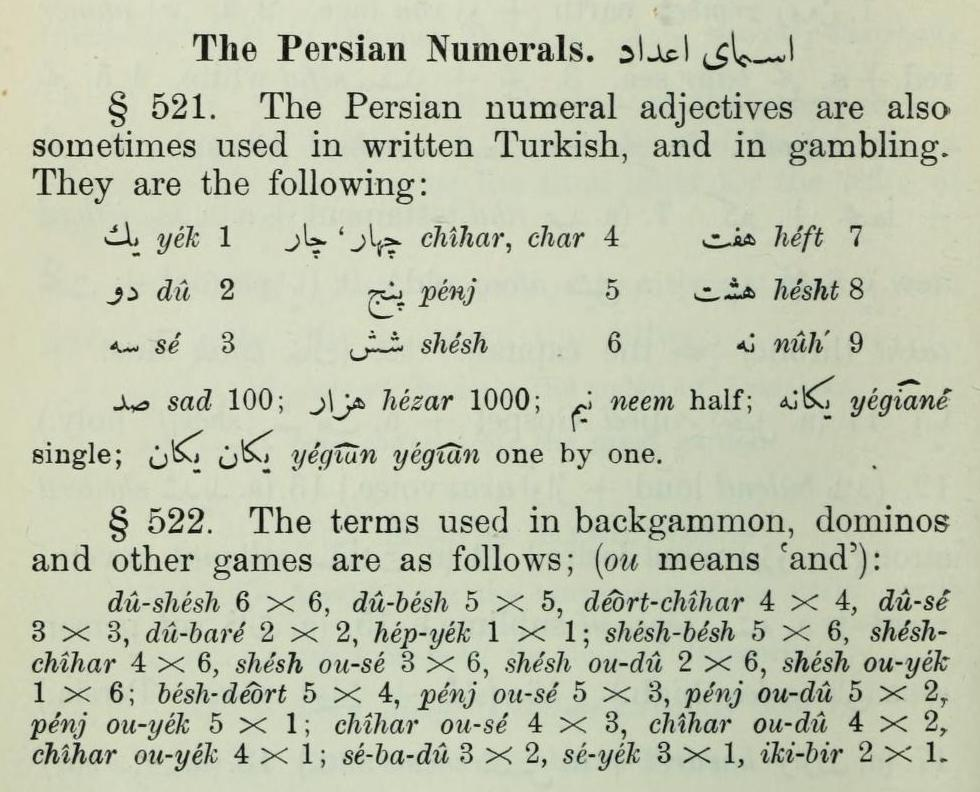
Backgammon and Dominos numbers in Ottoman Turkish of Persian origin, in V. H. Hagopian's 1907 Ottoman-Turkish Conversation-Grammar. James Redhouse's milestone Ottoman Turkish dictionary in the 19th century described a similar phenomenon alongside many other Ottoman words of Persian or Turkish origin.

A unique feature of backgammon throughout the region is players' use of mixed Persian and Turkish numbers to announce dice rolls, rather than Arabic or other local languages. Related to this phenomenon, the game is frequently referred to as Shesh Besh, which is a rhyming combination shesh, meaning ‘six’ in Persian (as well as many historical and current Iranian languages), and besh, meaning five in Turkish. Shesh besh is commonly used to refer to when a player scores a 5 and 6 at the same time on dice. This language contains six types of irregular inflections:

- 1) doubles in pure Persian, (6–6 and 3–3);
- 2a) unequal throws in pure Persian, higher followed by lower
- 2b) unequal throws in pure Persian, with a connecting vowel in between
- 3) Mixed Turkish-Persian numeral (6–5, 5–5, 4–4)
- 4) alternatives for 2a and 2b in pure Turkish (6–4, 5–4, 5–1, 2–1)
- 5) special cases (3–2, 2–2, 1–1); where 3–2 is a version of 2a with a "ba" added for phonetic reasons, 2–2 is Persian: دوباره for "twice" or two-times-two, and 1–1 is a hybrid Turkish-Persian where hep is Turkish for "altogether".

In the early 20th century, as use of Classical Arabic was being promoted with the rise of Arab nationalism, efforts were made to replace the Persian-Turkish numbers used in backgammon play.

Dice throw language used across the Eastern Mediterranean
Throw		Language		
Image	Numbers	Turkish	Persian	Bulgarian
	1–1	Hep Yek	هبت يك	Еп-ек (еци, епеци); Ep-ek (eci, epeci)
	2–2	Dubara	دوبارة	Дю-бара (дубари); Du-bara (dubara, dubari)
	2–1	Dü yek; yek-i dü; Iki Bir	دُو يك	Ик-и-бир; Ik-i-bir
	3–3	Dü Se	دوسة	Дю-се (ме-се); Du-se (me-se)
	3–2	Seba-i Dü	سِه دُو	Себа-и-дю; Seba-i-du
	3–1	Se Yek	سِه يك	Се-и-ек; Se-i-ek
	4–4	Dört Cihar (Dört Caar)	درجي	Дьорт-джехар (джаар, дорджар); Djort-jahar (jaar, dordjar)
	4–3	Cihar-ü Se (Caar-i Se)	جهار سِه	Джехар-у-се; Jehar-u-se
	4–2	Cihar-i Dü (Caar-i Dü)	جهار دُو	Джехар-и-дю; Jehar-i-du
	4–1	Cihar-ı Yek (Caar-i Yek)	جهار يك	Джехар-и-ек; Jehar-i-ek
	5–5	Dü Beş	دبش	Дю-беш; Du-besh
	5–4	Beş Dört; Cihar-ü Penc (Caar-i Penc)	پنج جهار	Беш-дьорт; Besh-dyort
	5–3	Penc-ü Se	پنج سِه	Пендж-и-се; Penj-i-se
	5–2	Penc-i Dü	پنج دُو	Пендж-и-дю; Panj-i-du
	5–1	Penc-i Yek; Beş Bir	پنج يك	Пендж-и-ек; Panj-i-ek
	6–6	Dü Şeş	دشش	Дю-шеш; Du-shesh
	6–5	Şeş Beş	شيش بيش	Шеш-беш; Shesh-besh
	6–4	Şeş Cihar (Altɨdört)	شيش جهار	Шеш-джехар; Shesh-jehar
	6–3	Şeş-ü Se	شيش سِه	Шеш-у-се; Shesh-u-se
	6–2	Şeş-i Dü	شيش دُو	Шеш-и-дю; Shash-i-du
	6–1	Şeş-i Yek	شيش يك	Шеш-у-ек; Shesh-u-ek.

== Studies and analysis ==
Backgammon has been studied considerably by computer scientists. Neural networks and other approaches have offered significant advances to software for gameplay and analysis. With 15 white and 15 black counters and 24 possible positions, backgammon has 18 quintillion possible legal positions.

The first strong computer opponent was BKG 9.8. It was written by Hans Berliner in the late 1970s on a DEC PDP-10 as an experiment in evaluating board game positions. Early versions of BKG played badly even against poor players, but Berliner noticed that its critical mistakes were always at transitional phases in the game. He applied principles of fuzzy logic to improve its play between phases, and by July 1979, BKG 9.8 was strong enough to play against the reigning world champion Luigi Villa. It won the match 7–1, becoming the first computer program to defeat a world champion in any board game. Berliner stated that the victory was largely a matter of luck, as the computer received more favorable dice rolls.

In the late 1980s, backgammon programmers found more success with an approach based on artificial neural networks. TD-Gammon, developed by Gerald Tesauro of IBM, was the first of these programs to play near the expert level. Its neural network was trained using temporal difference learning applied to data generated from self-play. According to assessments by Bill Robertie and Kit Woolsey, TD-Gammon's play was at or above the level of the top human players in the world. Woolsey said of the program that "There is no question in my mind that its positional judgment is far better than mine."

Tesauro proposed using rollout analysis to compare the performance of computer algorithms against human players. In this method, a Monte-Carlo evaluation of positions is conducted (typically thousands of trials) where different random dice sequences are simulated. The rollout score of the human (or the computer) is the difference of the average game results by following the selected move versus following the best move, then averaged for the entire set of taken moves.

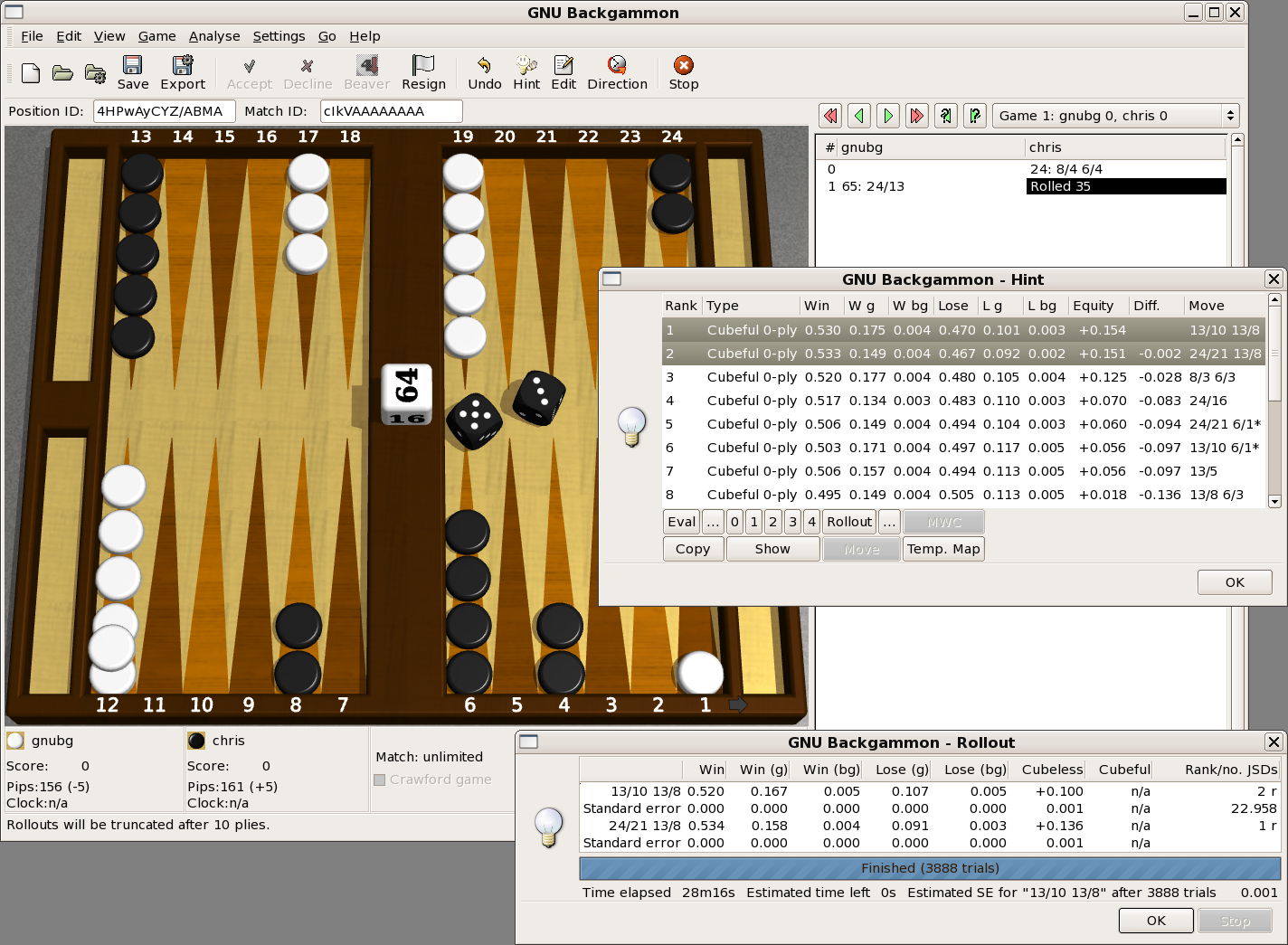
A screen shot of GNU Backgammon, showing an evaluation and rollout of possible moves

Neural network research has resulted in three modern proprietary programs, JellyFish, Snowie and eXtreme Gammon, as well as the shareware BGBlitz and the free software GNU Backgammon. JellyFish and Snowie are no longer actively developed or maintained, while eXtreme Gammon, BGBlitz, and GNU Backgammon remain in active use. These programs not only play the game, but offer tools for analyzing games and detailed comparisons of individual moves. The strength of these programs lies in their neural networks' weight tables, which are the result of extensive training. Without them, these programs play no better than a human novice. For the bearoff phase, backgammon software usually relies on a database containing precomputed equities for all possible bearoff positions. There are 54,263 bearoff positions for each side. This means there are 54,263^{2} total bearoff positions (approximately 3 billion positions). In 1981 Hugh Sconyers wrote a computer program that solved all positions with nine pieces or fewer for both sides. In the early 1990s Hugh extended his results to all bearoff positions. For each position there are four results: no cube, roller's cube, center cube and opponent's cube. Thus, Hugh's bearoff database contains the exact answers to approximately 12 billion bearoff situations.

Another neural network software developed by Nikolaos Papachristou is Palamedes that was developed in the early 2000s and it can also play variations like Hypergammon, Portes, Plakoto, Fevga, Narde and has multiple engines for each one.

Computer-versus-computer competitions are also held at Computer Olympiad events.

== See also ==
- Backgammon notation
- Tables games
- Tabletop games
