= New Jersey Devils =

National Hockey League team in Newark, New Jersey

- 2026–27 New Jersey Devils season
- Conference: Eastern
- Division: Metropolitan
- Founded: 1974
- History: Kansas City Scouts; 1974–1976; Colorado Rockies; 1976–1982; New Jersey Devils; 1982–present
- Home arena: Prudential Center
- City: Newark, New Jersey
- Team colors: Red, black, white
- Media: MSG Sportsnet; MSG Network; Audacy; WFAN
- Owners: Harris Blitzer Sports & Entertainment; (David Blitzer and Josh Harris) (Note: As managing partners. Limited partners include: David Adelman; Martin Geller; Marc Leder)
- General manager: Sunny Mehta
- Head coach: Sheldon Keefe
- Captain: Nico Hischier
- Minor league affiliates: Utica Comets (AHL); Adirondack Thunder (ECHL)
- Stanley Cups: 3 (1994–95, 1999–00, 2002–03)
- Conference championships: 5 (1994–95, 1999–00, 2000–01, 2002–03, 2011–12)
- Presidents' Trophies: 0
- Division championships: 9 (1996–97, 1997–98, 1998–99, 2000–01, 2002–03, 2005–06, 2006–07, 2008–09, 2009–10)
- Official website: nhl.com/devils

The New Jersey Devils are a professional ice hockey team based in Newark, New Jersey. The Devils compete in the National Hockey League (NHL) as a member of the Metropolitan Division in the Eastern Conference. The club was founded as the Kansas City Scouts in Kansas City, Missouri, in 1974. The Scouts moved to Denver in 1976 and became the Colorado Rockies. In 1982, they moved to East Rutherford, New Jersey, and took their current name, which alludes to the legendary Jersey Devil creature. For their first 25 seasons in New Jersey, the Devils were based at the Meadowlands Sports Complex in East Rutherford and played their home games at Brendan Byrne Arena (later renamed Continental Airlines Arena). Before the 2007–08 season, the team moved to Prudential Center in Newark. Since 2013, the Devils have been owned and managed by Harris Blitzer Sports & Entertainment (HBSE).

The franchise was poor to mediocre in the eight years before moving to New Jersey, with only one playoff appearance and no winning seasons. The pattern continued during the first five years in New Jersey, with no playoff appearances and never finishing higher than fifth in a six-team division. Their fortunes changed after Lou Lamoriello was hired as president and general manager in 1987. The Devils made the playoffs in all but three seasons from 1988 to 2012, including 13 berths in a row from 1997 to 2010, and finished with a winning record every season from 1992–93 to 2009–10. They have won the Atlantic Division regular season title nine times, most recently in 2009–10, before transferring to the new Metropolitan Division as part of the NHL's realignment in 2013. The Devils have reached the Stanley Cup Final five times, winning in 1994–95, 1999–2000 and 2002–03, and losing in 2000–01 and 2011–12. Throughout their years of Cup contention, the Devils were known for their defense-first approach, and were one of the teams credited with popularizing the neutral zone trap in the mid-1990s.

The Devils have a rivalry with their cross-Hudson River neighbor, the New York Rangers, and a rivalry with the Philadelphia Flyers. The Devils are one of three NHL teams in the New York metropolitan area, along with the Rangers and the New York Islanders. The Devils are one of four major professional sports teams that play their home games in New Jersey, along with the National Football League's New York Giants and New York Jets, and the New York Red Bulls of Major League Soccer. Since the New Jersey Nets moved to Brooklyn in 2012, the Devils have been the only major league team in any sport to bill themselves as solely representing the state of New Jersey.

== History ==
=== Kansas City and Colorado ===
In 1972, the National Hockey League (NHL) announced plans to add two expansion teams, including one in Kansas City, Missouri, owned by a group headed by Edwin G. Thompson. The new team was named the Scouts, alluding to Cyrus E. Dallin's statue of the name in Kansas City's Penn Valley Park. In the team's inaugural season, 1974–75, the Scouts were forced to wait until the ninth game to play in Kansas City's Kemper Arena, and did not post a win until beating the Washington Capitals, their expansion brethren, in their tenth contest. With 41 points in their inaugural season, the Scouts finished last in the Smythe Division; only the Capitals had fewer points in the NHL. Kansas City fell to 36 points the following season, and had a 27-game winless streak, three short of the NHL record, which was set when the 1980–81 Winnipeg Jets went 30 games without a win. The Scouts had difficulty drawing fans to home games, and National Hockey League Players' Association (NHLPA) leader Alan Eagleson publicly expressed concerns about whether Scouts players would be paid.

After two seasons in Kansas City, the franchise moved to Denver and was renamed the Colorado Rockies. It played at the McNichols Sports Arena. The team won its first game as the Rockies, 4–2, against the Toronto Maple Leafs. The Rockies were in position to qualify for the playoffs 60 games into the 1976–77 season, but a streak of 18 games without a win caused them to fall from contention. The Rockies ended the campaign last in the division with a 20–46–14 record and 54 points, and improved to 59 points the next season. Despite having the sixth-worst record in the League, the Rockies beat out the Vancouver Canucks for second in the division by two points and gained a playoff berth. The Philadelphia Flyers eliminated the Rockies from the playoffs in the preliminary round.

A lack of stability continually plagued the team. In their first eight years, the Scouts/Rockies went through ten coaches, none lasting two full seasons.

The franchise never won more than 22 games and did not return to the playoffs after 1977–78 in its six seasons in Colorado. Before the 1978–79 season, the team was sold to New Jersey trucking tycoon Arthur Imperatore, who intended to move the team to his home state. The plan was criticized because three other NHL teams already played in the region. In any event, their intended home in the New Jersey Meadowlands was still under construction, and there was no nearby facility suitable even for temporary use; the franchise ultimately stayed in Denver. In 1979, the team hired Don Cherry as head coach and featured forward Lanny McDonald. The Rockies still posted the worst record in the NHL, and Cherry was fired after the season.

After two more years in Denver, the Rockies were sold on May 27, 1982, to a group headed by Jersey City native John McMullen (who also owned Major League Baseball's Houston Astros). McMullen moved the franchise to New Jersey, and was required to compensate the three existing teams in the region – the New York Islanders, New York Rangers, and Flyers – for encroaching on their territory.

=== New Jersey ===
==== 1982–1993: Building the foundation ====
The mythological Jersey Devil was the inspiration for the team's name

More than 10,000 people voted in a contest to select a new name for the team. On June 30, 1982, the team was renamed the New Jersey Devils, after the legend of the Jersey Devil, a creature that allegedly inhabited the Pine Barrens of South Jersey. Placed in the Wales Conference's Patrick Division, the team began play in East Rutherford, New Jersey, at the Brendan Byrne Arena, later renamed the Continental Airlines Arena and then the Izod Center, which they called home through the 2006–07 season. Their first game ended in a 3–3 tie against the Pittsburgh Penguins, with their first goal scored by Don Lever. Their first win, a 3–2 victory, came in New Jersey over the Rangers. The team finished with a 17–49–14 record, three points above last place in the Patrick Division.

In the following season, on November 19, 1983, the Devils were criticized by Wayne Gretzky after a 13–4 loss to the Edmonton Oilers. In a post-game interview, Gretzky said that the Devils were "putting a Mickey Mouse operation on the ice." Later, Gretzky said that his comment was "blown out of proportion." Many Devils fans wore Mickey Mouse apparel when the Oilers returned to New Jersey on January 15, 1984, despite a 5–4 loss. Also in the 1983–84 season, the Devils hosted the annual NHL All-Star Game. New Jersey's Chico Resch was the winning goaltender, and Devils defenseman Joe Cirella tallied a goal as the Wales Conference beat the Campbell Conference 7–6. Overall, the team achieved little success. Head coach Bill MacMillan was fired 20 games into the season, whereupon Tom McVie was named the new coach. The Devils won only 17 games and after the season, Doug Carpenter succeeded McVie.

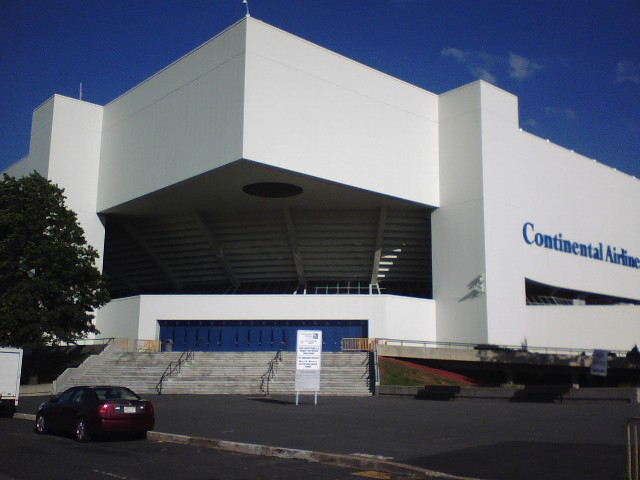
The Devils' first home venue in New Jersey was Brendan Byrne Arena (pictured in 2006 after being renamed).

On January 22, 1987, a massive blizzard hit the New York metropolitan area resulting in only 334 fans attending the game between the Devils and the Calgary Flames at Brendan Byrne Arena where the Devils rallied to win 7–5. The Devils officially recognized the fans that made the journey to the game the "334 Club". The fans received a letter that read, "You are hereby inducted and given lifetime membership to a club that cannot grow – the 334 Club".

The Devils assembled a core of players that included John MacLean, Bruce Driver, Ken Daneyko, Kirk Muller and Pat Verbeek, with Resch as their goaltender. Their record improved each season between 1983–84 and 1986–87. However, they were unable to reach the playoffs. Despite their improvement, the Devils remained last in the Patrick Division in 1985–86 and 1986–87. McMullen hired Providence College athletic director Lou Lamoriello as team president in April 1987. To gain greater control over franchise operations, Lamoriello appointed himself general manager before the 1987–88 season.

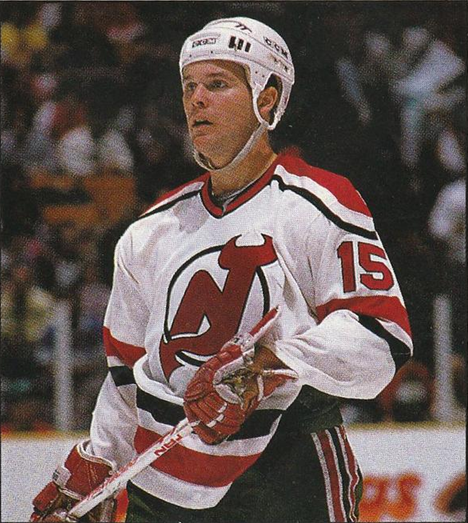
John MacLean was a cornerstone of the Devils during the 1980s and 1990s, becoming the first Devils player to score 700 points with the franchise

The 1987–88 Devils garnered the franchise's first winning record. On the final day of the regular season, they were tied with their rivals, the Rangers, for the final playoff spot in the Patrick Division. After New York defeated the Quebec Nordiques 3–0, the Devils needed to defeat the Chicago Blackhawks for a postseason berth. The Devils were trailing 3–2 midway through the third period when John MacLean tied the game, and with 2:39 left in overtime, he added the winning goal. Although the Rangers and Devils both finished with 82 points, the Devils had two more wins, sending them to the playoffs for the first time in franchise history as the New Jersey Devils. The team made it all the way to the conference finals in the 1988 Stanley Cup playoffs, but lost to the Boston Bruins in seven games. In that series, head coach Jim Schoenfeld verbally abused referee Don Koharski after the third game in the Devils' 6–1 loss. During the exchange, Koharski fell and Schoenfeld said to him "Good, 'cause you fell, you fat pig! Have another doughnut! Have another doughnut!" Schoenfeld was given a suspension by the NHL, but due to a favorable court order, he was able to coach in the fourth game of the series. In protest, referee Dave Newell and linesmen Gord Broseker and Ray Scapinello refused to work the game. Three off-ice officials – Paul McInnis, Jim Sullivan and Vin Godleski – were tracked down to work the game. After the injunction was lifted, Schoenfeld's suspension was imposed in the following game.

In the next season, the Devils once again slipped below .500 and missed the playoffs. Among the postseason player changes Lamoriello made in the off-season was the signing of two Soviet stars – Viacheslav Fetisov and Sergei Starikov. The Devils drafted Fetisov years earlier in the 1983 NHL entry draft, but the Soviet Government did not allow Fetisov, who was a member of the national team, to leave the country. Shortly after, the Devils signed Fetisov's defense partner, Alexei Kasatonov.

The team changed coaches midway through each of the next two seasons. Schoenfeld was replaced with John Cunniff in 1989–90, and Tom McVie was hired midway through the 1990–91 season and helmed the team through its third-straight division semifinals' elimination in 1991–92. Herb Brooks, who coached the 1980 U.S. Olympic "Miracle on Ice" team, was brought in for the 1992–93 season, but when the team yet again was eliminated in the division semifinals, he was fired and replaced by former Montreal Canadiens head coach Jacques Lemaire.

==== 1993–2000: A Championship franchise ====
Under Lemaire, the team played during the 1993–94 regular season as members of the Eastern Conference's Atlantic Division (with the NHL renaming its divisions to better reflect geography that season) with a lineup that included defensemen Scott Stevens, Scott Niedermayer and Ken Daneyko; forwards Stéphane Richer, John MacLean, Bobby Holík and Claude Lemieux; and goaltenders Chris Terreri and Martin Brodeur, the latter goaltender was honored as the NHL's top rookie with the Calder Memorial Trophy. The Devils scored 330 times in the regular season and set a franchise record with 106 points, second behind the New York Rangers in the Atlantic Division. The Devils and Rangers met in a conference finals match-up, which went seven games. Going into game 6 in New Jersey, the Devils led the series three games to two. Before the game, Rangers captain Mark Messier guaranteed that the Rangers would win game 6. Messier led his team back, netting a natural hat-trick to help the Rangers overcome an early 2–0 Devils lead and force a decisive contest. In game 7, the Devils' Valeri Zelepukin tied the score at 1–1 with 7.7 seconds remaining, but the Devils were defeated in double overtime on a goal by Stéphane Matteau.

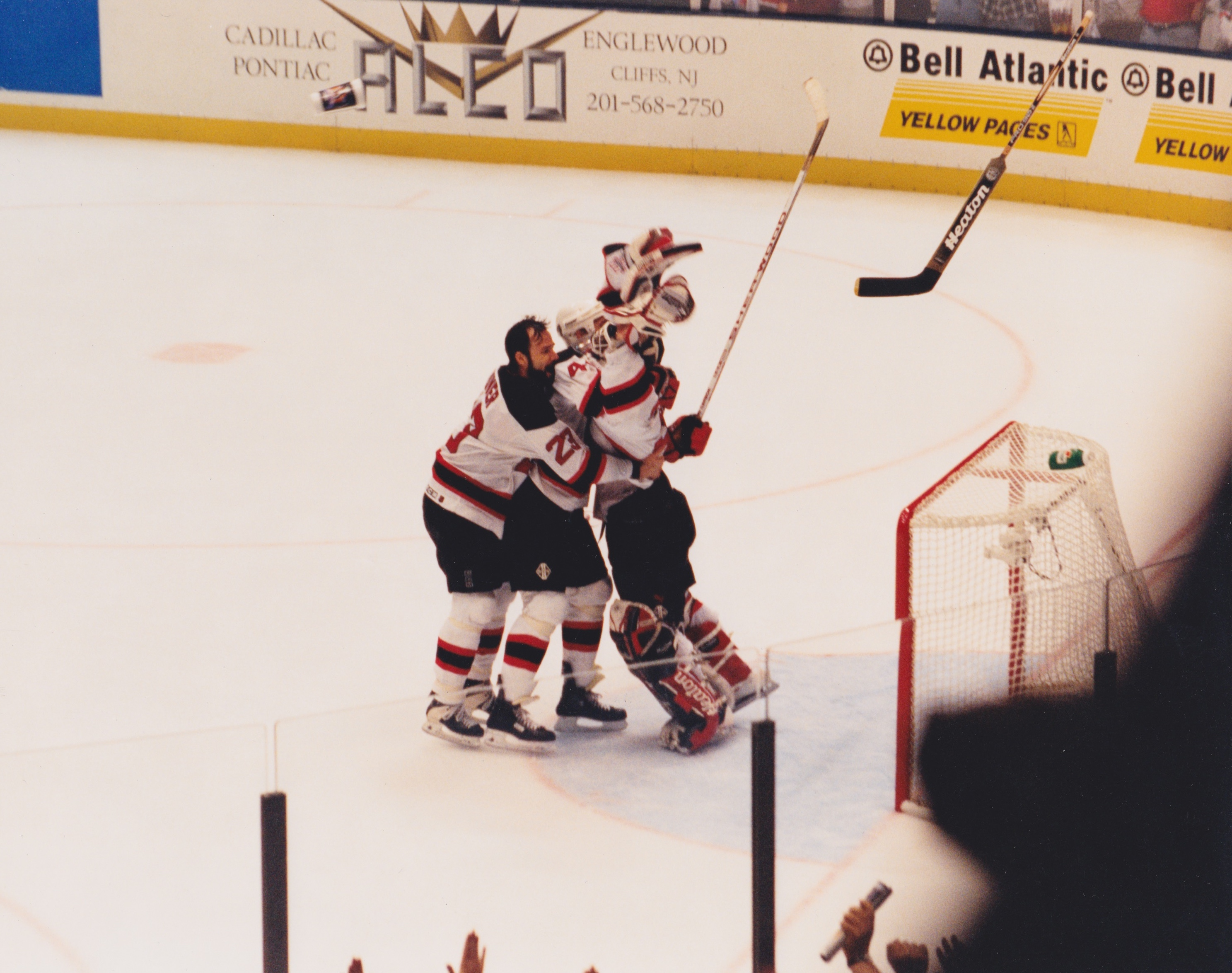
The Devils celebrate moments after defeating the Detroit Red Wings in the 1995 Stanley Cup Final. The victory brought the club its first Stanley Cup.

Despite the setback, the team returned to the conference finals during the lockout-shortened 1994–95 season and defeated the Philadelphia Flyers four games to two. They swept the heavily favored Detroit Red Wings to win the team's first-ever Stanley Cup, as they brought the Cup across the Hudson River from New York, after the Rangers had won it the year before. The 1994–95 Devils team became the first to give the players a day with the Stanley Cup, a tradition that lives on with each Cup winner. Claude Lemieux was awarded the Conn Smythe Trophy as playoffs MVP. The success came amid constant rumors that the team would move for the third time in its history to Nashville. Staring at the prospect of losing the team, the state agreed to fund a renovation of the Devils' arena. Nashville eventually received an NHL franchise three years later, when the Nashville Predators joined the league as an expansion team.

The Devils missed the playoffs by two points the following season, with a 37–33–12 record and finishing twelfth overall in the league. While they finished with more points than all but three teams in the Western Conference, they were beaten by the Tampa Bay Lightning for the eighth and final playoff spot in the East after a 5–2 loss to the Ottawa Senators on the last day of the regular season. It marked the first time in 26 years that a defending Cup champion failed to reach the playoffs. For the remainder of the decade the Devils won the Atlantic Division and finished as the first overall team in the Eastern Conference all three seasons, but were unable to make a deep playoff run. Despite posting 104 points in the 1996–97 season and 107 in 1997–98, they were ousted by the Rangers 4–1 in the conference semifinals of the 1997 playoffs and in the conference quarterfinals by the Senators four games to two in 1998 playoffs. Lemaire resigned after that season and was replaced by assistant coach Robbie Ftorek. However, the next season ended as the previous one, with a conference quarterfinals' loss, this time to the Pittsburgh Penguins in seven games.

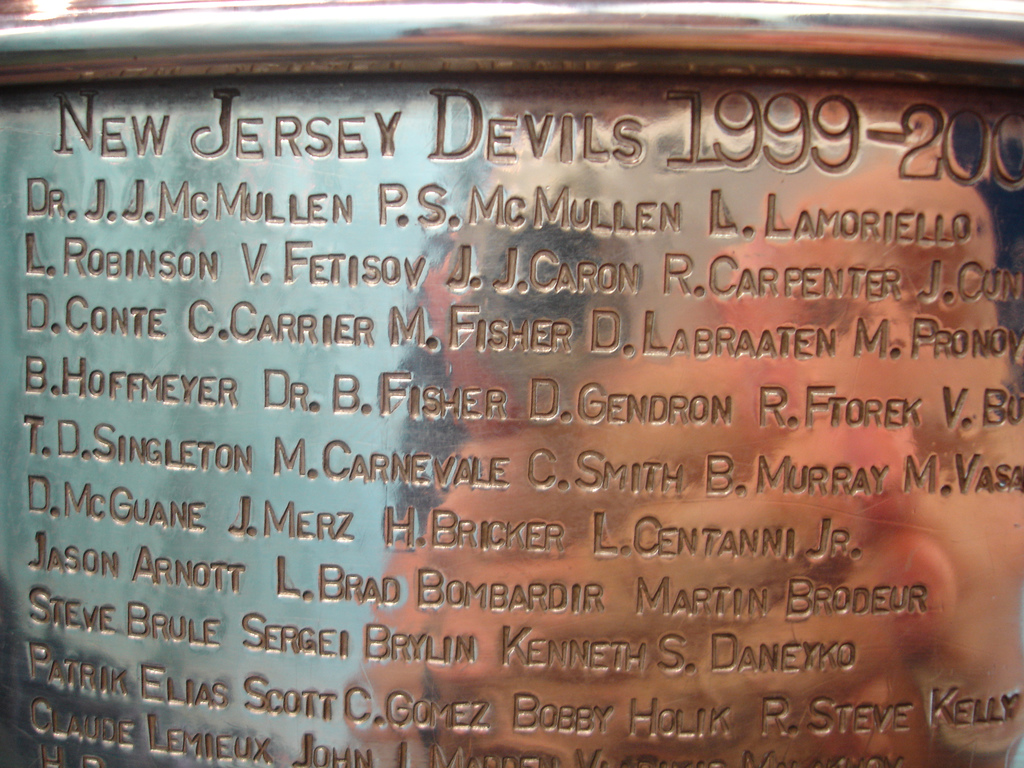
The 1999–2000 Devils engraved on the Stanley Cup. The club won its second Stanley Cup that season.

Late in the 1999–2000 season, Lamoriello made the decision to fire Ftorek and replace him with assistant coach Larry Robinson, which the New York Post's Mark Everson described as "pure panic" at the prospect of another early-round playoff elimination. The Devils were in position to reach the playoffs, but Lamoriello reacted to a stretch of 17 games in which the team went 5–10–2. New Jersey followed the move by defeating the Florida Panthers, the Toronto Maple Leafs and the Philadelphia Flyers during the postseason to make the 2000 Stanley Cup Final. In the Stanley Cup Final, the Devils reached the top again, defeating the defending champion Dallas Stars in six games to win the Stanley Cup for the second time. Veterans such as Stevens, Holík, Niedermayer, Daneyko, and Brodeur were joined by new players acquired in the intervening five years, including Patrik Eliáš, Petr Sýkora, Jason Arnott, Alexander Mogilny and Calder Trophy recipient Scott Gomez. The Devils' second championship run included a come-from-behind victory in the conference finals. They trailed the Flyers three games to one, but rebounded to win three straight games and the series. This was the first time in conference finals history that a 3–1 series deficit was erased. This series featured a hit that captain Scott Stevens laid on Flyers center Eric Lindros in the seventh game, which effectively ended Lindros' career in Philadelphia. Stevens was named the winner of the Conn Smythe Trophy, as the Devils clinched the Stanley Cup on Arnott's goal in double-overtime of game 6 in Dallas.

In 2000, McMullen sold the team to Puck Holdings, an affiliate of YankeeNets (now Yankee Global Enterprises) for $176 million. The owners wanted to program Devils games on what eventually became the YES Network and move the team to a new arena in Newark. Neither of these proposals became reality under Puck Holdings' ownership. For the start of the next season, Lamoriello was appointed CEO of both the Devils and the New Jersey Nets of the National Basketball Association (NBA). He remained at the helm of the basketball team until it was sold with the intention of moving it to Brooklyn in 2004, a move that did not come to pass at that time.

==== 2001–2007: Third Cup and lockout ====
Led by the Eliáš–Arnott–Sýkora line (the A Line) on offense and the goaltending of Brodeur (who appeared in a record 97 games between the regular season and playoffs), the Devils won their division, finished first overall in the East, led the entire league in scoring, and reached the Stanley Cup Final for the second-straight year in 2001. They lost the series to the Colorado Avalanche in seven games despite holding a 3–2 series lead after game 5. John Madden became the first player in franchise history to win the Frank J. Selke Trophy for top defensive forward. In the 2001–02 season, they were expected to be contenders once again, and they finished the season as the third-best team in the Atlantic Division, with 95 points. The Devils entered the playoffs as a sixth seed, but lost in the conference quarterfinals to the third-seeded Carolina Hurricanes.

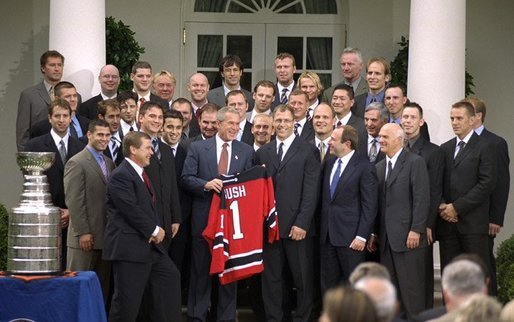
The Devils present President George W. Bush with a jersey after winning the 2003 Stanley Cup championship.

Before the 2002–03 season, the Devils traded A-Line stars Arnott and Sýkora in two separate transactions. Arnott and Randy McKay were sent to Dallas to acquire forwards Joe Nieuwendyk and Jamie Langenbrunner, while Sýkora was part of a package to receive Jeff Friesen from Anaheim. The revitalized forward group would ultimately lead the team to first in the Atlantic Division with 108 points. Their playoff run included victories over Boston and Tampa Bay in the first two rounds, followed by a game seven conference finals series victory over the Presidents' Trophy-winning Ottawa Senators; decided by a goal from Friesen in the final three minutes. In the Stanley Cup Final, the Devils faced the Mighty Ducks of Anaheim in a back-and-forth battle, as both teams won all of their home games. After defeating the Mighty Ducks in the seventh game of the finals in New Jersey, the franchise won their third Stanley Cup. After the series, Daneyko, a long-time fan favorite who spent his entire two-decade career with the Devils, announced his retirement. Brodeur was awarded the Vezina Trophy as outstanding goaltender in the regular season for the first time in his career, having won 41 games in the regular season to top the NHL.

In the 2003–04 season, Brodeur took home the Vezina Trophy again. Despite losing team captain Scott Stevens in the 38th game of the season to a concussion, the Devils finished second in the Atlantic Division with 100 points. With the sixth seed in the Stanley Cup playoffs, the Devils lost in the conference quarterfinals to the Philadelphia Flyers four games to one. In March 2004, near the end of the season, Lehman Brothers executive Jeff Vanderbeek purchased a controlling interest from Puck Holdings and resigned from Lehman Brothers to assume full-time ownership. He had been a minority owner since the 2000 sale. Like Puck Holdings/YankeeNets, Vanderbeek largely left the Devils in Lamoriello's hands.

Vanderbeek was a strong proponent of the proposed arena in Newark, which first received funding from the city council during Puck Holdings' ownership in 2002. After legal battles over both eminent domain and the city's financial participation in the arena project, the final deal was approved by council in October 2004, during the early months of the lockout, and the groundbreaking occurred almost exactly a year later. Nonetheless, in January 2006, financial issues threatened to halt the deal, as the Devils did not provide the city with a required letter of credit until the last possible day.

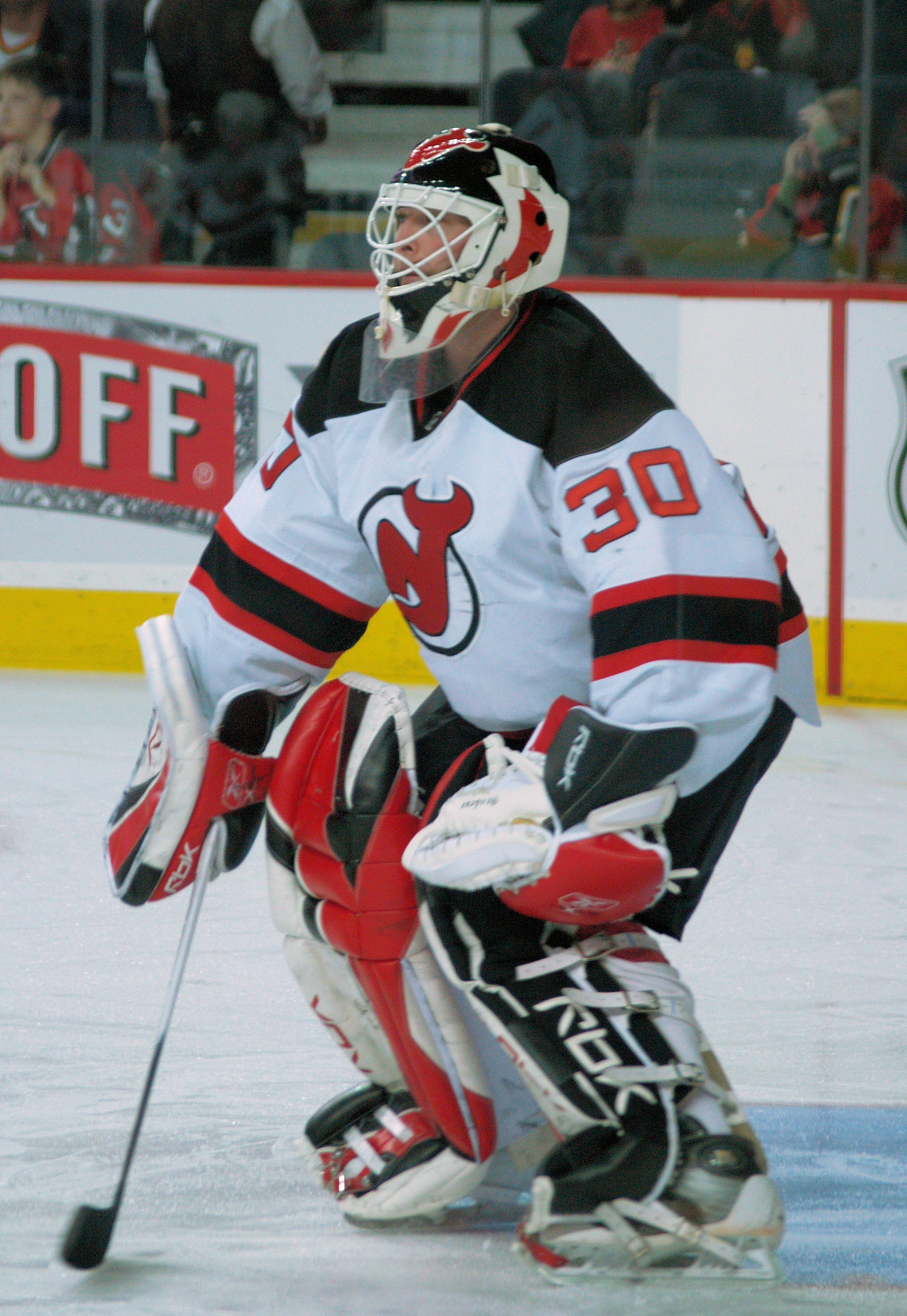
Martin Brodeur led the Devils to three Stanley Cup championships, and is the NHL's all-time leader in goaltender wins, shutouts, and goals by a goaltender.

Though construction was well underway, in late summer 2006, new mayor of Newark Cory Booker promised to reevaluate the deal and considered backing out. In October, Booker conceded there would be "a first-class arena built in the city of Newark, whether we like it or not," and soon after the Devils struck a deal including both property and monetary givebacks that appeased city officials. The arena, which was named the Prudential Center when Newark-based Prudential Financial purchased naming rights in early 2007, opened shortly after the start of the 2007–08 season.

The 2004–05 season was canceled due to the lockout; many Devils players played in European leagues and in the hockey world championships. Patrik Eliáš, who was playing in the Russian Superleague, contracted hepatitis A. Faced with Eliáš's indefinite recovery timetable, plus the loss of defensive stalwarts Scott Niedermayer to free agency and Scott Stevens to retirement, Lamoriello signed veteran defenseman Dan McGillis and two former Devils, winger Alexander Mogilny and defenseman Vladimir Malakhov, none of whom finished the season on the ice. In July 2005, the team announced that head coach Pat Burns would not return for the 2005–06 season after being diagnosed with cancer for the second time in little more than a year. Assistant coach Larry Robinson, the team's head coach from 2000 to 2002, was promoted to start the season.

The Devils struggled early in the 2005–06 season, ending the 2005 calendar year with a 16–18–5 record. Robinson resigned as head coach on December 19, and Lamoriello moved down to the bench. Once Eliáš returned from his bout with hepatitis, the team quickly turned around, finishing 46–27–9 after a season-ending 11-game winning streak capped with a 4–3 win over the Montreal Canadiens. During that final victory, which clinched the Devils' sixth division title, Brian Gionta set a new team record for goals in a season with 48, topping Pat Verbeek's 46. The win streak to close the year was also an NHL record. The Devils swept the Rangers in four games in the conference quarterfinals, and were then eliminated by the Carolina Hurricanes in five games in the conference semifinals.

In the off-season, the Devils hired former Montreal Canadiens head coach Claude Julien to replace Lamoriello behind the bench. However, in the last week of the 2006–07 season, with just three games left, Julien was fired, and Lamoriello once again reprised his coaching role. The Devils went on to win their seventh Atlantic Division title and earn the second seed in the Eastern Conference after finishing ahead of the Pittsburgh Penguins by two points. They then defeated the Tampa Bay Lightning in six games in the conference quarterfinals, but fell to the Ottawa Senators in the conference semifinals in five. The conclusion of the series marked the end of the Devils' time at the Continental Airlines Arena.

==== 2007–2013: Move to Newark and return to Stanley Cup Final ====
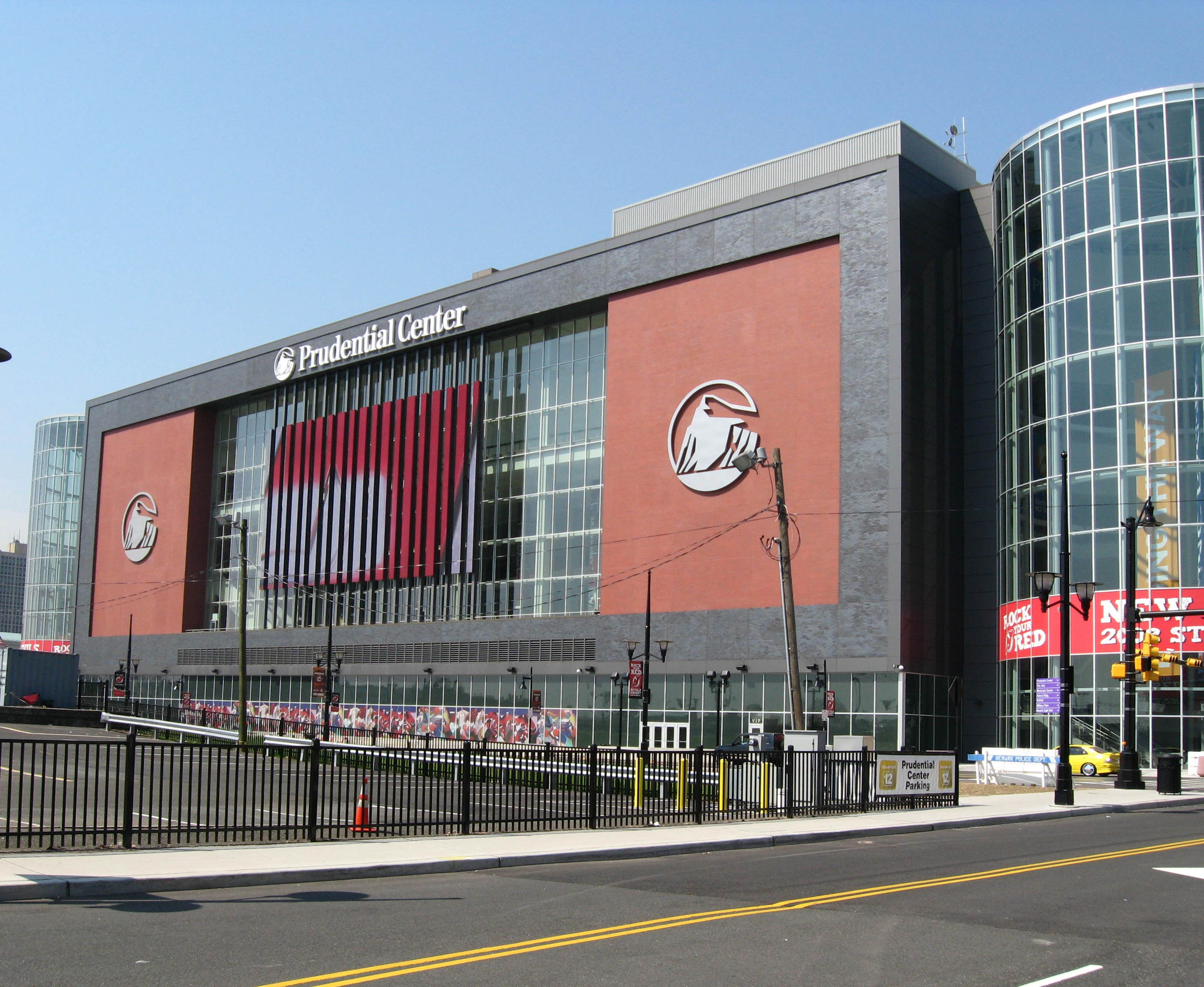
The Devils moved to Newark, in October 2007, opening a new arena, known as the Prudential Center.

Before the move to Newark, the Devils hired their 14th coach in a 26-season span, Brent Sutter. As the Devils' pre-season came to an end, prospects Nicklas Bergfors and David Clarkson made the final roster. The Devils opened their new arena, the Prudential Center, on October 27, 2007, against Ottawa after opening the season with a nine-game road trip. The game ended with a 4–1 win for Ottawa. In the last game of the 2007–08 season against the Rangers, the Devils won in a shootout, giving them home-ice advantage over the Rangers in the playoffs. The Devils lost the series against the Rangers 4–1, losing all three games at home. Brodeur won the Vezina Trophy for the fourth time in five years for his performance in the regular season.

For the 2008–09 season, the Devils signed Brian Rolston and Bobby Holik, both making their second stints with the team. The Devils were forced to play without Brodeur for over three months after he tore a biceps tendon in November, but strong play by backup goaltender Scott Clemmensen kept the Devils atop the Atlantic Division. After his return, Brodeur broke Patrick Roy's record for regular season wins on March 17, 2009, with his 552nd victory, while Patrik Eliáš became the franchise's all-time leading scorer with his 702nd point. The season also served as a break-out year for 24-year-old Zach Parise, who led the team with an impressive 45 goals and 94 points. In the conference quarterfinals of the 2009 playoffs, the Devils were eliminated in a game 7 loss in which the Hurricanes scored two goals in the last minute and 20 seconds to erase a 3–2 Devils lead.

In the off-season, the Devils announced that Sutter was stepping down from his position, citing personal and family reasons; he became the coach of the Calgary Flames shortly afterward. Jacques Lemaire returned to the head coach position. During the 2009–10 season, the Devils made a trade to acquire star left wing Ilya Kovalchuk from the Atlanta Thrashers. The Devils had their 12th 100-point season in their last 15 attempts. They finished the season in first place in the Atlantic Division, second in the Eastern Conference, and played in the postseason for the 13th-straight time. Their seeding matched them up against Philadelphia in the conference quarterfinals, and they were eliminated four games to one.

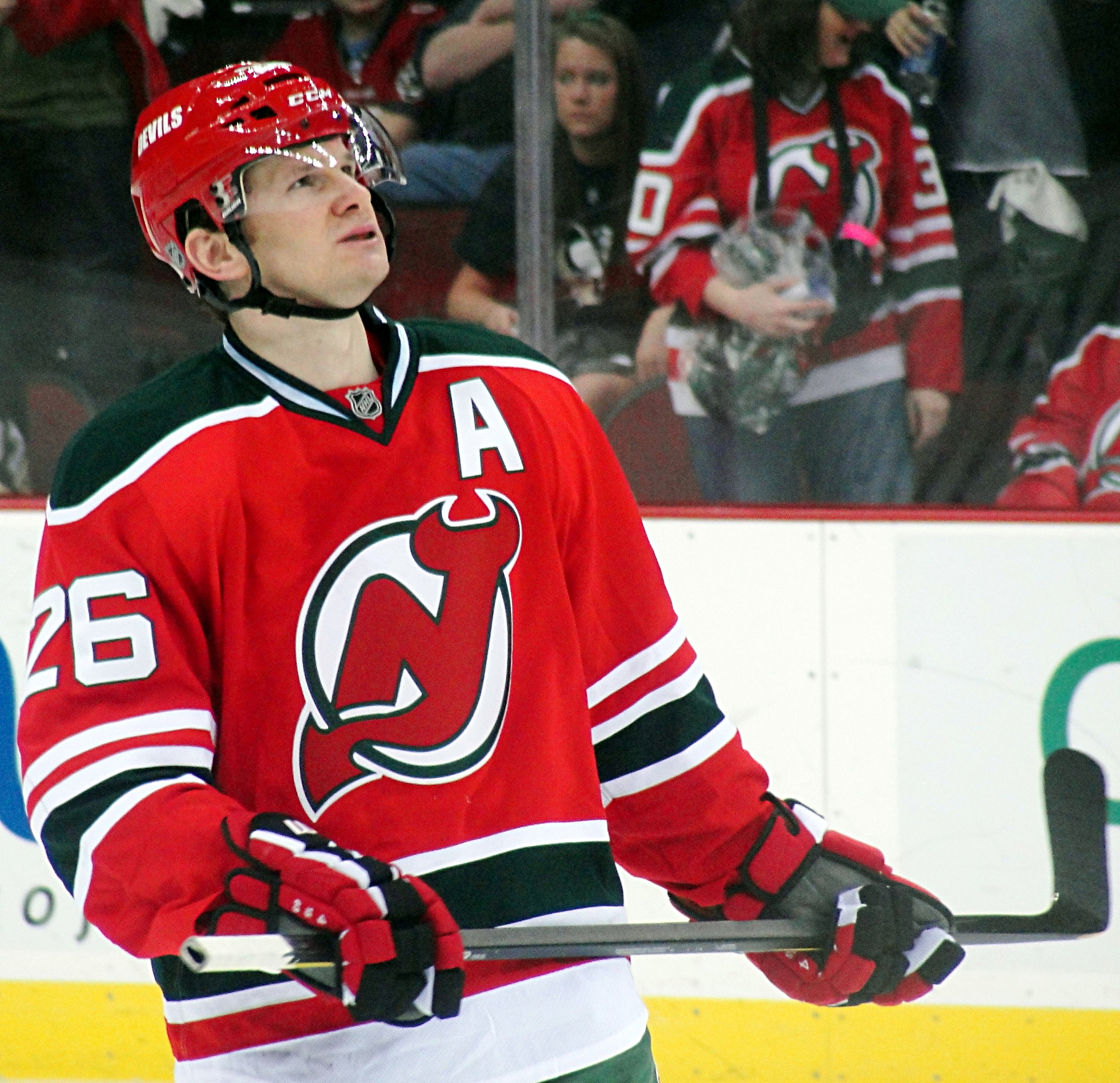
Patrik Eliáš is the Devils all time leader in games played, points, goals, and assists.

After Lemaire retired from coaching, the Devils announced that the team's all-time leading scorer, John MacLean, would become their new head coach. During the off-season, the Devils signed Kovalchuk to a 15-year, $100 million contract, keeping him in New Jersey until the conclusion of the 2024–25 season; the move came after the NHL had rejected a 17-year contract for allegedly circumventing the NHL Collective Bargaining Agreement (CBA). The League still penalized the Devils for trying to circumvent the NHL salary cap with a money fine, a third-round draft pick in 2011 and one future first-round pick within the next four seasons. MacLean led the team to a record of 9–22–2, and after sitting in last place in the NHL on December 23, he was removed in favor of Lemaire, coming out of retirement for his third stint as head coach of the Devils and second in less than two seasons. Just a few days later, struggling captain Jamie Langenbrunner was traded back to Dallas after nine seasons with New Jersey. With the injured Parise missing most of the regular season, the team struggled offensively, finishing last in goals scored. Despite this, the Devils managed a mid-season turnaround, winning 22 out of the next 25 games. However, the Devils still failed to qualify for the playoffs for the first time since 1996, ending their 13-year streak.

In the 2011 off-season, Lemaire once again retired and was replaced by former Florida Panthers head coach Peter DeBoer. DeBoer's new system helped develop a strong offense, which had seven 40-point scorers by the season's end and broke an NHL record for the best regular season penalty kill since before the expansion era. Four players – Kovalchuk, Eliáš, Clarkson and newly named captain Zach Parise – scored 30 or more goals, with Kovalchuk and Eliáš also finishing the season among the NHL's top ten-point scorers. Rookie forward Adam Henrique totaled 51 points and earned a Calder Trophy nomination for rookie of the year. The Devils entered the 2012 playoffs as the sixth seed in the Eastern Conference. They defeated Southeast champions Florida before overcoming both divisional rivals, the Flyers and Rangers, to win the conference and return to the Stanley Cup Final after nine years. Facing the Los Angeles Kings in the 2012 Stanley Cup Final, the Devils lost the first three games, but won the next two while facing elimination. In game 6, the Kings defeated the Devils and captured the series.

During the 2012 off-season, Zach Parise signed a 13-year, $98 million contract with the Minnesota Wild, leaving the Devils after one season as team captain. The Devils entered the lockout-shortened season with Bryce Salvador as their new captain. The team failed to repeat its success of the previous year, finishing 19–19–10 in 48 games and missing the playoffs.

==== 2013–present: Harris–Blitzer era ====
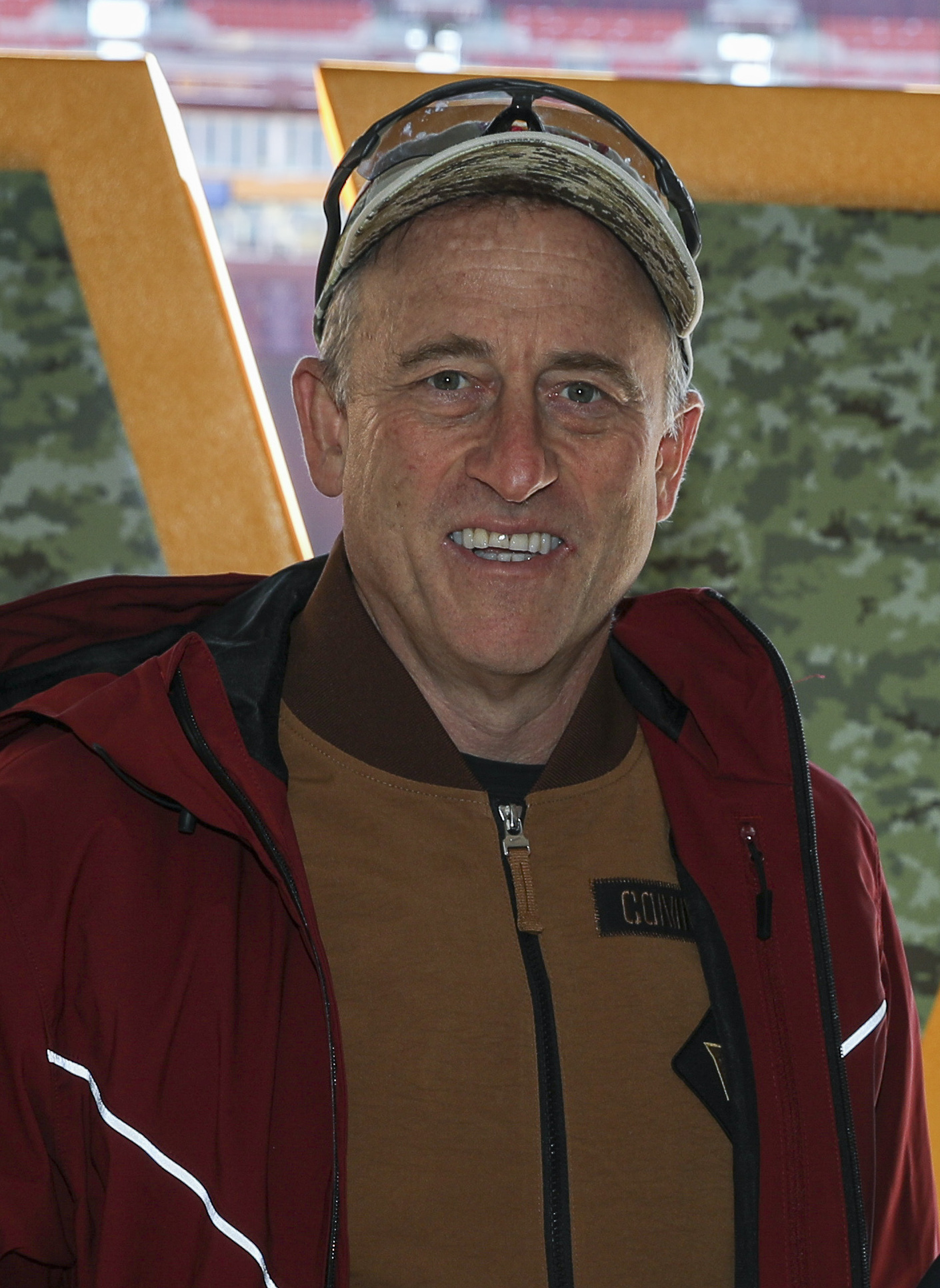
Josh Harris (pictured) and David Blitzer purchased the team and the Prudential Center from Jeff Vanderbeek for $320 million in 2013.

The Devils' longtime financial struggles worsened during the 2012–13 season, and at one point the team needed to borrow $30 million to meet their payroll. This prompted owner Jeff Vanderbeek to sell the team. Andrew Barroway, the attorney who loaned the team the $30 million, was one potential buyer. Ultimately, the team was sold to Philadelphia 76ers owners Josh Harris and David Blitzer for over $320 million. The sale was formally announced on August 15, 2013. During the off-season, Kovalchuk announced he would retire from the NHL, expressing a desire to return home to Russia along with his family. In addition, 30-goal scorer Clarkson also left the Devils, signing a seven-year deal with Toronto. With the departures of Parise and now Kovalchuk and Clarkson, the Devils were in desperate need of offensive help. In an effort to fill the void, the Devils signed veteran Jaromír Jágr, who despite being 41 years old, led the team scoring in the 2013–14 season. During the 2013 NHL entry draft, hosted in Newark, the Devils acquired goaltender Cory Schneider from Vancouver in exchange for the Devils' first-round draft pick. Schneider split goaltending duties with the 41-year-old Brodeur, which led to some controversy over who should be the starting goaltender for the Devils. Despite Schneider's 1.97 goals against average leading the NHL, the Devils missed the playoffs by five points due to lagging offensive production. In the 2014 off-season, the Devils saw the departure of NHL all-time wins leader Martin Brodeur, who was not re-signed and subsequently joined the St. Louis Blues. Brodeur, who had spent his entire 21-year career with the Devils, played only seven games with St. Louis before announcing his retirement.

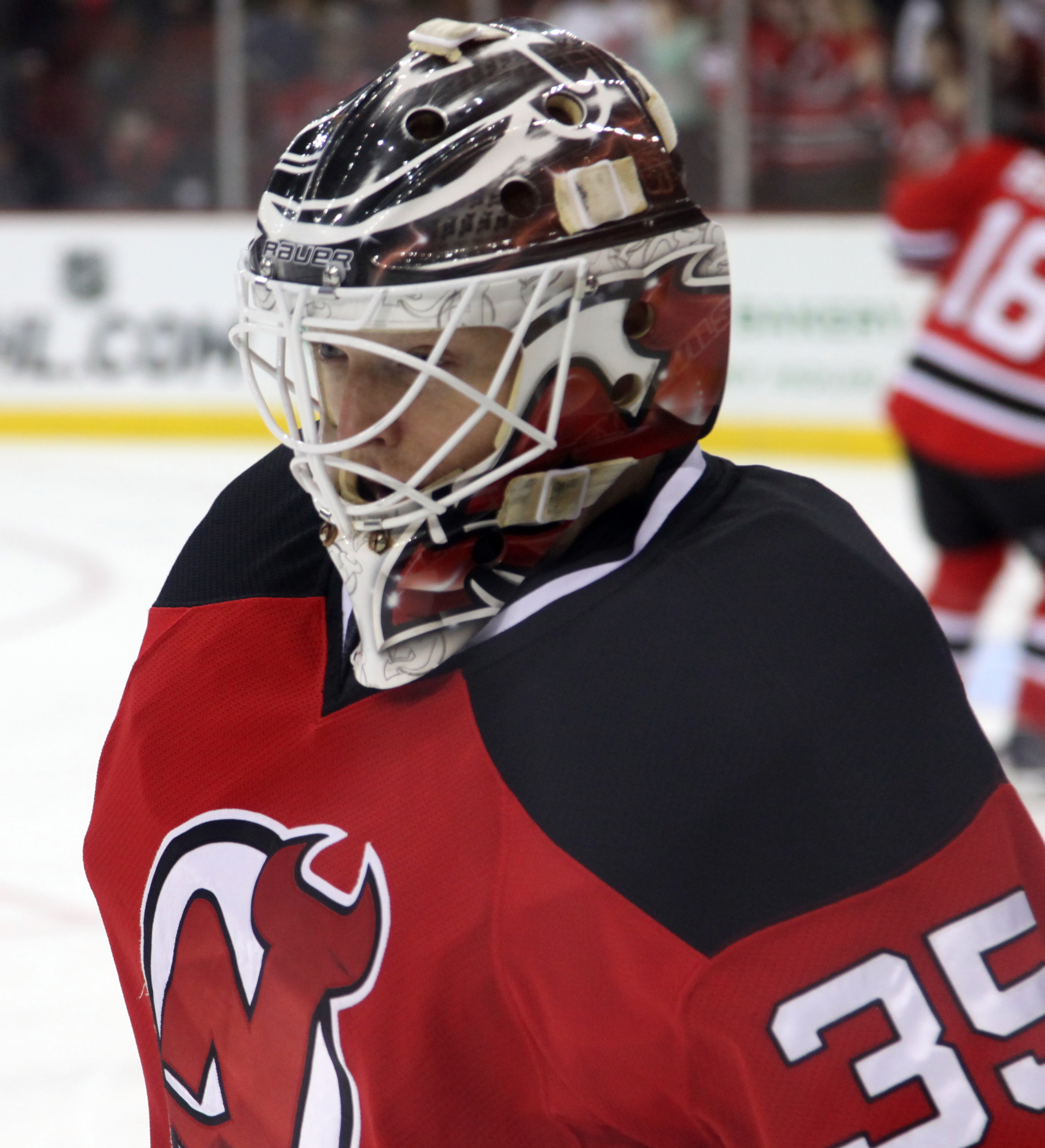
During the 2013 NHL entry draft, the Devils acquired Cory Schneider from the Vancouver Canucks in exchange for their first-round draft pick.

The 2014–15 season opened with the Devils' roster suffering with injuries, and consequently the team accumulated losses. On December 26, Peter DeBoer was fired from the head coach position. To replace him, Lamoriello invested in two head coaches, former Devils player Scott Stevens (who had been DeBoer's assistant for two years) and Adam Oates, with Lamoriello himself supervising the team during the first months. The Devils finished the season as the sixth-worst team in the League, 20 points away from a playoff spot and with just one victory in the last 11 games.

During the 2015 off-season, Ray Shero was named the Devils' new general manager, and John Hynes was named as the new head coach. Among Shero's first moves as general manager was trading with the Anaheim Ducks to acquire Kyle Palmieri, who would become a key forward for the Devils in future seasons. Lou Lamoriello resigned as team president and became the general manager of the Toronto Maple Leafs, replacing Dave Nonis, who was fired at the end of the season. In the 2015–16 season, the Devils finished seventh in the Metropolitan Division with 84 points, missing the playoffs for the fourth consecutive season. That off-season, the Devils attempted to bolster its forward strength in a blockbuster trade with the Edmonton Oilers, sending defenseman and former first-round draft pick Adam Larsson to Edmonton in exchange for Taylor Hall. This did not turn the Devils' fortunes, and the team finished in last place in the Eastern Conference the following season with 70 points; this was the first time that they finished last in the conference since the 1985–86 season. However, they won the ensuing draft lottery to secure the first overall selection in the 2017 NHL entry draft, which they used to select center Nico Hischier.

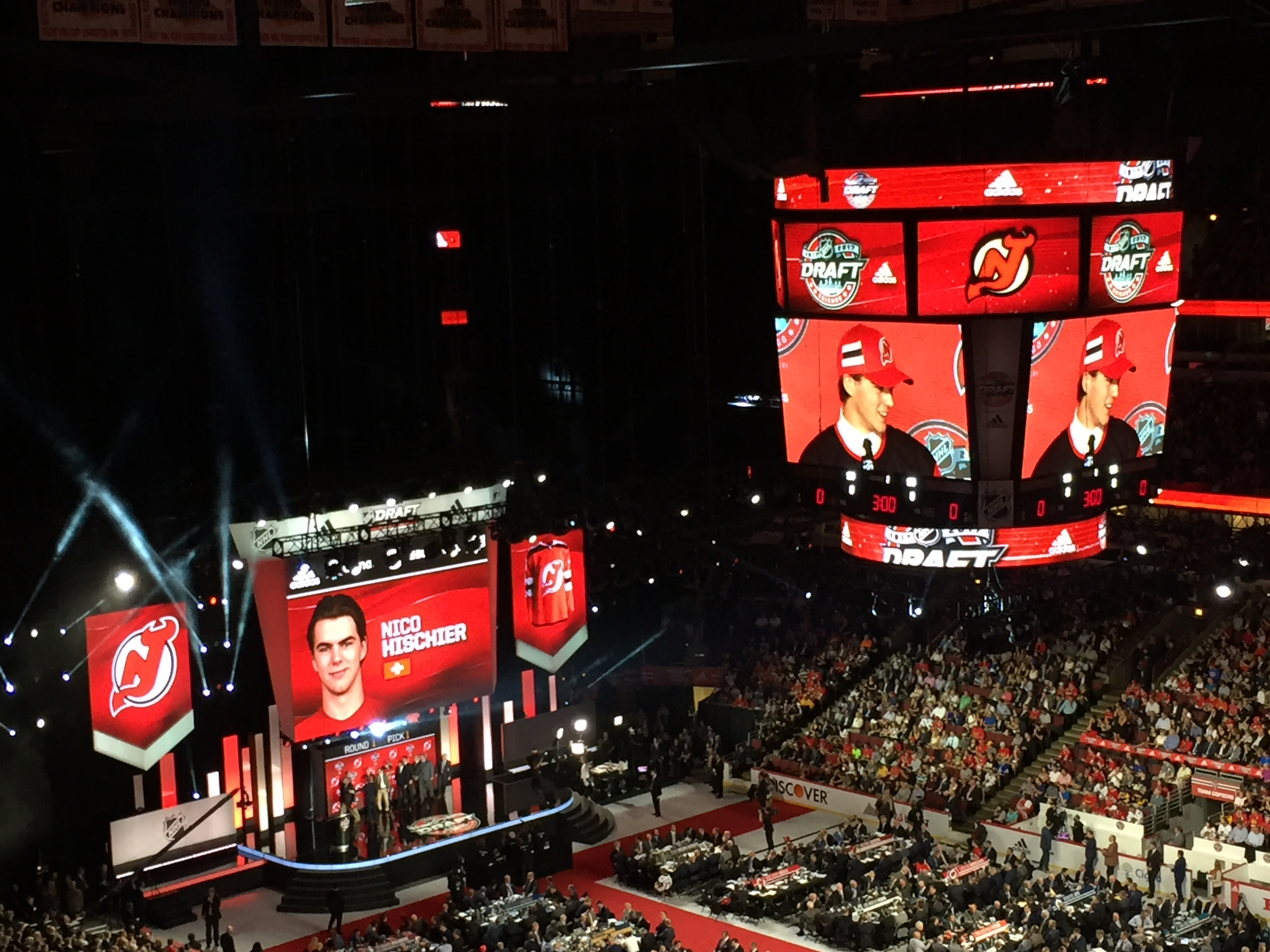
The Devils drafted Nico Hischier with the first overall selection in the 2017 NHL entry draft.

In the 2017–18 season, the team recorded its best start in franchise history, going 9–2–0 in their first 11 games of the season. Hall set the franchise record for points in consecutive games, recording a point in 26 straight appearances. Hall finished the season sixth in the NHL in points (93) and earned nominations for the Hart Memorial Trophy for the league's most valuable player and the Ted Lindsay Award for the NHL's most outstanding player. On the back of Hall's impressive performance and with aid from goaltender Keith Kinkaid and rookie Hischier, the Devils clinched a playoff spot for the first time since the 2011–12 season with a win over the Toronto Maple Leafs. The Devils' playoff run ended in the first round where they lost 4–1 to the Tampa Bay Lightning in a seven-game series. After the conclusion of the playoffs, Hall became the first player in franchise history to win the Hart Memorial Trophy.

The Devils failed to return to the playoffs in the 2018–19 season as they struggled. Plagued by injuries, including reigning league MVP Hall being sidelined with a knee injury for nearly 50 games; the Devils finished 15th in the Eastern Conference with 72 points. In the subsequent draft lottery, the team received the first overall selection in the 2019 NHL entry draft for the second time in three years. The Devils used this pick to select Jack Hughes first overall.

In the 2019 off-season, the Devils acquired P. K. Subban, Nikita Gusev, and Wayne Simmonds. The Devils started the 2019–20 season with a six-game losing streak, going 0–4–2, and after having a 9–13–4 record in December, head coach John Hynes was fired and replaced by assistant coach Alain Nasreddine in the interim. However, the Devils continued to struggle and Hall was traded to the Arizona Coyotes, longtime captain Andy Greene was traded to the New York Islanders, and Wayne Simmonds was traded to the Buffalo Sabres. Shero was fired on January 12, 2020, and replaced by interim general manager Tom Fitzgerald. On March 12, the regular season was suspended due to the COVID-19 pandemic. Then, on May 26, the regular season was declared finished and the Devils missed the playoffs for the second year in a row. On July 9, Lindy Ruff was named the Devils' head coach; Nasreddine was retained as an assistant coach. In the off-season, the Devils also attempted to find a permanent goaltending solution by signing longtime Chicago Blackhawks netminder Corey Crawford; however, Crawford retired before the 2020–21 season, never having played a game with New Jersey. After a good start with great play from goaltender Mackenzie Blackwood and center Jack Hughes, the Devils would suffer an outbreak of COVID-19, which sidelined the team for two weeks. Once they returned, they struggled, and Palmieri was traded alongside longest-tenured Devil Travis Zajac to the Islanders. The Devils would go on to miss the playoffs for the third consecutive season.

Jack Hughes was drafted with the first overall pick in 2019, and emerged as a multiple time All-Star

During the 2021 off-season, the Devils signed free agent defenseman Dougie Hamilton from the Carolina Hurricanes. General manager Tom Fitzgerald would also succeed in his goal to sign a backup goaltender and top 6 winger by signing veterans Jonathan Bernier and Tomáš Tatar. However, the 2021–22 season fared to be no better as the Devils once again missed the playoffs. At the end of the season, Nasreddine was not tendered a contract extension, and Mark Recchi was fired from his assistant coach position.

In the 2022–23 season, the team rebounded by recording its best regular season in franchise history. Spurred on by a franchise-record 13-game winning streak in October and November, the Devils finished third in the entire league and set a franchise record for wins (52) and points (112). The team's climb from 63 points the prior season to 112 points marked the largest single-season increase by any NHL team in an 82-game season. In addition to a breakout season from newly acquired goaltender Vítek Vaněček, the Devils were led by impressive offensive performances from Hughes, Hischier, Hamilton, and Jesper Bratt. All four players eclipsed the 70-point mark, while Hughes set a franchise record for most points in a single season by a Devils player with 99 points. Devils general manager Tom Fitzgerald built further on this impressive offensive core by acquiring All-Star forward Timo Meier in a mid-season trade from the San Jose Sharks. In the first round of the 2023 Stanley Cup playoffs, the Devils faced their rivals across the Hudson River, the New York Rangers. After falling behind 2–0 in the series with two home losses, the Devils rebounded to win the series in seven games behind the stellar play of rookie goaltender, Akira Schmid. After advancing to the second round for the first time since 2012, the Devils were defeated by the Carolina Hurricanes in five games.

In the 2023–24 season, the Devils took part in the 2024 Stadium Series at MetLife Stadium on February 17, 2024, defeating the Philadelphia Flyers 6–3 in front of 70,328 fans. The event was the Devils' first game at the Meadowlands since 2007. However, the 2023–24 season turned out to be a disappointing one for the Devils as they missed the playoffs.

The Devils returned to the playoffs in the 2024–25 season, but they fell in the first round to the Hurricanes in five games.

== Season-by-season record ==
This is a partial list of the last five seasons completed by the Devils. For the full season-by-season history, see List of New Jersey Devils seasons

Note: GP = Games played, W = Wins, L = Losses, T = Ties, OTL = Overtime Losses, Pts = Points, GF = Goals for, GA = Goals against

| Season | GP | W | L | OTL | Pts | GF | GA | Finish | Playoffs |
|---|---|---|---|---|---|---|---|---|---|
| 2021–22 | 82 | 27 | 46 | 9 | 63 | 248 | 307 | 7th, Metropolitan | Did not qualify |
| 2022–23 | 82 | 52 | 22 | 8 | 112 | 291 | 226 | 2nd, Metropolitan | Lost in second round, 1–4 (Hurricanes) |
| 2023–24 | 82 | 38 | 39 | 5 | 81 | 264 | 283 | 7th, Metropolitan | Did not qualify |
| 2024–25 | 82 | 42 | 33 | 7 | 91 | 242 | 222 | 3rd, Metropolitan | Lost in first round, 1–4 (Hurricanes) |
| 2025–26 | 82 | 42 | 37 | 3 | 87 | 230 | 254 | 7th, Metropolitan | Did not qualify |

== Team identity ==
=== Jerseys ===
The old green style jerseys used from 1982 to 1992

The jerseys used from 1992 to 2017

The team colors are red, black and white, and they can be seen on both the home and road jerseys. The home jersey, which was the team's road jersey until the NHL swapped home and road colors in 2003, is dominantly red in color. There are three black and white stripes, one across each arm and before the 2017–18 season, one across the waist. The road jersey (the team's former home jersey) is white in color with a similar design, except that the three stripes are black and red. The shoulders are draped with black on both uniforms. Before the 1992–93 season, the uniforms were green and red with slightly different striping, leading some fans to affectionately refer to them as "Christmas colors". The color green was chosen to reflect New Jersey's nickname as "The Garden State" and the New Jersey Pine Barrens, home of the Jersey Devil.

During the Lou Lamoriello era, the Devils refused to join the trend of teams unveiling third jerseys, and continued to do so well after Lamoriello left in 2015. Lamoriello had stated that he did not ever intend to introduce a third jersey for the Devils, saying, "I don't believe in it. I strongly believe that you have to have one identity as a team. We want to create a feeling that our home and away jerseys are special and that it means something special to wear one." Unlike most teams, the Devils kept the same uniform design when the NHL switched to the Rbk Edge jerseys by Reebok for the 2007–08 season.

On August 20, 2009, Lamoriello announced that the Devils would wear their classic red, white and green jerseys on their Saint Patrick's Day 2010 game against the Pittsburgh Penguins. Lamoriello stated, "The original red, green and white jerseys are a part of our history here in New Jersey. We have always been an organization that takes great pride in its tradition. This is something we believe our fans will enjoy for that one special night." Martin Brodeur wore a special replica helmet of the one from his first NHL game. The throwback jerseys continued to be used, including for games on or around St. Patrick's Day over three different seasons and in the 2014 Stadium Series against the Rangers, on January 26.

On June 20, 2017, the Devils revealed updated uniforms for the 2017–18 season. Made by Adidas, the new sweaters are the first major change to the team's look since they replaced green with black. They feature the removal of the stripes on the bottom of the sweater, and also thicker sleeve stripes with equal width bands of white and black.

The Devils wore their classic white, red and green uniforms for four home games in the 2018–19 season.

The Devils rolled out a "Reverse Retro" alternate uniform in collaboration with Adidas during the 2020–21 season. The team used the original uniform template worn from 1982 to 1992, but green served as the base color instead of red.

After eschewing the trend of "third jerseys" under Lou Lamoriello, the Devils finally unveiled a full-time alternate uniform early in the 2021–22 season. This uniform featured a black base and white stripes spread across the shoulders and sleeves. "Jersey" in white script lettering and red drop shadows is stitched in front with lacing at the neck. The uniform was designed by Devils legend Martin Brodeur and was largely influenced by the history of ice hockey in New Jersey. The team wore the "Jersey" jerseys for five seasons officially retiring the alternate uniform at the end of the 2025–26 season.

During the 2022–23 season, the Devils unveiled a new "Reverse Retro" alternate uniform in collaboration with Adidas. The team again used the original uniform template worn from 1982 to 1992, with white as the base color, but with red, navy and gold striping. The color palette was chosen to honor the Devils' previous identities, the Kansas City Scouts and the Colorado Rockies, and the club's 40th anniversary.

In the 2024 Stadium Series, the Devils went with a red and black-based uniform minus the white trim. The "NJ" logo was modified and enlarged without the circle.

=== Logo ===
The Devils' logo is a ligature of the letters "N", and "J", rendered with devil horns at the top of the "J" and a pointed tail at the bottom. The ligature was red with a green outline when the team began playing in New Jersey, but the outline color was changed to black in 1992, due to difficulties in making the green color consistent between its logo and jerseys. The logo sits inside an open black circle, and lies on a field of white in the middle of the chest on both uniforms. Before the Devils' move from Colorado in 1982, then-owner John McMullen's wife designed a prototype logo, which was then modified by a professional graphic design and marketing firm, and became the green-and-red logo used by the team for the first ten years in New Jersey.

=== Mascot ===
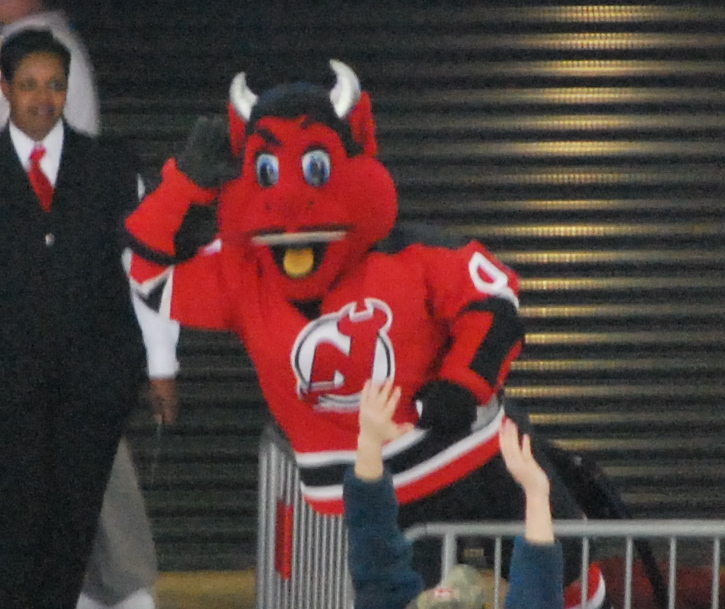
NJ Devil, the team's mascot

The mascot is "NJ Devil", a 7-foot (2.1 m) tall devil who plays into the myth of the Jersey Devil. NJ Devil keeps the crowd excited, signs autographs, participates in entertainment during the intermissions, skates across the ice, throws T-shirts and runs throughout the aisles of the arena to high five fans. Until 1993, the mascot was "Slapshot", a large Devils hockey puck that interacted with the fans. The man inside the costume resigned after he was accused of touching three women inappropriately while in costume. The man agreed to undergo psychological counseling for a year as part of his agreement to avoid trial. To remove the stigma of the lawsuit, Slapshot was retired and has not returned since.

=== Traditions ===
Arlette Roxburgh has been the team's primary national anthem singer at home games since 1996 and is a favorite among Devils fans. Pete Cannarozzi has been the team's organist since 2001. His organ playing has been instrumental in bridging the Devils' tradition from the Meadowlands to Prudential Center. In addition to playing during breaks in play and at the end of a period, he also provides Arlette or another local performer with accompanying music during the national anthem.

Some of Prudential Center's most vociferous fans can be found in Sections 233 and 122, home to groups of Devils fans whom self-identify as the Crazies and the Diablos, respectively. The 233 Crazies were originally created in 1993 as the 228 Crazies at the Meadowlands. They are known for their custom, triple-digit Devils jerseys reflecting their section number with "CRAZIES" on the nameplate, and are the source of many chants and generally enthusiastic behavior. A handful of 233 Crazies typically attend every Devils home game and some road games as well. The Diablos of Section 122 were originally conceived in 2011 by the Devils' management, in a bid to liven up the arena atmosphere after the previous season's poor performance. The team made a special season-ticket offer to and sought input from fans seeking to participate in a European-style supporters' section similar to those in Major League Soccer. While the Diablos have ultimately ceased to be supported directly by the organization and the following ownership group has focused on different methods of improving the fan experience, Section 122 and its general vicinity continues to be a source of more raucous behavior and general hostility towards opposing teams.

Mark Baumann is a longtime season ticket holder familiar to many Devils fans for starting the D-E-V-I-L-S chant, dating to 1995. He commonly wears a white Devils jersey with his name and the number 00.

=== Rivalries ===
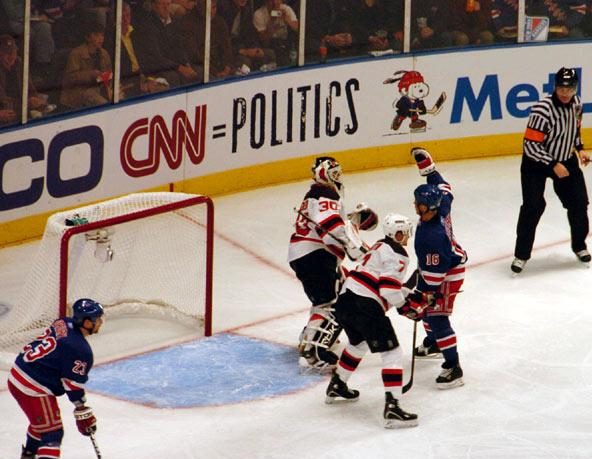
Sean Avery of the New York Rangers attempts to distract Brodeur during the 2008 Stanley Cup playoffs. The playoff series was the fifth to feature the Devils–Rangers rivalry.

The Devils developed strong rivalries with two teams out of geographical proximity and frequent playoff confrontations. The "Battle of the Hudson River" with the New York Rangers is so-called as the Devils' arenas in the New York metropolitan area were always less than ten miles and across the Hudson River from Madison Square Garden. New Jersey's proximity with Pennsylvania also led to a rivalry with the Philadelphia Flyers, the "Battle of the Jersey Turnpike". The Flyers have a large following in South Jersey and train in Voorhees Township. Both teams had the most titles of the Atlantic Division before the 2013 realignment, with nine to the Devils and six to the Flyers.

=== Style of play ===
The Devils have been known as a defense-first team since head coach Jacques Lemaire's first tenure, although the Devils have twice led the Eastern Conference in goals scored, once leading the NHL in goals scored (295 goals for in 2000–01). Lemaire gave the Devils their defensive mantra when he implemented a system commonly called the "neutral zone trap". This system is designed to force teams to turn over the puck in the neutral zone leading to a counterattack. This style of play led the team to be chastised by the media and hockey purists for "making the NHL boring". Nevertheless, the Devils were successful using this style of play, and Devils head coach Larry Robinson asserted that the Montreal Canadiens teams he played on in the 1970s (who also won the Cup many times) used a form of the trap, though it did not have a name.

Under head coach Brent Sutter, the team adopted less of a trap and more of a transitional, aggressive forechecking style of play which also emphasized puck possession and instilled the cycle to start the 2007–08 season. This led to many high scoring games early in the season for New Jersey. The Devils went on to score 244 goals in the 2008–09 season, the most the team had scored in eight seasons. However, with the return of Lemaire as head coach, the Devils resumed a more defense-oriented playing style, scoring just 222 goals and allowing only 191, an NHL best in the 2009–10 season, earning Martin Brodeur his fifth William M. Jennings Trophy.

Lemaire has since re-entered retirement, and was replaced by former Florida head coach Peter DeBoer on July 19, 2011. The team showed greater offensive prowess during the 2011–12 season, employing a more aggressive forecheck centered on Ilya Kovalchuk. Under DeBoer's system, according to Lamoriello, the Devils' defenseman were often sent into the offensive zone to apply pressure on the opposing team's defense. After DeBoer's dismissal, Adam Oates had a similar approach improving the Devils' offense, investing on the versatility of the forwards. Oates left the organization in 2015, and the head coaching position was filled by John Hynes, who shifted the focus to a more "fast, attacking, supportive" style of play in an effort to score more goals. Hynes remained as head coach until he was dismissed in 2020, replaced by long-term assistant Alain Nasreddine, who kept the same general strategy intact with a slight increase to offensive execution. In 2021, Nasreddine was replaced by Lindy Ruff. Under Ruff, the Devils were known to play with an up-tempo style that highlighted the speed of their young talent. Ruff remained as head coach until he was replaced by his assistant Travis Green during the 2023–24 season, who maintained a similar style of play as interim, but with a focus on encouraging the players to adopt a stronger mentality.

== Players and personnel ==
=== Current roster ===
Updated November 13, 2026

| No. | Nat | Player | Pos | S/G | Age | Acquired | Birthplace |
|---|---|---|---|---|---|---|---|
| 34 | (Canada) | Jake Allen | G | L | 36 | 2024 | Fredericton, New Brunswick |
| 70 | (Sweden) | Jesper Boqvist | C | L | 28 | 2026 | Falun, Sweden |
| 63 | (Sweden) | Jesper Bratt (A) | LW | L | 28 | 2017 | Stockholm, Sweden |
| 16 | (Canada) | Connor Brown | RW | R | 32 | 2025 | Etobicoke, Ontario |
| 24 | (United States) | Seamus Casey | D | R | 22 | 2022 | Miami, Florida |
| 47 | (Canada) | Declan Chisholm | D | L | 26 | 2026 | Bowmanville, Ontario |
| 5 | (Canada) | Brenden Dillon | D | L | 36 | 2024 | Surrey, British Columbia |
| 77 | (Canada) | Luke Evangelista | RW | R | 24 | 2026 | Oakville, Ontario |
| 12 | (Canada) | Cody Glass | C | R | 27 | 2025 | Winnipeg, Manitoba |
| 81 | (Russia) | Arseni Gritsyuk | RW | L | 25 | 2019 | Krasnoyarsk, Russia |
| 29 | (Finland) | Lenni Hämeenaho | RW | R | 22 | 2023 | Kajaani, Finland |
| 7 | (Canada) | Dougie Hamilton | D | R | 33 | 2021 | Toronto, Ontario |
| 37 | (United States) | Connor Hellebuyck | G | L | 33 | 2026 | Commerce, Michigan |
| 13 | (Switzerland) | Nico Hischier (C) | C | L | 27 | 2017 | Brig, Switzerland |
| 86 | (United States) | Jack Hughes (A) | C | L | 25 | 2019 | Orlando, Florida |
| 43 | (United States) | Luke Hughes | D | L | 23 | 2021 | Manchester, New Hampshire |
| 8 | (Canada) | Johnathan Kovacevic | D | R | 29 | 2024 | Hamilton, Ontario |
| 18 | (Belarus) | Vladislav Kolyachonok | D | L | 25 | 2026 | Minsk, Belarus |
| 93 | (Canada) | Amadeus Lombardi | C | L | 23 | 2026 | Newmarket, Ontario |
| 39 | (Canada) | Anthony Mantha | RW | L | 32 | 2026 | Longueuil, Quebec |
| 28 | (Switzerland) | Timo Meier | RW | L | 30 | 2023 | Herisau, Switzerland |
| 11 | (United States) | Stefan Noesen | RW | R | 33 | 2024 | Plano, Texas |
| 22 | (United States) | Brett Pesce | D | R | 32 | 2024 | Tarrytown, New York |
| 17 | (Canada) | Evan Rodrigues | C | R | 33 | 2026 | Toronto, Ontario |
| 71 | (Switzerland) | Jonas Siegenthaler | D | L | 29 | 2021 | Zürich, Switzerland |
| 52 | (Russia) | Anton Silayev | D | L | 20 | 2024 | Sarov, Russia |

=== Honored members ===
==== Retired numbers ====
The retired numbers of Patrik Eliáš, Martin Brodeur, Scott Niedermayer, Ken Daneyko and Scott Stevens

The Devils have retired five numbers.

New Jersey Devils retired numbers
| No. | Player | Position | Career | Date of retirement |
|---|---|---|---|---|
| 3 | Ken Daneyko ^{1} | D | 1982–2003 | March 24, 2006 |
| 4 | Scott Stevens ^{2} | D | 1991–2005 | February 3, 2006 |
| 26 | Patrik Eliáš ^{3} | LW | 1994–2016 | February 24, 2018 |
| 27 | Scott Niedermayer ^{4} | D | 1991–2004 | December 16, 2011 |
| 30 | Martin Brodeur ^{5} | G | 1990–2014 | February 9, 2016 |

Notes:

- ^{1} Daneyko holds the record for most games played in the Devils uniform with 1,283 (and spent his entire career with the team).
- ^{2} Stevens spent 13 seasons with the Devils, captaining the team for 12 of those seasons (1992–2004) while serving as captain of all three Stanley Cup-winning teams. Note that the banner includes the 2004–05 lockout season, as Stevens did not retire until 2005.
- ^{3} Eliáš was the first forward to have his number retired in Devils franchise history. Eliáš played his entire career with the Devils and holds the franchise record for goals, assists and points.
- ^{4} Niedermayer spent the first 13 seasons of his career with the Devils, winning the James Norris Memorial Trophy in 2004.
- ^{5} Brodeur holds the NHL goaltenders' record for wins (691), shutouts (125), games played (1266), playoff shutouts (24), and goals scored (3). Brodeur won the Vezina Trophy four times with the Devils.
- The NHL retired Wayne Gretzky's No. 99 for all its member teams at the 2000 NHL All-Star Game.

==== Hall of Fame honorees ====
Twelve Devils players have been inducted into the Hockey Hall of Fame. Peter Šťastný, who played for the Devils from 1989 to 1993, was inducted in 1998. A center who defected from Czechoslovakia, Šťastný was one of the NHL's top goal scorers in the 1980s. In 2001, Šťastný was joined in the Hall of Fame by Devils defenseman Viacheslav Fetisov, who was one of the first Soviet players in the NHL. Fetisov played for the team in the 1989–90 season and again from 1990 to 1995. Scott Stevens, the Devils' defenseman from 1991 to 2004 and long-time team captain, was inducted in 2007 in his first year of eligibility. In December 2014, Stevens returned as head coach for the Devils' defense. Igor Larionov, a forward with a 15-year career in the NHL who spent the 2003–04 season with the Devils, was inducted in 2008. Two Devils centers were inducted in 2011: Doug Gilmour, who had played for the team from 1996 to 1998, and Joe Nieuwendyk, a member of the club from 2001 to 2003. In 2013, the Hall of Fame again inducted two former Devils players: left wing Brendan Shanahan, who had played for the team from 1987 to 1991 and again for the 2008–09 season, and defenseman Scott Niedermayer, who was a Devil from 1992 to 2004. In the 2015, defenseman Phil Housley, who briefly played 22 games for the organization after being traded to New Jersey at the 1996 trade deadline, was inducted into the Hall of Fame. In 2017, left wing Dave Andreychuk, who played for the Devils for four seasons from 1996 to 1999, was inducted into the Hall of Fame. In 2018, longtime Devils goaltender Martin Brodeur was inducted into the Hall of Fame, who played with the team from 1991 to 2014, breaking multiple league records including most wins and shutouts while a member of the team. In 2025, right wing Alexander Mogilny, who played for the Devils for three non-consecutive seasons from 2000 to 2006, was inducted into the Hall of Fame in 2025.

In 2009, Lou Lamoriello, Devils president and general manager from 1987 to 2015, was inducted into the Hall as a Builder. Two Devils head coaches have also been inducted in the category. Herb Brooks, who coached the 1980 U.S. Olympic team to victory in the "Miracle on Ice" and served as Devils head coach in the 1992–93 season, was inducted in 2006. Pat Burns, head coach from 2002 to 2004, was inducted posthumously in 2014. Longtime Devils broadcaster Mike Emrick was the 2008 recipient of the Foster Hewitt Memorial Award.

Three Devils head coaches had been inducted as players before joining the Devils organization. Jacques Lemaire, a 12-season NHL veteran forward who played primarily for the Canadiens, was inducted in 1984 and served as Devils head coach from 1993 to 1998 and from 2009 to 2011. Larry Robinson, who spent most of his 20-season career with the Canadiens, was inducted in 1995 and subsequently served as Devils head coach from 2000 to 2002 and in 2005. Adam Oates, a center with 19 seasons in the NHL who was inducted in 2012, began serving as the Devils head coach for offense in December 2014.

==== Devils Ring of Honor ====
During the 2016–17 season the Devils created a Devils Ring of Honor to honor players whose numbers were not retired and other team personnel. The Ring of Honor Committee consists of the five players whose numbers are retired by the organization (Stevens, Daneyko, Niedermayer, Brodeur and Eliáš), the three Ring of Honor inductees (Peter McMullen, on behalf of the McMullen family, Brylin and Lemaire) and select media/team executives each year.

John McMullen, owner of the Devils from 1982 to 2000, was the inaugural inductee and was inducted on January 6, 2017. Sergei Brylin was inducted on January 20, 2024, becoming the second inductee. Brylin, a defensive forward, played for the Devils from 1995 to 2008, won three Stanley Cup titles with the team and is one of only five Devils who played for all three championship teams. He later became an assistant coach with the Devils. On January 22, 2025, Jacques Lemaire became the third inductee. Lemaire, a Hockey Hall of Famer, was the head coach of the Devils from 1993 to 1998 and again from 2009 to 2011. He coached the Devils to their first Stanley Cup in 1995 and his 11th championship overall. On January 27, 2026, John MacLean became the fourth inductee. MacLean played on right wing for the Devils from 1983 to 1998, winning the Stanley Cup in 1995. He later went on to be part of the coaching staff of the Devils, where he won another Stanley Cup in 2003 as an assistant coach.

=== Team captains ===
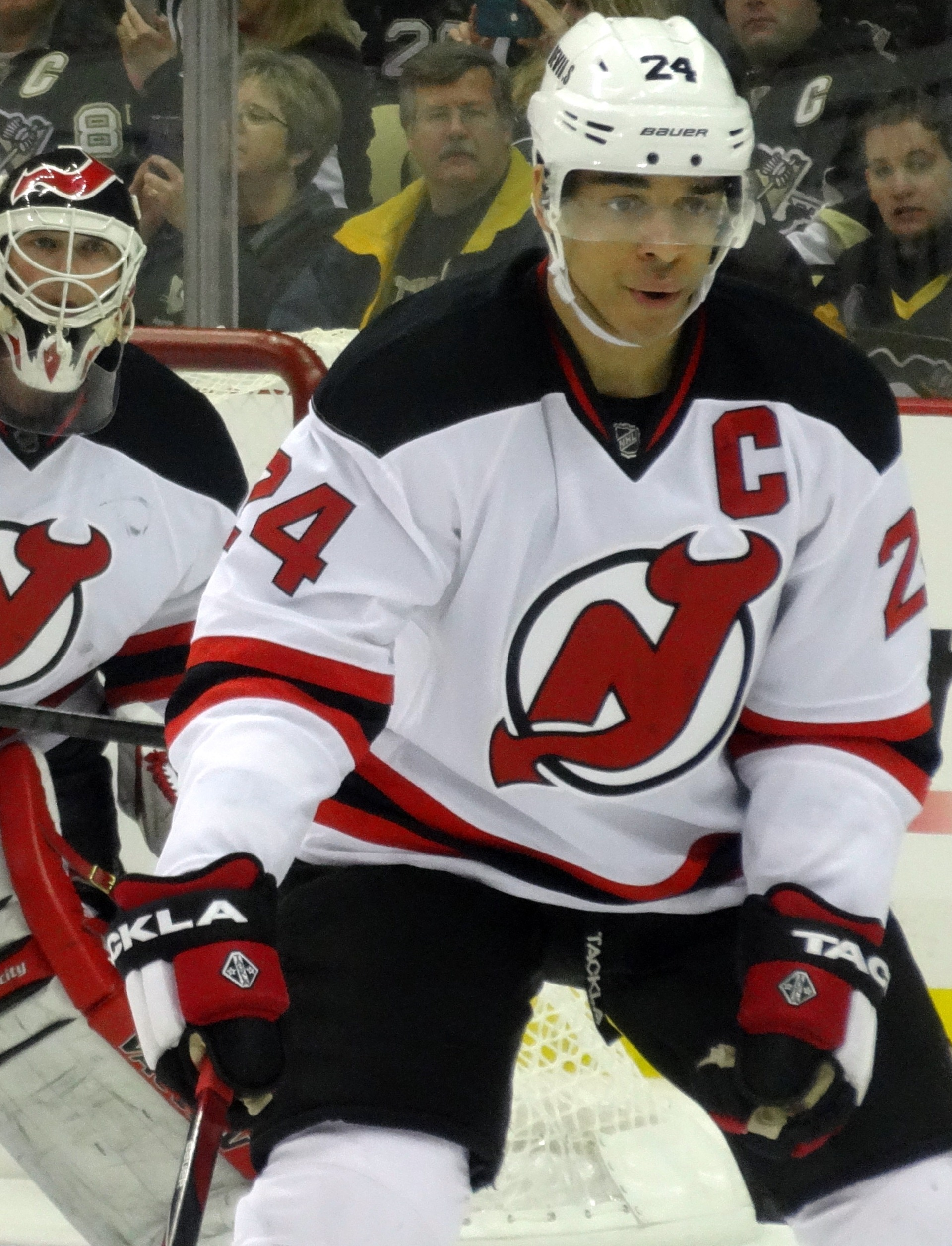
Bryce Salvador was the Devils' captain from 2013 to 2015.

This list does not include the former captains of the Kansas City Scouts and Colorado Rockies.

- Don Lever, 1982–1984
- Mel Bridgman, 1984–1987
- Kirk Muller, 1987–1991
- Bruce Driver, 1991–1992
- Scott Stevens, 1992–2004
- Scott Niedermayer, 2004
- Patrik Eliáš, 2006–2007
- Jamie Langenbrunner, 2007–2011
- Zach Parise, 2011–2012
- Bryce Salvador, 2013–2015
- Andy Greene, 2015–2020
- Nico Hischier, 2021–present

=== General managers ===
This list does not include the former general managers of the Kansas City Scouts and Colorado Rockies.

- Bill MacMillan, 1982–1983
- Max McNab, 1983–1987
- Lou Lamoriello, 1987–2015
- Ray Shero, 2015–2020
- Tom Fitzgerald, 2020–2026
- Sunny Mehta, 2026–present

=== Head coaches ===
This list does not include the former coaches of the Kansas City Scouts and Colorado Rockies.

- Bill MacMillan, 1982–1983
- Tom McVie, 1983–1984
- Doug Carpenter, 1984–1988
- Jim Schoenfeld, 1988–1989
- John Cunniff, 1989–1991
- Tom McVie, 1991–1992
- Herb Brooks, 1992–1993
- Jacques Lemaire, 1993–1998
- Robbie Ftorek, 1998–2000
- Larry Robinson, 2000–2002^{1}
- Kevin Constantine, 2002
- Pat Burns, 2002–2005
- Larry Robinson, 2005
- Lou Lamoriello, 2005–2006
- Claude Julien, 2006–2007
- Lou Lamoriello, 2007^{2}
- Brent Sutter, 2007–2009
- Jacques Lemaire, 2009–2010
- John MacLean, 2010
- Jacques Lemaire, 2010–2011^{3}
- Peter DeBoer, 2011–2014
- Adam Oates and
  Scott Stevens (co-head coaches), 2014–2015^{4}
- John Hynes, 2015–2019
- Alain Nasreddine, 2019–2020^{5}
- Lindy Ruff, 2020–2024
- Travis Green, 2024^{6}
- Sheldon Keefe, 2024–present

Notes:

- ^{1} Robinson took over as interim head coach with eight games left in the 1999–2000 season after Ftorek was fired. After winning the Stanley Cup in 2000, he was hired as the permanent head coach.
- ^{2} Lamoriello took over as interim head coach after the firing Julien with only three games left in the 2006–07 season.
- ^{3} Lemaire took over as interim head coach in the middle of the 2010–11 season after MacLean was fired.
- ^{4} Stevens and Oates took over as interim co-head coaches in the middle of the 2013–14 season after DeBoer was fired.
- ^{5} Nasreddine took over as interim head coach in the middle of the 2019–20 season after Hynes was fired.
- ^{6} Green took over as interim head coach in the middle of the 2023–24 season after Ruff was fired.

=== First-round draft picks ===
This list does not include draft picks of the Kansas City Scouts and Colorado Rockies.

- 1982: Rocky Trottier (8th overall), Ken Daneyko (18th overall)
- 1983: John MacLean (6th overall)
- 1984: Kirk Muller (2nd overall)
- 1985: Craig Wolanin (3rd overall)
- 1986: Neil Brady (3rd overall)
- 1987: Brendan Shanahan (2nd overall)
- 1988: Corey Foster (12th overall)
- 1989: Bill Guerin (5th overall), Jason Miller (18th overall)
- 1990: Martin Brodeur (20th overall)
- 1991: Scott Niedermayer (3rd overall), Brian Rolston (11th overall)
- 1992: Jason Smith (18th overall)
- 1993: Denis Pederson (13th overall)
- 1994: Vadim Sharifijanov (25th overall)
- 1995: Petr Sýkora (18th overall)
- 1996: Lance Ward (10th overall)
- 1997: Jean-François Damphousse (24th overall)
- 1998: Mike Van Ryn (26th overall), Scott Gomez (27th overall)
- 1999: Ari Ahonen (27th overall)
- 2000: David Hale (22nd overall)
- 2001: Adrian Foster (28th overall)
- 2003: Zach Parise (17th overall)
- 2004: Travis Zajac (20th overall)
- 2005: Niclas Bergfors (23rd overall)
- 2006: Matt Corrente (30th overall)
- 2008: Mattias Tedenby (24th overall)
- 2009: Jacob Josefson (20th overall)
- 2011: Adam Larsson (4th overall)
- 2012: Stefan Matteau (29th overall)
- 2014: John Quenneville (30th overall)
- 2015: Pavel Zacha (6th overall)
- 2016: Michael McLeod (12th overall)
- 2017: Nico Hischier (1st overall)
- 2018: Ty Smith (17th overall)
- 2019: Jack Hughes (1st overall)
- 2020: Alexander Holtz (7th overall), Dawson Mercer (18th overall), Shakir Mukhamadullin (20th overall)
- 2021: Luke Hughes (4th overall), Chase Stillman (29th overall)
- 2022: Šimon Nemec (2nd overall)
- 2024: Anton Silayev (10th overall)
- 2026: Alexander Command (12th overall)

== Franchise records ==
=== Scoring leaders ===
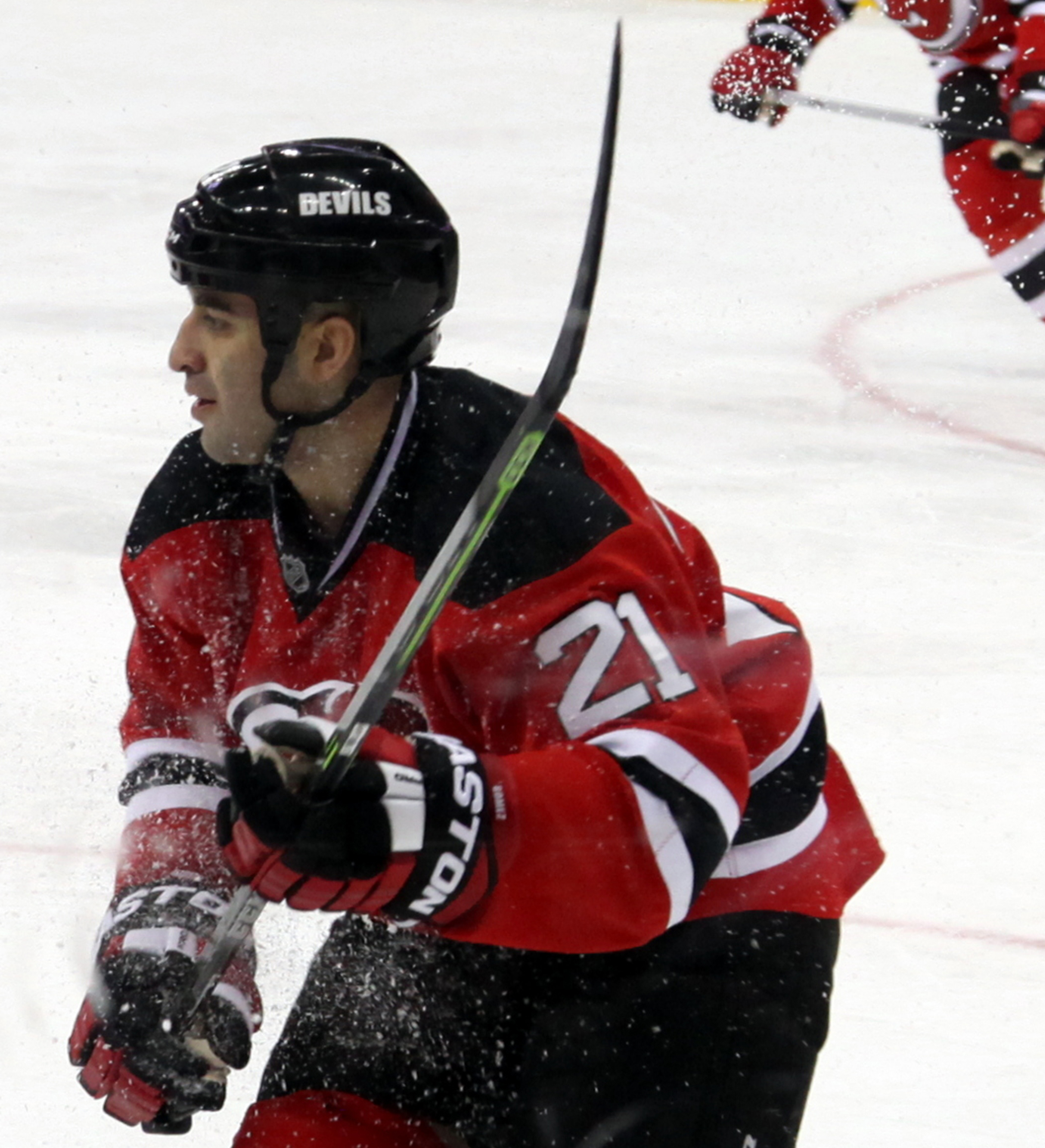
Recording 484 points with the Devils, Scott Gomez is the seventh-highest all-time points leader in franchise history.

These are the top-ten point-scorers in franchise (Kansas City, Colorado and New Jersey) history. Figures are updated after each completed NHL regular season.

- * – current Devils player

Note: Pos = Position; GP = Games played; G = Goals; A = Assists; Pts = Points; P/G = Points per game

Points
| Player | Pos | GP | G | A | Pts | P/G |
|---|---|---|---|---|---|---|
| Patrik Eliáš | LW | 1,240 | 408 | 617 | 1,025 | .83 |
| John MacLean | RW | 934 | 347 | 354 | 701 | .75 |
| Travis Zajac | C | 1,024 | 202 | 348 | 550 | .54 |
| Kirk Muller | LW | 556 | 185 | 335 | 520 | .94 |
| Jesper Bratt* | LW | 634 | 172 | 346 | 518 | .82 |
| Nico Hischier* | C | 609 | 199 | 289 | 488 | .80 |
| Scott Gomez | C | 606 | 123 | 361 | 484 | .80 |
| Scott Niedermayer | D | 892 | 112 | 364 | 476 | .53 |
| Bobby Holík | C | 786 | 202 | 270 | 472 | .60 |
| Aaron Broten | C | 641 | 162 | 307 | 469 | .73 |

Goals
| Player | Pos | G |
|---|---|---|
| Patrik Eliáš | LW | 408 |
| John MacLean | RW | 347 |
| Bobby Holík | LW | 202 |
| Travis Zajac | C | 202 |
| Nico Hischier* | C | 199 |
| Zach Parise | RW | 194 |
| Kirk Muller | LW | 185 |
| Jesper Bratt* | LW | 172 |
| Pat Verbeek | RW | 170 |
| Jack Hughes* | C | 168 |

Assists
| Player | Pos | A |
|---|---|---|
| Patrik Eliáš | LW | 617 |
| Scott Niedermayer | D | 364 |
| Scott Gomez | C | 361 |
| John MacLean | RW | 354 |
| Travis Zajac | C | 348 |
| Jesper Bratt* | LW | 346 |
| Scott Stevens | D | 337 |
| Kirk Muller | LW | 335 |
| Bruce Driver | D | 316 |
| Aaron Broten | C | 307 |

=== Goaltending leaders ===
These goaltenders rank in the top ten in franchise (Kansas City, Colorado and New Jersey) history for wins. Figures are updated after each completed NHL season.

- * – current Devils player

Note: GP = Games played; W = Wins; L = Losses; T/O = Ties/Overtime losses; GA = Goal against; GAA = Goals against average; SA = Shots against; SV% = Save percentage; SO = Shutouts

Goaltenders
| Player | GP | W | L | T/O | GA | GAA | SA | SV% | SO |
|---|---|---|---|---|---|---|---|---|---|
| Martin Brodeur | 1,259 | 688 | 394 | 154 | 2,764 | 2.24 | 31,540 | .912 | 124 |
| Chris Terreri | 302 | 118 | 118 | 34 | 847 | 3.07 | 7,827 | .892 | 7 |
| Cory Schneider | 311 | 115 | 133 | 50 | 745 | 2.50 | 8,768 | .915 | 17 |
| Chico Resch | 267 | 67 | 148 | 33 | 1,010 | 4.10 | 7,771 | .870 | 1 |
| Mackenzie Blackwood | 152 | 65 | 57 | 18 | 424 | 2.97 | 4,496 | .906 | 8 |
| Keith Kinkaid | 151 | 64 | 55 | 17 | 399 | 2.90 | 4,267 | .906 | 7 |
| Sean Burke | 162 | 62 | 66 | 23 | 552 | 3.66 | 4,444 | .876 | 4 |
| Alain Chevrier | 140 | 53 | 63 | 7 | 518 | 4.22 | 3,854 | .866 | 1 |
| Vítek Vaněček | 84 | 50 | 20 | 7 | 214 | 2.73 | 2,195 | .903 | 3 |
| Jacob Markström | 93 | 49 | 35 | 7 | 251 | 2.76 | 2,327 | .892 | 5 |

=== Individual and team records ===
Career records

- Most games played – Ken Daneyko, 1,283
- Most goals – Patrik Eliáš, 408
- Most assists – Patrik Eliáš, 617
- Most points – Patrik Eliáš, 1,025
- Most penalty minutes – Ken Daneyko, 2,516
- Most wins – Martin Brodeur, 688

Regular season records

- Most goals in a season – Brian Gionta, 48 (2005–06)
- Most assists in a season – Jesper Bratt, 67 (2024–25)
- Most points in a season – Jack Hughes, 99 (2022–23)
- Most penalty minutes in a season – Krzysztof Oliwa, 295 (1997–98)
- Most wins in a season – Martin Brodeur, 48 (2006–07)
- Most power play goals in a season – Brian Gionta, 24 (2005–06)

Playoff records

- Most goals in a playoff season – Claude Lemieux, 13 (1995)
- Most goals by a defenseman in a playoff season – Brian Rafalski, 7 (2001)
- Most assists in a playoff season – Scott Niedermayer, 16 (2003)
- Most points in a single playoff game – Patrik Sundström, 8 (April 22, 1988; also the NHL record)
- Most points in a playoff season – Patrik Eliáš, 23 (2001)
- Most points by a defenseman in a playoff season – Brian Rafalski and Scott Niedermayer, 18 (2001, 2003)
- Most penalty minutes in a playoff season – Perry Anderson, 113 (1988)

Team records

- Most consecutive wins in a season – 13 (2000–01) (2022–23)
- Most points in a season – 112 (2022–23)
- Most wins in a season – 52 (2022–23)
- Longest season-ending win streak – 11 (2005–06)

== Affiliate teams ==
=== American Hockey League ===
The Maine Mariners were the Devils' first American Hockey League (AHL) affiliate, from 1982 to 1987. The team moved in 1987 and became the Utica Devils, serving as New Jersey's affiliate until 1993. The Albany River Rats became their affiliate from 1993 to 2006. In 2006, the Devils bought the Lowell Lock Monsters and renamed them the Lowell Devils, which moved in 2010 to become the Albany Devils. The Albany Devils moved after the 2016–17 season and became the Binghamton Devils. In May 2021, it was announced that the Binghamton Devils would be moved to Utica in the 2021–22 season to become the Utica Comets.

=== ECHL ===
In 2006, the Devils purchased the ECHL franchise Trenton Titans, which was then renamed the Trenton Devils. After four seasons of on-ice struggles and financial losses, the Devils suspended operations of the Trenton franchise in 2011. On August 8, 2017, the Devils announced a one-year affiliation with the Adirondack Thunder for the 2017–18 season, after having an "informal working arrangement" for the past two seasons.

== Television and radio ==
Television: MSGSN

- Don La Greca – play-by-play
- Ken Daneyko – color commentator
- Bryce Salvador – color commentator and studio analyst
- Rachel Herzog – TV host

Radio: Audacy (formerly Radio.com), WFAN (selected games)

- Matt Loughlin – play-by-play
- Chico Resch – color commentator

== Notes ==
| Preceded by New York Rangers | Stanley Cup champions 1994–95 | Succeeded by Colorado Avalanche |
| Preceded by Dallas Stars | Stanley Cup champions 1999–2000 | Succeeded by Colorado Avalanche |
| Preceded by Detroit Red Wings | Stanley Cup champions 2002–03 | Succeeded by Tampa Bay Lightning |
