= Leeds Point, New Jersey =

Populated place in Atlantic County, New Jersey, US

- Census-designated place
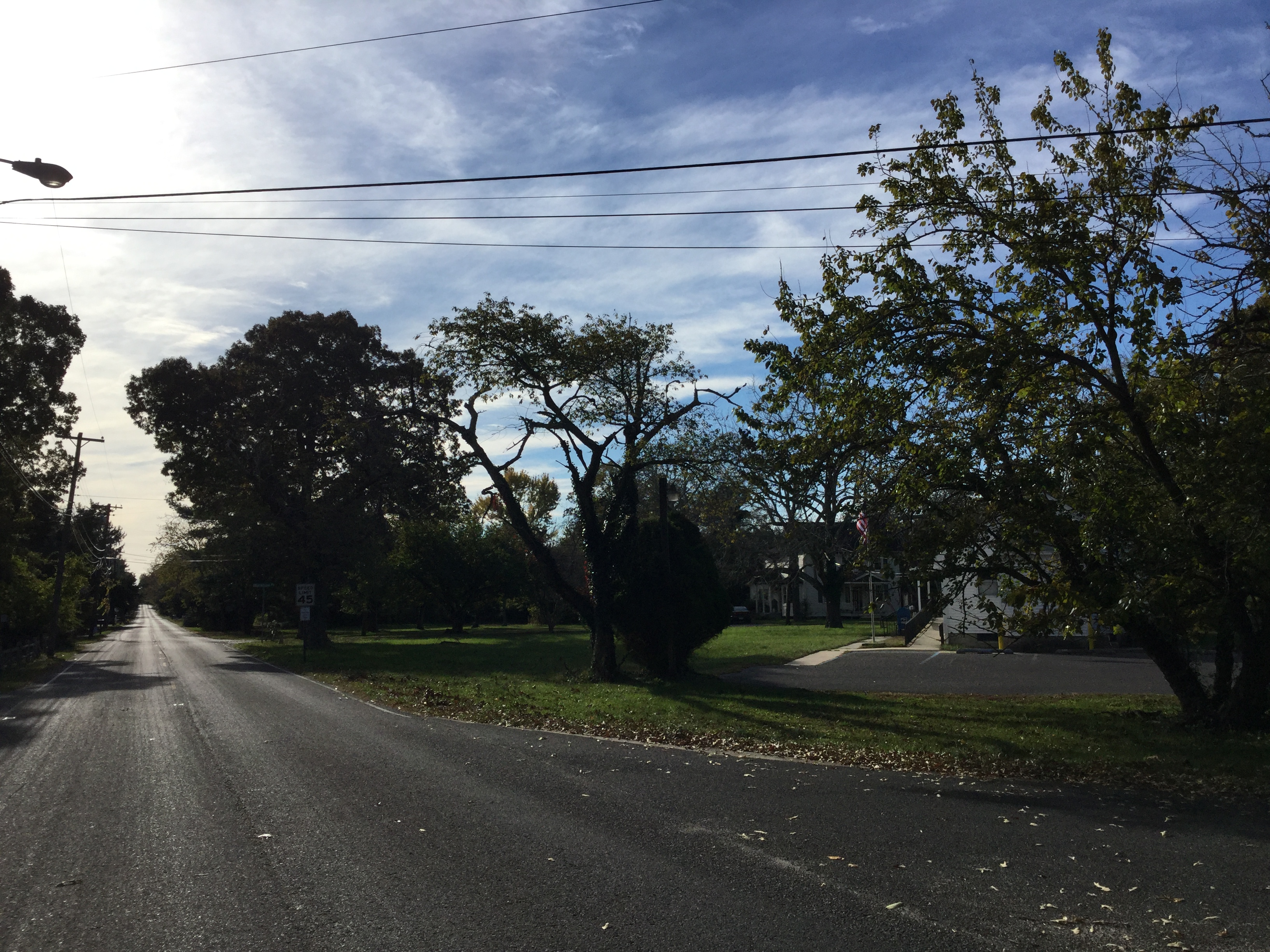

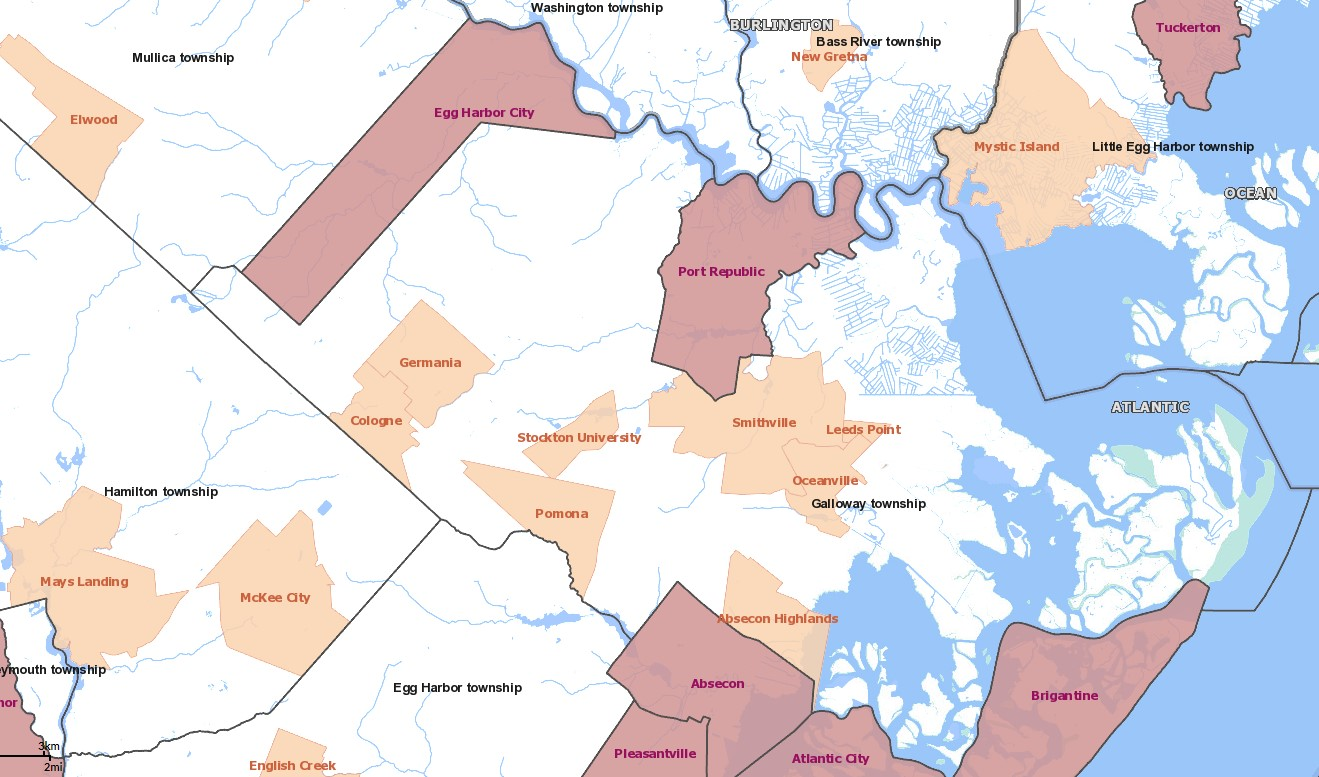
- Neighboring communities

- Location in Atlantic County Location in New Jersey Location in the United States
- Coordinates: 39°29′31″N 74°25′45″W
- Country: United States
- State: New Jersey
- County: Atlantic
- Township: Galloway

Area
  - Total: 0.24 sq mi (0.63 km^{2})
  - Land: 0.24 sq mi (0.63 km^{2})
  - Water: 0 sq mi (0.00 km^{2})
- Elevation: 49 ft (15 m)

Population (2020)
  - Total: 205
  - Density: 846.5/sq mi (326.83/km^{2})
- Time zone: UTC−05:00 (Eastern (EST))
  - Summer (DST): UTC−04:00 (Eastern (EDT))
- ZIP Code: 08220
- Area codes: 609/640
- FIPS code: 34-39810
- GNIS feature ID: 877726

Leeds Point (also known as Leeds) is an unincorporated community and census-designated place (CDP) located within Galloway Township, Atlantic County, in the U.S. state of New Jersey. As of the 2020 census, Leeds Point had a population of 205. It is situated on the end of a promontory raised about 30–50 ft above the salt marsh on the south side of Great Bay. Leeds Point is 5.7 miles (9.2 km) northeast of Absecon. Leeds Point has a post office with ZIP Code 08220, which opened on December 18, 1827. The town is named after the Leeds family, whose first American member, Daniel Leeds, Surveyor General of West Jersey around the beginning of the 18th century, after immigrating to New Jersey from the city of Leeds in England, claimed the land which now makes up Leeds Point; some of his descendants lived in Leeds Point from then on. (His descendants also include his son Daniel Leeds and grandson Titan Leeds, who in Philadelphia published one of America's first almanacs.)

The Jersey Devil was born in Leeds Point, according to one legend about the cryptid. The legend claims that in 1735, the thirteenth child of a woman called Mrs. Leeds from the community was transformed into a demon shortly after birth due to her cursing that it would be the devil.

== Demographics ==
Historical population
Census	Pop.	Note	%±
2020	205		—
U.S. Decennial Census

Leeds Point was first listed as a census designated place in the 2020 U.S. census.

Leeds Point CDP, New Jersey – Racial and ethnic composition Note: the US Census treats Hispanic/Latino as an ethnic category. This table excludes Latinos from the racial categories and assigns them to a separate category. Hispanics/Latinos may be of any race.
Race / Ethnicity (NH = Non-Hispanic)	Pop 2020	2020
White alone (NH)	157	76.59%
Black or African American alone (NH)	4	1.95%
Native American or Alaska Native alone (NH)	0	0.00%
Asian alone (NH)	4	1.95%
Native Hawaiian or Pacific Islander alone (NH)	0	0.00%
Other race alone (NH)	3	1.46%
Mixed race or Multiracial (NH)	22	10.73%
Hispanic or Latino (any race)	15	7.32%
Total	205	100.00%

As of 2020, the population was 205.

== Education ==
The CDP is within two school districts: Galloway Township School District (elementary) and Greater Egg Harbor Regional High School District. The zoned high school for Galloway Township is Absegami High School, which is a part of the Greater Egg Harbor district.
