= Jersey Devil =

Legendary creature in North American folklore

- The Jersey Devil, an illustration in The Evening Bulletin Philadelphia on January 21, 1909

Creature information
- Other name: Leeds Devil

Origin
- Country: United States
- Region: Pine Barrens, New Jersey

In South Jersey and Philadelphia folklore in the United States, the Jersey Devil, also known as the Leeds Devil, is a legendary creature, or cryptid, said to inhabit the forests of the New Jersey Pine Barrens in South Jersey. The creature is often described as a flying biped with hooves, but there are many variations. The common description is that of a bipedal kangaroo-like or wyvern-like creature with a horse- or goat-like head, leathery bat-like wings, horns, small arms with clawed hands, legs with cloven hooves, and a forked or barbed tail. It is also said to possess a strange elongated body as well as a thick tail. It has been reported to move quickly and is often described as emitting a high-pitched "blood-curdling scream".

== Origin of the legend ==
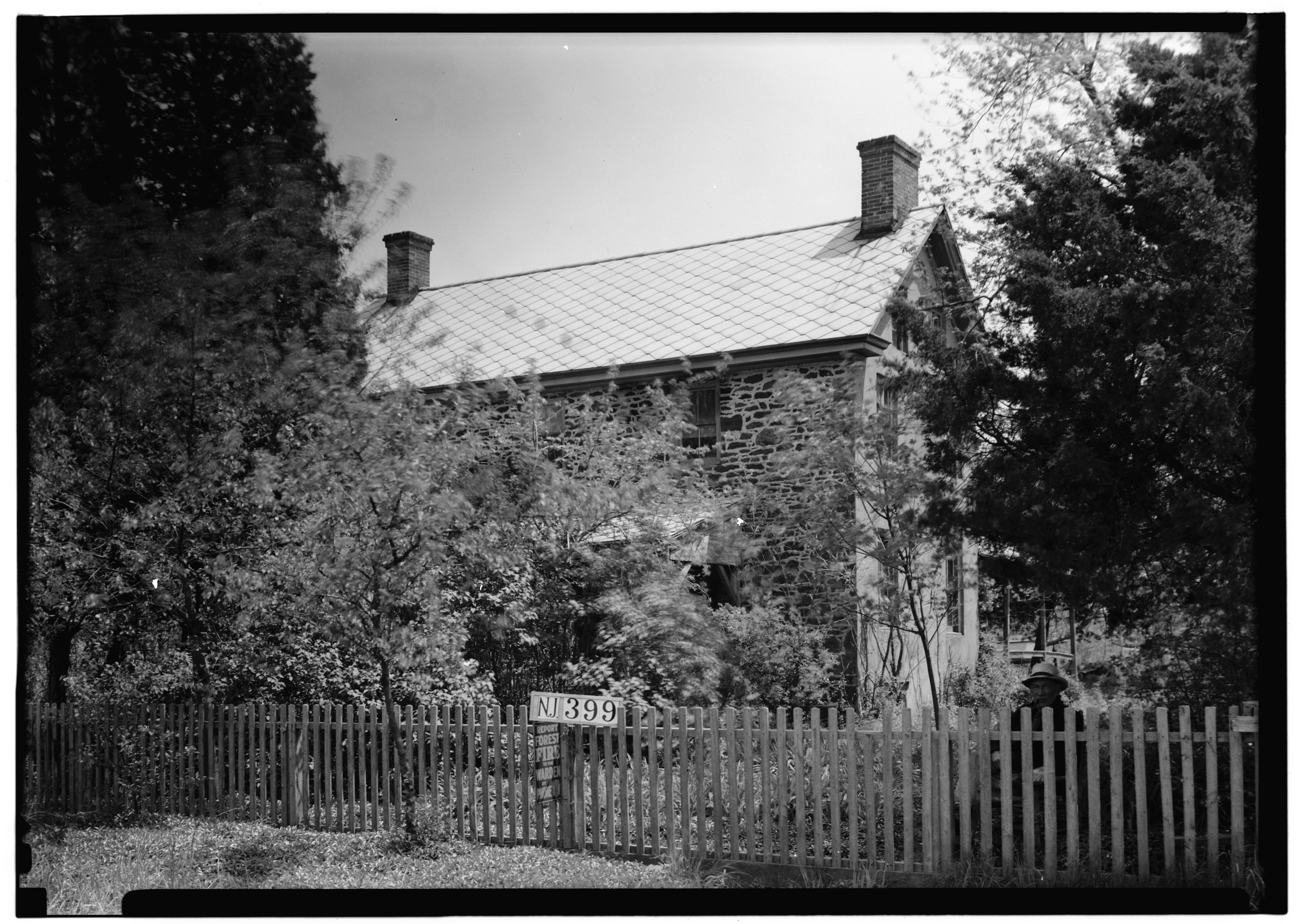
Japhet Leeds House on Moss Mill Road in Leeds Point, New Jersey, c. 1937

=== Mother Leeds's 13th child ===
The popular legend of the Jersey Devil or Leeds Devil is dated variously, and is almost without exception attached to "The Pines", or the South Jersey Pine Barrens, and sometimes specifically to the community of Leeds Point therein. The devil's mother is usually identified in the folklore as a woman named Leeds, or "Mother Leeds" of Burlington, but other names such as the Shourds have occasionally been forwarded.

According to one précis, in 1735 a woman named Leeds, who had given birth to twelve children, discovered she was pregnant for the thirteenth time and cursed the child in frustration, declaring, "Let the child be the devil!". The child, though born normally, immediately grew wings, a tail, and claws following birth and flew out to the Pine Barrens, hunting happy families out of resentment for never having had one.

In some versions of the story, the child transformed into a creature with hooves, a goat's head, bat wings, and a forked tail. Growling and screaming, the child thrashed everyone with its tail before ascending the chimney and departing into the pines. Some variants describe Mother Leeds as a supposed witch and the child's father as the devil himself. In some tellings, local clergymen subsequently attempted to exorcise the creature from the Pine Barrens.

One distinct variation on the tale is localized not at Leeds Point but at Esteville, (Note: This was the locale favored by Alfred M. Heston (1928).) near Mays Landing, wherein a Mrs. Leeds became pregnant around 1855 and rejected her baby, wishing a stork would deliver a devil. Thus a winged devil was born and flew out the window; it would intermittently return but the mother would shoo it away.

=== The Leeds family ===
Before the early 1900s, the Jersey Devil was referred to as the Leeds Devil or the Devil of Leeds, either in connection with the local Leeds family or the eponymous Leeds Point in South Jersey.

"Mother Leeds" has been identified by some as the real-life Deborah Leeds, on the grounds that Deborah Leeds's husband, Japhet Leeds, named twelve children in the will he wrote during 1736, which is compatible with the legend. Deborah and Japhet Leeds also lived in the Leeds Point section of what is now Atlantic County, New Jersey, which is commonly the location of the Jersey Devil story.

Brian Regal, a historian of science at Kean University, theorizes that the story of Mother Leeds, rather than being based on a single historical person alone, originated from the reputation of the local prominent Leeds family in the southern portion of the colonial-era Province of New Jersey, where religiopolitical disputes became the subject of folklore and gossip among the local population. Regal contends that folk legends concerning these historical disputes evolved through the years and ultimately resulted in the modern popular legend of the Jersey Devil during the early 20th century. Regal contends that "colonial-era political intrigue" involving early New Jersey politicians, Benjamin Franklin, and Franklin's rival almanac publisher Titan Leeds (1699-1738) resulted in the Leeds family being described as "monsters". Rather than any creature, it was allegedly the negative description of Titan Leeds and/or his grandfather Daniel, late Surveyor General of West Jersey, as the "Leeds Devil" that created the Jersey Devil legend.

Much like the Mother Leeds of the Jersey Devil folktale, Daniel Leeds's third wife had given birth to nine children, a sizable number even for the time. Leeds's second wife and first daughter had both died during childbirth. Leeds and his family were prominent in the South Jersey and Pine Barrens area. As a royal surveyor with strong allegiance to the British crown, Leeds had surveyed and acquired land in the Egg Harbor area, located within the Pine Barrens. Leeds's sons and family inherited the land, and it is now known as Leeds Point, one of the areas in the Pine Barrens currently most associated with the Jersey Devil legend and alleged Jersey Devil sightings.

Starting in the 17th century, English Quakers established settlements in Southern Jersey, the region in which the Pine Barrens are located. Daniel Leeds, a Quaker and a prominent figure in pre-Revolutionary colonial southern New Jersey, was ostracized by his Quaker congregation after publishing almanacs in 1687 containing astrological symbols and writings. Leeds's fellow Quakers deemed the astrology in these almanacs as too "pagan" or blasphemous, and the almanacs were censored and destroyed by the local Quaker community.

In response to and despite this censorship, Leeds continued to publish even more esoteric astrological Christian writings and became increasingly fascinated with Christian occultism, Christian mysticism, cosmology, angelology, demonology, and natural magic. In the 1690s, after his almanacs and writings were further censored as blasphemous or heretical by the Philadelphia Quaker Meeting, Leeds continued to dispute with the Quaker community, converting to Anglicanism and publishing anti-Quaker tracts criticizing Quaker theology and accusing Quakers of being anti-monarchists. In the ensuing dispute between Leeds and the southern New Jersey Quakers over Leeds's accusations, Leeds was endorsed by the much-maligned British royal governor of New Jersey, Lord Cornbury, who was despised by the Quaker communities. Leeds also served as a counselor to Lord Cornbury at this time. Considering Leeds as a traitor for aiding the Crown and rejecting Quaker beliefs, the Quaker Burlington Meeting of southern New Jersey subsequently dismissed Leeds as "evil". In 1700, the local South Jersey Quaker community retaliated against Leeds's anti-Quaker tracts with their own tract, Satan’s Harbinger Encountered … Being Something by Way of Answer to Daniel Leeds, which publicly accused Leeds of working for the devil.

In 1716, Daniel Leeds's son, Titan Leeds, inherited his father's almanac business, which continued to use astrological content and eventually competed with Benjamin Franklin's popular Poor Richard's Almanack. The competition between the two men intensified when, in 1733, Franklin satirically used astrology in his almanac to predict Titan Leeds's death in October of that same year. Though Franklin's prediction was intended as a joke at his competitor's expense and a means to boost almanac sales, Titan Leeds was apparently offended at the death prediction, publishing a public admonition of Franklin as a "fool" and a "liar". In a published response, Franklin mocked Titan Leeds's outrage and humorously suggested that, in fact, Titan Leeds had died in accordance with the earlier prediction and was thus writing his almanacs as a ghost, resurrected from the grave to haunt and torment Franklin. Franklin continued to jokingly refer to Titan Leeds as a "ghost" even after Titan Leeds's actual death in 1738. Daniel Leeds's blasphemous and occultist reputation and his pro-monarchy stance in the largely anti-monarchist colonial south of New Jersey, combined with Benjamin Franklin's later continuous depiction of his son Titan Leeds as a ghost, may have originated or contributed to the local folk legend of a so-called "Leeds Devil" lurking in the Pine Barrens.

In 1728, Titan Leeds began to include the Leeds family crest on the masthead of his almanacs. The Leeds family crest depicted a wyvern, a bat-winged dragon-like legendary creature that stands upright on two clawed feet. Regal notes that the wyvern on the Leeds family crest is reminiscent of the popular descriptions of the Jersey Devil. The inclusion of this family crest on Leeds's almanacs may have further contributed to the Leeds family's poor reputation among locals and possibly influenced the popular descriptions of the Leeds Devil or Jersey Devil.

=== The Leeds Devil ===
Regal notes that, by the late 18th century and the early 19th century at the latest, the "Leeds Devil" had become a ubiquitous legendary monster or ghost story in present-day South Jersey. In the early- to mid-19th century, stories continued to circulate in southern New Jersey of the Leeds Devil, a "monster wandering the Pine Barrens". An oral tradition of "Leeds Devil" monster/ghost stories became well established in the Pine Barrens area.

Although the "Leeds Devil" legend has existed since the 18th century, Regal states that the more modern depiction of the Jersey Devil as well as the now pervasive "Jersey Devil" name first became truly standardized in their current form during the early 20th century:

During the pre-Revolutionary period, the Leeds family, who called the Pine Barrens home, soured its relationship with the Quaker majority ... The Quakers saw no hurry to give their former fellow religionist an easy time in circles of gossip. His wives had all died, as had several children. His son Titan stood accused by Benjamin Franklin of being a ghost ... The family crest had winged dragons on it. In a time when thoughts of independence were being born, these issues made the Leeds family political and religious monsters. From all this over time the legend of the Leeds Devil was born. References to the 'Jersey Devil' do not appear in newspapers or other printed material until the twentieth century. The first major flap came in 1909. It is from these sightings that the popular image of the creature—batlike wings, horse head, claws, and general air of a dragon—became standardized.

Indeed, many references to a "Leeds Devil" or "Devil of Leeds" appear in earlier printed material prior to the widespread usage of the "Jersey Devil" name. During 1859, the Atlantic Monthly published an article detailing the Leeds Devil folktales popular among Pine Barren residents. A newspaper from 1887 describes sightings of a winged creature, referred to as "the Devil of Leeds", allegedly spotted near the Pine Barrens and well known among the local populace of Burlington County, New Jersey:

Whenever he went near it, it would give a most unearthly yell that frightened the dogs. It whipped at every dog on the place. "That thing," said the colonel, "is not a bird nor an animal, but it is the Leeds devil, according to the description, and it was born over in Evesham, Burlington County, a hundred years ago. There is no mistake about it. I never saw the horrible critter myself, but I can remember well when it was roaming around in Evesham woods fifty years ago, and when it was hunted by men and dogs and shot at by the best marksmen there were in all South Jersey but could not be killed. There isn't a family in Burlington or any of the adjoining counties that does not know of the Leeds devil, and it was the bugaboo to frighten children with when I was a boy."

== Reported sightings ==
Numerous claimed sightings and occurrences involving an alleged creature bestowed the Jersey Devil name go back at least to the early 19th century.

According to legend, while visiting the Hanover Mill Works to inspect the forging of cannonballs, Commodore Stephen Decatur sighted a flying creature and fired a cannon directly upon it, to no effect.

Joseph Bonaparte, elder brother of Napoleon, is also said to have seen the Jersey Devil while hunting on his Bordentown estate around 1820.

During 1840, the Jersey Devil was blamed for several livestock killings. Similar attacks were reported during 1841, accompanied by tracks and screams.

In Greenwich Township, in December 1925, a local farmer shot an unidentified animal as it attempted to steal his chickens, and then photographed the corpse. Afterward, he claimed that none of the 100 people to whom he showed the photographic print could identify the creature. On July 27, 1937, an unknown animal "with red eyes" was seen by residents in Downingtown, Pennsylvania, and it was compared to the Jersey Devil by a reporter in the Pennsylvania Bulletin the following day. In 1951, a group of boys claimed to have seen a 'monster' matching the creature's description in Gibbstown, New Jersey, and claims of a corpse matching the Jersey Devil's description arose in 1957. During 1960, tracks and noises heard near Mays Landing were claimed to be from the Jersey Devil. During the same year, the merchants around Camden offered a $10,000 reward for the capture of the Jersey Devil, even offering to build a private zoo to house the creature if found.

=== Wave of sightings in 1909 ===
During the week of January 16–23, 1909, newspapers published hundreds of claimed encounters with the Jersey Devil from across South Jersey as well as the Philadelphia area. Among these alleged accounts were claims that the creature "attacked" a trolley car in Haddon Heights and a social club in Camden. Police in Camden and Bristol, Pennsylvania, supposedly fired on the creature to no effect. Other reports initially concerned unidentified footprints in the snow, but soon sightings of creatures resembling the Jersey Devil were being reported throughout South Jersey and as far away as Delaware and western Maryland. The widespread newspaper coverage elicited fear throughout the Philadelphia area, prompting a number of schools to close and workers to stay home. Vigilante groups and groups of hunters roamed the pines and countrysides in search of the alleged animal. During this period, it is rumored that the Philadelphia Zoo posted a $10,000 reward for the creature. The offer prompted a variety of hoaxes, including a kangaroo equipped with artificial claws and bat wings.

== Description and explanation ==
Skeptics disregard the Jersey Devil as nothing more than a creative manifestation upon the imaginations of the early English settlers in South Jersey, with plausible natural explanations including: bogeyman stories created and told by bored Pine Barren residents as a form of children's entertainment; the byproduct of the historical local disdain for the Leeds family; the misidentification of known animals; and rumors based on common negative perceptions of the local rural population of the Pine Barren (who were called by the derogatory epithet "pineys").

The frightening reputation of the Pine Barrens ecosystem may indeed have contributed to the Jersey Devil legend. Historically, the Pine Barrens had been considered inhospitable land. Gangs of highwaymen, such as the politically disdained Loyalist brigands, known as the Pine Robbers, were known to rob and attack travelers passing through the Barrens. During the 18th and 19th centuries, residents of the isolated Pine Barrens were looked down upon or considered the outcasts of society: poor farmers, fugitives, brigands, Native Americans, poachers, moonshiners, runaway slaves, and deserting soldiers. The residents sometimes fostered certain frightening stories about themselves and the Pine Barrens to discourage outsiders or intruders from entering the Barrens. They were further demonized and vilified after two eugenics studies were published during the early 20th century, which depicted them as congenital idiots and criminals, as seen in the research performed on "The Kallikak Family" by Henry H. Goddard, which is now considered biased, inaccurate, unscientific, and, most likely, falsified.

Due in part to their isolated and undeveloped nature, the Pine Barrens have themselves fostered various folk stories. Apart from the Jersey Devil, many other legends are associated with the Pine Barrens. Supernatural creatures and ghosts said to haunt the pine forests include the ghost of the pirate Captain Kidd, who supposedly buried treasure in the Pine Barrens and is sometimes allegedly seen in the company of the Jersey Devil; the ghost of the Black Doctor, the benevolent spirit of an African-American doctor who, after being forbidden from practicing medicine due to his race, entered the Pine Barrens to practice medicine in the isolated communities of the Barrens and is said to still come to the aid of lost or injured travelers; the ghost of the Black Dog which, unlike many black dog legends, is usually portrayed as harmless; the ghost of the Golden-Haired Girl, the spirit of a girl who is said to be staring out into the sea, dressed in white, mourning the loss of her lover at sea; and the White Stag, a ghostly white deer said to rescue travelers in the Barrens from danger. There are also folk tales concerning the Blue Hole, an unusually clear blue and rounded body of water located in the Pine Barrens between Monroe Township, Gloucester County, and Winslow Township, Camden County, which is often associated with the Jersey Devil.

Jeff Brunner of the Humane Society of New Jersey thinks that "vagrant" sandhill cranes are partially the basis of the Jersey Devil stories, adding, "There are no photographs, no bones, no hard evidence whatsoever, and worst of all, no explanation of its origins that doesn't require belief in the supernatural." Sandhill cranes are not indigenous or well known to South Jersey, are approximately the same size as the alleged Jersey Devil, and produce distinctive, loud vocalizations; as unfamiliar animals with a unique trumpeting call, wayward or vagrant migrating Sandhill cranes that ended up in South Jersey could thus potentially startle or frighten Pine Barren residents at night or under other circumstances in which the animal’s true appearance was unclear.

Outdoorsman and author Tom Brown Jr. spent several seasons living in the wilderness of the Pine Barrens. He recounts occasions when terrified hikers mistook him for the Jersey Devil, after he covered his whole body with mud to repel mosquitoes.

Medical sociologist Robert E. Bartholomew and author Peter Hassall cite the infamous 1909 series of sightings of the Jersey Devil (and the subsequent public panic) as a classic example of mass hysteria started by a regional urban legend.

One New Jersey group called the "Devil Hunters" refer to themselves as "official researchers of the Jersey Devil", and devote time to collecting reports, visiting historic sites, and going on nocturnal hunts in the Pine Barrens in order to "find proof that the Jersey Devil does in fact exist."

Writing in Jan Harold Brunvand's American Folklore: An Encyclopedia, Rutgers Professor Angus Kress Gillespie called the Jersey Devil "an obscure regional legend" for most of its existence, and said that "after more than 250 years in oral circulation, the legend of the 'Jersey Devil' has many variations...". Gillespie cites use of the creature's image on T-shirts, buttons, and postcards, as well as cocktails carrying its namesake, as indications that "the recent history of the Jersey Devil is more in the realm of popular culture than folklore".

Writer Dan Evon noticed some similarities between the Jersey Devil and an existing megabat species found in Africa, known as the Hammer-headed bat (Hypsignathus monstrosus). Though not native to the United States, it has been suggested as a potential candidate for the origin of the creature described in at least some sightings.

=== Hoaxes ===
Gordon Stein in Encyclopedia of Hoaxes (1993) noted that the alleged footprints of the Jersey Devil during 1909 resembled a horse's hoof. According to Stein, a man later admitted he had faked some of these footprints.

Geoff Tibballs in The World's Greatest Hoaxes (2006) has claimed that Norman Jeffries was involved in hoaxing the Jersey Devil:

Norman Jeffries, publicist for Philadelphia's Arch Street Museum and renowned hoaxer, was well aware of the stories about the Jersey Devil. So when the museum proprietor, T. F. Hopkins, admitted that it was in danger of closure unless Jeffries came up with something to boost attendances, the publicist decided that a captive Jersey Devil would be the ideal crowd-puller.

According to Tibballs, Jeffries also reportedly planted nonfictional newspaper stories about new sightings of the Jersey Devil. During 1909, Jeffries and his friend Jacob Hope, an animal trainer, purchased a kangaroo from a circus and glued artificial claws and bat wings onto it. They declared to the public they had captured the creature and it was displayed at the museum. Twenty years later, Jeffries admitted to the hoax.

== See also ==
- Belled buzzard – Legendary creature in American folklore
- Dover Demon – Alleged being sighted in Dover, Massachusetts, USA
- Fearsome critters – Tall tale animals from North American folklore
- Goatman (urban legend) – Legendary creature
- Mothman – Modern urban legend
- Nain Rouge – Legendary creature of the Detroit, Michigan, area
- Pope Lick Monster – Urban legend
- Sasquatch – Mythical creature
- Snallygaster – Legendary creature from American folklore

== Bibliography ==
- Beck, Henry Charlton (1983). Jersey Genesis: The Story of the Mullica River. New Brunswick: Rutgers University Press. ISBN 9780813510156.
