= Legends and tales of the New Jersey Pine Barrens =

Regional folklore and mythical figures

The New Jersey Pine Barrens has been the site of many legends, tales and mythical creatures, many of which have been documented by Weird NJ in its magazines and books.

== The Jersey Devil ==
The Jersey Devil is a common element of folklore in the southern New Jersey and Philadelphia areas. Due to the number of alleged sightings, many believe the Devil to be an actual animal or phenomenon similar to Bigfeet and the Yeti. Believers sometimes cite the widespread sightings by crowds of people during the "phenomenal week of 1909" as substantial evidence of some kind of occurrence. It is also held by some that the vastness and remote nature of the Pine Barrens could allow a species to remain hidden over time. Though there are indeed firm believers in the Jersey Devil (or believers that hold that the Jersey Devil sightings are the result of another animal, such as a sandhill crane or kangaroo), there are some legendary creatures in the Pine Barrens that most residents unquestionably consider legends.

== Captain Kidd ==
Pinelands folklore often mixes the legend of the ghost of Captain Kidd with that of the Jersey Devil. According to locals, New Jersey's Barnegat Bay is one of the resting places of the notorious Kidd's many treasures. During the 17th and 18th centuries, some locals told stories of the ghost of Kidd walking along the beach with the Jersey Devil. In these reports, Kidd is often headless.

== The Black Dog ==
The Black Dog is a ghostly creature said to roam the beaches and forests from Absecon Island to Barnegat Bay. In most folklore (such as English and Germanic folklore), black dog ghosts are malevolent or considered forces of evil. However, the Black Dog of the Pine Barrens is often considered a harmless spirit. According to folklore, pirates on Absecon Island attacked a ship and killed its crew. Among those killed were the cabin boy and his black dog.

== The Golden-Haired Girl ==
The Golden-Haired Girl is a ghost said to stare out into the sea, dressed in white, mourning the loss of her lover at sea. The Jersey Devil is sometimes said to sit alongside her, accompanying her on her vigil. Another legend says the Jersey Devil had a son, strangely human, who fell in love with a rich girl. However, her family did not agree with this. They took her away and she killed herself upon reaching the destination. Heartbroken, he became the next generation. Now her ghost follows him.

== The Black Doctor ==
The Black Doctor is the ghost of an African American man known as James Still. According to legend, in the 19th century, James was not permitted to practice medicine because of his race. Undiscouraged, however, James went into seclusion in the Pine Barrens to study medicine from his textbooks (in some variations, James also learns herbal remedies from the local Indigenous people). There are different versions of his death. Some say that he was unjustly lynched when local pineys found out that he was studying medicine. Others stories state that he was a hero to the piney community and died of a heart attack. The ghost is said to come to the aid of injured or stranded travelers in the Pine Barrens.

In fact, Dr. James Still was the brother of William Still, a noted abolitionist who wrote the book The Underground Railroad. Dr. Still wrote a book titled Early Recollections: The Life of Dr. James Still. He had an office in Medford, and was the third-largest landowner in town. He was self-taught in the manners of medical botany and used many herbal remedies for cures.

== The White Stag ==
The White Stag is a ghostly white deer said to aid travelers lost in the Pine Barrens. The Stag also prevents impending disasters, and is said to have stopped a stagecoach from crashing into the Batsto River. The near "disaster" in question occurred at Quaker Bridge when the horses of a stage refused to go any further. When the driver climbed off the stage, he noticed a white stag in the road which then disappeared. Walking up the road, he saw that the bridge was out. According to the legend, if you see a white stag, it is supposed to be good luck.

== See also ==
- Jersey Devil
- Black dog (ghost)
- Urban legend
- Blue Hole (New Jersey)

== Sources ==
- Brown, Edward. Just Around the Corner, in New Jersey, B B& A Publishers, 1984. ISBN 9780912608174.
- Homer, larona C.; and Bock, William Sauts. Blackbeard the pirate and other stories of the Pine Barrens, Middle Atlantic Press, 1979. ISBN 9780912608105.
- Kinsella, Michael. Legend-Tripping Online: Supernatural Folklore and the Search for Ong's Hat, University Press of Mississippi, 2011. ISBN 9781604739848
- Maloney, Nick. Beyond Area 51, Penguin Publishing, 2013. ISBN 9781101595213.
- McMahon, William. Pine Barrens Legends & Lore, B B& A Publishers, 1987. ISBN 9780912608198.
- Moran, Mark; and Sceurman, Mark. Weird N.J.: Your Travel Guide to New Jersey's Local Legends and Best Kept Secrets, Sterling Publishing Company, Inc., 2006. ISBN 9781402739415.
- Pedersen, Paul Evans, Jr. The Legendary Pine Barrens: New Tales from Old Haunts, Plexus Publishing, Incorporated, 2013. ISBN 9780937548769.
- Riley, Karen F.; and Gioulis, Andrew. Legendary Locals of the Pine Barrens of New Jersey, Arcadia Publishing, 2013. ISBN 9781467100816.
