= Blue Hole (New Jersey) =

Lake in New Jersey, United States

- Location within Gloucester County, New Jersey Location within New Jersey Location within the United States
- Interactive map of Blue Hole
- Location: Gloucester County, New Jersey and Camden County, New Jersey
- Coordinates: 39.6265°N 74.8960°W
- Basin countries: United States
- Max. width: 500 ft (150 m)
- Max. depth: 100 ft (30 m)
- Surface elevation: 75 ft (23 m)

The Blue Hole is located in the Pinelands of Monroe Township, Gloucester County, New Jersey and Winslow Township, Camden County, New Jersey. It is a clear blue body of water situated in the middle of a dense forest, with many similar such lakes in its immediate vicinity. The water has warm and cold spots, averaging 58 to 60 degrees Fahrenheit. The lake's color is unusual, as most lakes and ponds in the area are brownish due to large deposits of bog iron and the presence of tannic acid. The Blue Hole is circular and about 70 feet (21 m) across. In the 1930s, the Blue Hole was a popular party and swimming spot. A wooden footbridge over the Great Egg Harbor River that once made the Hole easily accessible was wiped out by a storm in the 1960s; now it can only be reached on foot.

The Blue Hole has been largely abandoned. There are many other 'blue holes' in the immediate vicinity, as well as quicksand and other seasonal ponds and lakes that form from springs seeping from high water table levels. The Blue Hole is not to be confused with the numerous former quarries in the area, which are much larger and have a vibrant sky blue color.

At its deepest point, the Blue Hole is 100 feet (30 m) deep. The bottom appears to consist of sand rather than mud. Swimming and diving in the Blue Hole are both illegal, but rarely enforced. It remains a popular swimming spot during the summer.

== In popular culture ==
A number of legends exist about Blue Hole, such that it is bottomless with powerful currents, that the water is freezing cold year-round, and that the Jersey Devil is active in the area.

Jersey Odysseys: Legend of the Blue Hole is a short horror film directed and written by James Rolfe.
