= Titan Leeds =

American publisher

Titan Leeds (1699–1738) was an 18th-century American almanac publisher.

Titan Leeds was a Philadelphia-based publisher of The American Almanack. He was mentioned as a "good friend and fellow student" of Benjamin Franklin in Franklin's rival publication Poor Richard's Almanack.

Titan's father, Daniel Leeds, was a devout Quaker who fell out with the local Quaker community when he began publishing the almanac in 1687. Daniel Leeds turned over publication to his son in 1716. The American Almanack pre-dated Franklin's almanac. Franklin used the first edition of his almanac to promote the hoax prediction of Leeds's death (Oct. 17, 1733, 3:29 P.M., at the very instant of the conjunction of the Sun and Mercury), and encouraged his readers to buy next year's edition of Poor Richard's Almanack to see if Franklin was right as a publicity stunt and attempt to drive Titan Leeds's American Almanack out of business.

When the date of Leeds' supposed passing had come and gone, Franklin published Leeds's obituary anyway. When challenged by the very much alive Leeds, Franklin insisted that Leeds had in fact died, but that he was being impersonated by an inferior publisher. When Leeds actually died in 1738, Franklin publicly commended the impostors for ending their charade.

== See also ==
- List of premature obituaries
