= History of the New Jersey Devils =

The history of the New Jersey Devils National Hockey League team dates back to 1982, when the Colorado Rockies moved to New Jersey and became the Devils. Since 1995, the franchise has played in the Stanley Cup Final five times, winning the Cup in 1995, 2000 and 2003.

== Kansas City and Colorado ==
In 1974, the NHL ended its first expansion period (dating back to 1967) by adding teams in Kansas City, Missouri, and Washington, D.C. Due to a rodeo being held in Kansas City's Kemper Arena, the Scouts were forced to wait nine games before making their home debut. The Scouts won for the first time in Kansas City on November 3, 1974, against their expansion brethren, the Washington Capitals, 5–4. Kansas City struggled in their inaugural season as they garnered only 41 points in 1974–75. They regressed to 36 points 1975–76 as the Scouts won only 12 games, including only one victory in their final 44 games – still the worst in franchise history as of the 2025–26 season. The Scouts failed to make the playoffs in either season in Kansas City and won only 27 of 160 games.

For their second season, the Scouts sold just 2,000 season tickets and were almost $1 million in debt. Kansas City's owners lost an estimated $5 million on the team and decided to sell after only two years. Following the 1975–76 season, the franchise was relocated to Denver, renamed the Colorado Rockies and played at the McNichols Sports Arena.

The team made a fresh start in Colorado and won its first game, 4–2 over the Toronto Maple Leafs. They looked like a possible playoff contender in 1976–77 but a collapse featuring an 18-game losing streak caused them to finish the year with a record of 20–46–14, good for 54 points. The Rockies improved to 59 points the next season but still had the sixth-worst record in the league. However, the Smythe Division was so weak that year—only the Chicago Black Hawks had a winning record—the Rockies were able to edge out the Vancouver Canucks for second place by two points. The rules of the time guaranteed a playoff spot to the top two teams in each division. The franchise's playoff debut did not last long, however, as the Philadelphia Flyers eliminated them in a two-game sweep.

A lack of stability continually plagued the team. In their first eight years, the Scouts/Rockies went through ten coaches, none lasting two full seasons. While in Denver, the team changed owners twice. Amid this instability, they never even came close to a winning season, never finishing less than 20 games under .500. Even in their sole playoff season in Denver, they were 21 games under .500.

Prior to the 1978–79 season, owner Jack Vickers sold the team to New Jersey trucking tycoon Arthur Imperatore, who announced that he intended to move the team to the New Jersey Meadowlands in East Rutherford. Imperatore's plan received criticism, as it would have resulted in the Rockies moving to a location near the markets of three existing teams: the New York Islanders, New York Rangers, and Flyers. Also, there was no facility in New Jersey that was suitable even for temporary use. Imperatore initially planned to share Madison Square Garden with the Rangers for two seasons until a new arena was completed. However, Flyers owner Ed Snider announced his opposition to the move; this effectively blocked the Rockies' relocation, as in those days a unanimous vote by league owners was necessary for a franchise to move. In 1979, the team hired Don Cherry as head coach and traded for Maple Leafs star Lanny McDonald. Despite these moves, the Rockies still posted the worst record in the NHL and Cherry was fired after the season. Businessman Peter Gilbert purchased the Rockies from Imperatore in 1980. They played in Colorado through the 1981–82 season with the possibility of moving; Gilbert's losses on the team reached an estimated $4.5 million in 1981–82. However, his desire to relocate the franchise to New Jersey was not shared by the NHL. Gilbert sold the Rockies to a three-man group headed by New Jersey shipping magnate and Jersey City native John McMullen (who also owned Major League Baseball's Houston Astros) on May 27, 1982. McMullen announced that the Rockies would move to East Rutherford and play at Brendan Byrne Arena in the Meadowlands (which opened the previous year), as the NHL's board of governors had approved the relocation. As part of the relocation deal, the Devils had to compensate the Islanders, Rangers and Flyers for encroaching on the established teams' territory. The combined total the Devils owed the three teams was nearly $20 million.

== New Jersey ==
=== 1982–1993: Building the foundation ===
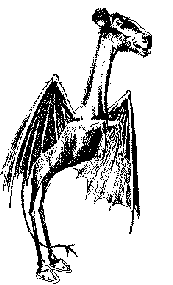
The Jersey Devil served as the inspiration for the team's name.

On June 30, 1982, the team was renamed the New Jersey Devils, after the legend of the Jersey Devil, a legendary creature that supposedly inhabited the Pine Barrens of South Jersey. Over 10,000 people voted in a contest to select the name. The team began play in East Rutherford, New Jersey, at the Brendan Byrne Arena, later renamed the Continental Airlines Arena and eventually the Izod Center, where they would call home through the 2006–07 season. With their relocation, the newly rechristened Devils were placed in the Wales Conference's Patrick Division. The Devils' first game ended in a 3–3 tie with the Pittsburgh Penguins on October 5, 1982. Their first win, a 3–2 victory, came in New Jersey at the expense of the Rangers. The team finished with a 17–49–14 record, putting them three points above last place in the Patrick Division.

In the following season, the Devils were criticized by Wayne Gretzky after they were blown out 13–4 by his team, the Edmonton Oilers. Gretzky was upset that former teammate Ron Low played for what he considered an inferior team, and in a post-game interview said:

"They are putting a Mickey Mouse operation on the ice. They struggled in Kansas City, they were awful in Colorado and now look what is happening. [Devils management] had better start getting better personnel and start putting them on the ice. It is ruining hockey.

Later, Gretzky publicly admitted that his comment was "blown all out of proportion." In response, many Devils fans wore Mickey Mouse apparel when the Oilers returned to New Jersey.

In the 1983–84 season, the Devils hosted the annual NHL All-Star Game at the Brendan Byrne Arena. Chico Resch was the winning goaltender, and Devils defenseman Joe Cirella tallied a goal as the Wales Conference beat the Campbell Conference 7–6. However, the team did not achieve much success. Head coach Bill MacMillan was fired midway through the season and replaced with Tom McVie, and the Devils won only 17 games. After the season, McVie was replaced by Doug Carpenter.

Meanwhile, with new ownership in place, the Devils began a slow journey to respectability. They assembled a nucleus of young players; John MacLean, Bruce Driver, Ken Daneyko, Kirk Muller and Pat Verbeek all complemented the veteran goaltender Resch. The team's record improved each season between 1983–84 and 1986–87. However, playing in a division where the Flyers, Capitals, and Islanders provided strong competition for most of the 1980s, the Devils found themselves unable to reach the playoffs. They finished last in the six-team Patrick Division in 1985–86 and 1986–87 despite improving their point totals to 59 and 64, respectively.

On January 22, 1987, a massive blizzard hit the metropolitan area resulting in only 334 fans attending the game between the Devils and the Calgary Flames at Brendan Byrne Arena, where the Devils rallied to win 7–5. The Devils officially recognized the fans that made the journey to the game as the "334 Club". The fans received a letter that read, "You are hereby inducted and given lifetime membership to a club that cannot grow – the 334 Club".

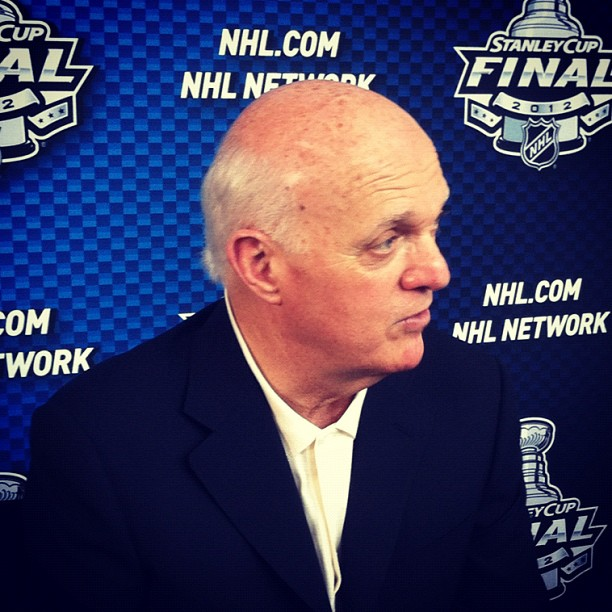
Lou Lamoriello in May 2012. He served as the team's president from April 1987 to July 2015.

In a move that Daneyko and MacLean later credited with helping to turn around the franchise's fortunes, McMullen hired Providence College athletic director Lou Lamoriello as team president in April 1987. Lamoriello appointed himself general manager before the 1987–88 season. Although Lamoriello had been a college coach for 15 years, he was seen as "an NHL outsider, and therefore a bit of a quirky fit", according to Kevin Paul Dupont of The Boston Globe.

The 1987–88 Devils garnered the first winning record in the franchise's 14-year history. In the final game of the regular season, they beat the Blackhawks 4–3 on an overtime goal by MacLean, sending them to the playoffs for the first time in New Jersey.

The team made it all the way to the conference finals, but lost to the Boston Bruins in seven games. In that series, head coach Jim Schoenfeld verbally abused referee Don Koharski after the third game. During the exchange, Koharski slipped and fell. Claims were made that Schoenfeld had pushed him, but video evidence indicates that Koharski fell down. As Koharski snapped that Schoenfeld was "gone", Schoenfeld replied, "Good, 'cause you fell you fat pig. Have another doughnut." League vice president Brian O'Neill ordered Schoenfeld to sit out Game 4. No hearing took place before the suspension. Claiming Schoenfeld's rights had been violated, the Devils appealed to New Jersey Superior Court judge James F. Madden, who issued a temporary restraining order that blocked the suspension. In his order, Madden pointed out that the NHL's investigation consisted of two phone calls—one to Koharski and one to Schoenfeld—and criticized O'Neill for not reviewing the videotape. In protest, referee Dave Newell and linesmen Gord Broseker and Ray Scapinello refused to work the game. After more than an hour's delay, three off-ice officials—Paul McInnis, Jim Sullivan and Vin Godleski—were tracked down to work the game. McInnis served as the referee, while Sullivan and Godleski worked the lines wearing yellow scrimmage sweaters. Notably, NHL President John Ziegler was away on personal business and could not be contacted, leaving Chicago Blackhawks owner Bill Wirtz, as chairman of the NHL's board of governors, to give the order to play the game with backup officials.

Ziegler conducted a hearing on May 10, and suspended Schoenfeld for game five and fined him $1,000; the Devils were fined $10,000. Schoenfeld later admitted he regretted his comments. Nonetheless, Devils fans and broadcasters claimed that the officials shortchanged them for several years afterward.

The next season, the Devils once again slipped below .500 and missed the playoffs. Lamoriello made several postseason player changes, notably signing of two Soviet stars—Viacheslav Fetisov and Sergei Starikov. The Devils drafted Fetisov years earlier in the 1983 entry draft, but the Soviet government did not allow Fetisov, who was an army officer as well as a member of the national team, to leave the country. Shortly after, the Devils signed Fetisov's defense partner, Alexei Kasatonov. The team changed coaches midway through each of the next two seasons. Schoenfeld was replaced with John Cunniff in 1989–90, and Tom McVie was re-hired midway through the 1990–91 season and helmed the team through its third-straight first-round elimination in 1991–92. Herb Brooks, who coached the 1980 "Miracle on Ice" team, was brought in for the 1992–93 season, but when the team yet again was eliminated in the first round, he was fired and replaced with former Montreal Canadiens coach Jacques Lemaire.

=== 1993–2000: A championship franchise ===
With the NHL realigning their conferences and divisions for the 1993–94 season, the Devils were now members of the Eastern Conference's Atlantic Division. Under Lemaire, the team roared through the 1993–94 regular season with a lineup including defensemen Scott Stevens, Scott Niedermayer and Ken Daneyko, forwards Stephane Richer, John MacLean, Bobby Holik and Claude Lemieux, and goaltenders Chris Terreri and Martin Brodeur, the latter goaltender being honored as the League's top rookie with the Calder Memorial Trophy. The Devils' first 100-point season earned them the NHL's second-best record behind the New York Rangers. However, due to the NHL's new playoff format, the Devils were seeded third in the East, behind the Atlantic Division champion Rangers and Northeast Division champion Pittsburgh. The Devils and Rangers met in a memorable Eastern Conference finals match up, which went seven games. The Devils had lost all six regular season meetings to the Rangers, but were up for the challenge, after Richer scored the game-winning goal in the second overtime of Game 1. Going into Game 6, the Devils led the series 3–2 after having dominated game five in Madison Square Garden. Before the game, Rangers captain Mark Messier made his famous guarantee that the Rangers would win Game 6. Keeping true to his word, Messier led his team back, netting a natural hat-trick, and leading the Rangers to a 4–2 victory after the Devils were up 2–0. In Game 7, the Devils' Valeri Zelepukin tied the game with 7.7 seconds remaining, but the Devils were defeated in double overtime, on a goal by Stephane Matteau. Devils fans, however, claimed that Esa Tikkanen was in the crease, and the goal should have been wiped out. Nonetheless, the series is viewed by many hockey fans as one of the best playoff series in NHL history.

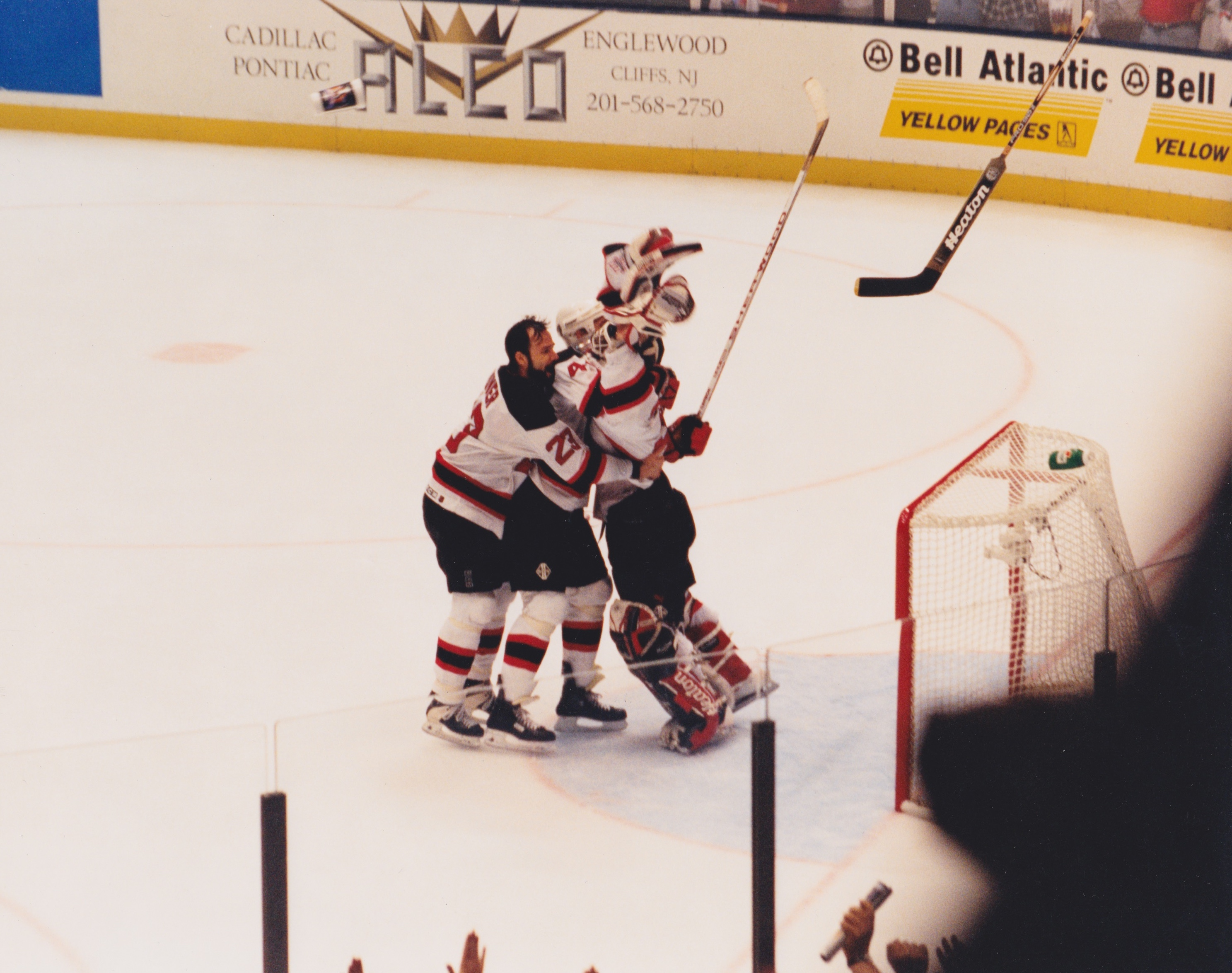
The Devils celebrate moments after winning the 1995 Stanley Cup Final. The victory brought the club its first Stanley Cup.

Despite the setback, the team returned to the Eastern Conference finals during the lockout-shortened 1995 season and defeated the Philadelphia Flyers four games to two. They swept the heavily favored Detroit Red Wings to win New Jersey's first-ever Stanley Cup, and the first major professional sports championship in the state's history, as they brought the Stanley Cup across the Hudson River from "the Garden to the Garden State", with the Rangers having won the Stanley Cup the year before. Claude Lemieux was awarded the Conn Smythe Trophy as playoffs MVP. The Devils established an NHL record by posting 11 road victories in one playoff season. The success also came amid constant rumors that the team would move for the third time in its history to Nashville (which would get their own NHL expansion team in the Predators in 1998). Scared at the embarrassing thought of losing the reigning champions, the State of New Jersey agreed to fund a renovation of the soon after renamed Continental Airlines Arena.

The Devils missed the playoffs by two points the following season with a 37–33–12 record, being defeated by the Tampa Bay Lightning for the last playoff spot in the East in the regular season finale 5–2. It marked the first time in 26 years that a defending Cup champion failed to reach the playoffs. For most of the remainder of the decade, the Devils failed to live up to expectations. Despite annually having one of the best regular season records in the league, they were ousted by the New York Rangers in the second round of the 1997 playoffs, and were eliminated in the first round by the Ottawa Senators a year later. Lemaire resigned after that season and was replaced by assistant coach Robbie Ftorek. However, the next season ended as the previous one, with a first-round loss, this time to the Pittsburgh Penguins.

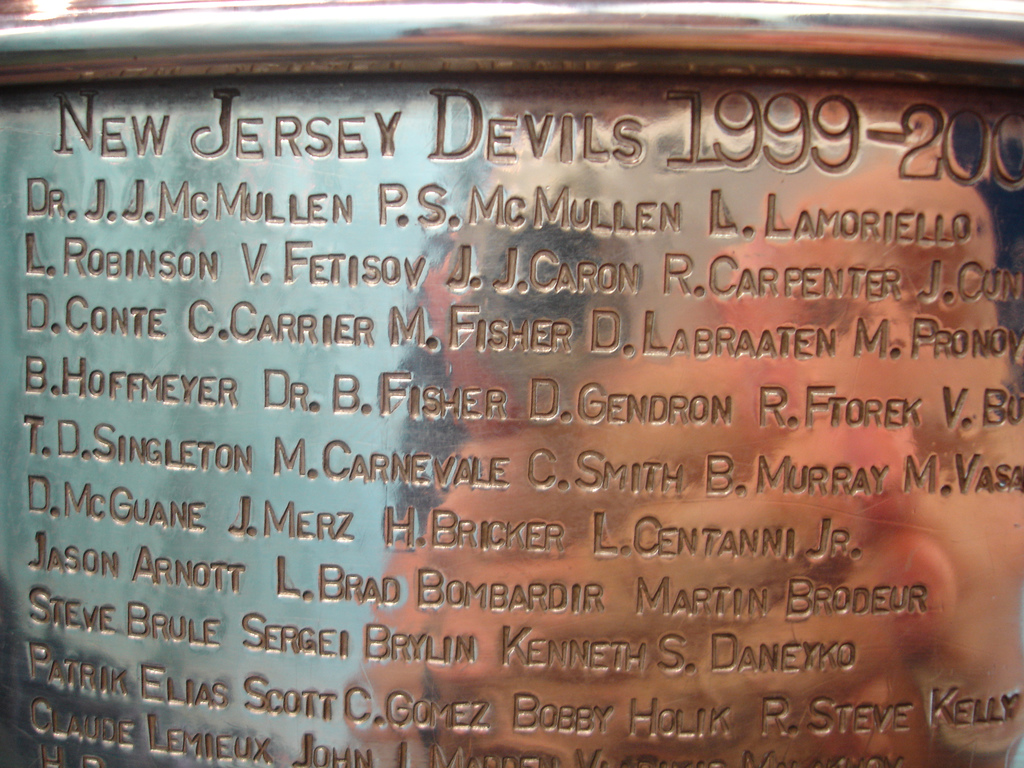
The 1999–2000 Devils engraved on the Stanley Cup. The club won its second Stanley Cup that season.

Late in the 1999–2000 season, Lamoriello made the controversial decision to fire Ftorek and replace him with assistant coach Larry Robinson. The Devils had the fourth-best record in the NHL, but Lamoriello feared that a late-season swoon would turn into another early-round playoff collapse. The move paid off, as New Jersey defeated the Florida Panthers, the Toronto Maple Leafs and the Philadelphia Flyers to make the Stanley Cup Final. In the Finals, the Devils reached the top again, defeating the defending champion Dallas Stars in six games to win the Stanley Cup for the second time. Scott Stevens, Bobby Holik, Scott Niedermayer and Martin Brodeur, all integral parts of the 1995 team, were augmented with new players acquired in the intervening five years, including Patrik Elias, Petr Sykora, Jason Arnott, Alexander Mogilny and rookies Brian Rafalski, John Madden and Calder Trophy recipient Scott Gomez. A highlight of the Devils' second championship run was their come-from-behind victory in the conference finals. They trailed Philadelphia three games to one, but rebounded to win three straight-games and the series. This was both the first time in Devils playoff history and in NHL Conference finals history that a 3–1 deficit was surmounted. This series was also remembered for the hit that captain Scott Stevens laid on Flyers center Eric Lindros, effectively ending Lindros' career in Philadelphia. Stevens was named the winner of the Conn Smythe Trophy, and assisted on Jason Arnott's Stanley Cup-clinching goal in double-overtime of game six in Dallas.

Shortly before this victory, McMullen sold the team to Puck Holdings, an affiliate of YankeeNets, for $175 million. The owners wanted to use the Devils and the National Basketball Association's New Jersey Nets (also a tenant at Continental Airlines Arena) for programming on what eventually became the YES Network and move both teams to a new arena in Newark. Neither of these proposals became reality under Puck Holdings' ownership. The new owners largely left the Devils' operations in Lamoriello's hands. For the start of the next season, Lamoriello was appointed CEO of both the Devils and Nets. He remained at the helm of the basketball team until it was sold with the intention of moving it to Brooklyn.

=== 2001–2007: A third Cup and the lockout ===
Led by the Patrik Elias–Jason Arnott–Petr Sykora line ("The A Line"), Bobby Holik and the goaltending of Martin Brodeur, the Devils reached the Stanley Cup Final for the second-straight year in 2001. They lost the series, however, to the Colorado Avalanche despite leading 3–2 and having game six on home ice; Brodeur had a subpar series, with a save percentage under .900, and was bested by Colorado and future Hockey Hall of Fame goaltender Patrick Roy. The team's strong regular season was recognized at the NHL's annual awards that year, with John Madden becoming the first player in franchise history to win the Frank J. Selke Trophy (for top defensive forward), along with Brodeur and Scott Stevens named as finalists for the Vezina Trophy (top goaltender) and Norris Trophy (top defenseman) awards, respectively.

In the 2001–02 season, New Jersey were expected to be contenders once again, and they finished the season as the third best team in the Atlantic Division, with 95 points. The Devils entered the playoffs as the sixth seed, but lost in the first round to the third-seeded Carolina Hurricanes.

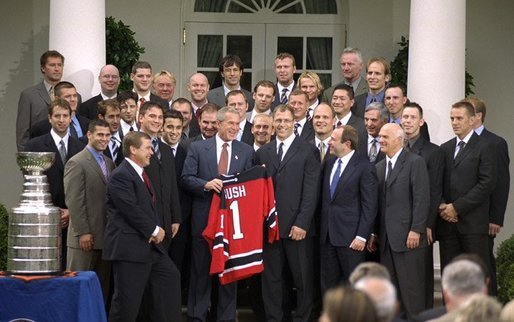
The Devils present President George W. Bush with a jersey after winning the 2003 Stanley Cup championship.

In 2003, the Devils finished first in the Atlantic Division with 108 points, earning the second seed in the East. Their playoff run included a seven-game Conference Final victory, decided in the final three minutes on a goal by newly acquired forward Jeff Friesen, over the Ottawa Senators, who won the Presidents' Trophy that season. In the Stanley Cup Final, the Devils and Mighty Ducks of Anaheim had a back-and-forth battle, with both teams winning only their home games. This was the first time since 1965 that all the games in the Stanley Cup Final were won by the home team. The Devils brought the Stanley Cup to New Jersey a third time, however, after defeating the Mighty Ducks in game seven in New Jersey. Martin Brodeur, Scott Stevens, Scott Niedermayer, Ken Daneyko and Sergei Brylin each won their third Cup, and after the series, Daneyko, a long-time fan favorite, announced his retirement. Despite Anaheim not being able to complete their Cinderella run, the Conn Smythe Trophy for playoff MVP was awarded to their goaltender Jean-Sebastien Giguere, the first player not on the championship team to be named playoff MVP since Ron Hextall in 1987. Some hockey writers speculated a New Jersey player did not win because there were multiple candidates, resulting in a split vote among the sportswriters who select the winner. Brodeur, however, was awarded the Vezina Trophy as outstanding goaltender in the regular season for the first time in his career. The New Jersey Nets were in their finals at the same time the Devils won this Stanley Cup, but lost to the San Antonio Spurs in six, which denied the state of New Jersey from having both NBA and NHL championships in the same year.

In the 2003–04 season, Martin Brodeur took home the Vezina Trophy again. Despite the loss of long-time team captain Scott Stevens, the Devils finished second in the Atlantic Division with 100 points. With the sixth seed in the Stanley Cup playoffs, the Devils lost to the Philadelphia Flyers four games to one. In March 2004, near the end of the season, Lehman Brothers executive Jeff Vanderbeek purchased a controlling interest from Puck Holdings and resigned from Lehman Brothers to assume full-time ownership. He had been a minority owner since the 2000 sale. Like Puck Holdings/YankeeNets, Vanderbeek largely left the Devils in Lamoriello's hands.

Vanderbeek was a strong proponent of the proposed arena in Newark, which first received funding from the city council during Puck Holdings' ownership in 2002. After legal battles over both eminent domain and the city's financial participation in the arena project, the final deal was approved by council in October 2004, and the groundbreaking occurred almost exactly a year later. Nonetheless, in January 2006, financial issues threatened to halt the deal, as the Devils did not provide the City with a required letter of credit until the last possible day.

Though construction was well underway, in late summer 2006, Cory Booker, who had recently taken office as Mayor of Newark, promised to reevaluate the deal and considered backing out. In October, Booker conceded there would be "a first-class arena built in the city of Newark, whether we like it or not", and soon after the Devils struck a deal including both property and monetary givebacks that appeased city officials. The arena, which was named the Prudential Center when Newark-based Prudential Financial purchased naming rights in early 2007, opened shortly after the start of the 2007–08 season.

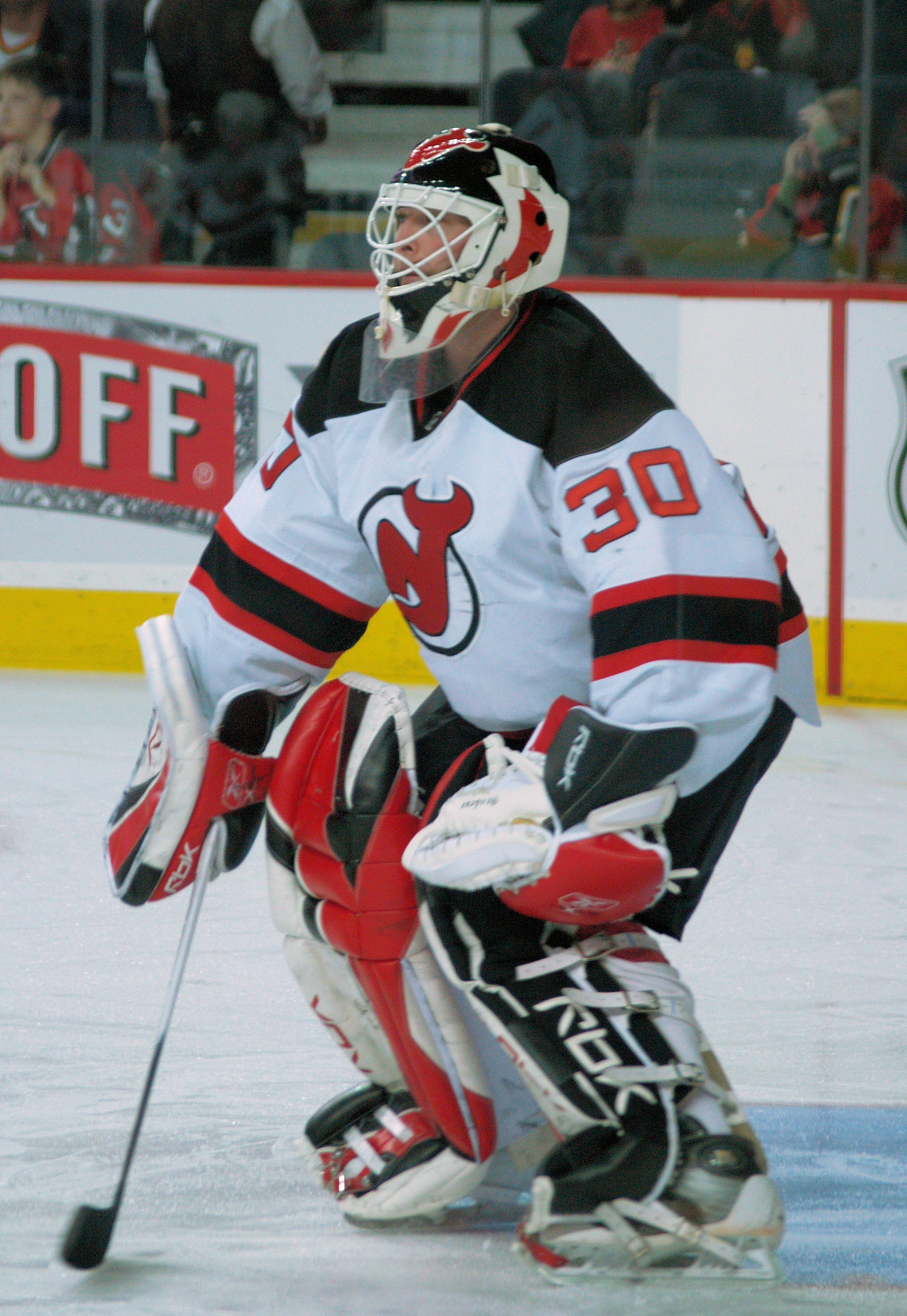
Goaltender Martin Brodeur has led the Devils to three Stanley Cup championships, and he is the NHL's all-time leader in goaltender wins, shutouts and awarded goals.

During the 2004–05 NHL lockout, many Devils players played in European leagues and in the hockey world championships. Patrik Elias, who was playing in the Russian Superleague (RSL), contracted hepatitis A. Faced with Elias' indefinite recovery timetable, plus the loss of defensive stalwarts Scott Niedermayer to free agency and Scott Stevens to retirement, Lamoriello signed veteran defenseman Dan McGillis and two former Devils—winger Alexander Mogilny and defenseman Vladimir Malakhov, none of whom finished the season on the ice. In July 2005, the team announced that head coach Pat Burns would not return for the 2005–06 season after being diagnosed with cancer for the second time in little more than a year. Assistant coach Larry Robinson, the team's head coach from 2000 to 2002, was promoted to start the season.

The Devils struggled early in the 2005–06 season, ending the 2005 calendar year with a 16–18–5 record. Robinson resigned as head coach on December 19, and Lamoriello moved down to the bench. Once Elias returned from his bout with hepatitis, the team quickly turned around, finishing 46–27–9 after a season-ending eleven-game winning streak capped with a dramatic 4–3 win over the Montreal Canadiens. During that final victory, which clinched the Devils' sixth division title, Brian Gionta set a new team record for goals in a season with 48, topping Pat Verbeek's 46. The win streak to close the year was also an NHL record.

On April 29, 2006, the Devils won their first round Stanley Cup playoff series against the New York Rangers four games to none, extending their winning streak to 15 games and marking the first time the Devils defeated their cross-river rival in a playoff series. The team's season ended in the next round with a 4–1 game five loss to the Carolina Hurricanes, who eventually won the Stanley Cup.

In the off-season, the Devils hired former Montreal Canadiens coach Claude Julien to replace Lamoriello behind the bench. In the last week of the 2006–07 Devils season, however, with just three games left, Julien was fired and Lamoriello once again reprised his interim coaching role. The move is reminiscent of Robbie Ftorek's firing with eight games left in the 1999–2000 season, after which the Devils won the Stanley Cup. Lamoriello defended the move saying, "I don't think we're at a point of being ready both mentally and [physically] to play the way that is necessary going into the playoffs." The Devils went on to win their seventh Atlantic Division title and earn the second seed in the Eastern Conference after finishing ahead of the Pittsburgh Penguins by two points. They defeated the Tampa Bay Lightning in six games in the first round, but struggled against the fourth-seeded Ottawa Senators in the Eastern Conference semifinals and lost to them in five games. Their final loss of the series on May 5, 2007, marked the final game of the Devils' 25-year history at the Continental Airlines Arena.

=== 2007–2013: Move to Newark and return to the Finals ===
During the move to Newark, the Devils lost a few prominent members. On July 1, 2007, long-time Devils Scott Gomez and Brian Rafalski left the team as unrestricted free agents; Gomez to the rival Rangers and Rafalski to his hometown Detroit Red Wings. Back-up goaltender Scott Clemmensen went to Toronto, and local favorite, forward Jim Dowd, signed with Philadelphia. The Devils, however, were able to sign Buffalo Sabres forward Dainius Zubrus and Rangers defenseman Karel Rachunek. On July 5, the Devils signed Rangers goaltender Kevin Weekes as a backup to Brodeur, as well as Nashville Predators defenseman Vitaly Vishnevski on July 10.

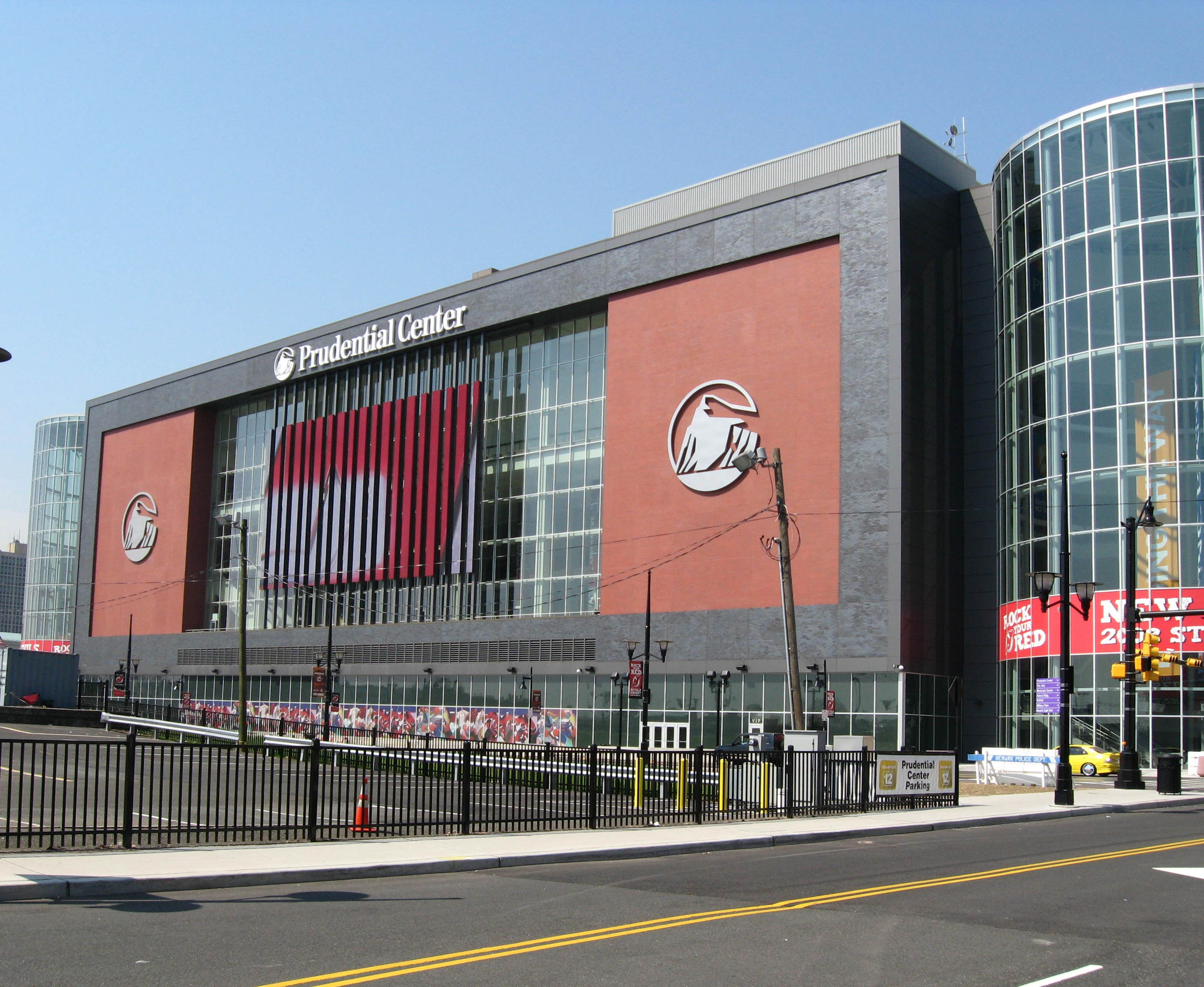
The Prudential Center has served as the Devils` home arena since 2007.

On July 13, 2007, Brent Sutter was named the 14th head coach of the team. Previous coach Larry Robinson was named to aide John MacLean as the second assistant coach. On August 7, 2007, the Devils signed former Islander Arron Asham. As the Devils preseason came to an end, prospects Niclas Bergfors and David Clarkson made the final roster. The Devils opened their new arena, the Prudential Center, on October 27, 2007, against Ottawa after opening the season with a nine-game road trip. The game ended with a 4–1 win for Ottawa.

On October 31, 2007, the New Jersey Devils won their first home game at the Prudential Center by beating Tampa Bay 6–1. In a dramatic last game of the season against the Rangers, the Devils won in a shootout, giving them home ice advantage over the Rangers in the playoffs, though the Devils lost the series against the Rangers 4–1, losing all three games at home. Brodeur did win the Vezina Trophy for the fourth time in five years for his performance in the regular season.

For the 2008–09 season, the Devils signed Brian Rolston, Bobby Holik, Brendan Shanahan, Michael Rupp and Scott Clemmensen, all making their second stints with the team. The Devils' season looked to be in jeopardy after Brodeur tore a biceps tendon in November and was sidelined for four months, but strong play by scoring leader Zach Parise and backup goaltender Clemmensen kept the Devils atop the NHL standings. Brodeur would return strong and make history. On March 17, 2009, before a sellout home crowd, Brodeur broke Patrick Roy's record for regular season wins with his 552nd victory, while Patrik Elias became the franchise's all-time leading scorer with his 702nd point. In the opening round of the 2009 playoffs, the Devils suffered two losses to the Hurricanes within the final minute of regulation play. In Game 4, the Devils overcame a three-goal deficit, only to lose on a goal with 0.2 seconds left in the game in which Brodeur claimed he was interfered with. The team was eliminated in a game seven loss in which the Hurricanes scored two goals in the last one minute and twenty seconds of the game to erase a 3–2 Devils lead.

On June 9, 2009, the New Jersey Devils announced that head coach Brent Sutter was stepping down from his position, citing personal and family reasons. In a controversial move three days later, however, Sutter was introduced as the new head coach of the Calgary Flames. A month later, the Devils named former head coach Jacques Lemaire as his replacement. Assistant coach John MacLean was named head coach of the Lowell Devils, New Jersey's American Hockey League (AHL) affiliate. After the free agency period opened on July 1, 2009, career-long Devils John Madden and Brian Gionta left to sign with the Chicago Blackhawks and Montreal Canadiens, respectively. Additionally, Scott Clemmensen signed with Florida and Michael Rupp with Pittsburgh. All four had won the Stanley Cup with New Jersey.

After several weeks of fruitless contract negotiations late in the season, the Atlanta Thrashers traded star left wing Ilya Kovalchuk, along with defenseman and former Devil Anssi Salmela, to the Devils on February 4, 2010, in exchange for defenseman Johnny Oduya and forward Niclas Bergfors, prospect Patrice Cormier and a first-round draft pick in 2010. The Devils finished the season in first place in the Atlantic and second in the East. Their seeding matched them up against Philadelphia in the first round, who eliminated the Devils four games to one. Kovalchuk was held to two goals in the series.

After head coach Lemaire retired from coaching, the Devils announced that the team's all-time leading scorer, John MacLean, would become their new head coach. Former team head and assistant coach Larry Robinson and former NHL All-Star Adam Oates joined MacLean as his assistants. During the off-season, the Devils signed Ilya Kovalchuk to a 17-year contract, keeping him in New Jersey until the conclusion of the 2026–27 season. The contract was the longest contract ever held by an NHL player, beating out Rick DiPietro's 15-year contract with the New York Islanders. The League, however, rejected Kovalchuk's contract for allegedly circumventing the NHL Collective Bargaining Agreement and Kovalchuk became a free agent for two months before the NHL officially accepted a 15-year contract worth $100 million.

John MacLean led the team to a record of 9–22–2, and after sitting in last place in the NHL on December 23, he was removed in favor of Jacques Lemaire, who came out of retirement for his third stint as head coach of the Devils and second in less than two seasons. During the tumultuous season, the Devils lost superstar Zach Parise to a meniscus tear in November and he finally returned in March for just one game in which the Devils were mathematically eliminated from playoff contention. Adding to the team's woes, Martin Brodeur suffered two multi-game injuries, an elbow injury in November and a minor knee sprain in February. Following the trade of captain Jamie Langenbrunner to the Dallas Stars, the Devils managed an astonishing turnaround with an impressive run of 26–7–3. They saw a dramatic increase in offensive production, in addition to the outstanding performance of backup goaltender Johan Hedberg. On March 12, the Devils found themselves just six points out of a final playoff spot. The other major trade of the season was Jason Arnott to the Washington Capitals in exchange for center Dave Steckel and a second-round draft pick.

During their astonishing late Winter run, the players did not talk about any playoff aspirations and maintained the motto of "one game at a time." Head coach Lemaire also refused to talk about the team's playoff potential and told reporters to ask him about the Devils' chances once they were five points back. The Devils ultimately came within one point of Lemaire's benchmark but were eliminated by Montreal on April 2, 2011, thus missing out on the playoffs for the first time since the 1995–96 season. After winning their last game of the season, Lemaire announced that he would not return as head coach for another season with the Devils. Overall, this was the first losing season for the Devils since 1990–91.

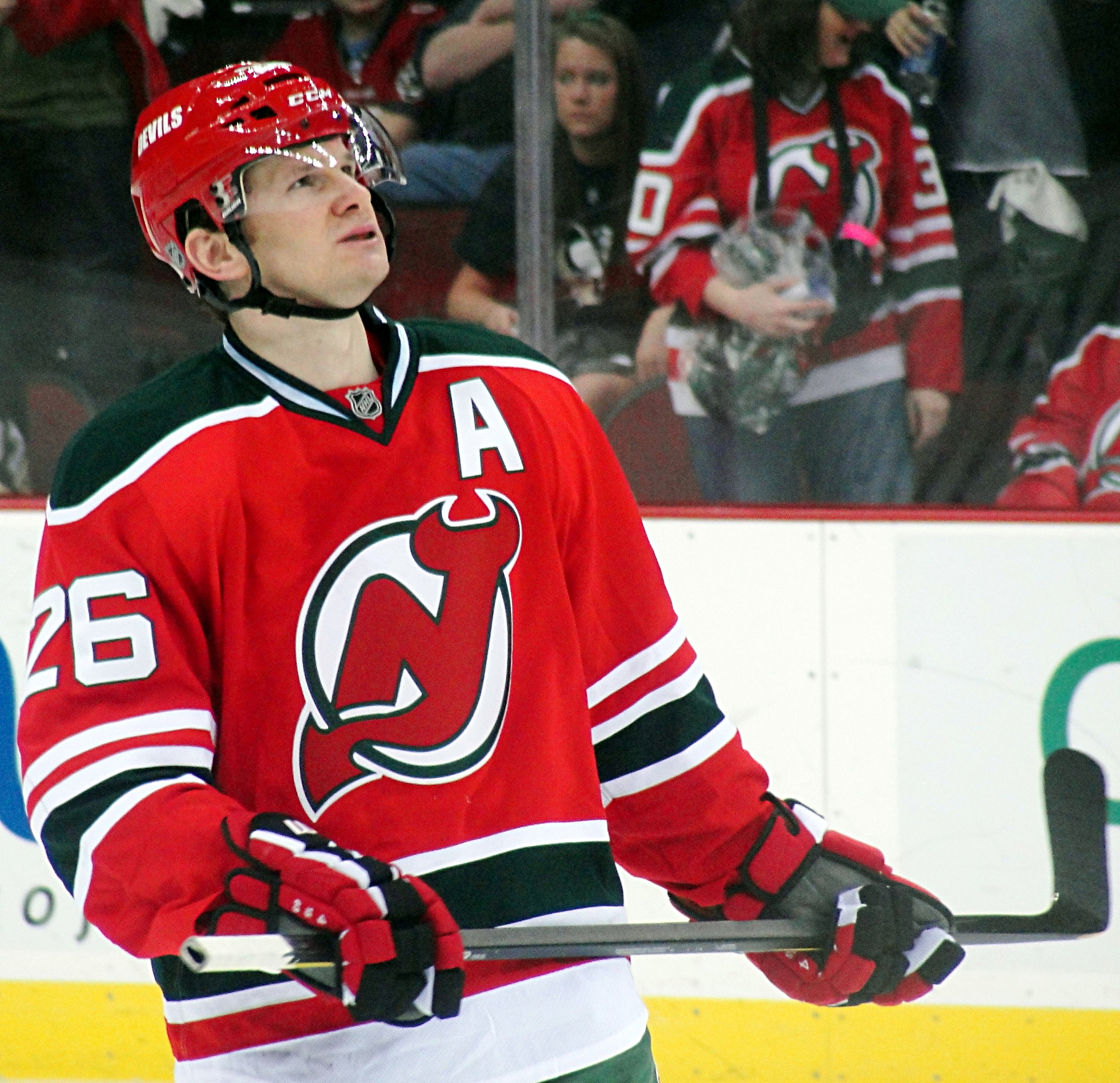
Patrik Elias with the Devils the 2011–12 season. Elias was one of two Devils who finished among the League's top-ten point scorer.

In the 2011 off-season, Lemaire was replaced by former Florida head coach Peter DeBoer. After winning the 2011 NHL entry draft lottery, the Devils drafted defenseman Adam Larsson fourth overall along with several other key prospects. In addition to drafting and later signing Larsson, the Devils traded away veteran forward Brian Rolston while signing former Devils "A-Line" star Petr Sykora to a one-year contract. The Devils team continued to grow and develop during the regular season, while the Devils' offense came out strong in DeBoer's new system. Led by Ilya Kovalchuk, Patrik Elias and Zach Parise, the team posed a significant offensive threat that year, bearing seven 40-point scorers by the season's end. The Devils' special teams was also notably exceptional, breaking an NHL record for the best regular season penalty kill since before the Expansion Era. Important late season acquisitions, including defenseman Marek Zidlicky (who was traded for three players and two draft picks) and winger Alexei Ponikarovsky (who was traded for a player and a draft pick), became valuable assets during the later months and the postseason, with Zidlicky becoming the Devils' key offensive defenseman on the power play. Kovalchuk and Elias both finished as League top-ten point scorers during the regular seasons, with 83 and 78 points, respectively. Forwards Kovalchuk, Parise and David Clarkson all scored over 30 goals during the regular season while rookie forward Adam Henrique totaled 51 points and earned a Calder Trophy nomination for NHL rookie of the year.

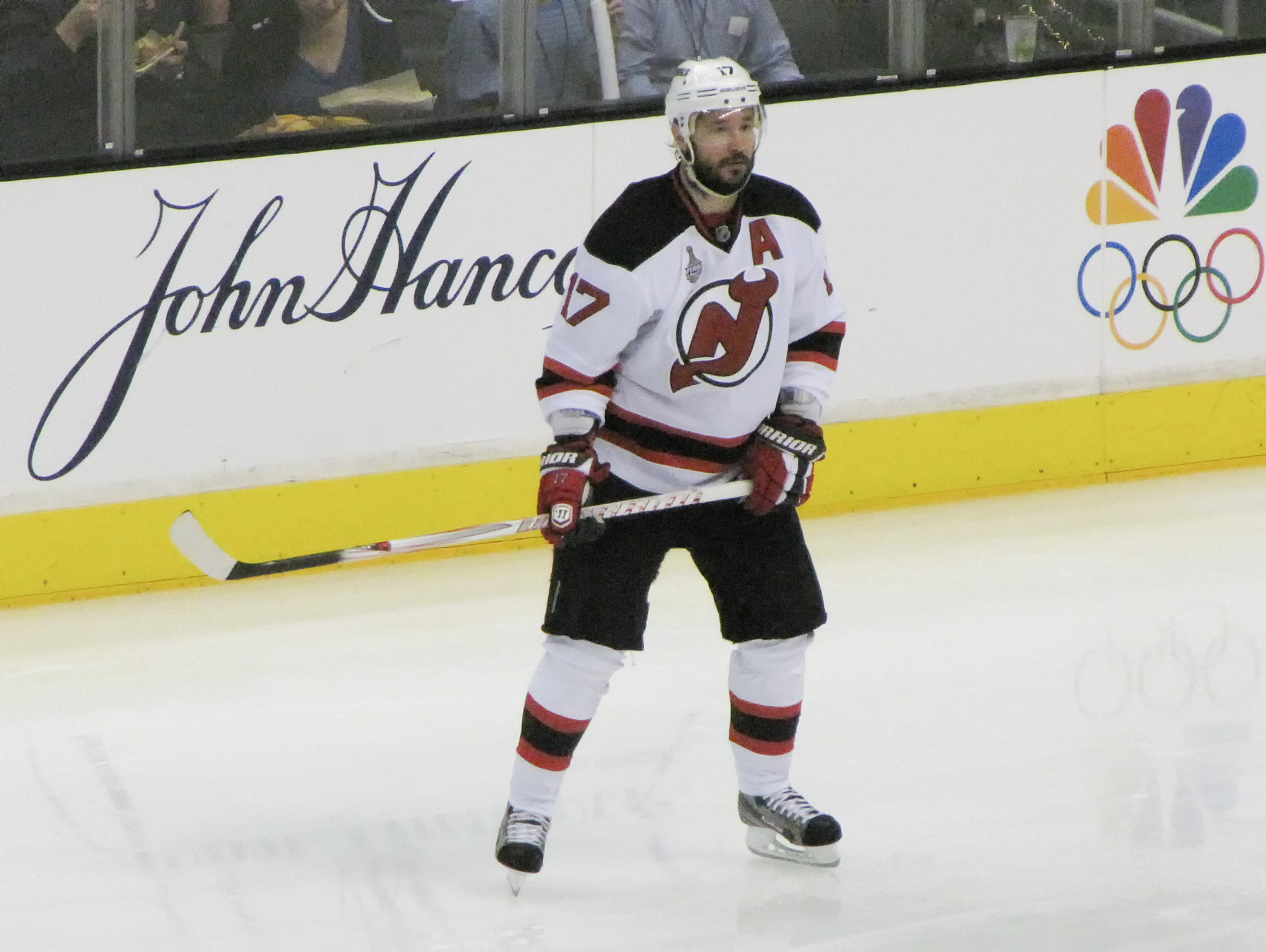
Ilya Kovalchuk with the Devils during the 2012 Stanley Cup Final.

The Devils finished the regular season as the sixth seed in the East with 102 points. Returning injured center Travis Zajac led the team's offense as they then proceeded to knock the Florida Panthers out of the playoffs in seven games, winning game six in overtime with a goal from Zajac and another in double overtime in game seven from Henrique. They moved on to play their Atlantic Division rivals, the Philadelphia Flyers, in the Conference semifinals and were considered heavy underdogs in the series. They faced some early setbacks against the Flyers, including a game one overtime loss and the injury of All-Star Kovalchuk. The Devils, however, rallied in game two without their star forward, winning the game 4–1. Kovalchuk returned strong for game three with a goal and two assists, including the game-winning assist to Alexei Ponikarovsky in overtime. The streak continued as the Devils would win four in a row to eventually defeat the Flyers and advance to the Eastern Conference finals for the first time since 2003. The Devils would play the Rangers in the conference finals, a rematch of the 1994 series that resulted in a heartbreaking game seven overtime loss during Martin Brodeur's rookie season. The series was highly publicized by the New York media and was a tough back-and-forth battle for the first four games, leaving the series split at two games apiece. The Devils' fourth line, which had been very successful throughout the playoffs, came through in game five to help give the Devils a 3–2 lead in the series. The line consisted of players Ryan Carter, Stephen Gionta and Steve Bernier, all of which had been dropped from a professional roster at some point during the season. Emerging as playoff heroes, they tallied an impressive 19 points in the first three rounds. Despite constant comparisons to the 1994 series, the Devils and Brodeur rewrote history and claimed victory on May 25, 2012, as Henrique scored another series clinching overtime goal in game six to advance the Devils to the Stanley Cup Final against the Los Angeles Kings. The Devils dropped the first two games in overtime in Newark, then were shut out in game three as Los Angeles took a 3–0 series lead. The Devils won Games 4 and 5 to become only the third team in NHL history to force a game six in the Finals after being behind three games to none, but Los Angeles eliminated the Devils in game six to win their first Stanley Cup in franchise history. Brodeur later signed with the team for two additional years, ending speculation that his career was over despite the fact he turned 40 on May 6, 2012, in New Jersey's game four tilt with Philadelphia.

The 2012 off-season was a busy one. On July 4, Zach Parise signed a 13-year, $98 million contract with the Minnesota Wild, leaving the Devils after one season as team captain. Weeks later, on July 17, the Devils announced former defenseman and team captain Scott Stevens would return to the team as an assistant coach, as well as the addition of Matt Shaw—formerly working with the San Jose Sharks—as the team's offensive assistant coach running the team's power play unit.

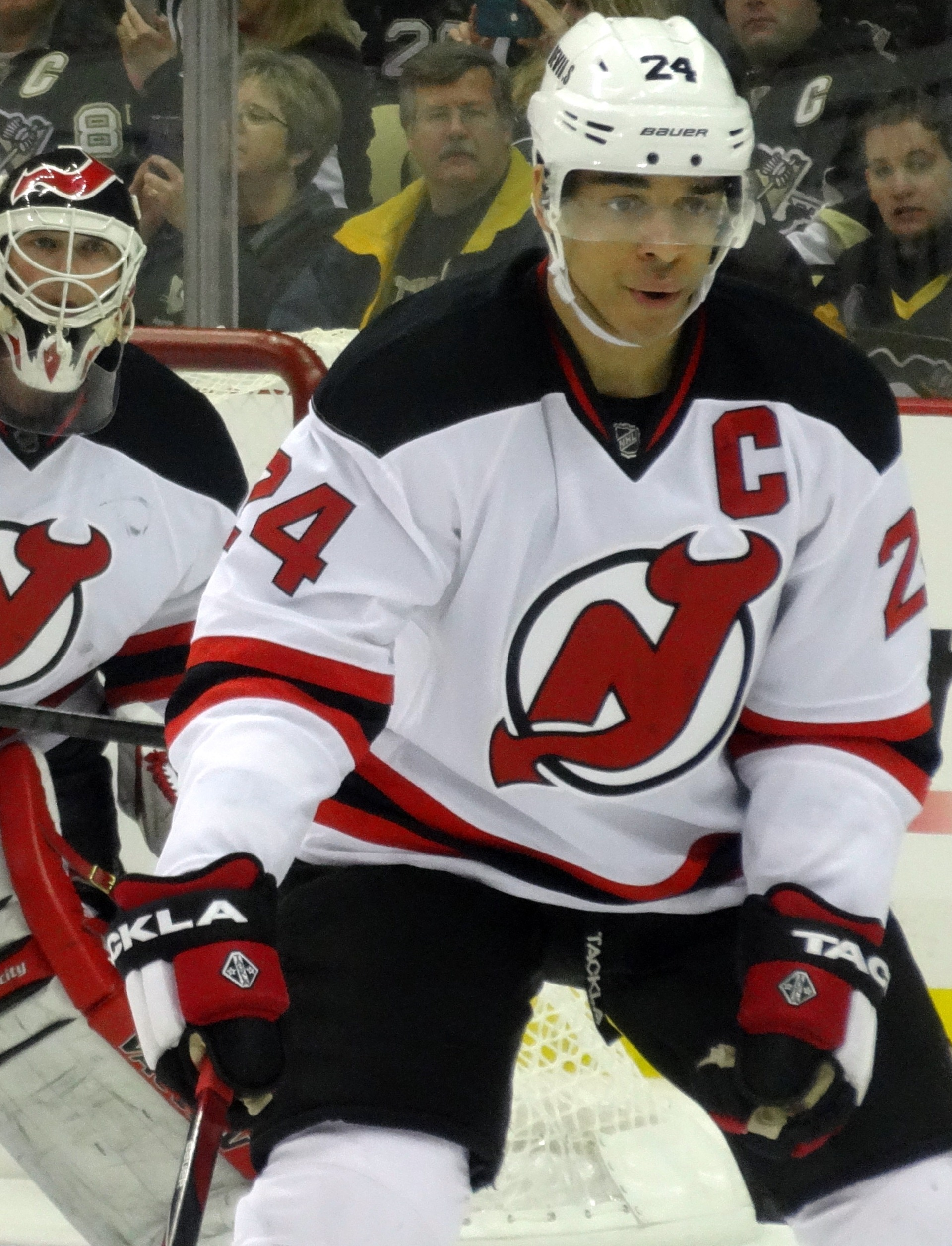
Bryce Salvador was named as the Devils' captain in January 2013.

The Devils entered the lockout-shortened season with Bryce Salvador as their new captain. The Devils, however, failed to repeat the performance of the year past, finishing 19–19–10 in 48 games, missing the playoffs. Injuries to Brodeur and Kovalchuk only made their season tougher, with the Devils losing ten games in a row at their lowest point. Goaltenders Johan Hedberg and Keith Kinkaid, a rookie, were used when Brodeur was injured, though neither of them performed strong enough to help the Devils put anything positive and lasting together.

During the subsequent off-season, the Devils acquired goaltender Cory Schneider from the Vancouver Canucks in exchange for New Jersey's ninth overall draft pick in 2013. Lou Lamoriello stated that Brodeur would still remain the starter, but that Schneider would get significant ice time. David Clarkson was lost in free agency to Toronto and Henrik Tallinder via a trade to Buffalo, but Lamoriello brought in Jaromir Jagr, Ryane Clowe and Michael Ryder from the Bruins, Rangers and Canadiens, respectively. Matt Shaw was replaced by Mike Foligno as power play coach, while Patrik Elias re-signed on a three-year, $16.5 million contract. Weeks later, however, Kovalchuk shocked the Devils and NHL community after announcing his retirement from the League and his intention to return to Russia to play for SKA Saint Petersburg in the Kontinental Hockey League (KHL).

=== 2013–present: the Harris–Blitzer era ===
The Devils' long-time financial struggles worsened during the 2013 season, and at one point the team was forced to borrow $30 million to meet their payroll. This prompted owner Jeff Vanderbeek to sell the team. The team was sold to American investors Josh Harris and David Blitzer for over $320 million. The sale was formally announced on August 15, 2013.

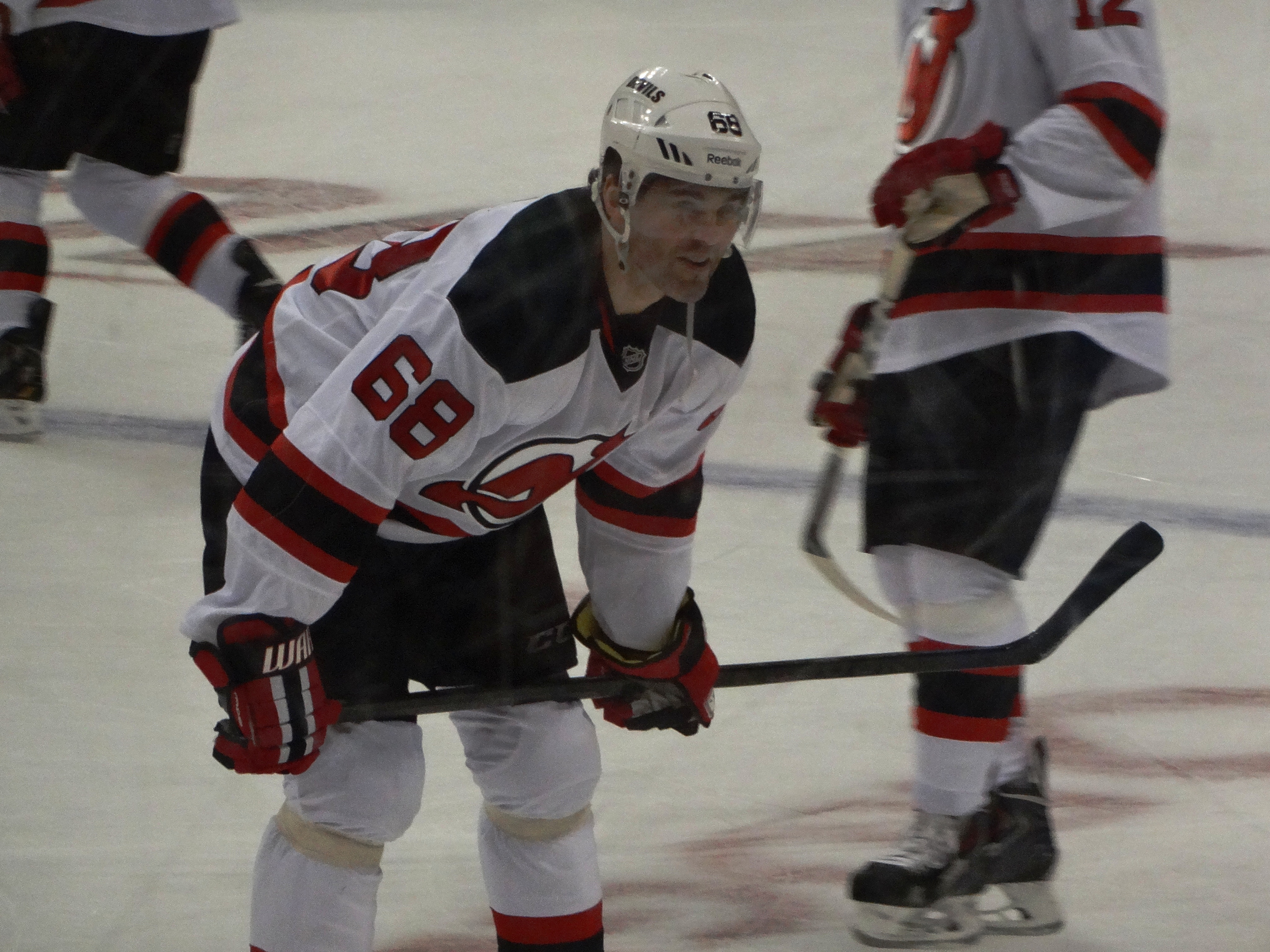
Jaromir Jagr during the 2013–14 season. Jagr led the Devils in scoring during that season.

During the 2013–14 season, the Devils missed the playoffs by five points, marking the only time they did not qualify for the postseason twice in a row under Lamoriello. Among the team's problems were inconsistent goaltending, an overreliance on aged players—Jaromir Jagr led the team scoring at the age of 41—and a failure to win any of the 13 shootouts the team played in. The Devils played their first outdoor game on January 26, 2014, against the New York Rangers as part of the 2014 NHL Stadium Series, a game they ultimately lost 7–3. The game was played at Yankee Stadium with almost 50,000 spectators in attendance. Later that year, on March 6, the NHL announced that it had decided to partially reverse the penalties previously imposed against the Devils for the signing of Ilya Kovalchuk in 2010, whose contract was ruled to have circumvented the NHL's salary cap. The penalties, which stipulated that the Devils had to forfeit a third-round draft pick in 2011, a first-round pick in one of the next four drafts and pay a $3 million fine, was reduced to a $1.5 million fine and saw the Devils receive their first-round pick back, which they used to select John Quenneville 30th overall in 2014.

The 2014–15 season opened with injuries and plenty of personnel losses to the Devils. On December 26, head coach Peter DeBoer was fired from his position and was replaced former Devils captain Scott Stevens—who had been DeBoer's assistant for two years—and Adam Oates, with Lamoriello himself supervising the team during the first few months of the coaching changes. After having only one victory in their last eleven games, the Devils finished seventh in the Metropolitan Division and 20 points away from a playoff spot with a 32–36–14 record; the 2014–15 season game the team its worst record since the 1988–89 season. Lamoriello gave up his general manager role after the season, and resigned from the team in July 2015 to accept the general manager position with the Toronto Maple Leafs (who fired Dave Nonis); former Pittsburgh Penguins general manager Ray Shero was hired to replace Lamoriello in that role.

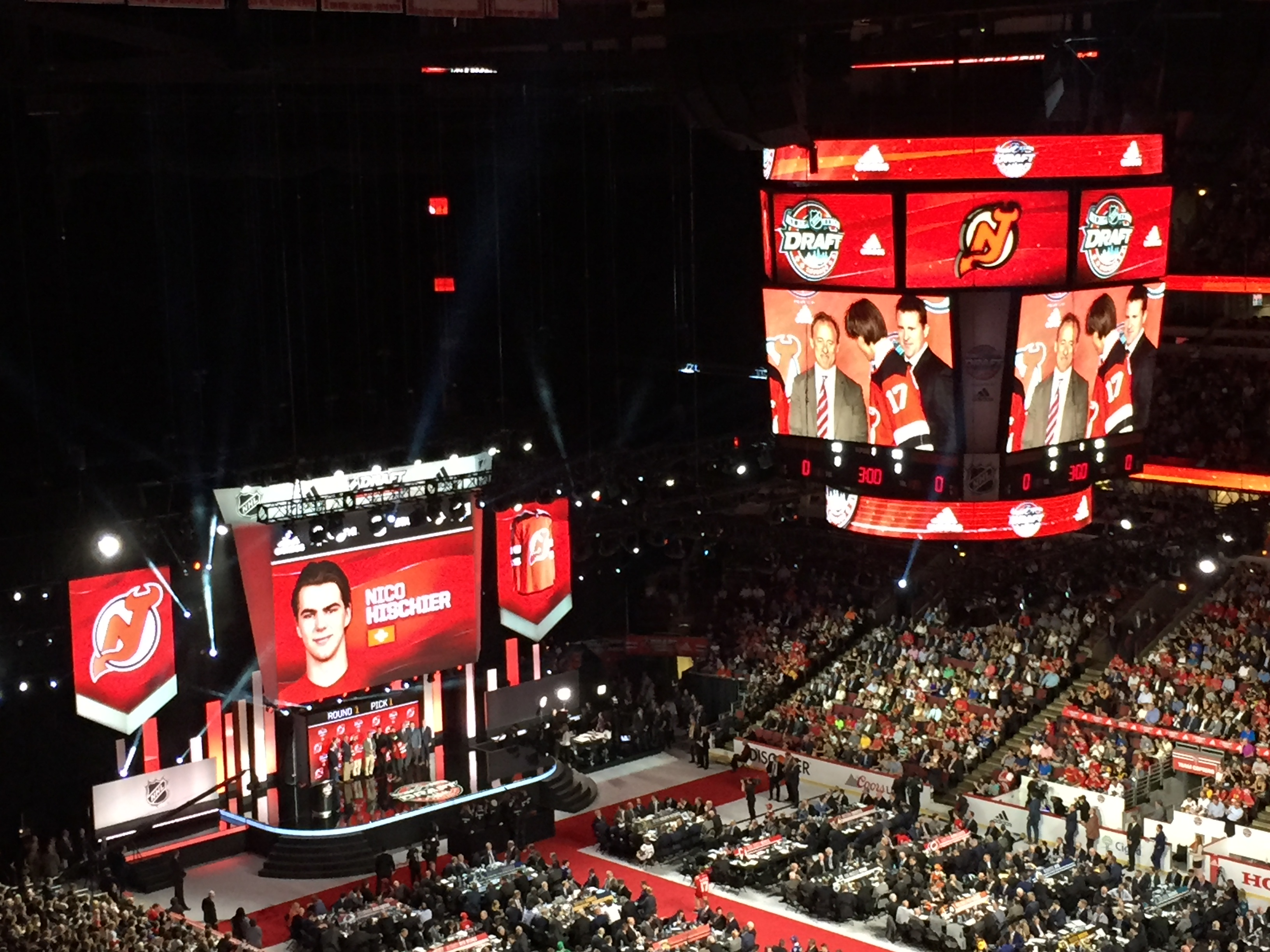
The Devils drafted Nico Hischier with the first overall selection at the 2017 NHL entry draft.

The Devils hired head coach John Hynes from the Wilkes-Barre/Scranton Penguins; he began his tenure as Devils head coach in the 2015–16 season. In the 2015–16 season, the Devils finished seventh in the Metropolitan Division with 84 points, missing the playoffs for the fourth consecutive season. The team finished in last place in the Eastern Conference the following season with 70 points; this was the first time that they finished last in the conference since the 1985–86 season. However, they won the ensuing draft lottery to secure the first overall selection in the 2017 NHL entry draft, which they used to select Halifax Mooseheads center Nico Hischier.

In the 2017–18 season, the team recorded its best start in franchise history, going 9–2–0 in their first 11 games of the season. Forward Taylor Hall set the franchise record for points in consecutive games, recording a point in 26 straight appearances. Hall finished the season sixth in the NHL in points (93) and earned nominations for the Hart Memorial Trophy for the league's most valuable player and the Ted Lindsay Award for the NHL's most outstanding player. On the back of Hall's impressive performance and with aid from goaltender Keith Kinkaid and rookie Hischier, the Devils clinched a playoff spot for the first time since the 2011–12 season with a win over the Toronto Maple Leafs. The Devils' playoff run ended in the First Round where they lost 4–1 to the Tampa Bay Lightning in a seven-game series. After the conclusion of the playoffs, Hall became the first player in franchise history to win the Hart Memorial Trophy.

The Devils failed to return to the playoffs in the 2018–19 season as they struggled. Plagued by injuries, including reigning MVP Taylor Hall being sidelined with a knee injury for nearly 50 games, the Devils finished 15th in the Eastern Conference with 72 points. In the subsequent draft lottery, the team received the first overall selection in the 2019 NHL entry draft for the second time in three years. The Devils used this pick to select Jack Hughes first overall.

In the 2019 off-season, the Devils acquired P. K. Subban, Nikita Gusev, and Wayne Simmonds. The Devils started the 2019–20 season with a six-game losing streak, going 0–4–2, and after having a 9–13–4 record in December, head coach John Hynes was fired and replaced by interim head coach Alain Nasreddine. However, the Devils kept struggling and Taylor Hall was traded to the Arizona Coyotes, longtime captain Andy Greene was traded to the New York Islanders, and Wayne Simmonds was traded to the Buffalo Sabres. Ray Shero was fired as the general manager on January 12, 2020, and replaced by interim general manager Tom Fitzgerald. On March 12, the regular season was suspended due to the COVID-19 pandemic. Then, on May 26, the regular season was declared finished and the Devils missed the playoffs for the second year in a row. On July 9, Lindy Ruff was named the Devils' head coach. After a good start with great play from goaltender Mackenzie Blackwood and center Jack Hughes, the Devils would get an outbreak of COVID-19, which sidelined the team for two weeks. Once they returned, they struggled, and longest-tenured Devil Travis Zajac was traded with veteran goal-scorer Kyle Palmieri to the New York Islanders. The Devils would go on to miss the playoffs for the third consecutive season.

During the 2021 off-season, the Devils signed defenseman Dougie Hamilton. General manager Tom Fitzgerald would also succeed in his goal to sign a backup goaltender and top 6 winger by signing veterans Jonathan Bernier and Tomas Tatar. However, the 2021–22 season fared to be no better as the Devils once again missed the playoffs. At the end of the season, Mark Recchi and Alain Nasreddine were fired from their assistant coach positions.

In the 2022–23 season, the team rebounded by recording its best regular season in franchise history. Spurred on by a franchise-record 13-game winning streak in October and November, the Devils finished third in the entire league and set a franchise record for wins (52) and points (112). The team's climb from 63 points the prior season to 112 points marked the largest single-season increase by any NHL team in an 82-game season. In addition to a breakout season from newly acquired goaltender Vitek Vanecek, the Devils were led by impressive offensive performances from Hughes, Hischier, Hamilton, and Jesper Bratt. All four players eclipsed the 70-point mark, while Hughes set a franchise record for most points in a single season by a Devils player with 99 points. Devils general manager Tom Fitzgerald built further on this impressive offensive core by acquiring All-Star forward Timo Meier in a mid-season trade from the San Jose Sharks. In the First Round of the 2023 Stanley Cup playoffs, the Devils faced their rivals across the river, the New York Rangers. After falling behind 2–0 in the series with two home losses, the Devils rebounded to win the series in seven games. After advancing to the Second Round for the first time since 2012, the Devils were defeated by the Carolina Hurricanes in five games.

== See also ==
- History of the National Hockey League
- List of New Jersey Devils seasons
- List of Stanley Cup champions

== Sources ==
- Grigsby, Bill (2004). Grigs!: A Beauuutiful Life. Sports Publishing LLC. ISBN 9781582617176.
- Jenish, D'Arcy (2015). The NHL: 100 Years of On-Ice Action & Boardroom Battles. Doubleday Canada. ISBN 9780385671484.
- Laroche, Stephen (2014). Changing the Game: A History of NHL Expansion. ECW Press. ISBN 9781770905788.
- Maguire, Liam (2012). Next Goal Wins!: The Ultimate NHL Historian's One-of-a-Kind Collection of Hockey Trivia. Random House of Canada. ISBN 9780307363411.
- Wise, Aaron N.; Meyer, Bruce S. (1997). International Sports Law and Business, Volume 1. Kluwer Law International. ISBN 9789041109774.
