= List of Colorado Rockies head coaches =

This is a list of head coaches that have coached the Kansas City Scouts and the Colorado Rockies of the NHL. This list does not include the head coaches of the New Jersey Devils.

Head coaches of the Kansas City Scouts:

- Bep Guidolin 1974–75
- Bep Guidolin, Sid Abel and Eddie Bush 1975–76

Head Coaches of the Colorado Rockies:

- Johnny Wilson 1976–77
- Pat Kelly 1977–78
- Pat Kelly and Aldo Guidolin 1978–79
- Don Cherry 1979–80
- Bill MacMillan 1980–81
- Bert Marshall and Marshall Johnston 1981–82

== See also ==
- List of New Jersey Devils head coaches
- List of NHL head coaches
