= Aldo Guidolin =

Canadian ice hockey player and coach

- Born: June 6, 1932 Forks of the Credit, Ontario
- Died: November 8, 2015 (aged 83) Guelph, Ontario
- Height: 6 ft 0 in (183 cm)
- Weight: 180 lb (82 kg; 12 st 12 lb)
- Position: Right wing/Defence
- Shot: Right
- Played for: New York Rangers
- Playing career: 1952–1969

Aldo Reno Guidolin (June 6, 1932 – November 8, 2015) was a Canadian professional ice hockey defenceman and coach. He played in the National Hockey League with the New York Rangers between 1952 and 1956. The rest of his career, which lasted from 1952 to 1969, was mainly spent in the American Hockey League. After his playing career, Guidolin became a coach, and was the head coach of the NHL's Colorado Rockies during the 1978–79 season.

== Playing career ==
Guidolin began his career with the junior league Guelph Biltmores. He won the Memorial Cup in 1952 while still playing in a role as a two-way winger. After a partial minor league season with the Valleyfield Braves, Guidolin was called up to the New York Rangers and moved permanently to defence. He played 182 games in the National Hockey League with the club, serving as a regular at the blue line for two seasons before being relegated to the American Hockey League.

Guidolin played for the next fourteen seasons with Springfield Indians, Cleveland Barons and Baltimore Clippers, serving as a bruising defender with an offensive flare.

== Post-playing career ==
In his final three seasons with the Clippers, Guidolin also worked as the coach of the team, before taking an NHL job as a scout with the Atlanta Flames. He later became the Colorado Rockies director of player development and served a partial season behind the team's bench as interim head coach.

== Personal life ==
Guidolin experienced a series of strokes after retirement. In his later life, he lived at an assisted living facility in Guelph, Ontario. He died on November 8, 2015.

He is the first cousin of fellow NHL player and coach Bep Guidolin, who was the first coach of the Kansas City Scouts when they joined the NHL in 1974. The Scouts moved from Kansas City to Denver after two seasons to become the Rockies.

== Career statistics ==
=== Regular season and playoffs ===
			Regular season					Playoffs
Season	Team	League	GP	G	A	Pts	PIM	GP	G	A	Pts	PIM
1949–50	Guelph Biltmores	OHA	38	8	8	16	21	15	2	0	2	18
1949–50	Guelph Biltmores	M-Cup	—	—	—	—	—	11	0	3	3	8
1950–51	Guelph Biltmores	OHA	38	7	11	18	35	5	0	1	1	0
1951–52	Guelph Biltmores	OHA	47	21	33	54	95	10	2	4	6	16
1951–52	Guelph Biltmores	M-Cup	—	—	—	—	—	4	2	1	3	2
1952–53	New York Rangers	NHL	30	4	4	8	24	—	—	—	—	—
1952–53	Vancouver Canucks	WHL	3	2	0	2	4	—	—	—	—	—
1952–53	Valleyfield Braves	QSHL	24	3	5	8	29	11	0	3	3	9
1953–54	New York Rangers	NHL	68	2	6	8	51	—	—	—	—	—
1954–55	New York Rangers	NHL	70	2	5	7	34	—	—	—	—	—
1955–56	New York Rangers	NHL	14	1	0	1	8	—	—	—	—	—
1955–56	Providence Reds	AHL	51	5	26	31	111	8	4	3	7	11
1956–57	Providence Reds	AHL	34	8	16	24	28	5	1	1	2	6
1957–58	Providence Reds	AHL	59	6	16	22	64	5	1	2	3	12
1958–59	Springfield Indians	AHL	55	3	18	21	90	—	—	—	—	—
1959–60	Cleveland Barons	AHL	66	10	22	32	168	7	0	2	2	16
1960–61	Cleveland Barons	AHL	72	10	37	47	152	4	0	1	1	8
1961–62	Cleveland Barons	AHL	68	7	34	41	177	6	1	2	3	10
1962–63	Baltimore Clippers	AHL	59	8	28	36	144	—	—	—	—	—
1963–64	Baltimore Clippers	AHL	72	7	17	24	165	—	—	—	—	—
1964–65	Baltimore Clippers	AHL	67	1	28	29	143	—	—	—	—	—
1965–66	Providence Reds	AHL	71	4	21	25	157	—	—	—	—	—
1966–67	Baltimore Clippers	AHL	64	3	14	17	108	9	0	1	1	20
1967–68	Baltimore Clippers	AHL	69	6	12	18	95	—	—	—	—	—
1968–69	Baltimore Clippers	AHL	72	0	8	8	60	—	—	—	—	—
AHL totals			879	78	297	375	1662	44	7	12	19	83
NHL totals			182	9	15	24	117	—	—	—	—	—

=== Coaching record ===
Team	Year	Regular season						Post season
Team	Year	G	W	L	T	Pts	Finish	Result
Colorado Rockies	1978–79	59	12	39	8	32	4th in Smythe	Missed playoffs

Preceded by Pat Kelly	Head coach of the Colorado Rockies; 1978–79	Succeeded by Don Cherry
