= Doug Carpenter =

Canadian ice hockey player and coach

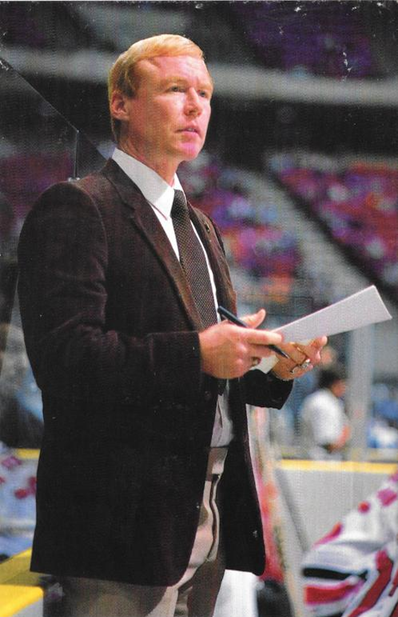
- Born: July 1, 1942 (age 84) Cornwall, Ontario, Canada
- Height: 5 ft 10 in (178 cm)
- Weight: 190 lb (86 kg; 13 st 8 lb)
- Coached for: New Jersey Devils; Toronto Maple Leafs
- Coaching career: 1974–1993

Doug Carpenter (born July 1, 1942, in Cornwall, Ontario) is a Canadian former head coach in the National Hockey League (NHL), the Quebec Major Junior Hockey League, the International Hockey League (IHL) and the American Hockey League (AHL), and is a former hockey player in the Eastern Hockey League and the IHL.

As a player from 1964–1974, he played for the Greensboro Generals and Roanoke Valley Rebels in the EHL and for the Flint Generals in the IHL. He became a head coach for the Flint Generals in 1974, where he coached until 1978. He then became head coach of the Cornwall Royals of the QMJHL for the 1979-80 season. Following stints with the New Brunswick Hawks and St. Catharines Saints of the AHL, he landed his first NHL head coach position with the New Jersey Devils. Later he coached the Toronto Maple Leafs. Also, in the AHL he coached the Halifax Citadels twice, and the New Haven Nighthawks. He ended his coaching career in 1993.

Carpenter consulted in the programming of the game Wayne Gretzky Hockey 2.

== Coaching record ==
Team	Year	Regular season							Postseason			
Team	Year	G	W	L	T	OTL	Pts	Finish	W	L	Win %	Result
NJD	1984–85	80	22	48	10	-	54	5th in Patrick	—	—	—	Missed playoffs
NJD	1985–86	80	28	49	3	-	59	6th in Patrick	—	—	—	Missed playoffs
NJD	1986–87	80	29	45	6	-	64	6th in Patrick	—	—	—	Missed playoffs
NJD	1987–88	50	21	24	5	-	47	(fired)	—	—	—	Missed playoffs
TOR	1989–90	80	38	38	4	-	80	3rd in Norris	1	4	.200	Lost in division semifinals (STL)
TOR	1990–91	11	1	9	1	-	3	(fired)	—	—	—	Missed playoffs
NJD Total		290	100	166	24	-	224		—	—	—	—
TOR Total		91	39	47	5	-	83		1	4	.200	
Total		381	139	213	29	-	307		1	4	.200	

Preceded by George Armstrong	Head coach of the Toronto Maple Leafs; 1989–91	Succeeded by Tom Watt
Preceded by Tom McVie	Head coach of the New Jersey Devils; 1984–88	Succeeded by Jim Schoenfeld
