= Larry Robinson =

Canadian ice hockey player and coach (born 1951)

- Hockey Hall of Fame, 1995
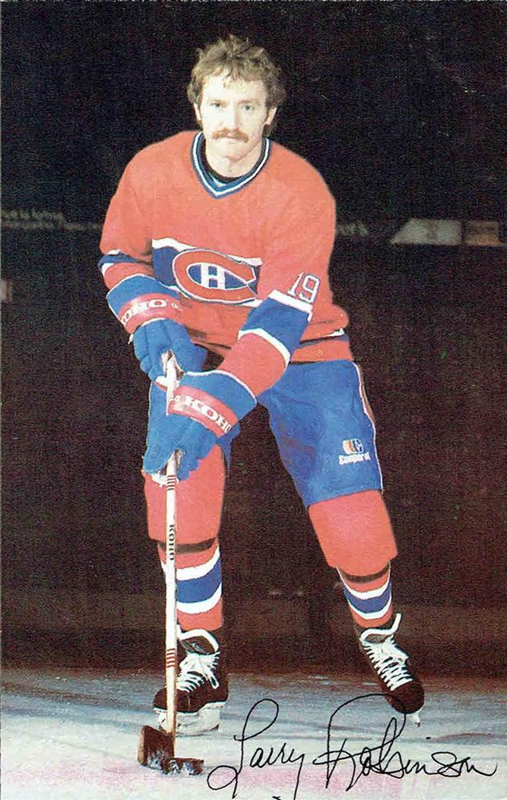
- Robinson with the Montreal Canadiens in 1984
- Born: June 2, 1951 (age 75) Winchester, Ontario, Canada
- Height: 6 ft 4 in (193 cm)
- Weight: 225 lb (102 kg; 16 st 1 lb)
- Position: Defence
- Shot: Left
- Played for: Montreal Canadiens; Los Angeles Kings
- Coached for: Los Angeles Kings; New Jersey Devils
- National team: Canada
- NHL draft: 20th overall, 1971; Montreal Canadiens
- Playing career: 1973–1992
- Coaching career: 1995–2005

Larry Clark Robinson (born June 2, 1951) is a Canadian former ice hockey coach, executive and player. His coaching career includes head coaching positions with the New Jersey Devils (which he held on two occasions), as well as the Los Angeles Kings. For his play in the National Hockey League (NHL) with the Montreal Canadiens and Los Angeles Kings, Robinson was inducted into the Hockey Hall of Fame in 1995. He was also inducted into the Ontario Sports Hall of Fame in 2014. In 2017, Robinson was named one of the "100 Greatest NHL Players". Larry is the brother of Moe Robinson.

== Playing career ==
Larry Robinson played Junior 'A' hockey with the Brockville Braves of the CJHL and Major Junior in the Ontario Hockey League with the Kitchener Rangers then turned professional, spending 1971 to 1973 with the Nova Scotia Voyageurs of the American Hockey League before making it to the National Hockey League with the Montreal Canadiens.

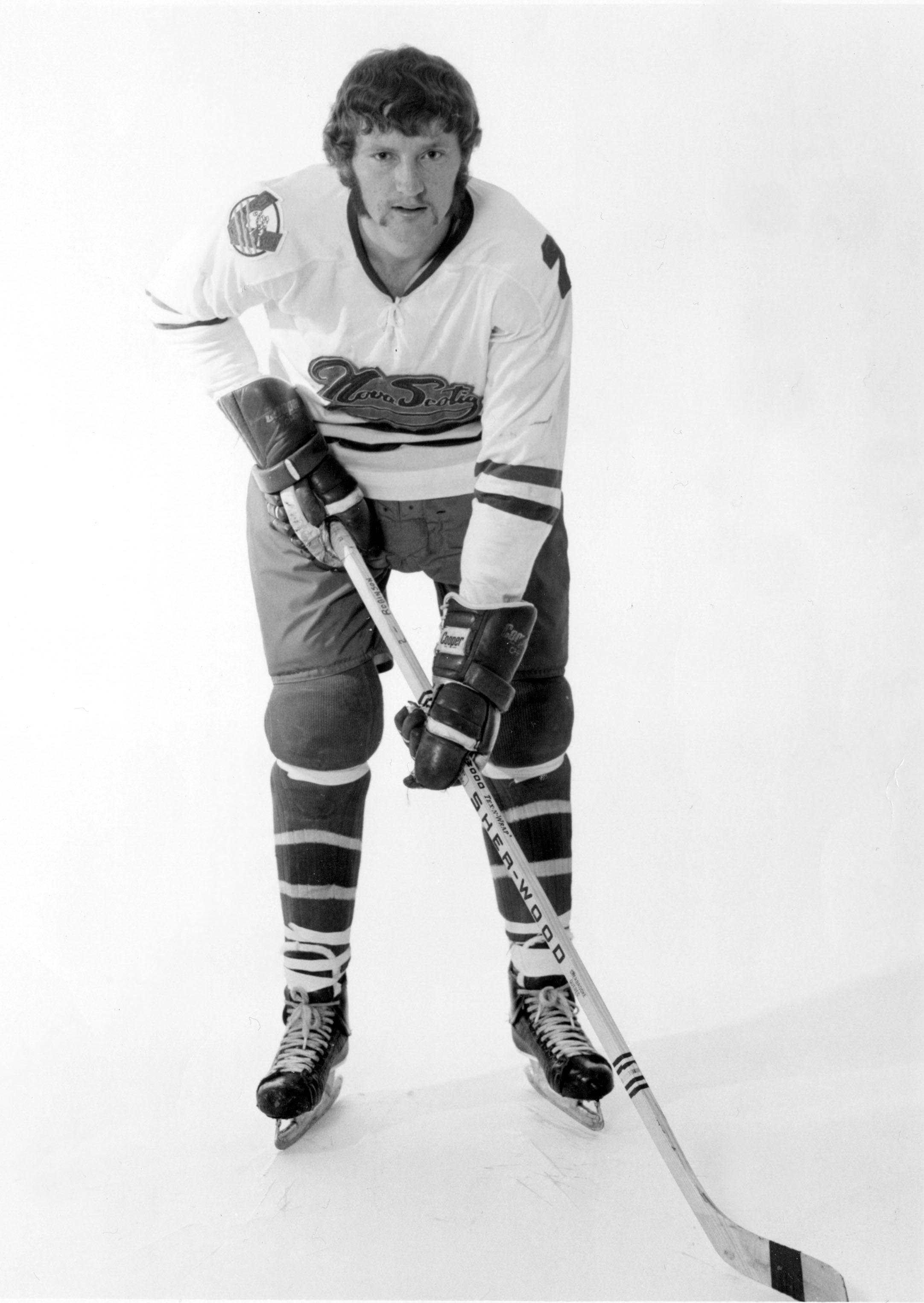
Robinson with the Nova Scotia Voyageurs c. 1972

Nicknamed "Big Bird" in part for his size (6'4’’ and 225 pounds), Robinson was a big and strong yet highly mobile defenceman. He played 17 seasons for the Montreal Canadiens and another three seasons for the Los Angeles Kings, until his retirement after the 1991–92 season. He won the James Norris Memorial Trophy twice (1976–77 and 1979–80) as the league's most outstanding defenceman and won the Conn Smythe Trophy as the most valuable player of the 1978 playoffs. He was named to the league's first and second all-star teams three times each. His peak years were 1976–77 to 1980–81, although he had a strong comeback season at age 34 in 1985–86 when he was again named to the second all-star team and scored 82 points, just three shy of his career high of 85 (1976–77). Robinson was a dominant player whose talent and leadership helped lead the Canadiens to six Stanley Cups.

Robinson was a member of Team Canada in the 1976, 1981 and 1984 Canada Cup tournaments and was an international All-Star team selection in the 1981 IIHF World Championships. During his career, he played in ten of the league's All-Star games and ended his 20-year career having scored 208 goals, 750 assists for 958 regular-season points as well as 144 points in 227 playoff game;, a remarkable achievement for a defenceman. He holds an impressive career plus-minus rating of +730, the NHL career record, including an overwhelming +120 in 1976–77 (second only to Bobby Orr's record +124 in 1970–71, and with Orr and Wayne Gretzky (+100 1984–85), is one of only three players to have a plus-minus rating of +100 or greater for a season). He won the Stanley Cup six times with the Canadiens, in 1973, 1976, 1977, 1978, 1979, and 1986. Together with Nicklas Lidstrom, Robinson holds the NHL record for most consecutive playoff seasons with 20, 17 of them with the Canadiens.

Robinson has been honoured for his playing career. In 1995, he was inducted into the Hockey Hall of Fame. In 1998, he was ranked number 24 on The Hockey News' list of the 100 Greatest Hockey Players. In 2000, he was inducted into the Ottawa Sports Hall of Fame. On November 19, 2007, the Canadiens retired Robinson's No. 19 jersey before a loss against the Ottawa Senators. Larry Robinson's name appears on the Stanley Cup ten times, six as a player, three as a coach or assistant coach and once as a scout.

== Coaching career ==
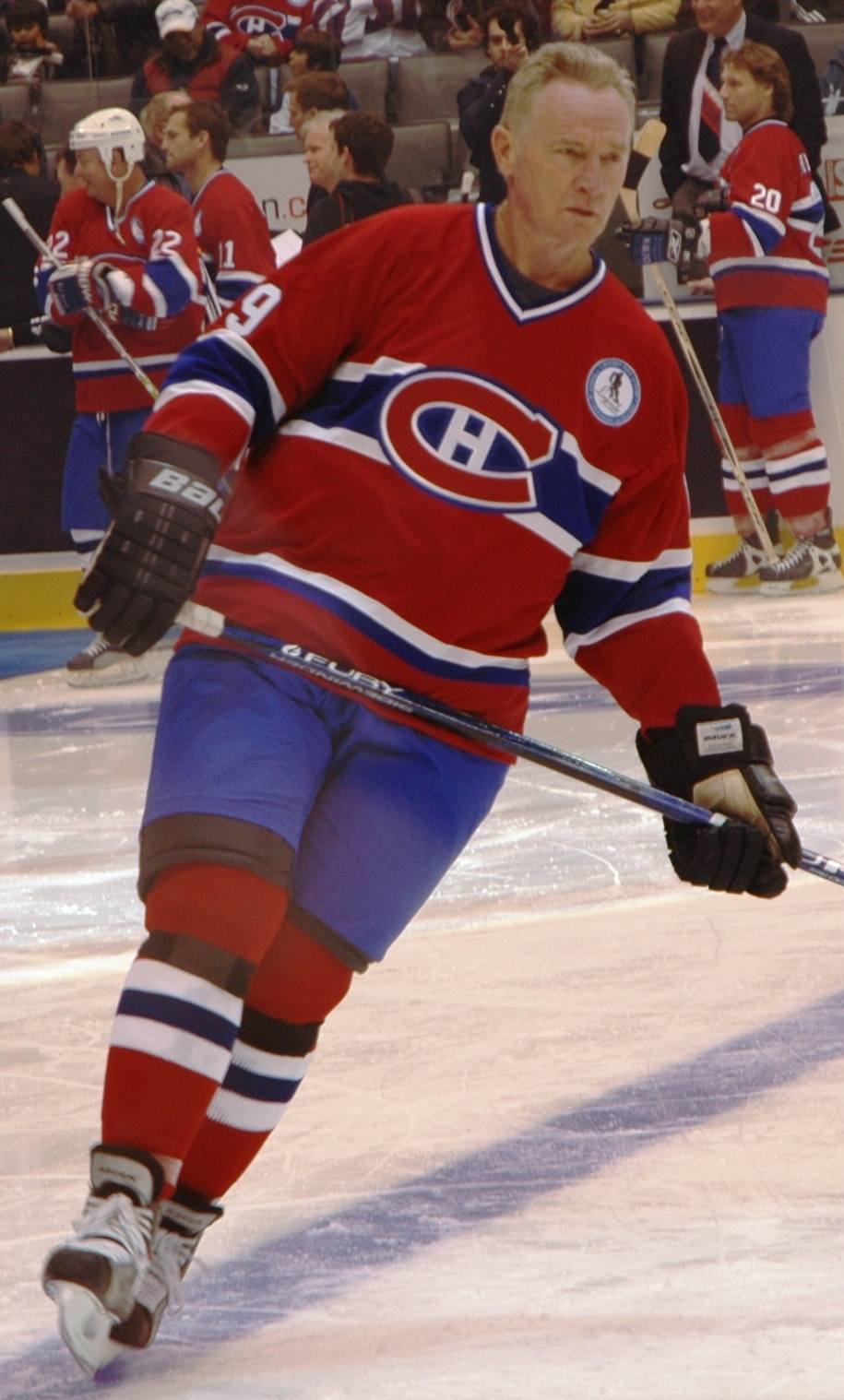
Robinson in 2008

Following his retirement, Robinson was hired as an assistant coach with the New Jersey Devils in 1993. After winning the Stanley Cup in 1995 with the Devils, he was hired as head coach of the Los Angeles Kings, the same year he was inducted into the Hockey Hall of Fame. He left the Los Angeles team at the end of the 1998–99 season and signed on as an assistant coach with the New Jersey Devils once again. Named interim head coach of the New Jersey Devils on March 23, 2000, Robinson guided his team to win the 2000 Stanley Cup. With the victory, Robinson became the first interim head coach in NHL history to guide a team to the Stanley Cup. The feat would later be accomplished by Craig Berube in 2019. Robinson recounted to journalist Scott Morrison:

Considering how long I played hockey and how many Cups I got to win as a defenseman with Montreal, it was my first Stanley Cup win as a head coach that is actually my greatest day in hockey.

He stayed on as head coach for the next year and again guided the Devils to the 2001 Stanley Cup Final, where they lost against the Colorado Avalanche in seven games.

Robinson was fired during the 2001–02 season, but returned as an assistant coach in February 2002 and just before the 2002–03 season to win his ninth Stanley Cup in 2003.

When Pat Burns suffered a recurrence of cancer, Robinson again assumed the mantle of head coach on July 14, 2005. This stint came to an end on December 19, 2005, when Robinson resigned, citing stress and other health problems.

Robinson returned to the Devils prior to the 2007–08 season as an assistant coach under Brent Sutter. Prior to the 2008–09 season, Robinson left from behind the Devils' bench to become a special assignment coach between the organization's prospects in Lowell, Mass., and the Devils.

Robinson's contract ended with the New Jersey Devils in the summer of 2012. He indicated he was interested in becoming an assistant coach with the Montreal Canadiens, however that post was filled with former Hab J.J. Daigneault soon after. Robinson then was appointed an associate coach with the San Jose Sharks on July 10, 2012. On May 23, 2014, the Sharks added director of player development to Robinson's role. In 2017, at the end of his five-year contract with the Sharks, Robinson left the organization. He is currently a Senior Consultant to Hockey Operations for the St. Louis Blues.

With the St. Louis Blues defeating the Boston Bruins in the 2019 Stanley Cup Final, Robinson won his tenth Stanley Cup championship.

== Polo and horse racing ==
Robinson was raised on a Marvelville, Ontario farm and as a boy, he grew up with a love of horses. While living in the rural area of Saint-Lazare, Quebec west of Montreal, Robinson became a co-founder with former teammate Steve Shutt, Michael Sinclair-Smith and local veterinarian Dr. Gilbert Hallé of the Montreal Polo Club at Sainte-Marthe, Quebec.

While playing in Los Angeles, Robinson became involved in the sport of thoroughbred horse racing through a partnership with Kings owner Bruce McNall's Summa Stable. Among their racing successes, Down Again won the 1990 Monrovia Handicap at Santa Anita Park.

== Other honours ==
In June 1993, the ice rink in the Metcalfe Community Centre in Metcalfe, Ontario was renamed the Larry Robinson Arena. Metcalfe is located near the settlement of Marvelville, where Robinson grew up. Robinson had also played hockey for the Metcalfe junior hockey team in the 1967-68 season, at which time it was part of the St. Lawrence Junior "B" Hockey League.

Also in June 1993, the former Osgoode Township (now part of the City of Ottawa) declared June 5 to be "Larry Robinson Day." However, seven years later, Osgoode Township declared August 12 to be "Larry Robinson Day."

In the second round of the 2026 Stanley Cup playoffs, Robinson was the ceremonial torch bearer at the Bell Centre for game six of the Eastern Conference Semifinals.

== Career statistics ==
=== Regular season and playoffs ===
			Regular season					Playoffs
Season	Team	League	GP	G	A	Pts	PIM	GP	G	A	Pts	PIM
1969–70	Brockville Braves	CJHL	40	22	29	51	74	—	—	—	—	—
1969–70	Ottawa M&W Rangers	CJHL	—	—	—	—	—	5	2	1	3	2
1970–71	Kitchener Rangers	OHA-Jr.	61	12	39	51	65	4	1	2	3	5
1971–72	Nova Scotia Voyageurs	AHL	74	10	14	24	54	15	2	10	12	31
1972–73	Nova Scotia Voyageurs	AHL	38	6	33	39	33	—	—	—	—	—
1972–73	Montreal Canadiens	NHL	36	2	4	6	20	11	1	4	5	9
1973–74	Montreal Canadiens	NHL	78	6	20	26	66	6	0	1	1	26
1974–75	Montreal Canadiens	NHL	80	14	47	61	76	11	0	4	4	27
1975–76	Montreal Canadiens	NHL	80	10	30	40	59	13	3	3	6	10
1976–77	Montreal Canadiens	NHL	77	19	66	85	45	14	2	10	12	12
1977–78	Montreal Canadiens	NHL	80	13	52	65	39	15	4	17	21	6
1978–79	Montreal Canadiens	NHL	67	16	45	61	33	16	6	9	15	8
1979–80	Montreal Canadiens	NHL	72	14	61	75	39	10	0	4	4	2
1980–81	Montreal Canadiens	NHL	65	12	38	50	37	3	0	1	1	2
1981–82	Montreal Canadiens	NHL	71	12	47	59	41	5	0	1	1	8
1982–83	Montreal Canadiens	NHL	71	14	49	63	33	3	0	0	0	2
1983–84	Montreal Canadiens	NHL	74	9	34	43	39	15	0	5	5	22
1984–85	Montreal Canadiens	NHL	76	13	34	47	44	12	3	8	11	8
1985–86	Montreal Canadiens	NHL	78	19	63	82	39	20	0	13	13	22
1986–87	Montreal Canadiens	NHL	70	13	37	50	44	17	3	17	20	6
1987–88	Montreal Canadiens	NHL	53	6	34	40	30	11	1	4	5	4
1988–89	Montreal Canadiens	NHL	74	4	26	30	22	21	2	8	10	12
1989–90	Los Angeles Kings	NHL	64	7	32	39	34	10	2	3	5	10
1990–91	Los Angeles Kings	NHL	62	1	22	23	16	12	1	4	5	15
1991–92	Los Angeles Kings	NHL	56	3	10	13	37	2	0	0	0	0
NHL totals			1,384	207	751	958	793	227	28	116	144	211

=== International ===
Year	Team	Event	GP	G	A	Pts	PIM
1976	Canada	CC	7	0	0	0	0
1979	NHL All-Stars	Exhib.	3	1	0	1	0
1981	Canada	WC	6	1	1	2	2
1981	Canada	CC	7	1	0	1	2
1984	Canada	CC	8	1	2	3	2
Senior totals			31	4	3	7	6

=== Coaching career statistics ===
Team	Year	Regular season							Postseason			
Team	Year	G	W	L	T	OTL	Pts	Finish	W	L	Win %	Result
LA	1995–96	82	24	40	18	—	66	6th in Pacific	—	—	—	Missed playoffs
LA	1996–97	82	28	43	11	—	67	6th in Pacific	—	—	—	Missed playoffs
LA	1997–98	82	38	33	11	—	87	2nd in Pacific	0	4	.000	Lost in Conference Quarterfinals (STL)
LA	1998–99	82	32	45	5	—	69	5th in Pacific	—	—	—	Missed playoffs
LA total		328	122	161	45	—	.441		0	4	.000	1 playoff appearance
NJ	1999–2000	8	4	4	0	0	(103)	2nd in Atlantic	16	7	.696	Won Stanley Cup (DAL)
NJ	2000–01	82	48	19	12	3	111	1st in Atlantic	15	10	.600	Lost in Stanley Cup Final (COL)
NJ	2001–02	51	21	20	7	3	(95)	(fired)	—	—	—	—
NJ	2005–06	32	14	13	0	5	(101)	(resigned)	—	—	—	—
NJ total		173	87	56	19	11	.590		31	17	.646	2 playoff appearances 1 Stanley Cup
Total		501	209	217	64	11	.492		31	21	.596	3 playoff appearances 1 Stanley Cup

== See also ==
- Notable families in the NHL

Preceded by Guy Lafleur	Winner of the Conn Smythe Trophy; 1978	Succeeded by Bob Gainey
Preceded by Denis Potvin	Winner of the Norris Trophy; 1980	Succeeded by Randy Carlyle
Preceded by Denis Potvin	Winner of the Norris Trophy; 1977	Succeeded by Denis Potvin
Preceded by Rogatien Vachon	Head coach of the Los Angeles Kings; 1995–99	Succeeded by Andy Murray
Preceded by Robbie Ftorek	Head coach of the New Jersey Devils; 2000–02	Succeeded by Kevin Constantine
Preceded by Pat Burns	Head coach of the New Jersey Devils; 2005	Succeeded by Lou Lamoriello
