= Tom McVie =

Canadian ice hockey coach (1935–2025)

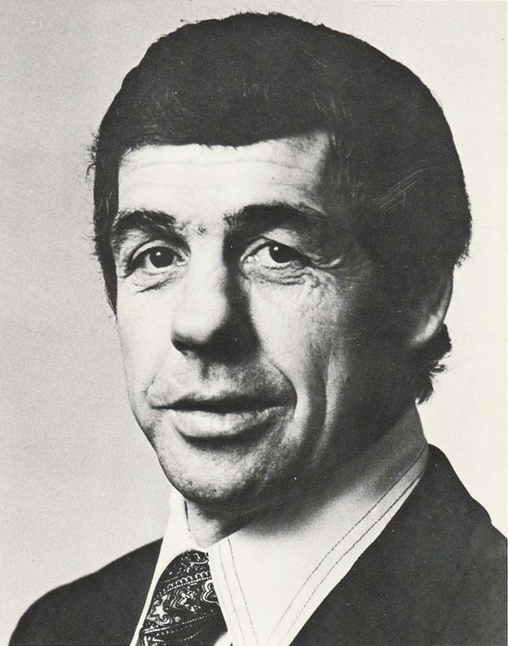
- McVie in 1977
- Born: June 6, 1935; Trail, British Columbia, Canada
- Died: January 19, 2025 (aged 89); Vancouver, Washington, U.S.
- Occupations: Ice hockey coach, player
Ice hockey career
- Height: 5 ft 9 in (175 cm)
- Weight: 162 lb (73 kg; 11 st 8 lb)
- Position: Left wing
- Shot: Left
- Played for: Toledo Mercurys; Seattle Americans/Totems; Portland Buckaroos; Los Angeles Blades; Phoenix Roadrunners; Fort Wayne Komets; Johnstown Jets; Dayton Gems
- Coached for: Washington Capitals; Winnipeg Jets; New Jersey Devils
- Playing career: 1956–1974
- Coaching career: 1972–1998

Thomas McVie (June 6, 1935 – January 19, 2025) was a Canadian professional ice hockey coach in the National Hockey League (NHL).

== Biography ==
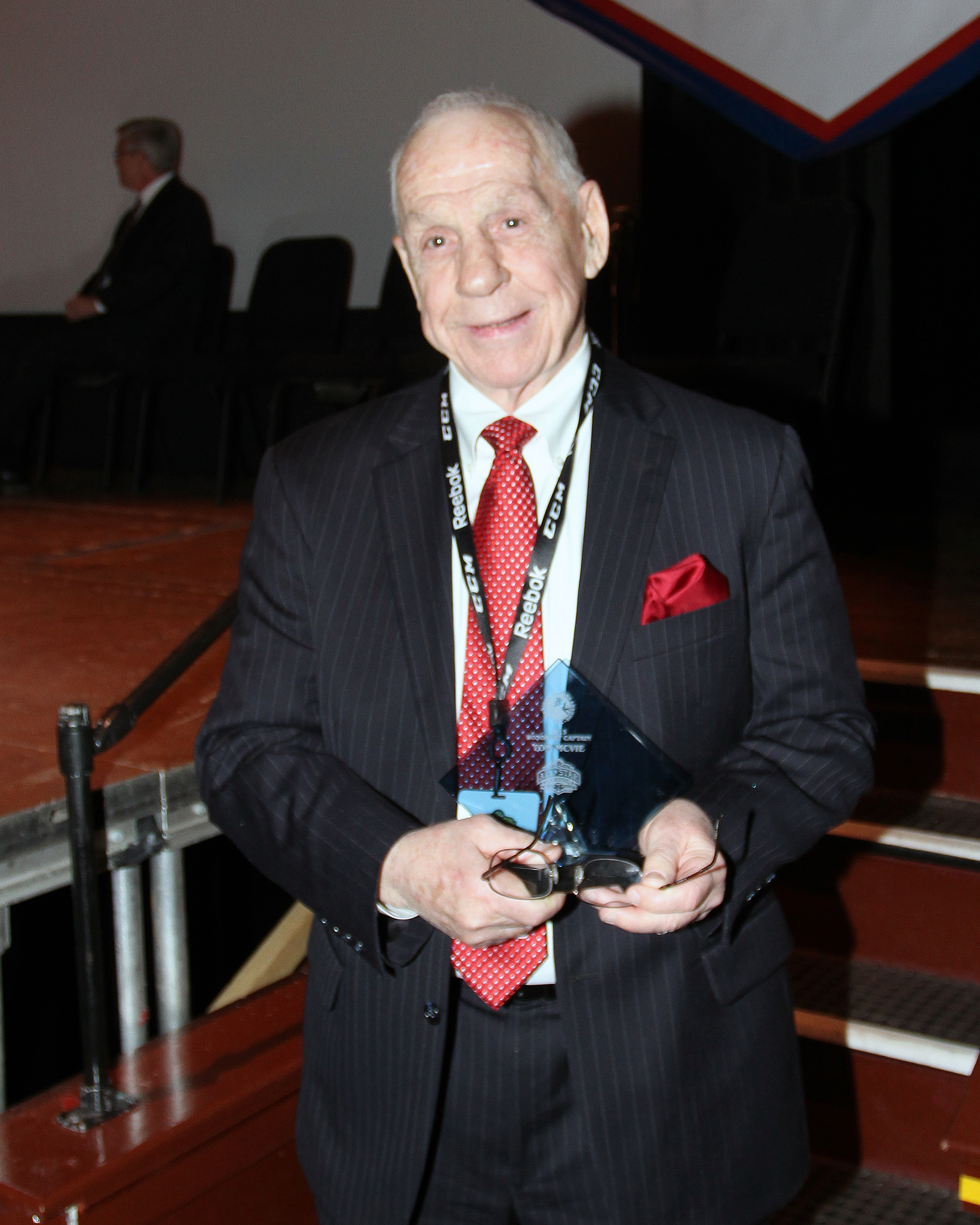
McVie in 2013

McVie grew up in a poor family and, upon signing his first junior league contract, is said to have left home with a single used stick and pair of skates. After his junior career ended, McVie signed with the Seattle Totems of the Western Hockey League and began a long career with this league that included stops with the Portland Buckaroos, Los Angeles Blades, and Phoenix Roadrunners. He scored a career-high 85 points during the 1961–62 season, earning a tryout with the New York Rangers but failing to secure a training camp invitation.

After three years behind the bench in the International Hockey League, McVie coached the Washington Capitals from the 1975–76 season to the middle of the 1978–79 season. After being released by the Capitals, he moved to the Winnipeg Jets, then in the World Hockey Association, and coached the team to an Avco Cup championship. He then coached with Bill Sutherland in the Jets' first two NHL seasons, 1979–80 and 1980–81. He replaced Bill MacMillan as head coach of the New Jersey Devils midway through the 1983–84 season, in which the team posted the worst record in its history. McVie returned as an NHL head coach with the Devils in 1991–92 after coaching the AHL Utica Devils.

McVie served in the Boston Bruins organization for 21 years, 16 of them as a scout, and later as "brand ambassador." He finally had his name etched on the Stanley Cup in 2011, as the Bruins won their first championship in 39 years.

McVie died at his home in Vancouver, Washington on January 19, 2025, at the age of 89.

== NHL/WHA coaching record ==
Team	Year	Regular season						Postseason			
Team	Year	G	W	L	OTL	Pts	Finish	W	L	Win%	Result
WSH	1975–76	44	8	31	5	(32)	5th in Norris	—	—	—	—
WSH	1976–77	80	24	42	14	62	4th in Norris	—	—	—	—
WSH	1977–78	80	17	49	14	48	5th in Norris	—	—	—	—
WIN	1978–79	19	11	8	0	(84)	3rd in WHA	8	2	.800	Won Avco Cup Championship (EDM)
WIN	1979–80	77	19	47	11	(49)	(fired)	—	—	—	—
WIN	1980–81	28	1	20	7	(32)	6th in Smythe	—	—	—	—
NJD	1983–84	60	15	38	7	(41)	5th in Patrick	—	—	—	—
NJD	1990–91	13	4	5	4	(79)	4th in Patrick	3	4	.429	Lost in First Round (PIT)
NJD	1991–92	80	38	31	11	87	4th in Patrick	3	4	.429	Lost in First Round (NYR)
NHL totals		462	126	263	73			6	8	.429	2 playoff appearances
WHA totals		19	11	8	0			8	2	.800	1 playoff appearances 1 Avco World Trophy
Total		481	137	271	73			14	10	.583	3 playoff appearances Avco World Trophy

Preceded by Milt Schmidt	Head coach of the Washington Capitals; 1975–78	Succeeded by Danny Belisle
Preceded by Larry Hillman; Bill Sutherland	Head coach of the Winnipeg Jets; 1979–80; 1980	Succeeded by Bill Sutherland
Preceded by Bill MacMillan; John Cunniff	Head coach of the New Jersey Devils; 1983–84; 1991–92	Succeeded by Doug Carpenter; Herb Brooks
Preceded by Bob Francis	Head coach of the Providence Bruins; 1997–98	Succeeded by Peter Laviolette
