= Billy MacMillan =

Canadian hockey coach and player (1943–2023)

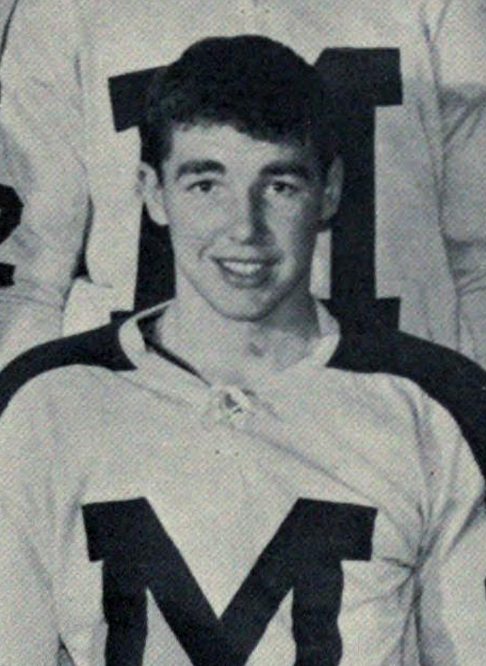
- MacMillan with the St. Michaels Majors, c. 1961
- Born: March 7, 1943 Charlottetown, Prince Edward Island, Canada
- Died: July 14, 2023 (aged 80) Charlottetown, Prince Edward Island, Canada
- Height: 5 ft 10 in (178 cm)
- Weight: 185 lb (84 kg; 13 st 3 lb)
- Position: Right wing
- Shot: Left
- Played for: Toronto Maple Leafs; Atlanta Flames; New York Islanders
- National team: Canada
- Playing career: 1966–1978
Medal record
Men's ice hockey
Olympic Games
| Bronze medal – third place | 1968 Grenoble |
World Championships
| Bronze medal – third place | 1966 Yugoslavia |
| Bronze medal – third place | 1967 Austria |

William Stewart MacMillan (March 7, 1943 – July 14, 2023) was a Canadian hockey coach and player. MacMillan played and later coached in the National Hockey League (NHL). After several years with the Canada national team, including playing at two World Championships and the 1968 Winter Olympics, winning a bronze medal, MacMillan made his NHL debut in 1970 with the Toronto Maple Leafs. He played for Toronto, the Atlanta Flames, and New York Islanders between 1970 and 1977, and retired from playing in 1978. He became a coach during his final year, spent in the minor CHL and moved to the NHL in 1979 when he became an assistant coach for the Islanders. He was named the head coach of the Colorado Rockies in 1980, also serving as general manager the next season. MacMillan stayed with the team as they relocated in 1982 to become the New Jersey Devils, and was let go early in the 1983–84 season. Billy is the brother of Bob MacMillan.

== Early career ==
MacMillan was born on March 7, 1943, in Charlottetown, Prince Edward Island (PEI), where he grew up and excelled at a variety of sports, including hockey, rugby, and track. He left home as a teenager for the more fertile hockey ground of Ontario. He appeared in three Memorial Cup tournaments with the powerful St. Michael's Majors junior team. He later played university hockey at Saint Dunstan's University (which later became the University of Prince Edward Island through a merger in 1969), after returning to Prince Edward Island to complete his academic studies. He subsequently appeared in various minor leagues.

He spent most of the years from 1965 to 1970 playing for the Canadian national team. With the national team MacMillan played in several Ice Hockey World Championships, winning the bronze medal in 1966 and 1967, and at the 1968 Winter Olympics, also winning a bronze.

== NHL career ==
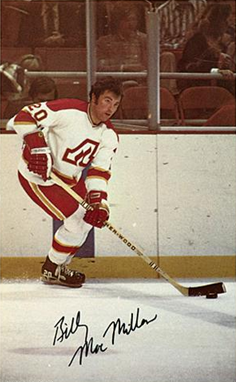
Billy MacMillan of the Atlanta Flames in 1972

A powerful body checker and solid defensive forward, MacMillan made his NHL debut on October 11, 1970, with the Toronto Maple Leafs, aged 27, becoming only the fifth player from Prince Edward Island to make an NHL roster. He scored a surprising 22 goals as a rookie with the Maple Leafs, but saw his playing time reduced the next season. He was selected in the 1972 expansion draft by the Atlanta Flames, playing in a checking role with the team during its inaugural season. He was then traded to the New York Islanders, where he played for an additional four years. After failing to make the NHL roster in 1977, he played one year with the Fort Worth Texans before retiring.

== Coaching career ==
As a player-coach, MacMillan led the Fort Worth Texans to the Central Hockey League (CHL) championship, garnering the Jake Milford Trophy, the league's Coach of the Year award, for the 1977–78 season; he moved into full-time coaching afterwards. After one more season in the CHL, he was promoted to become an assistant coach by Al Arbour with the New York Islanders, the Texans' parent club in the NHL, for the 1979–80 season, and he helped lead this franchise to its first Stanley Cup championship.

The following season, he was hired by the Colorado Rockies to serve a dual role as general manager and head coach. After one season, he was relieved of his coaching duties, but after the team moved and became the New Jersey Devils in 1982, he returned to a capacity behind the bench. He was fired 20 games into the following season. He then returned home in Prince Edward Island and coached the UPEI Panthers for many years; in 1991, he guided the team to a conference title and a berth in the CIAU University Cup Final Four.

== Accolades ==
In 1985, MacMillan was inducted into the PEI Sports Hall of Fame. In 2017, he was again enshrined in the PEI Sports Hall of Fame as a member of the 1964–65 Saint Dunstan's Saints, which he led as the MVP that season.

== Death ==
MacMillan died on July 14, 2023, at the age of 80 in Charlottetown.

== Career statistics ==
=== Regular season and playoffs ===
| | | | Regular season | | | | | Playoffs |
| Season | Team | League | GP | G | A | Pts | PIM | GP | G | A | Pts | PIM |
|---|---|---|---|---|---|---|---|---|---|---|---|---|
| 1959–60 | St. Michael's Buzzers | OHA-B | — | — | — | — | — | — | — | — | — | — |
| 1959–60 | St. Michael's Majors | OHA | 2 | 0 | 0 | 0 | 0 | 5 | 0 | 1 | 1 | 0 |
| 1960–61 | St. Michael's Majors | OHA | 46 | 7 | 12 | 19 | 31 | 7 | 1 | 1 | 2 | 4 |
| 1960–61 | St. Michael's Majors | M-Cup | — | — | — | — | — | 4 | 2 | 1 | 3 | 0 |
| 1961–62 | St. Michael's Majors | OHA | 32 | 14 | 15 | 29 | 0 | 9 | 12 | 2 | 14 | 41 |
| 1961–62 | St. Michael's Majors | M-Cup | — | — | — | — | — | 5 | 1 | 0 | 1 | 7 |
| 1962–63 | Sudbury Wolves | EPHL | 1 | 0 | 0 | 0 | 0 | — | — | — | — | — |
| 1962–63 | Toronto Neil McNeil Maroons | MTJHL | 32 | 25 | 12 | 37 | 11 | 10 | 9 | 11 | 20 | 9 |
| 1962–63 | Toronto Neil McNeil Maroons | M-Cup | — | — | — | — | — | 6 | 1 | 4 | 5 | 18 |
| 1963–64 | St. Dunstan's University | MIAU | 11 | 25 | 11 | 36 | 17 | — | — | — | — | — |
| 1964–65 | St. Dunstan's University | AUAA | 20 | 25 | — | 25 | 12 | — | — | — | — | — |
| 1965–66 | Canada National Team | Intl | — | — | — | — | — | — | — | — | — | — |
| 1966–67 | Canada National Team | Intl | — | — | — | — | — | — | — | — | — | — |
| 1967–68 | Ottawa Nationals | OHA Sr | 20 | 13 | 8 | 21 | 20 | — | — | — | — | — |
| 1967–68 | Canada National Team | Intl | — | — | — | — | — | — | — | — | — | — |
| 1968–69 | Canada National Team | Intl | — | — | — | — | — | — | — | — | — | — |
| 1969–70 | Tulsa Oilers | CHL | 3 | 1 | 6 | 7 | 0 | — | — | — | — | — |
| 1969–70 | Canada National Team | Intl | — | — | — | — | — | — | — | — | — | — |
| 1970–71 | Toronto Maple Leafs | NHL | 76 | 22 | 19 | 41 | 42 | 6 | 0 | 3 | 3 | 2 |
| 1971–72 | Toronto Maple Leafs | NHL | 61 | 10 | 7 | 17 | 39 | 5 | 0 | 0 | 0 | 0 |
| 1972–73 | Atlanta Flames | NHL | 78 | 10 | 15 | 25 | 52 | — | — | — | — | — |
| 1973–74 | New York Islanders | NHL | 55 | 4 | 9 | 13 | 16 | — | — | — | — | — |
| 1974–75 | New York Islanders | NHL | 69 | 13 | 12 | 25 | 12 | 17 | 0 | 1 | 1 | 23 |
| 1975–76 | New York Islanders | NHL | 64 | 9 | 7 | 16 | 10 | 13 | 4 | 2 | 6 | 8 |
| 1976–77 | Fort Worth Texans | CHL | 12 | 1 | 7 | 8 | 2 | — | — | — | — | — |
| 1976–77 | Rhode Island Reds | AHL | 2 | 1 | 1 | 2 | 4 | — | — | — | — | — |
| 1976–77 | New York Islanders | NHL | 43 | 6 | 8 | 14 | 13 | 12 | 2 | 0 | 2 | 7 |
| 1977–78 | Fort Worth Texans | CHL | 59 | 5 | 13 | 18 | 26 | 14 | 2 | 2 | 4 | 2 |
| NHL totals | | | 446 | 74 | 77 | 151 | 184 | 53 | 6 | 6 | 12 | 40 |

== Coaching record ==
| Team | Year | Regular season | | | | | | Post season |
| Team | Year | G | W | L | T | Pts | Finish | Result |
|---|---|---|---|---|---|---|---|---|
| Fort Worth Texans | 1977–78 | 76 | 44 | 29 | 3 | 91 | 1st | Won Championship |
| Fort Worth Texans | 1978–79 | 76 | 33 | 39 | 4 | 70 | 4th | Lost in round 1 |
| Colorado Rockies | 1980–81 | 80 | 22 | 45 | 13 | 57 | 5th in Smythe | Missed playoffs |
| New Jersey Devils | 1982–83 | 80 | 17 | 49 | 14 | 48 | 5th in Patrick | Missed playoffs |
| New Jersey Devils | 1983–84 | 20 | 2 | 18 | 0 | 4 | 5th in Patrick | (fired in reg. season) |
| Total | | 180 | 41 | 112 | 27 | | | |

| Preceded by Don Cherry | Head coach of the Colorado Rockies; 1980–81 | Succeeded by Bert Marshall |
| Preceded by Colorado Rockies coaches Marshall Johnston | Head coach of the New Jersey Devils; 1982–83 | Succeeded by Tom McVie |
| Preceded by Ray Miron | General manager of the Colorado Rockies/New Jersey Devils; 1981–83 | Succeeded by Max McNab |
