= List of New Jersey Devils head coaches =

This is a list of New Jersey Devils head coaches. The Devils had 20 different head coaches since the team moved to New Jersey in the 1982–83, with Jacques Lemaire serving as coach three times and Tom McVie, Larry Robinson, and Lou Lamoriello each serving twice.

Three coaches have led the team to a victory in the Stanley Cup Final: Lemaire in 1995, Robinson in 2000, and Pat Burns in 2003. Lemaire is the all-time leader in games coached and wins, while Burns leads in winning percentage (with at least one full season coached).

Several former players have worked for the Devils as assistant coaches, including John MacLean and Bobby Carpenter, the only men whose names are inscribed on the Stanley Cup as both a player and a coach with New Jersey. MacLean later served as head coach and is the only former Devils' player to serve in that capacity.

On December 26, 2014, after the firing of DeBoer, head coaching responsibilities were split between Adam Oates and Scott Stevens for the remainder of the 2014–15 season, with Lamoriello supervising the team from the bench.

== Key ==
#	Number of coaches
GC	Games coached
W	Wins
L	Losses
T	Ties (no longer applicable after the 2005–06 season)
OTL	Overtime losses (includes shootout losses after 2005–06)
Pts	Points
Win%	Winning percentage
§	Name is engraved on the Stanley Cup

== Coaches ==
Note: This list does not include data from the Kansas City Scouts and the Colorado Rockies. Statistics are correct through the 2025–26 season.

#	Name	Dates	Regular season							Playoffs			Achievements	Ref
#	Name	Dates	GC	W	L	T	OTL	Pts	Win%	GC	W	L	Achievements	Ref
1	Bill MacMillan	June 30, 1982 – November 22, 1983	100	19	67	14	—	52	.260	—	—	—		
2	Tom McVie	November 22, 1983 – May 31, 1984	60	15	38	7	—	37	.308	—	—	—		
3	Doug Carpenter	May 31, 1984 – January 26, 1988	290	100	166	24	—	224	.386	—	—	—		
4	Jim Schoenfeld	January 26, 1988 – November 6, 1989	124	50	59	15	—	115	.464	20	11	9		
5	John Cunniff	November 6, 1989 – March 4, 1991	133	59	56	18	—	136	.511	6	2	4		
—	Tom McVie	March 4, 1991 – June 5, 1992	93	42	36	15	—	99	.532	14	6	8		
6	Herb Brooks	June 5, 1992 – May 31, 1993	84	40	37	7	—	87	.518	5	1	4		
7	Jacques Lemaire§	June 28, 1993 – May 8, 1998	378	199	122	57	—	455	.602	56	34	22	Stanley Cup champions (1995); Jack Adams Award (1994)	
8	Robbie Ftorek	May 21, 1998 – March 23, 2000	156	88	44	19	5	200	.625	7	3	4		
9	Larry Robinson§	March 23, 2000 – January 28, 2002	141	73	43	19	6	171	.606	48	31	17	Stanley Cup champions (2000)	
10	Kevin Constantine	January 28, 2002 – June 13, 2002	31	20	8	2	1	43	.677	6	2	4		
11	Pat Burns§	June 13, 2002 – July 14, 2005	164	89	45	22	8	208	.634	29	17	12	Stanley Cup champions (2003)	
—	Larry Robinson	July 14, 2005 – December 19, 2005	32	14	13	—	5	33	.516	—	—	—		
12	Lou Lamoriello	December 19, 2005 – May 14, 2006	50	32	14	—	4	68	.680	9	5	4		
13	Claude Julien	June 13, 2006 – April 2, 2007	79	47	24	—	8	102	.646	—	—	—		
—	Lou Lamoriello	April 2, 2007 – July 12, 2007	3	2	0	—	1	5	.833	11	5	6		
14	Brent Sutter	July 12, 2007 – June 10, 2009	164	97	56	—	11	205	.625	12	4	8		
—	Jacques Lemaire	July 13, 2009 – April 26, 2010	82	48	27	—	7	103	.628	5	1	4		
15	John Maclean	June 17, 2010 – December 23, 2010	33	9	22	—	2	20	.303	—	—	—		
—	Jacques Lemaire	December 23, 2010 – April 10, 2011	49	29	17	—	3	61	.622	—	—	—		
16	Peter DeBoer	July 19, 2011 – December 26, 2014	212	102	76	—	34	238	.561	24	14	10		
17	Adam Oates; Scott Stevens	December 27, 2014 – June 2, 2015	46	20	17	—	7	47	.511	—	—	—		
18	John Hynes	June 2, 2015 – December 3, 2019	354	150	159	—	45	345	.487	5	1	4		
19	Alain Nasreddine	December 3, 2019 – July 9, 2020	43	19	16	—	8	46	.535	—	—	—		
20	Lindy Ruff	July 9, 2020 – March 4, 2024	281	128	125	—	28	284	.505	12	5	7		
21	Travis Green	March 4, 2024 – May 7, 2024	21	8	12	—	1	17	.405	—	—	—		
22	Sheldon Keefe	May 23, 2024–present	164	84	70	—	10	178	.543	5	1	4		

== Notes ==
1. The win–loss percentage is calculated using the formula: $\frac{Wins+\frac{1}{2}Ties}{Games}$
2. Since the Devils officially finalized their move from Colorado to New Jersey on June 30, 1982, that is the date that their reign as coach and assistant coach began on the Devils.
3. Schoenfeld was suspended for one game during the 1988 Stanley Cup playoffs for verbally abusing referee Don Koharski; general manager Lou Lamoriello filled in as coach for the Devils' 7–1 loss to Boston.
4. Although Ftorek was replaced during the 1999–2000 season, he got his name on the Cup when the Devils won it later that same season.
5. Robinson was demoted to assistant coach and replaced as head coach in the middle of the 2001–02 season, but the Devils placed his name on the Cup when they won the following season even though he had left before the 2002–03 season even began.
6. Pat Burns resigned after being diagnosed with cancer.
7. Larry Robinson resigned due to stress-related health problems.
8. Claude Julien was fired with just 3 games left in the 2006–07 regular season.
9. Brent Sutter quit after two years of a three-year contract, citing a desire to be closer to home in Alberta, with his family and minor league hockey team, the Red Deer Rebels. Several weeks later, Sutter was announced as the head coach of the Calgary Flames. Despite the fact that Calgary had to request permission to talk to Sutter, the Devils received no compensation.
