= Pat Burns =

Canadian ice hockey coach (1952-2010)

- Hockey Hall of Fame, 2014 (Builder)
- Burns in Montreal, c. 1989
- Born: April 4, 1952 Montreal, Quebec, Canada
- Died: November 19, 2010 (aged 58) Sherbrooke, Quebec, Canada
- Coached for: Montreal Canadiens; Toronto Maple Leafs; Boston Bruins; New Jersey Devils

Patrick John Joseph Burns (April 4, 1952 – November 19, 2010) was a National Hockey League (NHL) head coach. Over 14 seasons between 1988 and 2004, he coached in 1,019 games with the Montreal Canadiens, Toronto Maple Leafs, Boston Bruins, and New Jersey Devils, and he won the Stanley Cup in 2003 with the Devils. Burns retired in 2005 after being diagnosed with recurring cancer, which eventually claimed his life five years later. Burns won the Jack Adams Award three times, which is the most by a coach in NHL history. In fourteen seasons (twelve full), he reached the postseason eleven times.

In 2014, he was posthumously inducted into the Hockey Hall of Fame.

== Professional career ==
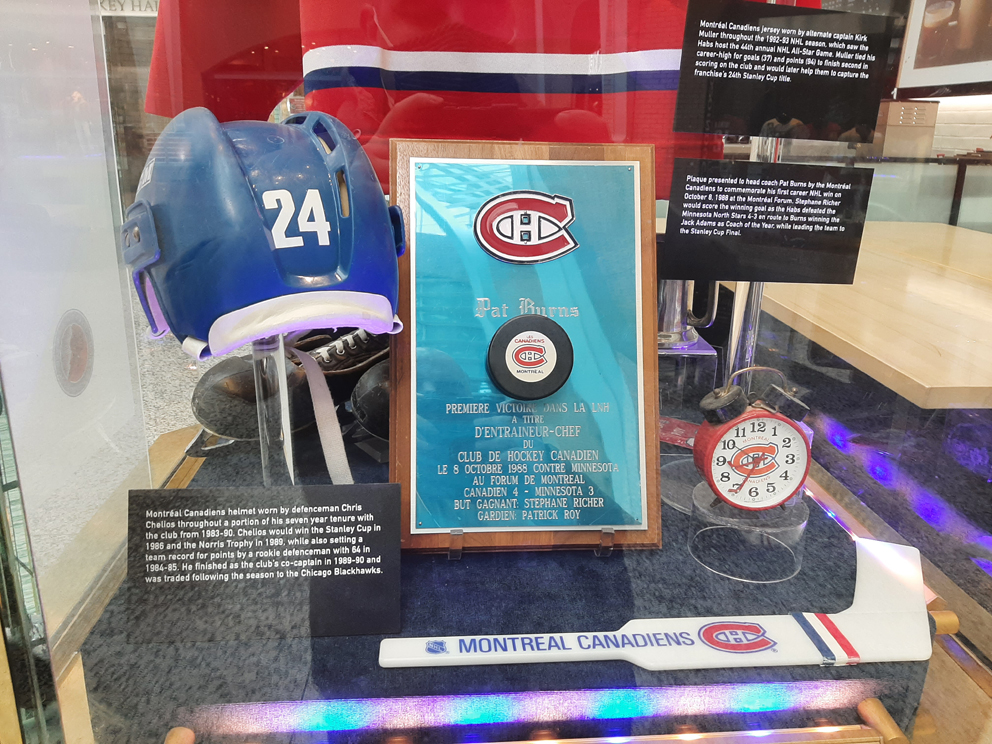
A plaque (now in the Hockey Hall of Fame) presented to Burns by the Canadiens to commemorate his first career NHL win

As a child, Burns had always wanted to play on an NHL team, and win the Stanley Cup. Realizing he didn't possess the skill set to make it professionally, Burns became a police officer. He had also worked part-time as a scout for the Hull Olympiques of the QMJHL. He became an assistant coach with Hull in 1984, and worked his way through the ranks, becoming the team's head coach after owner Wayne Gretzky and general manager Charles Henry decided he'd be the best fit. During his time with the Olympiques, he coached future Hockey Hall of Fame member Luc Robitaille. He served as an assistant coach to the Canada men's national junior ice hockey team at the 1987 World Junior Ice Hockey Championships, which infamously ended with a brawl now known as the "Punch-up in Piestany". Before the start of the 1987–88 NHL season, Montreal Canadiens general manager Serge Savard offered Burns the head coach position for the Sherbrooke Canadiens of the American Hockey League. Burns held the position for one year before being promoted to head coach of Montreal.

In Burns first year as an NHL coach, the Canadiens finished the 1988–89 NHL season with a division-winning 53-18-9, ultimately losing the Stanley Cup finals in six games to the Calgary Flames. Burns won the Jack Adams Award for coach of the year, his first of three wins. A defensive-minded coach, Burns would lead Montreal to the second round of the playoffs in every year as head coach, before making a shocking resignation at the end of the 1992 season where they were swept by the Boston Bruins, citing his frustration with the media.

Following his departure from Montreal, Burns was hired as head coach of the Toronto Maple Leafs. He had also received an offer from the Los Angeles Kings, but he cited the Leafs' history as a factor in his decision, and added "I find myself fortunate to coach two of the greatest franchises in NHL history." He led Toronto in their best playoff run since 1967, making it to the conference finals, losing in seven games to the Kings. At the NHL Awards, Burns won his second Jack Adams trophy. He followed that performance with another trip to the conference finals in 1994, losing in five to the Vancouver Canucks. The Leafs again made the playoffs in 1995, but following a disappointing losing streak during the 1996 season, Burns was let go in March 1996. Burns had been making $850,000 to coach the Maple Leafs, one of the highest salaries for a coach in the NHL.

Burns took a year off from hockey before being hired to coach the Boston Bruins in 1997. He won the Jack Adams at the end of the season, making him the only coach in history to win the award three separate times. All three of his wins came in his introductory season with the team. The Bruins continued to have success until the 1999-2000 season, when they missed the playoffs, the first time in Burns's career where his team missed the playoffs. Burns was fired eight games into the 2000-01 season, following a disappointing 3-4-1 record.

Described as a stern coach who expected the best from his players, Burns was once quoted as stating, "I’m not an overly happy person. There are times when I’m happy, and that’s usually in my private life. I don’t think anybody here wants to be my friend.” Burns finished his head coaching career with the New Jersey Devils, leading them to the Stanley Cup in 2003 while winning over 40 games in both seasons as coach of the team. He resigned in 2005 in an effort to focus on his health and treatment following a cancer diagnosis in 2004, though he remained with the organisation as a special assignment coach.

== Personal life ==
Burns was born in Montreal in 1952 to Geralda "Louise" Girardeau and Alfred Burns. Pat was the youngest of 6 children, he has 4 older sisters and 1 older brother (Violet, Alfred "Sonny", Lillian, Phyllis and Diane).

The Burns family moved to Gatineau, Quebec, following the death of Alfred in an industrial incident, when Pat was 4 years old.

Before his career in hockey, he was a police officer in Gatineau. Burns originally studied to be a welder, but became a police officer after hearing they were in need for positions. Burns had lied about his age to get the job, stating he was 18 when in actuality, he was 17. He would hold the position for sixteen years.

Burns survived colon cancer in 2004 and liver cancer in 2005, retiring from coaching after the second diagnosis. In 2009 Burns announced that his colon cancer had returned and metastasized to his lungs, was thus inoperable, and therefore he decided to forgo further treatment. During an April 2010 interview Burns stated "I know my life is nearing its end and I accept that." Gesturing to a group of local minor hockey players, he said: "A young player could come from Stanstead who plays in an arena named after me. I probably won't see the project to the end, but let's hope I'm looking down on it and see a young Wayne Gretzky or Mario Lemieux."

He was married to Line Burns. He had two children, a son from a long-term relationship and a daughter from a previous marriage.

He was the cousin of Robin Burns.

== Death ==
It was reported on September 16, 2010, that Burns's health had suddenly deteriorated and that he had returned to his home in Magog, Quebec, to be with his family. Reports surfaced the following day that Burns had died that morning, but Burns's son denied news reports that his father had died. That same day, an online report by the Toronto Sun also incorrectly reported Burns's death, but was quickly revealed to be erroneous. Burns himself talked to both English and French media about the incident, denying that he had died and asked that his status be clarified immediately.

He died on November 19, 2010, in Sherbrooke, Quebec, at the Maison Aube-Lumière, of colon cancer at age 58, which had eventually spread to his lungs.

Shortly after his funeral, thieves broke into Burns's widow's car, stealing personal belongings, credit cards and numerous pieces of hockey memorabilia, including 30 autographed NHL jerseys that were to be auctioned for charity. Some of the items were later recovered. One day after his death, prior to a game between the Toronto Maple Leafs and Montreal Canadiens (two of the teams he coached) at the Bell Centre, there was a special tribute video highlighting the great moments of his coaching career, followed by a moment of silence.

== Legacy ==
Burns has been frequently mentioned as one of the best coaches in the history of the National Hockey League, often appearing in lists and discussions between fans and sports websites.

Burns is the only coach in history to win the Jack Adams Award three separate times, with all three of his wins came in his introductory season with that respective NHL team. He led two teams to the Stanley Cup Finals in inaugural seasons with two teams, losing in 1989 and winning in 2003. He coached four total teams and led each to the playoffs at least twice.

In 2011, an arena bearing Burns's name was built at Stanstead College, a private boarding school in the Eastern Townships.

On March 26, 2010, a Facebook group was launched by three Canadian hockey fans calling for Burns to be inducted into the Hockey Hall of Fame before he succumbed to cancer. The "Let's Get Pat Burns into the Hockey Hall of Fame – NOW!" group attracted over 39,000 members in its first week. In its second week the group's membership had grown to over 54,000, and surpassed 80,000 at its conclusion. Burns was not selected for the 2010 class of inductees, and was posthumously announced as an inductee on June 23, 2014.

== Coaching record ==
| Team | Year | Regular season | | | | | | | Post season | | | |
| Team | Year | G | W | L | T | OTL | Pts | Finish | W | L | Win % | Result |
|---|---|---|---|---|---|---|---|---|---|---|---|---|
| MTL | 1988–89 | 80 | 53 | 18 | 9 | — | 115 | 1st in Adams | 14 | 7 | .667 | Lost in Stanley Cup Final (CGY) |
| MTL | 1989–90 | 80 | 41 | 28 | 11 | — | 93 | 3rd in Adams | 5 | 6 | .455 | Lost in Division finals (BOS) |
| MTL | 1990–91 | 80 | 39 | 30 | 11 | — | 89 | 2nd in Adams | 7 | 6 | .538 | Lost in Division finals (BOS) |
| MTL | 1991–92 | 80 | 41 | 28 | 11 | — | 93 | 1st in Adams | 4 | 7 | .364 | Lost in Division finals (BOS) |
| MTL Total | | 320 | 174 | 104 | 42 | – | | | 30 | 26 | .536 | 4 playoff appearances |
| TOR | 1992–93 | 84 | 44 | 29 | 11 | — | 99 | 3rd in Norris | 11 | 10 | .524 | Lost in Conference finals (LAK) |
| TOR | 1993–94 | 84 | 43 | 29 | 12 | — | 98 | 2nd in Central | 9 | 9 | .500 | Lost in Conference finals (VAN) |
| TOR | 1994–95 | 48 | 21 | 19 | 8 | — | 50 | 4th in Central | 3 | 4 | .429 | Lost in Conference quarterfinals (CHI) |
| TOR | 1995–96 | 65 | 25 | 30 | 10 | — | (60) | (fired) | — | — | — | — |
| TOR Total | | 281 | 133 | 107 | 41 | – | | | 23 | 23 | .500 | 3 playoff appearances |
| BOS | 1997–98 | 82 | 39 | 30 | 13 | — | 91 | 2nd in Northeast | 2 | 4 | .333 | Lost in Conference quarterfinals (WAS) |
| BOS | 1998–99 | 82 | 39 | 30 | 13 | — | 91 | 3rd in Northeast | 6 | 6 | .500 | Lost in Conference semifinals (BUF) |
| BOS | 1999–2000 | 82 | 24 | 33 | 19 | 6 | 73 | 5th in Northeast | — | — | — | Missed playoffs |
| BOS | 2000–01 | 8 | 3 | 4 | 1 | 0 | (7) | (fired) | — | — | — | — |
| BOS Total | | 254 | 105 | 97 | 46 | 6 | | | 8 | 10 | .444 | 2 playoff appearances |
| NJD | 2002–03 | 82 | 46 | 20 | 10 | 6 | 108 | 1st in Atlantic | 16 | 8 | .667 | Won Stanley Cup (ANA) |
| NJD | 2003–04 | 82 | 43 | 25 | 12 | 2 | 100 | 2nd in Atlantic | 1 | 4 | .200 | Lost in Conference quarterfinals (PHI) |
| NJD Total | | 164 | 89 | 45 | 22 | 8 | | | 17 | 12 | .586 | 2 playoff appearances |
| Total | | 1,019 | 501 | 353 | 151 | 14 | | | 78 | 71 | .523 | 1 Stanley Cup 11 playoff appearances |

== See also ==
- List of NHL head coaches

Awards
| Preceded by Jacques Demers | Winner of the Jack Adams Award; 1989 | Succeeded by Bob Murdoch |
| Preceded by Pat Quinn | Winner of the Jack Adams Award; 1993 | Succeeded by Jacques Lemaire |
| Preceded by Ted Nolan | Winner of the Jack Adams Award; 1998 | Succeeded by Jacques Martin |
Sporting positions
| Preceded by Jean Perron | Head coach of the Montreal Canadiens; 1988–1992 | Succeeded by Jacques Demers |
| Preceded by Tom Watt | Head coach of the Toronto Maple Leafs; 1992–1996 | Succeeded by Nick Beverley |
| Preceded by Steve Kasper | Head coach of the Boston Bruins; 1997–2000 | Succeeded by Mike Keenan |
| Preceded by Kevin Constantine | Head coach of the New Jersey Devils; 2002–04 | Succeeded by Larry Robinson |
