= Harrington on Hold 'em =

Series of books about poker strategy

- Cover page for the first book in the series
- Volume 1: Strategic Play (2004); Volume 2: The Endgame (2005); Volume 3: The Workbook (2006)
- Author: Dan Harrington
- Country: United States
- Language: English
- Publisher: Two Plus Two Publishing

Harrington on Hold 'em is a series of poker books about poker strategy, particularly for Texas hold 'em poker tournaments. They were all written by Dan Harrington and Bill Robertie and published by Two Plus Two Publishing.

== Background ==
The Harrington on Hold 'em series of books were written by Bill Robertie and Dan Harrington, a professional poker player who has earned over US$4.5 million during his poker career. He has won two World Series of Poker bracelets, including one from the 1995 World Series of Poker Main Event, and he has made it to four final tables in total at the World Series of Poker (in 1987, 1995, 2003, and 2004).

== Synopsis ==
Volume 1: Strategic Play (ISBN 978-1880685334), which contains seven key sections, begins by introducing the reader to poker and its history, along with a glossary of poker terms. The book is not written for novices to the game, therefore it does not include some of the more basic information about the game, such as poker hands, the game's mechanics, betting, etc. This entry in the series focuses on the basics of poker, such as playing styles, starting hands, pot odds, and hand analysis. CardPlayer felt that Harrington, a former chess master, wrote the book like a chess guide, noting, "He poses situations, asks the relevant questions, and then provides solutions. A simple diagram depicts position, blinds, and chip stacks, and then a specific challenge is articulated."

Volume 2: The Endgame (ISBN 978-1880685358) focuses on strategies used in poker tournaments, particularly on how to change playing styles depending on how large a chipstack is compared to the blinds. It also introduces related concepts such as the M-ratio and the Q-ratio.

Volume 3: The Workbook (ISBN 978-1880685365) is essentially a workbook containing many example scenarios for readers to apply concepts learned from the first two volumes in the series.

== Reception ==
Greg Hill of the website Poker News noted that since Volume 1 does not include some of the more basic information about poker, it potentially discriminates against novice players and therefore could possibly be restricting the book's audience to a more limited audience. However, Hill noted that the book is "well written and well structured", making it easy to pick up the book and begin reading from any section of interest. Tim Peters of poker magazine CardPlayer felt that the books are essential in helping players prepare for poker tournaments. Jeff Haney of the Las Vegas Sun considers the series to be "required reading" for anyone interested in participating in high-stakes tournament poker. The level of play in major poker tournaments have gotten significantly tougher and more competitive since the release of the first book in the series, according to several experts on poker tournaments, including poker professional Blair Rodman and Mason Malmuth, the owner of the books' publishing company. Harrington himself is sometimes the victim of the strategies that he suggests in his books. In addition, players have thanked him afterward for teaching them the new moves. "I find people are using a lot of the techniques I wrote about in the books against me," said Harrington.
