= Levins =

Levins is a surname. Notable people with the surname include:

- Bill Levins (1922–1991), American ice hockey executive and sports entrepreneur
- Cameron Levins (born 1989), Canadian long-distance runner
- Joe Levins (born 1968), American alpine skier
- Richard Levins (1930–2016), American Marxist biologist
