= List of current AHL general managers =

This is a list of current general managers in the American Hockey League. In the American Hockey League, the general manager of a team typically controls player transactions and bears the primary responsibility on behalf of the hockey club during contract discussions with players.

Unlike in the NHL, The general manager of an AHL club is not solely responsible for hiring, firing, and supervising the head and assistant coaches, amateur and professional scouts, and all other hockey operations staff for their team, as these duties are usually shared with the general manager of that AHL affiliate's parent club, who also performs these duties in tandem with their identical duties at the NHL level. Craig Heisinger has been the general manager of the Manitoba Moose since 2002. He is longest tenured general manager in the American Hockey League.

== Current AHL general managers ==
Team	General manager	Tenured since	Pro career	References
Abbotsford Canucks	Richard Seeley	June 11, 2026	1999–2011	
Bakersfield Condors	Keith Gretzky	June 11, 2019	1987–1993	
Belleville Senators	Matt Turek	May 15, 2025	None	
Calgary Wranglers	Brad Pascall	June 6, 2014	1992–1995	
Charlotte Checkers	Paul Krepelka	June 2024	None	
Chicago Wolves	Darren Yorke	August 16, 2024	None	
Cleveland Monsters	Chris Clark	June 12, 2019	1998–2011	
Coachella Valley Firebirds	Troy Bodie (de facto)	May 21, 2021	2008–2015	
Colorado Eagles	Kevin McDonald	July 22, 2022	None	
Grand Rapids Griffins	Shawn Horcoff	February 4, 2022	2000–2016	
Hamilton Hammers	Chris Lamoriello	August 26, 2016	None	
Hartford Wolf Pack	Ryan Martin	August 25, 2021	None	
Henderson Silver Knights	Tim Speltz	August 31, 2021	None	
Hershey Bears	Bryan Helmer (de facto)	July 21, 2016	1993–2013	
Iowa Wild	Matt Hendricks	May 15, 2024	2004–2019	
Laval Rocket	John Sedgwick	February 23, 2022	None	
Lehigh Valley Phantoms	Alyn McCauley (de facto)	June 2, 2023	1997–2007	
Manitoba Moose	Craig Heisinger	July 15, 2002	None	
Milwaukee Admirals	Scott Nichol	May 22, 2018	1994–2013	
Ontario Reign	Richard Seeley	June 6, 2018	1999–2011	
Providence Bruins	Evan Gold	March 29, 2023	None	
Rochester Americans	Jason Karmanos	April 14, 2021	None	
Rockford IceHogs	Mark Bernard (de facto)	July 3, 2008	1992–2016	
San Diego Gulls	Rick Paterson	May 14, 2024	1978–1988	
San Jose Barracuda	Joe Will	July 10, 2013	None	
Springfield Thunderbirds	Kevin Maxwell	August 1, 2022	1976–1988	
Syracuse Crunch	Joël Bouchard	July 7, 2025	1995–2012	
Texas Stars	Scott White	November 19, 2008	1994–2008	
Toronto Marlies	Ryan Hardy	June 25, 2021	None	
Tucson Roadrunners	John Ferguson Jr.	September 15, 2021	1989–1993	
Utica Comets	Dan MacKinnon	June 27, 2016	None	
Wilkes-Barre/Scranton Penguins	Jason Spezza	August 19, 2024	2002–2022	

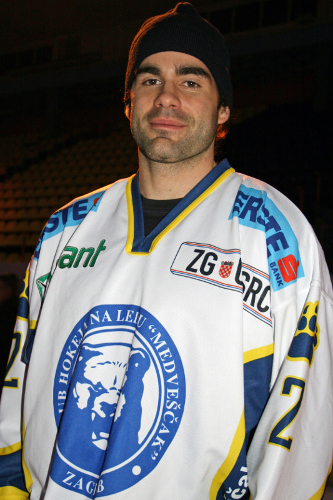
Richard Seeley, Abbotsford Canucks

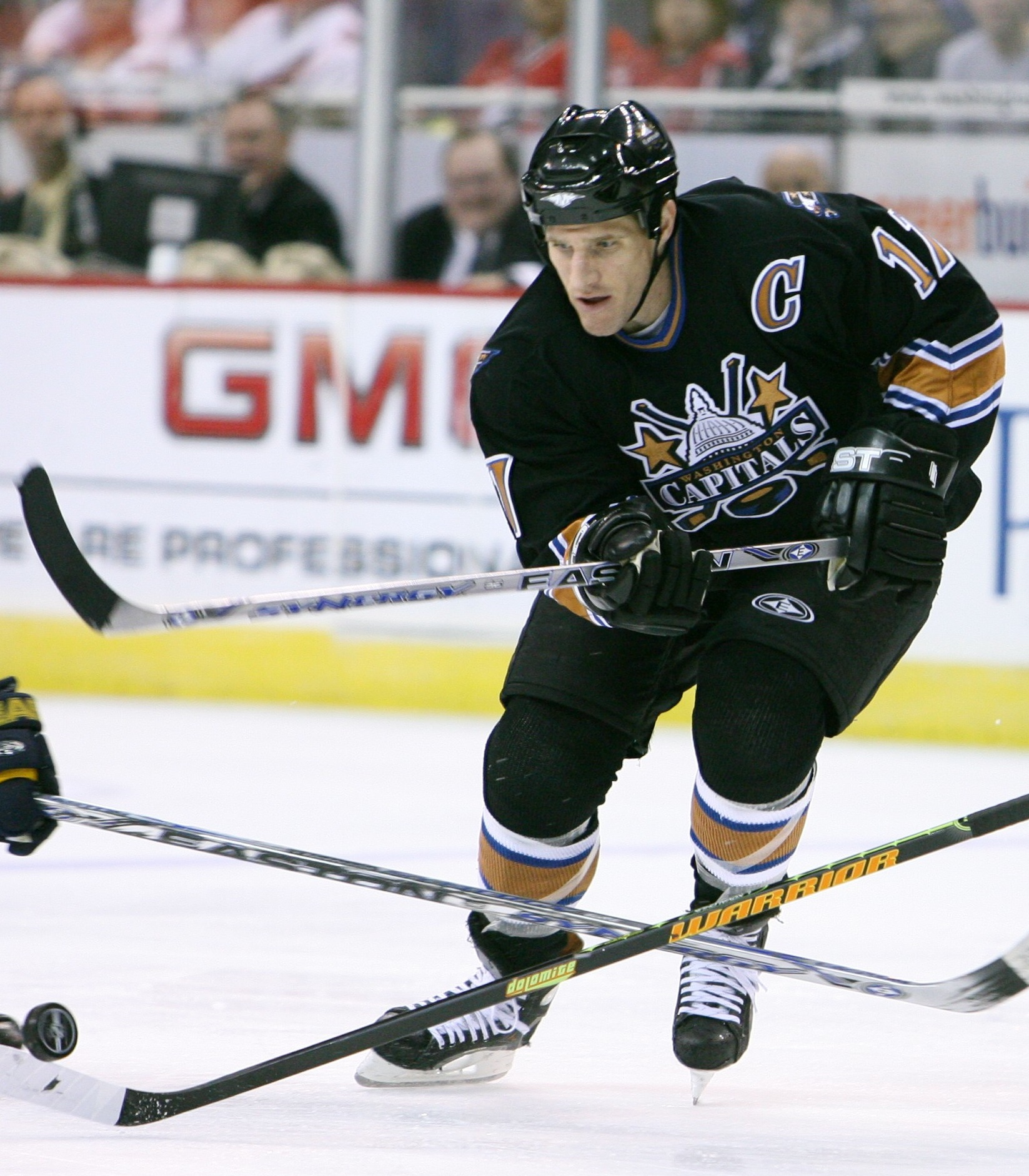
Chris Clark, Cleveland Monsters

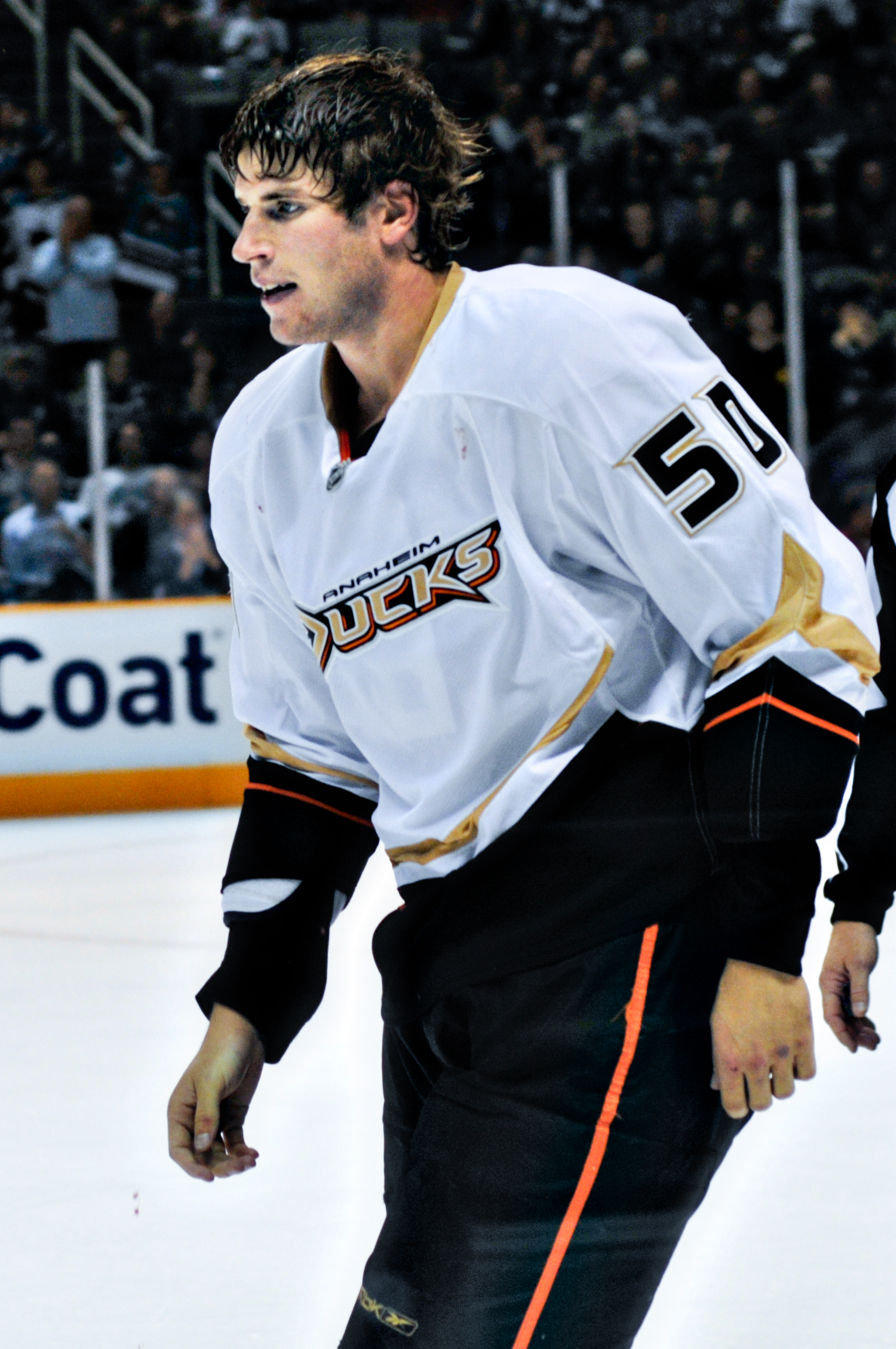
Troy Bodie, Coachella Valley Firebirds

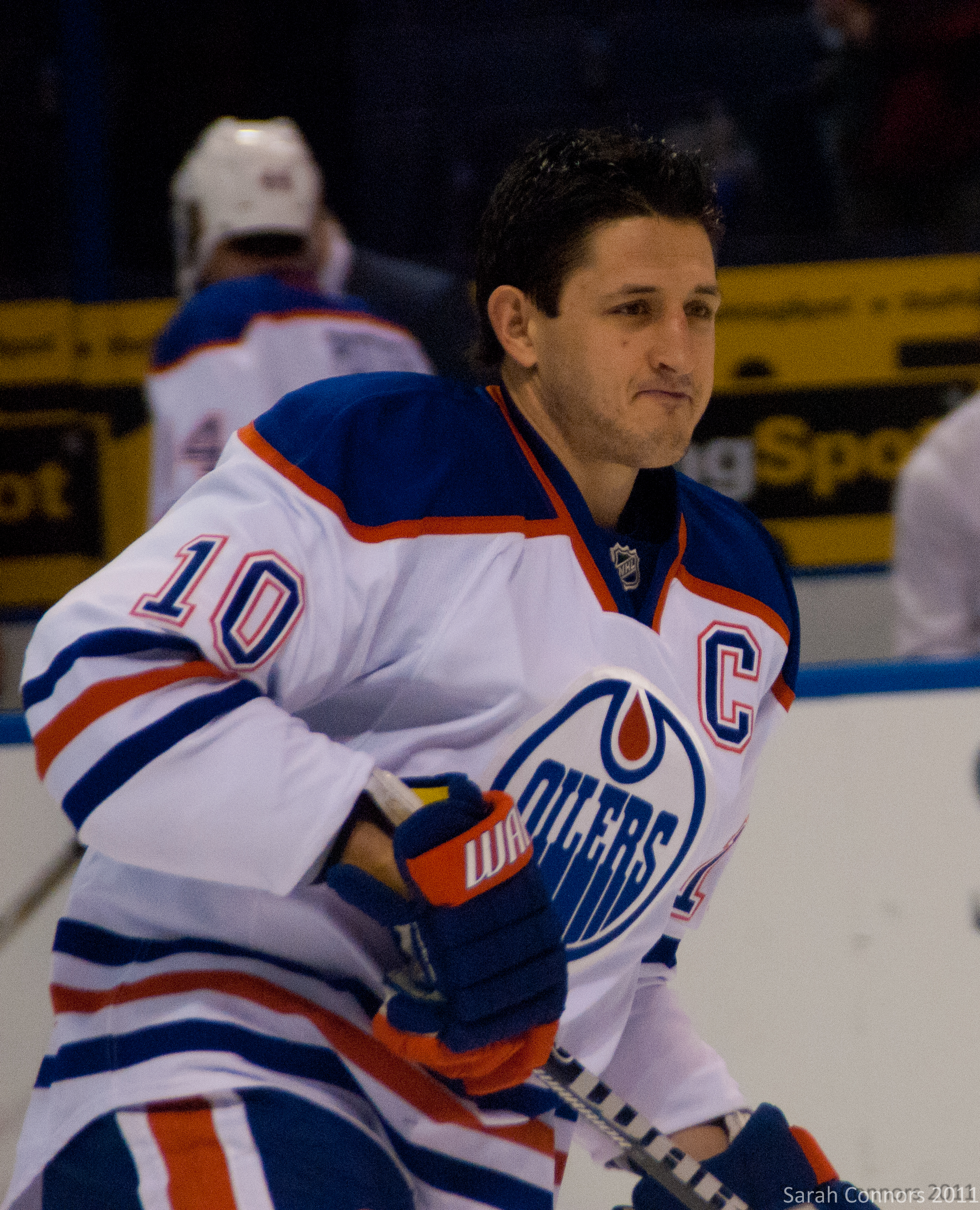
Shawn Horcoff, Grand Rapids Griffins

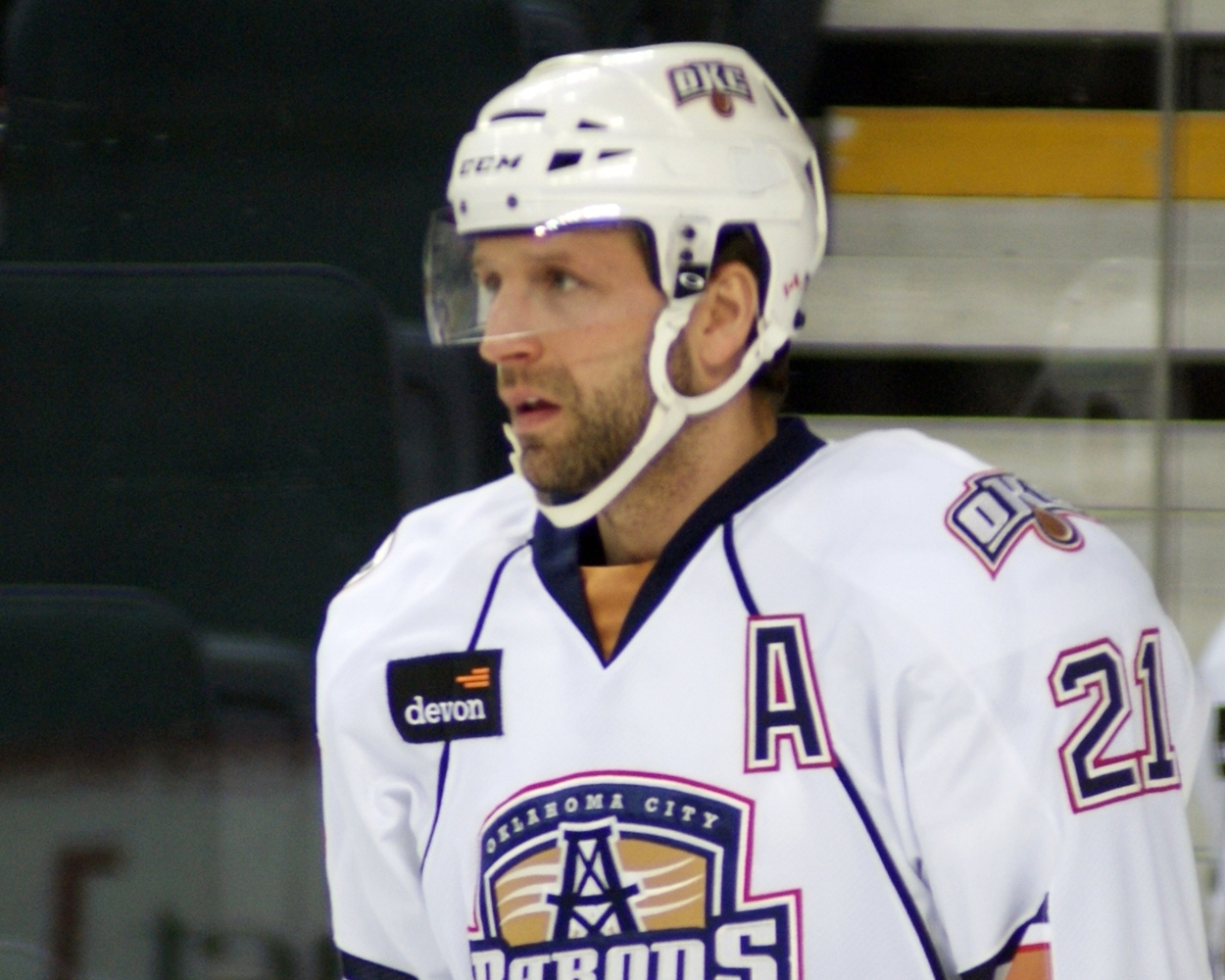
Bryan Helmer, Hershey Bears

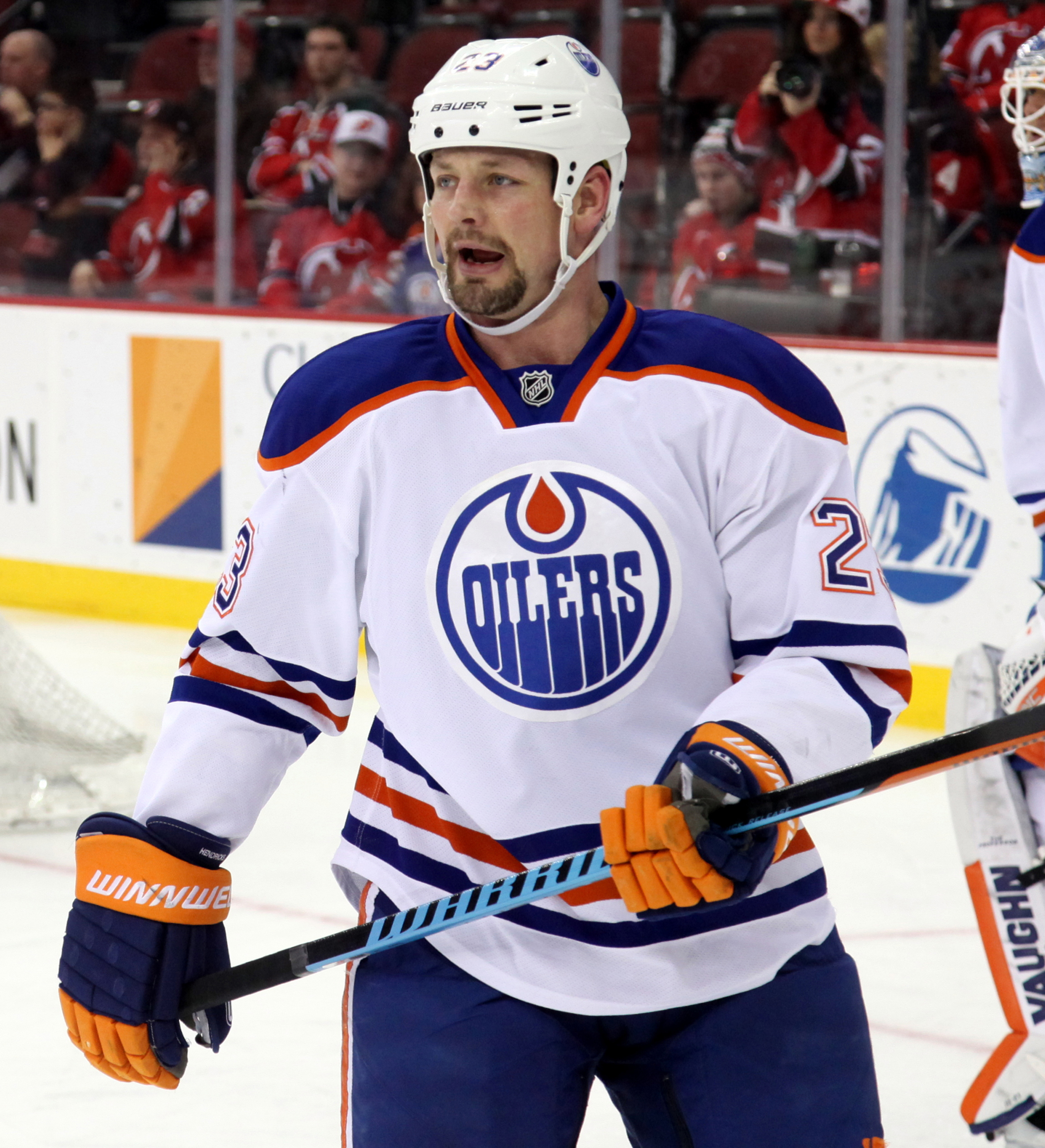
Matt Hendricks, Iowa Wild

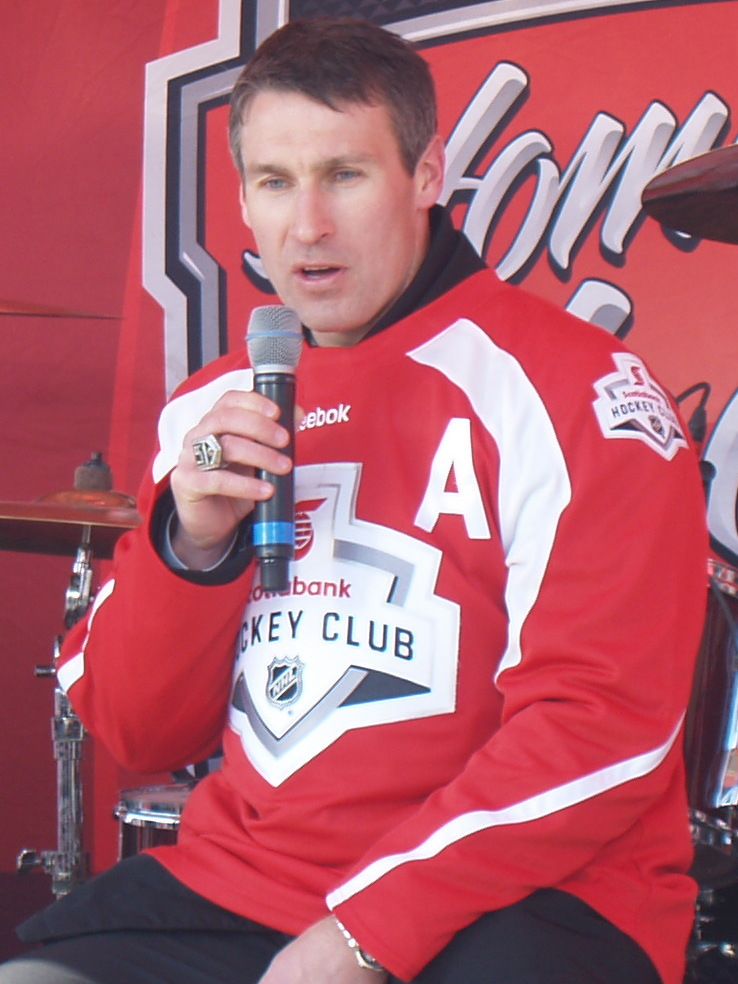
Alyn McCauley, Lehigh Valley Phantoms

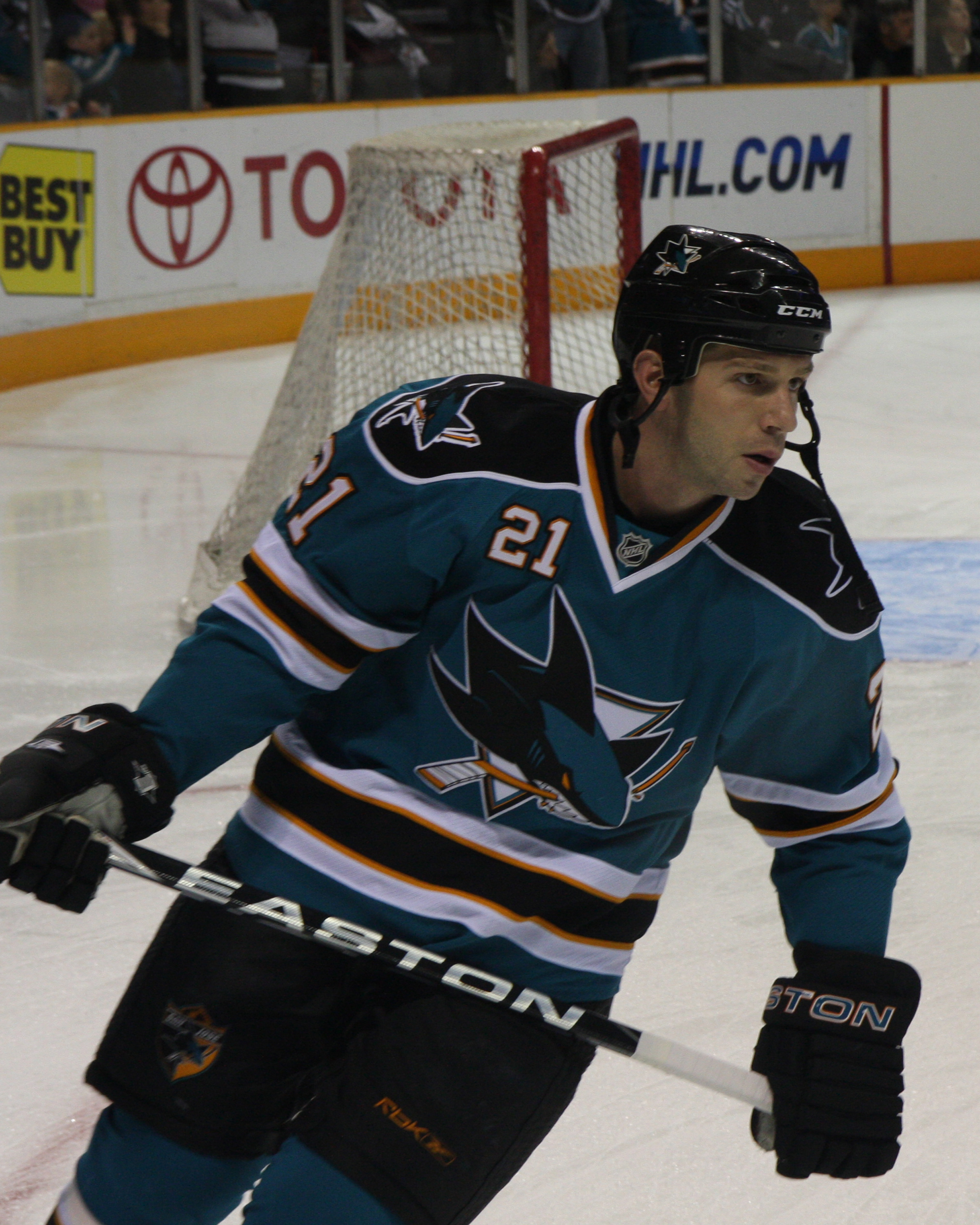
Scott Nichol, Milwaukee Admirals

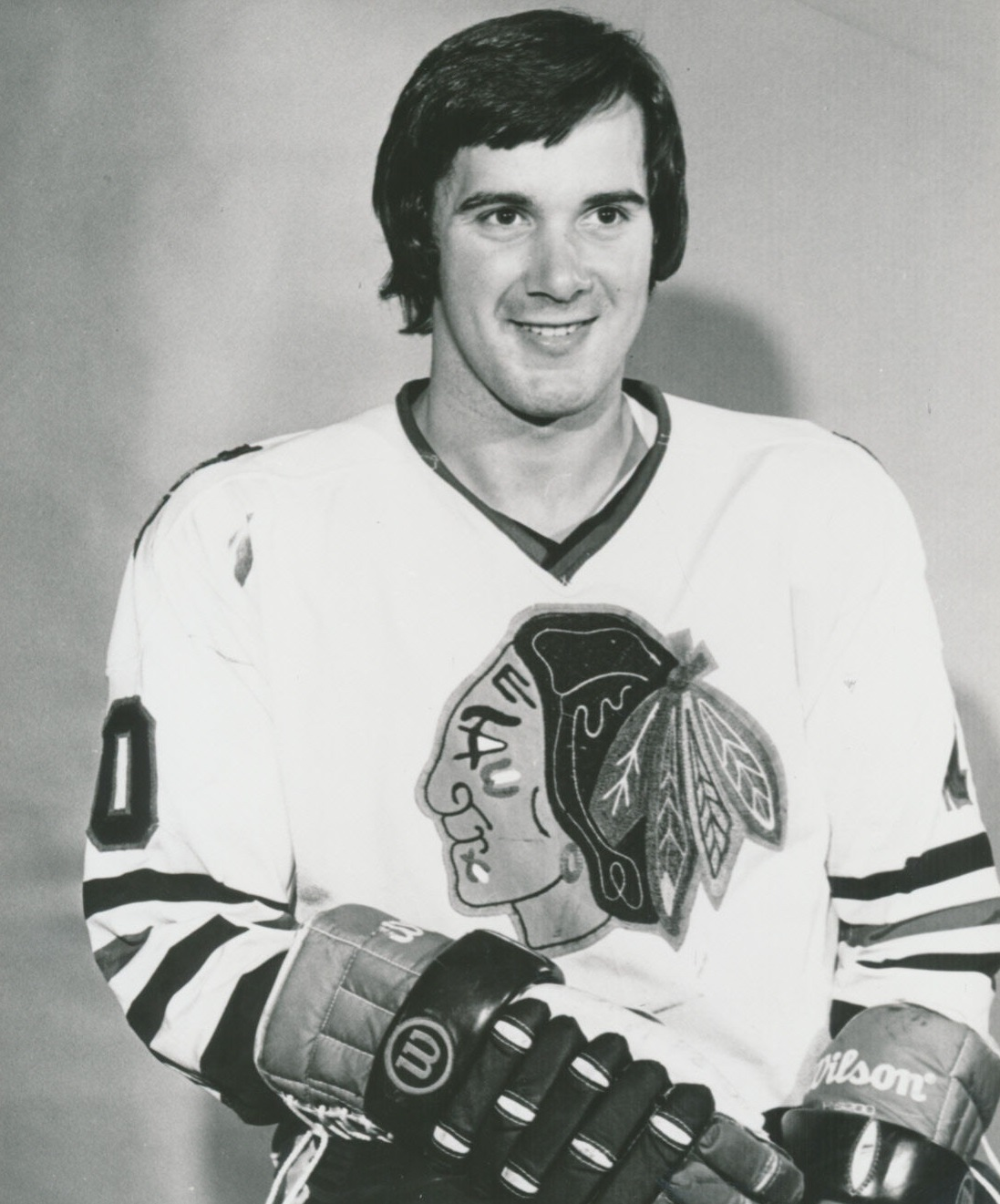
Rick Paterson, San Diego Gulls

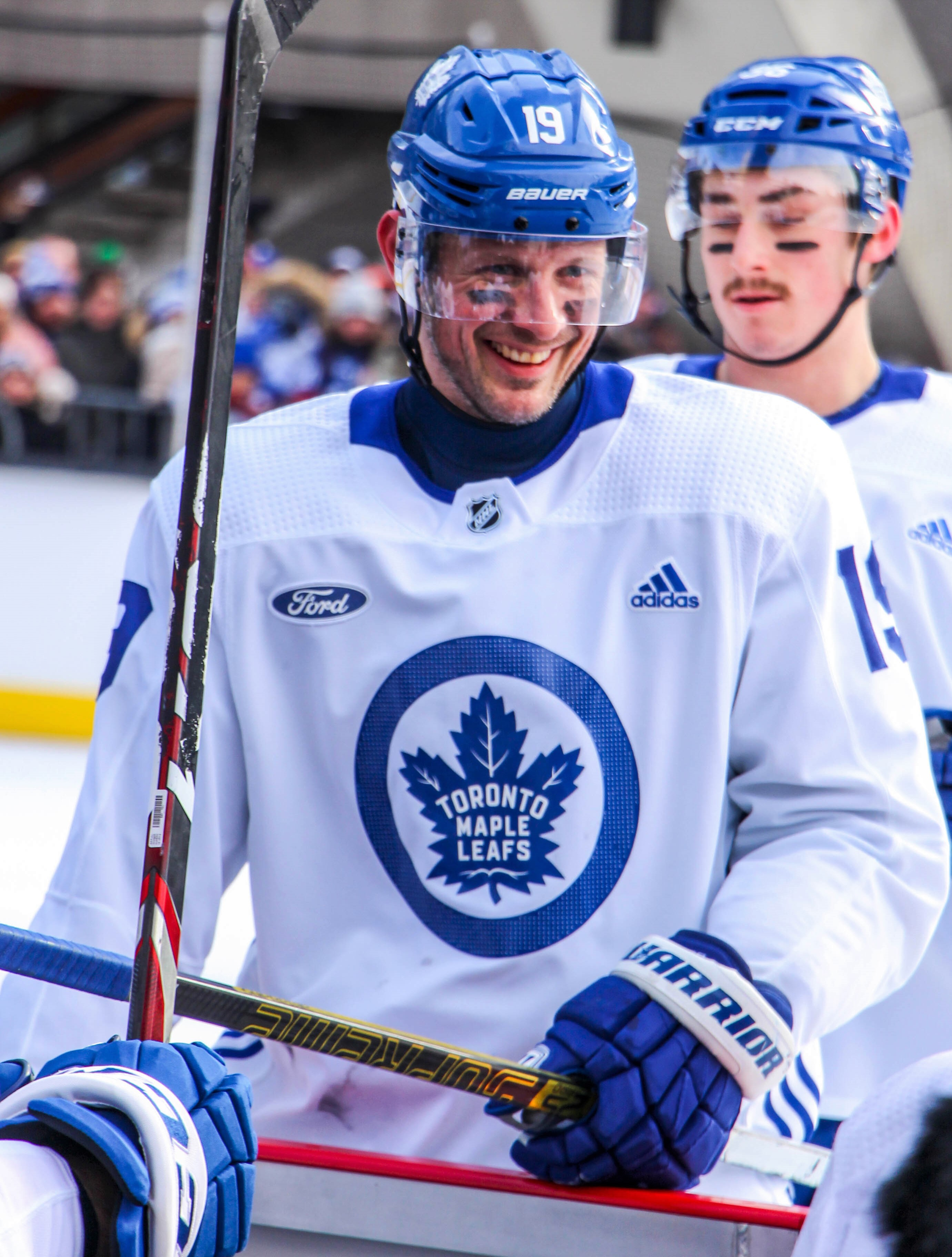
Jason Spezza, Wilkes-Barre/Scranton Penguins

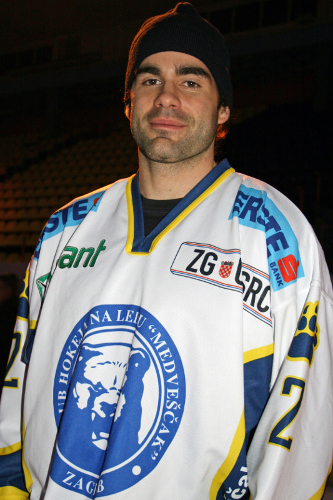
