= Sunny Mehta =

American poker player, author, and hockey director (born 1978)

- Born: April 7, 1978 (age 48); Grand Rapids, Michigan, U.S.
- Education: University of Miami; City University of New York
- Occupation: Ice hockey executive
- Years active: 2014–present
- Employer(s): New Jersey Devils (2014–2017, 2026–present); Washington Capitals (2019–2020); Florida Panthers (2020–2026)
- Organization: New Jersey Devils
- Title: General manager

Sunny Mehta (born April 7, 1978) is an American hockey executive, data scientist, and former professional poker player, writer, options trader, and musician who is the general manager of the New Jersey Devils of the National Hockey League (NHL). Mehta pioneered the first full-time analytics department in the National Hockey League in his previous role as the Devils' director of hockey analytics, before winning two Stanley Cups as assistant general manager of the Florida Panthers. He is co-author of two bestselling poker strategy books.

== Early life and education ==
Mehta grew up in Wyckoff, New Jersey, and graduated from Ramapo High School, where he played varsity ice hockey. He studied Jazz Guitar and Studio Music at the University of Miami Frost School of Music, and then moved to New Orleans, Louisiana, to perform and record with various local acts. He later worked as a derivatives trader at the Chicago Board of Trade, and received a master's in data science from the City University of New York.

== Career ==
=== Poker ===
Mehta began playing poker as a hobby in 2003, and by 2004 was playing professionally in high-stakes no-limit Texas hold 'em games. After moving to Las Vegas, Nevada in 2005 in the wake of Hurricane Katrina, he met poker author Ed Miller and publisher Mason Malmuth. Mehta and Miller, along with poker player Matt Flynn, co-authored "Professional No-Limit Hold 'em: Volume I", which was released by Malmuth's Two Plus Two Publishing in 2007. The book immediately became the #1 gambling and poker book on Amazon's bestseller list.

The author team of Mehta, Miller, and Flynn left Two Plus Two to self-publish their highly anticipated second book, "Small Stakes No-Limit Hold'em", which was released in 2009.

=== Hockey ===
Mehta went on to do statistical analysis of National Hockey League hockey games, and he published articles about it. He was part of the early wave of advanced analytics use in hockey, contributing to resources such as Behind The Net, Objective NHL, and Irreverent Oiler Fans. He worked with the Phoenix Coyotes in 2010 and was hired by the New Jersey Devils in 2014 to serve as director of hockey analytics and start the first full-time analytics department in the NHL. He has additionally consulted for the Washington Capitals, as well as six Major League Baseball teams.

Mehta was hired by the Florida Panthers in 2020 as vice president of hockey strategy and intelligence, and he was promoted to assistant general manager and head of analytics in 2023. With the Panthers, he won two Stanley Cup championships and had teams appear in three Stanley Cup finals.

In April 2026, Mehta began to attract buzz as a potential general manager replacement for a number of NHL teams, including the Toronto Maple Leafs, whom he was connected to. On April 16, Mehta was hired by the Devils to return to the organization where he started his hockey executive career, succeeding Tom Fitzgerald as general manager.

== Accomplishments ==
- Stanley Cup champion (as executive) — 2025, 2024
- Ed Miller; Sunny Mehta; Matt Flynn (2009). Small Stakes No-Limit Hold'em.
- Matt Flynn; Sunny Mehta; Ed Miller (2007). Professional No Limit Hold 'Em: Volume I. Two Plus Two Publishing LLC. ISBN 978-1-880685-40-2.
- 13th place in the 2006 World Poker Open $1,500 Buy-In No-Limit Hold 'em Event
- Scoot Boogie Baby (Media notes). Lani Ramos (Sunny Mehta - guitar). 2004.
- Eddie Dejean and the New Orleans Funk Project (Media notes). Eddie Dejean and the New Orleans Funk Project (Sunny Mehta - guitar). 2003.

Sporting positions
Preceded by Tom Fitzgerald	General manager of the New Jersey Devils; 2026–present	Incumbent
