= Lou Lamoriello =

American ice hockey executive

- Hockey Hall of Fame, 2009 (Builder)
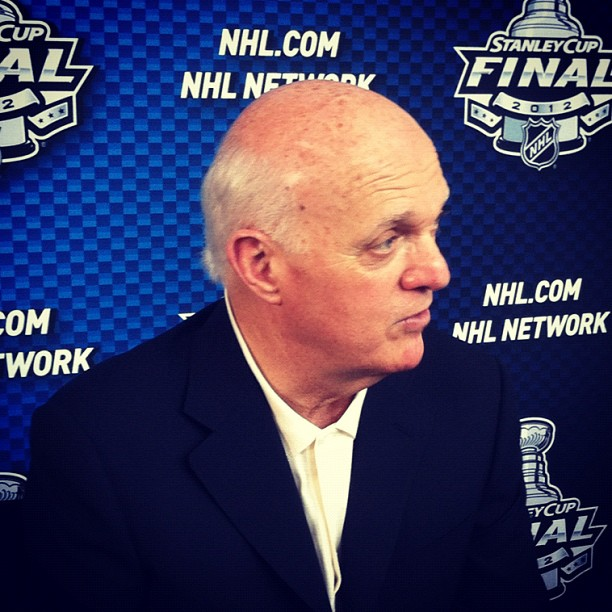
- Lamoriello in 2012
- Born: October 21, 1942 (age 84) Johnston, Rhode Island, U.S.
- Coached for: New Jersey Devils
- Coaching career: 1968–2007

Louis P. Lamoriello (/læmər.ɛl.oʊ/; born October 21, 1942) is an American professional ice hockey executive who most recently served as the president of hockey operations and general manager for the New York Islanders of the National Hockey League (NHL). He was formerly the long-time general manager of the New Jersey Devils and also served in the position with the Toronto Maple Leafs. Lamoriello's tenure as president and general manager of the New Jersey Devils from 1987 to 2015 was the third-longest tenure by an NHL general manager with a single team, following those of Conn Smythe and Art Ross. Lamoriello resigned from New Jersey on May 4, 2015, and became the 16th general manager of the Maple Leafs on July 23 of the same year. After three years with the Maple Leafs, Lamoriello joined the Islanders, with whom he served until 2025.

Under Lamoriello's management, the Devils, who had been barely competitive for their first five years in New Jersey, became one of the most successful teams in the NHL. The Devils made the Stanley Cup playoffs all but three times between 1988 and 2012, qualified for five Stanley Cup Final (in 1995, 2000, 2001, 2003, and 2012) and won the Stanley Cup three times (in 1995, 2000, and 2003). Lamoriello also was general manager for Team USA in the 1996 World Cup of Hockey, in which the U.S. won the championship, as well as for the 1998 Winter Olympics in Nagano. Lamoriello also played a key role in negotiating the settlement of the 2004–05 NHL lockout to resume play for the 2005–06 season.

In 2009, Lamoriello was inducted into the Hockey Hall of Fame in the builders category, while in 2012, Lamoriello was inducted into the United States Hockey Hall of Fame.

From 2001 to 2004, Lamoriello also was CEO of the New Jersey Nets of the National Basketball Association.

== Early life ==
Lamoriello was born in Johnston, Rhode Island. After attending La Salle Academy in Providence, Rhode Island, Lamoriello graduated from Providence College in 1963. He received varsity letters in baseball and hockey and served each team as captain during his senior year. He played collegiate summer baseball in the Cape Cod Baseball League (CCBL) for the Harwich Mariners (1961–62), Orleans Cardinals (1963), and in 1964 as the player-manager of the Bourne Canalmen. A star player, he remained in the league after his playing days, capturing the league championship in 1965 as field manager of the Sagamore Clouters, and in 1967 managing the Yarmouth Indians. In 2009, Lamoriello was inducted into the CCBL Hall of Fame.

Lamoriello was a math teacher at Johnston Senior High School in Johnston, Rhode Island, for several years ending in the early 1970s.

== College hockey career ==
Lamoriello became head coach of the Providence College Friars men's ice hockey team in 1968 and became athletic director in July 1982. During the 1982–83 season, the Friars were 33–10–0, the best record in the nation that year, and appeared in the Frozen Four for the first time since 1964. Lamoriello resigned as head coach in 1983. As athletic director, he hired Rick Pitino as the head coach of the men's basketball team; Pitino would go on to take Providence to the Final Four in 1987.

In July 1983, Lamoriello joined his fellow athletic directors at Boston College, Boston University, the University of New Hampshire and Northeastern University in forming the Hockey East Association. He helped produce an interlocking schedule agreement with the Western Collegiate Hockey Association (WCHA) and negotiate the first television package in college ice hockey.

Lamoriello was the first commissioner of Hockey East. The conference's executive committee voted on March 7, 1988, to name the conference championship trophy in his honor, as the Lamoriello Trophy. A permanent trophy was commissioned and was presented at the 1999 championship.

On April 30, 1987, Lamoriello resigned as Hockey East commissioner and as athletic director at Providence to become president of the NHL's New Jersey Devils.

== Executive career ==
=== New Jersey Devils (1987–2015) ===
In April 1987, Devils then-owner John McMullen appointed Lamoriello team president. Lamoriello named himself general manager just before the start of the 1987–88 season, a move that surprised many NHL observers. He had never played, coached or managed in the NHL, and was virtually unknown outside the American college hockey community.

Over the next 28 years, Lamoriello presided over one of the most successful rebuilding projects in North American professional sports history. In his first season as general manager, the Devils notched their first winning season in franchise history (dating back to their time as the Kansas City Scouts [1974–76] and Colorado Rockies [1976–82]) and reached the Wales Conference Finals. The Devils made the playoffs in all but five of his 27 seasons as general manager, and appeared in the Stanley Cup Final in 1995 (won), 2000 (won), 2001 (lost), 2003 (won) and 2012 (lost).

Lamoriello said he studied the game for a long time before starting to manage at the NHL level. The former high school math teacher says that during his two-decade long tenure at Providence College, and later when commissioner of Hockey East, he followed professional hockey closely. When he started with the Devils in 1987, he says he took what he considered to be the best parts of the great teams — the Green Bay Packers, the New York Yankees and the Montreal Canadiens — and using his analytical background, applied them to managing the Devils.

"Lou's a model for our business. This is not just the best run franchise in the NHL, it’s the best-run franchise in pro sports," says long-time NHL executive and former Calgary Flames president of hockey operations, Brian Burke.

Lamoriello has been lauded by NHL Commissioner Gary Bettman for his key role in bringing Soviet hockey stars, such as Viacheslav Fetisov and Sergei Starikov, to the NHL in the late 1980s. "Clearly he was one of the visionaries that understood there were highly talented hockey players in the former Soviet Union that could have a place in this League," said Bettman. It was one of the reasons cited by Bettman for Lamiorello's 2009 induction into the Hockey Hall of Fame.

Lamoriello, backed by Scouting Director David Conte, is known as a master drafter, showing consistent shrewdness in identifying and signing top talent that other teams were passing over. For example, Hall-of-Famer goaltender Martin Brodeur was a 20th overall pick, while Czech star left winger Patrik Eliáš was drafted 51st. Players drafted in the first 20 picks have been the rare exception rather than the rule. "He hasn't been able to money-whip everybody the way the Yankees do, outspending the world every year. Lamoriello has done what he has done mostly by being smart and tough and holding the whole thing together by himself sometimes," says sports journalist Mike Lupica.

Lamoriello is well known in NHL circles for his hard-nosed approach to contract negotiations. Pat Verbeek, Kirk Muller and Bill Guerin, among others, have been traded out of town after losing contract negotiations. Lamoriello chose to let Bobby Holik become a free agent after the 2001-02 season; the New York Rangers' Glen Sather signed Holik to a five year deal totaling $45 million only for the Rangers to buy out the contract two years later and admit that Holik was overpaid. Lamoriello nearly traded Ken Daneyko, the Devils' all-time leader in games played, in 1989. According to Daneyko, Lamoriello believes in paying a third-line player as much as a first-line player if he feels they have the same value to the team.

Besides being thriftly in negotiations, Lamoriello has also fostered a "unique corporate culture" that has encouraged player loyalty, which in turn enabled him to assemble competitive teams at a considerably lower payroll, compared to the big-spending Atlantic Division rivals New York Rangers and Philadelphia Flyers, before the salary cap was implemented as a result of the 2004–05 NHL lockout. For example, Martin Brodeur frequently accepted below market contracts and stayed with the Devils for nearly his entire career, while defenseman Ken Daneyko played all 1,283 of his NHL games with the team. "I like to think of my players as a family," says Lamoriello. "And I like to think the success we’ve had through the years shows that the players value that as much as they do the Stanley Cups, knowing that the two go hand in hand." The rival New York Rangers under Neil Smith and then Glen Sather, despite their expensive free agent signings, missed the playoffs for seven consecutive seasons, from 1998 to 2004. Under Bobby Clarke, the Philadelphia Flyers from 1998 to 2002 had four first-round playoff exits, with just one appearance in the Conference Finals, as they suffered from frequent coaching changes and instability among goaltenders. Another division rival, the Pittsburgh Penguins, owed so much in deferred salaries, which combined with other financial pressures, forced them to file for Chapter 11 bankruptcy in November 1998, so former player Mario Lemieux became the team owner; the Penguins had to jettison most of their expensive star players after the 2000-01 season.

When Lamoriello is asked the key to his success, he says it has been his systematic approach to player development. "It’s the team character this squad has... that you build on. I don’t ever use the word 'rebuild.' Based on my college background, I like to look at my roster as my seniors, juniors, sophomores and freshmen and gauge their development and roster turnover based on players going from one of those classes into the next. You have to build your staff and encourage them to be creative and realistic in their approach—and (not) be afraid to make a mistake. We stress that in drafting, player development, and coaching. You grow from your mistakes. I know I have."

When others are asked what makes Lamoriello successful, his dedication and singular focus on winning are mentioned again and again. Despite public disagreements, winger Claude Lemieux and former assistant coach John MacLean returned to the organization because of Lamioriello's "dedication to winning". Veteran Devils defenseman Ken Daneyko says Lamoriello's key factors in success are "his winning attitude, discipline and dedication. Nobody works harder".

Lamoriello's rosters and coaches have attracted some criticism. Defenseman and captain Scott Stevens was a devastating open-ice hitter, being accused of intentionally trying to physically injure players permanently, although his hits were clean for that era of hockey. Head coach Jacques Lemaire's unorthodox coaching style was a defensive-minded system often using a strategy called the neutral zone trap. The neutral zone trap was controversial for contributing to low scoring and unexciting games in the mid-1990s, and analysts accused it of "dragging down the entertainment quotient in this league" with one calling for the strategy to be banned. High scoring free agents often avoided signing with the New Jersey Devils due to this defense-first emphasis, as well as Lamoriello's thrifty ways in contract negotiations.

In 1992, Lamoriello was awarded the Lester Patrick Trophy for outstanding service to hockey in the United States. He also was general manager for Team USA in the 1996 World Cup of Hockey (in which the U.S. won the championship) and the 1998 Winter Olympics.

After YankeeNets bought the Devils in 2000, Lamoriello was named chairman and CEO of the Devils, as well as vice-chairman and CEO of the then co-owned New Jersey Nets. He dropped the chairmanship of the Devils and resigned his posts on the Nets after Jeffrey Vanderbeek bought the Devils from YankeeNets in 2004. For the most part, McMullen, Vanderbeek and most recent owner Josh Harris left the Devils' operations in Lamoriello's hands. On May 4, 2015, the Devils announced that Lamoriello had handed his general manager post to Ray Shero, though Lamoriello remained as team president for a few more months.

=== Toronto Maple Leafs (2015–2018) ===
On July 23, 2015, Lamoriello resigned from the New Jersey Devils to accept the general manager position with the Toronto Maple Leafs. For the first time in his NHL career, Lamoriello did not have the final say in hockey matters; he reported to Maple Leafs president Brendan Shanahan, who was the first player Lamoriello drafted as an NHL general manager in the 1987 NHL entry draft. On April 30, 2018, Shanahan informed Lamoriello that he would no longer continue as general manager, but would remain with the organization as a special advisor. Shanahan stated that Lamoriello's contract called for him to be general manager for three years before making a transition to an advisory role.

Much as he did in New Jersey, Lamoriello helped rebuild a previously moribund team. The Leafs had only made the playoffs once in ten years, but rebounded to make the playoffs in his last two seasons as general manager. Notable moves he made in Toronto include drafting Auston Matthews and trading for netminder Frederik Andersen.

=== New York Islanders (2018–2025) ===
On May 22, 2018, Lamoriello was hired by the New York Islanders as their president of hockey operations. On June 5, 2018, Lamoriello fired head coach Doug Weight and general manager Garth Snow and named himself general manager. On June 21, Lamoriello would go on to sign Barry Trotz as head coach fresh off a Stanley Cup victory, and a subsequent resignation from the Washington Capitals.

On October 21, 2022, Lamoriello became the first octogenarian general manager of an NHL franchise.

On April 22, 2025, the Islanders announced they would not renew Lamoriello's contract for the 2025–26 season.

== Brief coaching stints ==
On December 19, 2005, following the surprise resignation of Larry Robinson as Devils head coach, Lamoriello named himself interim head coach for the rest of the season. When asked on television after the Devils' victory over the New York Rangers in the first round of the playoffs if he was interested in becoming head coach permanently, Lamoriello replied, "Absolutely not," eventually hiring Claude Julien as head coach following the season.

On April 2, 2007, Lamoriello fired Julien and named himself interim coach once again. The firing took place with three games left in the season, when the Devils had the second-best record in the East and were on their way to setting a franchise record for regular season wins. However, Lamoriello did not believe Julien had the team ready for the playoffs.

On December 27, 2014, Lamoriello announced that he, along with Scott Stevens and Adam Oates, would act as co-head coaches of the Devils following the firing of Peter DeBoer the day prior.

== Head coaching record ==
=== College ===
Record table
Season	Team	Overall	Conference	Standing	Postseason
Providence Friars (ECAC Hockey) (1968–1983)
1968–69	Providence	7–14–0	4–11–0	14th	
1969–70	Providence	11–12–2	7–10–2	10th	
1970–71	Providence	17–11–0	12–7–0	6th	ECAC Quarterfinals
1971–72	Providence	14–9–1	9–8–0	8th	ECAC Quarterfinals
1972–73	Providence	11–14–0	6–11–0	14th	
1973–74	Providence	14–11–1	9–9–1	7th	ECAC Quarterfinals
1974–75	Providence	19–7–1	12–6–1	6th	ECAC Quarterfinals
1975–76	Providence	14–15–2	11–12–2	9th	
1976–77	Providence	17–13–0	14–11–0	8th	ECAC Quarterfinals
1977–78	Providence	17–15–2	12–9–2	7th	NCAA First Round
1978–79	Providence	16–10–2	13–9–2	6th	ECAC Quarterfinals
1979–80	Providence	21–11–0	17–6–0	2nd	ECAC Third Place Game (Win)
1980–81	Providence	17–15–1	12–9–1	7th	NCAA Quarterfinals
1981–82	Providence	20–12–1	13–8–0	t-4th	ECAC Quarterfinals
1982–83	Providence	33–10–0	16–5–0	1st	NCAA Third Place Game (Win)
Providence:		248–179–13	151–131–11		
Total:		248–179–13			
National champion Postseason invitational champion Conference regular season champion Conference regular season and conference tournament champion Division regular season champion Division regular season and conference tournament champion Conference tournament champion

=== NHL ===
Team	Year	Regular season						Postseason
Team	Year	G	W	L	OTL	Pts	Finish	Result
NJD	2005–06	50	32	14	4	(68)	1st in Atlantic	Lost in conference semifinals (CAR)
NJD	2006–07	3	2	0	1	(5)	1st in Atlantic	Lost in conference semifinals (OTT)
Total		53	34	14	5			2 playoff appearances

== Honors and achievements ==
In 1980, Lamoriello was inducted into the Providence College Athletic Hall of Fame.

In 1988, Hockey East named the conference championship trophy in Lamoriello's honour, the Lamoriello Trophy. A permanent trophy was commissioned and was presented at the 1999 championship.

On June 23, 2009, it was announced Lamoriello would be inducted into the Hockey Hall of Fame in the builders category. He was honoured during the November 6–9 induction weekend, alongside Brett Hull, Brian Leetch, Luc Robitaille and Steve Yzerman.

Lamoriello has been the general manager for three Stanley Cup championships, in 1995, 2000 and 2003.

Additionally, as a minority owner of Major League Baseball's New York Yankees, Lamoriello has a World Series ring from the Yankees' 2009 World Series championship.

On July 12, 2012, Lamoriello was inducted into the United States Hockey Hall of Fame.

On September 20, 2018, Lamoriello was inducted as a charter member of the Rhode Island Hockey Hall of Fame.

On June 22, 2021, Lamoriello became the first general manager to win the Jim Gregory General Manager of the Year Award twice.

== Personal life ==
Lou Lamoriello has three adult children: Christopher, Heidi and Tim. Christopher works for the New York Islanders as director of player personnel, previously having worked with the Devils in the scouting department, as the senior vice president of hockey operations, and the general manager of the Albany Devils. Tim is Senior Vice President and General Counsel at Legends Hospitality. His son Chris married Olympic gold medallist Vicki Movsessian.

== Awards and honors ==
Award	Year
College
All-ECAC Hockey Second Team	1962–63
NHL
Stanley Cup champion (as executive)	1994–95, 1999–2000, 2002–03
Jim Gregory General Manager of the Year Award	2019–20, 2020–21

Sporting positions
Preceded by Larry Robinson	Head coach of the New Jersey Devils (interim); 2005–2006	Succeeded by Claude Julien
Preceded by Claude Julien	Head coach of the New Jersey Devils (interim); 2007	Succeeded by Brent Sutter
Preceded by Max McNab	General manager of the New Jersey Devils; 1987–2015	Succeeded by Ray Shero
Preceded by Dave Nonis	General manager of the Toronto Maple Leafs; 2015–2018	Succeeded by Kyle Dubas
Preceded by Garth Snow	General manager of the New York Islanders; 2018–2025	Succeeded by Mathieu Darche
Awards and achievements
Preceded by Len Ceglarski	Hobey Baker Legends of College Hockey Award; 1997	Succeeded by Ned Harkness
