= M-ratio =

Measure of the health of a player's chip stack in poker

In no-limit or pot-limit poker, a player's M-ratio (also called "M number", "M factor" or just "M") is a measure of the health of a player's chip stack as a function of the cost to play each round. In simple terms, a player can sit passively in the game, making only compulsory bets, for M laps of the dealer button before running out of chips. A high M means the player can afford to wait a high number of rounds before making a move. The concept applies primarily in tournament poker; in a cash game, a player can in principle manipulate their M at will, simply by purchasing more chips.

A player with a low M must act soon or be weakened by the inability to force other players to fold with aggressive raises.

The term was named after Paul Magriel.

== Calculation ==
The M-ratio is calculated by the formula:

$$M = \frac{\mbox{stack}}{\mbox{small blind} + \mbox{big blind} + \mbox{total antes}}$$

For example, a player in an eight-player game with blinds of $50/$100, an ante of $10, and a stack of $2,300 has an M-ratio of 10:

$$M = \frac{2300}{50 + 100 + (10 \times 8)} = \frac{2300}{230} = 10$$

That is, if the player only makes the compulsory bets, they will be "blinded out" of the game in 10 rounds, or 80 hands.

Dan Harrington studied the concept in great detail in Harrington on Holdem: Volume II The Endgame, defining several "zones" in which the M-ratio may fall:

Zone name	M-ratio	"Optimal" strategy
Green zone	M ≥ 20	Most desirable situation, freedom to play conservatively or aggressively as you choose
Yellow zone	10 ≤ M < 20	Must take more risks, hands containing small pairs and small suited connectors lose value
Orange zone	6 ≤ M < 10	Main focus is to be first-in whatever you decide to play, important to preserve chips
Red zone	1 ≤ M < 6	Your only move is to move all-in or fold
Dead zone	M < 1	You are completely dependent on luck to survive. The only move is to push all-in into an empty pot

== Effective M ==
Harrington further develops the concept to account for shortening tables, as is seen at the closing stages of multi-table tournaments. The M-ratio is simply multiplied by the percentage of players remaining at the table, assuming a ten-player table to be "full".

$$M_{\mbox{Effective}} = M \times \left( \frac{\mbox{Players}}{10} \right)$$

Therefore, for a player with a "simple M ratio" of 9 at a five player table, the effective M is 4.5:

$$M_{\mbox{Effective}} = 9 \times \left( \frac{5}{10} \right) = 4.5$$

This means that although the player's simple M value places him in the orange zone, their effective M dictates a shift in playing style appropriate for the red zone. In essence, ten times the effective M denotes the expected number of hands a player can let pass before running out of chips.

== See also ==
- Q-ratio (poker)
