= Ray Miron =

Canadian ice hockey executive

- Born: Rodolph Miron; March 20, 1923; Cornwall, Ontario, Canada
- Died: August 28, 2015 (aged 92); Tulsa, Oklahoma, U.S.
- Occupation: ice hockey executive

Joseph Rodolph "Ray" Miron (March 20, 1923 – August 28, 2015) was an owner of the new Central Hockey League (CHL), as well as a National Hockey League (NHL) executive, serving in the Toronto Maple Leafs organization and as general manager of the NHL's Colorado Rockies. Miron co-founded the CHL with Bill Levins in 1992, under the concept of central ownership of all the teams. Miron had also previously coached in the previous Central Hockey League, and he was also president of that league for three weeks before leaving to accept the role of GM with the Rockies.

Miron served as the president of the new league after Levins' death. He sold the league in 2000. In recognition of his importance to the league, the championship trophy, formerly known as the Levin's Cup, was renamed to the Ray Miron Cup. After the CHL merged with the competing Western Professional Hockey League, the trophy was renamed to the "Ray Miron President's Cup." In 2004, Miron was awarded the Lester Patrick Trophy by the NHL, a recognition he described as his "greatest hockey accomplishment."

== Personal life ==
He played hockey growing up and played in the minor leagues. Miron has said he wasn't a strong enough skater to make it in the NHL. While working in a Canadian plant during World War II, Miron was in a mustard gas accident. The accident left much of his body covered in mustard acid, which severely burned him and left him in a hospital for months.

Miron met his wife Rowena in the 1950s. Rowena died in 2004. They had two children and four grandchildren; their son, Monte Miron, served as commissioner of the CHL from 1992-1997.

Miron died of a heart attack in Tulsa, Oklahoma on August 28, 2015.

Preceded by Sid Abel	General manager of the Colorado Rockies; 1976–81	Succeeded by Bill MacMillan
