= List of New Jersey Devils general managers =

The New Jersey Devils are a professional ice hockey team based in Newark, New Jersey. They are members of the Metropolitan Division of the National Hockey League's (NHL) Eastern Conference. The Devils franchise has been a part of the NHL since 1974, when the team entered the league as the Kansas City Scouts. Two years later, they moved to Denver, Colorado, and became the Colorado Rockies. The team stayed there until 1982, when they moved to New Jersey. The team has had six general managers since the franchise moved to New Jersey.

== Key ==
Key of terms and definitions
Term	Definition
No.	Number of general managers^{[a]}
Ref(s)	References
–	Does not apply
†	Elected to the Hockey Hall of Fame in the Builder category

== General managers ==
General managers of the New Jersey Devils
No.	Name	Tenure	Accomplishments during this term	Ref(s)
–	Sid Abel	June 1, 1973 – April 15, 1976	No playoff appearances	
–	Ray Miron	August 23, 1976 – May 1, 1981	1 playoff appearance	
1	Bill MacMillan	May 4, 1981 – November 22, 1983	No playoff appearances	
2	Max McNab	November 22, 1983 – September 10, 1987	No playoff appearances	
3	Lou Lamoriello†	September 10, 1987 – May 4, 2015	Won Stanley Cup three times in five Stanley Cup Final appearances (1995, 2000, 2001, 2003, 2012); 5 conference titles, 9 division titles, and 21 playoff appearances	
4	Ray Shero	May 4, 2015 – January 12, 2020	1 playoff appearance	
5	Tom Fitzgerald	January 12, 2020 – April 6, 2026	2 playoff appearances	
6	Sunny Mehta	April 16, 2026 – present		

== See also ==
- List of NHL general managers

== Notes ==
- ^{a} A running total of the number of general managers of the franchise. Thus any general manager who has two or more separate terms as general manager is only counted once. General managers while the franchise was located in Kansas City and Colorado are not counted towards the total.
