= Ed Miller (poker player) =

American poker player and author (born 1979)

- Born: Edward Raymond Miller; August 10, 1979 (age 47); Lubbock, Texas, U.S.
- Occupations: American poker player, author

Edward Raymond Miller (born August 10, 1979) is an American professional poker player and an author of books about poker. He wrote Small Stakes Hold 'em: Winning Big With Expert Play with David Sklansky and Mason Malmuth in 2004. In 2005, he completed Getting Started in Hold 'em, a beginner's book.

In 2006, he co-wrote No Limit Hold 'Em: Theory and Practice with David Sklansky. Miller is also co-author of the book Professional No Limit Hold 'em with Matt Flynn and Sunny Mehta published in 2007 and wrote Small Stakes No-Limit Hold’em co-authored with Sunny Mehta and Matt Flynn. Miller came out with How to Read Hands At No-Limit Hold'em in 2011, Playing the Player in 2012, and Poker's 1% in 2014. His newest book, The Course, was released late April 2015.

Miller is part owner and produces educational poker videos for Red Chip Poker and StoxPoker, both subscription fee based poker coaching sites. He also does personal poker coaching.

After becoming a pesco-vegetarian in 2003 and lacto-ovo vegetarian in 2005, Ed Miller and his wife became vegan in 2007. He attributes health concerns as his primary reasons for changing his diet.

== Biography ==
After prepping at New Orleans, Louisiana's prestigious Isidore Newman School where Miller was a standout performer on the school's renowned forensics team and in the same graduating class as noted author Christopher Rice and American Idol finalist Judd Harris. He was a member of the U.S. Physics Team. Ed Miller received degrees in both Physics and Electrical Engineering from the Massachusetts Institute of Technology in 2000.

Initially, Miller worked as a software developer for Microsoft. After many months of poker playing in the Seattle area, Ed moved to Las Vegas in 2002 where he met Dr. Alan Schoonmaker, the author of The Psychology of Poker (ISBN 1-880685-25-6). Schoonmaker introduced Ed to David Sklansky and Mason Malmuth of Two Plus Two Publishing, LLC. Ed married Elaine Vigneault in 2005.

In 2006, Miller was made over by the Fab Five of the Bravo television show, Queer Eye.

The Queer Eye summary:

"You can't be in Vegas without running into a card shark and Ed is that card shark. But you wouldn't know it by looking at him. The wild hair, the overgrown beard, and the overall unkempt look keeps Ed from looking like the high roller that he is. He has a nerdy look but nerdy can be cool. Unfortunately, Ed hasn't gotten the 'cool' part.

Even more unfortunate, Ed's parents lost their home during the wrath of Hurricane Katrina. This is a great time for our boys to 'make better' Ed and throw a poker tournament benefiting the relief efforts in New Orleans."

After living in Manhattan for two years, Miller now lives and works in Las Vegas.

== Books written by Ed Miller ==
- Ed Miller, David Sklansky, and Mason Malmuth (2004). Small Stakes Hold 'em: Winning Big With Expert Play. Two Plus Two Publishing LLC. ISBN 1-880685-32-9.
- Ed Miller (2005). Getting Started in Hold 'em. Two Plus Two Publishing LLC. ISBN 1-880685-34-5.
- David Sklansky and Ed Miller (2006). No Limit Hold 'Em: Theory and Practice. Two Plus Two Publishing LLC. ISBN 1-880685-37-X.
- Matt Flynn, Sunny Mehta, and Ed Miller (2007). Professional No Limit Hold 'Em: Volume I. Two Plus Two Publishing LLC. ISBN 978-1-880685-40-2.
- Ed Miller, Sunny Mehta, and Matt Flynn (2009). Small Stakes No-Limit Hold'em. ISBN 978-0-9825042-0-8.
- Ed Miller (2011). How to Read Hands at No-Limit Hold'em. CreateSpace Independent Publishing Platform. ISBN 978-1468001310.
- Ed Miller (2012). Playing The Player. CreateSpace Independent Publishing Platform. ISBN 978-1477473085.
- Ed Miller (2014). Poker's 1%. CreateSpace Independent Publishing Platform. ISBN 978-1496159182.
- Ed Miller (2015). The Course. CreateSpace Independent Publishing Platform. ISBN 978-1511768320.
- Ed Miller, James Sweeney, Doug Hull, and Christian Soto (2015). STOP! 10 Things Good Poker Players Don't Do. CreateSpace Independent Publishing Platform. ISBN 978-1517716905.
- Ed Miller, Matthew Davidow (2019). The Logic Of Sports Betting. Ed Miller. ISBN 9781096805724.

== Books edited by Ed Miller ==
- Doug Hull (2013). Poker Plays You Can Use. CreateSpace Independent Publishing Platform. ISBN 978-1489522450.

== DVDs released by Ed Miller ==
- Expert Hold'Em series
