= Two Plus Two Publishing =

Gambling publisher

- Status: Active
- Founded: 1998
- Founder: Ari Roberts
- Country of origin: Canada
- Headquarters location: California
- Distribution: Worldwide
- Official website: https://www.twoplustwo.com/

Two Plus Two Publishing is a private company established and owned by statistician and poker player Mason Malmuth. The company publishes books on poker and gambling written by professionals in the field such as David Sklansky, Dan Harrington, Bill Robertie, Collin Moshman, Ed Miller, Ray Zee, Sunny Mehta, Alan Schoonmaker, William Jockusch, and Malmuth himself.

Two Plus Two Publishing has sold over two million books and currently has more than 39 titles to its credit. According to Malmuth, the name was adopted from the cover design of his book Gambling Theory and Other Topics where the equation 2+2=5 was illustrated with card pictures. In addition, many of its titles are now being translated into many non-English languages.

The Two Plus Two website operates a popular Internet forum for discussions on mostly poker and gambling-related topics, where it also publishes the Two Plus Two monthly electronic magazine (which includes gambling articles by Two Plus Two authors and others, such as Nick Christenson and King Yao) and the weekly Two Plus Two Pokercast. Posts on the forums helped uncover the Absolute Poker cheating scandal that was later featured on 60 Minutes in 2008.

== Pokercast ==
The Two Plus Two Pokercast is a weekly podcast that reports on both live poker and online poker. The show is hosted by Mike Johnson and poker pro Adam Schwartz, with regular contributions from a number of other poker strategists and players. Typically recorded on Tuesday nights in Vancouver, British Columbia, Canada, the show is released on Wednesday mornings via the iTunes Store and the Two Plus Two website. The show is sponsored by the PokerStars VIP Club.

=== Prior to Two Plus Two ===
The hosts of the Two Plus Two Pokercast were the founders of “Rounders – The Poker Show” which launched in April 2005 on terrestrial radio station The Team 1040 (Vancouver) airing weekly on Sunday nights and archived on BigPoker.ca. Rounders ran for 134 episodes before Mike Johnson and Adam Schwartz co-created the Two Plus Two Pokercast in January 2008.

=== Strategy segments ===
Interspersed between segments of the show and advertisements are short strategy segments from top poker pros. Originally, the presenters of these segments were Two Plus Two authors and posters, however as of January 2009 LeggoPoker.com became the official strategy sponsor of the show, and now provides weekly strategy segments by their stable of video producers.

==== Sklansky minutes ====
Aside from strategy segments are “Sklansky Minutes” recorded by Two Plus Two author David Sklansky. Subjects include poker and other games, general gambling theory and musings on life. A collection of similar musings and "life strategy" was published in January 2010 under the title "DUCY?" – Two Plus Two shorthand for "Do You See Why?".

=== Evidence in lawsuit ===
Shortly after winning the 2006 World Series of Poker main event, Jamie Gold appeared on Episode #65 of Rounders, during the interview Gold discussed his backing arrangement with Crispin Leyser. In the following months, during litigation between Leyser and Gold over Gold's Prize, audio of Gold's interview on “Rounders – The Poker Show” was admitted as evidence in the case
