= Ray Shero =

American ice hockey player and executive (1962–2025)

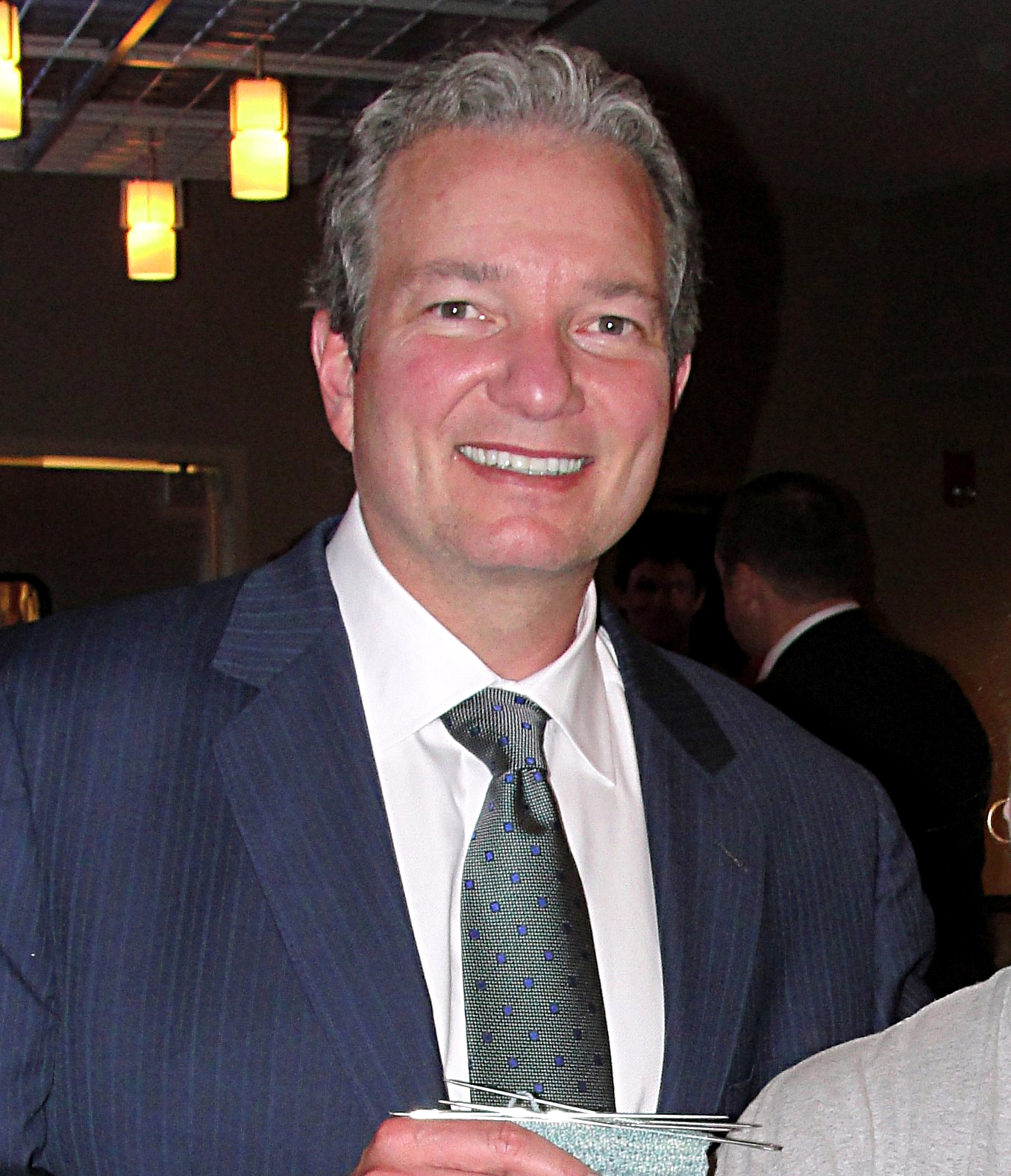
- Shero in 2012
- Born: July 28, 1962 Saint Paul, Minnesota, U.S.
- Died: April 9, 2025 (aged 62) Chandler, Arizona, U.S.
- Height: 6 ft 0 in (183 cm)
- Weight: 190 lb (86 kg; 13 st 8 lb)
- Position: Center
- Played for: St. Lawrence Saints
- NHL draft: 216th overall, 1982; Los Angeles Kings
- Playing career: 1980–1985

Rejean "Ray" Shero (July 28, 1962 – April 9, 2025) was an American ice hockey executive in the National Hockey League (NHL) who served as the general manager of the Pittsburgh Penguins and New Jersey Devils franchises from 2006 to 2020.

Shero played ice hockey at the collegiate level for the St. Lawrence Saints. He was drafted by the Los Angeles Kings in 1982, but never played in the NHL. Shero was an assistant general manager for the Ottawa Senators from 1993 to 1998 and then for the Nashville Predators from 1998 to 2006. He served as the general manager of the Penguins from 2006 to 2014. During his tenure, the Penguins advanced to consecutive Stanley Cup Finals, winning a championship in 2009. He was fired after the Penguins' second round exit from the 2014 playoffs. Shero joined the Devils as general manager in May 2015, replacing Lou Lamoriello, and he held the position until being fired in January 2020. Shero was also an executive for the U.S. men's ice hockey team at the 2010 and 2014 Winter Olympics.

Shero was the son of former Philadelphia Flyers and New York Rangers coach Fred Shero.

== Early life ==
Rejean Shero was born on July 28, 1962, in Saint Paul, Minnesota, to Fred and Mariette Shero. Both of his parents were born and raised Canadians: Fred in Winnipeg and Mariette in Shawinigan, Quebec. His father won the Stanley Cup twice with the Broad Street Bullies edition of the Philadelphia Flyers in the mid-1970s as their coach. Ray often went to Flyers practices with his dad and learned the ropes of NHL hockey management first hand at that time while also getting to know Terry Crisp, Pat Quinn and Jacques Plante — all Flyers assistant coaches — during that period.

Shero played his college ice hockey for the St. Lawrence Saints, captaining the team during the 1984–85 season. He was drafted by the Los Angeles Kings in the 11th round of the 1982 draft, but never played in the NHL.

== Executive career ==
Shero worked as a hockey agent following graduation before becoming the assistant general manager for the Ottawa Senators from 1993 to 1998 and then for the Nashville Predators from their entrance into the league in 1998 until 2006.

=== Pittsburgh Penguins (2006–2014) ===
Shero became general manager of the Pittsburgh Penguins in 2006. In his first season, he made a small splash in the free agent market, signing forwards Mark Recchi and Jarkko Ruutu, along with defenseman Mark Eaton. In addition to these moves, he traded for forwards Nils Ekman and Dominic Moore, after drafting center Jordan Staal with the second overall pick in the 2006 NHL entry draft. This choice paid immediate dividends, as Staal would score 29 goals and 42 points in his rookie year with fellow rookie Evgeni Malkin.

At the trade deadline of the 2006–07 NHL season, Shero swung two major trades, sending Noah Welch to the Florida Panthers for veteran Gary Roberts, and sending Daniel Carcillo and a draft pick to the Phoenix Coyotes for enforcer Georges Laraque.

Shero made several tweaks to his club during the next off-season, signing defenseman Darryl Sydor, forwards Petr Sýkora and Jeff Taffe, and backup goaltender Dany Sabourin. Shero also took several steps to ensure that his nucleus of talent remained in Pittsburgh by re-signing defenseman Ryan Whitney to a six-year, $24 million contract extension, and re-signing center and captain Sidney Crosby to a five-year, $43.5 million extension.

On July 16, 2007, Shero announced that he had re-signed head coach Michel Therrien to a one-year extension through the 2008–09 NHL season.

The trade deadline of the 2007–08 NHL season brought two other major trades for Shero and the Pittsburgh Penguins, sending Colby Armstrong, Erik Christensen, prospect Angelo Esposito, and a future draft pick for the Atlanta Thrashers' Marián Hossa and Pascal Dupuis, as well as bringing the Toronto Maple Leafs' defenseman Hal Gill to his team for two future draft picks.

In 2009, the Penguins defeated the Detroit Red Wings in seven games to win the Stanley Cup on the road at the Joe Louis Arena. The Red Wings defeated the Penguins the year before in the 2008 Stanley Cup Final at Mellon Arena.

Shero won the Jim Gregory General Manager of the Year Award following the 2012–13 season.

On May 16, 2014, the Penguins fired Shero after the team fell to the Rangers in seven games during the second round of the 2014 Stanley Cup playoffs. The Penguins had held a 3–1 series lead heading into game five of the series. This was also the fifth straight year the Penguins were eliminated by a lower-seeded opponent.

=== New Jersey Devils (2015–2020) ===
Shero became the general manager of the New Jersey Devils on May 4, 2015. Notable acquisitions and free agent signings during Shero's tenure as general manager include Taylor Hall, Will Butcher, Jesper Bratt, Kyle Palmieri, Sami Vatanen, P. K. Subban, Wayne Simmonds, Jack Hughes, and Nico Hischier. Despite struggling for the first few years, the Devils returned to the Stanley Cup playoffs in 2018 but were eliminated in the first round 4–1 by the Tampa Bay Lightning.

Shero was fired by the Devils on January 12, 2020. Assistant general manager Tom Fitzgerald was named as his replacement.

=== Minnesota Wild (2021–2025) ===
In June 2021, Shero became an advisor to the Minnesota Wild management, a position he held until his death.

== Personal life and death ==
Shero had two children with his wife Karen: Chris, a scout for the Columbus Blue Jackets; and Kyle, a scout for the Philadelphia Flyers.

Shero died following a brief illness in Arizona, on April 9, 2025, at the age of 62. According to Pittsburgh Hockey Now, he had been undergoing treatment for an aggressive type of cancer.

Other offices
| Preceded by Craig Patrick | General manager of the Pittsburgh Penguins; 2006–2014 | Succeeded by Jason Botterill (interim) |
| Preceded by Lou Lamoriello | General manager of the New Jersey Devils; 2015–2020 | Succeeded by Tom Fitzgerald (interim) |
