= Vicki Movsessian-Lamoriello =

American ice hockey player (born 1972)

- Born: November 6, 1972 (age 53) Concord, Massachusetts, U.S.
- Height: 5 ft 5 in (165 cm)
- Weight: 141 lb (64 kg; 10 st 1 lb)
- Position: Defence
- HE team: Providence
- National team: United States
- Playing career: 1990–1998
Medal record
Women's ice hockey
Representing the United States
Olympic Games
| Gold medal – first place | 1998 Nagano | Team competition |
IIHF World Women's Championships
| Silver medal – second place | 1994 United States | Team competition |
| Silver medal – second place | 1997 Canada | Team competition |

Victoria Movsessian-Lamoriello (born November 6, 1972) is an American ice hockey player. She won a gold medal at the 1998 Winter Olympics. She was the founder of the Massachusetts Spitfires and Rhode Island Sting girls hockey clubs. Movsessian was born in Concord, Massachusetts, but grew up in Lexington, Massachusetts.

== Playing career ==
Movsessian played for the Providence Friars women's ice hockey program and was twice an All-ECAC selection.

== Personal ==
After graduating magna cum laude from Providence (her degree was in marketing and business administration), she worked for Prudential.

She is married to Chris Lamoriello, the son of New York Islanders president of hockey operations and general manager Lou Lamoriello.

== Awards and honors ==
- All-ECAC in 1991-92
- All-ECAC in 1992-93
- Inducted into the Rhode Island Hockey Hall of Fame in 2024
