= Chris Lamoriello =

American ice hockey player, scout, and executive

Christopher Lamoriello
- Born: 1972 (age 53–54) North Providence, Rhode Island, US
- Position: Right wing
- Played for: Providence College (NCAA)
- NHL draft: Undrafted
- Playing career: 1992–1994

Christopher Lamoriello (born 1972) is an American former college ice hockey player. Since 1996, he has been involved with National Hockey League teams as a scout and executive.

== Career ==
Lamoriello played college hockey at Providence College where he graduated in 1994 with a Bachelor of Arts degree in history. In 1996, he joined the New Jersey Devils of the National Hockey League (NHL) as a scout, working with his father Lou Lamoriello. In September 2001, Lamoriello took over the dual role of senior vice president of hockey operations for the Devils and general manager for their American Hockey League (AHL) affiliate, the Albany Devils. He and his father left the Devils' organization in 2015. In 2016, he was hired by the New York Islanders as director of player personnel. In 2017, he was also named the general manager of their AHL affiliate, the Bridgeport Islanders.

== Personal life ==
He is the son of former New York Islanders President of Hockey Operations, General Manager, and Hockey Hall of Famer Lou Lamoriello, and is married to Olympic gold medalist Vicki Movsessian.
