= Q-ratio (poker) =

The Q-ratio (also known as Q number or just Q) is used in poker tournament strategy. It is also known as the "weak force." The Q-ratio describes the relation of the player's stack to the tournament players' average stack. A low Q-ratio — less than 1 — indicates a below-average chip stack, implying disadvantage against opponents. It is an addition to the M-ratio ("strong force") and usually doesn't play a large role in tournament decision-making. However, its importance grows as the table average M-ratio drops.

Q-ratio on freezeouts is calculated using the following method.

$$Q = \frac {currentChips} {startingChips} \times \frac {currentNumPlayers} {startingNumPlayers}$$

For example, in a tournament starting with 50 players who have 10,000 chips, of which 30 have been eliminated, and one player has 20,000 chips:

$$Q = \frac {20,000} {10,000} \times \frac {20} {50} = 0.8$$

This player's accumulation of chips has not kept pace with the elimination of players, and their chip stack is now below average.

On rebuy and add-on tournaments, the calculation method is somewhat more complex and possible to calculate in a reasonable amount of time only on specific online tournaments:

$$Q = \frac {currentChips} {startingChips} \times \frac {currentNumPlayers} {startingNumPlayers + numTotalRebuys + numTotalAddOns}$$

== See also ==
- M-ratio
- Tournament poker
