= Bill Levins =

American ice hockey executive (1922–1991)

- Born: 1922
- Died: August 26, 1991 (aged 69); Oklahoma City, Oklahoma, United States
- Citizenship: American
- Occupation: General Manager
- Employer: Oklahoma City Blazers
- Organization: Central Hockey League
- Known for: Co-founder of the CHL
- Spouse: Gloria Levins
- Children: Daughter Lezley, son Nicholas

William “Bill” Levins (1922 – August 26, 1991) was an American ice hockey executive and sports entrepreneur. Levins was the first general manager of the Oklahoma City Blazers of the old Central Hockey League. He is also recognized as the co-founder, along with Ray Miron, of the current Central Hockey League which began play with the 1992–93 season.

Levins lived in Minnesota until 1965 when he moved to Oklahoma City to become the general manager of the Oklahoma City Blazers. The William “Bill” Levins Memorial Cup was the name of the trophy awarded to the champion of the Central Hockey League from 1992 until 2000 when the honour was renamed the "Ray Miron Cup". Levins died at the age of 69 in Oklahoma City, Oklahoma.

== Awards and honours ==
Award	Year
CHL Professional Hockey Manager of the Year	1965–66
