= Mason Malmuth =

American poker player and author

- Born: 1951 (age 73–74)
- Education: Virginia Tech
- Occupation(s): Poker player, author

Mason Malmuth (born 1951) is an American poker player, and author of books on both poker and gambling. He is the owner of Two Plus Two Publishing, which publishes books and runs an online gambling discussion forum.

Malmuth was born in 1951 and grew up in Coral Gables, Florida. In 1973, he received his bachelor's degree in math, and in 1975 he received his master's degree in math both from Virginia Tech.

The books are authored by himself, David Sklansky, and other writers including Dan Harrington, Bill Robertie, Ray Zee, Matt Janda, Philip Newall, Ed Miller, Nick Grudzien, Collin Moshman and Alan Schoonmaker.

== Books ==
- 1987: Winning Concepts in Draw and Lowball
- 1990: Poker Essays
- 1996: Blackjack Essays
- 1996: Poker Essays Volume II
- 1997: Gambling for a Living (with David Sklansky)
- 1999: Hold 'em Poker for Advanced Players; 21st Century Edition (with David Sklansky)
- 1999: Seven-Card Stud for Advanced Players; 21st Century Edition (with David Sklansky & Ray Zee)
- 2000: Fundamentals of Poker (with Lynne Loomis)
- 2001: Poker Essays Volume III
- 2004: Fundamentals of Craps (with Lynne Loomis)
- 2004: Fundamentals of 21 (with Lynne Loomis)
- 2004: Fundamentals of Video Poker (with Lynne Loomis)
- 2004: Gambling Theory and Other Topics
- 2004: Small Stakes Hold 'em; Winning Big with Expert Play (with Ed Miller & David Sklansky)
- 2009: The Professional Poker Dealer's Handbook: Expanded Edition (with Dan Paymar & Donna Harris)
- 2015: Real Poker Psychology
- 2017: Poker and More (with David Sklansky)
- 2019: The History of the World From a Gambler's Perspective (with Antonio Carrasco)
- 2021: Cardrooms: Everything Bad and How to Make Them Better: An Analysis of Those Areas Where Poker Rooms Need Improvement

Malmuth has also written over 600 articles for various magazines and publications.
