= Bill Robertie =

American backgammon player

William Gerard (Bill) Robertie (born July 9, 1946, in Cambridge, Massachusetts, United States) is a backgammon, chess, and poker player, author and teacher. He is one of several (6 as of 2022) backgammon players to have won the World Backgammon Championship twice (in 1983 and in 1987). Besides the World Championship wins in Monte Carlo, Robertie's major tournament victories include Boston (1979, 1991), Las Vegas (1980, 2001), the New York Metro Open (2011, 2013), the Bahamas Pro-Am (1993), Istanbul (1994) and the Isle of Man Super-Jackpot (1984). In chess, Robertie won the 1970 U.S. Speed Chess Championship.

A Harvard graduate, Robertie co-authored a popular series of seven books on tournament no-limit Texas hold'em with 1995 World Champion Dan Harrington, entitled Harrington on Hold 'em. The books were published by Two Plus Two Publishing.

== Books by Bill Robertie ==
Backgammon:

- Lee Genud versus Joe Dwek, The Gammon Press (1982)
- Advanced Backgammon, The Gammon Press (1984)
- Reno 1986, The Gammon Press (1987)
- Advanced Backgammon, Volume 1 : Positional Play; Gammon Press (1991), ISBN 1-880604-11-6
- Advanced Backgammon, Volume 2 : Technical Play; Gammon Press (1991), ISBN 1-880604-12-4
- Learning from the Machine, The Gammon Press (1993)
- Backgammon for Winners; Cardoza Publishing (1993), ISBN 1-58042-043-5
- Backgammon for Serious Players; Cardoza Publishing (1997), ISBN 0-940685-68-X
- 501 Essential Backgammon Problems; Cardoza Publishing (2000), ISBN 1-58042-019-2
- Modern Backgammon; The Gammon Press (2001), ISBN 1-880604-17-5
- How To Play The Opening in Backgammon - Part 1: A New Way of Thinking; Gammon Press (2020), ISBN 978-1-880604-23-6
- How to Play The Opening in Backgammon - Part 2: Everything Matters; Gammon Press (2021), ISBN 978-1-880604-24-3
- How to Play The Opening in Backgammon - Part 3: Order From Chaos; Gammon Press (2023), ISBN 978-1-880604-01-4

Chess:

- Basic endgame strategy, Cardoza Publishing (1998), ISBN 0-940685-89-2
- Beginning chess play, Cardoza Publishing (2002), ISBN 1-58042-044-3
- Winning chess openings, Cardoza Publishing (2002), ISBN 1-58042-051-6
- Winning chess tactics, Cardoza Publishing (2002), ISBN 1-58042-075-3
- Easy Endgame Strategies, Cardoza Publishing (2003), ISBN 1-58042-110-5
- Master Checkmate Strategy, Cardoza Publishing (2003), ISBN 1-58042-096-6

Poker:

- Harrington on Hold'em: Volume I: Strategic Play, Two Plus Two Publishing (2004) ISBN 1-880685-33-7
- Harrington on Hold'em: Volume II: The Endgame, Two Plus Two Publishing (2005) ISBN 1-880685-35-3
- Harrington on Hold'em: Volume III: The Workbook, Two Plus Two Publishing (2006) ISBN 1-880685-36-1
- Harrington on Cash Games: Volume I, Two Plus Two Publishing (2008) ISBN 1-880685-42-6
- Harrington on Cash Games: Volume II, Two Plus Two Publishing (2008) ISBN 1-880685-43-4
- Harrington on Online Cash Games, Two Plus Two Publishing (2010)
- Harrington on Modern Tournament Poker, Two Plus Two Publishing (2014)
