= Tom Fitzgerald (ice hockey) =

American player and executive (born 1968)

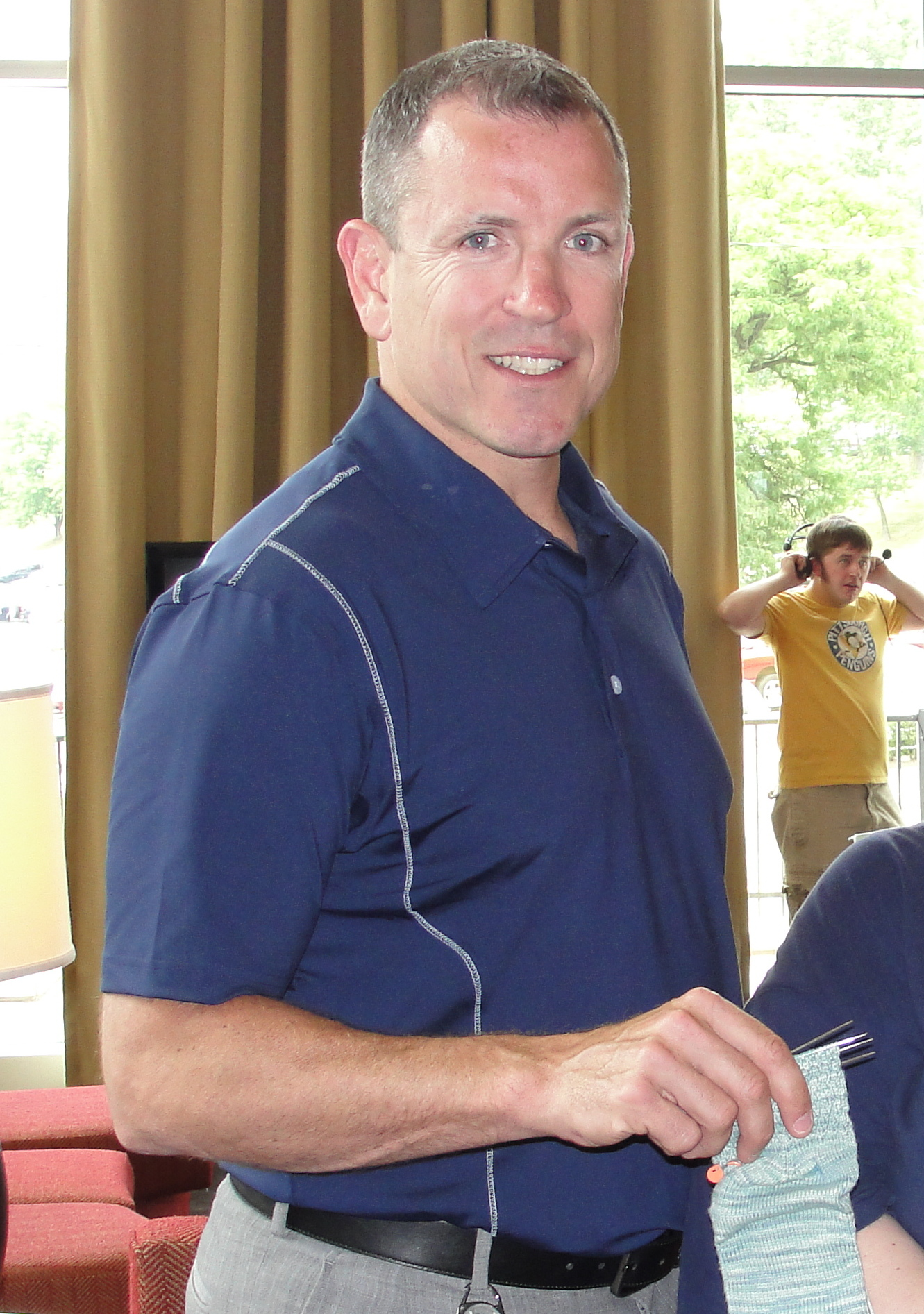
- Fitzgerald in 2012
- Born: August 28, 1968 (age 58) Billerica, Massachusetts, U.S.
- Height: 6 ft 0 in (183 cm)
- Weight: 191 lb (87 kg; 13 st 9 lb)
- Position: Right wing
- Shot: Right
- Played for: New York Islanders; Florida Panthers; Colorado Avalanche; Nashville Predators; Chicago Blackhawks; Toronto Maple Leafs; Boston Bruins
- National team: United States
- NHL draft: 17th overall, 1986; New York Islanders
- Playing career: 1988–2006

Thomas James Fitzgerald (born August 28, 1968) is an American ice hockey executive and former player who played 17 seasons in the National Hockey League (NHL) and American Hockey League (AHL). He most recently served as president of hockey operations and general manager of the New Jersey Devils. He won the Stanley Cup in 2009 as a director of player development with the Pittsburgh Penguins.

== Playing career ==
Fitzgerald played his high school hockey at Austin Preparatory School in Reading, Massachusetts, he then went on to play college hockey for Providence College and was selected by the New York Islanders of the NHL in the 1986 NHL entry draft (1st round, 17th overall). He turned pro in 1988 with the Islanders' American Hockey League affiliate Springfield Indians, and in 1990 was one of the key players who led Indians to the Calder Cup championship.

He played parts of five seasons for the Islanders and became the first player in NHL playoff history to score two shorthanded goals on the same minor penalty, against the Pittsburgh Penguins on May 2, 1993, which also equaled the NHL record for shorthanded goals by a player in one game. He was selected as one of the original Florida Panthers in the 1993 NHL expansion draft. Although he has been cast as a defensive forward in the NHL, he had his best scoring years in Miami and was one of the leaders in Florida's 1996 Stanley Cup run. In those 1995–96 playoffs, Fitzgerald scored the decisive goal in game seven of the Eastern Conference Final against the Pittsburgh Penguins. It was a 58-foot slapshot that found its way past Penguins goaltender Tom Barrasso.

He was briefly traded to the Colorado Avalanche in 1998 before signing as a free agent in the subsequent off-season with the Nashville Predators, who sought out his veteran leadership. Fitzgerald was named Nashville's first captain, serving in the capacity for four seasons. He subsequently played for the Chicago Blackhawks and the Toronto Maple Leafs. He had signed with the Maple Leafs to a two-year contract on July 18, 2002. While with Toronto, Fitzgerald and his Maple Leafs teammate Gary Roberts both played in the 1,000th game of their careers on January 13, 2004.

In the summer of 2004, Fitzgerald signed as a free agent with the Boston Bruins. In July 2006, the Boston Bruins chose not to renew his contract. He announced his retirement after 17 NHL seasons on September 12, 2006.

== Executive career ==
In July 2007, Fitzgerald left NESN when he was named director of player development for the Pittsburgh Penguins. In October 2007, he was then named as an assistant coach for the United States national team for the Deutschland Cup, helping push them to second place. On July 3, 2009, Fitzgerald was promoted within the Penguins organization to assistant general manager.

On July 24, 2015, Fitzgerald was named assistant general manager for the New Jersey Devils. On January 12, 2020, Fitzgerald was named interim general manager of the Devils after Ray Shero was fired. On July 9, Fitzgerald was named executive vice president and full-time general manager of the Devils. On January 23, 2024, he signed a multi-year contract with the Devils and was promoted to president of hockey operations, while also keeping his general manager duties. On April 6, 2026, Fitzgerald was fired by the Devils, with Fitzgerald stating that “it was apparent to everyone the best course of action is to move on."

== Personal life ==
Tom and his wife have four sons; Ryan, Casey, Jack and Brendan. Fitzgerald did a stint as an analyst for the Outdoor Life Network during the 2006 Stanley Cup playoffs, and was one of NESN's studio analysts during postgame coverage of Boston Bruins' matches. His son Ryan was drafted in the fourth round (120th overall) in the 2013 NHL entry draft by the Boston Bruins, and currently plays for the Utica Comets, the New Jersey Devils's AHL affiliate. Casey, who was drafted in the third round (86th overall) of the 2016 NHL entry draft by the Buffalo Sabres, currently plays for the Florida Panthers. Both Ryan and Casey attended Boston College, skating on the same roster from 2015–2017.

Fitzgerald grew up with his cousin, fellow NHL player Keith Tkachuk. He is also cousins with Tkachuk's sons Matthew and Brady of the Florida Panthers, as well as Kevin Hayes of the St. Louis Blues and Jimmy Hayes, who played for the Wilkes-Barre/Scranton Penguins before retiring in 2019.

== Career statistics ==
=== Regular season and playoffs ===
			Regular season					Playoffs
Season	Team	League	GP	G	A	Pts	PIM	GP	G	A	Pts	PIM
1984–85	Austin Preparatory School	HSMA	18	20	21	41	—	—	—	—	—	—
1985–86	Austin Preparatory School	HSMA	24	35	38	73	—	—	—	—	—	—
1986–87	Providence Friars	HE	27	8	14	22	22	—	—	—	—	—
1987–88	Providence Friars	HE	36	19	15	34	50	—	—	—	—	—
1988–89	Springfield Indians	AHL	61	24	18	42	43	—	—	—	—	—
1988–89	New York Islanders	NHL	23	3	5	8	10	—	—	—	—	—
1989–90	Springfield Indians	AHL	53	30	23	53	32	14	2	9	11	13
1989–90	New York Islanders	NHL	19	2	5	7	4	4	1	0	1	4
1990–91	Capital District Islanders	AHL	27	7	7	14	50	—	—	—	—	—
1990–91	New York Islanders	NHL	41	5	5	10	24	—	—	—	—	—
1991–92	Capital District Islanders	AHL	4	1	1	2	4	—	—	—	—	—
1991–92	New York Islanders	NHL	45	6	11	17	28	—	—	—	—	—
1992–93	New York Islanders	NHL	77	9	18	27	34	18	2	5	7	18
1993–94	Florida Panthers	NHL	83	18	14	32	54	—	—	—	—	—
1994–95	Florida Panthers	NHL	48	3	13	16	31	—	—	—	—	—
1995–96	Florida Panthers	NHL	82	13	21	34	75	22	4	4	8	34
1996–97	Florida Panthers	NHL	71	10	14	24	64	5	0	1	1	0
1997–98	Florida Panthers	NHL	69	10	5	15	57	—	—	—	—	—
1997–98	Colorado Avalanche	NHL	11	2	1	3	22	7	0	1	1	20
1998–99	Nashville Predators	NHL	80	13	19	32	48	—	—	—	—	—
1999–00	Nashville Predators	NHL	82	13	9	22	66	—	—	—	—	—
2000–01	Nashville Predators	NHL	82	9	9	18	71	—	—	—	—	—
2001–02	Nashville Predators	NHL	63	7	9	16	33	—	—	—	—	—
2001–02	Chicago Blackhawks	NHL	15	1	3	4	6	5	0	0	0	4
2002–03	Toronto Maple Leafs	NHL	66	4	13	17	57	7	0	1	1	4
2003–04	Toronto Maple Leafs	NHL	69	7	10	17	52	10	0	0	0	6
2005–06	Boston Bruins	NHL	71	4	6	10	40	—	—	—	—	—
NHL totals			1,097	139	190	329	776	78	7	12	19	90

=== International ===
Year	Team	Event	Result	GP	G	A	Pts	PIM
1987	United States	WJC	4th	7	3	0	3	2
1989	United States	WC	6th	10	0	2	2	12
1991	United States	WC	4th	10	1	0	1	6
Junior totals				7	3	0	3	2
Senior totals				20	1	2	3	18

== See also ==
- List of NHL players with 1,000 games played

Awards and achievements
Preceded by Derek King	New York Islanders first-round draft pick 1986	Succeeded by Dean Chynoweth
Sporting positions
Preceded by Position created	Nashville Predators captain 1998–2002	Succeeded by Greg Johnson
Preceded by Ray Shero	General manager of the New Jersey Devils; 2020–2026	Succeeded by TBA
